= Rod Wave discography =

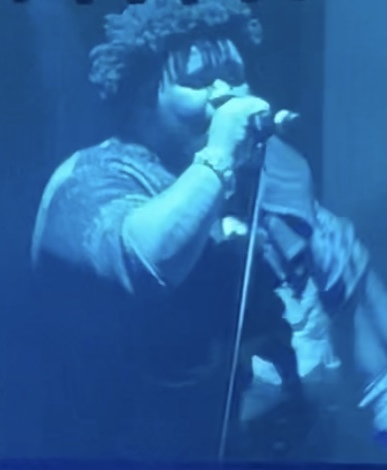
- Green performing in Pittsburgh during his Beautiful Mind Tour, 2022
- Studio albums: 7
- EPs: 1
- Singles: 47
- Mixtapes: 5

The discography of American rapper and singer Rod Wave consists of seven studio albums, five mixtapes, one extended play, and forty-seven singles (including four as a featured artist). His music has been released on record labels Alamo Records, Geffen Records, and Interscope Records, along with subsidiaries Hit House Entertainment. With over 60 million digital units sold in the United States, he is among the highest certified artists in the United States. Rod Wave has achieved three number-one albums on the Billboard 200 and seven top-twenty entries on the Billboard Hot 100. he is the only artist (other than Taylor Swift) to debut a chart-topping solo album each year from 2021 to 2023 and is the only rapper to have achieved a platinum album each year from 2019 to 2025.

After signing with Alamo Records in 2018, Green released three mixtapes, Hunger Games 2 (2018), Hunger Games 3 (2018), and PTSD (2019), before the release of his debut studio album, Ghetto Gospel (2019), his first appearance on the Billboard 200 at #10. The album was later certified platinum by the Recording Industry Association of America (RIAA). Ghetto Gospel was preceded by three singles, "Heart on Ice", "Cuban Links" featuring Kevin Gates, and "Close Enough to Hurt". The former two peaked at numbers 25 and 92 on the US Billboard Hot 100, respectively, and became certified 5× platinum and platinum by the Recording Industry Association of America (RIAA). In April 2020, Green released his sophomore studio album, Pray 4 Love. The album debuted at #2 on the Billboard 200, and later certified double platinum by the RIAA and gold by Music Canada. The album produced the 3× platinum single, "Girl of My Dreams", alongside Green's viral track, "Rags2Riches" featuring ATR Son Son or a remix featuring Lil Baby. The track was certified 5× platinum by the RIAA and peaked at number 12 on the Billboard Hot 100. In May 2020, Green signed a global co-publishing deal with Sony Music Publishing (formerly Sony/ATV publishing).

In March 2021, Green released his third studio album, SoulFly. It debuted atop the Billboard 200, moving 130,000 units in its first week, marking Green's first album to top the chart. It also debuted within the top 20 in Canada. The album produced three of Green's most notable singles, "Street Runner", "Tombstone", and "Richer" featuring Polo G. These singles peaked at number 16, 11, and 22 on the Billboard Hot 100, respectively, and became certified 4× platinum and 6× platinum by the RIAA. The album itself was certified double platinum by the RIAA. With the release of the album, Green was the biggest artist-songwriter in the first quarter of the year. In August of the same year, a deluxe edition of the album was released, launching the album back to the top ten of the Billboard 200. Green's fourth studio album, Beautiful Mind was released in August 2022, and likewise debuted atop the Billboard 200, moving 115,000 units in its first week, marking Green's second consecutive chart-topping project. The album produced the 3× platinum single, "By Your Side" and was later certified platinum itself. Following the release of the album, Green released the EP Jupiter's Diary: 7 Day Theory which debuted at number 10 on the Billboard 200, marking his sixth top ten on the chart.

Green's fifth studio album, Nostalgia was released in September 2023 and debuted atop the Billboard 200 chart, moving 137,000 units in its first week, marking Green's highest first-week sales. The album marked Green's third consecutive number 1 on the chart and spent two weeks atop the Billboard 200. The album produced the top 20 singles, "Fight the Feeling", "Call Your Friends", and "Come See Me", the prior two received double platinum certification by the RIAA, alongside the album itself. In May 2024, Nostalgia was listed amongst Sony Music's highest grossing albums of the fiscal year. Green's sixth studio album, Last Lap was released in October 2024 and debuted at number two on the Billboard 200 chart, moving 127,000 units in its first week, marking Green's seventh consecutive top ten album, becoming his sixth platinum album, and making him the only artist other than Taylor Swift to chart a top ten album each year from 2019 to 2024. The album spawned the Billboard Hot 100 top-twenty charting song, "25".

== Studio albums ==
List of studio albums, with selected chart positions, sales figures, and certifications
| Title | Album details | Peak chart positions | | | | | | | | | Sales (Note: Sales figures for albums, EPs, and singles are pure sales that do not take equivalent units into account.) | Certifications |
| Title | Album details | US | US R&B/HH | US Rap | AUS | CAN | IRE | NLD | NZ | UK | Sales | Certifications |
|---|---|---|---|---|---|---|---|---|---|---|---|---|
| Ghetto Gospel | Released: November 1, 2019; Label: Alamo, Interscope; Formats: LP, digital download, streaming | 10 | 7 | 5 | — | — | — | — | — | — | | RIAA: Platinum |
| Pray 4 Love | Released: April 3, 2020; Label: Alamo, Geffen, Interscope; Formats: LP, digital download, streaming | 2 | 2 | 1 | — | 54 | — | — | — | — | US: 22,400 (Note: In 2020 the album sold 22,400 pure copies) | RIAA: 2× Platinum; MC: Gold |
| SoulFly | Released: March 26, 2021; Label: Alamo, Geffen, Interscope; Formats: Digital download, streaming | 1 | 1 | 1 | — | 16 | 68 | 84 | — | 57 | US: 12,000 (Note: In 2021 the album sold 12,000 pure copies) | RIAA: 2× Platinum |
| Beautiful Mind | Released: August 12, 2022; Label: Alamo; Formats: Digital download, streaming | 1 | 1 | 1 | — | 34 | — | — | — | — | US: 3,000 (Note: In 2022 the album sold 3,000 pure copies) | RIAA: Platinum |
| Nostalgia | Released: September 15, 2023; Label: Alamo; Formats: LP, digital download, streaming | 1 | 1 | 1 | — | 29 | — | — | 18 | 46 | US: 3,372 (Note: In 2023 the album sold 3,372 pure copies) | RIAA: 2× Platinum |
| Last Lap | Released: October 11, 2024; Label: Alamo; Formats: LP, digital download, streaming | 2 | 1 | 1 | — | 34 | — | 91 | 33 | 63 | | RIAA: Platinum |
| Don't Look Down | Released: August 28, 2026; Label: Alamo; Formats: CD, LP, digital download, streaming | 1 | 1 | 1 | 70 | — | — | — | 32 | — | | |
"—" denotes a title that did not chart, or was not released in that territory.

== Extended plays ==
List of EPs, with selected details and chart positions
| Title | Details | Peak chart positions | | |
| Title | Details | US | US R&B/HH | US Rap |
|---|---|---|---|---|
| Jupiter's Diary: 7 Day Theory | Released: November 18, 2022; Label: Alamo; Format: Digital download, streaming | 9 | 5 | 3 |

== Mixtapes ==
List of mixtapes, with selected details
| Title | Details |
|---|---|
| Rookie of the Year | Released: July 25, 2017; Label: Hit House Entertainment; Format: Digital download, streaming |
| Hunger Games | Released: December 12, 2017; Label: Hit House Entertainment; Format: Digital download, streaming |
| Hunger Games 2 | Released: May 25, 2018; Label: Alamo; Format: Digital download, streaming |
| Hunger Games 3 | Released: December 10, 2018; Label: Alamo; Format: Digital download, streaming |
| PTSD | Released: June 14, 2019; Label: Alamo; Format: Digital download, streaming |

== Singles ==
=== As lead artist ===
List of singles as lead artist, with selected chart positions, showing year released and album name
| Title | Year | Peak chart positions | | | | | | | Certifications | Album |
| Title | Year | US | US R&B/HH | US Rap | CAN | IRE | NZ Hot | WW | Certifications | Album |
|---|---|---|---|---|---|---|---|---|---|---|
| "Praying Grandmothers" | 2018 | — | — | — | — | — | — | — | | Hunger Games 2 |
| "Heart 4 Sale" | 2018 | — | — | — | — | — | — | — | | Hunger Games 3 |
| "Yessir" | 2018 | — | — | — | — | — | — | — | | Hunger Games 3 |
| "Feel the Same Way" (featuring Moneybagg Yo) | 2018 | — | — | — | — | — | — | — | RIAA: Gold | Hunger Games 3 |
| "Popular Loner" | 2019 | — | — | — | — | — | — | — | RIAA: Platinum | PTSD |
| "Hard Times" | 2019 | — | — | — | — | — | — | — | | PTSD |
| "Calabasas" (featuring E-40) | 2019 | — | — | — | — | — | — | — | | PTSD |
| "Paint the Sky Red" | 2019 | — | — | — | — | — | — | — | RIAA: Platinum | PTSD |
| "Fly" | 2019 | — | — | — | — | — | — | — | | Non-album single |
| "Heart on Ice" (solo or remix featuring Lil Durk) | 2019 | 25 | 13 | 9 | 77 | — | — | — | RIAA: 5× Platinum; BPI: Silver; RMNZ: Platinum | PTSD and Ghetto Gospel |
| "Cuban Links" (featuring Kevin Gates) | 2019 | 92 | 39 | — | — | — | — | — | RIAA: Platinum | Ghetto Gospel |
| "Close Enough to Hurt" | 2019 | — | — | — | — | — | — | — | RIAA: Platinum | Ghetto Gospel |
| "Dark Clouds" | 2019 | — (Note: "Dark Clouds" did not enter the Billboard Hot 100, but peaked at number one on the Bubbling Under Hot 100 chart.) | — | — | — | — | — | — | RIAA: 2× Platinum | Pray 4 Love |
| "Misunderstood" | 2019 | — | — | — | — | — | — | — | | Non-album single |
| "Thug Motivation" | 2020 | — (Note: "Thug Motivation" did not enter the Billboard Hot 100, but peaked at number 15 on the Bubbling Under Hot 100 chart.) | — | — | — | — | — | — | RIAA: Gold | Pray 4 Love |
| "Thief in the Night" | 2020 | 74 | 35 | — | — | — | — | — | RIAA: Platinum | Pray 4 Love |
| "Pray 4 Love" | 2020 | 67 | 30 | 23 | — | — | — | — | RIAA: Gold | Pray 4 Love |
| "The Greatest" | 2020 | 78 | 39 | — | — | — | — | — | RIAA: Platinum | Pray 4 Love |
| "And I Still" | 2020 | — | — | — | — | — | — | — | | Non-album singles |
| "The Last Sad Song" | 2020 | — | — | — | — | — | — | — | | Non-album singles |
| "Girl of My Dreams" | 2020 | 65 | 24 | 23 | — | — | — | — | RIAA: 3× Platinum | Pray 4 Love |
| "Through the Wire" | 2020 | — (Note: "Through the Wire" did not enter the Billboard Hot 100, but peaked at number three on the Bubbling Under Hot 100 chart.) | — | — | — | — | — | — | RIAA: Platinum | Pray 4 Love |
| "Freestyle" | 2020 | 86 | 32 | — | — | — | — | — | RIAA: Platinum | Pray 4 Love |
| "Shooting Star" | 2020 | — | — | — | — | — | — | — | RIAA: Gold | Non-album singles |
| "All Week" | 2020 | — | — | — | — | — | — | — | | Non-album singles |
| "Street Runner" | 2021 | 16 | 9 | 7 | — | — | 27 | 34 | RIAA: 4× Platinum; RMNZ: Gold | SoulFly |
| "Tombstone" | 2021 | 11 | 5 | 4 | — | — | 31 | 26 | RIAA: 3× Platinum | SoulFly |
| "Richer" (featuring Polo G) | 2021 | 22 | 13 | 11 | 74 | 88 | 11 | 43 | RIAA: 6× Platinum | SoulFly |
| "Everything Different" (with Culture Jam featuring YoungBoy Never Broke Again) | 2021 | — | — | — | — | — | — | — | | Kawhi Leonard Presents: Culture Jam (Vol. 1) |
| "Forever Set in Stone" | 2021 | — | — | — | — | — | — | — | | Non-album single |
| "Time Heals" | 2021 | 99 | 38 | — | — | — | — | — | RIAA: Gold | SoulFly (Deluxe) |
| "By Your Side" | 2021 | 58 | 10 | 7 | — | — | — | 119 | RIAA: 3× Platinum | Beautiful Mind |
| "Cold December" | 2022 | 38 | 9 | 5 | — | — | — | 83 | RIAA: 2× Platinum | Beautiful Mind |
| "Stone Rolling" | 2022 | 66 | 21 | 21 | — | — | — | — | RIAA: Gold | Beautiful Mind |
| "Alone" | 2022 | 21 | 7 | 4 | — | — | 26 | 53 | RIAA: 2× Platinum | Beautiful Mind |
| "Break My Heart" | 2022 | 76 | 23 | 17 | — | — | 33 | — | RIAA: Gold | Jupiter's Diary: 7 Day Theory |
| "Fight the Feeling" | 2023 | 16 | 7 | 3 | — | — | 22 | 57 | RIAA: 2× Platinum | Nostalgia |
| "Call Your Friends" | 2023 | 18 | 7 | 5 | — | — | 14 | 84 | RIAA: 2× Platinum | Nostalgia |
| "Come See Me" | 2023 | 19 | 8 | 6 | — | — | 34 | 87 | RIAA: Platinum | Nostalgia |
| "Boyz Don't Cry" | 2023 | 25 | 10 | 8 | — | — | 30 | 93 | RIAA: Gold | Nostalgia |
| "Checkmate" | 2023 | 55 | 22 | 19 | — | — | — | — | RIAA: Platinum | Nostalgia |
| "Numb" | 2024 | — | — | — | — | — | — | — | RIAA: Gold | Non-album single |
| "Passport Junkie" | 2024 | 51 | 14 | 12 | — | — | 33 | — | RIAA: Platinum | Last Lap |
| "Fall Fast in Love" | 2024 | 49 | 13 | 10 | — | — | 36 | — | RIAA: Platinum | Last Lap |
| "Westside Connection" | 2025 | — (Note: "Westside Connection" did not enter the Billboard Hot 100, but peaked at number six on the Bubbling Under Hot 100 chart.) | 31 | — | — | — | 36 | — | | Non-album single |
| "Sinners" | 2025 | — (Note: "Sinners" did not enter the Billboard Hot 100, but peaked at number one on the Bubbling Under Hot 100 chart.) | 23 | — | — | — | 30 | — | | Sinners |
| "Leavin" | 2025 | 63 | 12 | 7 | — | — | — | — | | Non-album single |
| "Feed the Streets" | 2026 | 86 | 33 | — | — | — | — | — | | Don't Look Down |
| "Piece of Your Love" | 2026 | 40 | 10 | 6 | — | — | — | — | | Don't Look Down |
| "Hustle" | 2026 | 48 | 13 | 9 | — | — | 22 | — | | Don't Look Down |
"—" denotes a title that did not chart, or was not released in that territory.

=== As featured artist ===
List of singles as a featured artist, with selected chart positions, showing year released and album name
| Title | Year | Peak chart positions | | | Certifications | Album |
| Title | Year | US Bub. | US R&B/HH | US Rap | Certifications | Album |
|---|---|---|---|---|---|---|
| "Seen it All" (OTM Frenchyy featuring Rod Wave) | 2018 | — | — | — | | Non-album singles |
| "No Chillin (Get to That Gwap)" (DBM Bonez featuring Rod Wave and YNW Melly) | 2019 | — | — | — | | Non-album singles |
| "Before I Go" (Kodak Black featuring Rod Wave) | 2021 | 10 | 46 | — | RIAA: Gold | Non-album singles |
| "Broken Heart" (Rocksolid Teezy featuring Rod Wave) | 2022 | — | — | — | | Non-album singles |
| "Voicemail" (Tee Grizzley featuring Rod Wave) | 2025 | 21 | 36 | 24 | | Street Psalms |
"—" denotes a title that did not chart, or was not released in that territory.

== Other charted and certified songs ==
List of songs, with selected chart positions and certifications, showing year released and album name
| Title | Year | Peak chart positions | | | | | | | | | Certifications | Album |
| Title | Year | US | US R&B/HH | US Rap | CAN | IRE | NZ | SA | UK | WW | Certifications | Album |
|---|---|---|---|---|---|---|---|---|---|---|---|---|
| "Sky Priority" | 2019 | — | — | — | — | — | — | — | — | — | RIAA: 2× Platinum | Ghetto Gospel |
| "Dark Conversations" | 2019 | — | — | — | — | — | — | — | — | — | RIAA: Platinum | Ghetto Gospel |
| "Green Light" | 2019 | — | — | — | — | — | — | — | — | — | RIAA: 2× Platinum | Ghetto Gospel |
| "Brace Face" | 2019 | — | — | — | — | — | — | — | — | — | RIAA: Platinum | Ghetto Gospel |
| "Poison" | 2019 | — | — | — | — | — | — | — | — | — | RIAA: 2× Platinum | Ghetto Gospel |
| "Abandoned" | 2019 | — | — | — | — | — | — | — | — | — | RIAA: Platinum | Ghetto Gospel |
| "Chip on My Shoulder" | 2019 | — | — | — | — | — | — | — | — | — | RIAA: Platinum | Ghetto Gospel |
| "Fuck the World" | 2020 | 64 | 29 | 22 | — | — | — | — | — | — | RIAA: Platinum | Pray 4 Love |
| "Thug Life" | 2020 | 95 | 49 | — | — | — | — | — | — | — | RIAA: Gold | Pray 4 Love |
| "I Remember" | 2020 | 77 | 38 | — | — | — | — | — | — | — | RIAA: Gold | Pray 4 Love |
| "No Weakness" | 2020 | 99 | — | — | — | — | — | — | — | — | RIAA: Gold | Pray 4 Love |
| "Roaming" | 2020 | — (Note: "Roaming" did not enter the Billboard Hot 100, but peaked at number 16 on the Bubbling Under Hot 100 chart.) | — | — | — | — | — | — | — | — | RIAA: Gold | Pray 4 Love |
| "Ribbon in the Sky" | 2020 | 84 | 43 | — | — | — | — | — | — | — | RIAA: Platinum | Pray 4 Love |
| "5% Tints" | 2020 | — | — | — | — | — | — | — | — | — | RIAA: Gold | Pray 4 Love |
| "Rags2Riches" (featuring ATR Son Son) | 2020 | 12 | 7 | 5 | 50 | 41 | — | — | 87 | 63 | RIAA: 5× Platinum; RMNZ: Gold | Pray 4 Love |
| "Letter from Houston" | 2020 | 62 | 24 | 22 | — | — | — | — | — | — | RIAA: 3× Platinum | Pray 4 Love |
| "SoulFly" | 2021 | 55 | 26 | 19 | — | — | — | — | — | 103 | RIAA: 2× Platinum | SoulFly |
| "Gone Till November" | 2021 | 61 | 28 | 21 | — | — | — | — | — | 116 | RIAA: Gold | SoulFly |
| "Blame on You" | 2021 | 65 | 30 | 23 | — | — | — | — | — | 132 | | SoulFly |
| "Don't Forget" | 2021 | 63 | 29 | 22 | — | — | — | — | — | 129 | RIAA: Gold | SoulFly |
| "All I Got" | 2021 | 71 | 34 | — | — | — | — | — | — | 179 | | SoulFly |
| "Pills & Billz" | 2021 | 85 | 41 | — | — | — | — | — | — | — | | SoulFly |
| "How the Game Go" | 2021 | 88 | 43 | — | — | — | — | — | — | — | | SoulFly |
| "Shock da World" | 2021 | 96 | 47 | — | — | — | — | — | — | — | | SoulFly |
| "What's Love??" | 2021 | 94 | 46 | — | — | — | — | — | — | — | RIAA: Gold | SoulFly |
| "OMDB" | 2021 | 89 | 44 | — | — | — | — | — | — | — | RIAA: Gold | SoulFly |
| "Invisible Scar" | 2021 | — (Note: "Invisible Scar" did not enter the Billboard Hot 100, but peaked at number one on the Bubbling Under Hot 100 chart.) | — | — | — | — | — | — | — | — | | SoulFly |
| "Calling" | 2021 | — (Note: "Calling" did not enter the Billboard Hot 100, but peaked at number four on the Bubbling Under Hot 100 chart.) | — | — | — | — | — | — | — | — | | SoulFly |
| "Sneaky Links" | 2021 | 98 | 49 | — | — | — | — | — | — | — | RIAA: Gold | SoulFly |
| "Believe Me" | 2021 | — (Note: "Believe Me" did not enter the Billboard Hot 100, but peaked at number 11 on the Bubbling Under Hot 100 chart.) | — | — | — | — | — | — | — | — | | SoulFly |
| "Moving On" | 2021 | — (Note: "Moving On" did not enter the Billboard Hot 100, but peaked at number eight on the Bubbling Under Hot 100 chart.) | — | — | — | — | — | — | — | — | | SoulFly |
| "Changing" | 2021 | — (Note: "Changing" did not enter the Billboard Hot 100, but peaked at number seven on the Bubbling Under Hot 100 chart.) | — | — | — | — | — | — | — | — | RIAA: Gold | SoulFly |
| "Rich Off Pain" (with Lil Baby and Lil Durk) | 2021 | 68 | 29 | — | — | — | — | — | — | 118 | RIAA: Gold | The Voice of the Heroes |
| "Heart of a Giant" (Polo G featuring Rod Wave) | 2021 | 83 | 35 | — | — | — | — | — | — | 143 | RIAA: Gold | Hall of Fame |
| "2019" | 2021 | — (Note: "2019" did not enter the Billboard Hot 100, but peaked at number two on the Bubbling Under Hot 100 chart.) | 43 | — | — | — | — | — | — | — | RIAA: Gold | SoulFly (Deluxe) |
| "Escape" | 2021 | — (Note: "Escape" did not enter the Billboard Hot 100, but peaked at number 17 on the Bubbling Under Hot 100 chart.) | — | — | — | — | — | — | — | — | | SoulFly (Deluxe) |
| "What's Wrong" | 2021 | 93 | 35 | — | — | — | — | — | — | — | RIAA: Platinum | SoulFly (Deluxe) |
| "Take the Blame" | 2021 | — (Note: "Take the Blame" did not enter the Billboard Hot 100, but peaked at number 23 on the Bubbling Under Hot 100 chart.) | — | — | — | — | — | — | — | — | RIAA: Gold | SoulFly (Deluxe) |
| "Get Ready" (featuring Kodak Black) | 2021 | 91 | 33 | 24 | — | — | — | — | — | — | RIAA: 2× Platinum | SoulFly (Deluxe) |
| "Already Won" (featuring Lil Durk) | 2021 | 60 | 19 | 13 | — | — | — | — | — | 109 | RIAA: Gold | SoulFly (Deluxe) |
| "Losing My Cool" | 2021 | — (Note: "Losing My Cool" did not enter the Billboard Hot 100, but peaked at number 25 on the Bubbling Under Hot 100 chart.) | — | — | — | — | — | — | — | | RIAA: Gold | SoulFly (Deluxe) |
| "Home Ain't Home" (YoungBoy Never Broke Again featuring Rod Wave) | 2022 | 47 | 14 | 12 | — | — | — | — | — | 181 | | The Last Slimeto |
| "Yungen" (featuring Jack Harlow) | 2022 | 35 | 12 | 10 | — | — | — (Note: "Yungen" did not enter the NZ Top 40 Singles Chart, but peaked at number 17 on the NZ Hot Singles Chart.) | — | — | 78 | RIAA: Platinum | Beautiful Mind |
| "Never Get Over Me" | 2022 | 48 | 14 | 13 | — | — | — | — | — | 153 | RIAA: Gold | Beautiful Mind |
| "I Know It" | 2022 | 74 | 26 | 24 | — | — | — | — | — | — | | Beautiful Mind |
| "Forever" | 2022 | 58 | 18 | 18 | — | — | — | — | — | — | RIAA: Gold | Beautiful Mind |
| "No Deal" | 2022 | 71 | 24 | 22 | — | — | — | — | — | — | | Beautiful Mind |
| "Quiet Storm" (featuring December Joy) | 2022 | — (Note: "Quiet Storm" did not enter the Billboard Hot 100, but peaked at number nine on the Bubbling Under Hot 100 chart.) | 47 | — | — | — | — | — | — | — | | Beautiful Mind |
| "Sweet Little Lies" | 2022 | 51 | 15 | 15 | — | — | — | — | — | 177 | RIAA: Platinum | Beautiful Mind |
| "Rockstar Heart" | 2022 | 90 | 33 | — | — | — | — | — | — | — | | Beautiful Mind |
| "Fading" | 2022 | 96 | 37 | — | — | — | — | — | — | — | | Beautiful Mind |
| "Time Kills (Love Birds)" | 2022 | 95 | 36 | — | — | — | — | — | — | — | | Beautiful Mind |
| "Keep Going" | 2022 | — (Note: "Keep Going" did not enter the Billboard Hot 100, but peaked at number one on the Bubbling Under Hot 100 chart.) | 40 | — | — | — | — | — | — | — | | Beautiful Mind |
| "Never Find Us" | 2022 | — (Note: "Never Find Us" did not enter the Billboard Hot 100, but peaked at number 12 on the Bubbling Under Hot 100 chart.) | 50 | — | — | — | — | — | — | — | | Beautiful Mind |
| "Mafia" | 2022 | — (Note: "Mafia" did not enter the Billboard Hot 100, but peaked at number five on the Bubbling Under Hot 100 chart.) | 44 | — | — | — | — | — | — | — | | Beautiful Mind |
| "Me vs. the World" | 2022 | — (Note: "Me vs. the World" did not enter the Billboard Hot 100, but peaked at number two on the Bubbling Under Hot 100 chart.) | 42 | — | — | — | — | — | — | — | | Beautiful Mind |
| "Pieces" | 2022 | 86 | 30 | — | — | — | — | — | — | — | RIAA: Gold | Beautiful Mind |
| "Everything" | 2022 | — (Note: "Everything" did not enter the Billboard Hot 100, but peaked at number 22 on the Bubbling Under Hot 100 chart.) | — | — | — | — | — | — | — | — | | Beautiful Mind |
| "Married Next Year" | 2022 | — (Note: "Married Next Year" did not enter the Billboard Hot 100, but peaked at number 10 on the Bubbling Under Hot 100 chart.) | 48 | — | — | — | — | — | — | — | RIAA: Gold | Beautiful Mind |
| "Better" | 2022 | — (Note: "Better" did not enter the Billboard Hot 100, but peaked at number 18 on the Bubbling Under Hot 100 chart.) | — | — | — | — | — | — | — | — | | Beautiful Mind |
| "Got It Right" | 2022 | 95 | 31 | 24 | — | — | — | — | — | — | | Jupiter's Diary: 7 Day Theory |
| "The Answer Is No" | 2022 | — (Note: "The Answer Is No" did not enter the Billboard Hot 100, but peaked at number seven on the Bubbling Under Hot 100 chart.) | 43 | — | — | — | — | — | — | — | | Jupiter's Diary: 7 Day Theory |
| "Jupiter's Diary" | 2022 | — (Note: "Jupiter's Diary" did not enter the Billboard Hot 100, but peaked at number three on the Bubbling Under Hot 100 chart.) | 39 | — | — | — | — | — | — | — | RIAA: Gold | Jupiter's Diary: 7 Day Theory |
| "Love Overdose" | 2022 | — (Note: "Love Overdose" did not enter the Billboard Hot 100, but peaked at number five on the Bubbling Under Hot 100 chart.) | 41 | — | — | — | — | — | — | — | RIAA: Gold | Jupiter's Diary: 7 Day Theory |
| "MJ Story" | 2022 | — (Note: "MJ Story" did not enter the Billboard Hot 100, but peaked at number two on the Bubbling Under Hot 100 chart.) | 36 | — | — | — | — | — | — | — | | Jupiter's Diary: 7 Day Theory |
| "Just Sing" | 2022 | — (Note: "Just Sing" did not enter the Billboard Hot 100, but peaked at number 18 on the Bubbling Under Hot 100 chart.) | — | — | — | — | — | — | — | — | | Jupiter's Diary: 7 Day Theory |
| "Don't Need" | 2022 | — (Note: "Don't Need" did not enter the Billboard Hot 100, but peaked at number 24 on the Bubbling Under Hot 100 chart.) | — | — | — | — | — | — | — | — | | Jupiter's Diary: 7 Day Theory |
| "Nostalgia" (with Wet) | 2023 | 40 | 15 | 13 | — | — | — | — | — | 157 | | Nostalgia |
| "Long Journey" | 2023 | 39 | 14 | 12 | — | — | — (Note: "Long Journey" did not enter the NZ Top 40 Singles Chart, but peaked at number 26 on the NZ Hot Singles Chart.) | — | — | 147 | RIAA: Platinum | Nostalgia |
| "HG4" | 2023 | 51 | 21 | 18 | — | — | — | — | — | — | RIAA: Gold | Nostalgia |
| "Crazy" | 2023 | 48 | 20 | 17 | — | — | — | — | — | 183 | RIAA: Gold | Nostalgia |
| "Love for a Thug" | 2023 | 56 | 23 | 20 | — | — | — | — | — | — | | Nostalgia |
| "Turks & Caicos" (featuring 21 Savage) | 2023 | 24 | 9 | 7 | — | — | — (Note: "Turks & Caicos" did not enter the NZ Top 40 Singles Chart, but peaked at number 29 on the NZ Hot Singles Chart.) | — | — | 92 | RIAA: 2× Platinum | Nostalgia |
| "Pass You By" | 2023 | 73 | 28 | 23 | — | — | — | — | — | | | Nostalgia |
| "Great Gatsby" | 2023 | 30 | 9 | 6 | — | — | — (Note: "Great Gatsby" did not enter the NZ Top 40 Singles Chart, but peaked at number 23 on the NZ Hot Singles Chart.) | — | — | 128 | RIAA: 2× Platinum | Nostalgia |
| "Keep It G" | 2023 | 71 | 26 | 22 | — | — | — | — | — | — | RIAA: Gold | Nostalgia |
| "Love Story/Interlude" | 2023 | 79 | 31 | — | — | — | — | — | — | — | RIAA: Gold | Nostalgia |
| "Rap Beef" | 2023 | 93 | 37 | — | — | — | — | — | — | — | | Nostalgia |
| "Back Lit" | 2023 | 80 | 32 | — | — | — | — | — | — | — | RIAA: Gold | Nostalgia |
| "2018" (with Sadie Jean) | 2023 | 61 | 25 | 21 | — | — | — | — | — | — | RIAA: Gold | Nostalgia |
| "Better Than Ever" (with YoungBoy Never Broke Again) | 2023 | 99 | 25 | — | — | — | — | — | — | — | | Decided 2 |
| "Turtle Race" | 2024 | 57 | 18 | 15 | — | — | — | — | — | — | | Last Lap |
| "Last Lap" | 2024 | 35 | 8 | 6 | — | — | — (Note: "Last Lap" did not enter the NZ Top 40 Singles Chart, but peaked at number 20 on the NZ Hot Singles Chart.) | — | — | 166 | RIAA: Gold | Last Lap |
| "Apply Pressure" | 2024 | 63 | 20 | 17 | — | — | — | — | — | — | | Last Lap |
| "25" | 2024 | 16 | 4 | 2 | — | — | — (Note: "25" did not enter the NZ Top 40 Singles Chart, but peaked at number 5 on the NZ Hot Singles Chart.) | 33 | — | 48 | RIAA: 2× Platinum | Last Lap |
| "Fuck the Fame" (featuring Lil Baby and Lil Yachty) | 2024 | 50 | 14 | 11 | — | — | — (Note: "Fuck the Fame" did not enter the NZ Top 40 Singles Chart, but peaked at number 29 on the NZ Hot Singles Chart.) | — | — | — | | Last Lap |
| "Federal Nightmares" | 2024 | 44 | 10 | 7 | — | — | — | — | — | — | RIAA: Gold | Last Lap |
| "Angel with an Attitude" | 2024 | 46 | 11 | 8 | — | — | — (Note: "Angel with an Attitude" did not enter the NZ Top 40 Singles Chart, but peaked at number 31 on the NZ Hot Singles Chart.) | — | — | — | RIAA: Gold | Last Lap |
| "The Best" | 2024 | 75 | 25 | 22 | — | — | — | — | — | — | | Last Lap |
| "Never Mind" | 2024 | 54 | 17 | 14 | — | — | — | — | — | — | | Last Lap |
| "Mike" | 2024 | 94 | 36 | — | — | — | — | — | — | — | | Last Lap |
| "Even Love" | 2024 | 82 | 28 | — | — | — | — | — | — | — | | Last Lap |
| "Waited 2 Late" (with Wild Rivers) | 2024 | 93 | 35 | — | — | — | — | — | — | — | | Last Lap |
| "D.A.R.E." | 2024 | 95 | 37 | — | — | — | — | — | — | — | | Last Lap |
| "The Mess They Made" | 2024 | — (Note: "The Mess They Made" did not enter the Billboard Hot 100, but peaked at number two on the Bubbling Under Hot 100 chart.) | 43 | — | — | — | — | — | — | — | | Last Lap |
| "Karma" | 2024 | 100 | 41 | — | — | — | — | — | — | — | | Last Lap |
| "Spaceship" | 2024 | — (Note: "Spaceship" did not enter the Billboard Hot 100, but peaked at number eight on the Bubbling Under Hot 100 chart.) | 47 | — | — | — | — | — | — | — | | Last Lap |
| "Lost in Love" (with Be Charlotte) | 2024 | 87 | 30 | — | — | — | — | — | — | — | RIAA: Gold | Last Lap |
| "Bachelor" | 2024 | — (Note: "Bachelor" did not enter the Billboard Hot 100, but peaked at number 11 on the Bubbling Under Hot 100 chart.) | — | — | — | — | — | — | — | — | | Last Lap |
| "Scared Love" | 2024 | 96 | 38 | — | — | — | — | — | — | — | | Last Lap |
| "IRan" | 2024 | — (Note: "IRan" did not enter the Billboard Hot 100, but peaked at number five on the Bubbling Under Hot 100 chart.) | 44 | — | — | — | — | — | — | — | RIAA: Gold | Last Lap |
| "Jersey Numbers" (featuring Rylo Rodriguez) | 2024 | — (Note: "Jersey Numbers" did not enter the Billboard Hot 100, but peaked at number 15 on the Bubbling Under Hot 100 chart.) | — | — | — | — | — | — | — | — | | Last Lap |
| "By Myself" (Lil Baby and Rylo Rodriguez featuring Rod Wave) | 2025 | 44 | 10 | 8 | — | — | 15 | — | — | 169 | | WHAM |
| "Summer Joy Intro" (featuring Summer Joy) | 2026 | — (Note: "Summer Joy Intro" did not enter the Billboard Hot 100, but peaked at number 14 on the Bubbling Under Hot 100 chart.) | 45 | — | — | — | — | — | — | — | | Don't Look Down |
| "I Am" | 2026 | 55 | 16 | 12 | — | — | — (Note: "I Am" did not enter the NZ Top 40 Singles Chart, but peaked at number 31 on the NZ Hot 40 Singles Chart.) | — | — | — | | Don't Look Down |
| "Look at Me Momma" | 2026 | 74 | 22 | 16 | — | — | — | — | — | — | | Don't Look Down |
| "Mainstay" (featuring Luv Von) | 2026 | 94 | 31 | 24 | — | — | — (Note: "Mainstay" did not enter the NZ Top 40 Singles Chart, but peaked at number 15 on the NZ Hot 40 Singles Chart.) | — | — | — | | Don't Look Down |
| "War Wounds" | 2026 | 54 | 15 | 11 | — | — | — | — | — | — | | Don't Look Down |
| "Venusian" (featuring Hazlett) | 2026 | 88 | 27 | 20 | — | — | — | — | — | — | | Don't Look Down |
| "TP" | 2026 | 89 | 28 | 21 | — | — | — | — | — | — | | Don't Look Down |
| "Keep Dancing" (featuring Hazlett) | 2026 | 72 | 21 | 15 | — | — | — | — | — | — | | Don't Look Down |
| "LaCosa Nostra" | 2026 | 92 | 30 | 23 | — | — | — | — | — | — | | Don't Look Down |
| "One More Time" | 2026 | — (Note: "One More Time" did not enter the Billboard Hot 100, but peaked at number 5 on the Bubbling Under Hot 100 chart.) | 34 | — | — | — | — | — | — | — | | Don't Look Down |
| "Not New to It" | 2026 | 75 | 23 | 17 | — | — | — | — | — | — | | Don't Look Down |
| "The Inspo" | 2026 | — (Note: "The Inspo" did not enter the Billboard Hot 100, but peaked at number 6 on the Bubbling Under Hot 100 chart.) | 37 | — | — | — | — | — | — | — | | Don't Look Down |
| "Overrated" | 2026 | — (Note: "Overrated" did not enter the Billboard Hot 100, but peaked at number 3 on the Bubbling Under Hot 100 chart.) | 33 | — | — | — | — | — | — | — | | Don't Look Down |
| "2017 (Streamer U)" (featuring Aimee Carty) | 2026 | 90 | 29 | 22 | — | — | — (Note: "2017 (Streamer U)" did not enter the NZ Top 40 Singles Chart, but peaked at number 34 on the NZ Hot 40 Singles Chart.) | — | — | — | | Don't Look Down |
| "Lost and Insecure" | 2026 | 95 | 32 | 25 | — | — | — | — | — | — | | Don't Look Down |
| "Florida Boy" | 2026 | — (Note: "Florida Boy" did not enter the Billboard Hot 100, but peaked at number 10 on the Bubbling Under Hot 100 chart.) | 42 | — | — | — | — | — | — | — | | Don't Look Down |
| "Kiss Me Interlude" | 2026 | 82 | 24 | 18 | — | — | — | — | — | — | | Don't Look Down |
| "Dope Girl" | 2026 | 70 | 17 | 10 | — | — | — | — | — | — | | Don't Look Down |
| "Take Care" | 2026 | 52 | 14 | 10 | — | — | — | — | — | — | | Don't Look Down |
| "All I Ever Had" | 2026 | — (Note: "All I Ever Had" did not enter the Billboard Hot 100, but peaked at number 13 on the Bubbling Under Hot 100 chart.) | 44 | — | — | — | — | — | — | — | | Don't Look Down |
"—" denotes a recording that did not chart or was not released in that territory.

== Guest appearances ==
List of non-single guest appearances, with other performing artists, showing year released and album name
| Title | Year | Other performer(s) | Album |
|---|---|---|---|
| "Know That" | 2017 | YNW Melly | Collect Calls |
| "Bag Alert" | 2019 | Plies, 9lokkNine | The Goat |
| "Bigger Picture" | 2019 | Tcrook$ | Pay Homage |
| "Rockstar Lifestyle" | 2019 | Young Bizzy | Back To Bizzness |
| "Made This Way" | 2019 | E-40, Tee Grizzley | Practice Makes Paper |
| "Sorry Momma" | 2020 | Rich the Kid, YoungBoy Never Broke Again | Nobody Safe |
| "Rich Off Pain" | 2021 | Lil Baby, Lil Durk | The Voice of the Heroes |
| "Heart of a Giant" | 2021 | Polo G | Hall of Fame |
| "Lonely at the Top" | 2021 | Berner | Gotti |
| "Home Ain't Home" | 2022 | YoungBoy Never Broke Again | The Last Slimeto |
| "Paper Chase" | 2022 | OMN Twee | Saved By the Bale: Back To School Edition |
| "Better Than Ever" | 2023 | YoungBoy Never Broke Again | Decided 2 |
| "By Myself" | 2025 | Lil Baby, Rylo Rodriguez | WHAM |
