= Nostalgia Tour =

2023 concert tour by Rod Wave

- Tour by Rod Wave
- Location: United States
- Associated albums: Nostalgia
- Start date: October 19, 2023
- End date: December 18, 2023
- Legs: 1
- No. of shows: 35

Rod Wave concert chronology
- Beautiful Mind Tour (2022); Nostalgia Tour (2023); Last Lap Tour (2024–2025)

The Nostalgia Tour is the fourth concert tour by American rapper and singer Rod Wave to promote his fifth studio album Nostalgia. The tour commenced on October 19, 2023, in Lincoln, Nebraska, and concluded on December 18, 2023, in Jacksonville, Florida, consisting of 35 shows.

== Background ==
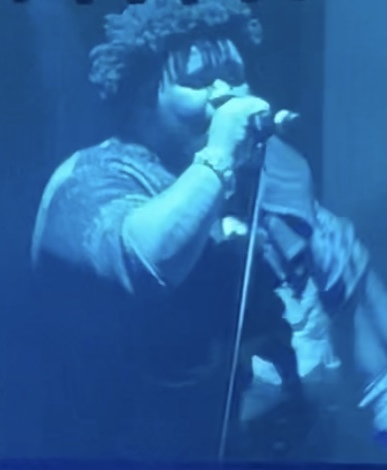
Green performing in Pittsburgh during his Beautiful Mind Tour, 2022.

Green announced the tour dates on September 11, 2023, and revealed that the tour will be supported by Ari Lennox, G Herbo, Toosii, and Eelmatic. The tour was confirmed to be in support of Green's fifth full-length studio album, Nostalgia, released on September 15, 2023.

== Set list ==
This set list is representative of the show in Boston, on November 8, 2023. It does not represent all of the concerts for the duration of the tour.

1. "Call Your Friends"
2. "Sky Priority"
3. "Poison"
4. "Green Light"
5. "Abandoned"
6. "Heart on Ice"
7. "Cuban Links”
8. "Dark Clouds"
9. "Fuck the World"
10. "Freestyle"
11. "Girl of My Dreams"
12. "Letter from Houston"
13. "Rags2Riches"
14. "2019"
15. "Gone Till November"
16. "Paint the Sky Red"
17. "Tombstone
18. "Street Runner"
19. "Alone"
20. "By Your Side"
21. "Sweet Little Lies"
22. "Cold December"
23. "Come See Me"
24. "Nostalgia"
25. "Turks & Caicos"
26. "HG4”
27. "Crazy”
28. "Long Journey"
29. "Fight The Feeling"
30. "2018”
31. "Boyz Don't Cry"
32. "Great Gatsby"

== Shows ==
List of concerts, showing date, city, country, venue, opening acts, tickets sold, number of available tickets and gross revenue
Date	City	Country	Venue	Opening acts	Attendance (tickets sold / available)	Revenue
October 19, 2023	Lincoln	United States	Pinnacle Bank Arena	—	9,595 / 10,333 (89.4%)	$867,784
October 20, 2023	Saint Paul	United States	Xcel Energy Center	—	12,283 / 12,283 (100%)	$1,320,566
October 21, 2023	Milwaukee	United States	Fiserv Forum	Ari Lennox; Toosii	12,876 / 12,876 (100%)	$1,691,330
October 23, 2023	Kansas City	United States	T-Mobile Center	—	10,378 / 13,296 (78,05%)	$855,967
October 24, 2023	Indianapolis	United States	Gainbridge Fieldhouse	Ari Lennox; Toosii	11,463 / 11,463 (100%)	$1,349,122
October 26, 2023	Louisville	United States	KFC Yum! Center	Ari Lennox	13,060 / 13,060 (100%)	$1,315,920
October 27, 2023	Detroit	United States	Little Caesars Arena	Ari Lennox; Toosii	13,983 / 13,983 (100%)	$1,723,381
October 29, 2023	Pittsburgh	United States	PPG Paints Arena	—	12,932 / 12,932 (100%)	$1,484,797
October 30, 2023	Columbus	United States	Nationwide Arena	—	13,809 / 13,809 (100%)	$1,704,160
November 2, 2023	Toronto	Canada	Scotiabank Arena	Ari Lennox; Toosii	8,904 / 12,316 (72.3%)	$449,528
November 4, 2023	Baltimore	United States	CFG Bank Arena	Ari Lennox; Toosii	11,886 / 11,886 (100%)	$1,661,216
November 7, 2023	Albany	United States	MVP Arena	Ari Lennox; Toosii	8,840 / 10,300 (85.83%)	$648,646
November 8, 2023	Boston	United States	TD Garden	Ari Lennox; Toosii	11,078 / 11,078 (100%)	$1,222,319
November 9, 2023	Philadelphia	United States	Wells Fargo Center	Ari Lennox; Toosii	15,526 / 15,526 (100%)	$1,989,886
November 11, 2023	Brooklyn	United States	Barclays Center	Ari Lennox	14,967 / 14,967 (100%)	$2,007,772
November 12, 2023	Washington, D.C.	United States	Capital One Arena	Ari Lennox; Toosii	15,362 / 16,140 (95.19%)	$2,165,174
November 14, 2023	Raleigh	United States	Lenovo Center	Ari Lennox; Toosii	14,580 / 14,580 (100%)	$1,905,668
November 15, 2023	Charlotte	United States	Spectrum Center	Ari Lennox; Toosii	14,345 / 14,345 (100%)	$1,760,088
November 16, 2023	Nashville	United States	Bridgestone Arena	Ari Lennox; Toosii	—	—
November 18, 2023	Birmingham	United States	Legacy Arena	—	—	—
November 19, 2023	St. Louis	United States	Enterprise Center	—	—	—
November 22, 2023	Chicago	United States	United Center	—	—	—
November 24, 2023	Oklahoma City	United States	Paycom Center	Ari Lennox; Toosii	—	—
November 29, 2023	Los Angeles	United States	Kia Forum	Ari Lennox; Toosii	—	—
November 30, 2023	Oakland	United States	Oakland Arena	Ari Lennox; Toosii	—	—
December 4, 2023	San Diego	United States	Pechanga Arena	—	—	—
December 5, 2023	Phoenix	United States	Desert Diamond Arena	Ari Lennox; Toosii	—	—
December 7, 2023	Houston	United States	Toyota Center	—	—	—
December 9, 2023	Fort Worth	United States	Dickies Arena	Ari Lennox; Toosii	—	—
December 10, 2023	Austin	United States	Moody Center	Ari Lennox; Toosii	—	—
December 12, 2023	New Orleans	United States	Smoothie King Center	Ari Lennox; Toosii	—	—
December 13, 2023	Atlanta	United States	State Farm Arena	Ari Lennox; Toosii	—	—
December 15, 2023	Orlando	United States	Amway Center	Ari Lennox; Toosii	—	—
December 17, 2023	Fort Lauderdale	United States	Amerant Bank Arena	—	—	—
December 18, 2023	Jacksonville	United States	VyStar Veterans Memorial Arena	Ari Lennox; Toosii	—	—
Total					225,867	$26,123,324 (18 shows)
