= Last Lap Tour =

2024–2025 concert tour by Rod Wave

Last Lap Tour!
- Tour by Rod Wave
- Location: United States
- Associated albums: Last Lap
- Start date: October 19, 2024
- End date: January 20, 2025
- Legs: 1
- No. of shows: 28

Rod Wave concert chronology
- Nostalgia Tour (2023); Last Lap Tour (2024–2025)

The Last Lap Tour is the fifth concert tour by American rapper and singer Rod Wave to promote his sixth studio album Last Lap. The tour commenced on October 18, 2024, in Phoenix, Arizona, and concluded on January 20, 2025, in Lafayette, Louisiana, consisting of 28 shows.

== Background ==
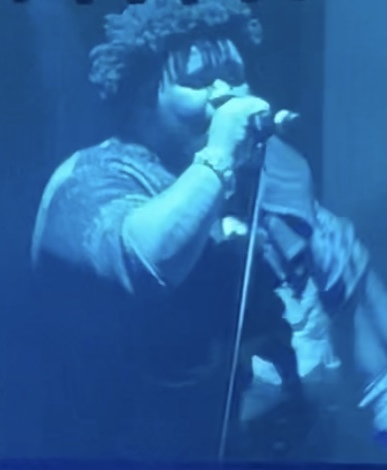
Green performing in Pittsburgh during his Beautiful Mind Tour, 2022.

Green announced the tour dates on September 4, 2024, and revealed that the tour will be supported by Moneybagg Yo, Toosii, Lil Poppa, Dess Dior, and Eelmatic. The tour was confirmed to be in support of Green's sixth full-length studio album, Last Lap, released on October 11, 2024. Originally, the tour consisted of 36 dates and was scheduled to commence on October 19, 2024, and conclude on December 18, 2024, however, due to several production issues at the beginning of the tour, several dates were canceled or rescheduled; a second leg was announced for the troubles on November 5, 2024. The new schedule consisted of 19 dates from October 21 to December 21. On November 12, the second leg was announced, consisting of an additional 18 songs, with many being rescheduled shows that were previously canceled.

Green's Inglewood performance for January 8, 2025, was canceled due to the January 2025 Southern California wildfires. Green shared on social media, "I Hope Everyone Stays Safe" with a prayer-hands emoji.

On January 29, 2025, Green canceled the remaining 13 dates of the tour due to production issues.

== Critical reception ==
The tour received highly positive reviews from critics, who praised Green's performance.

Reviewing the tour's third night in Dallas, Texas, Bryson "Boom" Paul wrote that the "concert showed Wave's unbreakable bond with his rapidly growing fanbase". Paul stated that during Green's performance of "Nostalgia", his "mellow melodic flow was drowned out by the sea of fans singing along for the entire performance". Reviewing the tour's first night in Atlanta, Georgia, A.R. Shaw wrote that the tour "solidifies Rod Wave's presence in music while being a sign of what's to come".

== Set list ==
This set list is representative of the show in Phoenix, Arizona, on October 18, 2024. It does not represent all of the concerts for the duration of the tour.

1. "Nostalgia"
2. "Sky Priority"
3. "Poison"
4. "Green Light"
5. "Heart on Ice"
6. "Cuban Links"
7. "Dark Clouds"
8. "Girl of My Dreams"
9. "Letter from Houston"
10. "Rags2Riches"
11. "2019”
12. "Tombstone"
13. "Street Runner"
14. "By Your Side"
15. "Alone"
16. "Come See Me"
17. "The Best"
18. "Call Your Friends"
19. "Turks & Caicos"
20. "HG4"
21. "2018"
22. "Boyz Don't Cry"
23. "Great Gatsby"
24. "The Mess They Made"
25. "Fall Fast in Love"
26. "Passport Junkie"
27. "Last Lap"

Encore

28. "25"
29. "Federal Nightmares"
30. "Lonely"
31. "Forever"

== Shows ==
Date	City	Country	Venue	Opening act(s)	Attendance	Revenue
October 19, 2024	Phoenix	United States	Desert Diamond Arena	Moneybagg Yo; Toosii; Lil Poppa; Dess Dior	9,802 / 15,854 (61.83%)	$1,142,216
October 31, 2024	Houston	United States	Toyota Center	—N/a	13,132 / 14,015 (93.70%)	$1,868,062
November 2, 2024 (Note: Rescheduled from November 1, 2024.)	Dallas	United States	American Airlines Center	—N/a	15,631 / 16,656 (93.85%)	$2,335,611
November 9, 2024	Memphis	United States	FedExForum	—N/a	—N/a	—N/a
November 13, 2024	Detroit	United States	Little Caesars Arena	—N/a	—N/a	—N/a
November 15, 2024 (Note: Rescheduled from November 8, 2024.)	St. Louis	United States	Enterprise Center	—N/a	—N/a	—N/a
November 18, 2024	Chicago	United States	United Center	—N/a	—N/a	—N/a
November 20, 2024	Columbus	United States	Nationwide Arena	—N/a	—N/a	—N/a
November 23, 2024	Boston	United States	TD Garden	—N/a	—N/a	—N/a
November 25, 2024 (Note: Rescheduled from November 24, 2024.)	Washington, D.C.	United States	Capital One Arena	—N/a	—N/a	—N/a
November 29, 2024	Baltimore	United States	CFG Bank Arena	—N/a	—N/a	—N/a
November 30, 2024 (Note: Rescheduled from December 1, 2024.)	Philadelphia	United States	Wells Fargo Center	—N/a	—N/a	—N/a
December 1, 2024	Philadelphia	United States	Wells Fargo Center	—N/a	—N/a	—N/a
December 5, 2024	Atlanta	United States	State Farm Arena	—N/a	—N/a	—N/a
December 8, 2024	Charlotte	United States	Spectrum Center	—N/a	—N/a	—N/a
December 10, 2024	Birmingham	United States	Legacy Arena	—N/a	—N/a	—N/a
December 13, 2024	New Orleans	United States	Smoothie King Center	—N/a	—N/a	—N/a
December 16, 2024	Jacksonville	United States	VyStar Veterans Memorial Arena	—N/a	—N/a	—N/a
December 17, 2024	Orlando	United States	Kia Center	—N/a	—N/a	—N/a
December 18, 2024	Fort Lauderdale	United States	Amerant Bank Arena	—N/a	—N/a	—N/a
December 20, 2024 (Note: Rescheduled from December 6, 2024.)	Columbia	United States	Colonial Life Arena	—N/a	—N/a	—N/a
December 21, 2024 (Note: Rescheduled from November 26, 2024.)	Raleigh	United States	Lenovo Center	—N/a	—N/a	—N/a
January 5, 2025 (Note: Rescheduled from October 25, 2024.)	Sacramento	United States	Golden 1 Center	—N/a	—N/a	—N/a
January 6, 2025	Oakland	United States	Oakland Arena	—N/a	—N/a	—N/a
January 13, 2025 (Note: Rescheduled from November 3, 2024.)	Denver	United States	Ball Arena	—N/a	—N/a	—N/a
January 15, 2025	Austin	United States	Moody Center	—N/a	—N/a	—N/a
January 18, 2025	Dallas	United States	American Airlines Center	—N/a	—N/a	—N/a
January 20, 2025	Lafayette	United States	Cajundome	—N/a	—N/a	—N/a
Total					38,565	$5,345,889

=== Cancelled shows ===
List of cancelled concerts, showing date, city, country, venue, and reason for cancellation
Date	City	Country	Venue	Reason
October 30, 2024	San Antonio	United States	Frost Bank Center	Security concerns following Sacramento reschedule.
November 5, 2024	Kansas City	United States	T-Mobile Center	Unknown
November 6, 2024	Oklahoma City	United States	Paycom Center	Unknown
November 10, 2024	Lexington	United States	Rupp Arena	Unknown
November 15, 2024	Minneapolis	United States	Xcel Energy Center	Unknown
December 2, 2024	New York City	United States	UBS Arena	Unknown
January 8, 2025 (Note: Rescheduled from October 20, 2024.)	Inglewood (Note: Labeled as Los Angeles in promotional material.)	United States	Intuit Dome	January 2025 Southern California wildfires resulted in the date being cancelled.
January 28, 2025	Nashville	United States	Bridgestone Arena	Production issues.
January 30, 2025	Atlanta	United States	State Farm Arena	Production issues.
February 1, 2025	Detroit	United States	Little Caesars Arena	Production issues.
February 4, 2025 (Note: Rescheduled from November 16, 2024.)	Milwaukee	United States	Fiserv Forum	Production issues.
February 6, 2025 (Note: Rescheduled from November 21, 2024.)	Indianapolis	United States	Gainbridge Fieldhouse	Production issues.
February 10, 2025	Chicago	United States	United Center	Production issues.
February 12, 2025 (Note: Rescheduled from November 12, 2024.)	Pittsburgh	United States	PPG Paints Arena	Production issues.
February 14, 2025	Brooklyn	United States	Barclays Center	Production issues.
February 16, 2025 (Note: Rescheduled from December 3, 2024.)	Newark	United States	Prudential Center	Production issues.
February 18, 2025	Louisville	United States	KFC Yum! Center	Production issues.
February 20, 2025	Cleveland	United States	Rocket Mortgage FieldHouse	Production issues.
February 22, 2025	Charlottesville	United States	John Paul Jones Arena	Production issues.
February 25, 2025	Greensboro	United States	First Horizon Coliseum	Production issues.
