= Checkmate (Rod Wave song) =

2023 single by Rod Wave

Single by Rod Wave

from the album Nostalgia
- Released: September 14, 2023
- Length: 3:17
- Label: Alamo
- Songwriters: Rodarius Green; Bryan Beachley; Cameron Holmes; Jonas Gumdal
- Producers: BeatsByTrain; Camm; Fraxille

Rod Wave singles chronology
"Boyz Don't Cry" (2023)	"Checkmate" (2023)	"Numb" (2024)

Music video
- "Checkmate" on YouTube

"Checkmate" is a song by American rapper and singer Rod Wave, released on September 14, 2023 as the fifth single from his fifth studio album Nostalgia (2023). It was produced by BeatsbyTrain, Camm and Fraxille.

== Composition ==
The song deals with a past romantic relationship in Rod Wave's life which he misses and how his heartbreak is affecting his everyday life, as well as Wave's appreciation for his loved ones for helping him succeed.

== Critical reception ==
Alexander Cole of HotNewHipHop wrote, "The vocals here are powerful, and the same can be said for the lyrics. Lastly, the production here is also solid and fits the theme of Wave's previous work."

== Music video ==
An official music video was released alongside the single. It shows Rod Wave in activities all over the country, such as being in the pool, flying on a private jet, and spending time with his twin daughters.

== Charts ==
Chart performance for "Checkmate"
Chart (2023)	Peak position
US Billboard Hot 100	55
US Hot R&B/Hip-Hop Songs (Billboard)	22

== Certifications ==
Region	Certification	Certified units/sales
United States (RIAA)	Platinum	1,000,000^{‡}
^{‡} Sales+streaming figures based on certification alone.
