= Sweet Little Lies (Rod Wave song) =

2022 song by Rod Wave

Song by Rod Wave

from the album Beautiful Mind
- Released: August 12, 2022
- Length: 2:54
- Label: Alamo Records
- Songwriters: Rodarius Green; Tahj Vaughn; Sterling Reynolds; Lukas Payne
- Producers: Tahj Money; LondnBlue; Karltin Bankz

"Sweet Little Lies" is a song by American rapper and singer Rod Wave from his fourth studio album Beautiful Mind (2022). It was produced by Tahj Money, LondnBlue, and Karltin Bankz.

== Critical reception ==
Mosi Reeves for Rolling Stone wrote that on the song, Green "sings" while "admitting that the promise of living happily ever after is a myth".

== Charts ==
Chart performance for "Sweet Little Lies"
Chart (2022)	Peak position
Global 200 (Billboard)	177
US Billboard Hot 100	51
US Hot R&B/Hip-Hop Songs (Billboard)	15

== Certifications ==
Region	Certification	Certified units/sales
United States (RIAA)	Platinum	1,000,000^{‡}
^{‡} Sales+streaming figures based on certification alone.
