= 25 (song) =

2024 song by Rod Wave

Song by Rod Wave

from the album Last Lap
- Released: October 11, 2024
- Length: 3:00
- Label: Alamo
- Songwriters: Rodarius Green; Lee Spight; Temilade Openiyi; Seyi Sodimu; Ronald Banful; Akano Wisdom
- Producer: EELmatic

Music video
- "25" on YouTube

"25" is a song by American rapper Rod Wave, released on October 11, 2024, from his sixth studio album, Last Lap. Produced by EELmatic, it contains samples of "Love Me JeJe" by Tems.

== Composition ==
In the song, Rod Wave details struggling with lonesome feelings, depression and social anxiety, his strong wish to find true love and wondering if he ever will.

== Critical reception ==
Zachary Horvath of HotNewHipHop wrote of the song, "The relatability on this one makes it a standout, but it's also his pained vocals and ear-grabbing melody that contribute to us revisiting this one more and more."

== Charts ==
=== Weekly charts ===
Weekly chart performance for "25"
Chart (2024)	Peak position
Global 200 (Billboard)	48
New Zealand Hot Singles (RMNZ)	5
South Africa (TOSAC)	33
US Billboard Hot 100	16
US Hot R&B/Hip-Hop Songs (Billboard)	4
US Rhythmic Airplay (Billboard)	36

=== Year-end charts ===
Year-end chart performance for "25"
Chart (2025)	Position
US Hot R&B/Hip-Hop Songs (Billboard)	29

== Certifications ==
Region	Certification	Certified units/sales
United States (RIAA)	2× Platinum	2,000,000^{‡}
^{‡} Sales+streaming figures based on certification alone.
