= Break My Heart (Rod Wave song) =

2022 single by Rod Wave

Single by Rod Wave

from the EP Jupiter's Diary: 7 Day Theory
- Released: November 10, 2022
- Length: 2:49
- Label: Alamo
- Songwriters: Rodarius Green; Sam Smith; Thomas Horton; Antonio Ramos; Colorado; Mikkel Storleer Eriksen; Tor Erik Hermansen; Jimmy Napes
- Producers: TnTXD; TrillGotJuice; Colorado

Rod Wave singles chronology
| "Alone" (2022) | "Break My Heart" (2022) | "Got It Right" (2022) |

Music video
- "Break My Heart" on YouTube

"Break My Heart" is a song by American rapper Rod Wave, released on November 10, 2022, as the lead single from his debut EP Jupiter's Diary: 7 Day Theory (2022). It contains a sample of "Love Me More" by Sam Smith and was produced by TnTXD, TrillGotJuice and Colorado.

== Music video ==
The music video was released alongside the single. In it, Rod Wave spends quality time with his children, with beautiful, vibrant scenery of a body of water behind him, and cleans his collection of jewelry as well.

== Charts ==
Chart performance for "Break My Heart"
| Chart (2022) | Peak position |
|---|---|
| New Zealand Hot Singles (RMNZ) | 33 |
| US Billboard Hot 100 | 76 |
| US Hot R&B/Hip-Hop Songs (Billboard) | 23 |

== Certifications ==
| Region | Certification | Certified units/sales |
|---|---|---|
| United States (RIAA) | Gold | 500,000^{‡} |
^{‡} Sales+streaming figures based on certification alone.
