= Before I Go (Kodak Black song) =

2021 single by Kodak Black featuring Rod Wave

Single by Kodak Black featuring Rod Wave
- Released: July 23, 2021
- Genre: Emo rap
- Length: 3:24
- Label: Sniper Gang; Atlantic
- Songwriters: Bill Kapri; Rodarius Green; Derek Garcia; Russell Pochop; Max Perry; Vincent Tolan
- Producers: Dyryk; RBP; Perry; Tolan

Kodak Black singles chronology
"All the Way In" (2021)	"Before I Go" (2021)	"Grah Tah Tah" (2021)

Rod Wave singles chronology
"Forever Set in Stone" (2021)	"Before I Go" (2021)	"Time Heals" (2021)

Music video
- "Before I Go" on YouTube

"Before I Go" is a single by American rapper Kodak Black featuring American rapper Rod Wave, released on July 23, 2021. It was produced by Dyryk, RBP, Max Perry and Vincent Tolan.

== Background ==
The song was first teased a couple months before release, when Kodak Black revealed he was working on music with Rod Wave.

== Composition ==
"Before I Go" is an emo rap song, revolving around the rappers' tenacities in the midst of struggle. Both artists sing about how their loved ones will eventually die before them and not letting anyone take them away from their children and money "before they go", while Kodak Black also discusses the repercussions of street life.

== Music video ==
An official music video was released on August 6, 2021. Directed by DrewFilmedIt, it begins with a blood-stained bouquet of white roses. The clip shows a young man fighting for his life in prison and a single mother struggling to support her kids, along with scenes of funerals and Kodak Black holding a vulture on his shoulder in a swamp-covered jungle setting, where he is also joined by Rod Wave. Later, Black is seen digging a grave. An old television set also appears in the video, featuring footage of him returning to his native Golden Acres Projects in Pompano Beach, Florida and gifting 100 air conditioners to the community.

== Charts ==
Chart performance for "Before I Go"
Chart (2021)	Peak position
US Bubbling Under Hot 100 (Billboard)	10
US Hot R&B/Hip-Hop Songs (Billboard)	46
