= Sinners (song) =

2025 single by Rod Wave

Single by Rod Wave

from the album Sinners (Original Motion Picture Soundtrack)
- Released: April 4, 2025
- Length: 3:08
- Label: Alamo; Sony Music
- Songwriters: Rodarius Green; Tarkan Kozluklu; Darius Poviliūnas; Kyris D'Asia Mingo
- Producers: T5; Wonderyo; Prodbykyris; Travis Harrington

Rod Wave singles chronology
| "Westside Connection" (2025) | "Sinners" (2025) | "Leavin" (2025) |

Music video
- "Sinners" on YouTube

"Sinners" is a song by American rapper Rod Wave, released on April 4, 2025 as the lead single from the soundtrack to the 2025 film of the same name. It was produced by T5, Wonderyo, Prodbykyris and Travis Harrington.

== Content ==
In the song, Rod Wave reflects on his rise to stardom and dealing with setbacks along the way, while also comparing his journey to the African American struggle against slavery in the past and incorporating the film's theme of vampires.

== Music video ==
The music video was released alongside the single. Like the film Sinners, it was directed by Ryan Coogler and is set in the Jim Crow-era South during the 1930s. The clip sees Rod Wave riding through cotton fields in a Ford Model T and also includes scenes from the movie.

== Charts ==
Chart performance for "Sinners"
| Chart (2025) | Peak position |
|---|---|
| New Zealand Hot Singles (RMNZ) | 30 |
| US Bubbling Under Hot 100 (Billboard) | 1 |
| US Hot R&B/Hip-Hop Songs (Billboard) | 23 |
