= Gone till November (Rod Wave song) =

2021 song by Rod Wave

"Gone Till November"

Song by Rod Wave

from the album SoulFly
- Released: March 26, 2021
- Length: 2:41
- Label: Alamo; Geffen; Interscope
- Songwriters: Rodarius Green; Tevin Revell; Jaehyun Kim
- Producers: Drum Dummie; KimJ

"Gone Till November" is a song by American rapper and singer Rod Wave from his third studio album SoulFly (2021). It was produced by Drum Dummie and KimJ. The song contains a prolific sample of "Dear Mama" by Tupac Shakur.

== Critical reception ==
David Aaron Brake for HipHopDX stated that the song is "one of the album's best" and states that on the song, "we find Wave seeking to be understood". Brake wrote that "as he comes to terms with the fact that, despite his talent and rugged work ethic, there will always be people praying on his downfall".

== Charts ==
Chart performance for "Gone Till November"
Chart (2021)	Peak position
Global 200 (Billboard)	116
US Billboard Hot 100	61
US Hot R&B/Hip-Hop Songs (Billboard)	28

== Certifications ==
Region	Certification	Certified units/sales
United States (RIAA)	Gold	500,000^{‡}
^{‡} Sales+streaming figures based on certification alone.
