= Already Won =

2021 song by Rod Wave featuring Lil Durk

Song by Rod Wave featuring Lil Durk

from the album SoulFly
- Released: August 20, 2021
- Length: 3:32
- Label: Alamo
- Songwriters: Rodarius Green; Durk Banks; William Byrd
- Producer: Will-A-Fool

Music video
- "Already Won" on YouTube

"Already Won" is a song by American rapper Rod Wave from his third studio album SoulFly (2021), appearing on the deluxe version. The song features American rapper Lil Durk and was produced by Will-A-Fool. It samples "Can You Stand the Rain" by New Edition.

== Composition ==
In the song, Rod Wave and Lil Durk "flex on their exes" and reflect on balancing their relationships and fame, over a piano sample of "Can You Stand the Rain".

== Music video ==
The official music video premiered on September 28, 2021. It opens with a short monologue, in which Rod Wave talks about a childhood dream to become a drug dealer, and how the losses he experienced in pursuing it led to his decision to go into music instead. He and Lil Durk rap in spaces of a dimly lit room. Their performance is juxtaposed with recreated scenes from Wave's youth: standing around a casket with his family, visiting his father in prison, and lying in bed and dreaming about the future.

== Charts ==
Chart performance for "Already Won"
Chart (2021)	Peak position
Global 200 (Billboard)	109
US Billboard Hot 100	60
US Hot R&B/Hip-Hop Songs (Billboard)	19

== Certifications ==
Certifications for "Already Won"
Region	Certification	Certified units/sales
United States (RIAA)	2× Platinum	2,000,000^{‡}
^{‡} Sales+streaming figures based on certification alone.
