= Jupiter's Diary: 7 Day Theory =

EP by Rod Wave
- Released: November 18, 2022
- Length: 21:28
- Label: Alamo
- Producer: 254Bodi; BSquared; Colorado; EvrGrn; Fasbeats; Fridayy; Haze; Karltin Bankz; LondnBlue; Popstar Benny; Prodkayo; Red Jon; SenseiATL; Shaad K'Rounds; Tahj Money; TnTXD; TrillGotJuice; Tyler James; Will-A-Fool

Rod Wave chronology
Beautiful Mind (2022)	Jupiter's Diary: 7 Day Theory (2022)	Nostalgia (2023)

Singles from Jupiter's Diary: 7 Day Theory
- 1. "Break My Heart" Released: November 10, 2022

Jupiter's Diary: 7 Day Theory is the first EP by American rapper Rod Wave, released on November 17, 2022, by Alamo Records. The EP features production from Fridayy, Karltin Bankz, LondnBlue, and Shaad K'Rounds, while it serves as a follow up to Rod Wave's fourth studio album, Beautiful Mind (2022).

== Background ==
The EP's lead single, "Break My Heart", was released on November 10, 2022, alongside its official music video. Following the EP's release, on November 21, Rod Wave released the music video for "Got It Right", however, it was later taken down for unknown reasons.

== Critical reception ==
Professional ratings
Review scores
Source	Rating
AllMusic	3/5 stars

AllMusic's TiVo Staff wrote that Rod utilizes "melodic sung/rapped flows, pop-adjacent instrumentals" alongside "lyrical threads of trauma, heartbreak, and struggle". He wrote that the EP "delivers on everything fans have come to expect".

== Track listing ==
Jupiter's Diary: 7 Day Theory track listing
No.	Title	Writer(s)	Producer(s)	Length
1.	"Break My Heart"	Rodarius Green; Evgeny Ermakov; Thomas Horton; Antonio Ramos; Samuel Smith; Mikkel S. Eriksen; Tor E. Hermansen; James Napier	Colorado; TnTXD; TrillGotJuice	2:49
2.	"Got It Right"	Green; Amman Nurani; Rashaad Green; Horton; Tyler James	254Bodi; EvrGrn; Shaad K'Rounds; TnTXD; Tyler James	3:34
3.	"The Answer is No"	Green; Francis Leblanc; Ethan Hayes; Horton	Fridayy; Haze; TnTXD	2:37
4.	"Jupiter's Diary"	Green; Lukas Payne; Sterling Reynolds; Tahj Vaughn; Horton; Ruth Berhe; Terence Blanchard	Karltin Bankz; LondnBlue; Tahj Money; TnTXD	2:28
5.	"Love Overdose"	Green; Ben Bull; Willie Byrd	BSquared; Will-A-Fool	2:22
6.	"MJ Story"	Green; Reynolds; R. Green; Horton	LondnBlue; Shaad K'Rounds; TnTXD	2:40
7.	"Just Sing"	Green; Fedor Sommerfeld; Oscar Knight; Joao Camarneiro; Alex O'Shaughnessy; Luz Corrigan	Fasbeats; Prodkayo; Red Jon	2:46
8.	"Don't Need"	Green; Chason Howard; Ariel Silva	Popstar Benny; SenseiATL	2:12
Total length:				21:28

Sample credits

- "Break My Heart" contains a sample of "Love Me More", written by Samuel Smith, Tor E. Hermansen, Mikkel S. Eriksen, and James Napier, as performed by Sam Smith.
- "Jupiter's Diary" contains a sample of "Paper Airplanes", written by Ruth Berhe and Terence Blanchard, as performed by Ruth B.

== Charts ==
Weekly chart performance for Jupiter's Diary: 7 Day Theory
Chart (2022)	Peak position
US Billboard 200	9
US Top R&B/Hip-Hop Albums (Billboard)	5
