= Home Ain't Home =

2022 song by YoungBoy Never Broke Again featuring Rod Wave

Song by YoungBoy Never Broke Again featuring Rod Wave

from the album The Last Slimeto
- Released: August 5, 2022
- Length: 2:22
- Label: Never Broke Again; Atlantic
- Songwriters: Kentrell DeSean Gaulden; Rodarius Marcell Green; Jason Michael Goldberg; Daniel Lebrun; Vilyam Vardumyan; Benjamin Hubble; Giovanni Rana
- Producers: Cheese; D-Roc; Hzrd; LayZBeats; Vani

Audio video
- "Home Ain't Home" on YouTube

"Home Ain't Home" is a song by American rapper YoungBoy Never Broke Again featuring fellow American rapper Rod Wave, released on August 5, 2022, as the thirteenth track from the former's fourth studio album, The Last Slimeto. The track finds the artists performing over a mellow R&B instrumental, discussing their struggles with love and relationships.

== Composition ==
"Home Ain't Home" is "a nimble, deeply affecting workout". The song's title serves as a metaphor for the artists noting that their money can't bring them happiness as YoungBoy raps: "feelin' like my home ain't no home". However, the name shares a double meaning as it can also be interpreted as the artist feeling like their house isn't home due to the lack of love inside. YoungBoy's verse is described to "[swing] skillfully between reflection and regret" whereas "Rod Wave’s melodramatic wails break the mood." It's also noted that YoungBoy "deploys [autotune] strategically on choruses" and that he has "cut back on the weepy Autotuned cheese he slathered over past projects like 2020's Top."

== Critical reception ==
Clash's Robin Murray noted that Rod Wave's features "come[s] close to stealing the show." Alongside "My Go To," the track is noted as, "the best ballad-y type tracks on the album; proving once again that YoungBoy, stylistically, is a strong collaborator for anyone in music right now."

== Charts ==
Chart performance for "Home Ain't Home"
Chart (2022)	Peak position
Global 200 (Billboard)	181
US Billboard Hot 100	47
US Hot R&B/Hip-Hop Songs (Billboard)	14

== Certifications ==
Region	Certification	Certified units/sales
United States (RIAA)	Gold	500,000^{‡}
^{‡} Sales+streaming figures based on certification alone.
