= Letter from Houston =

2020 song by Rod Wave

Song by Rod Wave

from the album Pray 4 Love (Deluxe)
- Released: August 7, 2020
- Length: 2:53
- Label: Alamo
- Songwriter: Rodarius Green
- Producers: LondnBlue; Karltin Bankz; TnTXD; Tahj Money

Music video
- "Letter from Houston" on YouTube

"Letter from Houston" is a song by American rapper and singer Rod Wave, released on August 7, 2020, as part of the deluxe edition of his second studio album Pray 4 Love. The song's intro samples the 2009 song "Delirious" by American R&B duo Vistoso Bosses and rapper Soulja Boy. The song finds Rod Wave writing a "heartfelt" letter to his loved one who he is in a long-distance relationship with.

== Critical reception ==
Billboard's Carl Lamarre said the rapper "writes an endearing note to his love". Similarly, Paul Duong of Rap Radar labelled the song a "heartfelt letter" that Rod Wave pens to his missed love one. AllHipHop named the song a highlight from Pray 4 Love, and said Wave delivers a "soul-snatching croon".

== Music video ==
The official video was released on August 6, 2020. The TruFilms-directed visual shows the effects of stardom on Rod's relationship with his lover. He is seen in the driver's seat of a Rolls-Royce and in a dark room dimmed with a light.

== Charts ==
Chart performance for "Letter from Houston"
Chart (2020)	Peak position
US Billboard Hot 100	62
US Hot R&B/Hip-Hop Songs (Billboard)	24
US Rolling Stone Top 100	29

== Certifications ==
Certifications for "Letter from Houston"
Region	Certification	Certified units/sales
United States (RIAA)	3× Platinum	3,000,000^{‡}
^{‡} Sales+streaming figures based on certification alone.
