= Nostalgia (Rod Wave album) =

Studio album by Rod Wave
- Released: September 15, 2023
- Genres: Hip-hop; R&B
- Length: 55:25
- Label: Alamo
- Producers: Adé; Aldaz; Amineskkrt; ATonOnMyMind; Ayo Bleu; AyoKxnzo; BeatsByJuko; BeatsByTrain; Bsquared; Camm; Desirez Beats; DKeyz; Dubba K Beats; Dvosk; Eelmatic; EgonBeUp; Fasbeats; FlexOnDaTrack; Fraxille; Gabe Lucas; Geo Vocals; JLH; Keyman; Landers; LayZBeats; LondnBlue; McCoy; Reach High Eli; Ronny J; Ryan Bevolo; SephGotTheWaves; ThatBossEvan; TnTXD; TrillGotJuice; Will-A-Fool; Xyn

Rod Wave chronology
Jupiter's Diary: 7 Day Theory (2022)	Nostalgia (2023)	Last Lap (2024)

Singles from Nostalgia
- 1. "Fight the Feeling" Released: March 31, 2023; 2. "Call Your Friends" Released: August 18, 2023; 3. "Come See Me" Released: September 1, 2023; 4. "Boyz Don't Cry" Released: September 13, 2023; 5. "Checkmate" Released: September 14, 2023

Nostalgia is the fifth studio album by American rapper and singer Rod Wave, released on September 15, 2023, through Alamo Records. The album features guest appearances from 21 Savage, Sadie Jean, and Wet, while the production was handled by Ayo Bleu, FlexOnDaTrack, LayZBeats, LondnBlue, Ronny J, SephGotTheWaves, and TnTXD, alongside several others. The album serves as a follow-up to Green's fourth studio album, Beautiful Mind (2022), and his EP, Jupiter's Diary: 7 Day Theory (2022).

Nostalgia received positive reviews from music critics, who praised the album's lyrical vulnerability and melodic flows. It debuted atop the US Billboard 200 chart for selling 137,000 album-equivalent units, 1,500 of which were pure album sales. Serving as Green's third consecutive number one on the chart, each of the album's eighteen tracks entered the Billboard Hot 100. In its second week, the album stayed atop the chart, moving an additional 88,000 units. In May 2024, Nostalgia was listed amongst Sony Music's highest grossing albums of the fiscal year. It was supported by five singles: "Fight the Feeling", "Call Your Friends", "Come See Me", "Boyz Don't Cry", and "Checkmate".

== Background and recording ==
Upon the album's release, Green appeared in an interview with Nick and Eddie from Apple Music 1's Rap Life Radio. During the interview, Green revealed how on the album, he was able to express himself to his fullest: "I feel like on this album, I was able to spread my emotions around. I have more time just to touch bases on different kind of points of views, on different subjects", describing music as "therapy" for him. When asked about the album's title, Green went in-depth and revealed the background behind the title:

Over the years, you know what I’m saying? I done let, I done let, I done let lot of it out, you know what I’m saying? And just, it was just therapy for me, you know what I’m saying? But this album, the reason why I even named it Nostalgia is, you know what I’m saying? Just ‘cause I always remember where I was at. Every interview I did, every person, every face I met, every song, every video I shot, I remember where I was at, how I was feeling, what I was doing, so, I just had to realize, this is nostalgic. Everything I put out in the world, in the universe, I'ma be able to look back at it, like, “Damn, I remember that time, I remember this,” you know what I’m saying? It’s all special to me. So, yeah, this album, man, I just feel different, you know what I’m saying?

During his interview with Gillie Da Kid and Wallo267 of Million Dollaz Worth of Game, Green spoke about his song selection process, stating that he'd pick a certain amount of songs to "gain new fans" some tracks for his new fans, and some tracks for his core fanbase.

== Release and promotion ==
Rod Wave released the lead single of the album, "Fight the Feeling", on March 31, 2023. The song provoked negative feedback with people opining that his music became "too emotional". However, he claimed that he wrote the song with his haters on his mind. On August 16, 2023, Rod announced the album and released the second single "Call Your Friends" two days later. He also addressed allegations of having moved the release date several times before, saying that this was his first time mentioning any date while sharing the album's official artwork. On September 1, Rod Wave released the album's third single, "Come See Me". On September 11, Rod announced the Nostalgia Tour, a North American tour for the album that is set to take place from October to December 2023. The 35-date tour through North America will be backed by special guests Ari Lennox, Toosii, G Herbo, and Eelmatic. On September 13, the album's fourth single, "Boyz Don't Cry" was released as an Amazon Music acoustic exclusive. The album's fifth and final single, "Checkmate" was released on September 14, just a day prior to the album's release.

Following the release of the album, Green's late uncle and manager, Dereck "Dee" Lane appeared in an interview with Billboard in which he spoke about pushing Green to promote the album more than his previous records:

The key to Rod’s success is his team. We’re grass rooted. Yes, Nostalgia is our standout album, but we didn’t change the approach that we take when it comes to the music. [...] You’re in the industry so I’m sure you know that Rod doesn’t do a lot of album promo. The whole team felt that this album was definitely a special one. With that being said, I pushed him to do as much promo as possible to make sure we got the word out while also continuing to maintain and stay true to himself.

== Critical reception ==
Professional ratings
Review scores
Source	Rating
AllMusic	3/5 stars
HipHopDX	3.7/5 stars

Nostalgia received mediocre reviews from critics. Writing for AllMusic, TiVo Staff stated that his "emotional delivery, melodic flows, gospel underpinnings, and pop-friendly approach to trap" have a similar delivery to that of his previous studio album, Beautiful Mind (2022). He stated that "there's a unified feeling throughout the almost-hour-long project, and it reaches its highest points right around the middle of the journey". HipHopDX's Isaac Fontes stated that "[Rod Wave's] soulful reflections over Trap beats laced with booming 808s accompanied by either a twinkling piano loop or a drawling guitar riff, is a contrast that works because of the depths of his lyrics." He noted that "authenticity and deeply introspective lyrics" play a major factor in why "his movement [is] so powerful".

=== Year-end lists ===
Select year-end rankings of Nostalgia
Publication	List	Rank	Ref.
Los Angeles Times	The 20 Best Albums of 2023	14	

== Controversy ==
On November 18, 2023, Boosie Badazz took to social media to state that he planned to file a lawsuit against Rod Wave over an uncleared sample on "Long Journey" from Boosie's track of the same title, featuring Webbie. Boosie claimed that Rod Wave stole his lyrics and that he just wants his "split" and his "cut". On the same day, Boosie "unleashed" on Rod Wave, alleging that Rod was stealing from Boosie's children by not properly clearing the track. Just hours later, Rod Wave responded to Boosie's allegations stating that he'd pay him and a lawsuit wasn't required, however, just a day later, Boosie teased a diss track seemingly aimed at Rod: "For years I let you n****s slide, hoping that I get that phone call like n**** you can't get 25%, but I never got it / Not keeping it real so let's keep it real". Following the diss track tease, Rod Wave took to his Twitter to state that he'd never steal a song from another artist while taking aim at Boosie and stating that he was planning to retire from music. Days later, during an Instagram live, Boosie confirmed that Rod Wave failed to pay him and that he plans to go forward with the lawsuit. The following month, Boosie went on a "rant" on Instagram live alleging that Row would rather pay a lawyer than him.

== Commercial performance ==
In the United States, Nostalgia debuted atop the Billboard 200, earning 137,000 album-equivalent units (including 1,500 in pure sales) in its first week. It became Wave's third number-one on the chart and sixth top-ten. The album also accumulated a total of 187.51 million on-demand streams of its songs. In its second week, the album remained at number one on the chart, moving an additional 88,000 units, a 500-unit margin above closest challenger Olivia Rodrigo's Guts. The album was certified gold by the Recording Industry Association of America on November 17, 2023. As of December 2023, Beautiful Mind was the 44th best-selling album in the United States, moving over 757,000 album-equivalent units in the year, consisting of 3,300 pure sales, 20,000 song sales, 952,422,000 audio streams, and 148,228,000 video streams. On May 14, 2024, Sony Music reported a 17% increase in revenue in the fiscal year. Green's Nostalgia was listed among the top-earning projects released through the label. On September 16, the album was certified platinum, signifying a million units sold.

== Track listing ==
Nostalgia track listing
No.	Title	Writer(s)	Producer(s)	Length
1.	"Nostalgia" (with Wet)	Rodarius Green; Kelly Zutrau; Joe Valle; Lee Spight III	Eelmatic	2:43
2.	"Long Journey"	Green; Bryan Beachley; Daniel Voskoboynik; Cameron Holmes; Fedor Sommerfeld	BeatsByTrain; Dvosk; Camm; FasBeats; ATonOnMyMind	3:05
3.	"Call Your Friends"	Green; Beachley; Ryan Bevolo; Evan McCoy	BeatsByTrain; Bevolo; Landers; McCoy	2:33
4.	"HG4"	Green; Beachley; David Cabral; Braylen Rembert	BeatsByTrain; DKeyz; Ayo Bleu	2:00
5.	"Come See Me"	Green; Gabriel Lucas	Gabe Lucas; Desirez Beats	3:10
6.	"Crazy"	Green; Ryan Harroud; Beachley; Anthony Villena; Hayley Williams; Taylor York	Xyn; BeatsByTrain; Keyman	2:10
7.	"Love for a Thug"	Green; Beachley; Konsta Korhonen	BeatsByTrain; Dubba K Beats	3:04
8.	"Checkmate"	Green; Beachley; Holmes; Jonas Gumdal	BeatsByTrain; Camm; Fraxille	3:17
9.	"Fight the Feeling"	Green; Beachley; Souiyate Amine; Daniel Yenuen Aldaz Leander; Evenson Clauseille	BeatsByTrain; Amineskkrt; Aldaz; ThatBossEvan	2:40
10.	"Turks & Caicos" (featuring 21 Savage)	Green; Shéyaa Abraham-Joseph; Philip Adetumbi; Justin Smith; Tom Brock; Robert Relf; Barry Bailey; Charles Fleming; George Belton; Larry Miller; Reginald Payne	Adé	3:23
11.	"Boyz Don't Cry"	Green; Beachley; Eric Todd-Williams	BeatsByTrain; EgonBeUp; AyoKxnzo; JLH	2:46
12.	"Pass You By"	Green; Willie Byrd; Ben Bull	Will-A-Fool; Bsquared	3:12
13.	"Great Gatsby"	Green; Thomas Horton; Antonio Ramos; Joseph Boyden; Felix Govaerts; Georgia Boyden	TnTXD; TrillGotJuice; SephGotTheWaves; FlexOnDaTrack; Geo Vocals; Reach High Eli	2:26
14.	"Keep It G"	Green; Horton; Ramos; Sterling van Reynolds	TnTXD; TrillGotJuice; LondnBlue	4:00
15.	"Love Story/Interlude"	Green; Beachley; Byrd; Holmes; Benjamin Hubble; Bull	BeatsByTrain; Will-A-Fool; Camm; LayZBeats; Bsquared	5:16
16.	"Rap Beef"	Green; Bull; Byrd	Bsquared; Will-A-Fool	3:28
17.	"Back Lit"	Green; Ronald Spence Jr.; Jacob Sclaver	Ronny J; BeatsByJuko	2:58
18.	"2018" (with Sadie Jean)	Green; Sadie Wilcox; Spight	Eelmatic	3:14
Total length:				55:25

Sample credits

- "Nostalgia" contains samples of "Where Did the Day Go", written by Kelly Zutrau, Joe Valle, and Marty Sulko, as performed by Wet.
- "Long Journey" contains an interpolation of "Long Journey", written by Torence Ivy Hatch Jr. and Webster Gradney Jr., as performed by Boosie Badazz and Webbie.
- "Crazy" contains samples and an interpolation of "Ain't It Fun", written by Hayley Williams and Taylor York, as performed by Paramore.
- "Turks & Caicos" contains an interpolation of "Girls, Girls, Girls", written by Shawn Carter, Tom Brock, and Justin Smith, as performed by Jay-Z.
- "Keep It G" contains samples of "Back to Blue", written and performed by Dora Pereli.
- "Love Story/Interlude" contains samples of "Song to a Seagull", written and performed by Joni Mitchell.
- "2018" contains samples of "WYD Now?", written by Sadie Wilcox, David Alexander, and Grace Enger, as performed by Sadie Jean.

== Charts ==
=== Weekly charts ===
Weekly chart performance for Nostalgia
Chart (2023)	Peak position
Australian Hitseekers Albums (ARIA)	6
Canadian Albums (Billboard)	29
New Zealand Albums (RMNZ)	18
UK Albums (Official Charts)	46
US Billboard 200	1
US Top R&B/Hip-Hop Albums (Billboard)	1

=== Year-end charts ===
2023 year-end chart performance for Nostalgia
Chart (2023)	Position
US Billboard 200	156
US Top R&B/Hip-Hop Albums (Billboard)	45

2024 year-end chart performance for Nostalgia
Chart (2024)	Position
US Billboard 200	25
US Top R&B/Hip-Hop Albums (Billboard)	6

2025 year-end chart performance for Nostalgia
Chart (2025)	Position
US Billboard 200	185
US Top R&B/Hip-Hop Albums (Billboard)	95

== Certifications ==
Certifications for Nostalgia
Region	Certification	Certified units/sales
United States (RIAA)	2× Platinum	2,000,000^{‡}
^{‡} Sales+streaming figures based on certification alone.

== Release history ==
Release dates and formats for Nostalgia
Region	Date	Label(s)	Format(s)	Edition(s)	Ref.
Various	September 15, 2023	Alamo	Digital download; streaming	Standard	
United States	January 26, 2024	Alamo	LP	Standard	
Europe	January 26, 2024	Alamo	LP	Standard	
United States	November 1, 2024	Alamo	LP	Standard	

== See also ==
- 2023 in hip-hop
- List of Billboard 200 number-one albums of 2023
