= Fight the Feeling (song) =

Single by Rod Wave

from the album Nostalgia
- Released: March 31, 2023
- Length: 2:40
- Label: Alamo
- Songwriter: Rodarius Green
- Producers: BeatsbyTrain; Amineskkrt; Aldaz; ThatBossEvan

Rod Wave singles chronology
"Got It Right" (2022)	"Fight the Feeling" (2023)	"Call Your Friends" (2023)

Music video
- "Fight the Feeling" on YouTube

"Fight the Feeling" is a song written and performed by American rapper and singer Rod Wave, released on March 31, 2023, as the lead single from his fifth studio album Nostalgia. It was produced by BeatsbyTrain, Amineskkrt, Aldaz and ThatBossEvan. The track peaked at #16 on the Billboard Hot 100 and #7 on the Billboard Hot R&B/Hip-Hop Songs chart.

== Composition ==
The song is built on a rolling percussion beat and piano keys in its production. Lyrically, Rod Wave tells a story of a woman who tries to hide her feelings of pain from the end of a relationship by dressing up and going to the club: "So get your hair did, put your clothes on / Tell the DJ to play your song / Tryna fight the feeling, But she never finished healing / Now you in the middle of the club, trying not to cry to a love song".

== Critical reception ==
Alexander Cole of HotNewHipHop gave the song a "Very Hotttt" rating and wrote, "As for his singing, well, it is exactly what you would expect from Wave. He sounds fantastic all throughout the song, and there is no doubt he is an exceptional talent."

== Music video ==
An official music video premiered alongside the single. In it, Rod Wave performs live at a nightclub, where the woman in the story dances the night away with her friends while trying to fight her emotions, hence why it is called 'Fight the Feeling'.

== Charts ==
=== Weekly charts ===
Weekly chart performance for "Fight the Feeling"
Chart (2023)	Peak position
New Zealand Hot Singles (RMNZ)	22
Global 200 (Billboard)	57
US Billboard Hot 100	16
US Hot R&B/Hip-Hop Songs (Billboard)	7
US Rhythmic Airplay (Billboard)	8

=== Year-end charts ===
Year-end chart performance for "Fight the Feeling"
Chart (2023)	Position
US Hot R&B/Hip-Hop Songs (Billboard)	30
US Rhythmic (Billboard)	38

== Certifications ==
Certifications for "Fight the Feeling"
Region	Certification	Certified units/sales
United States (RIAA)	3× Platinum	3,000,000^{‡}
^{‡} Sales+streaming figures based on certification alone.
