= Call Your Friends (song) =

2023 single by Rod Wave

Single by Rod Wave

from the album Nostalgia
- Released: August 18, 2023
- Length: 2:33
- Label: Alamo
- Songwriter: Rodarius Green
- Producers: BeatsbyTrain; Ryan Bevolo; Landers; McCoy

Rod Wave singles chronology
"Fight the Feeling" (2023)	"Call Your Friends" (2023)	"Come See Me" (2023)

Music video
- "Call Your Friends" on YouTube

"Call Your Friends" is a song written and performed by American rapper and singer Rod Wave, released on August 18, 2023, as the second single from his fifth studio album Nostalgia. It was produced by BeatsbyTrain, Ryan Bevolo, Landers, and McCoy. The track peaked at #18 on the Billboard Hot 100 and #7 on the Billboard Hot R&B/Hip-Hop Songs chart.

== Content ==
The song deals with themes of friendship, loyalty, and relationships. In the lyrics, Rod Wave first mentions the ending of a relationship between him and his baby mama, and how it affects his kids. He then discusses how spending money on luxury items will not solve his problems and the importance of keeping up with one's friends.

== Critical reception ==
Alexander Cole of HotNewHipHop gave a positive review, writing "The song is beautifully sung, and the instrumentation matches up quite nicely. Ultimately, this is a great track that you need to give a listen. It also serves as a solid preview for his upcoming project."

== Music video ==
An official music video premiered alongside the single. It features "documentary-style footage" of Rod Wave on the road and spending time with his family.

== Charts ==
=== Weekly charts ===
Weekly chart performance for "Call Your Friends"
Chart (2023)	Peak position
Global 200 (Billboard)	84
New Zealand Hot Singles (RMNZ)	14
US Billboard Hot 100	18
US Hot R&B/Hip-Hop Songs (Billboard)	7

=== Year-end charts ===
2023 year-end chart performance for "Call Your Friends"
Chart (2023)	Position
US Hot R&B/Hip-Hop Songs (Billboard)	83

2024 year-end chart performance for "Call Your Friends"
Chart (2024)	Position
US Hot R&B/Hip-Hop Songs (Billboard)	94

== Certifications ==
Certifications for "Call Your Friends"
Region	Certification	Certified units/sales
United States (RIAA)	2× Platinum	2,000,000^{‡}
^{‡} Sales+streaming figures based on certification alone.
