= Nostalgia (Rod Wave and Wet song) =

2023 song by Rod Wave and Wet

Song by Rod Wave and Wet

from the album Nostalgia
- Released: September 15, 2023
- Length: 2:43
- Label: Alamo
- Songwriters: Rodarius Green; Kelly Zutrau; Joe Valle; Lee Spight III
- Producer: Eelmatic

"Nostalgia" is a song by American rapper Rod Wave and American band Wet. It is the opening track of the former's fifth studio album of the same name (2023). Produced by Eelmatic, it is Wet's first song to reach the Billboard Hot 100, peaking at number 40.

== Charts ==
Chart performance for "Nostalgia"
Chart (2023)	Peak position
Global 200 (Billboard)	158
US Billboard Hot 100	40
US Hot R&B/Hip-Hop Songs (Billboard)	15
