= Turks & Caicos (song) =

2023 song by Rod Wave featuring 21 Savage

Song by Rod Wave featuring 21 Savage

from the album Nostalgia
- Released: September 15, 2023
- Length: 3:23
- Label: Alamo
- Songwriters: Rodarius Green; Shéyaa Abraham-Joseph; Philip Adetumbi
- Producer: Adé

"Turks & Caicos" is a song by American rapper Rod Wave featuring Atlanta-based rapper 21 Savage, released from the former's fifth studio album Nostalgia (2023). It was produced by Adé.

== Content ==
The lyrics of the song focus on Rod Wave becoming absorbed in and acting on lust.

== Critical reception ==
Preezy Brown and Armon Sadler of Vibe commented that 21 Savage's appearance on the song is "accounting for the lone blockbuster feature on the long player." Isaac Fontes responded negatively to the song, writing that Rod Wave's "mundane delivery on the hook of the 21 Savage-assisted 'Turks & Caicos' expose the simplicity of some of his problems".

== Charts ==
=== Weekly charts ===
Weekly chart performance for "Turks & Caicos"
Chart (2023)	Peak position
Global 200 (Billboard)	92
New Zealand Hot Singles (RMNZ)	29
US Billboard Hot 100	24
US Hot R&B/Hip-Hop Songs (Billboard)	9

=== Year-end charts ===
2024 year-end chart performance for "Turks & Caicos"
Chart (2024)	Position
US Hot R&B/Hip-Hop Songs (Billboard)	71

== Certifications ==
Region	Certification	Certified units/sales
United States (RIAA)	Platinum	1,000,000^{‡}
^{‡} Sales+streaming figures based on certification alone.
