= Long Journey =

2023 song by Rod Wave

Song by Rod Wave

from the album Nostalgia
- Released: September 15, 2023
- Length: 3:05
- Label: Alamo
- Songwriters: Rodarius Green; Bryan Beachley; Daniel Voskoboynik; Cameron Holmes; Fedor Sommerfeld
- Producers: BeatsByTrain; Dvosk; Camm; FasBeats; ATonOnMyMind

"Long Journey" is a song by American rapper Rod Wave from his fifth studio album Nostalgia (2023). It was produced by BeatsByTrain, Dvosk, Camm, FasBeats and ATonOnMyMind.

== Composition ==
The song has been described as a "twangy tune". Lyrically, Rod Wave reflects on growing up in his teenage years and propelling to fame, as well as his faith in God, crediting it for his success.

== Charts ==
Chart performance for "Long Journey"
Chart (2023)	Peak position
Global 200 (Billboard)	148
New Zealand Hot Singles (RMNZ)	26
US Billboard Hot 100	39
US Hot R&B/Hip-Hop Songs (Billboard)	14

== Certifications ==
Region	Certification	Certified units/sales
United States (RIAA)	Platinum	1,000,000^{‡}
^{‡} Sales+streaming figures based on certification alone.
