= Dark Clouds (Rod Wave song) =

2019 single by Rod Wave

Single by Rod Wave

from the album Pray 4 Love
- Released: November 21, 2019
- Genre: Trap
- Length: 2:49
- Label: Alamo
- Songwriters: Rodarius Green; Trentay Robinson
- Producers: Mook on the Beat; Trillo Beatz

Rod Wave singles chronology
"Close Enough to Hurt" (2019)	"Dark Clouds" (2019)	"Misunderstood" (2019)

Music video
- "Dark Clouds" on YouTube

"Dark Clouds" is a song by American rapper Rod Wave, released on November 21, 2019 by Alamo Records. It is the lead single from his second studio album Pray 4 Love (2019).

== Composition ==
The song finds Rod Wave soulfully singing about the dark times in his life, such as overcoming his pain and his depression and isolation, as well as dealing with his newfound fame and love for his family. It has been described as a trap ballad.

== Music video ==
A music video for the song was released. It features clips of Rod Wave in the studio, with rappers Meek Mill and Calboy in sessions, performing the opening act for Kevin Gates' I'm Him Tour, and posing with his grandmother.

== Charts ==
Chart (2020)	Peak position
US Bubbling Under Hot 100 (Billboard)	1

== Certifications ==
Region	Certification	Certified units/sales
United States (RIAA)	2× Platinum	2,000,000^{‡}
^{‡} Sales+streaming figures based on certification alone.
