= Great Gatsby (song) =

2023 song by Rod Wave

Song by Rod Wave

from the album Nostalgia
- Released: September 15, 2023
- Length: 2:26
- Label: Alamo
- Songwriters: Rodarius Green; Thomas Horton; Antonio Ramos; Joseph Boyden; Felix Govaerts; Georgia Boyden
- Producers: TnTXD; TrillGotJuice; SephGotTheWaves; FlexOnDaTrack; Geo Vocals; Reach High Eli

"Great Gatsby" is a song by American rapper Rod Wave, released on September 15, 2023 from his fifth studio album Nostalgia. It was produced by TnTXD, TrillGotJuice, SephGotTheWaves, FlexOnDaTrack, Geo Vocals and Reach High Eli. The song features additional vocals from Geo Vocals.

== Background ==
The title of the song originates from the 1925 novel of the same name. In May 2023, Rod Wave previewed the song in an Instagram story.

== Charts ==
=== Weekly charts ===
Weekly chart performance for "Great Gatsby"
Chart (2023)	Peak position
Global 200 (Billboard)	128
New Zealand Hot Singles (RMNZ)	23
US Billboard Hot 100	30
US Hot R&B/Hip-Hop Songs (Billboard)	9

=== Year-end charts ===
2024 year-end chart performance for "Great Gatsby"
Chart (2024)	Position
US Hot R&B/Hip-Hop Songs (Billboard)	56

== Certifications ==
Region	Certification	Certified units/sales
United States (RIAA)	2× Platinum	2,000,000^{‡}
^{‡} Sales+streaming figures based on certification alone.
