= Girl of My Dreams (Rod Wave song) =

2020 single by Rod Wave

Single by Rod Wave

from the album Pray 4 Love (Deluxe)
- Released: May 1, 2020
- Length: 2:40
- Label: Alamo; UMG
- Songwriters: Rodarius Green; Alexabier Maxwell
- Producer: Ace Lex

Rod Wave singles chronology
"And I Still" (2020)	"Girl of My Dreams" (2020)	"Through the Wire" (2020)

Music video
- "Girl Of My Dreams" on YouTube

"Girl of My Dreams" is a song by American rapper and singer Rod Wave, and the sixth single from his second studio album Pray 4 Love, appearing on the deluxe edition.

== Background and composition ==
As the title suggests, Rod Wave melodically fantasizes about the woman of his dreams, sing-rapping about what he sees in her. The instrumental of the song, produced by Ace Lex, contains a sample of "Bullet" by Tula.

== Music video ==
The music video was released on May 3, 2020. It features Rod Wave in his bedroom daydreaming about a woman he loves, and a silhouette of a beautiful African-American woman appears in the visual as well.

== Charts ==
=== Weekly charts ===
Chart (2020)	Peak position
US Billboard Hot 100	65
US Hot R&B/Hip-Hop Songs (Billboard)	25
US Rhythmic Airplay (Billboard)	19

=== Year-end charts ===
Chart (2020)	Position
US Hot R&B/Hip-Hop Songs (Billboard)	89

== Certifications ==
Region	Certification	Certified units/sales
United States (RIAA)	3× Platinum	3,000,000^{‡}
^{‡} Sales+streaming figures based on certification alone.
