= Heart on Ice =

2019 debut single by Rod Wave

Single by Rod Wave

from the album PTSD and Ghetto Gospel
- Released: May 31, 2019
- Length: 2:39
- Label: Alamo
- Songwriters: Rodarius Green; Johnathan Smith Servance; Lance Donavan Bledsoe; Malik Warren Bynoe-Fisher
- Producers: Dicaprio Beatz; Malik; Speaker Bangerz

Rod Wave singles chronology
"Popular Loner" (2019)	"Heart on Ice" (2019)	"Paint the Sky Red" (2019)

Music video
- "Heart On Ice" on YouTube

Remix cover
- Cover art of the official remix featuring Lil Durk.

Lil Durk singles chronology
"G:Code" (2019)	"Heart on Ice (Remix)" (2019)	"Aye Migo" (2019)

"Heart on Ice" is song by American rapper and singer Rod Wave, released on May 31, 2019, as a single for his fifth mixtape PTSD. The remix of the song, featuring American rapper Lil Durk, was released on September 27, 2019, as a single for Wave's debut studio album Ghetto Gospel (2019).

== Background ==
The song was first released as a music video on May 22, 2019. On May 31, the single was released. It would serve as the lead single from Rod Wave's fifth mixtape PTSD, released on June 14, 2019. Though it debuted on the Billboard Hot 100 for the issue dated November 23, 2019, it received even more widespread attention after it went viral on TikTok in 2020. Peaking at number 25 on the chart, it became his first top 40 entry.

== Composition ==
Pitchfork describes the song as Rod Wave switching between his singing styles "with ease, pairing his melody with a growing ability to write about heartbreak and pain."

== Critical reception ==
Alphonse Pierre of Pitchfork wrote "Rod Wave is still finding his footing, but 'Heart on Ice' is evidence that he already possesses one of the best voices in the South." Pitchfork also included "Heart on Ice" in their list "The Best Rap Songs of 2019".

== Remix ==
The remix, featuring Lil Durk, was released on September 27, 2019, as the lead single from Rod Wave's debut studio album Ghetto Gospel. Its music video premiered a day earlier.

== Charts ==
=== Weekly charts ===
Chart (2020)	Peak position
Canada Hot 100 (Billboard)	77
US Billboard Hot 100	25
US Hot R&B/Hip-Hop Songs (Billboard)	13
US Rhythmic Airplay (Billboard)	10
US Rolling Stone Top 100	16

=== Year-end charts ===
Chart (2020)	Position
US Billboard Hot 100	51
US Hot R&B/Hip-Hop Songs (Billboard)	26
US Rhythmic (Billboard)	42

== Certifications ==
Region	Certification	Certified units/sales
United Kingdom (BPI)	Silver	200,000^{‡}
United States (RIAA)	5× Platinum	5,000,000^{‡}
^{‡} Sales+streaming figures based on certification alone.
