= Rags2Riches (song) =

2020 song by Rod Wave

Song by Rod Wave featuring ATR Son Son

from the album Pray 4 Love
- Released: April 3, 2020
- Length: 2:47
- Label: Alamo
- Songwriters: Rodarius Green; Adam Janeček; Adarsh Mani
- Producers: DaySix; Zypitano

Audio video
- "Rags2Riches 2" on YouTube

"Rags2Riches" is a song by American rapper and singer Rod Wave featuring fellow American rapper ATR Son Son, released on April 3, 2020 as a track from the former's second studio album Pray 4 Love. It garnered popularity on video-sharing app TikTok, being featured in over 5 million videos as of July 2020. An alternate version titled "Rags2Riches 2" featuring Lil Baby was included on the deluxe edition of Pray 4 Love, released August 7, 2020.

== Background ==
The song was recorded at a hotel while Rod Wave was touring. Comparing the song to another album track, "Ribbons In the Sky", Micah Peters of The Ringer said "Rags2Riches" is "inspiring without being so melodramatic". HotNewHipHop's Alexander Cole called Lil Baby's feature on "Rags2Riches 2" a standout and said the song "comes across like a ballad of sorts, as both artists go in-depth on their success and how they grew up with nothing".

== Charts ==
=== Weekly charts ===
==== Rags2Riches ====
| Chart (2020) | Peak position |
|---|---|
| Canada Hot 100 (Billboard) | 50 |
| Ireland (IRMA) | 41 |
| New Zealand Hot Singles (RMNZ) | 8 |
| UK Singles (Official Charts) | 87 |
| US Billboard Hot 100 | 12 |
| US Hot R&B/Hip-Hop Songs (Billboard) | 7 |
| US Rhythmic Airplay (Billboard) | 18 |
| US Rolling Stone Top 100 | 18 |

=== Year-end charts ===
| Chart (2020) | Position |
|---|---|
| US Billboard Hot 100 | 90 |
| US Hot R&B/Hip-Hop Songs (Billboard) | 41 |

| Chart (2021) | Position |
|---|---|
| US Hot R&B/Hip-Hop Songs (Billboard) | 100 |

==== Rags2Riches 2 ====
| Chart (2020) | Peak position |
|---|---|
| New Zealand Hot Singles (RMNZ) | 36 |
| US Rolling Stone Top 100 | 22 |

== Certifications ==
| Region | Certification | Certified units/sales |
|---|---|---|
| United States (RIAA) | 5× Platinum | 5,000,000^{‡} |
^{‡} Sales+streaming figures based on certification alone.
