= Boyz Don't Cry (song) =

2023 single by Rod Wave

Single by Rod Wave

from the album Nostalgia
- Released: September 13, 2023
- Genre: Country trap
- Length: 2:46
- Label: Alamo
- Songwriters: Rodarius Green; Bryan Beachley; Eric Todd-Williams
- Producers: BeatsByTrain; EgonBeUp; AyoKxnzo; JLH

Rod Wave singles chronology
"Come See Me" (2023)	"Boyz Don't Cry" (2023)	"Checkmate" (2023)

"Boyz Don't Cry" is a song by American rapper and singer Rod Wave, released on September 13, 2023 as the fourth single from his fifth studio album Nostalgia (2023). It was produced by BeatsbyTrain, EgonBeUp, AyoKxnzo and JLH.

An acoustic version of the song was also released.

== Composition ==
"Boyz Don't Cry" has been described as a country song with guitars and trap drums. It consists of one verse, in which Rod Wave sings about his sadness from a breakup, immoral people on the Internet, his happiness from receiving collect calls from an incarcerated friend, and appreciating what he has gained as a musician. He expresses willingness to trade everything in his life for a peace of mind in the chorus, which ends the song.

== Charts ==
=== Weekly charts ===
Weekly chart performance for "Boyz Don't Cry"
Chart (2023)	Peak position
Global 200 (Billboard)	95
New Zealand Hot Singles (RMNZ)	30
US Billboard Hot 100	25
US Hot R&B/Hip-Hop Songs (Billboard)	10

=== Year-end charts ===
2024 year-end chart performance for "Boyz Don't Cry"
Chart (2024)	Position
US Hot R&B/Hip-Hop Songs (Billboard)	98

== Certifications ==
Region	Certification	Certified units/sales
United States (RIAA)	Gold	500,000^{‡}
^{‡} Sales+streaming figures based on certification alone.
