= Come See Me (Rod Wave song) =

2023 single by Rod Wave

Single by Rod Wave

from the album Nostalgia
- Released: September 1, 2023
- Genre: Trap
- Length: 3:10
- Label: Alamo
- Songwriter: Rodarius Green
- Producers: Gabe Lucas; Desirez

Rod Wave singles chronology
"Call Your Friends" (2023)	"Come See Me" (2023)	"Boyz Don't Cry" (2023)

Music video
- "Come See Me" on YouTube

"Come See Me" is a song written and performed by American rapper and singer Rod Wave, released on September 1, 2023 as the third single from his fifth studio album Nostalgia. It was produced by BeatsbyTrain, Ryan Bevolo, Landers and McCoy.

== Composition ==
The song contains piano chords in the production, in the style of trap. The lyrics deal with Rod Wave struggling with feeling heartbroken and lonely as a result of a failed relationship. Furthermore, he addresses how emotional anguish can lead to suicide.

== Music video ==
An official music video premiered alongside the single. Directed by Brett Arndt, it finds Rod Wave alone in his apartment one evening, rapping and then jumping off a balcony. Before he hits the ground, he wakes up from an apparent nightmare.

== Charts ==
Chart performance for "Come See Me"
Chart (2023)	Peak position
Global 200 (Billboard)	87
New Zealand Hot Singles (RMNZ)	34
US Billboard Hot 100	19
US Hot R&B/Hip-Hop Songs (Billboard)	8

== Certifications ==
Region	Certification	Certified units/sales
United States (RIAA)	Platinum	1,000,000^{‡}
^{‡} Sales+streaming figures based on certification alone.
