= Rod Wave =

American rapper and singer (born 1998)

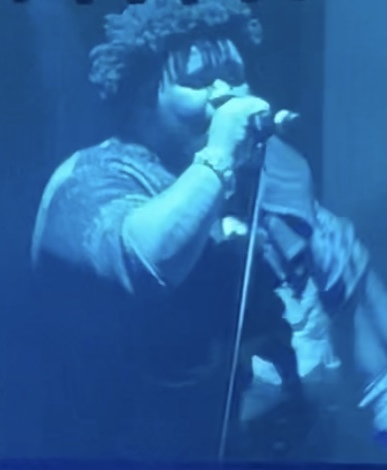
- Rod Wave in 2022

Background information
- Born: Rodarius Marcell Green; August 27, 1998 (age 28); St. Petersburg, Florida, U.S.
- Genres: R&B; soul; trap
- Occupations: Rapper; singer; songwriter
- Works: Rod Wave discography
- Years active: 2016–present
- Labels: Alamo (current); Geffen; Interscope; Hit House (former)
- Children: 2
- Website: official-rodwave.com

Logo
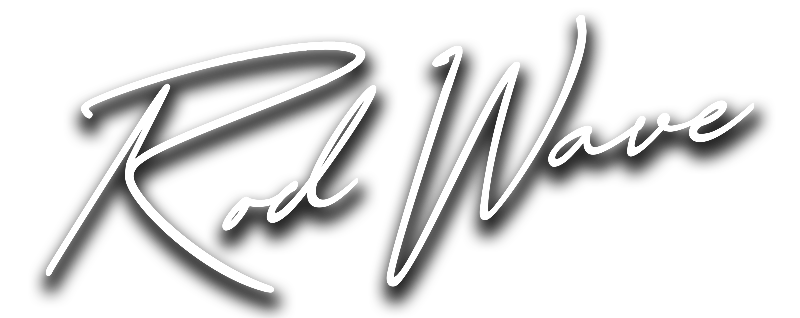

Rodarius Marcell Green (born August 27, 1998), known professionally as Rod Wave, is an American rapper, singer, and songwriter. Signed to Alamo Records, Green is known for his strong voice and incorporation of hip hop and R&B, having been recognized as a pioneer of "trap-soul." Green rose to prominence with his 2019 single "Heart on Ice," which first went viral on TikTok before peaking at number 25 on the Billboard Hot 100. The song preceded his debut studio album, Ghetto Gospel (2019), which peaked at number ten on the US Billboard 200. His second album, Pray 4 Love (2020), peaked at number two on the chart and included the song "Rags2Riches" (remixed featuring Lil Baby), which peaked at number 12 on the Billboard Hot 100.

His third, fourth, and fifth studio albums: SoulFly (2021), Beautiful Mind (2022), and Nostalgia (2023), each debuted atop the Billboard 200 and received double platinum certifications by the Recording Industry Association of America (RIAA). The latter spent multiple weeks at the position, while the former spawned his highest-charting singles, "Street Runner" and "Tombstone"—both of which peaked within the top 20 of the Billboard Hot 100. Along with critical praise for his soulful delivery and lyrics, Green's commercial success matched the numbers of Taylor Swift as the only musical act to release a new chart-topping solo album within each of the previous three years. Green's sixth studio album, Last Lap (2024), debuted at number two on the Billboard 200, marking Green's seventh consecutive top ten album, and making him the only male artist to release a top ten album each year from 2019 to 2024. Green's seventh, Don't Look Down (2026) topped the cart, marking his fourth chart-topper and his eighth consecutive top ten on the chart.

Green has sold 105.5 million digital copies in the United States, ranking him among the highest certified artists in the United States. He has been nominated for a Grammy Award, an American Music Award, a Billboard Music Award, and an iHeartRadio Music Award. He is also the twenty-fourth artist to chart a hundred songs on the Billboard Hot 100. Green's Nostalgia was listed among the top-earning projects released through Sony Music.

== Early life ==
Green attended Lakewood High School.

Rodarius Marcell Green was born on August 27, 1998, in St. Petersburg, Florida. During his elementary school years, Green experienced a challenging family situation when his parents divorced, and his father subsequently ended up in jail. Struggling with financial difficulties, his family found it challenging to provide the necessary support. As a result, Green turned to the streets as a means to make a living. Unfortunately, this led him down a troubled path, involving multiple stints in juvenile centers and engagement in various illicit activities such as drug dealing, robbery, burglary, and possession of firearms. Green attended Lakewood Elementary School in Saint Petersburg, FL, and was selected for All-State Elementary Chorus in 2009 and 2010. He continued to perform in front of his fellow students at Lakewood High School.

Following his father Rodney "Fatz" Green's incarceration, Fatz's close friend, Derek "Uncle Dee" Lane played a major role in his life before he was eventually arrested and sentenced to a year in prison a year after Fatz. Upon his father's release from jail, he recognized the destructive lifestyle his son was entangled in. Determined to steer Wave in a more positive direction, his father took a proactive approach, resulting in Green joining the high school football team. He encouraged Green to channel his energy into music, recognizing its potential to transform his life. In support of this newfound passion, Fatz purchased a microphone, while his brother contributed by buying him a computer. Equipped with these tools, Green was provided with the means to redirect his life towards a more positive and constructive path. After the release of Lane, he and Fatz came together to found the entertainment company and record label, Hit House Entertainment, to support Green before he eventually signed to Alamo Records.

== Career ==
=== 2015–2020: Early mixtapes, Ghetto Gospel, and Pray 4 Love ===
Green's career began in 2015, with the release of Rookie of the Year and his Hunger Games mixtape trilogy, the latter two of the series released under Alamo Records, which Green signed with in 2018. On June 14, 2019, he released his mixtape PTSD, which included the song "Heart on Ice". The song went viral on YouTube and TikTok, peaking at number 25 on the Billboard Hot 100. From July to October 2019, Green appeared as a supporting act on Kevin Gates' I'm Him Tour. During Green's interview with XXL, he spoke about how going on tour with Gates helped him grow as an artist: "When I was on tour with you, it was fun seeing the world, and I learned how big the world was. Being stuck in a bubble and stuck in a market, you feel me, it kinda made me more humbler because it's like it's a whole 'nother side of the world that don't even know who you is".

His debut album, Ghetto Gospel, executively produced by Kevin Gates was released on November 1, 2019. It was preceded by three singles, "Heart on Ice (Remix)" featuring Lil Durk, "Cuban Links" featuring Kevin Gates, and "Close Enough to Hurt". The album peaked at number 10 on the Billboard 200. Following the release of the album, in January 2020, Green announced his twenty-two stop United States Ghetto Gosepl Tour, starting on March 3, 2020, in Augusta, Georgia, and concluding on April 3, in St. Petersburg, Florida, in support of his album.

On April 3, 2020, Green released his second full-length studio album, Pray 4 Love. The album was preceded by six singles, "Dark Clouds", "Thug Motivation", "Thief in the Night", "Pray 4 Love", "The Greatest", and "Girl of My Dreams". The album debuted at number 2 on the Billboard 200. Several songs from the album entered the Billboard Hot 100, including "Rags2Riches" featuring ATR Son Son, which peaked at number 12 on the Hot 100 and became his highest-charting song. On April 6, Rod Wave was selected by music streaming service Audiomack as the first artist in their "Up Now" emerging artist program. "Audiomack has been helping me get my music out there from the very beginning before people really knew who I was," the artist told Audiomack. "Continuing to work together with them is part of staying true to my core fans as I take the next step of the journey". On May 18, it was announced that Green signed a global co-publishing deal with Sony Music Publishing (formerly Sony/ATV publishing). In an interview with Billboard, Green expressed that his decision to sign with Sony stemmed from his goals of writing movie scripts in the future, while also announcing the release of a deluxe edition of Pray 4 Love to release on August 7, while also stating his plan for the release of his third album, to release on the 27th of the same month. The deluxe edition released as planned with additional features from Yo Gotti and Lil Baby. On August 11, 2020, Wave was included on XXL's 2020 Freshman Class.

=== 2021–2022: SoulFly, Beautiful Mind, and Jupiter's Diary: 7 Day Theory ===
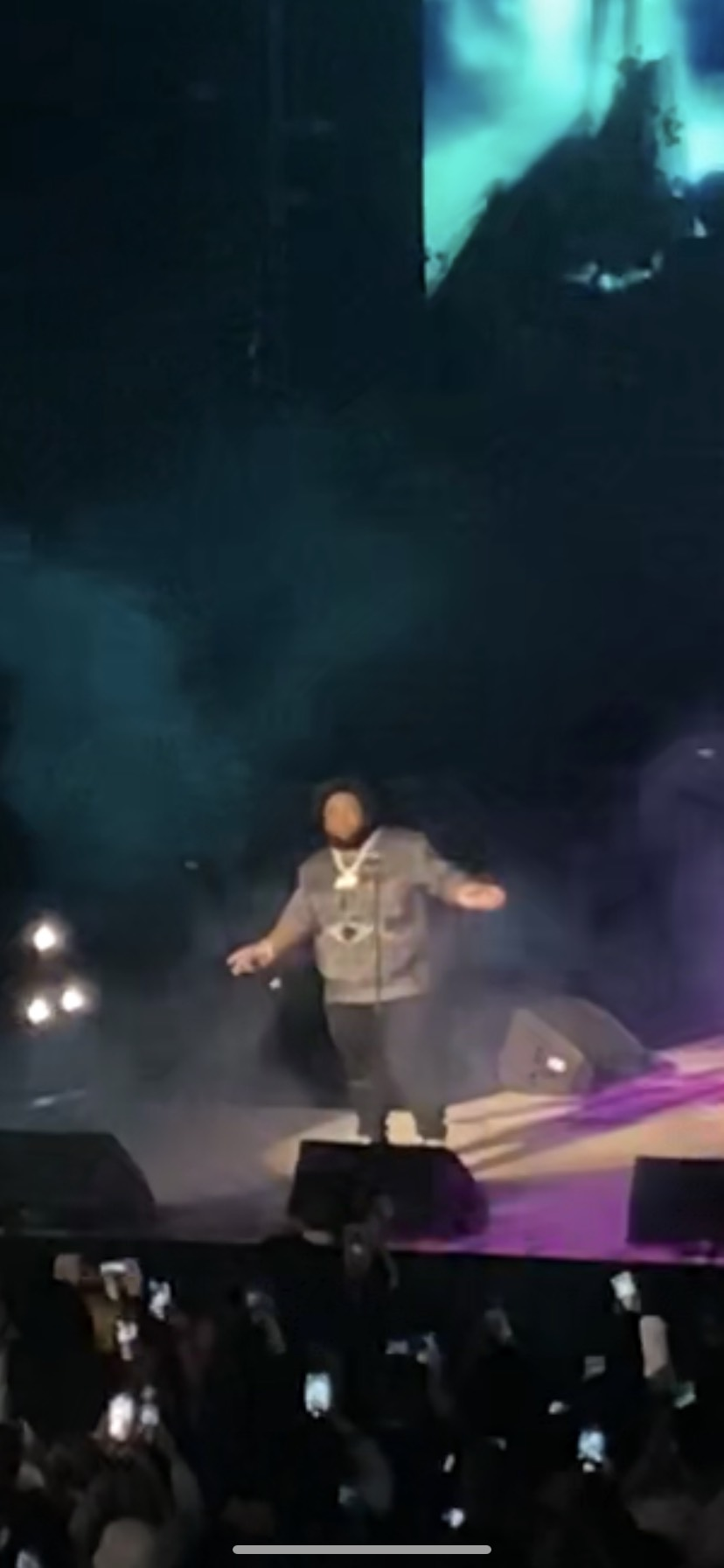
Green performing in Pittsburgh during his Beautiful Mind Tour, 2022.

In January 2021, Green shared the album's cover art on his Instagram while calling out Alamo Records for not paying him, stating that he wouldn't release the album until he'd get paid. He revealed the track list for his album SoulFly on March 6, 2021. The album was released as planned on March 26, 2021, and was preceded by three singles, "Street Runner", "Tombstone", and "Richer" featuring Polo G. While being the most pre-saved album on Apple Music for two weeks, SoulFly debuted atop the Billboard 200, marking Green's first chart-topper, moving 130,000 album-equivalent units in its first week. On April 8, Green performed "Tombstone" on The Tonight Show Starring Jimmy Fallon. In May 2021, it was announced by the NMPA that Rod Wave was the biggest artist-songwriter in Q1 of 2021 with ten certifications, in the US. On August 20, Green released the deluxe edition of SoulFly, featuring guest appearances from Lil Durk and Kodak Black. Following the release of the deluxe, the album returned to the top ten of the Billboard 200 at #3. In support of the album, Green embarked on a thirty-six-stop tour throughout the United States, presented by Rolling Loud and Live Nation as the first tour under the new joint venture. The tour began on August 27, 2021, in Houston, Texas, and concluded on October 23 in Seattle, Washington.

On November 14, Green released the single "By Your Side" as the lead single from his fourth full-length studio album, Beautiful Mind. The single, "Cold December" was released on January 17, 2022. On May 1, Green released "Sorry 4 The Wait", a remix to Future's "Wait for U". Alongside the release of the track, Green announced the release of Beautiful Mind for June 3, 2022. However, the album failed to be released on time, resulting in fans complaining on social media. The single "Stone Rolling" was released on July 27. On August 5, Green appeared as a guest appearance on "Home Ain't Home", the thirteenth cut of YoungBoy Never Broke Again's fourth studio album, The Last Slimeto. "Alone" was released on August 8, just days prior to the release of Beautiful Mind, serving as the album's fourth and final single. On August 10, Green released the album's tracklist, previewing features from Jack Harlow and December Joy. Beautiful Mind was released on August 12, and debuted atop the Billboard 200, moving 115,000 album-equivalent units in its first week. The album marked Green's second consecutive #1 on the chart. Following the release of the album, Green embarked on a twenty-five-stop tour, beginning on November 11, 2022, in Minneapolis, MN, and ending in Seattle, WA on December 21, 2022. The tour saw support from Toosii and Mariah the Scientist.

On November 10, 2022, Rod Wave released "Break My Heart", the lead single for his eight-track EP, Jupiter's Diary: 7 Day Theory. The EP was released the following week, on November 18, 2022. It peaked at #9 on the Billboard 200 albums chart, marking Rod Wave's fourth top ten debut at the time of its release and was the highest charting new release of the week ending December 4, 2022.

=== 2023–2025: Nostalgia and Last Lap ===
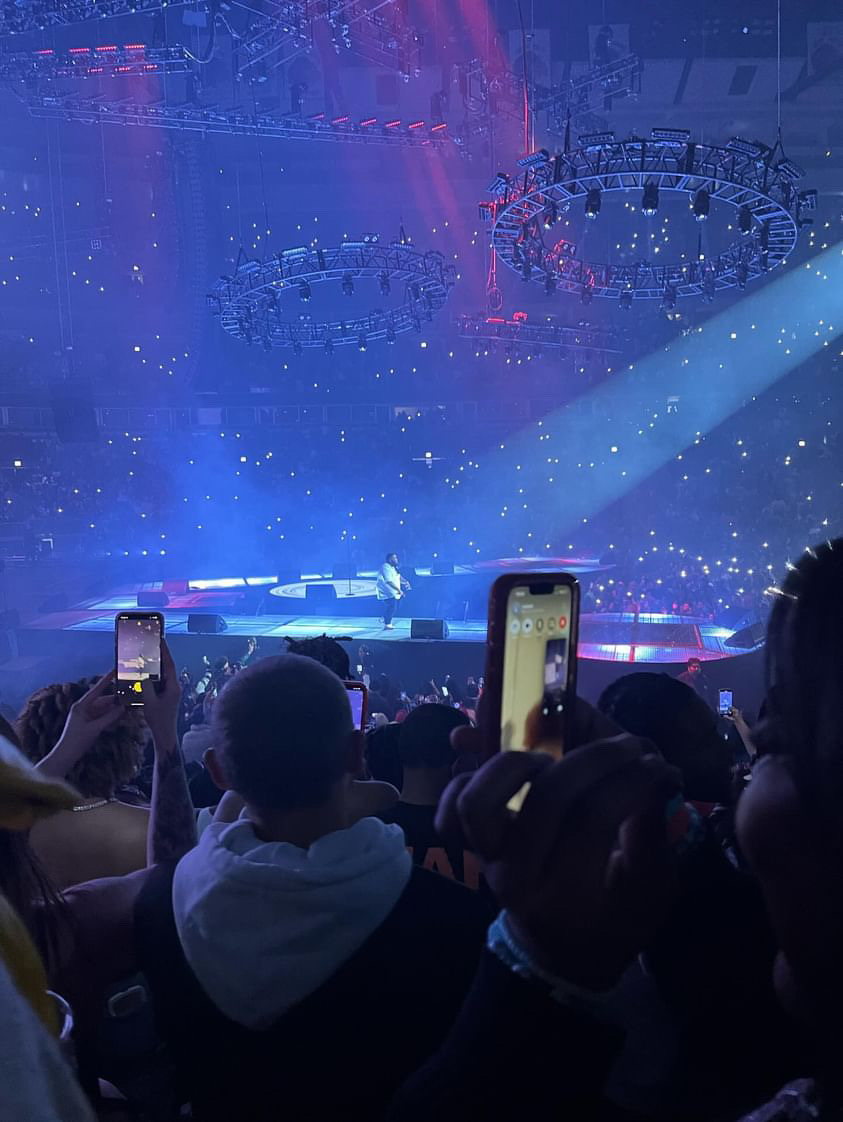
Green performing in Chicago during his Nostalgia Tour, 2023

On March 31, 2023, Rod Wave released "Fight the Feeling" as the lead single for his upcoming studio album. It peaked at #16 on the Billboard Hot 100. Months later, on August 18, 2023, he released the album's second single, "Call Your Friends" which peaked at #18 on the Billboard Hot 100. This was followed by "Come See Me" on September 1, 2023, peaking at #19 on the Billboard Hot 100. On the week of the album's release, Rod Wave released the last two singles of the project, "Boyz Don't Cry" and "Checkmate" on September 13, 2023, and September 14, 2023. The two singles peaked at #25 and #55 on the Billboard Hot 100, respectively. On September 15, 2023, Rod Wave released his fifth full-length studio album, Nostalgia, which featured guest appearances from Wet, 21 Savage, and Sadie Jean. The album debuted at #1 on the Billboard 200 albums chart, moving 137,000 album-equivalent units in its first week, marking Rod Wave's third #1 album. The album remained at #1 on the chart in its second week, moving an additional 88,000 units. Following the release of the album, Green embarked on his Nostalgia Tour, a thirty-five-stop arena tour in the United States. The tour was supported by Ari Lennox, Toosii, G Herbo, and Eelmatic. Following the release of the album, in November 2023, Green was faced with controversy as Baton Rouge, Louisiana rapper, Boosie Badazz accused Green of stealing his lyrics and sampling his music without paying him, stating that he plans to file a lawsuit against Green. Despite Green stating that he'd pay Boosie, the situation escalated and Boosie stated that he was going forward with the lawsuit. On November 10, Green appeared as a guest appearance on "Better Than Ever", the seventh cut of YoungBoy Never Broke Again's twenty-first mixtape, Decided 2, being the only artist to feature on the project.

On September 4, 2024, Rod Wave took to his Instagram to announce his 2024 Last Lap Tour in the United States, supported by Moneybagg Yo, Toosii, Lil Poppa, Dess Dior, and Eelmatic. The thirty-six-stop tour shares the same name as Green's sixth full-length studio album, Last Lap. On September 13, Rod Wave released the album's lead single, "Passport Junkie" which peaked at #51 on the Billboard Hot 100. On September 26, Green announced the release of his sixth full-length studio album, Last Lap to release on October 11. The following day, he released the album's second single, "Fall Fast in Love" which peaked at #49 on the Billboard Hot 100. On October 11, Green released Last Lap as planned featuring guest appearances from Be Charlotte, Lil Baby, Lil Yachty, Rylo Rodriguez, and Wild Rivers. The album debuted at #2 on the Billboard 200, moving 127,000 album-equivalent units in its first week, marking Green's seventh consecutive top-ten album, and making him the only artist other than Taylor Swift to chart a top ten album each year from 2019 to 2024.

In April 2025, Green released "Sinners", the lead single to the soundtrack for the film of the same name. The song's music video stars Woody McClain, Dominique Madison, and Charles A. Black, alongside Michael B. Jordan, the film's lead.

=== 2026–present: Don't Look Down ===
On August 28, 2026, Rod Wave confirmed that his project, Don't Look Down would be releasing on August 28, 2026, it serves as his first major release following Last Lap.

== Artistry ==
=== Influences ===
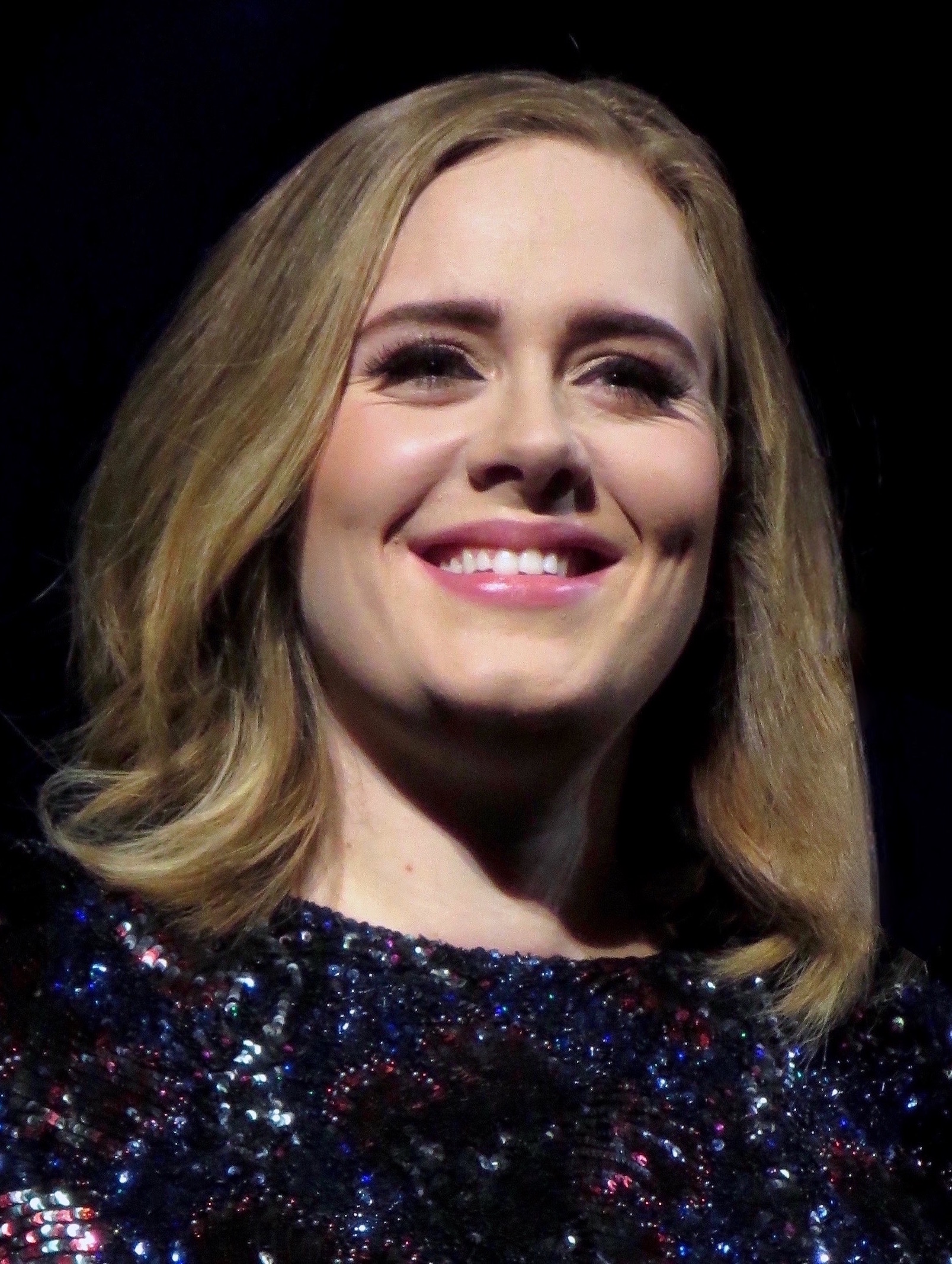
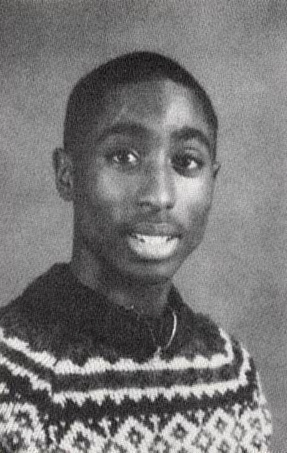
Green has taken inspiration from a variety of artists such as Adele (left) and Tupac Shakur (right).

Green was raised on the sounds of E-40, Chingy, Boosie Badazz, Chief Keef, Kanye West, Kodak Black, and Kevin Gates. In his April 2020 interview with Billboard, leading up to the release of Pray 4 Love, Green cited Tupac Shakur and Adele as two of his inspirations, noting that he can "hear everything she went through". In his 2023 interview with Billboard, following the release of Nostalgia, Green cited Ed Sheeran as one of his favorite artists. In the same interview, it was written that Adele and Ed Sheeran helped Green, "find his voice".

=== Musical style ===
Green has been recognized for his "candor and shrewd ability to tug at listeners' heartstrings". ABC News Radio's Rachel George noted that "music is a direct expression of Wave's life, which is why he's cautious yet open to working with other artists who share his passion". In Green's interview with Ebro Darden on Apple Music, he went into depth behind the reasoning for his subject matter often surrounding pain, describing music as a sort of "therapy" for him:

I feel like when I first came on the scene, I had a lot of pain and just a lot of scars and stuff, and I just feel like, over the years, I done let a lot of it out and it was just therapy for me.

His musical creativity and lyrics derive from his personal life, childhood, and romantic relationships. Green's lyrics have been described as "soul grabbing" and his hooks have been described as "entrancing" by critics. His music seemingly is used to "express his heartbreak and inner turmoil" and he's praised for his ability to "hopscotch among genres" such as hip-hop, contemporary hip-hop, Southern hip hop, hip hop soul, alternative R&B, contemporary R&B, and trap. Green also experiments with Gospel music is songs such as "Long Journey" and "Chip on My Shoulder". Furthermore, he is known widely for his experimentation and implementations of samples in his music, such as "Already Won" sampling "Can You Stand the Rain" by New Edition, "Cold December" sampling "O.D.'d in Denver" by Hank Williams Jr., and "Crazy" sampling "Ain't It Fun" by Paramore, alongside several other tracks throughout his discography.

== Legal issues ==
=== 2014–2016: Armed robbery and probation ===
In 2014, when Green was 15 years old, he was arrested following a break-in on 62nd Avenue S. Green admitted to stealing a .357 revolver from the home and using it to shoot another teen in the foot at Lake Vista Recreation Center. While incarcerated at the juvenile detention center, a counselor informed Green that he suffered from PTSD. Green spent months in and out of juvie and wore an ankle monitor to school. Despite rumors of an attempted murder charge, the case was later dropped after the victim of the shooting called it an "accident".

In January 2017, Green was arrested after carrying a pellet gun to school in his backpack, resulting in the school being put on lockdown. Green pleaded guilty to carrying a concealed firearm and received probation for the misdemeanor.

=== 2022: Domestic violence ===
On May 1, 2022, Green was pulled over "after a traffic infraction occurred", leading to him being arrested by the St. Petersburg Police Department from an out-of-county warrant issued by Osceola County, Florida. Reports surfaced claiming that Green was arrested on domestic violence charges and was facing a felony charge of domestic battery by strangulation, to which Green plead not guilty. Green's lawyer later successfully persuaded the State prosecution to accept a Nolle Pross/No Info agreement which saw the charge dropped after a couple of weeks.

=== 2024: Weapons charges ===
In April 2024, Green was arrested in Manatee County, Florida on two counts of illegally possessing a firearm or ammunition as a convicted felon, with the case being related to a shooting that occurred on Easter Sunday outside the Sonic Sports Bar in St. Petersburg, Florida and saw four people injured. In a press conference, members of the St. Petersburg Police Department claimed that the shooting was gang-related. Three men tied to Wave were arrested on charges related to the shooting as well. According to St. Petersburg Police Chief Mike Kovacsev, the three men tied to Green who were apprehended (Christopher Atkins, Keith Westby, and Kevontre Wesby) are allegedly connected to the Young Gangsters gang, and two additional suspects were in the process of being arrested as well. Though Kovacsev did not accuse Green of being a gang member, he noted that the two residencies where the Young Gangsters gang members were captured were rented by Green and that their getaway vehicle was registered to him as well. However, Green was later released, as it was determined that information provided regarding him being a convicted felon was inaccurate.

=== 2025: Assault, weapons and drug charges and lawsuits ===
On May 20, 2025, Green was arrested in relation to an incident stemming from April 21, 2025, in Fulton County, Georgia. Alongside the arrest, Green was charged with an additional twelve charges, including: aiming a pistol at another person, reckless conduct, criminal damage to property, obstruction of law enforcement, evidence tampering, conspiracy to commit a felony, and simple assault. Upon arrest, Green was released on a $50,000 bond before his lawyer Drew Findling stated that "there is no truth to these charges" and that Green was a victim of a burglary, resulting in his charges.

On September 29, Grizzly Touring filed a federal lawsuit against Green for a breach of contract, regarding his Last Lap Tour. The touring company alleges that Green refused to pay back $27 million worth of advances after performing 26 out of 35 scheduled shows. Reports state that Green was given an advance of $57 million for the tour; the 26 shows paid for the $30 million earned, however, Grizzly Touring is suing for the remaining $27 million alongside additional damages. The company also filed an injunction after Green founded his own touring company—Mainstay Touring, in 2025—stating that Green should not be allowed to tour without Grizzly Touring as it is a breach of the exclusivity clause in his contract with Grizzly. Green's attorney responded to the claims, stating that the cancellations of several dates of the tour were solely attributed to Grizzly Touring's professional shortcomings.

On November 7, Green was arrested in Atlanta, Georgia, after being charged with possession of a firearm or knife during the commission of or attempt to commit a felony, reckless driving, and two counts of possession of a controlled substance and booked into Fulton County Jail. On November 8, he was released on $8,000 bail.

On December 11, Tampa-based photographer Allan Salas filed a lawsuit against Green regarding a copyright claim for the cover art of his sixth studio album, Last Lap (2024). Salas claimed that the image used for the cover art was unapproved by him and that he was never paid for the use, nor was the image licensed, while stating that Green and his team explicitly ignored warnings that the photo's license was under Salas's rights.

== Personal life ==
Green has twin daughters with his long-time on-and-off girlfriend, Kelsey "Dee" Coleman.

== Filmography ==
- Don't Look Down: The Turtle Race Continues (2025; as himself)

== Discography ==
- Ghetto Gospel (2019)
- Pray 4 Love (2020)
- SoulFly (2021)
- Beautiful Mind (2022)
- Nostalgia (2023)
- Last Lap (2024)
- Don't Look Down (2026)

== Tours ==
=== Headlining ===
- Ghetto Gospel Tour (2020)
- SoulFly Tour (2021)
- Beautiful Mind Tour (2022)
- Nostalgia Tour (2023)
- Last Lap Tour (2024)
- The Redemption Experience (2025–26)
- Don't Look Down Tour (2026)

=== Supporting ===
- I'm Him Tour (Kevin Gates) (2019)

== Awards and nominations ==
Year	Organization	Work	Award	Result
2021	American Music Awards	SoulFly	Favorite Rap/Hip Hop Album	Nominated
2021	Billboard Music Awards	Himself	Top New Artist	Nominated
2021	iHeartRadio Music Awards	Himself	Best New Hip-Hop Artist	Nominated
2026	Grammy Awards	"Sinners"	Best Song Written for Visual Media	Nominated

== See also ==
- List of highest-certified music artists in the United States
