= Alamo Records =

American record label

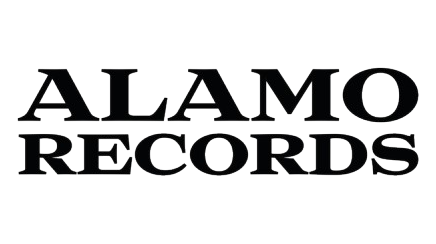
- Parent company: Sony Music Entertainment (2021–present); Universal Music Group (2016–2021)
- Founded: November 10, 2016; 9 years ago
- Founder: Todd Moscowitz
- Distributors: Sony (2021–present); Interscope Geffen A&M (2016–2021); EMPIRE (2017–2019); Foundation Media (2019–2021)
- Genre: Various
- Country of origin: United States
- Location: New York City, New York
- Official website: alamo-records.com

Alamo Records (formerly Cold Heat Records) is an American record label founded in 2016 by music executive Todd Moscowitz. Based in New York City, the label began as a joint venture with Universal Music Group and later became part of Sony Music, which acquired a majority stake in 2021.

The label has focused largely on hip-hop and contemporary pop artists and has developed commercially successful acts including Rod Wave and Lil Durk.

== History ==
=== Founding as Cold Heat Records (2016–2017) ===
Following Moscowitz’s departure from 300 Entertainment, Moscowitz founded Cold Heat Records in 2016 as a joint venture with Universal Music Group and Interscope Records.

The label was later renamed Alamo Records as it expanded its roster and branding strategy.

=== Roster growth and streaming-era success (2018–2020) ===
During the late 2010s the label expanded its roster and gained commercial traction through streaming platforms and digital distribution. Artists associated with the label during this period included Lil Durk, Rod Wave, Smokepurpp, and Comethazine.

Several releases from the label’s roster achieved significant commercial success on the Billboard 200 and major streaming platforms, helping establish Alamo as an emerging hip-hop label during the streaming era.

=== Sony acquisition and expansion (2021–present) ===
In June 2021, Sony Music Entertainment acquired a majority stake in Alamo from Universal Music Group.

In 2022, reports indicated that Sony paid approximately $125 million for Universal's interest in the company, consolidating ownership within Sony Music.

By the mid-2020s Alamo had emerged as a significant frontline label within Sony’s recorded music operations, driven in part by the commercial success of artists including Rod Wave and Lil Durk.

In 2025, Billboard named Alamo its R&B/Hip-Hop Power Players Label of the Year.

== Current artists ==
Artists	Year signed	Albums	Notes
Blackbear	2017	6	With Columbia, formerly with Interscope and Beartrap
03 Greedo	2017	7	
Smokepurpp	2017	6	Formerly with Interscope and Geffen
Rod Wave	2018	10	Formerly with Interscope and Geffen
Lil Durk	2018	11	Formerly with Interscope and Geffen
Comethazine	2018	7	Formerly with Interscope and Geffen
Trevor Daniel	2018	11	With RCA, formerly with Interscope and Internet Money
DD Osama	2022	1	
BossMan Dlow	2023	2	
Chenayder	2023	2	
