= 2021 in hip-hop =

This article summarizes the events, album releases, and album release dates in hip-hop for the year 2021.

== Events ==
=== January ===
- On January 1, Swae Lee and Mike Will Made It were involved in a severe car accident. They both survived.
- On January 5, Dr. Dre was admitted to the hospital after suffering a brain aneurysm. He later recovered.
- On January 7, DaBaby was arrested for gun possession in Beverly Hills, California.
- On January 12, YFN Lucci was on the run for murder in Atlanta, Georgia. He later turned himself in to the authorities. Then he was later released on $500,000 bond.
- On January 13, Chicago rapper Rico Recklezz was sentenced to prison for three years on gun possession charges.
- On January 15, Denzel Curry and Smino found out that they were related due to a shared uncle.
- On January 19, Lil Wayne and Kodak Black were both pardoned by President Donald Trump on his last full day in office. The same day, Memphis-rapper Big CEO was shot and killed by his own gang, he was 21 years old.
- On January 20, 9lokkNine was arrested for multiple counts of attempted second-degree murder.
- On January 26, Georgia-based rapper 6 Dogs died from an apparent suicide.
- On January 30, Double K of People Under the Stairs died from unspecified causes.

=== February ===
- On February 1, Silentó was arrested for the murder of his cousin in DeKalb County, Georgia.
- On February 2, Chief Keef was hospitalized.
- On February 12, Nicki Minaj's father Robert Maraj was killed by a hit-and-run driver.
- On February 13, Yella Beezy was arrested for a gun charge in Dallas, Texas.
- On February 18, Prince Markie Dee of The Fat Boys died.
- On February 21, a shooting occurred at Roddy Ricch and 42 Dugg's music video shoot, which left three people injured in Atlanta, Georgia. OMB Peezy was later charged in connection with the shooting with aggravated assault with a deadly weapon and possession of a firearm during the commission of a crime.
- On February 22, Kim Kardashian filed for divorce from Kanye West. She cited irreconcilable differences as the reason for their divorce.
- On February 23, Bobby Shmurda was released after serving almost 7 years in prison.

=== March ===
- On March 4, Square bought Jay-Z's streaming service Tidal.
- On March 6/7, Florida-based rapper and Kodak Black associate, Jackboy, was arrested for illegal gun possession.
- On March 13, Megan Thee Stallion won the Best New Artist award at the 63rd Annual Grammy Awards. She also won Best Rap Performance and Best Rap Song with her song, "Savage (Remix)", featuring Beyoncé on the remix. Anderson .Paak won Best Melodic Rap Performance for "Lockdown" and Nas won his first Grammy with King's Disease.
- On March 15, Rich the Kid was arrested for gun possession at LAX.
- On March 18, Famous Dex was arrested in Los Angeles, California, for carrying a concealed firearm.
- On March 19, Saweetie announced on Twitter she broke with up fellow rapper Quavo and accused him of cheating on her.
- On March 22, YoungBoy Never Broke Again was arrested from fleeing the police in Los Angeles, California.
- On March 29, NLE Choppa was arrested for burglary, weapon charges, and drug charges in Davie, Florida. That same day, Lil Nas X gets sued by Nike, Inc. for controversy over the Satan Shoes, tied to release of his single, "Montero (Call Me by Your Name)" and the song's music video (which features similar imagery as the shoes and also caused controversy).

=== April ===
- On April 2, DMX suffered a heart attack and was rushed to the hospital in critical condition.
- On April 5, Kodak Black and his security and entourage were shot at in Tallahassee, Florida, after an altercation with record producer Southside.
- On April 9, DMX's family confirmed his death exactly a week after he was rushed to the hospital. It was revealed on July 8 by the Westchester County Medical Examiner's Office that his official cause of death was a cocaine-induced heart attack.
- On April 14, Rich the Kid signed a multi-million dollar deal with Rostrum Records.
- On April 17, Black Rob, a former Bad Boy recording artist, died from kidney failure.
- On April 22, Shock G of Digital Underground died at 57.
- On April 23, Lil Mosey was charged with second-degree rape. The same day, Kehlani came out as lesbian.
- On April 24/25, DMX's celebration of life and funeral took place at Barclays Center, featuring tributes, testimonies, memorials and a performance from Kanye West's Sunday Service Choir.
- On April 28, Kodak Black pled guilty in South Carolina to assault and received 18 months of probation.
- Eminem’s home was invaded when the robber threatened to kill him

=== May ===
- On May 2, Quando Rondo and his crew were involved in a nighttime shooting.
- On May 3, NLE Choppa and his crew were involved in a fight in Santa Monica, California.
- On May 15, Lil Reese was shot in a stolen vehicle in Chicago, Illinois.
- On May 16, pioneering hip hop artist Captain Rock (associated with Dr. Jeckyll & Mr. Hyde) died. The cause was not announced. That same day, Brazilian rapper MC Kevin falls to his death.
- On May 18, a Houston crip revealed that MO3 killed 2 men before his death. On that same day, St. Louis rapper Remy4x was shot and killed in Syracuse, New York.
- On May 29, Lil Reese was arrested for assault. He was later released on a $10,000 bond.
- On May 30, a music video in Huntsville, Alabama, featuring Boosie Badazz ended up in gunfire leaving 1 dead.
- On May 31, Lil Loaded committed suicide at the age of 20. That same day, an associate and protégé of DaBaby, Wisdom, was arrested for attempted murder.

=== June ===
- On June 1, Yo Gotti announced that his label Collective Music Group had signed to Interscope Records.
- On June 3, Dae Dae was announced wanted for stabbing a Dunkin' Donuts employee in December 2020.
- On June 6, Lil Durk's brother OTF Dthang was shot and killed outside a nightclub in Harvey, Illinois.
- On June 7, Snoop Dogg became the executive creative and strategic consultant of Def Jam Recordings.
- On June 8, Pooh Shiesty turned himself in after a strip club shooting, eventually getting charged for aggravated battery.
- On June 12, Ash Riser was found dead.
- On June 12, Polo G was arrested in Miami, Florida, following an incident with the police. According to jail records, he faced five charges including battery on a police officer, threatening a public servant, resisting an officer with violence, resisting an officer without violence and criminal mischief. His brother was also arrested. Later at the end of the weekend, his mother bailed him and his brother out on bond.
- On June 16, XXL released their 2021 Freshman Class, including 42 Dugg, Morray, Toosii, Blxst, Iann Dior, Coi Leray, Flo Milli, Rubi Rose, Pooh Shiesty, DDG, and Lakeyah.
- On June 21, 34 people including rappers 9lokkNine and Hotboii were arrested on charges including racketeering and conspiracy to commit racketeering.
- On June 24, the daughter of Fetty Wap died of a health condition she suffered since birth.

=== July ===
- On July 2, Lil Uzi Vert and Saint Jhn allegedly got into a confrontation after Saint Jhn was spotted by Lil Uzi Vert with his ex-girlfriend Brittany Byrd. The confrontation led to a physical altercation between the two which resulted in Lil Uzi Vert flashing a gun at the two, then holding the gun to his ex-girlfriend's stomach. It was reported that no one was harmed and everybody left the scene.
- On July 4, Meek Mill and Travis Scott allegedly got into a verbal altercation for unknown reasons, at a 4th of July party.
- On July 6, Gunna was hospitalized due to possible pneumonia. That same day, XXL reported that Lil Uzi Vert allegedly hospitalized his ex-girlfriend by punching her in the face multiple times, soon after an incident when she was spotted with rapper Saint Jhn. Woods and his team did not respond to the claims made by Brittany.
- On July 7, Lil Baby was arrested on a drug charge and James Harden was stopped by the police in Paris, France, after going to Paris Fashion Week alongside names like Kanye West. They were soon released.
- On July 12, Yung Mal and 5 others were arrested for murder at a deadly gas station shooting.
- On July 15, Lil Durk was targeted in a home invasion where he and his girlfriend exchanged gunfire with the suspects. Nobody was harmed and the suspects fled the scene.
- On July 16, SpotemGottem was arrested for aggravated assault with a firearm. That same day, Biz Markie died due to complications with diabetes.
- On July 18, Sheff G was arrested for gun possession.
- On July 22, Fredo Bang was reportedly arrested in Miami, Florida, along with his friend and fellow rapper, Lit Yoshi, for opening fire on a vehicle with some of YoungBoy Never Broke Again's crew, and reportedly striking a man in the process.
- On July 23, Florida rapper Money Mitch reportedly died by suicide, following a shootout with police officers in Palm Beach County, Florida. He was affiliated with fellow rappers like Lil Baby.
- On July 25, DaBaby faced backlash for rant that was described as homophobic during his performance at Rolling Loud in Miami, Florida. He also responded to criticism in a response video which was also controversial. He received criticism from music icons like Madonna and Elton John as well as Dua Lipa, who he collaborated with on the international hit single, "Levitating". His version of the song was removed from places like Apple Music playlists and certain radio stations due to his comments; being replaced with a version of the song with Dua Lipa only. DaBaby was dropped from a variety of festivals during this time including iHeartRadio Music Festival and Lollapalooza.
- On July 30, Gonzoe, who was friends with Tupac Shakur and Ice Cube and a member of rap group Kausion, was shot and killed in a shooting at Seattle, Washington.
- On July 31, Edai was shot and killed in Chicago, Illinois.

=== August ===
- On August 4, T.I. was arrested and held in Amsterdam, Netherlands, due to the bicycle that he was riding with colliding with a police vehicle and knocking off its wing mirror.
- On August 9, producer Chucky Thompson died at the age of 53 due to COVID-19 complications. He worked for artists such as The Notorious B.I.G., Nas and Sean Combs & Bad Boy Records.
- On August 15, a close friend to Polo G, BMoney1300, was shot and killed in Chicago, Illinois. On that same day, Memphis-based rapper YNC Capo was shot and killed in a carjacking in Frayser, Tennessee

- On August 30, it was announced that SpotemGottem was wanted in connection to a Dallas, Texas, murder.

=== September ===
- On September 7, Trippie Redd's tour bus was shot at, following a concert in Baltimore, Maryland.
- On September 16, SpotemGottem was shot and wounded in Miami, Florida. He is said to be stable and recovering.
- On September 24, 21 Savage turned himself in after his February 2019 ICE arrest. That same day, YoungBoy Never Broke Again announced he will be featured in an upcoming animated series Crook County created by animator LookImHD which will be released on WorldStarHipHop. The announcement came shortly after the release of his third studio album Sincerely, Kentrell.
- On September 29, it was announced Dr. Dre, Eminem, Mary J. Blige, Kendrick Lamar and Snoop Dogg would perform at next year's Super Bowl LVI Halftime Show.

=== October ===
- On October 7, Kodak Black tweeted a series of suicidal comments, and disabled all his social media accounts.
- On October 12, Tyga was arrested on felony domestic violence charges, after an altercation with his ex-girlfriend, Camaryn Swanson.
- On October 13, OTF Boona was arrested in connection with a shooting in Atlanta, Georgia.
- On October 14, it was reported that R&B singer Emani22, a well-known collaborator of Trippie Redd, died in a car accident at the age of 22 (She died on October 11). The same day, producer D. Hill (known for producing Future's best performing hit as lead artist, "Life Is Good", featuring Drake) also died at the age of 25. The cause of his cause of his death is unknown.
- On October 23, Boosie Badazz told Lil Nas X to kill himself in a homophobic rant on social media.
- On October 26, YoungBoy Never Broke Again was released from jail in Louisiana.
- On October 27, Benny the Butcher was hospitalized for an asthma-related issue.
- On October 29, Fetty Wap was arrested at the New York Rolling Loud festival, on drug-related charges. He was released on a $500,000 bond on November 5, 2021.

=== November ===
- On November 5, a crowd crush took place at Travis Scott's Astroworld Festival, in which eight people died in a stampede from compression in the audience, which caused people to panic and pass out. Additionally, 25 people were hospitalized, and more than 300 people were treated for injuries. On November 10 and 14, two more people died from injuries, bringing the death toll to ten.
- On November 12, Yella Beezy was arrested for sexual assault, abandoned endangered child and weapon charges in Dallas, Texas. The same day, DaBaby called police on ex-girlfriend and mother to his child DaniLeigh.
- On November 16, Drake and Kanye West ended their three-year feud with the help of Larry Hoover and J. Prince.
- On November 17, Young Dolph was fatally shot in Memphis, Tennessee.
- On November 28, Virgil Abloh died from cancer. Abloh was in charge of Louis Vuitton's menswear section and started fashion brand Off-White. He was involved in hip hop culture and notably designed several hip-hop adjacent album covers, including Watch the Throne, 808s & Heartbreak, Luv Is Rage 2, and Pray for Paris.
- On November 30, Rihanna was declared a national hero by the nation of Barbados. After appearing in Barbados to celebrate this award, rumors arose that Rihanna was pregnant with A$AP Rocky's child. On the same day, a Louis Vuitton show was held in Miami, as a tribute to Virgil Abloh.

=== December ===
- On December 1, 50 Cent and French Montana ended their beef. That same day, Chicago rapper Montana of 300 tweeted he is fighting for his life after contracting COVID-19 and pneumonia.
- On December 8, rapper and YG associate, Slim 400, was fatally shot.
- On December 12, Travis Scott was removed from the 2022 Coachella lineup due to his Astroworld Festival controversy.
- On December 16, Florida rapper 9lokkNine was sentenced to over 7 years in prison for attempted murder and racketeering charges.
- On December 18, Kangol Kid died at the age of 55 from his battle with colon cancer. The same day, Drakeo the Ruler was stabbed at a concert and died the next day after being in critical condition.
- On December 21, Westside Gunn was hospitalized after an emergency health scare.
- On December 23, Kay Flock was arrested on murder charges after being accused of fatally shooting 24-year-old Oscar Hernandez.
- On December 31, Chicago rapper Lil Devin died in a home invasion where he was shot and killed in South Side, he was 25 years old

== Released albums ==
=== January ===
Day	Artist(s)	Album	Record label(s)	Entering chart position
1	Bun B and Le$	Distant	DIOS, II Trill Enterprises	
1	DJ Daddykat and Wiz Khalifa	#Fucc2020	Taylor Gang Entertainment	
1	Uncle Murda	Don't Come Outside Vol. 3	ATM WorldWide, Inc., Empire Distribution	
2	Agallah Don Bishop	2021	Propain Campain	
8	Griselda and Black Soprano Family	Conflicted (Original Motion Picture Soundtrack)	Griselda Records	
8	Smoke DZA, Nym Lo, Jayy Grams, 183rd, and OT the Real	R.F.C (Money Is the Motive), Pt. 1	RFC Music Group	
14	2nd Generation Wu (iNTeLL, Pxwer, Sun God, and Young Dirty Bastard)	Hereditary	Dock Street Records	
15	Marco Polo	MP on the MP: The Beat Tape, Vol. 1	Spaghetti Bender	
15	Nyck Caution	Anywhere But Here	Pro Era	
18	CJ Fly	The Way I H(ear) It, Vol. 1	Self-released	
21	Upchurch	Hideas: The Album	Stonebaby Sounds	
22	BRS Kash	Kash Only	LVRN, Interscope Records, A Team Litty	Debuted at No. 98 on the Billboard 200
22	Erick the Architect	Future Proof	Self-released	
22	Lil Skies	Unbothered	All We Got Entertainment, Atlantic Records	Debuted at No. 50 on the Billboard 200
22	Doctor Destruction	Planetory Destruction	Self-released	
22	Peewee Longway and Cassius Jay	Longway Sinatra 2	MPA BandCamp	
22	Th1rt3en (Pharoahe Monch, Marcus Machado, and Daru Jones)	A Magnificent Day for an Exorcism	Fat Beats	
22	Young Dolph	Rich $lave (Deluxe)	Paper Route Empire	
28	Rich the Kid	Lucky 7	Rich Forever Music, Empire	
28	The Alchemist (in collaboration with Born x Raised)	Carry the Fire	Born x Raised, ALC Records	
29	Fredo	Money Can't Buy Happiness	Since 93	Debuted at No. 2 on the UK Albums Chart
29	Lil Durk	The Voice (Deluxe)	Only the Family, Alamo Records, Geffen Records	
29	Madlib	Sound Ancestors	Madlib Invazion	Debuted at No. 153 on the Billboard 200
29	Tha God Fahim and Your Old Droog	Tha Wolf on Wall St.	Mongoloid Banks, TGF Music	
31	Papoose	January	Honorable Records, Worldstar Distro	

=== February ===
Day	Artist(s)	Album	Record label(s)	Entering chart position
2	Yukmouth and California Brougham	Money Rich Regime	Money Rich Ent.	
5	Big Ghost LTD and Conway the Machine	If It Bleeds It Can Be Killed	Griselda, Big Ghost LTD Music	
5	Devin the Dude	Soulful Distance	Coughee Brothaz Enterprises, Empire Distribution	
5	Pooh Shiesty	Shiesty Season	Atlantic Records	Debuted at No. 4 on the Billboard 200
5	Slaine	The Things We Can't Forgive	AR Classic Publishing	
12	JPEGMAFIA	EP2!	Republic	
12	slowthai	Tyron	Method Records	Debuted at No. 1 on the UK Albums Chart
12	Smokepurpp	Psycho (Legally Insane)	Alamo	
12	Various artists	Judas and the Black Messiah: The Inspired Album	RCA	Debuted at No. 12 on the Billboard 200
15	Nova Rockafeller	Scared of Heights	Broadwalk Records	
17	Insane Clown Posse	Yum Yum's Lure	Psychopathic Records	
18	Cassidy	Da Wiseman	Mayhem Music	
19	Bodega Bamz	El Camino	100 Keep It	
19	CJ	Loyalty Over Royalty	Warner Records	Debuted at No. 56 on the Billboard 200
19	Ghetts	Conflict of Interest	Warner Records	Debuted at No. 2 on the UK Albums Chart
19	Jim Jones and Harry Fraud	The Fraud Department	Empire	
19	Kevin Gates	Only the Generals, Pt. II	Bread Winners Association, Atlantic Records	Debuted at No. 18 on the Billboard 200
19	Nef the Pharaoh	SINsational	KILFMB	
19	Trippie Redd	Neon Shark vs Pegasus	1400 Entertainment, TwentyThousand Projects	
19	Yelawolf and Caskey	Yelawolf Blacksheep	Slumerican	
19	Young Buck	Vaccine	Cashville Records	
19	Z-Ro and Mike D	2 the Hardway	One Deep Entertainment, Straight Profit 2K	
19	Your Old Droog and Tha God Fahim	Tha YOD Fahim	Mongoloid Banks	
26	Ben Kenobe	The Empire Strikes Back	made by GOD	
26	Bitter Belief	The Elephant Gifts	Warner Music Group, The Ayems	
26	Casey Veggies	CG5	Commission Records	
26	Curren$y	Collection Agency	Jet Life Recordings	
26	Digga D	Made in the Pyrex	CGM Records	Debuted at No. 3 on the UK Albums Chart
26	Payroll Giovanni and Cardo	Another Day Another Dollar	BYLUG Entertainment	
26	Shordie Shordie and Murda Beatz	Memory Lane	Warner	
26	Trae tha Truth and Mysonne	If You're Scared Stay Inside	Worldstar Distribution	
26	Young Buck	Back on My Buck Shit, Vol. 3	Cashville Records, Drum Squad	
28	Papoose	February	Honorable Records	

=== March ===
Day	Artist(s)	Album	Record label(s)	Entering chart position
5	Agallah Don Bishop	Francisco Blanco	Propain Campain	
5	Denzel Curry and Kenny Beats	Unlocked 1.5	PH Recordings, Loma Vista Recordings	
5	Drake	Scary Hours 2	OVO Sound, Republic Records	
5	Genesis Owusu	Smiling with No Teeth	Ourness	Debuted at No. 27 on the ARIA Charts
5	Jme, Frisco, Shorty, and Capo Lee	Norf Face	Norf Face	
5	Only the Family	Loyal Bros	Only the Family, Empire Distribution	Debuted at No. 12 on the Billboard 200
5	Tek	Pricele$$	D4D Records	
5	Termanology and Shortfyuz	Goya 3	Brick Records	
5	Tory Lanez	Playboy	One Umbrella Records	Debuted at No. 76 on the Billboard 200
5	YBN Almighty Jay	Battling My Spirit	Atlantic Records	
9	Upchurch	Mud to Gold	Redneck Nation Records	Debuted at No. 174 on the Billboard 200
12	Central Cee	Wild West	Central Cee	Debuted at No. 2 on the UK Albums Chart
12	Clever	Crazy	Grade A Productions, Interscope Records, Posty Co., Republic	
16	454	4 Real	Math / Honeymoon	
19	Benny the Butcher and Harry Fraud	The Plugs I Met 2	Black Soprano Family	Debuted at No. 33 on the Billboard 200
19	DDG and OG Parker	Die 4 Respect	DDG Music, Epic Records	Debuted at No. 61 on the Billboard 200
19	Fiend	T.G.I.F. (Thank God It's Fiend)	Jet Life Recordings	
19	Guapdad 4000 and Illmind	1176	Paradise Rising	
19	¡Mayday!	Minute to Midnight	Strange Music, INgrooves Music Group	
19	Kota the Friend and Statik Selektah	To Kill a Sunrise	FLTBYS	
19	OFB	Drill Commandments	Rattrap Entertainment	Debuted at No. 53 on the UK Albums Chart
19	Tokyo Jetz	Cancel Culture	Grand Hustle, Empire	
19	Trap Manny	In Trap We Trust	Highbridge, Atlantic	
26	24kGoldn	El Dorado	Columbia Records	Debuted at No. 22 on the Billboard 200
26	Armand Hammer and The Alchemist	Haram	ALC Records, Backwoodz Studioz	
26	D2x	The Color Blue	Self-released	
26	NF	Clouds (The Mixtape)	NF Real Music, Caroline Records	Debuted at No. 3 on the Billboard 200
26	Ocean Wisdom	Stay Sane	Beyond Measure Records	
26	Rod Wave	SoulFly	Alamo Records	Debuted at No. 1 on the Billboard 200
26	YBN Nahmir	Visionland	Atlantic	
26	Young Dolph and Key Glock	Dum and Dummer 2	Paper Route Empire	Debuted at No. 8 on the Billboard 200
31	Papoose	March	Honorable Records	

=== April ===
Day	Artist(s)	Album	Record label(s)	Entering chart position
2	Jasiah	War	Atlantic Records	
2	Lil Tjay	Destined 2 Win	Columbia Records	Debuted at No. 5 on the Billboard 200
9	Brockhampton	Roadrunner: New Light, New Machine	Question Everything, Inc., RCA Records	Debuted at No. 11 on the Billboard 200
9	Kid Ink	Alive	Tha Alumni	
9	MO3	Shottaz 4Eva	Empire Distribution	Debuted at No. 36 on the Billboard 200
9	Yelawolf and Riff Raff	Turquoise Tornado	Million Dollar Mullet Music, Slumerican	
16	AJ Tracey	Flu Game	Revenge Records	Debuted at No. 2 on the UK Albums Chart
16	Big Scarr	Big Grim Reaper	Atlantic, 1017 Records	Debuted at No. 25 on the Billboard 200
16	Conway the Machine	La Maquina	Griselda Records, Empire Distribution	
16	iLoveMakonnen	My Parade	Timeless Magic, Cor Tan	
16	Kenny Mason	Angelic Hoodrat: Supercut	Self-released	
16	Saweetie	Pretty Summer Playlist: Season 1	ICY, Warner Records	
16	Yelawolf and DJ Paul	Slumafia	Slumerican	
16	Young Stoner Life, Young Thug, and Gunna	Slime Language 2	300 Entertainment, YSL Records	Debuted at No. 1 on the Billboard 200
16	Talib Kweli and Diamond D	Gotham	Javotti Media	
20	Curren$y	Financial District	Self-released	
20	Khrysis	The Hour of Khrysis	Jamla Records, Empire Distribution	
20	Snoop Dogg	From tha Streets 2 tha Suites	Doggystyle Records, Empire Distribution	
22	Cordae	Just Until...	Atlantic	
23	Vinnie Paz	Burn Everything That Bears Your Name	Iron Tusk	
23	Slim Thug	SDS Vibes	Hogg Life	
23	Lil Yachty	Michigan Boy Boat	Quality Control Music, Capitol Records, Motown Records	Debuted at No. 39 on the Billboard 200
23	Moneybagg Yo	A Gangsta's Pain	Collective Music Group, Roc Nation, Bread Gang Entertainment, N-Less Entertainment, Interscope	Debuted at No. 1 on the Billboard 200
23	Yelawolf and DJ Muggs	Mile Zero	Slumerican, Soul Assassins	
28	Morray	Street Sermons	Pick Six	Debuted at No. 41 on the Billboard 200
30	The Alchemist	This Thing of Ours	ALC Records	
30	DJ Khaled	Khaled Khaled	We The Best Music, Epic Records, Roc Nation	Debuted at No. 1 on the Billboard 200
30	Shelley FKA DRAM	Shelley FKA DRAM	Empire Distribution, Atlantic	
30	Yelawolf	Mud Mouth	Slumerican	
30	Locksmith	The Lock Sessions, Vol. 2	Landmark Entertainment	
30	Papoose	April	Honorable Records	

=== May ===
Day	Artist(s)	Album	Record label(s)	Entering chart position
7	Cochise	Benbow Crescent	Columbia Records	
7	Czarface and MF Doom	Super What?	Silver Age	
7	Lil Poppa	Blessed, I Guess	Rule #1, Interscope Records	Debuted at No. 160 on the Billboard 200
7	Night Lovell	Just Say You Don't Care	G*59 Records	
7	Quando Rondo	Still Taking Risks	Never Broke Again, Atlantic Records	Debuted at No. 101 on the Billboard 200
7	Tee Grizzley	Built for Whatever	300 Entertainment, Atlantic	Debuted at No. 15 on the Billboard 200
7	Toosii	Thank You for Believing	South Coast Music Group, Capitol Records	Debuted at No. 25 on the Billboard 200
7	Havoc and Nyce da Future	Future of the Streets	H Class Entertainment	
14	Rello Dreamer and Twista	News @ 9	Creative Minds N Goals, GMG Entertainment	
14	21 Savage and Slaughter Gang	Spiral: From the Book of Saw Soundtrack	Slaughter Gang, Epic Records	Debuted at No. 127 on the Billboard 200
14	bbno$	My Oh My	Self-released	
14	Deno	Boy Meets World	Sony Music UK	Debuted at No. 31 on the UK Albums Chart
14	J. Cole	The Off-Season	Dreamville Records, Roc Nation, Interscope	Debuted at No. 1 on the Billboard 200
14	Kodak Black	Haitian Boy Kodak	Dollaz N Dealz Entertainment, Sniper Gang, Atlantic	Debuted at No. 25 on the Billboard 200
14	Nicki Minaj	Beam Me Up Scotty (Reissue)	Republic Records, Cash Money Records, Young Money Entertainment	Debuted at No. 2 after re-release on the Billboard 200
18	Young Nudy	Dr. Ev4l	RCA Records	Debuted at No. 93 on the Billboard 200
21	42 Dugg	Free Dem Boyz	4 Pockets Full, Collective Music Group	Debuted at No. 8 on the Billboard 200
21	Benny the Butcher and 38 Spesh	Trust the Sopranos	Trust Music	
21	Caskey	Fine Art	Black Sheep Records	
21	Mach-Hommy	Pray for Haiti	Griselda Records	
21	SpotemGottem	Most Wanted	Geffen Records, Jay Rebel	Debuted at No. 103 on the Billboard 200
21	YG and Mozzy	Kommunity Service	Mozzy Records, 4Hunnid Records, Empire Distribution	Debuted at No. 88 on the Billboard 200
21	Young M.A	Off the Yak	M.A Music, 3D	
27	Wretch 32	little BIG Man	Polydor Records	
28	88GLAM	Heaven Can Wait	Self-released	
28	Apathy	Where the River Meets the Sea	Dirty Version Records	
28	Bladee	The Fool	Year0001	
28	Bugzy Malone	The Resurrection	B-Somebody	Debuted at No. 7 on the UK Albums Chart
28	DMX	Exodus	Def Jam	Debuted at No. 8 on the Billboard 200
28	Fire in Little Africa	Fire in Little Africa	Motown Records	
28	Juice WRLD	Goodbye & Good Riddance (Anniversary Edition)	Grade A Productions, Interscope Records	
28	Killy	Killstreak 2	Epic Records	
28	Wifisfuneral	Smoking Mirrors	Empire Distribution, Alamo	
29	Earl Swavey	Unphuckwitable	Swave Music Group	
31	Papoose	May	Honorable Records	

=== June ===
Day	Artist(s)	Album	Record label(s)	Entering chart position
2	Sleepy Hallow	Still Sleep?	Winners Circle, RCA Records	Debuted at No. 144 on the Billboard 200
4	Lil Baby & Lil Durk	The Voice of the Heroes	Quality Control, Alamo, Motown	Debuted at No. 1 on the Billboard 200
4	Lloyd Banks	The Course of the Inevitable	Money by Any Means, Inc.	Debuted at No. 84 on the Billboard 200
4	Peter Rosenberg	Real Late	Real Late Records	
4	Smoke DZA	The Hustler's Catalog 2	RFC, Cinematic Music Group	
10	Lil Gotit	Top Chef Gotit	Alamo Records	
11	6ixbuzz	Canada's Most Wanted	6ixbuzz Ent., Warner Music Group	
11	Bobby Sessions	Manifest	Def Jam	
11	Guapdad 4000 & !llmind	1176 (Deluxe)	12Tone Music, 88rising, PARADISE RISING	
11	JayDaYoungan	23 Is Back	Atlantic Records	
11	Kodak Black	Happy Birthday Kodak	Atlantic, Sniper Gang	Debuted at No. 184 on the Billboard 200
11	Larry June	Orange Print	The Freeminded, Empire Distribution	Debuted at No. 125 on the Billboard 200
11	Migos	Culture III	Quality Control Music, Motown Records, Capitol Records	Debuted at No. 2 on the Billboard 200
11	Pi'erre Bourne	The Life of Pi'erre 5	SossHouse, Interscope Records	Debuted at No. 35 on the Billboard 200
11	Polo G	Hall of Fame	Columbia, ODA	Debuted at No. 1 on the Billboard 200
11	Skyzoo	All the Brilliant Things	Mello Music Group	
11	Your Old Droog	TIME	Mongoloid Banks, Nature Sounds	
16	Young Noble and Dirty Bert	Crazy 80's Babies	Outlaw Recordz, Broken Novel ENT	
17	Various Artists	F9: The Fast Saga (Original Motion Picture Soundtrack)	Atlantic Records, Universal	
18	GoldLink	HARAM!	RCA Records	
18	Gucci Mane	Ice Daddy	Atlantic Records, 1017 Records	Debuted at No. 34 on the Billboard 200
21	Mike	Disco!	10k	
25	Doja Cat	Planet Her	Kemosabe Records, RCA Records	Debuted at No. 2 on the Billboard 200
25	Evidence	Unlearning, Vol. 1	Rhymesayers Entertainment	
25	Jet Life	Welcome to Jet Life Recordings 2	Which Way Is Up, LLC, Jet Life	
25	Juicy J	The Hustle Still Continues	Trippy Music, Entertainment One	
25	Logic	YS Collection, Vol. 1	Def Jam Recordings	Debuted at No. 56 on the Billboard 200
25	Ski Mask the Slump God	Sin City The Mixtape	Victor Victor, Republic Records	Debuted at No. 39 on the Billboard 200
25	Skizzy Mars	Fun & Problems	Kingmaker Records	
25	Tyler, the Creator	Call Me If You Get Lost	Columbia Records	Debuted at No. 1 on the Billboard 200
25	Trae tha Truth	48 Hours After	ABN, Empire	
26	Loe Shimmy	Zuper Powerz	Self-released	
30	Fenix Flexin	Fenix Flexin Vol. 1	Atlantic Records	
30	Papoose	June	Honorable Records	

=== July ===
Day	Artist(s)	Album	Record label(s)	Entering chart position
2	Young Buck	40 Days and 40 Nights	Cashville Records	
2	Nas	It Was Written (Expanded Edition)	Columbia Records	
2	G Herbo	25	Epic Records, Machine	Debuted at No. 5 on the Billboard 200
2	Yungeen Ace	Life of Betrayal 2x	Cinematic Music Group, ATK	Debuted at No. 119 on the Billboard 200
4	1982 (Statik Selektah & Termanology)	The Summer EP	ShowOff Records	
5	Issa Gold	Tempus	Overland Hills Records	
9	Styles P	Ghosting	SHR Records, Empire Distribution	
9	IDK	USee4Yourself	Warner, Clue	Debuted at No. 164 on the Billboard 200
9	Rejjie Snow	Baw Baw Black Sheep	300 Entertainment	
9	Tkay Maidza	Last Year Was Weird, Vol. 3	4AD	
9	Various Artists	Space Jam: A New Legacy (Original Motion Picture Soundtrack)	Republic, WaterTower Music	
9	Vince Staples	Vince Staples	Motown Records	Debuted at No. 21 on the Billboard 200
16	Blxst & Bino Rideaux	Sixtape 2	EVGLE, Out The Blue, Def Jam	Debuted at No. 117 on the Billboard 200
16	Enny	Under Twenty Five	FAMM	
16	KSI	All Over the Place	RBC, BMG	Debuted at No. 1 on the UK Albums Chart; Debuted at No. 94 on the Billboard 200
16	Pop Smoke	Faith	Victor Victor Worldwide, Republic Records	Debuted at No. 1 on the Billboard 200
16	Remble	It's Remble	Warner Records	
16	Since	Since 16'	Boiling Point Project	Debuted at No. 57 on the Gaon Album Chart
21	EST Gee	Bigger Than Life or Death	Collective Music Group, Interscope Records	Debuted at No. 65 on the Billboard 200
23	Avelino	Ego Kills	OddChild Music	
23	Childish Major	Thank You, God. For It All.	Atlantic Records Group	
23	Dave	We're All Alone in This Together	Neighbourhood Recordings	Debuted at No. 1 on the UK Albums Chart
23	Mike Stud	the highs.	4THEHOMIES Records LLC, Ditto Music	Debuted at No. 56 on the Billboard 200
23	The Kid Laroi	F*CK LOVE 3: OVER YOU	Grade A, Columbia	
23	Yung Bleu	Moon Boy	Vondross, Empire Distribution	Debuted at No. 12 on the Billboard 200
30	Adonis & Thelonious Martin	The Lord of the West	The Home Team Music Group	
30	B Young	Differences	GameTime Music Group	Debuted at No. 79 on the UK Albums Chart
30	Dave East & Harry Fraud	Hoffa	Surf School	Debuted at No. 137 on the Billboard 200
30	Isaiah Rashad	The House Is Burning	Top Dawg Entertainment, Warner Records	Debuted at No. 7 on the Billboard 200
30	Logic	Bobby Tarantino III	Def Jam	Debuted at No. 26 on the Billboard 200
30	Skepta	All In	Boy Better Know	
30	Tha Dogg Pound	Dogg Pound Gangstaz	Felder	
30	Unknown T	Adolescence	Island Records	Debuted at No. 8 on the UK Albums Chart
30	Young Dolph	Paper Route Illuminati	Paper Route Empire	Debuted at No. 22 on the Billboard 200
31	Papoose	July	Honorable Records	

=== August ===
Day	Artist(s)	Album	Record label(s)	Entering chart position
4	Young Nudy	Rich Shooter	RCA Records	Debuted at No. 123 on the Billboard 200
6	Fredo	Independence Day	Since 93	Debuted at No. 9 on the UK Albums Chart
6	Fredo Bang	Murder Made Me	Se Lavi, Def Jam	Debuted at No. 89 on the Billboard 200
6	Glaive	All Dogs Go to Heaven	Interscope	
6	Nas	King's Disease II	Mass Appeal	Debuted at No. 3 on the Billboard 200
6	Youngn Lipz	Area Baby	Biordi	Debuted at No. 7 on the ARIA Charts
13	Benny the Butcher	Pyrex Picasso	Rare Scrilla, B$F	
13	Boldy James & The Alchemist	Bo Jackson	ALC Records	
13	Chavo & Pi'erre Bourne	Chavo's World 2	SossHouse	
13	Fat Joe, DJ Drama and Cool & Dre	What Would Big Do 2021	Terror Squad Entertainment	
13	Iggy Azalea	The End of an Era	Bad Dreams, Empire Distribution	
13	K Camp	Float	Interscope Records, RARE Sound	Debuted at No. 122 on the Billboard 200
13	Ka	A Martyr's Reward	Iron Works	
13	$uicideboy$	Long Term Effects of Suffering	G5	Debuted at No. 7 on the Billboard 200
13	YNW Melly	Just a Matter of Slime	300 Entertainment	Debuted at No. 11 on the Billboard 200
20	Blanco	City of God	Polydor Records	
20	Blu, Mickey Factz & Nottz	The Narrative	Soulspazm, SCHMTCS	
20	B Wise	Jamie	Semi Pro Sound	
20	Dame D.O.L.L.A.	Different On Levels The Lord Allowed	Front Page Music	
20	Rod Wave	SoulFly (Deluxe)	Alamo Records	
20	Shaybo	Queen of the South	Black Butter	
20	Smoke DZA, 183rd and Nym Lo	Thanks Again	Self-released	
20	SosMula	13 Songs 2 Die 2	Universal Music Group, Republic Records, Hikari-ULTRA	
20	Trippie Redd	Trip at Knight	Caroline Records	Debuted at No. 2 on the Billboard 200
24	CJ Fly	Not What You're Expecting	Pro Era	
27	Belly	See You Next Wednesday	XO, Roc Nation	Debuted at No. 191 on the Billboard 200
27	Bliss n Eso	The Sun	Flight Deck, Mushroom	Debuted at No. 2 on the ARIA Charts
27	Brother Ali	Brother Minutester, Vol. 1	Travelers Media LLC	
27	Curren$y and Trauma Tone	Highest in Charge	Jet Life Recordings	
27	Grip	I Died for This!?	Stray Society, Shady, Interscope	
27	Joey Cool	i tried to be normal once	Strange Music, INgrooves	
27	KSI	All Over the Place (Deluxe)	RBC Records, BMG	
27	Lil Tecca	We Love You Tecca 2	Galactic Records, Republic Records	Debuted at No. 10 on the Billboard 200
27	Nelly	Heartland	Records, Columbia Records	Debuted at No. 45 on the Billboard 200
27	Not3s	3 Th3 Album	Sony Music	
27	OhGeesy	Geezyworld	Atlantic	Debuted at No. 102 on the Billboard 200
27	Westside Gunn	Hitler Wears Hermes 8: Sincerely Adolf (Side A)	Griselda	
Kodak Black	Before the Album	Sniper Gang		
29	Kanye West	Donda	GOOD, Def Jam	Debuted at No. 1 on the Billboard 200
31	Papoose	August	Honorable Records	

=== September ===
Day	Artist(s)	Album	Record label(s)	Entering chart position
2	Big30	King of Killbranch	N-Less, Bread Gang, Interscope	Debuted at No. 13 on the Billboard 200
3	Drake	Certified Lover Boy	OVO Sound, Republic Records	Debuted at No. 1 on the Billboard 200
3	Duckwrth	SG8*	SuperGood, The Blind Youth	
3	Jehry Robinson	The Name Is Not Important	Strange Music, INgrooves	
3	Little Simz	Sometimes I Might Be Introvert	AGE 101 Music	Debuted at No. 4 on the UK Albums Chart
3	S1mba	Good Time Long Time	Rax, Parlophone	
3	Various artists	Shang-Chi and the Legend of the Ten Rings: The Album	Marvel Music, Hollywood, Interscope	Debuted at No. 160 on the Billboard 200
5	Earl Swavey	Gangland 4	Swave Music Group	
10	AZ	Doe or Die II	Quiet Money Records	
10	Baby Keem	The Melodic Blue	pgLang, Columbia	Debuted at No. 5 on the Billboard 200
10	Common	A Beautiful Revolution Pt. 2	Loma Vista Recordings	
10	Fiend	Lil' Ghetto Boy	Jet Life Recordings	
10	Jazz Cartier	The Fleur Print	Petal Garden, PIVTL Projects	
10	Lisa	Lalisa	YG Entertainment, Interscope	
10	Masked Wolf	Astronomical	Teamwrk, ADA, Warner	
10	Paul Wall	Hall of Fame Hustler	Oiler Mobb Ent.	
10	Twista	Shooter Ready	GMG Entertainment	
10	Wiley	Anti-Systemic	Wiley Records	
10	Yeat	Up 2 Me	Self-released	Debuted at No. 183 on the Billboard 200
15	Injury Reserve	By the Time I Get to Phoenix	Self-released	
17	Andy Mineo	Never Land II	Reach Records/Miner League	Debuted at No. 152 on the Billboard 200
17	Curren$y and Kino Beats	Matching Rolexes	Jet Life Recordings	
17	Jelly Roll	Ballads of the Broken	BBR Music Group	Debuted at No. 166 on the Billboard 200
17	Lil Nas X	Montero	Columbia	Debuted at No. 2 on the Billboard 200
17	M1llionz	Provisional Licence	Ten Percent Music Elite Group	Debuted at No. 10 on the UK Albums Chart
17	Moor Mother	Black Encyclopedia of the Air	Anti- Records	
17	Mozzy	Untreated Trauma	Empire Distribution	Debuted at No. 19 on the Billboard 200
17	Rittz	S.O.S.	CNT Records	
17	Tion Wayne	Green with Envy	Warner UK, Atlantic UK	Debuted at No. 5 on the UK Albums Chart
17	ZillaKami	DOG BOY	Republic, Hikari-ULTRA, Inc.	
20	Outlawz	One Nation	Outlaw Recordz, Dough Networkz	
21	Marlon Craft	Homecourt Advantage, Vol. 1	Self-released	
24	Blu	The Color Blu(e)	New World Color, Dirty Science, Nature Sounds	
24	Dark Lo and Havoc	Extreme Measures	H Class Entertainment, Next Records, LLC	
24	D Smoke	War & Wonders	WoodWorks, Empire Distribution	
24	G-Eazy	These Things Happen Too	BPG, RVG, RCA	Debuted at No. 19 on the Billboard 200
24	Larry June & Cardo	Into the Late Night	The Freeminded, Empire Distribution	
24	MoStack	High Street Kid 2	MizerMillion Entertainment, EMI	Debuted at No. 40 on the UK Albums Chart
24	Westside Gunn	Hitler Wears Hermes 8: Sincerely Adolf (Side B)	Griselda, Empire Distribution	Debuted at No. 196 on the Billboard 200
24	Young Roddy	God Family Money	Good$ense, Babygrande	
24	YoungBoy Never Broke Again	Sincerely, Kentrell	Never Broke Again, Atlantic Records	Debuted at No. 1 on the Billboard 200
30	Papoose	September	Honorable Records	

=== October ===
Day	Artist(s)	Album	Record label(s)	Entering chart position
1	Headie One	Too Loyal for My Own Good	Relentless, Sony Music UK	Debuted at No. 26 on the UK Albums Chart
1	Lil Wayne and Rich the Kid	Trust Fund Babies	Young Money, Republic, Rostrum, Rich Forever	Debuted at No. 35 on the Billboard 200
1	Meek Mill	Expensive Pain	Maybach, Atlantic, Dream Chasers	Debuted at No. 3 on the Billboard 200
1	Potter Payper	Thanks for Waiting	0207 Def Jam	Debuted at No. 8 on the UK Albums Chart
1	Ray BLK	Access Denied	Island	
1	Wiki	Half God	Wikset Enterprise	
4	Lute	Gold Mouf	Dreamville, Interscope	
6	Glaive and Ericdoa	Then I'll Be Happy	Interscope, Listen To The Kids	
8	The Alchemist	This Thing of Ours, Vol. 2	ALC Records, Empire Distribution	
8	Atmosphere	Word?	Rhymesayers	
8	bbno$	eat ya veggies	Self-released	
8	Curren$y	Still Stoned on Ocean	Jet Life Recordings	
8	Don Toliver	Life of a Don	Cactus Jack, Atlantic, We Run It	Debuted at No. 2 on the Billboard 200
8	Tech N9ne	Asin9ne	Strange Music, INgrooves	Debuted at No. 82 on the Billboard 200
15	Baker Boy	Gela	Island Australia, Universal Australia	Debuted at No. 3 on the ARIA Charts
15	City Morgue	City Morgue Volume 3: Bottom of the Barrel	Republic, Hikari-Ultra	
15	Dax	Pain Paints Paintings	Living Legends Entertainment	
15	Dom Kennedy	From the Westside With Love Three	The OPM Company	
15	Gucci Mane & The New 1017	So Icy Boyz	1017, Atlantic	Debuted at No. 42 on the Billboard 200
15	Kirk Knight	After Dark	Blacksmith	
15	Mac Miller	Faces (re-release)	REMember, Warner	Debuted at No. 3 after re-release on the Billboard 200
15	Young Thug	Punk	300, YSL, Atlantic	Debuted at No. 1 on the Billboard 200
15	Zack Fox	shut the fuck up talking to me	Parasang	
16	UnoTheActivist & Travis Barker	Might Not Make It	LiveShyneDie, Create Music Group	
18	Maxo Kream	Weight of the World	RCA	
22	Big Zuu	Navigate	Big Joints, eOne Music UK	
22	Comethazine	Comethazine The Album	Hench Mafia, Alamo	Debuted at No. 185 on the Billboard 200
22	Culture Jam	Kawhi Leonard Presents: Culture Jam (Vol. 1)	CJFM Productions	
22	Fetty Wap	The Butterfly Effect	RGF Productions, 300	
22	JPEGMAFIA	LP!	EQT Recordings, Republic	
22	Pouya	Blood Was Never Thick As Water	Self-released	
22	Wale	Folarin II	Maybach, Warner, Every Blue Moon	Debuted at No. 22 on the Billboard 200
27	SahBabii	Do It for Demon	Arena Music Productions	
27	Havoc and Nyce da Future	Future of the Streets (Deluxe Edition)	H Class Entertainment	
29	A$AP Rocky	LIVE.LOVE.A$AP (re-release)	RCA, Polo Grounds, A$AP Worldwide, AWGE	Debuted at No. 43 after re-release on the Billboard 200
29	Big Sean & Hit-Boy	What You Expect	FF to Def Entertainment, HS87, Def Jam	Debuted at No. 76 on the Billboard 200
29	B.o.B	Murd & Mercy (Deluxe)	Bobby Ray Music	
29	Curren$y & Harry Fraud	Regatta	Jet Life Recordings	
29	IDK	USEE4YOURSELF (Deluxe)	Warner, Clue No Clue	
29	Megan Thee Stallion	Something for Thee Hotties	1501 Certified Entertainment, 300 Entertainment	Debuted at No. 5 on the Billboard 200
29	Mick Jenkins	Elephant in the Room	Cinematic	
29	Planet Asia	Rule of Thirds	Bigger Picture Recordings	
29	Reason	No More, No Less: Demo 1	Top Dawg	
29	UnoTheActivist	Unoverse 3	Self-released	
29	Scarlxrd	DeadRising	LXRD Records	
30	Sniper Gang, Syko Bob & Snapkatt	Sniper Gang Presents Syko Bob & Snapkatt: Nightmare Babies	Atlantic, Sniper Gang	Debuted at No. 190 on the Billboard 200
31	Bryson Tiller	Killer Instinct 2: The Nightmare Before	Self-released	
31	Insane Clown Posse	Yum Yum Bedlam	Psychopathic Records	
31	Papoose	October	Honorable Records	

=== November ===
Day	Artist(s)	Album	Record label(s)	Entering chart position
3	Pressa	Gardner Express (Deluxe)	Blue Feathers, Sony Music Canada	
5	2 Chainz	T.R.U. REALigion (Anniversary Edition)	Self-released	
5	Aminé	TWOPOINTFIVE	CLBN, Republic	Debuted at No. 98 on the Billboard 200
5	Bobby Fishscale	The Evolution	Roc Nation	
5	Fat Nick	Gorgeous Glizzy Gordo	Self-released	
5	Key Glock	Yellow Tape 2	Paper Route EMPIRE	Debuted at No. 7 on the Billboard 200
5	Strick	Strick Land	YSL, 300, Atlantic	
5	Summer Walker	Still Over It	LVRN, Interscope	Debuted at No. 1 on the Billboard 200
5	Terrace Martin	DRONES	Sounds of Crenshaw, BMG	
12	A. Chal	Far From Gaz	GAZI WORLD INC.	
12	Aesop Rock & Blockhead	Garbology	Rhymesayers	
12	D Savage	BPL	EMPIRE	
12	DaBaby	Back On My Baby Jesus Sh!t AGAIN	South Coast Music Group, Billion Dollar Baby, Interscope	Debuted at No. 44 on the Billboard 200
12	DaBoii	House Arrest	YWN, EMPIRE	
12	Dappy	Fortune	Self-released	Debuted at No. 88 on the UK Albums Chart
12	Glasses Malone	Glass House	Division Media	
12	Joell Ortiz	Autograph	Mello Music Group	
12	KA$HDAMI	HYPERNOVA.	Republic	
12	Landstrip Chip	Catch My Good Side	Asylum	
12	Lil Reese	Supa Savage 3	RBC Records	
12	Lil Zay Osama	Trench Baby 2	Warner	
12	Money Man	Blockchain	Black Circle, EMPIRE	Debuted at No. 13 on the Billboard 200
12	Ramz	Retro Boy	RP Entertainment	
12	Silk Sonic	An Evening with Silk Sonic	Aftermath, Atlantic	Debuted at No. 2 on the Billboard 200
12	Ye Ali	Dangerous	THJ, Cinq Music Group	
14	Kanye West	Donda (Deluxe)	GOOD, Def Jam	
19	Apollo Brown & Stalley	Blacklight	Mello Music Group	
19	D-Block Europe	Home Alone 2	Self-released	Debuted at No. 6 on the UK Albums Chart
19	French Montana	They Got Amnesia	Epic, Bad Boy, Coke Boys	Debuted at No. 59 on the Billboard 200
19	Isaiah Rashad	The House Is Burning [homies begged]	Top Dawg, Warner	
19	Jedi Mind Tricks	The Funeral and the Raven	Iron Tusk	
19	KAYTRANADA	Intimidation	KAYTRANADA, RCA	
19	Max B	Negro Spirituals	EMG, Phase One Network	
19	Never Broke Again	Never Broke Again: The Compilation Volume 1	Never Broke Again, Motown	Debuted at No. 88 on the Billboard 200
19	Radamiz	Every Bad Day Has Good News	Radamiz Is Limitless LLC	
19	Snoop Dogg	Snoop Dogg Presents Algorithm	Doggy Style, Def Jam	Debuted at No. 166 on the Billboard 200
26	BONES	SCRAPS	TeamSESH, EMPIRE	
26	Boosie Badazz	Mississippi	Bad Azz Music Syndicate	
26	Chillinit	Family Ties	420 Family	Debuted at No. 5 on the ARIA Charts
26	R.A.P. Ferreira	the Light Emitting Diamond Cutter Scriptures	Ruby Yacht	
26	Troy Ave	God Is Great Paper Straight	BSB Records	
29	Curren$y & Cash Fargo	Land Air Sea	Jet Life Recordings	
29	Your Old Droog	Space Bar	Mongoloid Banks	
30	Papoose	November	Honorable Records	

=== December ===
Day	Artist(s)	Album	Record label(s)	Entering chart position
2	Cozz	Fortunate	Dreamville, Interscope	
2	Tierra Whack	Rap?	Interscope	
3	Berner	Gotti	Bern One Entertainment	Debuted at No. 23 on the Billboard 200
3	Dusty Locane	Untamed	EMPIRE	Debuted at No. 123 on the Billboard 200
3	EST Gee	Bigger Than Life or Death, Pt. 2	Collective Music Group, Interscope Records	Debuted at No. 65 on the Billboard 200
3	LUCKI & F1lthy	WAKE UP LUCKI	EMPIRE	
3	Nardo Wick	Who Is Nardo Wick?	RCA, Flawless Entertainment	Debuted at No. 19 on the Billboard 200
3	Polo G	Hall of Fame 2.0	Columbia, ODA	
3	Styles P & Havoc	Wreckage Manner	The Phantom Entertainment, MNRK Records	
4	Mach-Hommy	Balens Cho (Hot Candles)	Nature Sounds	
5	Earl Swavey	The Dirtiest	Swave Music Group	
8	Russ	CHOMP 2	Russ My Way	
10	A Boogie wit da Hoodie	B4 AVA	Atlantic Records, Highbridge	Debuted at No. 26 on the Billboard 200
10	Big Boi & Sleepy Brown	Big Sleepover	Purple Ribbon, HITCO	
10	Juice WRLD	Fighting Demons	Grade A, Interscope	Debuted at No. 2 on the Billboard 200
10	Lil Pump & Ronny J	No Name	Tha Lights Global, ONErpm	
10	MadeinTYO & UnoTheActivist	Yokohama	Yokohama	
10	Pi'erre Bourne & TM88	Yo!88	Capitol, Interscope	
10	PnB Rock	2 Get You Thru The Rain	Atlantic Records	
10	Rick Ross	Richer Than I Ever Been	Maybach, Epic	Debuted at No. 22 on the Billboard 200
10	Tory Lanez	Alone at Prom	One Umbrella	Debuted at No. 59 on the Billboard 200
10	Wiz Khalifa, Cardo & Sledgren	Wiz Got Wings	Taylor Gang Entertainment	
10	YoungBoy Never Broke Again & Birdman	From the Bayou	Never Broke Again, Cash Money Records	Debuted at No. 19 on the Billboard 200
16	Chief Keef	4NEM	Glo Gang, RBC	Debuted at No. 141 on the Billboard 200
17	Boldy James and The Alchemist	Super Tecmo Bo	ALC Records	
17	Gucci Mane	So Icy Christmas	1017 Records, Atlantic Records	
17	Roddy Ricch	Live Life Fast	Atlantic Records	Debuted at No. 4 on the Billboard 200
24	Curren$y	Pilot Talk IV	Jet Life Recordings	
24	Nas	Magic	Mass Appeal	Debuted at No. 27 on the Billboard 200
31	Papoose	December	Honorable Records	

== Highest-charting songs ==
=== United States ===
Hip hop songs from any year which charted in the 2021 Top 40 of the Billboard Hot 100
Song	Artist	Project	Peak position
"Up"	Cardi B	Am I the Drama?	1
"Way 2 Sexy"	Drake featuring Future and Young Thug	Certified Lover Boy	1
"What's Next"	Drake	Scary Hours 2	1
"Industry Baby"	Lil Nas X and Jack Harlow	Montero	1
"Montero (Call Me by Your Name)"	Lil Nas X	Montero	1
"Rapstar"	Polo G	Hall of Fame	1
"Stay"	The Kid Laroi and Justin Bieber	F*ck Love 3: Over You	1
"My Life"	J. Cole, 21 Savage and Morray	The Off-Season	2
"Girls Want Girls"	Drake featuring Lil Baby	Certified Lover Boy	2
"Wants and Needs"	Drake featuring Lil Baby	Scary Hours 2	2
"Lemon Pepper Freestyle"	Drake featuring Rick Ross	Scary Hours 2	3
"Calling My Phone"	Lil Tjay and 6lack	Destined 2 Win	3
"Kiss Me More"	Doja Cat featuring SZA	Planet Her	3
"Fair Trade"	Drake featuring Travis Scott	Certified Lover Boy	3
"Champagne Poetry"	Drake	Certified Lover Boy	4
"Knife Talk"	Drake featuring 21 Savage and Project Pat	Certified Lover Boy	4
"Rumors"	Lizzo and Cardi B	—N/a	4
"Amari"	J. Cole	The Off-Season	5
"Astronaut in the Ocean"	Masked Wolf	Astronomical	6
"Hurricane"	Kanye West	Donda	6
"One Right Now"	Post Malone and the Weeknd	Twelve Carat Toothache	6
"In the Bible"	Drake featuring Lil Durk and Giveon	Certified Lover Boy	7
"Pride Is the Devil"	J. Cole and Lil Baby	The Off-Season	7
"95 South"	J. Cole	The Off-Season	8
"Interlude"	J. Cole	The Off-Season	8
"Without You"	The Kid Laroi	F*ck Love (Savage)	8
"Need to Know"	Doja Cat	Planet Her	8
"Papi's Home"	Drake	Certified Lover Boy	8
"TSU"	Drake	Certified Lover Boy	9
"What You Know Bout Love"	Pop Smoke	Shoot for the Stars, Aim for the Moon	9
"Whoopty"	CJ	Loyalty Over Royalty	10
"Love All"	Drake featuring Jay-Z	Certified Lover Boy	10
"Jail"	Kanye West	Donda	10
"Off the Grid"	Kanye West	Donda	11
"Escape Plan"	Travis Scott	—N/a	11
"Miss the Rage"	Trippie Redd and Playboi Carti	Trip at Knight	11
"Tombstone"	Rod Wave	SoulFly	11
"You Right"	Doja Cat and the Weeknd	Planet Her	11
"No Friends in the Industry"	Drake	Certified Lover Boy	11
"N 2 Deep"	Drake featuring Future	Certified Lover Boy	12
"Beat Box"	SpotemGottem	Final Destination	12
"Seeing Green"	Nicki Minaj, Drake and Lil Wayne	Beam Me Up Scotty	12
"Solid"	Young Thug and Gunna featuring Drake	Slime Language 2	12
"Ok Ok"	Kanye West	Donda	12
"Back in Blood"	Pooh Shiesty featuring Lil Durk	Shiesty Season	13
"Motley Crew"	Post Malone	—N/a	13
"Applying Pressure"	J. Cole	The Off-Season	13
"100 Mil'"	J. Cole and Bas	The Off-Season	14
"Best Friend"	Saweetie featuring Doja Cat	Pretty Bitch Music	14
"WusYaName"	Tyler, the Creator featuring YoungBoy Never Broke Again and Ty Dolla Sign	Call Me If You Get Lost	14
"Pipe Down"	Drake	Certified Lover Boy	14
"On Me"	Lil Baby	—N/a	15
"Having Our Way"	Migos featuring Drake	Culture III	15
"Hats Off"	Lil Baby, Lil Durk and Travis Scott	The Voice of the Heroes	16
"Ruff Ryders' Anthem"	DMX	It's Dark and Hell Is Hot	16
"Street Runner"	Rod Wave	SoulFly	16
"Streets"	Doja Cat	Hot Pink	16
"Thot Shit"	Megan Thee Stallion	Something for Thee Hotties	16
"Whole Lotta Money"	Bia featuring Nicki Minaj	For Certain	16
"7AM on Bridle Path"	Drake	Certified Lover Boy	16
"Junya"	Kanye West	Donda	16
"Moon"	Kanye West	Donda	17
"Who Want Smoke??"	Nardo Wick featuring G Herbo, Lil Durk and 21 Savage	Who Is Nardo Wick?	17
"Ski"	Young Thug and Gunna	Slime Language 2	18
"You're Mines Still"	Yung Bleu featuring Drake	Love Scars: The 5 Stages of Emotions	18
"Family Ties"	Baby Keem and Kendrick Lamar	The Melodic Blue	18
"Race My Mind"	Drake	Certified Lover Boy	18
"Let Go My Hand"	J. Cole, Bas and 6lack	The Off-Season	19
"Punchin' the Clock"	J. Cole	The Off-Season	20
"Already Dead"	Juice Wrld	Fighting Demons	20
"Bubbly"	Young Thug, Drake and Travis Scott	Punk	20
"Every Chance I Get"	DJ Khaled featuring Lil Baby and Lil Durk	Khaled Khaled	20
"Late at Night"	Roddy Ricch	Live Life Fast	20
"My Ex's Best Friend"	Machine Gun Kelly and Blackbear	Tickets to My Downfall	20
"Praise God"	Kanye West	Donda	20
"Wockesha"	Moneybagg Yo	A Gangsta's Pain	20
"Voice of the Heroes"	Lil Baby and Lil Durk	The Voice of the Heroes	21
"Bad Boy"	Juice Wrld and Young Thug	—N/a	22
"Richer"	Rod Wave featuring Polo G	SoulFly	22
"Sharing Locations"	Meek Mill featuring Lil Baby and Lil Durk	Expensive Pain	22
"IMY2"	Drake featuring Kid Cudi	Certified Lover Boy	22
"Straightenin"	Migos	Culture III	23
"Lil Bit"	Nelly and Florida Georgia Line	Heartland	23
"Throat Baby (Go Baby)"	BRS Kash	Kash Only	24
"Ain't Shit"	Doja Cat	Planet Her	24
"Yebba's Heartbreak"	Drake and Yebba	Certified Lover Boy	24
"You Only Live Twice"	Drake featuring Lil Wayne and Rick Ross	Certified Lover Boy	25
"The Climb Back"	J. Cole	The Off-Season	25
"No More Parties"	Coi Leray featuring Lil Durk	Trendsetter	26
"Mafia"	Travis Scott	—N/a	26
"No Return"	Polo G featuring the Kid Laroi and Lil Durk	Hall of Fame	26
"Fountains"	Drake featuring Tems	Certified Lover Boy	26
"Jesus Lord"	Kanye West	Donda	26
"Jonah"	Kanye West	Donda	27
"Avalanche"	Migos	Culture III	27
"Get Along Better"	Drake featuring Ty Dolla Sign	Certified Lover Boy	27
"Cry Baby"	Megan Thee Stallion featuring DaBaby	Good News	28
"Hunger on Hillside"	J. Cole and Bas	The Off-Season	28
"Bad Morning"	YoungBoy Never Broke Again	Sincerely, Kentrell	28
"Let's Go Brandon"	Bryson Gray featuring Tyson James and Chandler Crump	—N/a	28
"Believe What I Say"	Kanye West	Donda	28
"Girl of My Dreams"	Juice Wrld and Suga	Fighting Demons	29
"God Breathed"	Kanye West	Donda	30
"Sorry Not Sorry"	DJ Khaled featuring Nas, Jay-Z and James Fauntleroy	Khaled Khaled	30
"Time Today"	Moneybagg Yo	A Gangsta's Pain	31
"2040"	Lil Baby and Lil Durk	The Voice of the Heroes	31
"Track Star"	Mooski	Melodic Therapy 4 the Broken	31
"Your Heart"	Joyner Lucas and J. Cole	—N/a	32
"Fucking Fans"	Drake	Certified Lover Boy	32
"Close"	J. Cole	The Off-Season	33
"Gang Gang"	Polo G and Lil Wayne	Hall of Fame	33
"Real as It Gets"	Lil Baby featuring EST Gee	—N/a	34
"Burn"	Juice Wrld	Fighting Demons	34
"How It Feels"	Lil Baby and Lil Durk	The Voice of the Heroes	34
"Shottas (Lala)"	Moneybagg Yo	A Gangsta's Pain	35
"The Remorse"	Drake	Certified Lover Boy	35
"Intro (Hate on Me)"	Meek Mill	Expensive Pain	36
"On My Side"	YoungBoy Never Broke Again	Sincerely, Kentrell	37
"Gyalis"	Capella Grey	—N/a	38
"Let's Go Brandon"	Loza Alexander	—N/a	38
"Ball If I Want To"	DaBaby	—N/a	39
"Pissed Me Off"	Lil Durk	7220	39
"Finesse Out the Gang Way"	Lil Durk featuring Lil Baby	The Voice	39
"Juggernaut"	Tyler, the Creator featuring Lil Uzi Vert and Pharrell Williams	Call Me If You Get Lost	40
"Remote Control"	Kanye West	Donda	40
"No Where"	YoungBoy Never Broke Again	Sincerely, Kentrell	40

=== United Kingdom ===
Hip hop songs from any year which charted in the 2021 Top 10 of the UK Singles Chart
Song	Artist	Project	Peak position
"Body"	Russ Millions and Tion Wayne	Green with Envy	1
"Latest Trends"	A1 x J1	—N/a	2
"Clash"	Dave featuring Stormzy	We're All Alone in This Together	2
"Don't Play"	KSI, Anne-Marie and Digital Farm Animals	All Over the Place	2
"Money Talks"	Fredo featuring Dave	Money Can't Buy Happiness	3
"Obsessed With You"	Central Cee	23	4
"Verdansk"	Dave	We're All Alone in This Together	4
"Bringing It Back"	Digga D and AJ Tracey	Made in the Pyrex and Flu Game	5
"Flowers (Say My Name)"	ArrDee	Pier Pressure	5
"Oliver Twist"	ArrDee	Pier Pressure	6
"Wasted"	Digga D featuring ArrDee	Noughty By Nature	6
"In The Fire"	Dave featuring Fredo, Meekz, Giggs and Ghetts	We're All Alone in This Together	6
"Commitment Issues"	Central Cee	Wild West	9
"Titanium"	Dave	—N/a	9

== Highest first-week consumption ==
List of albums with the highest first-week consumption (sales + streaming + track equivalent), as of September 2021 in the United States
Number	Album	Artist	1st-week consumption	1st-week position	Refs
1	Certified Lover Boy	Drake	613,000	1	
2	Donda	Kanye West	309,000	1	
3	The Off-Season	J. Cole	282,000	1	
4	Call Me If You Get Lost	Tyler, the Creator	169,000	1	
5	The Voice of the Heroes	Lil Baby & Lil Durk	150,000	1	
6	Hall of Fame	Polo G	143,000	1	
7	Sincerely, Kentrell	YoungBoy Never Broke Again	137,000	1	
8	Culture III	Migos	130,500	2	
9	SoulFly	Rod Wave	130,000	1	
10	Montero	Lil Nas X	126,000	2	

== All critically reviewed albums ranked ==
=== Metacritic ===
Number	Artist	Album	Average score	Number of reviews	Reference
1	Ghetts	Conflict of Interest	95	7 reviews	
2	Dave	We're All Alone in This Together	92	11 reviews	
3	Little Simz	Sometimes I Might Be Introvert	88	24 reviews	
4	Tyler, the Creator	Call Me If You Get Lost	88	20 reviews	
5	Madlib	Sound Ancestors	87	10 reviews	
6	Nas	King's Disease II	86	10 reviews	
7	Genesis Owusu	Smiling with No Teeth	86	8 reviews	
8	Lil Nas X	Montero	85	19 reviews	
9	Mach-Hommy	Pray for Haiti	85	8 reviews	
10	Vince Staples	Vince Staples	84	20 reviews	
11	Wiki	Half God	84	5 reviews	
12	AJ Tracey	Flu Game	84	4 reviews	
13	Moor Mother	Black Encyclopaedia of the Air	83	11 reviews	
14	Armand Hammer and The Alchemist	Haram	83	6 reviews	
15	Injury Reserve	By the Time I Get to Phoenix	82	9 reviews	
16	Isaiah Rashad	The House Is Burning	82	8 reviews	
17	JPEGMAFIA	LP!	82	5 reviews	
18	Mick Jenkins	Elephant in the Room	82	5 reviews	
19	Brockhampton	Roadrunner: New Light, New Machine	79	15 reviews	
20	Benny the Butcher and Harry Fraud	The Plugs I Met 2	79	9 reviews	
21	IDK	USee4Yourself	79	5 reviews	
22	Aesop Rock and Blockhead	Garbology	79	5 reviews	
23	MIKE	Disco!	79	4 reviews	
24	Slowthai	Tyron	78	25 reviews	
25	Nas	Magic	78	8 reviews	
26	Young Thug	Punk	78	6 reviews	
27	Baby Keem	The Melodic Blue	77	11 reviews	
28	Doja Cat	Planet Her	76	14 reviews	
29	J. Cole	The Off-Season	76	10 reviews	
30	Fredo	Independence Day	76	6 reviews	
31	Migos	Culture III	75	9 reviews	
32	YG & Mozzy	Kommunity Service	75	4 reviews	
33	Czarface & MF Doom	Super What?	74	6 reviews	
34	Juice WRLD	Fighting Demons	73	6 reviews	
35	Don Toliver	Life of a Don	72	6 reviews	
36	Rejjie Snow	Baw Baw Black Sheep	72	4 reviews	
37	DMX	Exodus	71	11 reviews	
38	Common	A Beautiful Revolution Pt. 2	70	9 reviews	
39	Roddy Ricch	Live Life Fast	68	7 reviews	
40	Trippie Redd	Trip at Knight	68	5 reviews	
41	French Montana	They Got Amnesia	68	4 reviews	
42	Lil Baby & Lil Durk	The Voice of the Heroes	67	6 reviews	
43	Rick Ross	Richer Than I Ever Been	66	7 reviews	
44	Meek Mill	Expensive Pain	64	6 reviews	
45	Lil Yachty	Michigan Boy Boat	63	6 reviews	
46	KSI	All Over the Place	63	4 reviews	
47	Drake	Certified Lover Boy	60	20 reviews	
48	DJ Khaled	Khaled Khaled	58	8 reviews	
49	Kanye West	Donda	53	19 reviews	
50	Pop Smoke	Faith	53	9 reviews	

== See also ==
- Previous article: 2020 in hip-hop
- Next article: 2022 in hip-hop
