= By Your Side (Rod Wave song) =

2021 single by Rod Wave

Single by Rod Wave

from the album Beautiful Mind
- Released: November 14, 2021
- Length: 3:14
- Label: Alamo; Sony
- Songwriters: Rodarius Green; Thomas Horton; Ryan Hartlove
- Producers: TnTXD; Harto Beats

Rod Wave singles chronology
"Time Heals" (2021)	"By Your Side" (2021)	"Cold December" (2022)

Music video
- "By Your Side" on YouTube

"By Your Side" is a song by American rapper and singer Rod Wave. It was released on YouTube on November 14, 2021, before being uploaded to other platforms on November 22. It is the lead single to Wave's fourth studio album Beautiful Mind (2022). The song sees Rod Wave open a new chapter in life, while reflecting on life after the nine months since he released his third album, SoulFly. The chorus interpolates the Plain White T's' "Hey There Delilah" (2006).

== Background and composition ==
In March 2021, Rod Wave released his second album, SoulFly, which has a track called "Gone Till November", on which he promises: "So I, I'll be gone 'til November, go in and mark your calendar". He fulfilled that promise by releasing "By Your Side" onto YouTube on November 14, and on other digital platforms on November 22. He opens the song by acknowledging that promise. Furthermore, the song contains pitched up vocals and "trunk-rattling" 808s, as Rod reflects on all the success he has achieved in the last year and his progression in the music industry, while also accepting his past. The song contains only one verse, and towards the end of it, Rod references his 2019 track "Cuban Links", on which he raps that he will die wearing Cuban Link jewelry; on "By Your Side" though, he dismisses that notion, as he now prefers luxury brand Richard Mille, and has found a renewed interest in life ("I got inside my bag and got out my feelings"). In the chorus, Rod directly interpolates the first verse from Plain White T's's 2006 single "Hey There Delilah", except he changes "Hey there Delilah" to "Hey there everybody". Genius' Ken Partridge opined that "'By Your Side' isn't a love letter to one person; it's a song for anyone who's stuck in their feelings and would like a little company".

== Music video ==
The music video that accompanied the song's release shows behind-the-scenes footage of Rod Wave's SoulFly tour.

== Charts ==
=== Weekly charts ===
Weekly chart performance for "By Your Side"
Chart (2021–2022)	Peak position
Global 200 (Billboard)	119
US Billboard Hot 100	58
US Hot R&B/Hip-Hop Songs (Billboard)	10
US Rhythmic Airplay (Billboard)	22

=== Year-end charts ===
2022 year-end chart performance for "By Your Side"
Chart (2022)	Position
US Hot R&B/Hip-Hop Songs (Billboard)	38

== Certifications ==
Region	Certification	Certified units/sales
United States (RIAA)	3× Platinum	3,000,000^{‡}
^{‡} Sales+streaming figures based on certification alone.

== Release history ==
Release history for "By Your Side"
Region	Date	Format	Label	Ref.
Various	November 14, 2021	Digital download; streaming	Alamo	
United States	February 15, 2022	Rhythmic contemporary	Alamo	
