= OMDB (Rod Wave song) =

2021 song by Rod Wave

Song by Rod Wave

from the album SoulFly
- Released: March 26, 2021
- Length: 3:05
- Label: Alamo; Geffen; Interscope
- Songwriters: Rodarius Green; Aaron Tago; Alexander Stoddard; Cedric Hill; Aubrey Graham; Noah Shebib; Chantal Kreviazuk; Anthony Palman
- Producers: AStod; Yung Tago

"OMDB" is a song by American rapper and singer Rod Wave from his third studio album SoulFly (2021). It was produced by AStod and Yung Tago. The song contains a prolific sample of "Over My Dead Body" by Drake.

== Composition ==
On the song, Green sings the chorus from the sampled "Over My Dead Body", originally sung by Drake.

== Charts ==
Chart performance for "OMDB"
| Chart (2021) | Peak position |
|---|---|
| US Billboard Hot 100 | 89 |
| US Hot R&B/Hip-Hop Songs (Billboard) | 44 |

== Certifications ==
| Region | Certification | Certified units/sales |
|---|---|---|
| United States (RIAA) | Gold | 500,000^{‡} |
^{‡} Sales+streaming figures based on certification alone.
