= Alone (Rod Wave song) =

2022 single by Rod Wave

Single by Rod Wave

from the album Beautiful Mind
- Released: August 8, 2022
- Length: 3:11
- Label: Alamo
- Songwriters: Rodarius Green; Ed Sheeran; Jake Gosling; William Byrd; Ben Bull
- Producers: Will-A-Fool; B Squared

Rod Wave singles chronology
"Stone Rolling" (2022)	"Alone" (2022)	"Break My Heart" (2022)

Music video
- "Alone" on YouTube

"Alone" is a song by American rapper and singer Rod Wave, released on August 8, 2022 as the fourth single from his fourth studio album Beautiful Mind (2022). It was produced by Will-A-Fool and B Squared.

== Composition ==
The song revolves around the relationship between love and loss. Lyrically, Rod Wave sing-raps about his feelings of loneliness due to abandonment from a lover, over a guitar melody. He interpolates "U.N.I." by Ed Sheeran in the middle of his verse.

== Music video ==
The music video was released alongside the single, and centers on a couple that is in a strained relationship because the man is more interested in "running the streets" with his friends. After the woman dies in an accident, the man realizes how important she was to him and regrets not understanding it before.

== Charts ==
Chart performance for "Alone"
Chart (2022)	Peak position
Global 200 (Billboard)	53
New Zealand Hot Singles (RMNZ)	26
US Billboard Hot 100	21
US Hot R&B/Hip-Hop Songs (Billboard)	7

== Certifications ==
Region	Certification	Certified units/sales
United States (RIAA)	2× Platinum	2,000,000^{‡}
^{‡} Sales+streaming figures based on certification alone.
