= Stone Rolling =

2022 single by Rod Wave

Single by Rod Wave

from the album Beautiful Mind
- Released: July 27, 2022
- Length: 3:00
- Label: Alamo
- Songwriters: Rodarius Green; Thomas Horton; Joseph Boyden; Georgia Boyden
- Producers: TnTXD; BKH Beats; SephGotTheWaves; Geo Vocals

Rod Wave singles chronology
| "Broken Heart" (2022) | "Stone Rolling" (2022) | "Alone" (2022) |

Music video
- "Stone Rolling" on YouTube

"Stone Rolling" is a song by American rapper and singer Rod Wave, released on July 27, 2022 as the third single from his fourth studio album Beautiful Mind (2022). It was produced by TnTXD, SephGotTheWaves and Geo Vocals.

== Composition ==
The song contains a morose beat driven by a guitar melody, over which Rod Wave sings about fulfilling his dreams of traveling to many places as a result of his fame and hoping for a future with no drugs and a beach house for his kids.

== Music video ==
The music video was released alongside the single and was directed by Rod Wave himself. It finds him traveling from his hometown of St. Petersburg, Florida to many other U.S. cities, such as Baltimore and Miami, and also flying to Cancún, Mexico.

== Charts ==
Chart performance for "Stone Rolling"
| Chart (2022) | Peak position |
|---|---|
| US Billboard Hot 100 | 66 |
| US Hot R&B/Hip-Hop Songs (Billboard) | 21 |

== Certifications ==
| Region | Certification | Certified units/sales |
|---|---|---|
| United States (RIAA) | Gold | 500,000^{‡} |
^{‡} Sales+streaming figures based on certification alone.
