= Cold December =

2022 single by Rod Wave

Single by Rod Wave

from the album Beautiful Mind
- Released: January 17, 2022
- Genre: R&B; trap
- Length: 3:13
- Label: Alamo; Sony
- Songwriters: Rodarius Green; Thomas Horton; Luke Walker; Justin Bradbury; Evenson Clauseille
- Producers: TnTXD; Lukecmon; JB; ThatBossEvan

Rod Wave singles chronology
"By Your Side" (2021)	"Cold December" (2022)	"Broken Heart" (2022)

Music video
- "Cold December" on YouTube

Alternate cover
- Alternate cover art of the single

"Cold December" is a song by American rapper and singer Rod Wave. It was released through Alamo Records and Sony Music on January 17, 2022, and is the second single from Wave's fourth studio album Beautiful Mind (2022). The song was produced by TnTXD, Lukecmon, JB, and ThatBossEvan, who all wrote the song with Rod, while the only other known credit is Travis Harrington for being the recording engineer. A country-influenced R&B and trap ballad, the song sees Rod emotionally looking back to previous romantic relationships while it samples American singer-songwriter Hank Williams Jr.'s song, "O.D.'d in Denver", from his thirtieth studio album, Whiskey Bent and Hell Bound (1979).

== Background ==
In an October 2021 Instagram livestream, Rod stated that he most likely would never release "Cold December". In a livestream on the same day as the song's release, he explained that he only released it because of his $15 million deal contract with Alamo Records and Sony Music, in which both labels wanted him to release the song as they made it part of the agreement, while also hinting at his retirement soon as he said that he does not enjoy fame.

== Music video ==
The official music video for "Cold December" premiered alongside the release of the single on January 17, 2022. The video opens up with a quote about not letting ego get in the way of life. Rod Wave sports 2012-2017 reality television series Duck Dynasty cargo pants as he chops wood. He sings the song while the wood gradually burns. Rod reflects on his past relationships while sitting in a cabin in the winter.

== Charts ==
Chart performance for "Cold December"
Chart (2022)	Peak position
Global 200 (Billboard)	83
US Billboard Hot 100	38
US Hot R&B/Hip-Hop Songs (Billboard)	9

== Certifications ==
Region	Certification	Certified units/sales
United States (RIAA)	2× Platinum	2,000,000^{‡}
^{‡} Sales+streaming figures based on certification alone.
