= SoulFly (Rod Wave song) =

2021 song by Rod Wave

Song by Rod Wave

from the album SoulFly
- Released: March 26, 2021
- Length: 3:08
- Label: Alamo; Geffen; Interscope
- Songwriters: Rodarius Green; Thomas Horton; Tahj Vaughn; Rashaad Green; Ryan Hartlove
- Producers: TnTXD; Tahj Money; Shaad K Rounds; Harto

Music video
- "SoulFly" on YouTube

"SoulFly" is the intro and title song by American rapper and singer Rod Wave from his third studio album SoulFly (2021). It was produced by TnTXD, Tahj Money, Shaad K Rounds, and Harto.

== Charts ==
Chart performance for "SoulFly"
Chart (2021)	Peak position
Global 200 (Billboard)	103
US Billboard Hot 100	55
US Hot R&B/Hip-Hop Songs (Billboard)	26

== Certifications ==
Region	Certification	Certified units/sales
United States (RIAA)	Gold	500,000^{‡}
^{‡} Sales+streaming figures based on certification alone.
