= Dior Deposits =

Studio album by Guapdad 4000
- Released: October 25, 2019
- Genre: Hip hop
- Length: 42:01
- Labels: TWNSHP; Warner
- Producers: BRYVN; DTB; Dupri; EKZAKT; Frankie XY; James Delgado; Kenny Beats; Mike & Keys; Poly Boy; the Stereotypes; Terrace Martin

Guapdad 4000 chronology
Scamboy Color (2017)	Dior Deposits (2019)	Platinum Falcon Tape, Vol. 1 (2020)

Singles from Dior Deposits
- 1. "Scammin" Released: July 12, 2019; 2. "First Things First" Released: August 15, 2019; 3. "Prada Process" Released: August 23, 2019; 4. "Gucci Pajamas" Released: October 3, 2019

Dior Deposits is the debut studio album by American rapper Guapdad 4000. It was released on October 25, 2019, by TWNSHP and Warner Records. It includes features from Tory Lanez, 6LACK, Chance the Rapper, G-Eazy, Buddy, and Denzel Curry, among others.

== Singles ==
On July 12, 2019, Guapdad 4000 released the single "Scammin" featuring Mozzy. In August, he released two more singles: "First Things First" featuring G-Eazy, and "Prada Process" featuring 6lack. On October 3, 2019, he released the next single "Gucci Pajamas" featuring Chance the Rapper and Charlie Wilson.

== Critical reception ==
Aaron Williams of Uproxx wrote a positive review of the album saying "His jester-like geniality makes him a joy to listen to and his commitment to the craft of rapping makes listeners take him seriously. The hints of a broader story on Dior Deposits promise more artistic depths for him to plumb on future projects, while his creativity ensures that those tales will be told in engaging, innovative ways."

== Track listing ==
No.	Title	Producer(s)	Length
1.	"Doing Too Much" (featuring Slimmy B)	James Delgado; DTB	3:40
2.	"Stuck with It" (featuring Tory Lanez)	EKZAKT	3:01
3.	"First Things First" (featuring G-Eazy and Reo Cragun)	Mike & Keys	2:58
4.	"Gucci Pajamas" (featuring Chance the Rapper and Charlie Wilson)	The Stereotypes	3:24
5.	"Going Through It" (featuring Nef the Pharaoh and E-40)	Poly Boy	1:31
6.	"Scammin" (featuring Mozzy)	EKZAKT	3:00
7.	"Izayah" (featuring Key!, Maxo Kream, and Denzel Curry)	James Delgado; Kenny Beats	3:33
8.	"Jigga Juice’s Prayer"		1:36
9.	"Iced Out Gold Chain"	Dupri	3:31
10.	"Can’t Stop Finessing"	James Delgado	5:33
11.	"Rolex Rockstar" (featuring Buddy)	Mike & Keys; James Delgado	3:11
12.	"Prada Process" (featuring 6lack)	Frankie XY; BRYVN; James Delgado	3:18
13.	"Stunt on Ghosts" (featuring Mansa)	Terrace Martin	3:45
Total length:			42:01

Deluxe edition
No.	Title	Producer(s)	Length
14.	"Flossin (Remix)" (featuring Snoop Dogg)	James Delgado	3:59
