= Beautiful Mind (album) =

Studio album by Rod Wave
- Released: August 12, 2022
- Genres: Hip-hop; Contemporary hip-hop; Contemporary R&B; soul-trap
- Length: 68:20
- Label: Alamo
- Producers: Aldaz; Amineskkrt; Angel López; Artiisan; Bad Habit; Blondy; BSquared; CcocoBeatZzn; Dawson; DJ Fizzum Fade; Dmac; EELmatic; Geo Vocals; Harto Beats; Jai Beats; JB; JBFlyBoi; John Lam; KaiGoinKrazy; Karltin Bankz; LondnBlue; Luke Walker; Lvl35dav; Nash; Neil Muglurmath; Quise; Sammy; SephGotTheWaves; SnowZCold; Splited Stupid; Suli; Swamiq; Tahj Money; Telvin Pennyman; ThatBossEvan; TnTXD; Travis Harrington; Tre Gilliam; Uncle Cameron; Vukola; Will A Fool; Young Yanabu

Rod Wave chronology
SoulFly (2021)	Beautiful Mind (2022)	Jupiter's Diary: 7 Day Theory (2022)

Singles from Beautiful Mind
- 1. "By Your Side" Released: November 14, 2021; 2. "Cold December" Released: January 17, 2022; 3. "Stone Rolling" Released: July 27, 2022; 4. "Alone" Released: August 8, 2022

Beautiful Mind is the fourth studio album by American rapper and singer Rod Wave, released on August 12, 2022, through Alamo Records. The album features guest appearances from Jack Harlow and December Joy, alongside production from BSquared, DJ Fizzum Fade, Dmac, John Lam, KaiGoinKrazy, Karltin Bankz, LondnBlue, SephGotTheWaves, Tahj Money, TnTXD, Travis Harrington, Tre Gilliam, and several other producers. The album serves as a follow-up to Green's third studio album, SoulFly (2021).

Beautiful Mind received "generally favorable" reviews from music critics who applauded Green's singing voice and the "bitter honesty" of Green's description of his early life. The album debuted at number one on the US Billboard 200, marking Green's second consecutive number one on the chart. It earned 115,000 album-equivalent units, of which 2,000 were pure album sales, and twelve of the twenty-four album tracks debuted on the Billboard Hot 100. Green also surged to the peak of Billboard's Artist 100 chart, up eighty spots from the previous week. The album was supported by four official singles: "By Your Side", "Cold December", "Stone Rolling", and "Alone".

== Background and recording ==
On August 11, 2022, the day before the album's release, Rod Wave appeared on 360 with Speedy Morman, presented by Complex. During the interview, Green covered several topics such as why he retracted his verse from Drake's "Lemon Pepper Freestyle", his plan to stop creating "sad" music, and the creation of Beautiful Mind. Green revealed that he spent approximately a year recording the album. When asked about a Tweet he made, claiming that Beautiful Mind would be his last "sad" album, he went in depth about his reasonings:

The shit that was bothering me, like old trauma, like, I done got older, and I see life in a different view. So, like, shit that was bothering me, shit that I was feeling, it's like— it's like, 'Bro, it ain't serious'. Like, it's serious, but, you know, get— get over it, you know what I'm saying? Like, you good now, you know? And then, I have some periods where I just be like, 'Damn, that shit is so fucked up', like how I be thinking about a certain topic, like, damn, that shit just— that shit really went down like that, or that shit really— you know what I'm saying? But, then I just be like, 'Fuck it, you here now'. But, some days, like even when I made that post, like, that was one of them days where I was like, 'You know what? Fuck this shit. I'm finna stop looking backwards and just go forward and be— you know? Be up. Be happy'. But, I don't know, maybe it's just a mind thing, bruh. The way some days I just be like, caught up in it. You know what I'm saying? It don't be every day, like, some, but, it's like majority of the days I just be caught up in it, thinking about it. But, you know, I'm getting older, I see my— I feel myself changing, like, getting older and just seeing shit differently.

When asked about the album, Green described the album as a "rollercoaster" of his feelings, stating that "one minute you up, one minute you down. Then it'll shoot you back up. It just go up, down. Up and down". He stated that he was having second thoughts about the "rollercoaster" aspect of the album because he didn't want his fans to be "emotionally drained" while listening to the album, but in the end, he left it as is because it's what his fans ask for. He expressed that the aspect is simply his "life" and that "every day, it's life. It just go up and down. Up and down".

== Release and promotion ==
On November 14, 2021, Green released the album's lead single, "By Your Side". The track peaked at number 58 on the Billboard Hot 100. The single was followed by the release of "Cold December" on January 17, 2022. Despite peaking at number 38 on the Hot 100, Green expressed in an Instagram live that originally, he didn't plan to release the track, however, due to his multimillion-dollar recording contract with Alamo Records, it was a requirement that he drops the track. On May 1, Green released "Sorry 4 The Wait", a remix to Future's "Wait for U". Alongside the release of the track, Green announced the release of Beautiful Mind on June 3, 2022. Despite announcing the album's release for June 3, it was pushed back for unknown reasons which cause an uproar from fans. On July 27, Green released the album's third single, "Stone Rolling", while announcing the album's release date for August 12. The track peaked at number 66 on the Hot 100. On August 8, just days prior to the release of the album, the single, "Alone" was released as the fourth and final single from the album. "Alone" marked the highest-peaking single from the album, at number 21 on the Hot 100. On August 10, Green released the album's official tracklist, previewing features from Jack Harlow and December Joy. Following the release of the album, Green embarked on a twenty-five-stop tour, beginning on November 11, 2022, in Minneapolis, MN, and ending in Seattle, WA on December 21, 2022. Toosii and Mariah the Scientist aided the tour.

== Critical reception ==
Professional ratings
Aggregate scores
Source	Rating
Metacritic	73/100
Review scores
Source	Rating
AllMusic	4/5 stars
HipHopDX	3.5/5 stars
Pitchfork	6.9/10
RapReviews	6.9/10
Rolling Stone	3.5/5 stars

Beautiful Mind received generally positive reviews from critics. At Metacritic, which assigns a normalized rating out of 100 to reviews from professional publications, the album received an average score of 73, based on five reviews, indicating "generally favorable reviews".

Writing for AllMusic, TiVo Staff wrote that in comparison to Green's previous records, on Beautiful Mind, he "goes deeper into melody, production, and songwriting" while he praises Green's "incredibly passionate vocal performances over crystal clear instrumentals". However, Staff also stated that Green's formula of "recounting painful memories and reflecting on how far he's come on the road to stardom starts to wear a little thin" halfway through the album. HipHopDX's Nina Hernandez wrote that "the hooks, samples and production elements are all more polished and satisfying" than those on his previous record, SoulFly while praising Green's ability to turn notable pop samples into "dark musings on love, loyalty and the dangers of fame". Hernandez noted that "all the trappings of stardom have enhanced Wave’s artistic output" but that "Wave's penchant for skits, which are less jarring than on SoulFly but still not ideal".

Dylan Green of Pitchfork complimented the variety of topics covered in the songs but complained of many of them "bleeding together" as well as the "overreliance of piano and guitar beats". He wrote that "pain has always been a central aspect of Wave’s music, but his blues are beginning to repeat themselves" while stating that Green's topics of "newer bits of pain and suffering inspired by the slog of fame" are the "best moments" on the album. Steve Juon for RapReviews praised the producers who worked on the album for keeping the "vocal modulation to a minimum", allowing the listeners to "hear the real Rod Wave loud and clear". He stated that "his ability to share his feelings honestly through his songs is a rare gift among rappers", however, he criticized how the album "starts to blend together". Rolling Stone's Mosi Reeves wrote that Green is a "complicated man" who is "teetering between career ambition, melancholy introspection, macho aggression, and heartbroken sensitivity" on Beautiful Mind. Reeves admitted that the album feels as though Green is "charting new territory", however, "listeners might be wary of this chastened figure who nevertheless doggedly sticks to the “'trenches'".

Complex ranked Beautiful Mind at number 45 out of 50 of the best albums of 2022. Jordan Rose wrote that the album "shows that no ceiling is too high" and that Green "is one of the most elite melodic rappers in the game right now because of how he’s able to make his pain sound beautiful". Rose also stated that "the Florida singer makes his melancholy feel relatable", the reasoning behind "why he commands a legion of lovesick fans".

=== Year-end lists ===
Select year-end rankings of Beautiful Mind
Publication	List	Rank	Ref.
Complex	Complex's Best Albums of 2022	45	

== Commercial performance ==
In the United States, Beautiful Mind debuted atop the Billboard 200, earning 115,000 album-equivalent units (including 2,000 in pure sales) in its first week. The album also accumulated a total of 157.73 million on-demand streams of its songs. It became Wave's second consecutive number-one on the chart and fifth top-ten. Green also surged to the top spot of Billboard's Artist 100 chart, moving up 80 spots upon the release of the album. In its second week, the album dropped to number two on the chart, moving an additional 57,000 units. The album was certified gold by the Recording Industry Association of America on November 29, 2022. As of December 2022, Beautiful Mind was the 49th best-selling album in the United States, moving 631,000 album-equivalent units in the year, consisting of 3,000 pure sales, 19,000 song sales, 841,455,000 audio streams, and 79,804,000 video streams. On August 10, 2023, the album was certified platinum, signifying a million units sold.

== Track listing ==
Beautiful Mind track listing
No.	Title	Writer(s)	Producer(s)	Length
1.	"Alone"	Rodarius Green; Ed Sheeran; Jake Gosling; William Byrd; Ben Bull	Will-A-Fool; Bsquared	3:11
2.	"Yungen" (featuring Jack Harlow)	R. Green; Jackman Harlow; Jose Velazquez; Lee Spight III	BabeTruth; Eelmatic	3:46
3.	"Never Get Over Me"	R. Green; Thomas Horton; Neil Muglurmath; Samuel Liu; Marquise Archie; Nicky Kester	TnTXD; Neil; Suli; Quise; Bad HabitZ	2:50
4.	"Stone Rolling"	R. Green; Horton; Joseph Boyden; Georgia Boyden	TnTXD; SephGotTheWaves; Geo Vocals	3:00
5.	"I Know It"	R. Green; Byrd; Bull	Will-A-Fool; Bsquared	2:37
6.	"Forever"	R. Green; Spight; Travis Harrington; Joshua Bates; Rory Yanabu	Eelmatic; Travis Harrington; JBFlyBoi; Young Yanabu	3:34
7.	"No Deal"	R. Green; Dawson Odegard; Samuel Dua; Sergei Kharlamov; Conan Gray; Daniel Nigro; Julia Michaels	ProdByDawson; ProdSammy; Theyhateblondy	3:07
8.	"Quiet Storm" (featuring December Joy)	R. Green; Harrington; Gloria Stewart; Richard Hailey; Gernard Parker	Travis Harrington; Eelmatic	3:43
9.	"Sweet Little Lies"	R. Green; Tahj Vaughn; Lukas Payne; Sterling Reynolds	Tahj Money; LondnBlue; Karltin Bankz	2:54
10.	"Rockstar Heart"	R. Green; Byrd; Bull	Will-A-Fool; Bsquared	2:17
11.	"Fading"	R. Green; Vaughn; Payne; Reynolds; David McDowell	Tahj Money; LondnBlue; Karltin Bankz; DMaconTheTrack	2:43
12.	"Time Kills (Love Birds)"	R. Green; John Lamb; Frank Gilliam III; Colby Green; Davood Boushehri	Bizounce; Luci G	2:53
13.	"Druski Skit"	Drew Desbordes		1:37
14.	"Keep Going"	R. Green; Murenets Nikita; Vuk Vukolic; Dvornikov Kirill; Roman Mironchenko	Swamiq; Vukola; Artiisan; Spoiled Stupid	3:10
15.	"Never Find Us"	R. Green; Horton; McDowell; Nathan Lamarche; Jeremy Fraites; Wesley Schultz	TnTXD; DMaconTheTrack; Nash	2:08
16.	"Mafia"	R. Green; Byrd; Telvin Pennyman	Will-A-Fool; Boogy	2:33
17.	"Me vs. the World"	R. Green; Bates; Melvin Vernell III; Benjamin Campbell	JBFlyBoi; Snow	2:45
18.	"Pieces"	R. Green; Byrd; Bull; Robin Lundbaeck; Tom Lundbaeck; Bell Lundbaeck; Nicole Touma	Will-A-Fool; Bsquared	3:28
19.	"Pt. II"	R. Green; Stewart; Hailey; Parker	Fade	1:06
20.	"Everything"	R. Green; Spight	Eelmatic	2:40
21.	"Married Next Year"	R. Green; Horton; Cameron Hubler; Jaidyn Hullum; Kai Hasegawa	TnTXD; Uncle Cameron; Jai Beats; Kaigoinkrazy	3:10
22.	"Better"	R. Green; Kate Vogel; Saad Ghallab; Evenson Clauseille; Souiyate Amine	Coco; ThatBossEvan; Amineskrtt	2:55
23.	"By Your Side"	R. Green; Horton; Ryan Hartlove	TnTXD; Harto	3:14
24.	"Cold December"	R. Green; Hank Williams Jr.; Horton; Clauseille; Justin Bradbury; Luke Walker	TnTXD; ThatBossEvan; JB; Lukecmon	3:12
Total length:				68:20

Sample credits

- "Alone" contains samples from "U.N.I.", written by Ed Sheeran and Jake Gosling, and performed by the former.
- "No Deal" contains samples from "People Watching", written by Conan Gray and Daniel Nigel, and Julia Michaels, and performed by Gray.
- "Never Find Us" contains an interpolation from "Sleep on the Floor", written by Wesley Schultz and Jeremiah Fraites, and performed by The Lumineers.
- "Me vs. the World" contains an interpolation from "It Ain't Easy", written by Tupac Shakur and Tony Pizarro, and performed by 2Pac.
- "Pieces" contains samples from "Singing Without You", written and performed by Eylie.
- "Pt. II" contains samples from "Just for Your Love", written by Cedric Hailey, Joel Hailey, and Gloria Stewart, and performed by K-Ci & JoJo.
- "By Your Side" contains an interpolation from "Hey There Delilah", written by Tom Higgenson, and performed by Plain White T's.
- "Cold December" contains samples from "O.D.'d in Denver", written and performed by Hank Williams Jr.

== Charts ==
=== Weekly charts ===
Weekly chart performance for Beautiful Mind
Chart (2022)	Peak position
Canadian Albums (Billboard)	34
US Billboard 200	1
US Top R&B/Hip-Hop Albums (Billboard)	1

=== Year-end charts ===
2022 year-end chart performance for Beautiful Mind
Chart (2022)	Position
US Billboard 200	107
US Top R&B/Hip-Hop Albums (Billboard)	42

2023 year-end chart performance for Beautiful Mind
Chart (2023)	Position
US Billboard 200	71
US Top R&B/Hip-Hop Albums (Billboard)	47

== Certifications ==
Certifications for Beautiful Mind
Region	Certification	Certified units/sales
United States (RIAA)	Platinum	1,000,000^{‡}
^{‡} Sales+streaming figures based on certification alone.

== Release history ==
Release dates and formats for Beautiful Mind
Region	Date	Label(s)	Format(s)	Edition(s)	Ref.
Various	August 12, 2022	Alamo	Digital download; streaming	Standard	

== See also ==
- 2022 in hip-hop
- List of Billboard 200 number-one albums of 2022
