= Never Get Over Me =

2022 song by Rod Wave

Song by Rod Wave

from the album Beautiful Mind
- Released: August 12, 2022
- Length: 2:50
- Label: Alamo Records
- Songwriters: Rodarius Green; Thomas Horton
- Producers: TnTXD; Neil; Suli; Quise; Bad HabitZ

"Never Get Over Me" is a song by American rapper and singer Rod Wave from his fourth studio album Beautiful Mind (2022). It was produced by TnTXD, Neil, Suli, Quise, and Bad HabitZ.

== Critical reception ==
Dylan Green for Pitchfork stated that on the track, Wave "brood[s] about picking up women in hotel rooms".

== Charts ==
Chart performance for "Never Get Over Me"
Chart (2022)	Peak position
Global 200 (Billboard)	153
US Billboard Hot 100	48
US Hot R&B/Hip-Hop Songs (Billboard)	14

== Certifications ==
Region	Certification	Certified units/sales
United States (RIAA)	Gold	500,000^{‡}
^{‡} Sales+streaming figures based on certification alone.
