= SoulFly (Rod Wave album) =

Soulfly

Studio album by Rod Wave
- Released: March 26, 2021
- Genres: Hip hop; Southern hip hop; Contemporary hip hop; Contemporary R&B
- Length: 53:33
- Labels: Alamo; Geffen; Interscope
- Producers: A-Dawg; A$tod; Basobeats; Bizounce; Boat Note; CocoBeatSzn; DJ Fizzum Fade; DKeyz; Dmac; DrellOnTheTrack; Drum Dummie; Dzimi; Ebon; Eighty8; EvrGrn; Flynn Cranston; Fraaz; FritzOnDaTrack; Hagan; Harto Beats; Jai Beats; JB; JBFlyBoi; Joel Bolds; Karltin Bankz; KD6; KeyzMusic; KjMj; LondnBlue; LowLowTurnThatUp; LuciG; Luke Walker; MalikOTB; MarsGawd; Mighty Mar; Mook On The Beats; PlutoBrazy; Popstar Benny; RellyMade; Roki; Ryder Johnson; Sam Thraxx; Saucii; Shaad K'Rounds; Taz Taylor; Tahj Money; ThatBossEvan; TnTXD; Travis Harrington; Tre Gilliam; Uncle Cameron; Will A Fool; Yung Tago

Rod Wave chronology
Pray 4 Love (2020)	Soulfly (2021)	Beautiful Mind (2022)

Deluxe edition cover

Singles from SoulFly
- 1. "Street Runner" Released: March 10, 2021; 2. "Tombstone" Released: March 23, 2021; 3. "Richer" Released: March 26, 2021; 4. "Time Heals" Released: August 18, 2021

SoulFly is the third studio album by American rapper and singer Rod Wave, released on March 26, 2021, through Alamo Records, Geffen Records, and Interscope Records. The album features a sole guest appearance from Polo G. Production was handled by Dmac, DrellOnTheTrack, Drum Dummie, Karltin Bankz, LondnBlue, Taz Taylor, Tahj Money, TnTXD, Travis Harrington, Tre Gilliam, and several other producers. The album serves as a follow-up to his second studio album, Pray 4 Love (2020). A deluxe edition of the album was released on August 20, 2021, with an additional nine tracks and extra guest appearances from Kodak Black and Lil Durk.

SoulFly received positive reviews from music critics who praised Green's vocals and the project's lyrical sincerity. The album debuted at number one on the US Billboard 200, marking Green's first number one on the chart. It earned 130,000 album-equivalent units, of which 4,000 were pure album sales, and fourteen of the nineteen album tracks debuted on the Billboard Hot 100. Following the release of the album, Rod Wave topped the Rolling Stone Artists 500 chart for the first time in his career. The album was supported by four official singles: "Street Runner", "Tombstone", "Richer", and "Time Heals".

== Background and recording ==
During Green's interview with The Breakfast Club, he revealed that he initially did not plan to have any features on the album. However, he changed his mind after meeting Polo G at a jewelry store; Polo had told him he was a fan of his work, much to Rod's surprise. He also revealed that the recording process of the album was similar to Pray 4 Love, stating that it was just him and his engineer:

Yeah, it just be me and the engineer. I ain't gon' lie, I ain't had no features on my album, but I was going to the jewelry store and I bumped into Polo G. And when I seen him, I was just like, 'Oh, shit, another rapper'. Like, you know what I'm saying? I was kind of like, not like, I don't wanna saying avoiding bruh, but, I was just like, you know what I'm saying? And he kind of walked up to me like, 'Bruh, I fuck wth you, type shit', I'm like, 'Damn, that's crazy', like I ain't know bro was like that.

== Release and promotion ==
In August 2020, during an interview with Billboard, Green said he planned to release his third album on August 27, however, he released a deluxe edition of Pray 4 Love instead. In January 2021, Green shared the album's cover art on his Instagram while calling out Alamo Records, stating that he won't release the album unless they decide to pay him. Days later, he returned to Instagram, apologizing to his label, assuring fans "we just figured it out everything cool", revealing that the album would be released in a couple of weeks. On March 6, Green announced the release of the album while revealing its tracklist. On March 10, Green released the album's lead single, "Street Runner". On March 23, he released the album's second single, "Tombstone". Upon the album's release, the project's seventh cut, "Richer" featuring Polo G was released as a single. On April 8, Green performed "Tombstone" on The Tonight Show Starring Jimmy Fallon. On August 18, the single "Time Heals" was released. It appeared on the deluxe edition of SoulFly which was released on August 20.

In support of the album, Green would embark on a thirty-six-stop tour throughout the United States, presented by Rolling Loud and Live Nation as the first tour under the new joint venture. The tour began on August 27, 2021, in Houston, Texas, and concluded on October 23 in Seattle, Washington.

== Concept ==
The album continues Rod Wave's candid emotional subject matters about his life and upbringing; "a story of a man scarred from his experiences with his family's struggles and racial disparities". The Fader's Jordan Darville noted: "SoulFly is something like an intense conversation, with Wave's passion and ear for beats makes the listener connect their own life with what Wave is sharing. Whether that's turmoil or flexing, Wave makes his heart's concerns sound universal". Billboard's Jason Lipshutz deemed the album Rod Wave's "most authoritative project to date, a collection of passionate stories coiled around melodies that are croaked out, rapped and crooned".

== Critical reception ==
Professional ratings
Review scores
Source	Rating
AllMusic	4/5 stars
HipHopDX	3.4/5 stars

Writing for AllMusic, Andy Kellman wrote that similarly to Green's previous projects, he "continues to write with sincerity". He concluded his review writing that "Rod's falsetto lilt as he imagines his send-off is as close to heartbreaking as trap-soul—make that music—gets". David Aaron Brake for HipHopDX wrote that Green "eloquently croons about the bittersweet feeling of the come-up", noting that it's a common theme on SoulFly. Describing Green as a "generational talent", Brake concluded his review noting that the album presents him at "his most introspective and lyrically mature" while the "trite instrumentals put a ceiling on the album’s potential".

Uproxx's Aaron Williams praised Rod Wave's vocals for being the foundation of his music: "It's impressive that there are still artists who can do it with just a voice. While there's not a tremendous amount of true introspection or innovation on SoulFly, there is, however, a supreme level of self-assurance and technical craftsmanship. What Rod lacks in wit he makes up in emotion, and where his stories lack detail, he imbues them with a powerful sincerity that makes them read just as truthfully, resonating as deeply as an impressionist portrait". Kazi Magazine found the album consistent: "Beautiful composed beats assist Rod's voice like a pass from LeBron James. It's a case of modern production not overpowering the vocals of the artist. Not only that it was no skips but it was meaningful content".

The Atlantic ranked SoulFly as the seventh best album of the year. Spencer Kornhaber for The Atlantic wrote that Green's "weary tales arrive with churchly trills, nu-metal groans, quiet-storm beats, and zero concern for coolness" while describing the album's lead single, "Street Runner" as a "tearjerker". Complex's Trey Alston ranked the album at number 41, writing that "Rod Wave’s knack for portraying past trauma so effectively is what makes him one of the most intriguing new artists in music".

=== Year-end lists ===
Select year-end rankings of SoulFly
Publication	List	Rank	Ref.
The Atlantic	The Atlantic's 10 Best Albums of 2021	7	
Complex	Complex's Best Albums of 2021	41	

== Commercial performance ==
SoulFly debuted at number one on the US Billboard 200 chart, earning 130,000 album-equivalent units (including 4,000 pure album sales) in its first week. This became Rod Wave's third chart entry and third top-ten album while being his first US number-one album. The album also accumulated a total of 189.2 million on-demand streams of the album's 19 tracks, marking the largest streaming week of 2021 for an R&B/hip-hop album, at the time of its release.

Upon the release of the album, Rod Wave topped the Rolling Stone Artists 500 chart for the first time in his career. Furthermore, SoulFly was the most pre-saved album on Apple Music for two weeks.

== Track listing ==
SoulFly track listing
No.	Title	Writer(s)	Producer(s)	Length
1.	"SoulFly"	Rodarius Green; Thomas Horton; Tahj Vaughn; Rashaad Green; Ryan Hartlove	TNTXD; Tahj Money; Shaad K Rounds; Harto	3:08
2.	"Gone Till November"	Ro. Green; Tevin Revell; Jaehyun Kim	Drum Dummie; KimJ	2:41
3.	"Blame On You"	Ro. Green; Horton; Amman Nurani; Adam Fritzer	TNTXD; Evrgrn; Fritz	2:45
4.	"Don't Forget"	Ro. Green; Horton; Basil von Stietencron	TNTXD; Basobeats	4:09
5.	"Tombstone"	Ro. Green; Jaylon Howard; Eric Foley Jr.; Jaidyn Hullum	Saucii; Eighty 8; Jai Beats	2:40
6.	"All I Got"	Ro. Green; Nikola Pejovic; John Balan; Brayon Nelson	Dzimi; LowLowTurnMeUp; Mook Got The Keys	3:13
7.	"Richer" (featuring Polo G)	Ro. Green; Taurus Bartlett; Roland Hannah; Flynn Cranston	Pluto Brazy; Flynn	3:10
8.	"Street Runner"	Ro. Green; Ruth Berhe; Horton; Lukas Payne; Sterling Reynolds	TNTXD; London Blue; Karltin Bankz	4:12
9.	"Pills & Billz"	Ro. Green; Cameron Hubler; Hannah; Foley	Uncle Cameron; Pluto Brazy; Eighty 8	2:35
10.	"How the Game Go"	Ro. Green; Danny Snodgrass, Jr.; Ryder Johnson; Adawg	Taz Taylor; Johnson; Adawg	2:13
11.	"Shock da World"	Ro. Green; Horton; Hullum; Hubler	TNTXD; Jai Beats; Uncle Cameron	3:24
12.	"What's Love??"	Ro. Green; Nicholas Lira; Lucas Grob	Bizounce; Luci G	2:58
13.	"OMDB"	Ro. Green; Aaron Tago; Alexander Stoddard; Cedric Hill; Aubrey Graham; Noah Shebib; Chantal Kreviazuk; Anthony Palman	Yung Tago; AStod	3:05
14.	"Invisible Scar"	Ro. Green; Horton; Vaughn; Ra. Green; Luke Walker	TNTXD; Tahj Money; Shaad K Rounds; Lukecmon	2:48
15.	"Calling"	Ro. Green; Horton; Pejovic; Hullum	TNTXD; Dzimi; Jai Beats	2:26
16.	"Sneaky Links"	Ro. Green; Horton; David McDowell; Payne; Reynolds	TNTXD; Dmac; London Blue; Karltin Bankz	2:58
17.	"Believe Me"	Ro. Green; Foley; Hubler; Hubert Rokosz	Eighty 8; Uncle Cameron; Rokit	2:39
18.	"Moving On"	Ro. Green; Tyrell Taylor; Kendrell Mattox; Coby Green; Frank Gilliam III; Joel Bolds	Taylor Made; DrellOnTheTrack; Tre Gilliam; DJ Fizzum Fade	2:49
19.	"Changing"	Ro. Green; Horton; Hagan Lange; Patrick Yeboah	TNTXD; Hagan; KeyzMusic	3:00
Total length:				55:33

Deluxe edition bonus tracks
No.	Title	Writer(s)	Producer(s)	Length
20.	"2019"	Ro. Green; William Byrd	Will-A-Fool	3:25
21.	"Escape"	Ro. Green; Evenson Clauseille; Ebon Thomas; Saad Ghallab	ThatBossEvan; Ebon; Coco	2:42
22.	"What's Wrong"	Ro. Green; Gerail Harvey; Marvin Venable	RellyMade; MightyMarv	2:35
23.	"Take the Blame"	Ro. Green; Sam Cohen; Chason Howard	Sam Thraxx; Popstar Benny	2:34
24.	"Get Ready" (featuring Kodak Black)	Ro. Green; Bill Kapri; Joshua Bates; Silas Benediktson; Travis Harrington	JBFlyBoi; Boat Note; Harrington	3:51
25.	"Already Won" (featuring Lil Durk)	Ro. Green; Durk Banks; Byrd	Will-A-Fool	3:32
26.	"Time Heals"	Ro. Green; David Cabral; Javon Reynolds; Josh Joseph; Malik Bynoe-Fisher	Dkeyz; MarsGawd; The Superiors & Co.; MalikOTB	3:13
27.	"Losing My Cool"	Ro. Green; Horton; Hullum; Hubler	TNTXD; Jai Beats; Uncle Cameron	3:29
28.	"Ion Wanna Hear It (Outro)"	Ro. Green; Horton; Justin Bradbury; Kadaivon Dixon	TNTXD; JB; KD6	2:43
Total length:				85:09

Sample credits

- "Gone Till November" contains samples from "Dear Mama", written and performed by Tupac Shakur.
- "Street Runner" contains samples from "Mixed Signals", written by Ruth Berhe, and performed by Ruth B.
- "OMDB" contains samples from "Over My Dead Body", written by Aubrey Graham, Noah Shebib, Anthony Palman, and Chantal Kreviazuk, and performed by Drake.
- "Already Won" contains samples from "Can You Stand the Rain", written by James Harris III and Terry Lewis, and performed by New Edition.

== Charts ==
=== Weekly charts ===
Weekly chart performance for SoulFly
Chart (2021)	Peak position
Canadian Albums (Billboard)	16
Dutch Albums (Album Top 100)	84
Irish Albums (IRMA)	68
US Billboard 200	1
US Top R&B/Hip-Hop Albums (Billboard)	1

=== Year-end charts ===
2021 year-end chart performance for SoulFly
Chart (2021)	Position
US Billboard 200	21
US Top R&B/Hip-Hop Albums (Billboard)	10

2022 year-end chart performance for SoulFly
Chart (2022)	Position
US Billboard 200	42
US Top R&B/Hip-Hop Albums (Billboard)	20

2023 year-end chart performance for SoulFly
Chart (2023)	Position
US Billboard 200	85
US Top R&B/Hip-Hop Albums (Billboard)	50

2024 year-end chart performance for SoulFly
Chart (2024)	Position
US Billboard 200	164

== Certifications ==
Certifications for SoulFly
Region	Certification	Certified units/sales
United States (RIAA)	2× Platinum	2,000,000^{‡}
^{‡} Sales+streaming figures based on certification alone.

== Release history ==
Release dates and formats for SoulfFly
Region	Date	Label(s)	Format(s)	Edition(s)	Ref.
Various	March 26, 2021	Alamo; Geffen; Interscope	Digital download; streaming	Standard	
Various	August 20, 2021	Alamo; Geffen; Interscope	Digital download; streaming	Deluxe	

== See also ==
- 2021 in hip hop music
- List of Billboard 200 number-one albums of 2021
