= Don't Forget (Rod Wave song) =

2021 song by Rod Wave

Song by Rod Wave

from the album SoulFly
- Released: March 26, 2021
- Length: 2:41
- Label: Alamo; Geffen; Interscope
- Songwriters: Rodarius Green; Thomas Horton; Basil von Stietencron
- Producers: TnTXD; Basobeats

"Don't Forget" is a song by American rapper and singer Rod Wave from his third studio album SoulFly (2021). It was produced by TnTXD and Basobeats.

== Charts ==
Chart performance for "Don't Forget"
Chart (2021)	Peak position
Global 200 (Billboard)	129
US Billboard Hot 100	63
US Hot R&B/Hip-Hop Songs (Billboard)	29
