= Richer (song) =

2021 single by Rod Wave featuring Polo G

Single by Rod Wave featuring Polo G

from the album SoulFly
- Released: March 26, 2021
- Genre: Trap
- Length: 3:10
- Label: Alamo
- Songwriters: Rodarius Green; Taurus Bartlett; Roland Hannah; Flynn Cranston
- Producers: Pluto Brazy; Flynn

Rod Wave singles chronology
"Tombstone" (2021)	"Richer" (2021)	"Everything Different" (2021)

Polo G singles chronology
"For My Fans (Freestyle)" (2021)	"Richer" (2021)	"Rapstar" (2021)

"Richer" is a song by American rapper Rod Wave featuring fellow American rapper Polo G. Released on March 26, 2021, as the third single of his third studio album SoulFly, which was released on the same day. The song was written alongside producers Pluto Brazy and Flynn.

== Composition ==
The track uses a country-influenced trap production, with guitar as well as "heavy bass drum and mid-tempo 808s". The rappers sing about their respective upbringings and rises to stardom, and celebrate their fame. In the chorus, Rod Wave croons, "I'm richer than I've ever been".

== Charts ==
Chart performance for "Richer"
Chart (2021)	Peak position
Canada Hot 100 (Billboard)	74
Global 200 (Billboard)	43
New Zealand Hot Singles (RMNZ)	11
US Billboard Hot 100	22
US Hot R&B/Hip-Hop Songs (Billboard)	13

== Certifications ==
Certifications for "Richer"
Region	Certification	Certified units/sales
United States (RIAA)	6× Platinum	6,000,000^{‡}
^{‡} Sales+streaming figures based on certification alone.
