= Time Heals =

2021 single by Rod Wave

Single by Rod Wave

from the album SoulFly
- Released: August 18, 2021
- Length: 3:13
- Label: Alamo
- Songwriters: Rodarius Green; Malik Bynoe-Fisher; Josh Joseph; Javon Reynolds; David Cabral
- Producers: The Superiors & Co.; MalikOTB; MarsGawd; DKeyz

Rod Wave singles chronology
"Before I Go" (2021)	"Time Heals" (2021)	"By Your Side" (2021)

Music video
- "Time Heals" on YouTube

"Time Heals" is a song by American rapper Rod Wave, released on August 18, 2021, with an accompanying music video. It is the fourth single from his third studio album SoulFly (2021), appearing on the deluxe version. The song was produced by The Superiors & Co., MalikOTB, MarsGawd and DKeyz.

== Composition ==
Over piano-laced production, Rod Wave laments on having several women around him to choose, but having trust issues due to his relationships in the past. Nevertheless, he indicates remaining resolute, confessing, "Don't need love, I need me time" and describing himself as "young, wild, and mad broken-hearted".

== Music video ==
Directed by Yawn Rico and shot by Eye 4, the music video begins with Rod Wave riding around in the American countryside on four-wheelers. In the clip, he is seen performing across the country, in front of a private jet, getting a tattoo, and showing his new set of grills.

== Charts ==
Chart performance for "Time Heals"
Chart (2021)	Peak position
US Billboard Hot 100	99
US Hot R&B/Hip-Hop Songs (Billboard)	38

== Certifications ==
Region	Certification	Certified units/sales
United States (RIAA)	Gold	500,000^{‡}
^{‡} Sales+streaming figures based on certification alone.
