= Yungen (Rod Wave song) =

2022 song by Rod Wave

Song by Rod Wave featuring Jack Harlow

from the album Beautiful Mind
- Released: August 12, 2022
- Genre: Hip-hop
- Length: 3:46
- Label: Alamo Records
- Songwriters: Rodarius Green; Jackman Harlow; Jose Velazquez; Lee Spight III
- Producers: BabeTruth; Eelmatic

"Yungen" is a song by American rapper and singer Rod Wave featuring fellow American rapper Jack Harlow from the former's fourth studio album Beautiful Mind (2022). It was written alongside producers BabeTruth and Eelmatic.

== Critical reception ==
AllMusic described the track as a "non-stop rush of heart-rending, pop-adjacent struggle rap", labeling it as a "standout" on the album. HipHopDX's Nina Hernandez wrote that Harlow's verse "isn’t hard on the ears, but he also doesn’t land any lyrical punches". Dylan Green for Pitchfork referred to Green's verse on the track as a "spirited performance" and praised the "clacking synths".

== Charts ==
Chart performance for "Yungen"
Chart (2022)	Peak position
Global 200 (Billboard)	78
New Zealand Hot Singles (RMNZ)	17
US Billboard Hot 100	32
US Hot R&B/Hip-Hop Songs (Billboard)	12

== Certifications ==
Region	Certification	Certified units/sales
United States (RIAA)	Platinum	1,000,000^{‡}
^{‡} Sales+streaming figures based on certification alone.
