= Earl Swavey =

American rapper (1995–2022)

- Birth name: Earl Hatton
- Born: December 8, 1995 Compton, California
- Died: January 9, 2022 (aged 26) Downtown Los Angeles, California
- Genres: West Coast hip hop
- Years active: 2013–2022
- Labels: Swave Music Group

Earl Hatton (December 8, 1995 – January 9, 2022), also known as Earl Swavey, was an American rapper. A noted figure in the West Coast hip hop scene, he was first noticed and mentored by A$AP Yams, releasing a plethora of projects. He died in 2022, after being shot in possible gang activity.

== Early life ==
Earl Hatton was born on December 8, 1995, in Compton, California. His father died when he was a two years old, so he was raised by a single mother. While still young, Swavey was inspired by his brother rapping; his cousin was also rapper Jay Rock.

== Career ==
Swavey ventured into the rap scene by first releasing the mixtape Business Before Pleasure (BBP) in 2013. One of its songs, "Beef", led to A$AP Yams getting in touch with him and mentoring him. In 2021, he dropped three albums, Unphuckwithable, Gangland 4, and The Dirtiest.

== Influences and artistry ==
Swavey was influenced by the artists T.I., Rick Ross, and 50 Cent.

== Death ==
Swavey died on January 9, 2022. An autopsy report later stated that he was driving a car with multiple passengers outside a party in Downtown Los Angeles when he was shot in the back but an unknown assailant and crashed into a parked motorhome. The head trauma Swavey sustained from the collision was a contributing factor in his death along with the gunshot wound. A detective for the Los Angeles Police Department stated that it was most likely that a passenger in Swavey's vehicle shot first before others fired back, in gang-related activities.

== Discography ==
=== Studio albums ===
Title	Details
Unphuckwitable	Released: May 29, 2021; Label: Swave Music Group; Formats: Digital download
Gangland 4	Released: September 5, 2021; Label: Swave Music Group; Formats: Digital download
The Dirtiest	Released: December 5, 2021; Label: Swave Music Group; Formats: Digital download

=== Mixtapes ===
Title	Details
Yurple Rain	Released: February 10, 2015; Label: Self-released; Formats: Digital download
2 Way Swave	Released: April 28, 2018; Label: Safe Money Records; Formats: Digital download

=== Singles ===
Title	Year	Album
"Big Soldier" (with P2)	2017	Non-album singles
"No Sleep" (with Bobby Luv and Nutty Boy)	2018	Non-album singles
"Jigga man"	2021	Unphuckwitable
"Warm Up"	2021	Unphuckwitable
"Shit Talkin" (with I4 Get the Ends)	2021	Non-album singles
