= 1176 (album) =

Studio album by Guapdad 4000 and !llmind
- Released: March 19, 2021
- Genre: Hip-hop
- Length: 43:58
- Label: Twnshp; Roseville; Chester; Paradise Rising; 88rising; 12Tone Music
- Producer: !llmind; Abaz; Al Hug; Don Alfonso; DTB; Florianvibes; James Delgado; Kount Koal; Mansa; Mario Luciano; Mosaic Music; P-Lo; Pearl Lion; SlummA Beats; Shuko; Spencer Stewart; Sucuki; X-Plosive

Guapdad 4000 chronology
Platinum Falcon Returns (2020)	1176 (2021)

Singles from 1176
- 1. "How Many" Released: February 12, 2021; 2. "She Wanna" Released: March 9, 2021; 3. "Chicken Adobo" Released: March 19, 2021

1176 is a collaboration album by American rapper Guapdad 4000 in collaboration with Filipino American record producer !llmind. It was released on March 19, 2021, by Twnshp, Roseville, Chester, Paradise Rising, 88rising Records, and 12Tone Music.

On June 11, 2021, they released the deluxe edition of the album, including "How Many (Remix)" featuring Rick Ross.

== Background ==
The album was named after the address of Guapdad 4000's childhood home in West Oakland. It was described as a bridge between Asian and American culture, with Guapdad 4000 spotlighting his Filipino heritage on the album. It is the first album to be released with Paradise Rising, a joint venture with 88rising. In a statement, Guapdad 4000 spoke on the collaboration with !llmind saying "If !llmind had a power it would be to shapeshift, he can do anything. Something like this comes in handy when you need to tell the full spectrum of your story like I did in this music. I had no idea we would stumble upon something this magical though but I guess I should have known that linking up with my Filipino brother would enhance my super powers!"

== Singles ==
The album was supported by two singles before the release: "How Many" on February 12, 2021, and "She Wanna" on March 9, 2021.

== Critical reception ==
Stephen Kearse of Pitchfork wrote that Guapdad 4000 "sinks into a more reflective mood", stating the album "is clearly meant to depart from the seedy hijinks of Guapdad's previous music." Aaron Williams of Uproxx felt that the album "highlights those aspects of his Filipino heritage as he shares some of his most vulnerable and personal material yet."

== Track listing ==
1176 track listing
No.	Title	Producer(s)	Length
1.	"How Many"	!llmind; Spencer Stewart	3:25
2.	"She Wanna" (featuring P-Lo)	Mansa; P-Lo	2:32
3.	"10finity"	James Delgado	1:58
4.	"Big Shot"	!llmind; Al Hug	3:07
5.	"Catching Bodies"	!llmind; Abaz; X-Plosive	2:48
6.	"Chandler"	!llmind; Al Hug	2:33
7.	"Muhammad"	!llmind	2:21
8.	"Touch Dough"	DTB	2:48
9.	"Downgrade"	Don Alfonso	3:43
10.	"Uncle Ricky"	!llmind; Mario Luciano	2:22
11.	"Gargoyles" (featuring Tish Hyman)	!llmind; Kount Koal	3:03
12.	"PlayStation" (featuring Buddy)	!llmind; Shuko; Al Hug	2:38
13.	"Chicken Adobo"	!llmind; Pearl Lion	3:02
14.	"Stoop Kid"	!llmind; Mario Luciano	7:30
Total length:			43:58

Deluxe edition
No.	Title	Producer(s)	Length
15.	"How Many (Remix)" (featuring Rick Ross)	!llmind; Spencer Stewart	3:38
16.	"Justin Bieber"	!llmind; Sucuki; James Delgado	2:48
17.	"Mad Max"	!llmind; Mosaic Music	2:30
18.	"Slumber Party"	!llmind; SlummA Beats	2:17
19.	"Swear to God"	!llmind; Mario Luciano	2:16
20.	"Say It Ain't So"	!llmind; Florianvibes	1:50
Total length:			59:19
