= Street Runner =

2021 single by Rod Wave

Single by Rod Wave

from the album SoulFly
- Released: March 10, 2021
- Length: 4:12
- Label: Alamo
- Songwriters: Rodarius Green; Lukas Payne; Sterling Reynolds; Thomas Horton; Ruth Berhe
- Producers: Karltin Bankz; LondnBlue; TnTXD

Rod Wave singles chronology
"All Week" (2021)	"Street Runner" (2021)	"Tombstone" (2021)

Music video
- "Street Runner" on YouTube

"Street Runner" is a song by American rapper Rod Wave, released on March 10, 2021 as the lead single from his third studio album SoulFly (2021). It was produced by Karltin Bankz, LondnBlue and TnTXD, and samples "Mixed Signals" by Ruth B. The song peaked at number 16 on the Billboard Hot 100.

"Street Runner" inspired the design of a video game of the same name, which Rod Wave launched in a collaboration with Krool Toys to promote the song on March 17, 2021. According to Wave, "Street Runner" is a personal song about the sacrifices I made to pursue this career that I have now. All while never forgetting about the family and loved ones I'm doing it for. This video game brings my story to life beyond the music."

== Composition ==
In the song, Rod Wave reflects on a relationship that he did not have time for, and the "success and chaos" his career has brought him. He sings about having achieved his dreams but still missing someone. The song ends with a voicemail message from a woman "Mallary B." who tells Wave that she loves and misses him.

== Critical reception ==
Erika Marie of HotNewHipHop called the song "an introspective single that shows the rapper is more focused on building his brands than having a good time".

== Music video ==
The music video was released alongside the single, and was directed and shot by Rod Wave, Yawn Rico and Eye 4 Production. It starts with the announcement of the release date of his then-upcoming album SoulFly before showing Wave's life of touring, taking flights, performing concerts, and filming music videos, while missing the woman he likes.

== Charts ==
=== Weekly charts ===
Weekly chart performance for "Street Runner"
Chart (2021)	Peak position
Global 200 (Billboard)	34
New Zealand Hot Singles (RMNZ)	27
US Billboard Hot 100	16
US Hot R&B/Hip-Hop Songs (Billboard)	9

=== Year-end charts ===
Year-end chart performance for "Street Runner"
Chart (2021)	Position
US Hot R&B/Hip-Hop Songs (Billboard)	54

== Certifications ==
Region	Certification	Certified units/sales
United States (RIAA)	4× Platinum	4,000,000^{‡}
^{‡} Sales+streaming figures based on certification alone.
