= Live Life Fast =

Studio album by Roddy Ricch
- Released: December 17, 2021
- Genre: Hip-hop
- Length: 50:47
- Label: Bird Vision; Atlantic
- Producer: Beezo; Ephortless Beats; ZayBans; Louie Montana; Boi-1da; D Keyz; Dez Wright; G Ry; Geronimo; Gylttryp; Hagan; Heavy Mellow; Jasper Harris; Keith Parker; Kenny Beats; LC; Lexx Deathstar; Lil CC; Lucas Padulo; Moneyevery; Mustard; Nils; Rex Kudo; Ronny J; Saint Mino; Seshnolan; Sir Dylan; Sonic; Southside; Tarentino; TM88; Tommy Parker; Wasa; Wheezy; Yakree

Roddy Ricch chronology
Please Excuse Me for Being Antisocial (2019)	Live Life Fast (2021)	The Big 3 (2022)

Singles from Live Life Fast
- 1. "Late at Night" Released: June 4, 2021

Live Life Fast (stylized in all caps) is the second studio album by American rapper Roddy Ricch. It was released on December 17, 2021, through Atlantic Records and Bird Vision Entertainment. The album features guest appearances from Future, Kodak Black, 21 Savage, Takeoff, Jamie Foxx, Ty Dolla Sign, Alex Isley, Fivio Foreign, Lil Baby, Gunna, and Bibi Bourelly. The production was handled by multiple producer, including Wheezy, Boi-1da, Southside, TM88 and Kenny Beats among others.

Live Life Fast was preceded by one single, "Late at Night", which was released on June 4, 2021. The album received generally lukewarm reviews from music critics and received moderate commercial success. It debuted at number four on the US Billboard 200 chart, earning 62,000 album-equivalent units (including 3,500 copies in pure album sales) in its first week.

== Background and promotion ==
In August 2020, Ricch announced that he was working on his second studio album, in which he called it a "masterpiece" and also said that he was waiting for the right time to release it. In September 2021, he posted a screenshot of the album name alongside the number of tracks and its duration through an Instagram story. Ricch also revealed a list of featured artists and some record producers who contribute to the album on December 14, 2021. He announced that fans would get to hear the album early as he would go to different cities and play songs from it. The album's lead and only single, "Late at Night", was previously released on June 4, 2021.

== Critical reception ==
Professional ratings
Aggregate scores
Source	Rating
Metacritic	68/100
Review scores
Source	Rating
AllMusic	3.5/5 stars
Clash	5/10
HipHopDX	2.9/5
NME	4/5 stars
Pitchfork	5.7/10
Rolling Stone	3/5 stars

Live Life Fast received generally lukewarm reviews from music critics. At Metacritic, which assigns a normalized rating out of 100 to reviews from professional publications, the album received an average score of 67, based on six reviews.

== Commercial performance ==
Live Life Fast debuted at number four on the US Billboard 200 chart, earning 62,000 album-equivalent units (including 2,500 copies in pure album sales) in its first week. This album was noticeably not as successful as his debut, his debut studio album Please Excuse Me for Being Antisocial sold 101,000 album-equivalent units (including 3,000 copies in pure album sales) in its first week, Live Life Fast sold more than 40% less units than Ricch's previous album and his previous album was number 1 on the charts, while this was only number 4. This became Roddy Ricch's second US top-ten debut on the chart. The album also accumulated a total of 76.51 million on-demand streams from the album's songs.

== Track listing ==
Live Life Fast track listing
No.	Title	Writer(s)	Producer(s)	Length
1.	"LLF"	Rodrick Moore, Jr.; Masamune Kudo; Everett Romano; Dylan Wiggins; Carlton McDowell, Jr.; Aaron Paris; Brennan Johns; Jake Fridkis; Gabe Goldwash; Charlie Coffeen	Rex Kudo; Heavy Mellow; Sir Dylan; McDowell^{[a]}; Paris^{[a]}; Johns^{[a]}; Fridkis^{[a]}; Goldwash^{[a]}; Coffeen^{[a]}	2:25
2.	"Thailand"	Moore; Joshua Luellen	Southside	3:20
3.	"All Good" (featuring Future)	Moore; Nayvadius Wilburn; Ronald Spence, Jr.; Keith Parker	Ronny J; Parker	3:32
4.	"Rollercoastin"	Moore; Hagan Lange; Eric Sandoval; Luke Clay	Hagan; Sonic; LC	3:05
5.	"Hibachi" (featuring Kodak Black and 21 Savage)	Moore; Bill Kapri; Shayaa Abraham-Joseph; Wesley Glass; Dylan Cleary-Krell	Wheezy; Dez Wright	2:50
6.	"Paid My Dues" (featuring Takeoff)	Moore; Kirshnik Ball; Matthew Samuels; Scotty Coleman	Boi-1da; Coleman	2:42
7.	"Crash the Party"	Moore; Demonte Mallory	D Keyz; Yakree	3:06
8.	"No Way" (featuring Jamie Foxx)	Moore; Eric Bishop; Cleary-Krell	Dez Wright	3:11
9.	"Slow It Down" (featuring Ty Dolla Sign and Alex Isley)	Moore; Tyrone Griffin, Jr.; Alexandra Isley; Parker; Mallory	Parker; D Keyz	0:54
10.	"Man Made"	Moore; Bishop Grinnage	Beezo	3:29
11.	"Murda One" (featuring Fivio Foreign)	Moore; Maxie Ryles III; Kenneth Blume III; Nils Noehden	Kenny Beats; Nils	2:39
12.	"Everything You Need"	Moore; Ryan Martinez; Mino Drerup; Thomas Lumpkins; Geronimo	G Ry; Saint Mino; Tommy Parker; Geronimo	3:27
13.	"Moved to Miami" (featuring Lil Baby)	Moore; Dominique Jones; Bryan Simmons; Lucas Padulo; Alex Cartagena	TM88; Padulo; Lexx Deathstar	3:42
14.	"Don't I" (featuring Gunna)	Moore; Sergio Kitchens; Sandoval; Giuseppe Vasaturo; Ryan O'Neil	Sonic; Wasa; Moneyevery	3:33
15.	"Bibi's Interlude"	Moore; Bibi Bourelly; Romano; Jasper Harris	Heavy Mellow; Harris	0:50
16.	"More Than a Trend"	Moore; Cydney Christine	Lil CC	1:36
17.	"Late at Night"	Moore; Dijon McFarlane; Shah Rukh Zaman Khan	Mustard; GYLTTRYP	2:54
18.	"25 Million"	Moore; Ryan Nolan; Chance Youngblood	Seshnolan; Tarentino	3:24
Total length:				50:47

Notes

- All tracks are stylized in lowercase. For example, "Late at Night" is stylized as "late at night".
- "LLF" features uncredited background vocals from Ty Dolla Sign.
- "Bibi's Interlude" features uncredited vocals from Bibi Bourelly.

== Charts ==
Chart performance for Live Life Fast
Chart (2021)	Peak position
Australian Albums (ARIA)	59
Belgian Albums (Ultratop Flanders)	86
Belgian Albums (Ultratop Wallonia)	197
Canadian Albums (Billboard)	5
Danish Albums (Hitlisten)	32
Dutch Albums (Album Top 100)	26
French Albums (SNEP)	149
Irish Albums (IRMA)	77
Lithuanian Albums (AGATA)	32
New Zealand Albums (RMNZ)	27
Norwegian Albums (VG-lista)	23
Swiss Albums (Schweizer Hitparade)	26
UK Albums (Official Charts)	34
US Billboard 200	4
US Top R&B/Hip-Hop Albums (Billboard)	1
