= Over My Dead Body (song) =

Song by Drake

from the album Take Care
- Released: November 15, 2011
- Recorded: 2011; Sterling Road Studios (Toronto, Ontario); NightBird Recording Studios (West Hollywood, California)
- Genre: Hip hop
- Length: 4:32
- Label: Young Money, Cash Money
- Songwriters: Aubrey Graham, Noah Shebib, Anthony Palman, Chantal Kreviazuk
- Producers: Noah "40" Shebib, Chantal Kreviazuk (co.)

"Over My Dead Body" is a song by Canadian rapper Drake from his second studio album, Take Care (2011). The song serves as the opening track from the album, and was written by Drake, Noah "40" Shebib, Anthony Palman and Canadian singer-songwriter Chantal Kreviazuk; Shebib provided the song's production, with Kreviazuk providing co-production and additional vocals.

== Background ==
In 2010, following the success of his debut studio album Thank Me Later, Drake revealed in an interview with MTV News that his second album would be titled Take Care. He later confirmed he would continue to work extensively with longtime collaborator Noah "40" Shebib, who he wished to handle most of the production as he felt that Thank Me Later's sound had been too disparate, partly due to the large number of producers involved. He also noted in an interview with BBC Radio 1 that Thank Me Later had been "rushed", and that his new album's title of Take Care was partly attributed to the attitude he attempted to maintain whilst recording. The recording sessions for Take Care lasted for four months and largely took place in the city of Toronto, Ontario. During these sessions, Drake requested that Canadian singer-songwriter Chantal Kreviazuk work with him on Take Care and perform on "Over My Dead Body": she described the album's creative process as "beautiful", and commented that she had felt "privileged to have lent my voice and melodic take on his fancy footwork".

== Recording ==
"Over My Dead Body" was written by Drake, Noah "40" Shebib, Anthony Palman and Chantal Kreviazuk, with Shebib providing the song's production. Kreviazuk provided additional vocals, and is also credited as the song's co-producer. Shebib also provided all of the song's instruments, except for additional piano, which was provided by Kreviazuk. "Over My Dead Body" was recorded by Shebib at Sterling Road Studios and NightBird Recording Studios – recording studios in Toronto, Ontario and West Hollywood, California respectively. Mixing was performed by Noel Campbell at Studio 306 in Toronto, with assistant engineering carried out by Noel Cadastre. The song was mastered by Chris Gehringer at Sterling Sound in New York City. The song uses a sample of a remixed version of the song "Sailin' Da South" by American rapper E.S.G.: the remix was made by disc jockey DJ Screw for his 1995 album 3 'n the Mornin', Pt. 1.

== Composition ==
The reason why I am so excited about this song is because I just love this song. I love how Drake is all about Toronto and all about Canada. Amidst all of this stardom, there is such a humility.

— Kreviazuk describing the content of "Over My Dead Body" to 680News.

"Over My Dead Body" is the opening track on Take Care, and lasts for a duration of 4 minutes and thirty-two seconds. Its "poignant" instrumentation is largely piano-driven, and contains influences of R&B and downtempo dance music, although it remains a primarily hip-hop song. Priya Elan of NME described the song as "emo-hop", and compared the backing track to the work of R&B singer and producer Frank Ocean. Writing for PopMatters, David Amidon noticed the use of low-pass filters in the instrumentation, and quipped that they allowed Drake to "[dance] between rapping and alto vocals more nimbly than ever".

Like many of the songs of Take Care, "Over My Dead Body" addresses the struggles that fame and wealth bring. Throughout the song, although Drake boasts about his lifestyle on several occasions, his claims are often "undercut... with a tinge of sadness", in part due to the "poignant pianos and synth streaks" found in the production. The song's opening two couplets find Drake, according to Popdust writer Andrew Unterberger, "taking stock of where he's at" in his career, with the lyrics "I think I killed everybody in the game last year, man / Fuck it I was on though / And I thought I found the girl of my dreams at a strip club / Fuck it I was wrong though". Other lyrics, such as "just performed at a Bar Mitzvah over in the States / used half of the money to beat my brother's case" see him taking on a "defiantly cocky" tone, which Rob Markman of MTV News claimed shows "how his success ultimately supports his people in the struggle". Unterberger interpreted the use of such lyrics as a response to those who had accused Drake of "dwelling too much in self-pity" in the material he had recorded earlier in his career.

Kreviazuk performs the song's chorus, in which she "plaintively" sings the words "they're trying to take you away from me / only over my dead body". Erika Ramirez of Billboard noticed that parts of the song make up a "mounting ode to his competition", highlighting the line "jealousy is just love and hate at the same time" as an example of this. Drake also discusses how taxes detract from his overall earnings; however, he "comforts himself" by surmising that "you lose some, you win some". The candid and open nature to much of "Over My Dead Body" is reminiscent of that found on "Fireworks", the opening track from Thank Me Later which featured vocals from singer Alicia Keys.

== Reception ==
"Over My Dead Body" received generally positive reviews from music critics. Andrew Unterberger of Popdust called the song "a truly widescreen opener" to the album, and complimented Drake's "cockier" lyrics as a "good look for him", although he noted some of these lyrics to be a "little slow-clappy".

== Credits and personnel ==
The credits for "Over My Dead Body" are adapted from the liner notes of Take Care.

Recording

- Recorded at: Sterling Road Studios in Toronto, Ontario and NightBird Recording Studios, West Hollywood, California.

Personnel

- Drake – songwriting, vocals
- Noah "40" Shebib – songwriting, record producer, recording, instruments
- Anthony Palman – songwriting
- Chantal Kreviazuk – songwriting, additional vocals, co-production, additional piano
- Noel Cadastre – assistant engineering
- Noel Campbell – mixing
- Chris Gehringer – mastering

Samples

- Contains elements of "Sailin' Da South", as written and performed by E.S.G. and remixed by DJ Screw.

== Charts ==
Chart (2011)	Peak position
US Bubbling Under Hot 100 (Billboard)	2

== Certifications ==
Region	Certification	Certified units/sales
New Zealand (RMNZ)	Gold	15,000^{‡}
United Kingdom (BPI)	Silver	200,000^{‡}
^{‡} Sales+streaming figures based on certification alone.
