= Tombstone (Rod Wave song) =

2021 single by Rod Wave

Single by Rod Wave

from the album SoulFly
- Released: March 23, 2021
- Length: 2:40
- Label: Alamo
- Songwriters: Rodarius Green; Eric Foley Jr.; Jaylon Howard; Jaidyn Hullum
- Producers: Jai Beats; Saucii; Eighty8

Rod Wave singles chronology
"Street Runner" (2021)	"Tombstone" (2021)	"Richer" (2021)

Music video
- "Tombstone" on YouTube

"Tombstone" is a song by American rapper Rod Wave, released on March 23, 2021 as the second single from his third studio album SoulFly (2021). It was produced by Jai Beats, Saucii and Eighty8. The song features Rod Wave rap-singing and reflecting on his rise to fame, his upbringing, and his desire to be remembered as authentic. It is his highest-charting single, peaking at number 11 on the Billboard Hot 100.

== Background ==
Rod Wave first previewed the song on Instagram Live in November 2020.

== Composition ==
The song is about Rod Wave's rise to fame and life growing up, as well as the consequences of street life. In the chorus, Rod Wave sings about "'lames' that constantly keep his name in their mouths" and his wish to be remembered as one of the "realest" rappers after his death: "And fuck these niggas 'cause they lame / Since they love saying my name / Make sure you write the truest in the motherfucking game / On my tombstone when they bury me / By the river, they will carry me / Finally, I'll be resting in peace".

== Music video ==
The music video was released alongside the single, directed by Reel Goats. It finds Rod Wave alone on a snowy mountain sing-rapping, switching to scenes of a child resembling a younger version of himself, who has a "tumultuous home life" while "still facing systemic issues". The boy watches TV while his father is asleep and his mother at work. Another visual shows him at a "tense dinner" when his father gets abusive. Later, he is seen walking down a "sunny sidewalk", unaware that police have pulled up behind him. The kid gets shot and killed by the police, and it is revealed that he was deaf when he communicates his love for his mother in sign language. The video ends with the kid's father, in a white tunic, laying him down to rest at a riverside, while CGI vines encircle him.

== Live performances ==
Rod Wave performed the song for The Tonight Show Starring Jimmy Fallon, with a trio of singers and a pianist while on the porch alongside a body of water. The video was filmed in Florida.

== Charts ==
=== Weekly charts ===
Weekly chart performance for "Tombstone"
Chart (2021)	Peak position
Global 200 (Billboard)	26
New Zealand Hot Singles (RMNZ)	31
US Billboard Hot 100	11
US Hot R&B/Hip-Hop Songs (Billboard)	5
US Rhythmic Airplay (Billboard)	21

=== Year-end charts ===
Year-end chart performance for "Tombstone"
Chart (2021)	Position
US Billboard Hot 100	98
US Hot R&B/Hip-Hop Songs (Billboard)	38

== Certifications ==
Certifications for "Tombstone"
Region	Certification	Certified units/sales
United States (RIAA)	3× Platinum	3,000,000^{‡}
^{‡} Sales+streaming figures based on certification alone.
