= Bass Persuades (song) =

- Remix cover

Single by Miley Cyrus

from the album Bass Persuades
- Released: September 3, 2026
- Genre: Dance-pop; post-punk
- Length: 3:22
- Label: Atlantic
- Songwriters: Miley Cyrus; Gregory Hein; Kid Harpoon; Michael Pollack
- Producers: Miley Cyrus; Maxx Morando; Michael Pollack; Kid Harpoon

Miley Cyrus singles chronology
"Younger You" (2026)	"Bass Persuades" (2026)

Music video
- "Bass Persuades" on YouTube

"Bass Persuades" is a song by American singer Miley Cyrus. It was released through Atlantic Records on September 3, 2026, as the lead single from her tenth studio album, Bass Persuades (2026). A remix by Model/Actriz was released on September 14, 2026. Commercially, the song has charted within the top 30 in Belgium, Canada, Lebanon, and the Netherlands.

== Composition ==
The song, which has been described as dance-pop and post-punk, is about Cyrus urging her fans to put down their phones and dance. Multiple reviews stated the song had "'80s synths", with NME particularly describing the synths as "throbbing". The song includes multiple references, including "Yeah, chaos is king, but you know that you can't stop, won't stop", which references her 2013 single "We Can't Stop", and a reference to MTV in the line "Glued your eyes to the telephone screen/But you missed the hit without MTV".

== Critical reception ==
Showbiz by PS praised the instrumental, describing it as "a pretty delicious, energetic, short, close-to-the-point synth-pop composition", but gave a more mixed assessment of the lyrics, criticising the conversational nature of the first verse while praising the second verse for "preaching to Gen Z". Melodic writer Reagan Denning said "my jaw hit the floor" and "thankfully, it feels like people are finally starting to wake up to just how talented an artist Miley is". Slant Magazine writer Sal Cinquemani gave the track a positive review, calling it a "gritty dance-pop throwback" that opens with a dirty "80s-coded synth line, throbbing beat, and spoken intro in which the artist wonders rhetorically, "If we ain't moving, baby/Baby, why are we here?".

== Music video ==
The music video for "Bass Persuades" was directed by Mert Alas, and was released alongside the song. It was noted as paying homage to the 1974 Italian erotic film The Night Porter and "leather culture", while also being likened to works by Madonna.

== Commercial performance ==
In the United States, the song became Cyrus' 25th top 40 hit, debuting at number 35 on the Billboard Hot 100. In its second week on the chart, it fell to number 63. In its third week on the chart, coinciding with the release of the album, the song charted at number 52, before falling to number 72 in its fourth week. It also reached number two on the Hot Dance/Pop Songs chart. In the United Kingdom, the song reached number 31 on the UK Singles Chart. Elsewhere, it peaked within the top twenty in Canada, and Flanders, and the top forty in Austria, the Netherlands, and on the Billboard Global 200.

== Personnel ==
The credits were adapted from Tidal.

- Miley Cyrus – lead vocals, composer, producer
- Kid Harpoon – composer, producer, background vocals, bass, drum programming, electric guitar, percussion, synthesizer
- Michael Pollack – producer, background vocals, synthesizer
- Maxx Morando – producer, guitar, synthesizer
- Gregory Hein – composer
- Aaron Shapiro – bass, programming, synthesizer
- Jack Wetmore – guitar
- James King – saxophone
- Ruben Radlauer – percussion
- Brian Rajaratnam – engineering
- Liam Hebb – engineering
- Mark "Spike" Stent – mix engineer
- Kieran Scott – assistant mix engineer
- Randy Merrill – mastering engineer
- Lullah Hull – hand clap
- Fox Myles-Hull – hand clap
- Sonya Savitch-Kleiner – hand clap

== Charts ==
=== Weekly charts ===
Weekly chart performance
Chart (2026)	Peak position
Argentina Hot 100 (Billboard)	46
Argentina Airplay (Monitor Latino)	8
Australia (ARIA)	61
Australia Airplay (RCS)	8
Austria (Ö3 Austria Top 40)	38
Austria Airplay (MusicTrace)	11
Belarus Airplay (TopHit)	8
Belgium (Ultratop 50 Flanders)	19
Belgium (Ultratop 50 Wallonia)	9
Bolivia Airplay (Monitor Latino)	12
Brazil Airplay (Top 100 Brasil)	92
Bulgaria Airplay (PROPHON)	4
Canada Hot 100 (Billboard)	20
Canada AC (Billboard)	11
Canada CHR/Top 40 (Billboard)	11
Canada Hot AC (Billboard)	16
Central America Anglo Airplay (Monitor Latino)	6
Chile Anglo Airplay (Monitor Latino)	7
CIS Airplay (TopHit)	5
Costa Rica Anglo Airplay (Monitor Latino)	12
Croatia International Airplay (Top lista)	2
Czech Republic Airplay (ČNS IFPI)	1
Ecuador Anglo Airplay (Monitor Latino)	4
El Salvador Anglo Airplay (Monitor Latino)	9
Estonia Airplay (TopHit)	5
France Airplay (SNEP)	16
Germany (GfK)	55
Germany Airplay (MusicTrace)	4
Global 200 (Billboard)	39
Greece International (IFPI)	35
Hungary (Editors' Choice Top 40)	10
Ireland (IRMA)	44
Israel International Airplay (Media Forest)	11
Israel TV Airplay (Media Forest)	4
Italy Airplay (EarOne)	1
Japan Hot Overseas (Billboard Japan)	4
Kazakhstan Airplay (TopHit)	21
Latin America Anglo Airplay (Monitor Latino)	8
Latvia Airplay (LaIPA)	2
Lebanon (Lebanese Top 20)	13
Lithuania Airplay (TopHit)	4
Malta Airplay (Radiomonitor)	9
Mexico Anglo Airplay (Monitor Latino)	2
Moldova Airplay (TopHit)	17
Netherlands (Dutch Top 40)	30
Netherlands (Single Tip)	6
New Zealand Hot Singles (RMNZ)	3
Nicaragua Anglo Airplay (Monitor Latino)	1
North Macedonia Airplay (Radiomonitor)	10
Panama International (PRODUCE)	50
Panama Airplay (Monitor Latino)	17
Paraguay Anglo Airplay (Monitor Latino)	5
Poland Airplay (OLiS)	27
Poland Streaming (OLiS)	87
Portugal (AFP)	81
Puerto Rico Anglo Airplay (Monitor Latino)	8
Romania Airplay (TopHit)	38
Russia Airplay (TopHit)	8
San Marino Airplay (SMRTV Top 50)	1
Serbia Airplay (Radiomonitor)	2
Slovakia Airplay (ČNS IFPI)	10
Slovenia Airplay (Radiomonitor)	6
South Africa Airplay (TOSAC)	6
Spain (Promusicae)	97
Spain Airplay (Promusicae)	9
Sweden Heatseeker (Sverigetopplistan)	8
Switzerland (Schweizer Hitparade)	50
Switzerland Airplay (MusicTrace)	22
Ukraine Airplay (TopHit)	65
UK Singles (Official Charts)	31
Uruguay Anglo Airplay (Monitor Latino)	2
US Billboard Hot 100	35
US Adult Pop Airplay (Billboard)	23
US Dance Airplay (Billboard)	16
US Hot Dance/Pop Songs (Billboard)	2
US Pop Airplay (Billboard)	19
Venezuela Anglo Airplay (Monitor Latino)	3

=== Monthly charts ===
Monthly chart performance
Chart (2026)	Peak position
Belarus Airplay (TopHit)	21
CIS Airplay (TopHit)	9
Estonia Airplay (TopHit)	7
Kazakhstan Airplay (TopHit)	47
Latvia Airplay (TopHit)	6
Lithuania Airplay (TopHit)	5
Moldova Airplay (TopHit)	48
Romania Airplay (TopHit)	55
Russia Airplay (TopHit)	13
Ukraine Airplay (TopHit)	69

== Release history ==
Release history
Region	Date	Format(s)	Version	Label	Ref.
Various	September 3, 2026	Digital download; streaming	Original	Atlantic	
Italy	September 4, 2026	Radio airplay	Original	Warner	
United States	September 8, 2026	Contemporary hit radio	Original	Atlantic	
Various	September 14, 2026	Digital download; streaming	Remixx	Atlantic	
