= Bass Persuades =

- Standard cover

Studio album by Miley Cyrus
- Released: September 18, 2026
- Genres: Electropop; pop rock
- Length: 37:41
- Label: Atlantic
- Producers: Aldae; Griff Clawson; Miley Cyrus; Kid Harpoon; Maxx Morando; Michael Pollack; Model/Actriz; the Monsters & Strangerz

Miley Cyrus chronology
| Something Beautiful (2025) | Bass Persuades (2026) |

Singles from Bass Persuades
- 1. "Bass Persuades" Released: September 3, 2026

Bass Persuades is the tenth studio album by the American singer Miley Cyrus, and her first album promoted under the mononym Miley. It was released on September 18, 2026, through Atlantic Records. The album's title track was released as the lead single on September 3.

Bass Persuades received generally positive reviews from music critics, who complimented Cyrus's vocals but also felt the album was rushed and safe. In the United States, Bass Persuades topped the Billboard 200 and became Cyrus's sixth number-one album on the chart. Elsewhere, the album charted at number one in Croatia and Belgium (Wallonia), while reaching the top ten in Australia, Austria, Canada, Denmark, Belgium (Flanders), Germany, Hungary, Italy, the Netherlands, New Zealand, Portugal, Scotland, Spain, and Switzerland.

== Background ==
In June 2025, shortly after the release of her ninth studio album, Something Beautiful, Cyrus revealed that she had already selected twelve songs for her follow-up studio effort and arranged them in her intended tracklist order on a private Spotify playlist. She attributed her tendency to move quickly between projects to her frustration with lengthy album rollouts. On July 27, 2026, Cyrus discussed her then-upcoming tenth studio album, describing it as reflective of her relationship with her fiancé, Maxx Morando, while also exploring themes of self-love. She described the album as a "love story" with multiple layers, including a "romantic thread" running throughout it. Cyrus called the project "especially meaningful" to her, noting that the feelings she experienced during its conception remained with her across multiple eras. The same day, it was reported that she signed with Atlantic Records, marking her departure from Columbia Records.

== Release and promotion ==
On August 31, 2026, Cyrus posted a photo in social media, teasing a new musical project, and adopted the mononym Miley for her public and artistic identity. On September 1, she announced Bass Persuades as her tenth studio album, revealing its September 18 release date. In announcing the album, she explained the title as encompassing "heart full, heartache, every part of life in between". Alongside the announcement, she released a teaser clip featuring her playing an electric guitar while wearing a white jumpsuit, accompanied by a "gritty, thrashing instrumental". She promoted the album with a two-night engagement at the Hollywood Bowl in Los Angeles, with American band Model/Actriz serving as the opening act, on October 16 and 18.

The album's title track was released as the lead single, alongside its music video, on September 3, 2026. It has reached number 39 on the Billboard Global 200, number 35 on the Billboard Hot 100, and number 31 on the UK singles chart.

The music video for "Let's Get Married" was released on September 18, 2026. 12 days later, the music video for "Different Religion" followed, which featured the band Model/Actriz.

== Critical reception ==
Professional ratings
Aggregate scores
| Source | Rating |
|---|---|
| AnyDecentMusic? | 5.8/10 |
| Metacritic | 63/100 |
Review scores
| Source | Rating |
| AllMusic | 3/5 stars |
| Consequence | B– |
| The Line of Best Fit | 7/10 |
| MusicOMH | 3/5 stars |
| NME | 3/5 stars |
| Paste | C+ |
| Pitchfork | 5.3/10 |
| Rolling Stone | 3.5/5 stars |
| Slant Magazine | 2.5/5 stars |
| The Times | 4/5 stars |

According to the review aggregator Metacritic, Bass Persuades received "generally favorable reviews" based on a weighted average score of 63 out of 100 from ten critic scores. AnyDecentMusic? gave the album a score of 5.8 out of 10 based on eleven reviews.

Upon its release, Bass Persuades received a four-out-of-five star review from The Times' Victoria Segal. Riff Magazine reporter Mike DeWald noted that while album's strengths outweighed its weaknesses, its finished product had mixed results. Michael Savio of Slant Magazine agreed with DeWald's opinion, noting that the album failed to live up to its title. He further mentioned its unpersuasion with both its theme and aesthetic. Variety's Chris Willman was disappointed in the album's finished product, following the title track's release performing what he called a "classic act of misdirection".

In his review for Eulalie Magazine, Tim Hussey opined that Bass Persuades was safe in comparison to its predecessor, 2025's Something Beautiful. He further noted issues with the sequential order of the songs, specifically naming the first three of the album, the title track, "Different Religion", and "Orbit", which he believed "promptly changes course" of the album. Eliot Odgers of Still Listening expressed his disappointment in the release, describing it as both inconsistent and rushed. MusicOMH's Oliver Evans described the album as both intriguing and muddled. He further made comparison to the reinventions Cyrus pursued with the releases of Can't Be Tamed (2010) and Bangerz (2013); however, felt the reinvention with Bass Persuades was "more purposeful and mature".

== Commercial performance ==
Bass Persuades debuted atop the US Billboard 200 with 61,000 album-equivalent units, which consisted of 47,000 copies sold and 14,000 streaming-equivalent units. This became Cyrus's sixth overall entry to reach number one on the chart, and first to do so since Bangerz in 2013. In its second week, the album fell to number 157 on the Billboard 200, marking a record for the biggest drop for an album by a female artist that debuted at number one in the chart's history, and the second overall.

In the United Kingdom, it debuted at number thirteen on the UK Albums Chart, marking Cyrus's lowest chart debut since the 2019 EP She Is Coming, which peaked at number 18. In Australia, the album peaked at number two on the ARIA Albums Chart, becoming Cyrus's ninth top-ten debut.

== Track listing ==
Standard track listing
| No. | Title | Writer(s) | Producer(s) | Length |
|---|---|---|---|---|
| 1. | "Bass Persuades" | Miley Cyrus; Gregory "Aldae" Hein; Kid Harpoon; Michael Pollack | Cyrus; Harpoon; Pollack; Maxx Morando | 3:22 |
| 2. | "Different Religion" (featuring Model/Actriz) | Cyrus; Aaron Shapiro; Cole Haden; Harpoon; Pollack; Jack Wetmore; Ruben Radlauer | Model/Actriz; Cyrus; Harpoon | 3:43 |
| 3. | "Let's Get Married" | Cyrus; Pollack; Jordan Johnson; Stefan Johnson; Hein | Cyrus; Pollack; the Monsters & Strangerz; Harpoon; Aldae | 3:36 |
| 4. | "Orbit" | Cyrus; Pollack; J. Johnson; S. Johnson | Cyrus; Pollack; the Monsters & Strangerz; Griff Clawson | 3:55 |
| 5. | "Aftermath" | Cyrus; Pollack; Clawson; J. Johnson; S. Johnson; Morando | Cyrus; Pollack; Morando; the Monsters & Strangerz; Harpoon | 3:31 |
| 6. | "Redlights" | Cyrus; Pollack | Cyrus; Harpoon; Morando | 3:42 |
| 7. | "Neon Signs" (featuring Andrew Wyatt of Miike Snow) | Cyrus; Harpoon; Pollack | Cyrus; Harpoon; Pollack | 4:13 |
| 8. | "Innocent Ways" | Cyrus; Morando | Cyrus; Harpoon; Morando | 3:51 |
| 9. | "Snow" | Cyrus; Harpoon; Pollack; Hein; Haden; Wetmore; Shapiro; Radlauer | Cyrus; Harpoon; Pollack; Morando | 4:12 |
| 10. | "Bass Persuades Remixx" (with Model/Actriz) | Cyrus; Shapiro; Hein; Harpoon; Pollack | Cyrus; Harpoon; Pollack; Morando | 3:36 |
| Total length: | | | | 37:41 |

Special vinyl and limited iTunes Store edition bonus track
| No. | Title | Writer(s) | Producer(s) | Length |
|---|---|---|---|---|
| 11. | "Smile" | Cyrus; Hein; Harpoon; Pollack | Cyrus; Harpoon; Pollack; Morando |

=== Notes ===
- The track "Redlights" is stylized in all caps.

== Personnel ==
Credits are adapted from Tidal.

=== Musicians ===
- Miley Cyrus – vocals
- Kid Harpoon – synthesizer (tracks 1–3, 5–10), electric guitar (tracks 1, 3, 5, 7, 10), bass guitar (tracks 1, 3, 6–8), percussion (tracks 1, 3, 6), drum programming (tracks 1, 5–9), background vocals (track 1), piano (tracks 3, 6), acoustic guitar (tracks 3, 7, 9), drums (track 6), guitars (track 8), synth bass (track 10)
- Aaron Shapiro – bass guitar (tracks 1, 2, 4, 5, 9), synthesizer (tracks 1, 2, 10), programming (tracks 1, 2), drum programming (tracks 2, 10)
- Jack Wetmore – guitars (tracks 1, 4, 5), electric guitar (tracks 2, 9); programming, synthesizer (track 2)
- Ruben Radlauer – percussion (tracks 1, 2, 9), drums (tracks 2, 4, 5, 9)
- Maxx Morando – synthesizer (tracks 1, 2, 5, 6, 8, 9), guitars (tracks 1, 5), drum programming (tracks 5, 6, 8), drums (track 7), bass guitar (track 8)
- Michael Pollack – background vocals, synthesizer (track 1); bass Moog, dulcimer, piano, Wurlitzer (track 4)
- Fox Myles-Hull – hand claps (track 1)
- Lullah Hull – hand claps (track 1)
- Sonya Sabitch-Kleiner – hand claps (track 1)
- Cole Haden – vocals (track 2)
- Franco Reid – drums, percussion (tracks 3, 7)
- The Monsters & Strangerz – electric guitar, synthesizer (track 3)
- Griff Clawson – electric guitar, guitars, Mellotron, synthesizer (track 4)
- George Doering – bass guitar, electric guitar, guitars (track 4)
- Jordan Johnson – bass Moog (track 4)
- Sara Kawai – harp (track 4)
- Wayne Coyne – additional vocals (track 5)
- Davide Rossi – strings arrangement (track 6)
- Andrew Wyatt – vocals, drums, Farfisa organ, piano, synth bass (track 7)

=== Technical ===
- Liam Hebb – engineering (tracks 1–7, 9, 10), additional engineering (track 8)
- Brian Rajaratnam – engineering (tracks 1, 7–10), additional engineering (tracks 2, 5)
- Jordan Johnson – engineering (track 3–6)
- Stefan Johnson – engineering (track 3–6)
- Brady Wortzel – engineering (track 3, 5), engineering assistance (track 4)
- Christopher Burks – engineering (tracks 4–5)
- Jaime Sikora – engineering (track 4)
- Noah "Mailbox" Passovoy – engineering (track 4)
- Andrew Wyatt – engineering (track 7)
- Maxx Morando – engineering (track 8)
- Nathan Feler – engineering assistance (tracks 1, 3)
- Mark "Spike" Stent – mixing (tracks 1–2, 7–8, 10)
- Dave Fridmann – mixing (tracks 3–5)
- Shawn Everett – mixing (tracks 6, 9)
- Kieran Scott – mixing assistance (tracks 1–2, 7–8, 10)
- Randy Merrill – mastering
- Jon Fridmann – immersive mixing, immersive mastering

== Charts ==
=== Weekly charts ===
Weekly chart performance
| Chart (2026) | Peak position |
|---|---|
| Australian Albums (ARIA) | 2 |
| Austrian Albums (Ö3 Austria) | 2 |
| Belgian Albums (Ultratop Flanders) | 4 |
| Belgian Albums (Ultratop Wallonia) | 1 |
| Canadian Albums (Billboard) | 7 |
| Croatian International Albums (HDU) | 1 |
| Danish Vinyl Albums (Hitlisten) | 8 |
| Dutch Albums (Album Top 100) | 7 |
| Finnish Albums (Suomen virallinen lista) | 25 |
| French Albums (SNEP) | 20 |
| German Albums (Offizielle Top 100) | 4 |
| German Pop Albums (Offizielle Top 100) | 1 |
| Greek Albums (IFPI) | 6 |
| Hungarian Albums (MAHASZ) | 2 |
| Irish Albums (Official Charts) | 50 |
| Italian Albums (FIMI) | 10 |
| Japanese Download Albums (Billboard Japan) | 76 |
| Lithuanian Albums (AGATA) | 48 |
| New Zealand Albums (RMNZ) | 4 |
| Norwegian Albums (IFPI Norge) | 35 |
| Polish Albums (ZPAV) | 13 |
| Portuguese Albums (AFP) | 8 |
| Scottish Albums (Official Charts) | 7 |
| Spanish Albums (Promusicae) | 3 |
| Swedish Albums (Sverigetopplistan) | 24 |
| Swiss Albums (Schweizer Hitparade) | 3 |
| UK Albums (Official Charts) | 13 |
| US Billboard 200 | 1 |
| US Top Dance Albums (Billboard) | 1 |

=== Monthly charts ===
Monthly chart performance
| Chart (2026) | Position |
|---|---|
| Croatian International Vinyl Albums (HDU) | 3 |

== Release history ==
Release dates and formats
| Date | Formats | Editions | Labels | Ref. |
|---|---|---|---|---|
| September 18, 2026 | Cassette; CD; download; LP; streaming | Standard | Atlantic | |
| September 18, 2026 | CD; download; LP | The Miley Edition (Note: The Miley Edition was released physically, via retailer JB Hi-Fi, as an Australian exclusive edition.) | Atlantic | |

== See also ==
- List of Billboard 200 number-one albums of 2026
- List of Top Album Sales number ones of the 2020s
- List of Billboard 200 number-one albums of the 2020s
- List of Billboard number-one dance albums of 2026
- List of number-one albums of 2026 (Belgium)
