= Pirouette (disambiguation) =

A pirouette is a type of dance turn.

Pirouette may also refer to:

- Pirouette (cookie), a type of rolled wafer
- Pirouette (dressage), an equestrian movement
- Pirouette (mouthpiece), a component of some music instruments
- Pirouette, a type of maneuver in playboating
- Pirouette: Turning Points in Design, exhibition at the Museum of Modern Art

== Music ==
- Pirouette (2hollis album), an upcoming album by 2hollis
- Pirouette (Model/Actriz album), a 2025 album by the band Model/Actriz
- "Pirouette" (song), by A Loss for Words
