= Dogsbody =

Dogsbody may refer to:

- Dogsbody (album), a 2023 album by Model/Actriz
- Dogsbody (novel), a 1975 children's novel by Diana Wynne Jones
