= List of Ultratop 50 number-one singles of 2026 =

These songs topped the Ultratop 50 in 2026.

Number-one singles of 2026 in Flanders
Flanders
Issue date	Song	Artist	Ref.
3 January	"The Fate of Ophelia"	Taylor Swift	
10 January	"Man I Need"	Olivia Dean	
17 January	"The Fate of Ophelia"	Taylor Swift	
24 January	"I Just Might"	Bruno Mars	
31 January	"I Just Might"	Bruno Mars	
7 February	"I Just Might"	Bruno Mars	
14 February	"I Just Might"	Bruno Mars	
21 February	"I Just Might"	Bruno Mars	
28 February	"I Just Might"	Bruno Mars	
7 March	"I Just Might"	Bruno Mars	
14 March	"I Just Might"	Bruno Mars	
21 March	"I Just Might"	Bruno Mars	
28 March	"I Just Might"	Bruno Mars	
4 April	"I Just Might"	Bruno Mars	
11 April	"I Just Might"	Bruno Mars	
18 April	"So Easy (To Fall in Love)"	Olivia Dean	
25 April	"Fever Dream"	Alex Warren	
2 May	"I Just Might"	Bruno Mars	
9 May	"Fever Dream"	Alex Warren	
16 May	"So Easy (To Fall in Love)"	Olivia Dean	
23 May	"So Easy (To Fall in Love)"	Olivia Dean	
30 May	"Fever Dream"	Alex Warren	
6 June	"Fever Dream"	Alex Warren	
13 June	"Homewrecker"	Sombr	
20 June	"I Knew It, I Knew You"	Taylor Swift	
27 June	"Fever Dream"	Alex Warren	
4 July	"Dai Dai"	Shakira and Burna Boy	
11 July	"Dai Dai"	Shakira and Burna Boy	
18 July	"Dai Dai"	Shakira and Burna Boy	
25 July	"Dai Dai"	Shakira and Burna Boy	
1 August	"Dai Dai"	Shakira and Burna Boy	
8 August	"Dai Dai"	Shakira and Burna Boy	
15 August	"Dai Dai"	Shakira and Burna Boy	
22 August	"Dai Dai"	Shakira and Burna Boy	
29 August	"Dai Dai"	Shakira and Burna Boy	
5 September	"Dai Dai"	Shakira and Burna Boy	
12 September	"My Body Isn't Ready"	Sombr	
19 September	"Dai Dai"	Shakira and Burna Boy	
26 September	"Boston"	Stella Lefty	
3 October	"My Body Isn't Ready"	Sombr	
10 October	"My Body Isn't Ready"	Sombr	
17 October	"My Body Isn't Ready"	Sombr	
24 October	"My Body Isn't Ready"	Sombr	
31 October	"My Body Isn't Ready"	Sombr	
7 November	"Babydoll"	Jamie Miller	
14 November	"Babydoll"	Jamie Miller	
21 November	"My Body Isn't Ready"	Sombr	

Number-one singles of 2026 in Wallonia
Wallonia
Issue date	Song	Artist	Ref.
3 January	"Melodrama"	Disiz and Theodora	
10 January	"Melodrama"	Disiz and Theodora	
17 January	"Melodrama"	Disiz and Theodora	
24 January	"Melodrama"	Disiz and Theodora	
31 January	"Melodrama"	Disiz and Theodora	
7 February	"Melodrama"	Disiz and Theodora	
14 February	"Gabriela"	Katseye	
21 February	"Melodrama"	Disiz and Theodora	
28 February	"Melodrama"	Disiz and Theodora	
7 March	"What You Want"	Angèle featuring Justice	
14 March	"I Just Might"	Bruno Mars	
21 March	"I Just Might"	Bruno Mars	
28 March	"I Just Might"	Bruno Mars	
4 April	"What You Want"	Angèle featuring Justice	
11 April	"I Just Might"	Bruno Mars	
18 April	"What You Want"	Angèle featuring Justice	
25 April	"I Just Might"	Bruno Mars	
2 May	"I Just Might"	Bruno Mars	
9 May	"What You Want"	Angèle featuring Justice	
16 May	"What You Want"	Angèle featuring Justice	
23 May	"What You Want"	Angèle featuring Justice	
30 May	"What You Want"	Angèle featuring Justice	
6 June	"What You Want"	Angèle featuring Justice	
13 June	"What You Want"	Angèle featuring Justice	
20 June	"Dracula"	Tame Impala	
27 June	"Dai Dai"	Shakira and Burna Boy	
4 July	"Dai Dai"	Shakira and Burna Boy	
11 July	"Dai Dai"	Shakira and Burna Boy	
18 July	"Dai Dai"	Shakira and Burna Boy	
25 July	"Dai Dai"	Shakira and Burna Boy	
1 August	"Dai Dai"	Shakira and Burna Boy	
8 August	"Dai Dai"	Shakira and Burna Boy	
15 August	"Dai Dai"	Shakira and Burna Boy	
22 August	"Dai Dai"	Shakira and Burna Boy	
29 August	"Des fleurs"	Stromae and Tove Lo	
5 September	"Des fleurs"	Stromae and Tove Lo	
12 September	"Chaussures roses"	TeddyBear	
19 September	"Des fleurs"	Stromae and Tove Lo	
26 September	"Chaussures roses"	TeddyBear	
3 October	"Chaussures roses"	TeddyBear	
10 October	"Chaussures roses"	TeddyBear	
17 October	"Mi Chico"	DJ Goja	
24 October	"Une seule vie"	Angèle	
31 October	"Une seule vie"	Angèle	
7 November	"Chaussures roses"	TeddyBear	
14 November	"Chaussures roses"	TeddyBear	
21 November	"Babydoll"	Jamie Miller	

Flanders ranking of most weeks at number 1
Position	Artist	Weeks #1
1	Bruno Mars	13
2	Shakira	11
2	Burna Boy	11
3	Sombr	8
4	Alex Warren	5
5	Olivia Dean	4
6	Taylor Swift	3
7	Jamie Miller	2
8	Stella Lefty	1

Wallonia ranking of most weeks at number 1
Position	Artist	Weeks #1
1	Angèle	11
2	Justice	9
2	Shakira	9
2	Burna Boy	9
3	Disiz	8
3	Theodora	8
4	Bruno Mars	6
4	TeddyBear	6
5	Stromae	3
5	Tove Lo	3
6	Katseye	1
6	Tame Impala	1
6	DJ Goja	1
6	Jamie Miller	1

== See also ==
- List of number-one albums of 2026 (Belgium)
- 2026 in music
