= List of Billboard 200 number-one albums of 2021 =

This is a list of the albums ranked number one in the United States during 2021. The top-performing albums and EPs in the U.S. are ranked on the Billboard 200 chart, which is published by Billboard magazine. The data is compiled by Nielsen SoundScan based on multi-metric consumption as measured in album-equivalent units, which comprise album sales, track sales, and streams on digital music platforms. Each unit equals one album sold, or 10 individual digital tracks sold from an album, or 3,750 ad-supported or 1,250 paid/subscription on-demand official audio and video streams generated by songs from an album.

30, the fourth studio album by English singer-songwriter Adele, was the best-selling album of 2021, with 1.464 million copies sold. It garnered the biggest opening week of 2021 with 839,000 album-equivalent units, and topped the chart for the final four weeks of the year. Dangerous: The Double Album by American country singer Morgan Wallen was the best-performing album of 2021 and the longest running number-one album of the year, having topped the Billboard 200 for 10 consecutive weeks. It became the first country album since The Chase (1992) by American singer Garth Brooks to reign the Billboard 200 for six or more weeks, and the first album since Whitney (1987) by American singer Whitney Houston, to spend its first 10 weeks at the top spot.

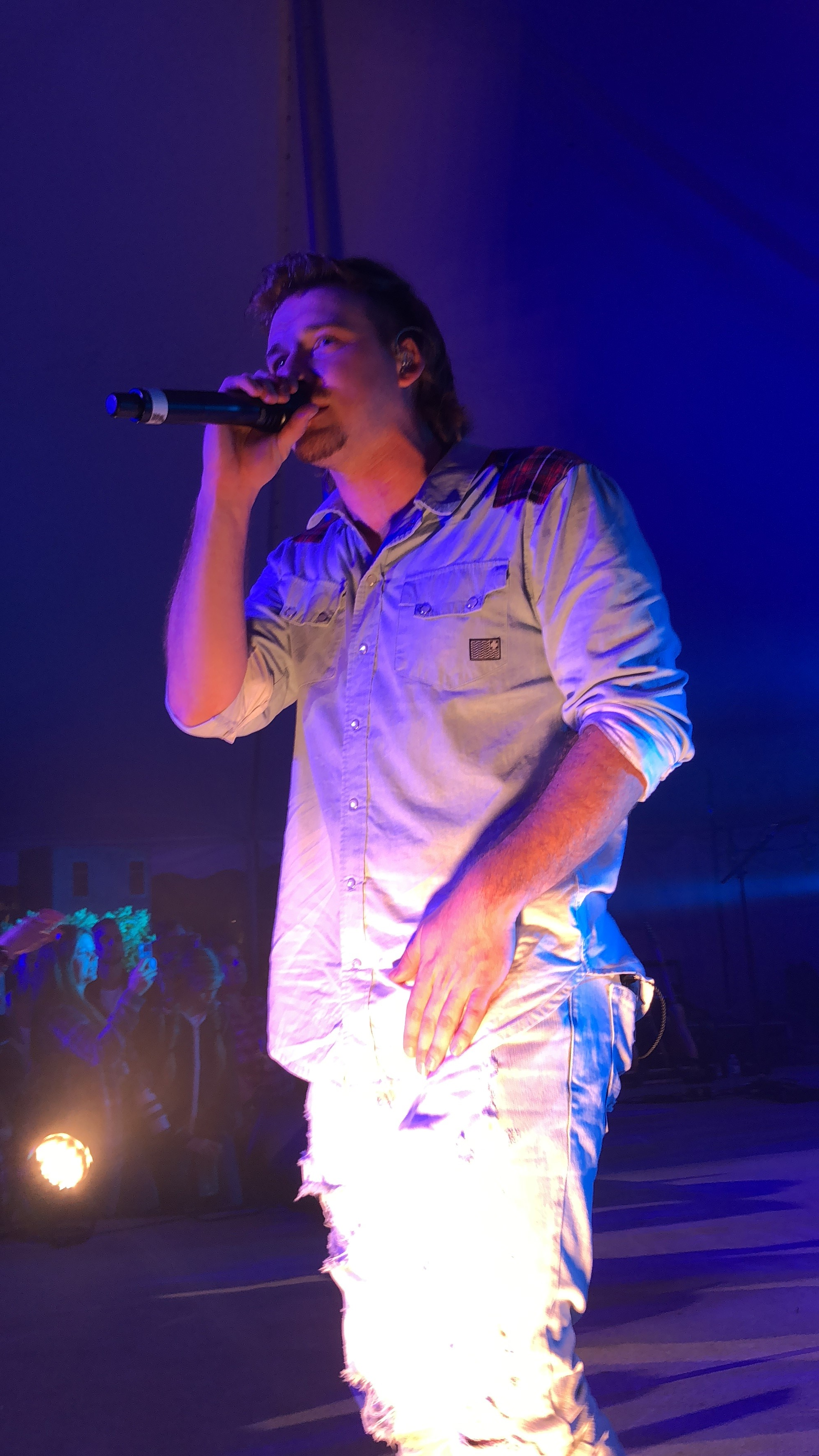
Dangerous: The Double Album by American singer Morgan Wallen became the first album since 1987 to spend its first 10 weeks atop the Billboard 200.

American singer-songwriter Taylor Swift charted three number one albums this year—the most for any artist: her 2020 studio album Evermore and 2021 re-recordings Fearless (Taylor's Version) and Red (Taylor's Version); they collectively spent six weeks atop the Billboard 200. Fearless (Taylor's Version) became the first re-recorded album in history to top the chart. American singer-songwriter Olivia Rodrigo's debut studio album, Sour, is the year's second longest reigning number-one album of the Billboard 200 and the longest-reigning by a female artist, with five non-consecutive weeks spent atop the chart.

== Chart history ==
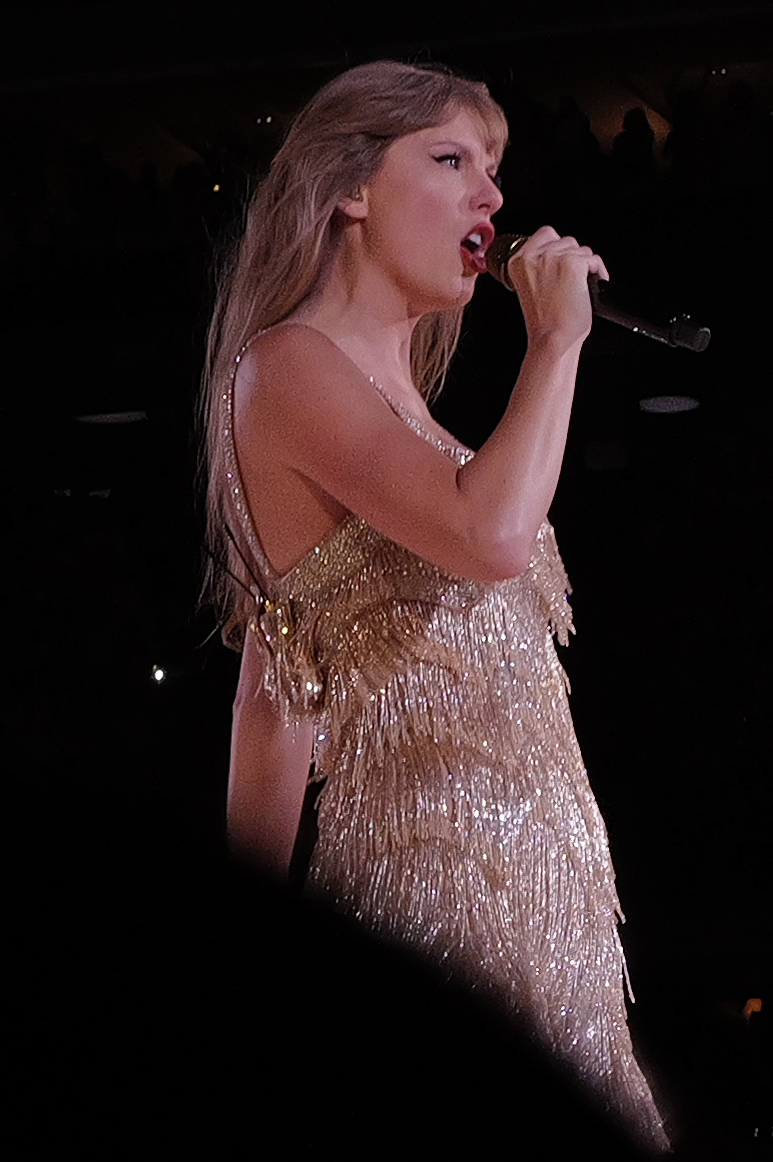
Taylor Swift topped the chart for six weeks with three number-ones: her ninth studio album Evermore, and the re-recordings Fearless (Taylor's Version) and Red (Taylor's Version).

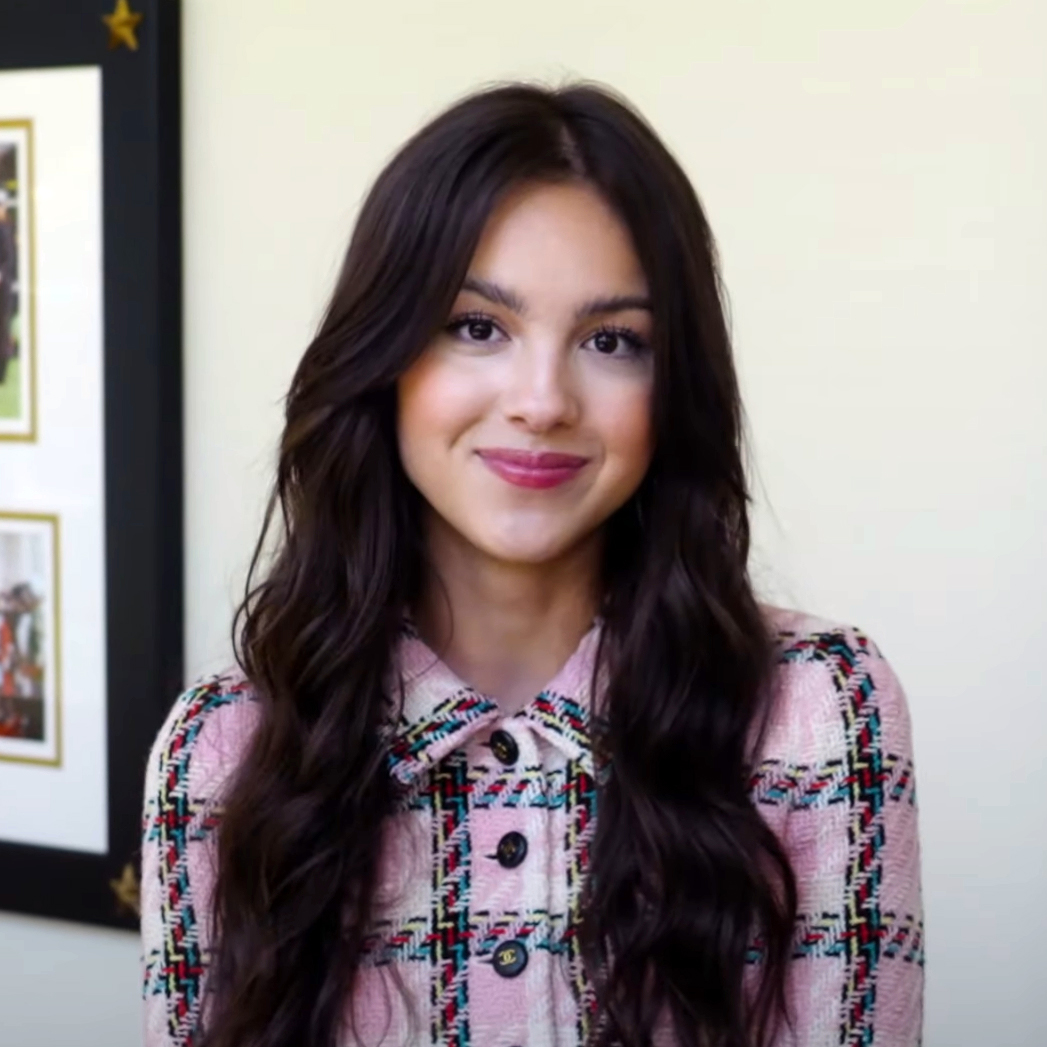
Olivia Rodrigo's debut studio album, Sour, spent five weeks atop the chart, becoming the longest running number-one album by a female artist in 2021.

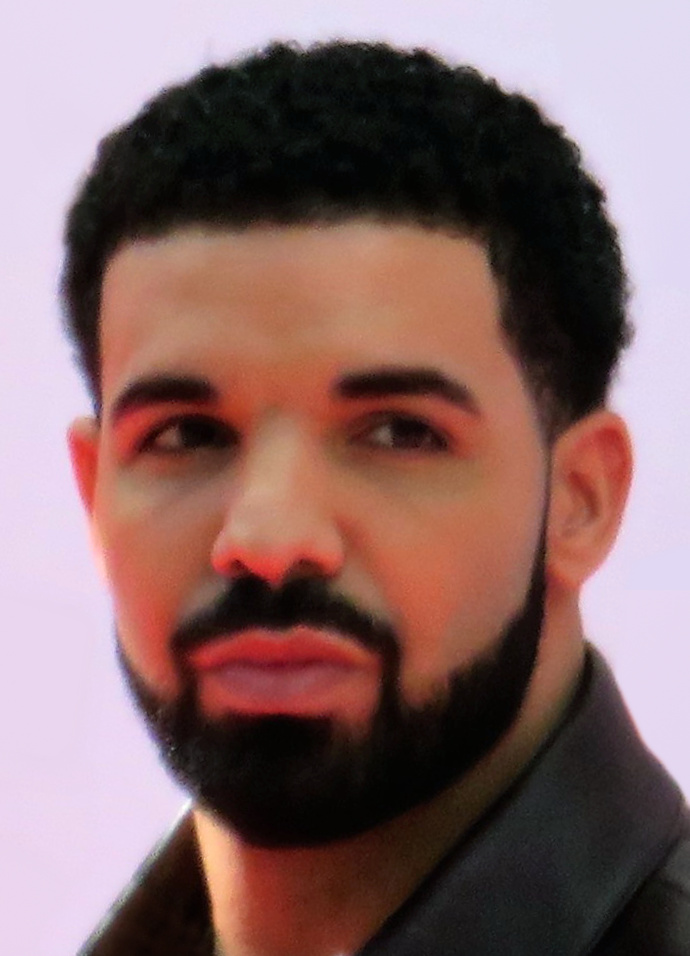
Drake's sixth studio album, Certified Lover Boy, spent five weeks atop the chart.

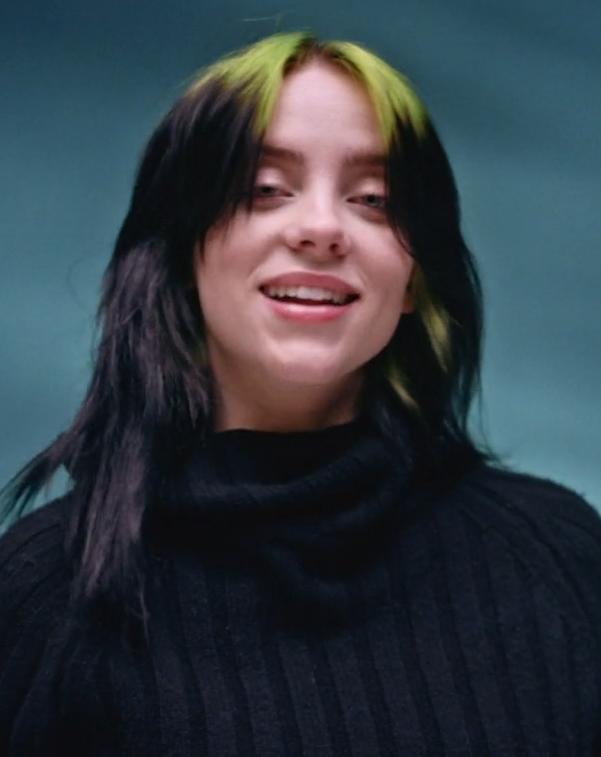
Happier Than Ever, the second studio album from Billie Eilish, topped the chart for three consecutive weeks.

Key
| † | Indicates best-performing album of 2021 |

| Issue date | Album | Artist(s) | Album- equivalent units | Ref. |
|---|---|---|---|---|
| January 2 | Evermore | Taylor Swift | 169,000 | |
| January 9 | Whole Lotta Red | Playboi Carti | 100,000 | |
| January 16 | Evermore | Taylor Swift | 56,000 | |
| January 23 | Dangerous: The Double Album † | Morgan Wallen | 265,000 | |
| January 30 | Dangerous: The Double Album † | Morgan Wallen | 159,000 | |
| February 6 | Dangerous: The Double Album † | Morgan Wallen | 130,000 | |
| February 13 | Dangerous: The Double Album † | Morgan Wallen | 149,000 | |
| February 20 | Dangerous: The Double Album † | Morgan Wallen | 150,000 | |
| February 27 | Dangerous: The Double Album † | Morgan Wallen | 93,000 | |
| March 6 | Dangerous: The Double Album † | Morgan Wallen | 89,000 | |
| March 13 | Dangerous: The Double Album † | Morgan Wallen | 82,000 | |
| March 20 | Dangerous: The Double Album † | Morgan Wallen | 78,000 | |
| March 27 | Dangerous: The Double Album † | Morgan Wallen | 69,000 | |
| April 3 | Justice | Justin Bieber | 154,000 | |
| April 10 | SoulFly | Rod Wave | 130,000 | |
| April 17 | Justice | Justin Bieber | 75,000 | |
| April 24 | Fearless (Taylor's Version) | Taylor Swift | 291,000 | |
| May 1 | Slime Language 2 | Young Thug and various artists | 113,000 | |
| May 8 | A Gangsta's Pain | Moneybagg Yo | 110,000 | |
| May 15 | Khaled Khaled | DJ Khaled | 94,000 | |
| May 22 | A Gangsta's Pain | Moneybagg Yo | 61,000 | |
| May 29 | The Off-Season | J. Cole | 282,000 | |
| June 5 | Sour | Olivia Rodrigo | 295,000 | |
| June 12 | Evermore | Taylor Swift | 202,000 | |
| June 19 | The Voice of the Heroes | Lil Baby and Lil Durk | 150,000 | |
| June 26 | Hall of Fame | Polo G | 143,000 | |
| July 3 | Sour | Olivia Rodrigo | 105,000 | |
| July 10 | Call Me If You Get Lost | Tyler, the Creator | 169,000 | |
| July 17 | Sour | Olivia Rodrigo | 88,000 | |
| July 24 | Sour | Olivia Rodrigo | 83,000 | |
| July 31 | Faith | Pop Smoke | 88,000 | |
| August 7 | F*ck Love | The Kid Laroi | 85,000 | |
| August 14 | Happier Than Ever | Billie Eilish | 238,000 | |
| August 21 | Happier Than Ever | Billie Eilish | 85,000 | |
| August 28 | Happier Than Ever | Billie Eilish | 60,000 | |
| September 4 | Sour | Olivia Rodrigo | 133,000 | |
| September 11 | Donda | Kanye West | 309,000 | |
| September 18 | Certified Lover Boy | Drake | 613,000 | |
| September 25 | Certified Lover Boy | Drake | 236,000 | |
| October 2 | Certified Lover Boy | Drake | 171,000 | |
| October 9 | Sincerely, Kentrell | YoungBoy Never Broke Again | 137,000 | |
| October 16 | Fearless (Taylor's Version) | Taylor Swift | 152,000 | |
| October 23 | Certified Lover Boy | Drake | 94,000 | |
| October 30 | Punk | Young Thug | 90,000 | |
| November 6 | Certified Lover Boy | Drake | 74,000 | |
| November 13 | = | Ed Sheeran | 118,000 | |
| November 20 | Still Over It | Summer Walker | 166,000 | |
| November 27 | Red (Taylor's Version) | Taylor Swift | 605,000 | |
| December 4 | 30 | Adele | 839,000 | |
| December 11 | 30 | Adele | 288,000 | |
| December 18 | 30 | Adele | 193,000 | |
| December 25 | 30 | Adele | 183,000 | |

== Number-one artists ==
List of number-one artists by total weeks at number one
| Position | Country | Artist | Weeks at No. 1 |
|---|---|---|---|
| 1 | USA | Morgan Wallen | 10 |
| 2 | USA | Taylor Swift | 6 |
| 3 | CAN | Drake | 5 |
| 3 | US | Olivia Rodrigo | 5 |
| 5 | UK | Adele | 4 |
| 6 | US | Billie Eilish | 3 |
| 7 | CAN | Justin Bieber | 2 |
| 7 | US | Moneybagg Yo | 2 |
| 7 | US | Young Thug | 2 |
| 10 | US | Playboi Carti | 1 |
| 10 | US | Rod Wave | 1 |
| 10 | US | DJ Khaled | 1 |
| 10 | US | J. Cole | 1 |
| 10 | US | Lil Baby | 1 |
| 10 | US | Lil Durk | 1 |
| 10 | US | Polo G | 1 |
| 10 | US | Tyler, the Creator | 1 |
| 10 | US | Pop Smoke | 1 |
| 10 | AUS | The Kid Laroi | 1 |
| 10 | US | Kanye West | 1 |
| 10 | US | YoungBoy Never Broke Again | 1 |
| 10 | UK | Ed Sheeran | 1 |
| 10 | US | Summer Walker | 1 |

== See also ==
- List of Billboard Hot 100 number ones of 2021
- List of Billboard Global 200 number ones of 2021
- List of Billboard 200 number-one albums of the 2020s
- 2021 in American music
