= List of Billboard 200 number-one albums of 2022 =

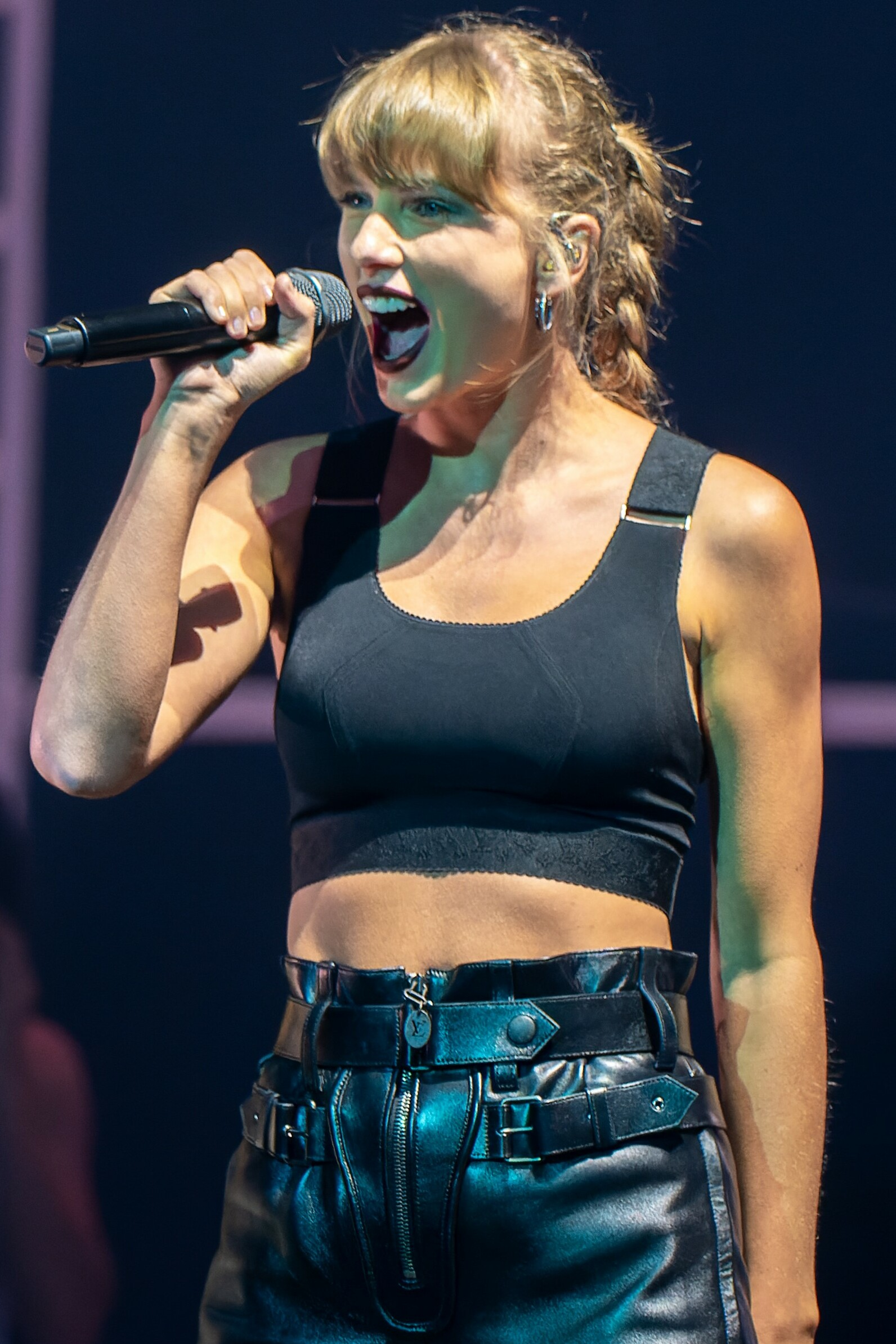
Taylor Swift's Midnights opened with over one million copies sold and became the best-selling album of 2022.

The Billboard 200 is a record chart published weekly by Billboard that ranks the best-performing albums in the U.S. The data is compiled by Luminate based on multi-metric consumption as measured in album-equivalent units, which comprise album sales, digital song sales, and streams on music platforms. Each unit equals one album, or 10 individual digital tracks, or 3,750 ad-supported streams, or 1,250 paid/subscription streams generated by songs from an album.

There were 26 albums that topped the Billboard 200 during the chart's 52 issue weeks. The top-performing album of the year was Un Verano Sin Ti by Puerto Rican rapper-singer Bad Bunny. It topped the chart for 13 non-consecutive weeks and registered the most weeks at number one since Drake's Views (2016). Un Verano Sin Ti became the first album in chart history to spend its first 24 weeks (6 months) in the top two and the first Latin album to top the Billboard Year-End chart. The soundtrack of Disney's 2021 animated musical film, Encanto, marked the sixth time in history an animated film's soundtrack reached number one on the Billboard 200, following The Lion King (1994), Pocahontas (1995), Curious George (2006), Frozen and Frozen II (2019).

American singer-songwriter Taylor Swift's album Midnights marked the year's biggest opening week with 1.578 million first-week units, the largest in the last seven years. It instantly became the fastest and best-selling album of 2022, and the biggest selling since Swift's own Reputation (2017); Swift also became the first artist in history to score 11 consecutive number-one debuts on the Billboard 200 chart. Born Pink, the second studio album by South Korean girl group Blackpink, marked the first number-one album on the Billboard 200 by a female group since Danity Kane's second album, Welcome to the Dollhouse (2008). South Korean boy group Stray Kids garnered two number ones on the chart this year, with their EPs Oddinary and Maxident; they became the first act to do so in 2022.

== Chart history ==
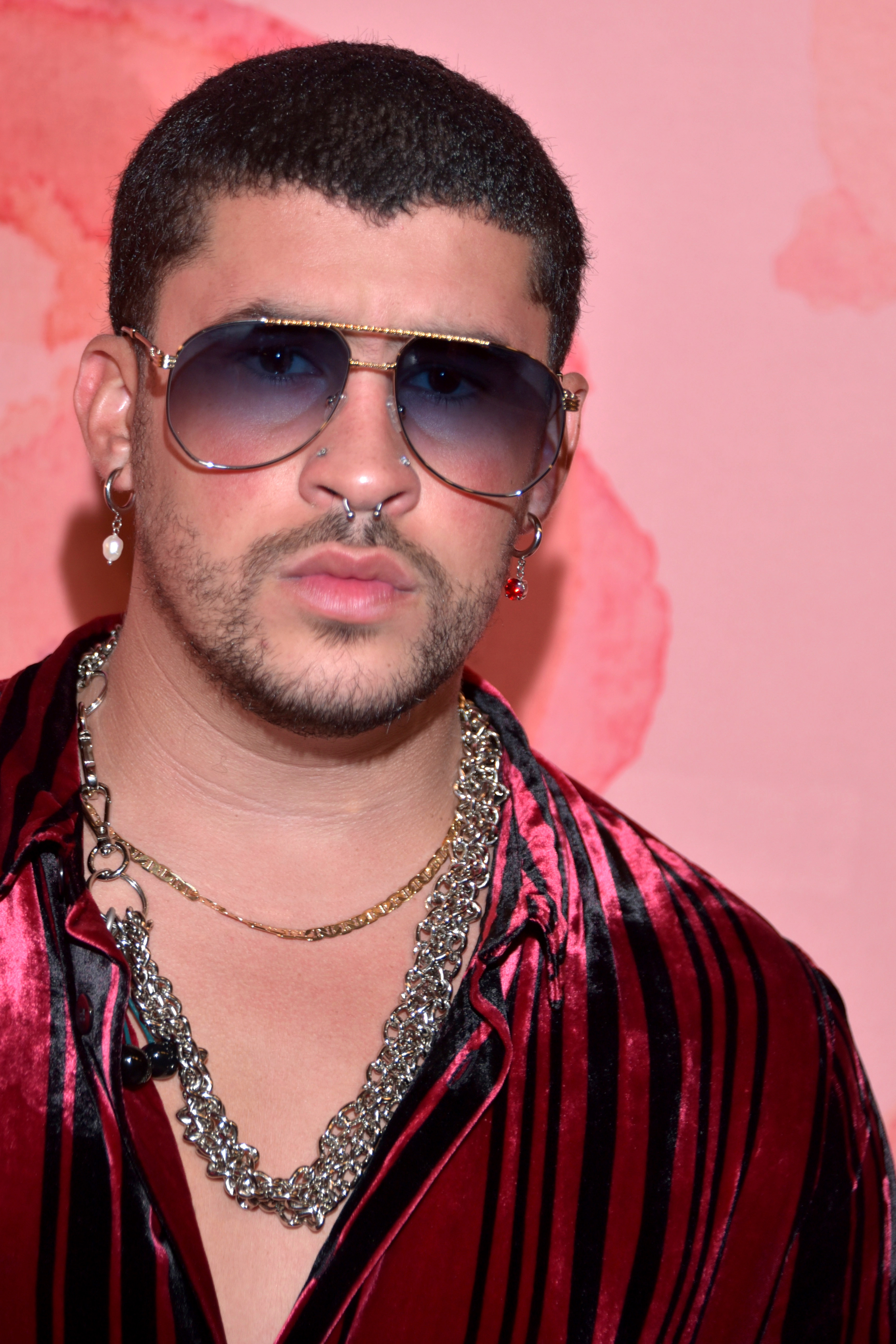
Un Verano Sin Ti by Bad Bunny topped the chart for 13 weeks and was the best-performing album of 2022.

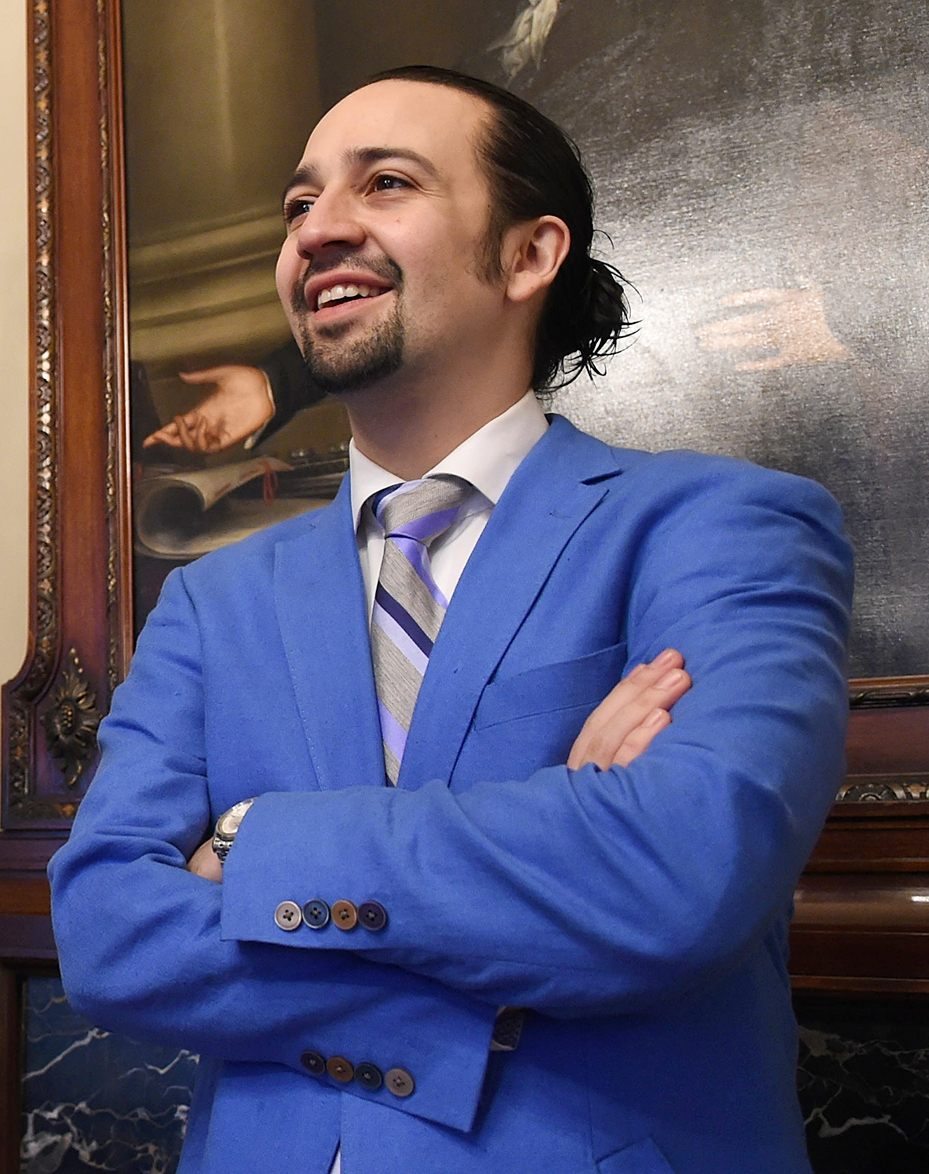
Lin-Manuel Miranda wrote the original songs for the soundtrack of Encanto, which topped the Billboard 200 for nine weeks.

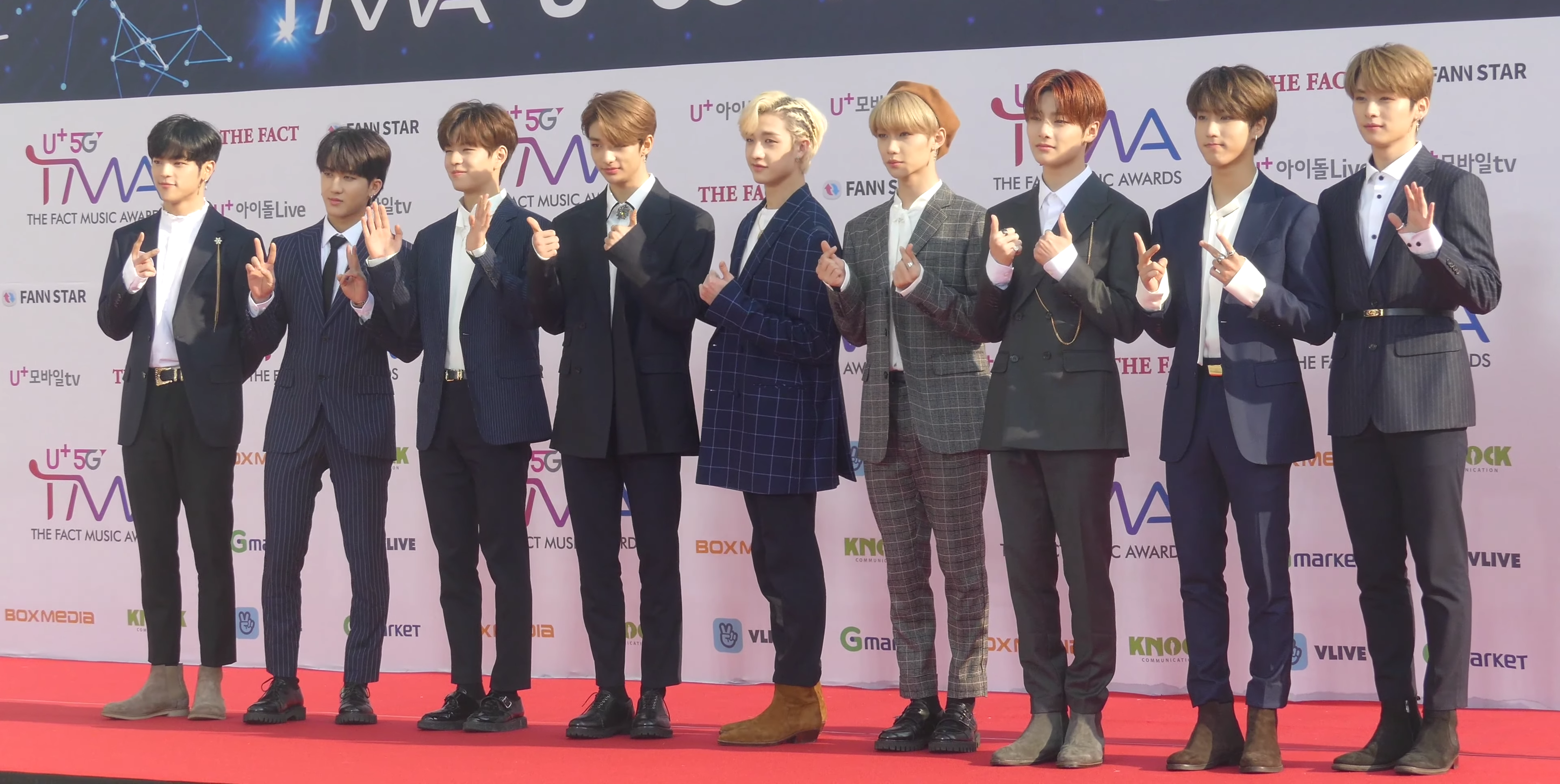
South Korean boy group Stray Kids garnered two number-one entries with their EPs Oddinary and Maxident.

Key
†	Indicates the best-performing album of 2022

Issue date	Album	Artist(s)	Album- equivalent units	Ref.
January 1	30	Adele	212,000	
January 8	30	Adele	99,000	
January 15	Encanto (Original Motion Picture Soundtrack)	Soundtrack	72,000	
January 22	DS4Ever	Gunna	150,300	
January 29	Encanto (Original Motion Picture Soundtrack)	Soundtrack	104,000	
February 5	Encanto (Original Motion Picture Soundtrack)	Soundtrack	115,000	
February 12	Encanto (Original Motion Picture Soundtrack)	Soundtrack	113,000	
February 19	Encanto (Original Motion Picture Soundtrack)	Soundtrack	110,000	
February 26	Encanto (Original Motion Picture Soundtrack)	Soundtrack	98,000	
March 5	Encanto (Original Motion Picture Soundtrack)	Soundtrack	90,000	
March 12	Encanto (Original Motion Picture Soundtrack)	Soundtrack	80,000	
March 19	Encanto (Original Motion Picture Soundtrack)	Soundtrack	72,500	
March 26	7220	Lil Durk	120,500	
April 2	Oddinary	Stray Kids	110,000	
April 9	Mainstream Sellout	Machine Gun Kelly	93,000	
April 16	Unlimited Love	Red Hot Chili Peppers	97,500	
April 23	7220	Lil Durk	47,000	
April 30	Call Me If You Get Lost	Tyler, the Creator	59,000	
May 7	It's Almost Dry	Pusha T	55,000	
May 14	I Never Liked You	Future	222,000	
May 21	Un Verano Sin Ti †	Bad Bunny	274,000	
May 28	Mr. Morale & the Big Steppers	Kendrick Lamar	295,500	
June 4	Harry's House	Harry Styles	521,500	
June 11	Harry's House	Harry Styles	160,500	
June 18	Un Verano Sin Ti †	Bad Bunny	137,000	
June 25	Proof	BTS	314,000	
July 2	Honestly, Nevermind	Drake	204,000	
July 9	Un Verano Sin Ti †	Bad Bunny	115,000	
July 16	Un Verano Sin Ti †	Bad Bunny	111,000	
July 23	Un Verano Sin Ti †	Bad Bunny	105,500	
July 30	Un Verano Sin Ti †	Bad Bunny	103,000	
August 6	Un Verano Sin Ti †	Bad Bunny	98,000	
August 13	Renaissance	Beyoncé	332,000	
August 20	Un Verano Sin Ti †	Bad Bunny	108,800	
August 27	Beautiful Mind	Rod Wave	115,000	
September 3	Un Verano Sin Ti †	Bad Bunny	105,000	
September 10	God Did	DJ Khaled	107,500	
September 17	Un Verano Sin Ti †	Bad Bunny	99,500	
September 24	Un Verano Sin Ti †	Bad Bunny	97,000	
October 1	Born Pink	Blackpink	102,000	
October 8	Un Verano Sin Ti †	Bad Bunny	87,000	
October 15	Un Verano Sin Ti †	Bad Bunny	84,000	
October 22	Maxident	Stray Kids	117,000	
October 29	It's Only Me	Lil Baby	216,000	
November 5	Midnights	Taylor Swift	1,578,000	
November 12	Midnights	Taylor Swift	342,000	
November 19	Her Loss	Drake and 21 Savage	404,000	
November 26	Midnights	Taylor Swift	204,000	
December 3	Midnights	Taylor Swift	177,000	
December 10	Midnights	Taylor Swift	151,000	
December 17	Heroes & Villains	Metro Boomin	185,000	
December 24	SOS	SZA	318,000	
December 31	SOS	SZA	180,000	

== Number-one artists ==
List of number-one artists by total weeks at number one
Position	Country	Artist	Weeks at No. 1
1	US (PRI)	Bad Bunny	13
2	COL/US	Various artists (Encanto)	9
3	US	Taylor Swift	5
4	UK	Adele	2
4	US	Lil Durk	2
4	UK	Harry Styles	2
4	KOR	Stray Kids	2
4	CAN	Drake	2
4	US	SZA	2
10	US	Gunna	1
10	US	Machine Gun Kelly	1
10	US	Red Hot Chili Peppers	1
10	US	Tyler, the Creator	1
10	US	Pusha T	1
10	US	Future	1
10	US	Kendrick Lamar	1
10	KOR	BTS	1
10	US	Beyoncé	1
10	US	Rod Wave	1
10	US	DJ Khaled	1
10	KOR	Blackpink	1
10	US	Lil Baby	1
10	UK	21 Savage	1
10	US	Metro Boomin	1

== See also ==
- List of Billboard Hot 100 number ones of 2022
- List of Billboard Global 200 number ones of 2022
- List of Billboard 200 number-one albums of the 2020s
- 2022 in American music
