= List of number-one albums of 2026 (Belgium) =

The Belgian Albums Chart, divided into the two main regions Flanders and Wallonia, ranks the best-performing albums in Belgium, as compiled by Ultratop.

== Flanders ==
List of number-one albums of 2026 in Flanders
Issue date	Album	Artist	Reference
3 January	Gedoe	Pommelien Thijs	
10 January	Gedoe	Pommelien Thijs	
17 January	Gedoe	Pommelien Thijs	
24 January	Locket	Madison Beer	
31 January	How Did I Get Here?	Louis Tomlinson	
7 February	The Art of Loving	Olivia Dean	
14 February	Debí Tirar Más Fotos	Bad Bunny	
21 February	Gedoe	Pommelien Thijs	
28 February	Prizefighter	Mumford & Sons	
7 March	The Mountain	Gorillaz	
14 March	Kiss All the Time. Disco, Occasionally.	Harry Styles	
21 March	Kiss All the Time. Disco, Occasionally.	Harry Styles	
28 March	Arirang	BTS	
4 April	This Music May Contain Hope	Raye	
11 April	Arirang	BTS	
18 April	Arirang	BTS	
25 April	Arirang	BTS	
2 May	Exit	Bazart	
9 May	Gedoe	Pommelien Thijs	
16 May	Boys Cry Too	The Haunted Youth	
23 May	Oorsprong	Aaron Blommaert	
30 May	Negen levens	Camille	
6 June	The Boys of Dungeon Lane	Paul McCartney	
13 June	Dinner Party	Niall Horan	
20 June	You Seem Pretty Sad for a Girl So in Love	Olivia Rodrigo	
27 June	You Seem Pretty Sad for a Girl So in Love	Olivia Rodrigo	
4 July	The Wow! Signal	Muse	
11 July	Confessions II	Madonna	
18 July	Foreign Tongues	The Rolling Stones	
25 July	Daughter from Hell	Gracie Abrams	
1 August	Music, Fashion, Film	Charli XCX	
8 August	Petal	Ariana Grande	
15 August	This & That	Stray Kids	
22 August	Wild	Katseye	
29 August	This & That	Stray Kids	
5 September	Wildchild	Alex Warren	
12 September	Prima	Adéla	
19 September	Bennie & de banaliteit van ons bestaan	Yong Yello	
26 September	Tarmac	Triggerfinger	
3 October	Stray Dogs	Nothing but Thieves	
10 October	Zo kan het dus ook	Niels Destadsbader	
17 October	Zo kan het dus ook	Niels Destadsbader	
24 October	Dopamine Chamber	Fontaines D.C.	
31 October	Superheld	K3	
7 November	Surface, Echo & Sound	Editors	
14 November	S.O.G	Leblanco	
21 November	Carnaval de Luz	U2	

== Wallonia ==
List of number-one albums of 2026 in Wallonia
Issue date	Album	Artist	Reference
3 January	Hélé 2	Helena	
10 January	Hélé 2	Helena	
17 January	M.I.L.S IV	Ninho	
24 January	M.I.L.S IV	Ninho	
31 January	Megadeth	Megadeth	
7 February	Stranger Things: Soundtrack from the Netflix Series, Season 5	Various artists	
14 February	Debí Tirar Más Fotos	Bad Bunny	
21 February	Debí Tirar Más Fotos	Bad Bunny	
28 February	Debí Tirar Más Fotos	Bad Bunny	
7 March	2026: La ballade des Enfoirés	Les Enfoirés	
14 March	Kiss All the Time. Disco, Occasionally.	Harry Styles	
21 March	Grand garçon	PLK	
28 March	Arirang	BTS	
4 April	Arirang	BTS	
11 April	Arirang	BTS	
18 April	Arirang	BTS	
25 April	Arirang	BTS	
2 May	Michael: Songs from the Motion Picture	Michael Jackson	
9 May	Thriller	Michael Jackson	
16 May	Boys Cry Too	The Haunted Youth	
23 May	Thriller	Michael Jackson	
30 May	Thriller	Michael Jackson	
6 June	The Boys of Dungeon Lane	Paul McCartney	
13 June	Dinner Party	Niall Horan	
20 June	You Seem Pretty Sad for a Girl So in Love	Olivia Rodrigo	
27 June	You Seem Pretty Sad for a Girl So in Love	Olivia Rodrigo	
4 July	The Wow! Signal	Muse	
11 July	Confessions II	Madonna	
18 July	Foreign Tongues	The Rolling Stones	
25 July	Daughter from Hell	Gracie Abrams	
1 August	Debí Tirar Más Fotos	Bad Bunny	
8 August	Petal	Ariana Grande	
15 August	This & That	Stray Kids	
22 August	Wild	Katseye	
29 August	This & That	Stray Kids	
5 September	Wildchild	Alex Warren	
12 September	This & That	Stray Kids	
19 September	D'amour et d'aléas	Suarez	
26 September	Bass Persuades	Miley Cyrus	
3 October	Ave de Maere	Pierre de Maere	
10 October	Volatil	Zazie	
17 October	Bonjour docteur	Hoshi	
24 October	Instinct	Angèle	
31 October	Instinct	Angèle	
7 November	Le plus beau	TeddyBear	
14 November	Le plus beau	TeddyBear	
21 November	Carnaval de Luz	U2	

== See also ==
- List of Ultratop 50 number-one singles of 2026
