= List of Billboard number-one dance albums of 2026 =

These are the albums that reached number one on the Billboard Top Dance Albums chart in 2026.

== Chart history ==
List of number-one albums
Issue date	Album	Artist	Reference
January 3	Mayhem	Lady Gaga	
January 10	Mayhem	Lady Gaga	
January 17	ABBA Gold	ABBA	
January 24	Mayhem	Lady Gaga	
January 31	The Fame	Lady Gaga	
February 7	The Fame	Lady Gaga	
February 14	The Fame	Lady Gaga	
February 21	Odyssey	Illenium	
February 28	The Fame	Lady Gaga	
March 7	The Fame	Lady Gaga	
March 14	Fancy Some More?	PinkPantheress	
March 21	Fancy Some More?	PinkPantheress	
March 28	Fancy Some More?	PinkPantheress	
April 4	Fancy Some More?	PinkPantheress	
April 11	Worst Girl in America	Slayyyter	
April 18	The Fame	Lady Gaga	
April 25	The Fame	Lady Gaga	
May 2	The Fame	Lady Gaga	
May 9	The Fame	Lady Gaga	
May 16	Mamihlapinatapai	Illit	
May 23	The Fame	Lady Gaga	
May 30	The Fame	Lady Gaga	
June 6	The Fame	Lady Gaga	
June 13	Inferno	Boards of Canada	
June 20	The Fame	Lady Gaga	
June 27	Dirty Blonde	Bebe Rexha	
July 4	The Fame	Lady Gaga	
July 11	The Fame	Lady Gaga	
July 18	Confessions II	Madonna	
July 25	Confessions II	Madonna	
August 1	Confessions II	Madonna	
August 8	The Fame	Lady Gaga	
August 15	Deadbeat	Tame Impala	
August 22	Deadbeat	Tame Impala	
August 29	Deadbeat	Tame Impala	
September 5	Deadbeat	Tame Impala	
September 12	Deadbeat	Tame Impala	
September 19	Deadbeat	Tame Impala	
September 26	Deadbeat	Tame Impala	
October 3	Bass Persuades	Miley Cyrus	
October 10	Deadbeat	Tame Impala	
October 17	The Fame	Lady Gaga	
October 24	Deadbeat	Tame Impala	
October 31	The Fame	Lady Gaga	
November 7	The Fame	Lady Gaga	
November 14	The Fame	Lady Gaga	
