= List of Billboard 200 number-one albums of the 2020s =

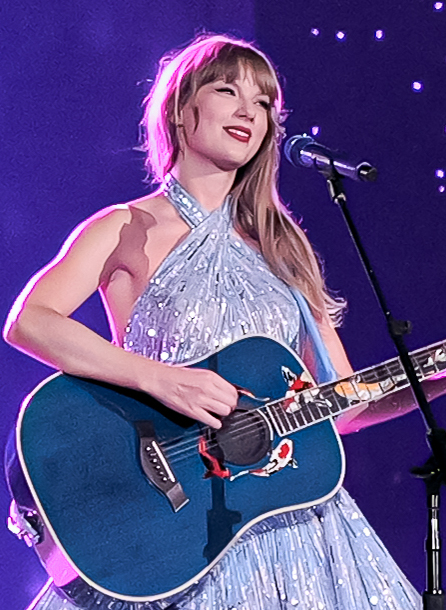
Taylor Swift topped the chart for 61 weeks with nine different albums in the 2020s decade; one of them, The Tortured Poets Department, spent 17 weeks at number one and became the best selling album of 2024.

This article lists the albums ranked number one in the United States during the 2020s decade. The top-performing albums and EPs in the U.S. are ranked on the Billboard 200 chart, which is published by Billboard magazine. The data is compiled by Luminate Data based on multi-metric consumption as measured in album-equivalent units, which comprise album sales, track sales, and streams on digital music platforms. For issues dated January 4, 2020, to January 10, 2026, each unit equals one album sold, or ten individual digital tracks sold from an album, or 3,750 ad-supported or 1,250 paid/subscription on-demand official audio and video streams generated by songs from an album. Starting on the issue dated January 17, 2026, each unit equals one album sold, or ten individual digital tracks sold from an album, or 2,500 ad-supported or 1,000 paid/subscription on-demand official audio and video streams generated by songs from an album.

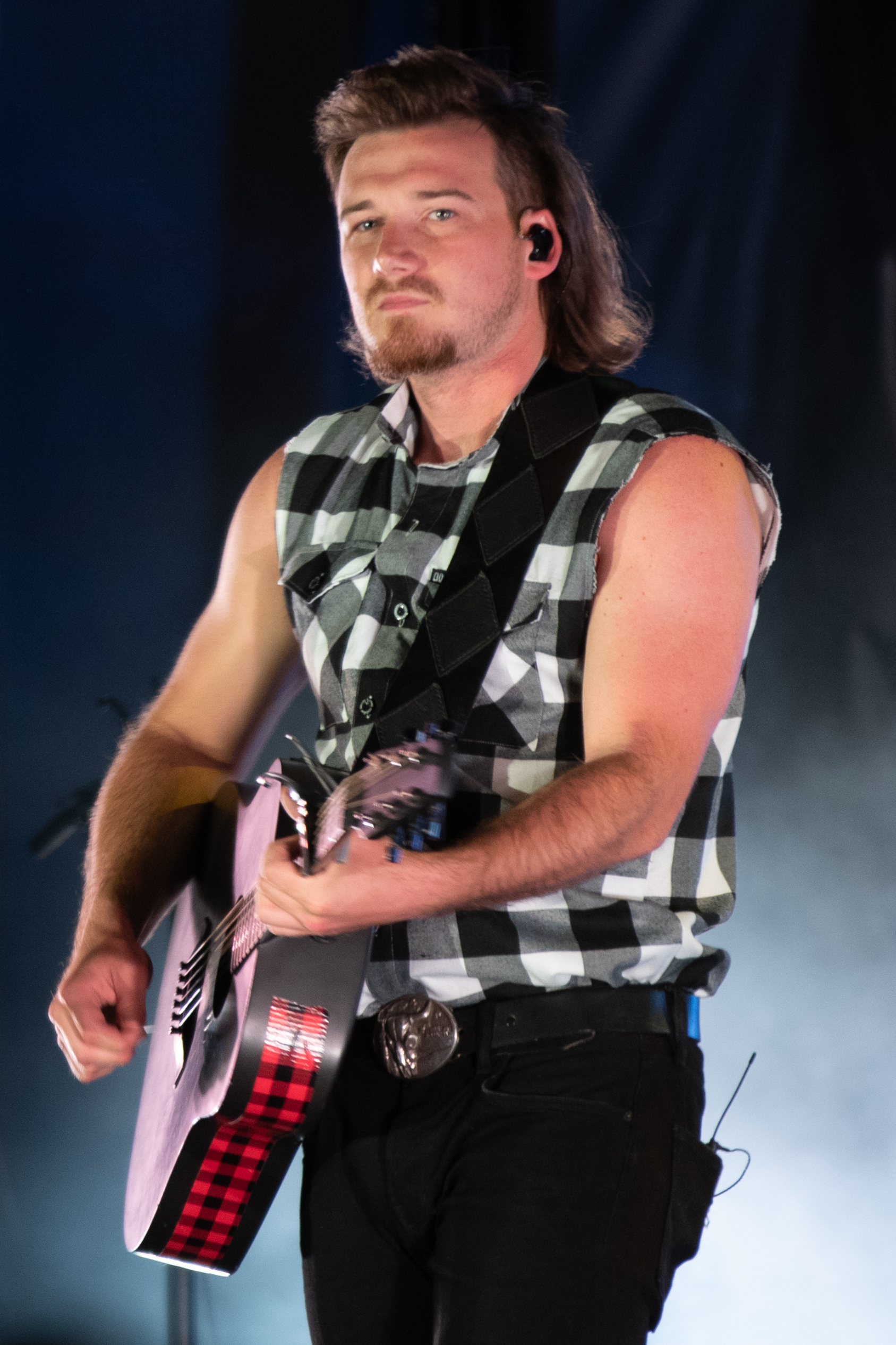
One Thing at a Time by American country singer Morgan Wallen is the longest-running number-one album of the decade with 19 weeks.

One Thing at a Time, the third studio album by American country singer Morgan Wallen, is the longest-running number-one album of the decade, topping the chart for 19 non-consecutive weeks. It also became the most consumed album of 2023. Taylor Swift's eleventh studio album, The Tortured Poets Department (2024), is the longest-running number-one on the Billboard 200 by a female artist in the 2020s, topping the chart for 17 weeks.

== Number-one albums ==
Key

* – The current number one
♪ – Number-one album of the year

Note: The best-performing album on the Billboard 200 of 2020 was Post Malone's Hollywood's Bleeding, but its reign at number one on the Billboard 200 occurred in September and November 2019.

Reached number one	Album	Artist(s)	Weeks at number one	References
2020
January 11	JackBoys	JackBoys and Travis Scott	1	
January 18	Please Excuse Me for Being Antisocial	Roddy Ricch	3	
January 25	Rare	Selena Gomez	1	
February 1	Music to Be Murdered By	Eminem	1	
February 15	Funeral	Lil Wayne	1	
February 29	Changes	Justin Bieber	1	
March 7	Map of the Soul: 7	BTS	1	
March 14	My Turn	Lil Baby	5	
March 21	Eternal Atake	Lil Uzi Vert	2	
April 4	After Hours	The Weeknd	4	
May 2	Blame It on Baby	DaBaby	1	
May 9	38 Baby 2	YoungBoy Never Broke Again	1	
May 16	Here and Now	Kenny Chesney	1	
May 23	Good Intentions	Nav	1	
May 30	High Off Life	Future	1	
June 6	Wunna	Gunna	1	
June 13	Chromatica	Lady Gaga	1	
July 18	Shoot for the Stars, Aim for the Moon	Pop Smoke	2	
July 25	Legends Never Die	Juice Wrld	2	
August 8	Folklore	Taylor Swift	8	
September 19	Detroit 2	Big Sean	1	
September 26	Top	YoungBoy Never Broke Again	1	
October 10	Tickets to My Downfall	Machine Gun Kelly	1	
October 17	Savage Mode II	21 Savage and Metro Boomin	1	
November 7	What You See Is What You Get	Luke Combs	1	
November 14	Positions	Ariana Grande	2	
November 28	Power Up	AC/DC	1	
December 5	Be	BTS	1	
December 12	El Último Tour Del Mundo	Bad Bunny	1	
December 19	Wonder	Shawn Mendes	1	
December 26	Evermore	Taylor Swift	4	
2021
January 9	Whole Lotta Red	Playboi Carti	1	
January 23	Dangerous: The Double Album ♪	Morgan Wallen	10	
April 3	Justice	Justin Bieber	2	
April 10	SoulFly	Rod Wave	1	
April 24	Fearless (Taylor's Version)	Taylor Swift	2	
May 1	Slime Language 2	Young Thug and Gunna	1	
May 8	A Gangsta's Pain	Moneybagg Yo	2	
May 15	Khaled Khaled	DJ Khaled	1	
May 29	The Off-Season	J. Cole	1	
June 5	Sour	Olivia Rodrigo	5	
June 19	The Voice of the Heroes	Lil Baby and Lil Durk	1	
June 26	Hall of Fame	Polo G	1	
July 10	Call Me If You Get Lost	Tyler, the Creator	2	
July 31	Faith	Pop Smoke	1	
August 7	F*ck Love	The Kid Laroi	1	
August 14	Happier Than Ever	Billie Eilish	3	
September 11	Donda	Kanye West	1	
September 18	Certified Lover Boy	Drake	5	
October 9	Sincerely, Kentrell	YoungBoy Never Broke Again	1	
October 30	Punk	Young Thug	1	
November 13	=	Ed Sheeran	1	
November 20	Still Over It	Summer Walker	1	
November 27	Red (Taylor's Version)	Taylor Swift	1	
December 4	30	Adele	6	
2022
January 15	Encanto (Original Motion Picture Soundtrack)	Various artists	9	
January 22	DS4Ever	Gunna	1	
March 26	7220	Lil Durk	2	
April 2	Oddinary	Stray Kids	1	
April 9	Mainstream Sellout	Machine Gun Kelly	1	
April 16	Unlimited Love	Red Hot Chili Peppers	1	
May 7	It's Almost Dry	Pusha T	1	
May 14	I Never Liked You	Future	1	
May 21	Un Verano Sin Ti ♪	Bad Bunny	13	
May 28	Mr. Morale & the Big Steppers	Kendrick Lamar	1	
June 4	Harry's House	Harry Styles	2	
June 25	Proof	BTS	1	
July 2	Honestly, Nevermind	Drake	1	
August 13	Renaissance	Beyoncé	1	
August 27	Beautiful Mind	Rod Wave	1	
September 10	God Did	DJ Khaled	1	
October 1	Born Pink	Blackpink	1	
October 22	Maxident	Stray Kids	1	
October 29	It's Only Me	Lil Baby	1	
November 5	Midnights	Taylor Swift	6	
November 19	Her Loss	Drake and 21 Savage	1	
December 17	Heroes & Villains	Metro Boomin	1	
December 24	SOS	SZA	13	
2023
February 11	The Name Chapter: Temptation	Tomorrow X Together	1	
March 11	Mañana Será Bonito	Karol G	1	
March 18	One Thing at a Time ♪	Morgan Wallen	19	
June 17	5-Star	Stray Kids	1	
July 15	Pink Tape	Lil Uzi Vert	1	
July 22	Speak Now (Taylor's Version)	Taylor Swift	2	
August 5	Get Up	NewJeans	1	
August 12	Utopia	Travis Scott	4	
September 9	Zach Bryan	Zach Bryan	2	
September 23	Guts	Olivia Rodrigo	1	
September 30	Nostalgia	Rod Wave	2	
October 21	For All the Dogs	Drake	2	
October 28	Nadie Sabe Lo Que Va a Pasar Mañana	Bad Bunny	1	
November 4	One More Time...	Blink-182	1	
November 11	1989 (Taylor's Version)	Taylor Swift	6	
November 25	Rock-Star	Stray Kids	1	
December 16	The World EP.Fin: Will	Ateez	1	
December 23	Pink Friday 2	Nicki Minaj	1	
2024
January 27	American Dream	21 Savage	2	
February 17	35 Biggest Hits	Toby Keith	1	
February 24	Vultures 1	¥$: Kanye West and Ty Dolla Sign	2	
March 9	With You-th	Twice	1	
March 23	Eternal Sunshine	Ariana Grande	3	
April 6	We Don't Trust You	Future and Metro Boomin	1	
April 13	Cowboy Carter	Beyoncé	2	
April 27	We Still Don't Trust You	Future and Metro Boomin	1	
May 4	The Tortured Poets Department ♪	Taylor Swift	17	
July 27	The Death of Slim Shady (Coup de Grâce)	Eminem	1	
August 3	Ate	Stray Kids	1	
August 31	F-1 Trillion	Post Malone	1	
September 7	Short n' Sweet	Sabrina Carpenter	4	
September 28	Days Before Rodeo	Travis Scott	1	
October 5	Mixtape Pluto	Future	1	
October 19	Moon Music	Coldplay	1	
October 26	Beautifully Broken	Jelly Roll	1	
November 2	Lyfestyle	Yeat	1	
November 9	Chromakopia	Tyler, the Creator	3	
November 30	Golden Hour: Part.2	Ateez	1	
December 7	GNX	Kendrick Lamar	3	
December 28	Hop	Stray Kids	1	
2025
January 18	WHAM	Lil Baby	1	
January 25	Debí Tirar Más Fotos	Bad Bunny	5	
February 15	Hurry Up Tomorrow	The Weeknd	1	
March 1	Some Sexy Songs 4 U	PartyNextDoor and Drake	1	
March 8	So Close to What	Tate McRae	1	
March 22	Mayhem	Lady Gaga	1	
March 29	Music	Playboi Carti	3	
April 26	More Chaos	Ken Carson	1	
May 10	Skeletá	Ghost	1	
May 24	Even in Arcadia	Sleep Token	1	
May 31	I'm the Problem	Morgan Wallen	14	
July 26	JackBoys 2	JackBoys and Travis Scott	1	
August 2	Don't Tap the Glass	Tyler, the Creator	1	
September 6	Karma	Stray Kids	1	
September 13	Man's Best Friend	Sabrina Carpenter	1	
September 20	KPop Demon Hunters (Soundtrack from the Netflix Film)	Various artists	2	
September 27	Breach	Twenty One Pilots	1	
October 4	Am I the Drama?	Cardi B	1	
October 18	The Life of a Showgirl ♪	Taylor Swift	15	
December 6	Do It	Stray Kids	1	
2026
January 24	With Heaven on Top	Zach Bryan	1	
January 31	Don't Be Dumb	ASAP Rocky	1	
February 7	Megadeth	Megadeth	1	
February 14	Octane	Don Toliver	1	
February 21	The Fall-Off	J. Cole	1	
March 7	Cloud 9	Megan Moroney	1	
March 14	The Romantic	Bruno Mars	1	
March 21	Kiss All the Time. Disco, Occasionally	Harry Styles	2	
April 4	Arirang	BTS	3	
April 25	Dandelion	Ella Langley	3	
May 9	The Great Divide	Noah Kahan	3	
May 30	Iceman	Drake	4	
June 27	You Seem Pretty Sad for a Girl So in Love	Olivia Rodrigo	4*	
July 11	Golden Hour: Part.5	Ateez	1	
July 18	Confessions II	Madonna	1	
July 25	The Real Me	Future	1	
August 1	Daughter from Hell	Gracie Abrams	1	
August 15	Petal	Ariana Grande	1	
August 22	This & That	Stray Kids	1	
August 29	Wild	Katseye	1	
September 5	The Sin: Bliss	Enhypen	1	
September 12	Don't Look Down	Rod Wave	1	
September 26	Westside Whimsy	Jhené Aiko	1	
October 3	Bass Persuades	Miley Cyrus	1	
November 7	The Black Parade	My Chemical Romance	1	

== Statistics ==
=== Artists by total number-one albums ===
The following artists achieved three or more number-one albums during the 2020s. A number of artists had number-one albums on their own as well as part of a collaboration. An asterisk (*) denotes that an artist is currently at number one.

Artist	Number-one albums	Albums
Stray Kids	9	Oddinary—Maxident—5-Star—Rock-Star—Ate—Hop—Karma—Do It—This & That
Taylor Swift	9	Folklore—Evermore—Fearless (Taylor's Version)—Red (Taylor's Version)—Midnights— Speak Now (Taylor's Version)—1989 (Taylor's Version)—The Tortured Poets Department—The Life of a Showgirl
Drake	6	Certified Lover Boy—Honestly, Nevermind—Her Loss—For All the Dogs—Some Sexy Songs 4 U—Iceman
Future	6	High Off Life—I Never Liked You—We Don't Trust You—We Still Don't Trust You—Mixtape Pluto—The Real Me
Bad Bunny	4	El Último Tour Del Mundo—Un Verano Sin Ti—Nadie Sabe Lo Que Va a Pasar Mañana—Debí Tirar Más Fotos
BTS	4	Map of the Soul: 7—Be—Proof—Arirang
Lil Baby	4	My Turn—The Voice of the Heroes—It's Only Me—WHAM
Metro Boomin	4	Savage Mode II—Heroes & Villains—We Don't Trust You—We Still Don't Trust You
Rod Wave	4	SoulFly—Beautiful Mind—Nostalgia—Don't Look Down
Travis Scott	4	JackBoys—Utopia—Days Before Rodeo—JackBoys 2
21 Savage	3	Savage Mode II—Her Loss—American Dream
Ariana Grande	3	Positions—Eternal Sunshine—Petal
Ateez	3	The World EP.Fin: Will—Golden Hour: Part.2—Golden Hour: Part.5
Morgan Wallen	3	Dangerous: The Double Album—One Thing at a Time—I'm the Problem
Olivia Rodrigo*	3	Sour—Guts—You Seem Pretty Sad for a Girl So in Love
Tyler, the Creator	3	Call Me If You Get Lost—Chromakopia—Don't Tap the Glass
YoungBoy Never Broke Again	3	38 Baby 2—Top—Sincerely, Kentrell

=== Artists by total cumulative weeks at number one ===
The following artists were featured at the top of the Billboard 200 for the highest cumulative number of weeks during the 2020s. Some totals include in part or in whole weeks spent at number one as part of a collaboration. An asterisk (*) denotes that an artist is currently at number one.

Artist	Weeks at number one	Albums
Taylor Swift	61	Folklore (8 weeks); Evermore (4 weeks); Fearless (Taylor's Version) (2 weeks); Red (Taylor's Version) (1 week); Midnights (6 weeks); Speak Now (Taylor's Version) (2 weeks); 1989 (Taylor's Version) (6 weeks); The Tortured Poets Department (17 weeks); The Life of a Showgirl (15 weeks)
Morgan Wallen	43	Dangerous: The Double Album (10 weeks); One Thing at a Time (19 weeks); I'm the Problem (14 weeks)
Bad Bunny	20	El Último Tour Del Mundo (1 week); Un Verano Sin Ti (13 weeks); Nadie Sabe Lo Que Va a Pasar Mañana (1 week); Debí Tirar Más Fotos (5 weeks)
Drake	14	Certified Lover Boy (5 weeks); Honestly, Nevermind (1 week); Her Loss (1 week); For All the Dogs (2 weeks); Some Sexy Songs 4 U (1 week); Iceman (4 weeks)
SZA	13	SOS (13 weeks)
Olivia Rodrigo*	11	Sour (5 weeks); Guts (1 week); You Seem Pretty Sad for a Girl So in Love (5 weeks)
Stray Kids	9	Oddinary (1 week); Maxident (1 week); 5-Star (1 week); Rock-Star (1 week); Ate (1 week); Hop (1 week); Karma (1 week); Do It (1 week); This & That (1 week)
Lil Baby	8	My Turn (5 weeks); The Voice of the Heroes (1 week); It's Only Me (1 week); WHAM (1 week)
Travis Scott	7	JackBoys (1 week); Utopia (4 weeks); Days Before Rodeo (1 week); JackBoys 2 (1 week)
Adele	6	30 (6 weeks)
Ariana Grande	6	Positions (2 weeks); Eternal Sunshine (3 weeks); Petal (1 week)
BTS	6	Map of the Soul: 7 (1 week); Be (1 week); Proof (1 week); Arirang (3 weeks)
Future	6	High Off Life (1 week); I Never Liked You (1 week); We Don't Trust You (1 week); We Still Don't Trust You (1 week); Mixtape Pluto (1 week); The Real Me (1 week)
Tyler, the Creator	6	Call Me If You Get Lost (2 weeks); Chromakopia (3 weeks); Don't Tap the Glass (1 week)

=== Albums by total number of weeks at number one ===
The following albums were featured at the top of the Billboard 200 for the highest number of weeks during the 2020s. An asterisk (*) denotes that an album is currently at number one.

Album	Artist(s)	Weeks at number one
One Thing at a Time	Morgan Wallen	19
The Tortured Poets Department	Taylor Swift	17
The Life of a Showgirl	Taylor Swift	15
I'm the Problem	Morgan Wallen	14
SOS	SZA	13
Un Verano Sin Ti	Bad Bunny	13
Dangerous: The Double Album	Morgan Wallen	10
Encanto (Original Motion Picture Soundtrack)	Various artists	9
Folklore	Taylor Swift	8
30	Adele	6
Midnights	Taylor Swift	6
1989 (Taylor's Version)	Taylor Swift	6
