= List of Billboard Global 200 number ones of 2021 =

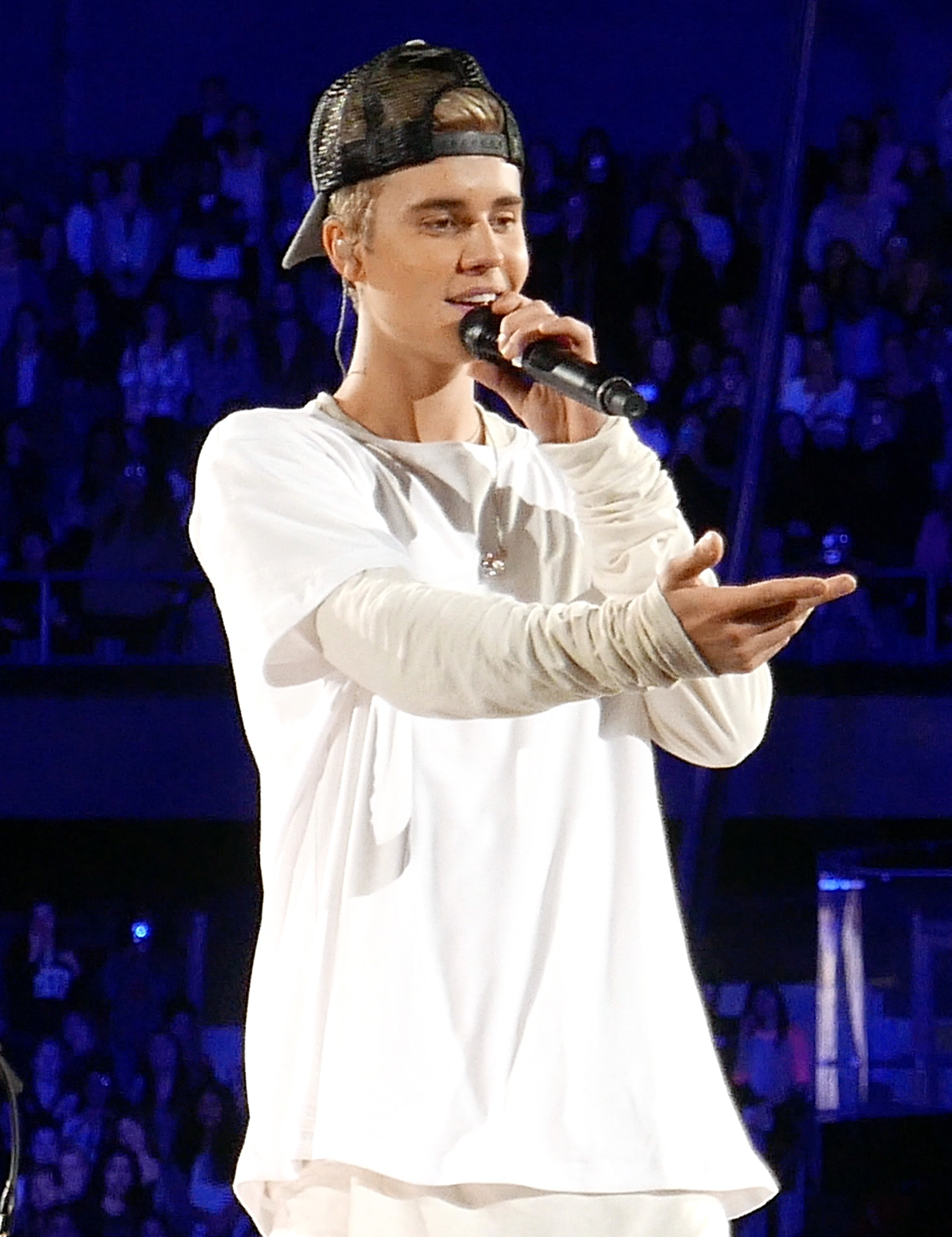
Canadian singer Justin Bieber topped the Global 200 for 13 weeks and the Global Excl. US for 14 weeks, aided by two number-one singles "Peaches" and the Kid Laroi collaboration "Stay".

The Billboard Global 200 is a chart that ranks the best-performing songs globally. Its data, published by Billboard magazine and compiled by MRC Data, is based on digital sales and online streaming from over 200 territories worldwide. Another similar chart is the Billboard Global Excl. US chart, which follows the same formula except it covers all territories excluding the US.

On the Global 200, fourteen singles reached number one in 2021. In addition, two other number-one singles, "All I Want for Christmas Is You" by Mariah Carey and "Dynamite" by BTS, had each previously hit number one in 2020. Sixteen artists reached the top of the chart, with thirteen—Olivia Rodrigo, Drake, Rosé, Justin Bieber, Daniel Caesar, Giveon, Lil Nas X, The Weeknd, Ed Sheeran, the Kid Laroi, Coldplay, Adele, and Taylor Swift—achieving their first number-one single. BTS scored three number-one singles while Rodrigo and Bieber scored two each, as the only acts to achieve multiple number-one songs in 2021. Olivia Rodrigo spent the most weeks at the top spot with 14 non-consecutive weeks at number one, while "Stay" by Justin Bieber and the Kid Laroi is the longest reigning number-one song with 11 weeks atop the chart.

On the Global Excl. US, eleven singles reached number one in 2021. In addition, two other number-one singles, "All I Want for Christmas Is You" by Mariah Carey and "Dynamite" by BTS, had each previously hit number one in 2020. Thirteen artists reached the top of the chart, with eleven—Olivia Rodrigo, Rosé, Justin Bieber, Daniel Caesar, Giveon, Lil Nas X, Ed Sheeran, the Kid Laroi, Coldplay, Adele, and Taylor Swift—achieving their first number-one single. BTS scored three number-one singles while Justin Bieber scored two, as the only acts to achieve multiple number-one songs in 2021. Bieber also spent the most weeks at the top spot with 14 non-consecutive weeks at number one. Bieber and the Kid Laroi's song "Stay" is tied with Olivia Rodrigo's "Drivers License" as the longest reigning number-one song of 2021, each with nine weeks atop the chart.

== Chart history ==
Key
†	The #1 song of 2021 on the Global 200, "Levitating" by Dua Lipa, never reached #1 on the weekly charts.
‡	Indicates best-performing song of 2021 on the Global Excl. US

Issue date	Billboard Global 200		Billboard Global Excl. US		Ref.
Issue date	Song	Artist(s)	Song	Artist(s)	Ref.
January 2	"All I Want for Christmas Is You"	Mariah Carey	"All I Want for Christmas Is You"	Mariah Carey	
January 9	"All I Want for Christmas Is You"	Mariah Carey	"Dynamite" ‡	BTS	
January 16	"Dynamite"	BTS	"Dynamite" ‡	BTS	
January 23	"Drivers License"	Olivia Rodrigo	"Drivers License"	Olivia Rodrigo	
January 30	"Drivers License"	Olivia Rodrigo	"Drivers License"	Olivia Rodrigo	
February 6	"Drivers License"	Olivia Rodrigo	"Drivers License"	Olivia Rodrigo	
February 13	"Drivers License"	Olivia Rodrigo	"Drivers License"	Olivia Rodrigo	
February 20	"Drivers License"	Olivia Rodrigo	"Drivers License"	Olivia Rodrigo	
February 27	"Drivers License"	Olivia Rodrigo	"Drivers License"	Olivia Rodrigo	
March 6	"Drivers License"	Olivia Rodrigo	"Drivers License"	Olivia Rodrigo	
March 13	"Drivers License"	Olivia Rodrigo	"Drivers License"	Olivia Rodrigo	
March 20	"What's Next"	Drake	"Drivers License"	Olivia Rodrigo	
March 27	"On the Ground"	Rosé	"On the Ground"	Rosé	
April 3	"Peaches"	Justin Bieber feat. Daniel Caesar and Giveon	"Peaches"	Justin Bieber feat. Daniel Caesar and Giveon	
April 10	"Peaches"	Justin Bieber feat. Daniel Caesar and Giveon	"Peaches"	Justin Bieber feat. Daniel Caesar and Giveon	
April 17	"Montero (Call Me by Your Name)"	Lil Nas X	"Peaches"	Justin Bieber feat. Daniel Caesar and Giveon	
April 24	"Montero (Call Me by Your Name)"	Lil Nas X	"Peaches"	Justin Bieber feat. Daniel Caesar and Giveon	
May 1	"Montero (Call Me by Your Name)"	Lil Nas X	"Peaches"	Justin Bieber feat. Daniel Caesar and Giveon	
May 8	"Save Your Tears"	The Weeknd and Ariana Grande	"Montero (Call Me by Your Name)"	Lil Nas X	
May 15	"Montero (Call Me by Your Name)"	Lil Nas X	"Montero (Call Me by Your Name)"	Lil Nas X	
May 22	"Montero (Call Me by Your Name)"	Lil Nas X	"Montero (Call Me by Your Name)"	Lil Nas X	
May 29	"Good 4 U"	Olivia Rodrigo	"Montero (Call Me by Your Name)"	Lil Nas X	
June 5	"Butter"	BTS	"Butter"	BTS	
June 12	"Butter"	BTS	"Butter"	BTS	
June 19	"Good 4 U"	Olivia Rodrigo	"Butter"	BTS	
June 26	"Good 4 U"	Olivia Rodrigo	"Butter"	BTS	
July 3	"Good 4 U"	Olivia Rodrigo	"Butter"	BTS	
July 10	"Good 4 U"	Olivia Rodrigo	"Bad Habits"	Ed Sheeran	
July 17	"Good 4 U"	Olivia Rodrigo	"Bad Habits"	Ed Sheeran	
July 24	"Permission to Dance"	BTS	"Permission to Dance"	BTS	
July 31	"Bad Habits"	Ed Sheeran	"Bad Habits"	Ed Sheeran	
August 7	"Stay"	The Kid Laroi and Justin Bieber	"Bad Habits"	Ed Sheeran	
August 14	"Stay"	The Kid Laroi and Justin Bieber	"Bad Habits"	Ed Sheeran	
August 21	"Stay"	The Kid Laroi and Justin Bieber	"Stay"	The Kid Laroi and Justin Bieber	
August 28	"Stay"	The Kid Laroi and Justin Bieber	"Stay"	The Kid Laroi and Justin Bieber	
September 4	"Stay"	The Kid Laroi and Justin Bieber	"Stay"	The Kid Laroi and Justin Bieber	
September 11	"Stay"	The Kid Laroi and Justin Bieber	"Stay"	The Kid Laroi and Justin Bieber	
September 18	"Stay"	The Kid Laroi and Justin Bieber	"Stay"	The Kid Laroi and Justin Bieber	
September 25	"Stay"	The Kid Laroi and Justin Bieber	"Stay"	The Kid Laroi and Justin Bieber	
October 2	"Stay"	The Kid Laroi and Justin Bieber	"Stay"	The Kid Laroi and Justin Bieber	
October 9	"My Universe"	Coldplay and BTS	"My Universe"	Coldplay and BTS	
October 16	"Stay"	The Kid Laroi and Justin Bieber	"Stay"	The Kid Laroi and Justin Bieber	
October 23	"Stay"	The Kid Laroi and Justin Bieber	"Stay"	The Kid Laroi and Justin Bieber	
October 30	"Easy on Me"	Adele	"Easy on Me"	Adele	
November 6	"Easy on Me"	Adele	"Easy on Me"	Adele	
November 13	"Easy on Me"	Adele	"Easy on Me"	Adele	
November 20	"Easy on Me"	Adele	"Easy on Me"	Adele	
November 27	"All Too Well (Taylor's Version)	Taylor Swift	"All Too Well (Taylor's Version)"	Taylor Swift	
December 4	"Easy on Me"	Adele	"Easy on Me"	Adele	
December 11	"Easy on Me"	Adele	"Easy on Me"	Adele	
December 18	"All I Want for Christmas Is You"	Mariah Carey	"Easy on Me"	Adele	
December 25	"All I Want for Christmas Is You"	Mariah Carey	"All I Want for Christmas Is You"	Mariah Carey	

== Number-one artists ==
List of number-one artists by total weeks at number one on Global 200
Position	Artist	Weeks at No. 1
1	Olivia Rodrigo	14
2	Justin Bieber	13
3	The Kid Laroi	11
4	Adele	6
5	Lil Nas X	5
5	BTS	5
6	Mariah Carey	4
7	Daniel Caesar	2
7	Giveon	2
8	Drake	1
8	Rosé	1
8	The Weeknd	1
8	Ariana Grande	1
8	Ed Sheeran	1
8	Coldplay	1
8	Taylor Swift	1

List of number-one artists by total weeks at number one on Global Excl. US
Position	Artist	Weeks at No. 1
1	Justin Bieber	14
2	Olivia Rodrigo	9
2	BTS	9
2	The Kid Laroi	9
3	Adele	7
4	Daniel Caesar	5
4	Giveon	5
4	Ed Sheeran	5
5	Lil Nas X	4
6	Mariah Carey	2
7	Rosé	1
7	Coldplay	1
7	Taylor Swift	1

== See also ==
- 2021 in music
- List of Billboard 200 number-one albums of 2021
- List of Billboard Hot 100 number ones of 2021
- Billboard Year-End Global 200 singles of 2021
