= Model/Actriz =

American rock band

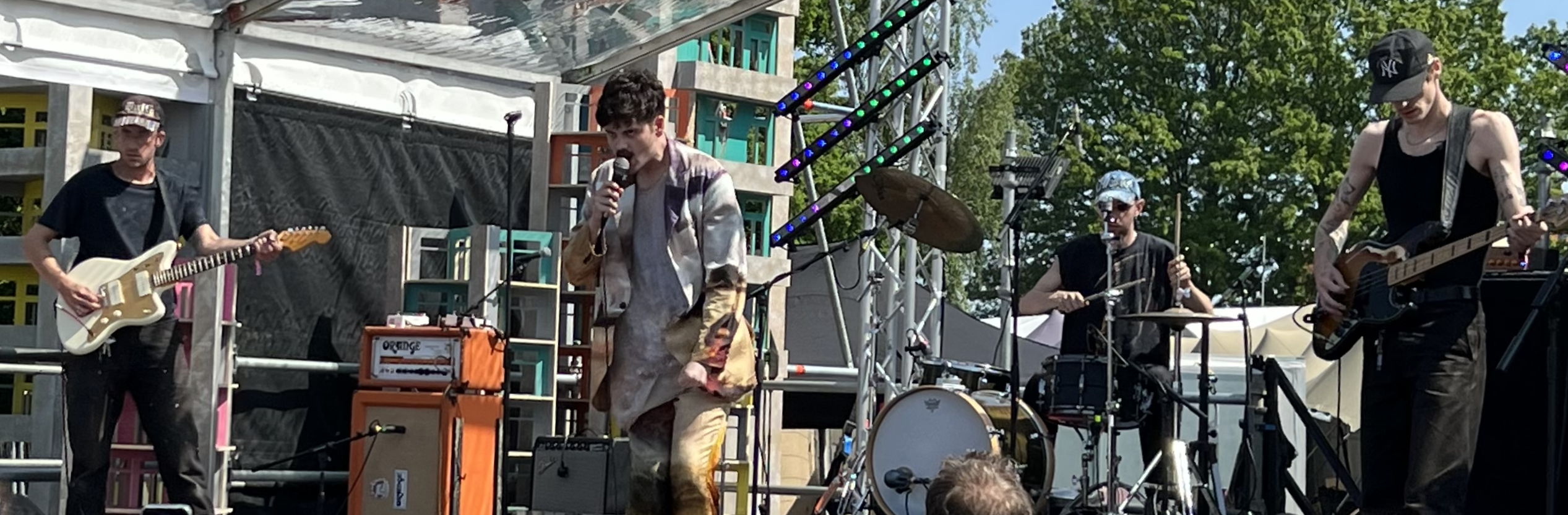
- Model/Actriz performing in 2023

Background information
- Origin: Boston, Massachusetts, U.S.
- Genres: Post-punk; noise rock; dance-punk; industrial rock
- Years active: 2016–2017; 2019–present
- Labels: True Panther Sounds; Dirty Hit
- Members: Ruben Radlauer; Jack Wetmore; Aaron Shapiro; Cole Haden
- Website: modelactriz.com

Model/Actriz is an American rock band, formed in 2016 in Boston, Massachusetts, that is currently based in Brooklyn, New York. The group consists of drummer Ruben Radlauer, guitarist Jack Wetmore, vocalist Cole Haden, and bassist Aaron Shapiro.

The band's music has been described as post-punk, noise rock and industrial rock. Frontman Haden often incorporates queer sexual themes in his lyrics "as a gay person working in a genre that’s not very outwardly gay." Their debut album Dogsbody was released in 2023, followed by their second album Pirouette in 2025.

== History ==
Drummer Ruben Radlauer and guitarist Jack Wetmore were childhood acquaintances whose fathers were in a band together in the 1980s. Radlauer and Wetmore reconnected while attending Berklee College of Music, and decided to start a band together. In 2015, Radlauer and Wetmore met vocalist Cole Haden when they saw him perform, "writhing on the floor in a corset, fake blood dripping down his face," and invited him to join their band. Haden, a Delaware native, joined the group out of loneliness. In 2019, after a two-year hiatus, Model/Actriz incorporated bassist Aaron Shapiro.

In 2019, Model/Actriz was dubbed one of Alt Citizen's favorite live acts of the year. In 2020, the band was scheduled to perform at SXSW, but the festival was cancelled due to the COVID-19 pandemic. In 2021, Model/Actriz recorded their first album, Dogsbody, released in 2023. It earned an 8.2 rating from Pitchfork, and was named Bandcamp Daily's album of the day. Following Dogsbody, the band was invited to play the 2024 Primavera Sound festival in Barcelona.

The band's second album Pirouette was released on May 2, 2025. The lead single "Cinderella" was released on February 25, 2025 and earned a "Best New Track" honor from Pitchfork. It was followed by the singles "Doves" and "Diva". In April 2025, Haden expanded into songwriting for other artists, co-writing "Prelude", the opening track for Miley Cyrus's ninth studio album Something Beautiful (2025).

In March 2026, they released a surprise EP, Swan Songs. In April 2026, they performed at Coachella for the first time.

In September 2026, the band contributed significantly to Miley Cyrus' tenth studio album, Bass Persuades. The band is featured on "Different Religion" and contributed to five other songs from the record which marked a continuation of the band's work with Cyrus, following Haden's contribution to her previous record.

== Critical response ==
In 2016 Boston Hassle wrote that guitarist Wetmore and drummer Radlauer "remarkably capture a wide scope of dissonance and noise with live belligerence, with control and spontaneity." Vocalist Haden has been praised by multiple publications for his onstage charisma. In 2022, Fatty Strap stated, "[Haden’s] presence is so big that it literally arrives before him and leaves days after he has left." Rolling Stone wrote, "Every time they perform, it’s an explosion of outrageous noise, raw physicality, and communal joy." The Primavera Sound festival praised them as "pioneers in bringing homoerotic references into a genre as un-homoerotic as post-punk."

== Band members ==
- Cole Haden – vocals (2016–2017, 2019–present)
- Jack Wetmore – guitar (2016–2017, 2019–present)
- Aaron Shapiro – bass guitar (2019–present)
- Ruben Radlauer – drums (2016–2017, 2019–present)

== Discography ==
Albums
Title	Year	Label	Source
Dogsbody	2023	True Panther Sounds	
Pirouette	2025	True Panther Sounds / Dirty Hit	

Extended Plays
Title	Year	Source
100€	2016	
Ava	2016	
No	2017	
Swan Songs	2026	

Singles
Title	Year	Source
"Suntan"	2020	
"Damocles"	2020	
"Mosquito"	2022	
"Crossing Guard"	2023	
"Winnipesaukee”	2023	
"Cinderella”	2025	
"Doves"	2025	
"Diva"	2025	

Guest appearances
Title	Year	Other artist(s)	Album
"Different Religion"	2026	Miley Cyrus	Bass Persuades
"Bass Persuades Remixx"	2026	Miley Cyrus	Bass Persuades
