= Dogsbody (album) =

Studio album by Model/Actriz
- Released: 24 February 2023
- Studio: Machines with Magnets (Pawtucket)
- Genre: Noise rock
- Length: 37:52
- Label: True Panther
- Producers: Seth Manchester; Model/Actriz

Model/Actriz chronology
No (2017)	Dogsbody (2023)	Pirouette (2025)

Singles from Dogsbody
- 1. "Mosquito" Released: November 2, 2022; 2. "Crossing Guard" Released: January 17, 2023; 3. "Amaranth" Released: February 1, 2023

Dogsbody is the debut studio album by American band Model/Actriz. The album was released on February 24, 2023, through True Panther Sounds.

== Background ==
The album has been recorded since 2021. In an interview with Document Journal, frontman Cole Haden described it as "picking up my damn body from all of those times, not knowing what really was meant by all of that suffering… This album is the reason for having experienced all of that." Model/Actriz said that Dogsbody recorded with afar from the atmosphere of previous EPs.

Haden, who is openly gay, said that the lyrics were in part inspired by the musical Cats because it "filled [him] with sexual vigor and terror." According to Haden, "as a gay person working in a genre that’s not very outwardly gay, the album is very gay. And when people from the queer community are relating to it, that makes me feel proud of the thing that we made."

== Critical reception ==
Professional ratings
Review scores
Source	Rating
Beats Per Minute	85%
Pitchfork	8.2/10
Sputnikmusic	2.8/5

Jayson Greene of Pitchfork reviewed "Dogsbody is the perfect foil to frontman Cole Haden’s white-hot charisma", and gave it a "Best New Music" designation. John Wohlmacher of Beats Per Minute said, "With Haden’s starkly poetic lyrics and borderline crazed delivery comes a counter-position to the harsh music, creating a unique tension that no other group from the American post-no wave scene generated." Dogsbody won "Best Heavy Record" at the 2024 Libera Awards.

=== Accolades ===
Publication	List	Rank	Ref.
Exclaim!	Exclaim!'s 50 Best Albums of 2023	23	
Pitchfork	The 50 Best Albums of 2023	33	
Rolling Stone	The 100 Best Albums of 2023	31	

== Track listing ==
All lyrics are written by Cole Haden; all music is composed by Model/Actriz.

Dogsbody track listing
No.	Title	Length
1.	"Donkey Show"	3:10
2.	"Mosquito"	3:12
3.	"Crossing Guard"	4:44
4.	"Slate"	3:23
5.	"Divers"	4:00
6.	"Amaranth"	3:37
7.	"Pure Mode"	3:07
8.	"Maria"	3:26
9.	"Sleepless"	5:49
10.	"Sun In"	3:24

== Personnel ==
=== Model/Actriz ===
- Cole Haden – vocals, production
- Jack Wetmore – guitar, production, trash can on "Mosquito"
- Aaron Shapiro – bass, production
- Ruben Radlauer – drums, production, additional engineering on "Sleepless"

=== Additional contributors ===
- Seth Manchester – production, mixing, engineering, tape machine on "Sleepless"
- Matt Colton – mastering
- Eric Chen – hand claps on "Donkey Show"
- Chase Cegile – tenor saxophone on "Donkey Show"
- Leia Jospé – cover photo
- Rusty Snyder – cover props
- Abril J. Barajas – cover ceramic
- Jesse Osborne-Lanthier – additional artwork, layout, design
