= Pirouette (Model/Actriz album) =

Studio album by Model/Actriz
- Released: 2 May 2025
- Studios: Machines with Magnets, Pawtucket, Rhode Island; The Cutting Room, New York City; Studio G, New York City
- Genres: Dance-punk; noise rock
- Length: 40:43
- Label: True Panther
- Producers: Seth Manchester; Model/Actriz

Model/Actriz chronology
Dogsbody (2023)	Pirouette (2025)

Singles from Pirouette
- 1. "Cinderella" Released: February 25, 2025; 2. "Doves" Released: March 25, 2025; 3. "Diva" Released: April 21, 2025

Pirouette is the second studio album by the American noise rock and dance-punk band Model/Actriz. Released on May 2, 2025, by the independent record label True Panther Sounds, the album has been widely praised by music critics. The lead single "Cinderella" was released on February 25, 2025, as a teaser, followed by the singles "Doves" and "Diva".

Pirouette marks somewhat of a change from the abrasive and "everything is a drum" sound of their widely acclaimed 2023 debut Dogsbody, which emphasised attack, noise and rhythm. While retaining most of those sounds, including the emphasis on simple but dominant bass guitar patterns and aggressive hi-hat rhythms, Pirouette further incorporates elements of dance music, electronic effects, and the theatrics of cabaret.

== Music and lyrics ==
The band commenced conceptualising and writing the songs for the album during the 2023 tour in support of their debut, Dogsbody. They were at the time listening to a lot of techno and house music, which drummer Ruben Radlauer said seeped into their playing. In a press release accompanying the album, they described Pirouette as "a collection of the brightest, most danceable, and most personal songs we've ever made."

Lead singer Cole Haden cites the singers Janet Jackson, Kylie Minogue and Miley Cyrus as inspirations for the album's lyrical tone and imagery. He has said that the lyrics in part document a coming out story, whereas Dogsbody was more about suppressed feelings and shame.

The musicians in the band name underground electronic acts such as Burial and Floating Points as influences.

== Release ==
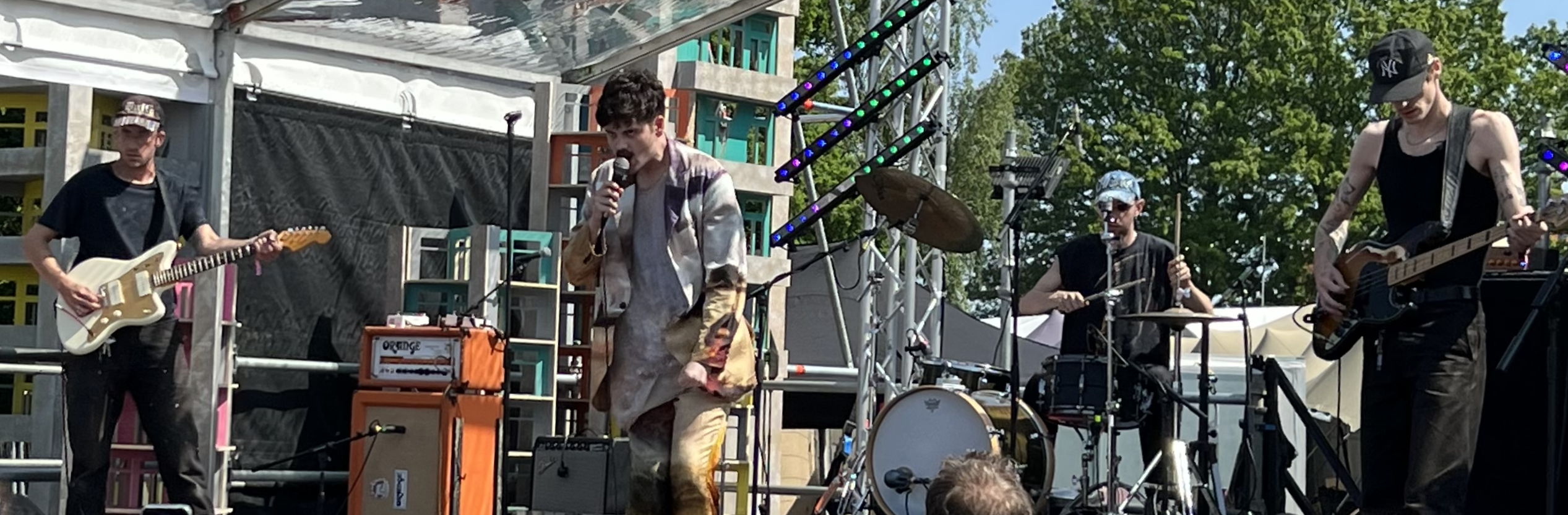
Model/Actriz performing live in 2023. Left to right: Jack Wetmore, Cole Haden, Ruben Radlauer, Aaron Shapiro.

"Pirouette" was released on May 2, 2025, by True Panther Sounds in the US and by Dirty Hit in the rest of the world.

The lead single "Cinderella" was released on February 25, 2025, accompanied by a high-camp music video directed by Nathan Castiel. The video reimagines the ballroom of the original Cinderella fairytale as rave in contemporary Brooklyn, NYC, where Model/Actriz are based. The band's musicians appear dressed as the titular character's "Ugly Stepsisters". Haden said that the song is reflective of the album as a whole as it "switches between moments of tension and fluidity, dissonance and harmony".

The single was well received. Writing for Stereogum, the critic Abby Jones noted the parallels between the video and the song's lyrics, in which Haden describes "wanting to have a princess-themed birthday party as a young child before nixing the idea, presumably due to some external shame". In a review for Paste, the critic Matt Mitchell described it as "industrial, clubby and sensationally hedonistic."

"Cinderella" was followed by the singles "Doves" on March 25 and "Diva" on April 21, 2025.

== Reception ==
Professional ratings
Aggregate scores
Source	Rating
AnyDecentMusic?	8.0/10
Metacritic	81/100
Review scores
Source	Rating
Clash	8/10
DIY	4/5 stars
Exclaim!	9/10
The Guardian	4/5 stars
The Line of Best Fit	7/10
Pitchfork	7.1/10

Early reviews were very positive. Writing for The Guardian, the critic Alexis Petridis gave the album 4 out of 5 stars, and wrote that "the album largely thrives on thrilling contrasts: between the band’s tendency to cacophony and the taut control with which they play; between the sweetness of the tunes and the pummelling din behind them", and praised guitarist Jack Wetmore's in particular on "Cinderella". He also noted that the album contains some concessions to melody over noise and rhythm, writing that the tracks "Acid Rain" and "Baton" are "straightforwardly beautiful".

Liam Hess of Vogue called the album a "a thrilling exercise in controlled chaos: the pummeling kick drum and relentless forward motion of a silvery guitar on opening track 'Vespers', the clattering percussion and preening lyrics of 'Diva', the whirling electric fuzz and meticulously calibrated call-and-response of 'Departures'." Hess went on to write that the record "marks a subtle sonic pivot, as the band leans further into their pop instincts and Haden’s knack for a cheeky, winking lyric."

John Amen of The Line of Best Fit complimented the band's "emotional and sonic versatility" but added that "the tracks occasionally feel elusive or oddly impalpable". He concluded, "All in all, Pirouette is an intriguing segue album. Even if it falls short of the cogency displayed on Dogsbody, Model/Actriz should be applauded for their creative restlessness, the risks they wholeheartedly take."

== Track listing ==
All lyrics are written by Cole Haden; all music is composed by Model/Actriz.

Pirouette track listing
No.	Title	Length
1.	"Vespers"	3:25
2.	"Cinderella"	4:34
3.	"Poppy"	3:37
4.	"Diva"	4:16
5.	"Headlights"	1:33
6.	"Acid Rain"	5:24
7.	"Departures"	4:31
8.	"Audience"	2:55
9.	"Ring Road"	2:03
10.	"Doves"	4:11
11.	"Baton"	4:14

== Personnel ==
Credits adapted from the album's liner notes.

=== Model/Actriz ===
- Cole Haden – vocals, production
- Jack Wetmore – guitar, production
- Aaron Shapiro – bass, production
- Ruben Radlauer – drums, production

=== Other credits ===
- Seth Manchester – production, mixing, engineering
- Hayden Ticehurst – additional engineering
- Bobby Tiemann – additional engineering
- Matt Colton – mastering
- Rusty Snyder – creative direction, photography
- Eddie Mandell – art direction, design
- Chase Shewbridge – art direction, design

== Charts ==
Chart performance for Pirouette
Chart (2025)	Peak position
UK Album Downloads (Official Charts)	38
UK Independent Albums (Official Charts)	34
