= Maxx Morando =

1. REDIRECT Liily
