= List of The Late Show with Stephen Colbert episodes (2025) =

- No. of episodes: 153

Release
- Original network: CBS
- Original release: January 6 – December 18, 2025

Season chronology
- ← Previous; 2024 episodes Next → 2026 episodes

The following is a list of episodes of The Late Show with Stephen Colbert that aired in 2025.

== 2025 ==
=== January ===
No.	Original release date	Guest(s)	Musical/entertainment guest(s)
1585	January 6, 2025	Representative Adam Kinzinger	Jon Batiste
The Late Show Presents: The Sound of Science. Representative Adam Kinzinger discusses recent politics and The Last Republican. Jon Batiste performs a special arrangement from his album Beethoven Blues.
1586	January 7, 2025	Tilda Swinton, Isabella Rossellini	N/A
Stephen acknowledges the death of Jimmy Carter. Ooh Ooh! Ah! Ah! Update! Monkey Merchportunity. Prove It! Tilda Swinton discusses The Room Next Door. Isabella Rossellini discusses Conclave.
1587	January 8, 2025	Alan Cumming, Diane Morgan	N/A
Stephen acknowledges the wildfires currently happening in Los Angeles. Late Show Presents: Meanwhile. Alan Cumming discusses The Traitors. Diane Morgan discusses Cunk on Life.
1588	January 9, 2025	Ben Stiller, June Squibb	N/A
Stephen acknowledges the wildfires currently happening in Los Angeles. Severance: The Lost Scenes of Steve C. (special appearances by Tramell Tillman, John Turturro and Adam Scott; segment rebroadcast from August 11, 2022 episode). Ben Stiller discusses Severance. June Squibb discusses Thelma.
1589	January 13, 2025	Jeremy Bash, David Schwimmer, Kwame Alexander	N/A
Jeremy Bash discusses the upcoming TikTok ban in the United States. David Schwimmer discusses Goosebumps. Kwame Alexander discusses his new book, How Sweet the Sound.
1590	January 14, 2025	Josh Gad, Betty Gilpin	N/A
Late Show Presents: Meanwhile. Josh Gad discusses his new book, In Gad We Trust. Betty Gilpin discusses American Primeval.
1591	January 15, 2025	Adam Scott, Secretary of the Treasury Janet Yellen	N/A
Cyborgasm. Adam Scott discusses Severance. Secretary of the Treasury Janet Yellen discusses recent politics.
1592	January 16, 2025	Kate Winslet, Jharrel Jerome	N/A
Stephen acknowledges the death of David Lynch. Late Show Presents: Meanwhile. Kate Winslet takes "The Colbert Questionert" (new footage from September 24, 2024 episode). Jharrel Jerome discusses Unstoppable.
1593	January 20, 2025	Jon Favreau, Jon Lovett and Tommy Vietor	Jalen Ngonda
Jon Favreau, Jon Lovett and Tommy Vietor discuss recent politics. Jalen Ngonda performs "If You Don't Want My Love" from his album Come Around and Love Me.
1594	January 21, 2025	Michelle Yeoh, Britt Lower	N/A
Late Show Presents: Meanwhile. Michelle Yeoh discusses Star Trek: Section 31. Britt Lower discusses Severance.
1595	January 22, 2025	John Dickerson	Willow Avalon
Stephen Colbert Hates All Children! (special appearance by Janet Yellen). John Dickerson discusses recent politics. Willow Avalon performs "Homewrecker" from her album Southern Belle Raisin' Hell.
1596	January 23, 2025	Drew Brees, Morris Chestnut	N/A
Late Show Email In-Bag, with Stephen's wife, Evie. Drew Brees discusses this season's NFL playoffs. Morris Chestnut discusses Watson.
1597	January 26, 2025	Deion Sanders	Kane Brown
Special episode following the AFC Championship game between the Kansas City Chiefs and the Buffalo Bills. Air Lithgow (special appearance by John Lithgow). Late Show Presents: Meanwhile. Deion Sanders discusses Coach Prime. Kane Brown performs "Fiddle in the Band" from his album The High Road.
1598	January 27, 2025	Chris Hayes	Nicole Scherzinger
Late Show Presents: Meanwhile. Chris Hayes discusses recent politics and his new book, The Sirens' Call. Nicole Scherzinger performs "As If We Never Said Goodbye" from Sunset Boulevard.
1599	January 28, 2025	Drew Barrymore, Brandon Scott Jones	N/A
Ooh Ooh! Ah! Ah! Update! Romansplaining with Stephen Colbert. Drew Barrymore discusses Hollywood Squares. Brandon Scott Jones discusses Ghosts.
1600	January 29, 2025	Will Ferrell	FLO
Will Ferrell discusses You're Cordially Invited and the upcoming 20th anniversary of Bewitched. FLO performs "AAA" from their album Access All Areas.
1601	January 30, 2025	Nicole Kidman, Jacob Soboroff	N/A
Stephen acknowledges the mid-air collision over the Potomac River. Late Show Presents: Meanwhile. Nicole Kidman takes "The Colbert Questionert" (new footage from December 16, 2024 episode). Jacob Soboroff discusses the Southern California wildfires and Separated.

=== February ===
No.	Original release date	Guest(s)	Musical/entertainment guest(s)
1602	February 3, 2025	Lin-Manuel Miranda, Audra McDonald	N/A
Late Show Presents: Meanwhile. Lin-Manuel Miranda discusses All In: Comedy About Love. Audra McDonald discusses Gypsy.
1603	February 4, 2025	Samantha Power, Miles Teller, W. Kamau Bell	N/A
Samantha Power discusses the Department of Government Efficiency's intention of shutting down the United States Agency for International Development. Miles Teller discusses The Gorge. W. Kamau Bell discusses his new comedy tour, Who's With Me?
1604	February 5, 2025	Damon Wayans Jr., Daniel Boulud	N/A
First Drafts: Valentine's Day Cards, with Stephen's wife, Evie. Damon Wayans Jr. discusses Poppa's House. Daniel Boulud steps into the kitchen with Stephen.
1605	February 6, 2025	Elton John, Melanie Lynskey	Leon Thomas
Late Show Presents: Meanwhile. Elton John takes "The Colbert Questionert" (new footage from December 17, 2024 episode). Melanie Lynskey discusses Yellowjackets. Leon Thomas performs "MUTT" from his album of the same name.
1606	February 17, 2025	John Oliver	The War and Treaty
Late Show Family Meeting with John Oliver. John Oliver discusses Last Week Tonight. The War and Treaty perform "Mr. Fun" from their album Plus One.
1607	February 18, 2025	George Clooney, Alan Ritchson	N/A
Late Show Presents: Meanwhile. Meanwhile Presents: Animal in the Human Place: All Seals Edition! George Clooney discusses Good Night, and Good Luck. Alan Ritchson discusses Reacher.
1608	February 19, 2025	Robert De Niro, Tamara Tunie	N/A
New Black History Month (special appearance by Tim Meadows). Prove It! Robert De Niro discusses the 40th anniversary of Brazil and Zero Day. Tamara Tunie discusses Beyond the Gates.
1609	February 20, 2025	Al Roker, Monica Lewinsky	N/A
Late Show Presents: Meanwhile. Al Roker discusses his new book, Recipes to Live By. Monica Lewinsky discusses her new podcast, Reclaiming.
1610	February 24, 2025	Woody Harrelson, Wendell Pierce	N/A
Stephen acknowledges the death of Roberta Flack. A special edition of Rescue Dog Rescue (special appearance by Sam Waterston). Woody Harrelson discusses Last Breath. Wendell Pierce discusses Elsbeth.
1611	February 25, 2025	Drew Barrymore, Bong Joon-ho	N/A
Late Show Presents: Meanwhile. Drew Barrymore takes "The Colbert Questionert" (new footage from January 28, 2025 episode). Bong Joon-ho discusses Mickey 17 and its companion book, The Art And Making of Mickey 17.
1612	February 26, 2025	Guy Fieri, Pamela Brown	N/A
First Drafts: Black History Month Cards, with Late Show writer John Thibodeaux. Guy Fieri discusses Tournament of Champions and his work at the Guy Fieri Foundation. Pamela Brown discusses recent politics and her new role on The Situation Room with Wolf Blitzer.
1613	February 27, 2025	RZA	Paul Mecurio, Father John Misty
Late Show Presents: Meanwhile. RZA discusses his farewell tour, "Wu-Tang Forever: The Final Chamber". Paul Mecurio gives a stand-up performance. Father John Misty performs "The Dead Mouse One" from his new album Mahashmashana.

=== March ===
No.	Original release date	Guest(s)	Musical/entertainment guest(s)
1614	March 3, 2025	Brian Tyree Henry, Tony Hawk	N/A
A cameo appearance by Laura Benanti as Melania Trump. Brian Tyree Henry discusses Dope Thief. Tony Hawk discusses the remastered versions of Tony Hawk's Pro Skater 3 and 4.
1615	March 4, 2025	Pete Buttigieg	N/A
Special live episode following the Presidential Address to Congress. MAGA Maniacs. Late Show Presents: Meanwhile. Pete Buttigieg discusses recent politics.
1616	March 5, 2025	Jake Tapper	Paris Paloma
The Late Show Presents: The Sound of Science. Jake Tapper discusses recent politics and United States of Scandal. Paris Paloma performs "Labour" from her album Cacophony, with the Resistance Revival Chorus providing musical accompaniment.
1617	March 6, 2025	Sterling K. Brown, Reid Hoffman	N/A
Late Show Presents: Meanwhile. Sterling K. Brown discusses Paradise. Reid Hoffman discusses recent politics and his new book, Superagency.
1618	March 10, 2025	Cate Blanchett, Tramell Tillman	N/A
Peter Frampton sits in with the band and provides musical accompaniment. Huxon Financial. Late Show Presents: Meanwhile. Cate Blanchett discusses Black Bag. Tramell Tillman discusses Severance.
1619	March 11, 2025	Nathan Lane, Ezra Klein	N/A
What's Going On Over There? Nathan Lane acknowledges the death of Gene Hackman and discusses Mid-Century Modern. Ezra Klein discusses recent politics and his new book, Abundance.
1620	March 12, 2025	Michael Fassbender, Uzo Aduba	The Voidz
Michael Fassbender discusses Black Bag. Uzo Aduba discusses The Residence. The Voidz perform "Blue Demon" from their upcoming EP, Megz of Ram.
1621	March 13, 2025	Gary Oldman	N/A
Gary Oldman discusses Slow Horses.
1622	March 24, 2025	Jake Gyllenhaal, Roxane Gay	N/A
Late Show Presents: Meanwhile. Jake Gyllenhaal discusses Othello. Roxane Gay discusses her new book, The Portable Feminist Reader.
1623	March 25, 2025	Jenna Ortega	Erin Maguire, Megan Moroney
Consumer Watch. Consumer Watch Presents: TurboTax for Kids. Jenna Ortega discusses Klara and the Sun and Death of a Unicorn. Erin Maguire gives a stand-up performance. Megan Moroney performs "Break It Right Back" from her album Am I Okay? (I'll Be Fine).
1624	March 26, 2025	Seth Rogen, Chris Hemsworth	N/A
Breaking News: Pete Hegseth's Cocka-Yemeni Group Chat Whoopsa-Houthi Bloopers. Rescue Dog Rescue with Seth Rogen. Seth Rogen discusses The Studio. Chris Hemsworth takes "The Colbert Questionert" (new footage from May 23, 2024 episode). Stephen Colbert acknowledges the cancellation of After Midnight.
1625	March 27, 2025	Senator Chuck Schumer, Michelle Buteau	N/A
Breaking News: New Phone Who Dis on the Houthi Chat Boom Boom Ruh-Roh Room. Senator Chuck Schumer discusses recent politics and his new book, Antisemitism in America. Michelle Buteau discusses Survival of the Thickest.
1626	March 31, 2025	Maurice DuBois, Jonathan Groff	N/A
A Tariff Carol. Late Show Presents: Stephen Colbert's Mature Content for Kids! (special appearance by Guy Fieri). Maurice DuBois discusses his new role on the CBS Evening News and recent politics. Jonathan Groff discusses Just in Time.

=== April ===
No.	Original release date	Guest(s)	Musical/entertainment guest(s)
1627	April 1, 2025	Michelle Williams, Max Thieriot	N/A
Nels Cline sits in with the band and provides musical accompaniment. Late Show Presents: Meanwhile. Michelle Williams discusses Dying for Sex. Max Thieriot discusses Fire Country.
1628	April 2, 2025	Pierce Brosnan, Hannah Einbinder	N/A
The Late Show Presents: The Sound of Science. Pierce Brosnan discusses MobLand and the upcoming 30th anniversary of GoldenEye. Hannah Einbender discusses Hacks.
1629	April 3, 2025	Noah Wyle, Jenny Slate	N/A
Late Show Presents: Meanwhile. Noah Wyle discusses The Pitt. Jenny Slate discusses Dying for Sex.
1630	April 7, 2025	Senator Cory Booker, Jalen Brunson	N/A
FamDuel (special appearance by Keegan-Michael Key). Senator Cory Booker discusses recent politics. Jalen Brunson discusses his NCAA championship wins and the current New York Knicks season.
1631	April 8, 2025	Woody Harrelson, Michael Lewis	N/A
Military Parade for a Dictator’s Birthday! Late Show Presents: Meanwhile. Woody Harrelson takes "The Colbert Questionert" (new footage from February 24 episode). Michael Lewis discusses recent politics and his new book, Who Is Government?
1632	April 9, 2025	Sheryl Lee Ralph, Paul W. Downs	Scowl
We're Rich!! Sheryl Lee Ralph discusses Abbott Elementary. Paul W. Downs discusses Hacks. Scowl performs "Tonight (I’m Afraid)" from their album Are We All Angels.
1633	April 14, 2025	Sarah Snook, Melinda French Gates	N/A
Late Show Presents: Meanwhile. Sarah Snook discusses The Picture of Dorian Gray. Melinda French Gates discusses her new book, The Next Day: Transitions, Change, and Moving Forward.
1634	April 15, 2025	David Oyelowo, Finn Wolfhard	OK Go
The Tariff Fairy. "Billionaires Are Actually Good" (special appearance by Alan Cumming). David Oyelowo discusses Government Cheese. Finn Wolfhard discusses Hell of a Summer. OK Go performs "Love" from their album And the Adjacent Possible.
1635	April 16, 2025	Senator Elizabeth Warren	St. Vincent
First Drafts: Easter Cards, with Stephen's wife, Evie. Senator Elizabeth Warren discusses recent politics. St. Vincent performs "Violent Times" from her album All Born Screaming.
1636	April 17, 2025	Senator Raphael Warnock, Joe Manganiello	N/A
Planet Earth Jr. We Found Aliens! Late Show Presents: Meanwhile. Senator Raphael Warnock discusses recent politics and his new book, We’re in This Together: Leo’s Lunch Box. Joe Manganiello discusses Nonnas.
1637	April 28, 2025	Wanda Sykes, Cole Escola	N/A
Stephen acknowledges the death of Pope Francis. Late Show Presents: Meanwhile. Wanda Sykes discusses recent politics and her stand-up tour, Please & Thank You. Cole Escola discusses Oh, Mary!.
1638	April 29, 2025	Will Ferrell, Amber Ruffin	Jonathan Groff and the Broadway company of Just in Time
Late Show Presents: That's Gyat. Spill the Tea, Babygirl, No Cap on My Drip, Stan! Will Ferrell takes "The Colbert Questionert" (new footage from January 29 episode). Amber Ruffin discusses Have I Got News for You. Jonathan Groff and the Broadway company of Just in Time perform "Beyond the Sea".
1639	April 30, 2025	Jen Psaki	d4vd
Prove It! Jen Psaki discusses recent politics, The Briefing with Jen Psaki, and her new book, Say More. d4vd performs "Feel It" from his album Withered.

=== May ===
No.	Original release date	Guest(s)	Musical/entertainment guest(s)
1640	May 1, 2025	Walton Goggins, John McWhorter	N/A
100 Men Cam. Late Show Presents: Meanwhile. Walton Goggins discusses The Righteous Gemstones. John McWhorter discusses his new book, Pronoun Trouble.
1641	May 5, 2025	Jim Gaffigan, Suleika Jaouad	N/A
DraftPopes. Late Show Presents: Meanwhile. Jim Gaffigan discusses his new album, The Skinny, and Fathertime Bourbon. Suleika Jaouad discusses her new book, The Book of Alchemy.
1642	May 6, 2025	Rachel Maddow	Gillian Welch & David Rawlings
Michigan: Impossible – Great Lakening. A special appearance by Father Guido Sarducci. Rachel Maddow discusses recent politics and her new book, Prequel: An American Fight Against Fascism. Gillian Welch and David Rawlings perform "Empty Trainload of Sky" from their album Woodland.
1643	May 7, 2025	Christine Baranski, Stellan Skarsgård	N/A
Late Show Presents: Meanwhile. Christine Baranski discusses Nine Perfect Strangers. Stellan Skarsgård discusses Andor.
1644	May 8, 2025	Bill Gates	Paula Poundstone
First Drafts: Mother's Day Cards, with Stephen's wife, Evie. Bill Gates discusses recent politics and his new book, Source Code. Paula Poundstone gives a stand-up performance.
1645	May 12, 2025	Ryan Reynolds, Representative Jasmine Crockett	N/A
Scream Cam. Rescue Dog Rescue with Ryan Reynolds. Ryan Reynolds discusses Welcome to Wrexham. Representative Jasmine Crockett discusses recent politics.
1646	May 13, 2025	Father James Martin, Alexander Skarsgård, Professor Brian Cox	N/A
Father James Martin discusses the election of Pope Leo XIV and his new book, Come Forth: The Promise of Jesus's Greatest Miracle. Alexander Skarsgård discusses Murderbot. Professor Brian Cox discusses his tour, Horizons: A 21st Century Space Odyssey.
1647	May 14, 2025	Nick Kroll, Emily Osment	N/A
More Show! Late Show Presents: Meanwhile. Meanwhile Presents: Meatwhile, presented by Arby's (special appearances by Anthony Anderson and Cedric the Entertainer). Echidna Pun! Nick Kroll discusses Big Mouth. Emily Osment discusses Georgie & Mandy's First Marriage.
1648	May 15, 2025	Senator Bernie Sanders	Pavement
Senator Bernie Sanders discusses recent politics. Pavement performs "Harness Your Hopes" from their new film Pavements.
1649	May 19, 2025	Angela Bassett, Bradley Whitford	N/A
Pope My Ride. Stephen acknowledges Joe Biden's cancer diagnosis. Late Show Presents: The Sound of Science. Angela Bassett discusses Mission: Impossible – The Final Reckoning. Bradley Whitford discusses The Handmaid's Tale.
1650	May 20, 2025	James Comey, Meghann Fahy	N/A
Late Show Presents: Meanwhile. James Comey discusses recent politics and his new book, FDR Drive. Meghann Fahy discusses Sirens.
1651	May 21, 2025	Natalie Portman, Dawn Staley	Wednesday
Buddy Guy sits in with the band and provides musical accompaniment. Summertime Fum Time! Natalie Portman discusses Fountain of Youth. Dawn Staley discusses her new book, Uncommon Favor. Wednesday performs "Elderberry Wine".
1652	May 22, 2025	Paul Giamatti	Audra McDonald and the Broadway company of Gypsy
Taken 4: Monkey Seize, Monkey Doomed. Late Show Presents: Meanwhile. Paul Giamatti discusses Black Mirror. Audra McDonald and the Broadway company of Gypsy perform "Some People".

=== June ===
No.	Original release date	Guest(s)	Musical/entertainment guest(s)
1653	June 2, 2025	Jean Smart, Governor Josh Stein	N/A
Are Men OK? Jean Smart discusses Hacks and Call Me Izzy. Governor Josh Stein discusses recent politics and the effects of Hurricane Helene in North Carolina.
1654	June 3, 2025	Former New Zealand Prime Minister Jacinda Ardern	King Princess
Late Show Presents: Meanwhile. Former Prime Minister Jacinda Ardern discusses Prime Minister and her new book, A Different Kind of Power. King Princess performs "RIP KP".
1655	June 4, 2025	Mark Hamill, Cristin Milioti	N/A
Rescue Dog Rescue with Mark Hamill. Mark Hamill discusses The Life of Chuck. Cristin Milioti discusses The Penguin.
1656	June 5, 2025	Cynthia Erivo, Tony Gilroy	Cynthia Erivo
Couples Therapy. Cynthia Erivo discusses her upcoming hosting gig for the 78th Tony Awards. Tony Gilroy discusses Andor. Cynthia Erivo performs "Best for Me" from her new album I Forgive You.
1657	June 9, 2025	William Shatner & Neil deGrasse Tyson	The Doobie Brothers
First Drafts: Father's Day Cards, with Stephen's wife, Evie. William Shatner and Neil deGrasse Tyson discusses their live tour, Rocking: The Universe is Absurd. The Doobie Brothers perform "Learn to Let Go" from their album Walk This Road.
1658	June 10, 2025	Nicolle Wallace, Cyndi Lauper	N/A
The ICE Protests. Prove It! (special appearance by Rick Pitino). Nicolle Wallace discusses recent politics and her podcast, The Best People. Cyndi Lauper discusses the Girls Just Wanna Have Fun Farewell Tour.
1659	June 11, 2025	Colman Domingo, The Cast of Slow Horses	N/A
Late Show Presents: Meanwhile. Colman Domingo discusses The Four Seasons and his play, Lights Out: Nat "King" Cole. The cast of Slow Horses (Gary Oldman, Jack Lowden, Kristin Scott Thomas and Jonathan Pryce) discusses the series.
1660	June 12, 2025	John C. Reilly, Eva Victor	N/A
Late Show Presents: The Sound of Science. John C. Reilly discusses his new album, What's Not to Love?. Eva Victor discusses Sorry, Baby.
1661	June 16, 2025	Mariska Hargitay, Senator Tammy Duckworth	N/A
Late Show Presents: Meanwhile. Mariska Hargitay discusses My Mom Jayne. Senator Tammy Duckworth discusses recent politics.
1662	June 17, 2025	Nate Bargatze, Kerry Condon	N/A
Pizza-Gate. What's Going On Over There? Nate Bargatze discusses his new book, Big Dumb Eyes: Stories from a Simpler Mind. Kerry Condon discusses F1.
1663	June 18, 2025	Allison Williams, Damson Idris	Model/Actriz
Allison Williams discusses M3GAN 2.0. Damson Idris discusses F1. Model/Actriz performs "Cinderella" from their album Pirouette.
1664	June 19, 2025	Paul Simon, Representative Maxwell Frost	Paul Simon
Courage Cam. Paul Simon discusses his career as a singer-songwriter. Representative Maxwell Frost discusses recent politics. Paul Simon performs "The Sacred Harp" from his 2023 album, Seven Psalms, with Edie Brickell providing musical accompaniment.
1665	June 23, 2025	Idris Elba; Brad Lander & Zohran Mamdani	N/A
Idris Elba discusses Heads of State. Brad Lander & Zohran Mamdani discuss running in the 2025 New York City mayoral election.
1666	June 24, 2025	John Cena, Lorde	N/A
Community Calendar: West Newbury, Massachusetts with John Cena. John Cena discusses Heads of State and announces his retirement from WWE. Lorde discusses her new album, Virgin.
1667	June 25, 2025	Clarissa Ward, Michael C. Hall	Sienna Spiro
Clarissa Ward discusses recent politics. Michael C. Hall discusses Dexter: Resurrection. Sienna Spiro performs "Maybe" from her EP Sink Now, Swim Later.

=== July ===
No.	Original release date	Guest(s)	Musical/entertainment guest(s)
1668	July 14, 2025	Stephen A. Smith, Liza Colón-Zayas	N/A
Behind the 'Stache. #ColbertSmallBizBump. Stephen A. Smith discusses his potential presidential campaign in 2028 and his two new shows on SiriusXM. Liza Colón-Zayas discusses The Bear.
1669	July 15, 2025	Joaquin Phoenix, Meg Stalter	N/A
Joaquin Phoenix discusses Eddington and his previous appearance on Late Show with David Letterman. Meg Stalter discusses Too Much.
1670	July 16, 2025	Owen Wilson, Dr. Francis Collins	N/A
Missing 2:53. Late Show Presents: Meanwhile. Owen Wilson takes "The Colbert Questionert". Dr. Francis Collins discusses recent politics and his new book, The Road to Wisdom.
1671	July 17, 2025	Senator Adam Schiff, Anthony Carrigan	Noah Cyrus
Stephen acknowledges CBS' cancellation of The Late Show. Things I've Been Thinking About Since 1985 Cam. Senator Adam Schiff discusses recent politics. Anthony Carrigan discusses Superman. Noah Cyrus performs "Way of the World" from her album I Want My Loved Ones to Go with Me.
1672	July 21, 2025	Sandra Oh, Dave Franco	N/A
Eloquence Cam. "Weird Al" Yankovic and Lin-Manuel Miranda perform a rendition of Coldplay's "Viva la Vida" in a segment that features an audience of celebrities and some of Stephen's fellow late-night hosts (special appearances by Anderson Cooper, Andy Cohen, Jimmy Fallon, Seth Meyers, Christopher McDonald, Robert Smigel as Triumph the Insult Comic Dog, Adam Sandler, John Oliver and Jon Stewart). Sandra Oh discusses Twelfth Night at Shakespeare in the Park. Dave Franco discusses Together.
1673	July 22, 2025	Bad Bunny, Leanne Morgan	N/A
Beef-mergency. Grace Potter sits in with the band and provides musical accompaniment. Stephen thanks the celebrity guest cameos from the previous episode. Late Show Presents: Meanwhile. Bad Bunny discusses Happy Gilmore 2. Leanne Morgan discusses Leanne.
1674	July 23, 2025	Steve Buscemi, Molly Gordon	N/A
Corn Sweat. Whitlock's Hot Air Balloon with Steve Buscemi. Steve Buscemi discusses Wednesday. Molly Gordon discusses Oh, Hi!
1675	July 24, 2025	Governor Josh Shapiro	Alex G
1-555-EYE-POKERS. Stephen acknowledges the death of Chuck Mangione. Prove It! Governor Josh Shapiro discusses recent politics and the 2025 Pennsylvania Governor's Residence arson. Alex G performs "Afterlife" from his album Headlights.
1676	July 28, 2025	Matt Rogers & Bowen Yang; Ocean Vuong	N/A
Late Show Presents: Meanwhile. Matt Rogers & Bowen Yang discuss Las Culturistas. Ocean Vuong discusses his new book, The Emperor of Gladness.
1677	July 29, 2025	Jamie Lee Curtis	Rachael & Vilray
Late Show Email In-Bag, with Stephen's wife, Evie. Jamie Lee Curtis discusses Freakier Friday. Rachael & Vilray perform "Off Broadway" from their new album, West of Broadway, with the Late Show Band providing musical accompaniment.
1678	July 30, 2025	Liam Neeson, Senator Elissa Slotkin	N/A
Liam Neeson discusses The Naked Gun. Senator Elissa Slotkin discusses recent politics.
1679	July 31, 2025	Vice President Kamala Harris	Reneé Rapp
Vice President Kamala Harris discusses recent politics and her new book, 107 Days. Reneé Rapp performs "Shy" from her new album, Bite Me.

=== August ===
No.	Original release date	Guest(s)	Musical/entertainment guest(s)
1680	August 4, 2025	Julia Garner, Former U.S. Labor Secretary Robert Reich	N/A
Extreme Makeover: Home Edition. Presidential Fun Fact. Late Show Presents: Meanwhile. Julia Garner discusses The Fantastic Four: First Steps and Weapons. Former U.S. Labor Secretary Robert Reich discusses recent politics and his new book, Coming Up Short: A Memoir of My America.
1681	August 5, 2025	Fred Armisen, Governor JB Pritzker	N/A
Late Show Presents: The Sound of Science. Fred Armisen discusses Wednesday and his new album, 100 Sound Effects. Governor JB Pritzker discusses recent politics.
1682	August 6, 2025	Josh Brolin	The Black Keys
Late Show Presents: Meanwhile. Josh Brolin discusses Weapons. The Black Keys perform "Man on a Mission" from their album No Rain, No Flowers.
1683	August 7, 2025	Senator Alex Padilla	Louis Cato, John Scofield and Marcus Miller
Late Show Presents: Kids Pitch – Superhero Edition. Bulbo and the Strange Villain: One Little Light Can Change the World (special appearances by Tituss Burgess, John Oliver, Amanda Seyfried, Walton Goggins, Matthew Rhys, Lizzy Caplan, Steve Buscemi, Tramell Tillman and Judy Greer). Senator Alex Padilla discusses recent politics. Louis Cato, John Scofield, and Marcus Miller perform "Black Man Blues."

=== September ===
No.	Original release date	Guest(s)	Musical/entertainment guest(s)
1684	September 2, 2025	John Oliver	Joe Dombrowski
Stephen unveils his Funko Pop! figure. John Oliver discusses Last Week Tonight. Joe Dombrowski gives a stand-up performance.
1685	September 3, 2025	Jamie Lee Curtis, Carmelo Anthony	N/A
Shrimp-mergency. Jamie Lee Curtis takes "The Colbert Questionert" (new footage from July 29, 2025 episode). Carmelo Anthony discusses NBA 2K26 and his induction to the Naismith Memorial Basketball Hall of Fame.
1686	September 4, 2025	Drew Barrymore, Katherine Maher	N/A
Late Show Presents: Meanwhile. Drew Barrymore discusses The Drew Barrymore Show. Katherine Maher discusses recent politics.
1687	September 8, 2025	Cillian Murphy	Lady Gaga
It Was All a Dream: Ten Years of The Late Show with Stephen Colbert (special appearances by Julianne Moore and John Oliver). Stephen acknowledges Late Show director Jim Hoskinson's first Emmy win for Outstanding Directing for a Variety Series. A Fond Look Back on the Things Stephen Chooses to Remember. Will Ferrell discusses Zoolander 2 and "rare animals" (footage from February 7, 2016 episode). Cillian Murphy discusses Steve. Lady Gaga performs "Vanish into You" from her album Mayhem.
1688	September 9, 2025	Supreme Court Justice Sonia Sotomayor, Eugene Levy	N/A
Supreme Court Justice Sonia Sotomayor discusses recent politics and her new book, Just Shine!: How To Be A Better You. Eugene Levy discusses The Reluctant Traveler.
1689	September 10, 2025	Jennifer Aniston, Cooper Hoffman	N/A
Stephen acknowledges the assassination of Charlie Kirk. Russian Drones Are on the March. Rescue Dog Rescue with Jennifer Aniston. Jennifer Aniston discusses The Morning Show. Cooper Hoffman discusses The Long Walk.
1690	September 11, 2025	Usher, Jim Hoskinson	Mac DeMarco
Late Show Presents: Meanwhile. Usher discusses his career as a singer and the Ralph's Club New York fragrance. Jim Hoskinson discusses his career as a director and his retirement from The Late Show with Stephen Colbert. Mac DeMarco performs "Shining" from his album Guitar.
1691	September 16, 2025	Brandi Carlile, Samin Nosrat	N/A
The Clown. Stephen acknowledges The Late Show with Stephen Colbert winning the Primetime Emmy Award for Outstanding Talk Series. Late Show Presents: Meanwhile. Brandi Carlile discusses her new album, Returning to Myself. Samin Nosrat steps into the kitchen with Stephen and discusses her new book, Good Things: Recipes and Rituals with People You Love.
1692	September 17, 2025	Ron Howard, Gary Oldman	N/A
Fast & Furious 11: London Drift... Off to Sleep. Mooooon Newwwws. Ooh Ooh! Ah! Ah! Update! Ooh Ooh! Ah! Ah! Update! Presents: Under the Chimpfluence. Ron Howard discusses the 30th anniversary re-release of Apollo 13. Gary Oldman takes "The Colbert Questionert" (new footage from March 13, 2025 episode).
1693	September 18, 2025	Jake Tapper, David Remnick	N/A
Stephen Colbert, former host of The Colbert Report, returns to television to do a special segment of "The Wørd" with "Shhhhhh!". Jake Tapper discusses recent politics and his new book, Race Against Terror. David Remnick discusses recent politics and his new film, The New Yorker at 100.
1694	September 22, 2025	Scarlett Johansson, Senator Mark Kelly	N/A
Trump Hospital. Scarlett Johansson discusses Eleanor the Great. Senator Mark Kelly discusses recent politics.
1695	September 23, 2025	Governor Gavin Newsom, Priscilla Presley	N/A
Prescott Pharmaceuticals Bite Stick. Governor Gavin Newsom discusses recent politics. Priscilla Presley discusses her new book, Softly, As I Leave You.
1696	September 24, 2025	Senator Chris Murphy, Lainey Wilson	Lainey Wilson
"Escalator Sabotage". Escalator Investigator. Late Show Presents: The Sound of Science. Senator Chris Murphy discusses recent politics. Lainey Wilson discusses the deluxe edition of her album Whirlwind. Lainey Wilson performs "Somewhere Over Laredo".
1697	September 25, 2025	Jeremy Strong, Carrie Preston	N/A
Escalator Investigator. Escalator Investigator Presents: Triple Sabotage at the U.N. Escalator Investigator Presents: Teleprompter Investigompter. Escalator Investigator Presents: Ineffective Acoustics Detective Sleuth-Fix. Late Show Presents: Meanwhile. Jeremy Strong discusses The White House Effect and Springsteen: Deliver Me from Nowhere. Carrie Preston discusses Elsbeth.
1698	September 29, 2025	Conan O'Brien	The Cast of Ragtime
Senior Alert Warning System. Waregon. Conan O'Brien discusses his career, If I Had Legs I'd Kick You and Conan O'Brien Must Go. The cast of Ragtime (Joshua Henry and Nichelle Lewis) performs "Wheels of a Dream".
1699	September 30, 2025	Jimmy Kimmel, Sam Smith	N/A
Jimmy Kimmel discusses his suspension and Jimmy Kimmel Live! Kimmel's sidekick, Guillermo Rodriguez, makes a special appearance. Sam Smith discusses their residency, "To Be Free: New York City".

=== October ===
No.	Original release date	Guest(s)	Musical/entertainment guest(s)
1700	October 1, 2025	Julia Roberts	Sam Smith
Late Show Presents: Meanwhile. Julia Roberts discusses After the Hunt. Sam Smith performs "To Be Free".
1701	October 2, 2025	Lady Gaga	N/A
Trump Rx. Lady Gaga discusses Mayhem and her concert tour, "The Mayhem Ball" (interview pre-taped at The Bitter End in the Greenwich Village).
1702	October 13, 2025	Keanu Reeves & Alex Winter	JID
Stephen acknowledges the death of Diane Keaton. Keanu Reeves & Alex Winter discuss Waiting for Godot, Adulthood and Good Fortune. JID performs "Glory" from his new album, God Does Like Ugly.
1703	October 14, 2025	Bette Midler, Tim Meadows	N/A
Late Show Presents: Meanwhile. Bette Midler discusses the New York Restoration Project's annual "Hulaween" charity event. Tim Meadows discusses DMV.
1704	October 15, 2025	Anderson Cooper, Mason Thames	N/A
Anderson Cooper discusses recent politics and All There Is, Live. Mason Thames discusses Black Phone 2.
1705	October 16, 2025	Nick Offerman, José Andrés	N/A
Nathaniel Rateliff sits in with the band and provides musical accompaniment. David Ellison Appreciation Cam. Community Calendar: Minooka, Illinois with Nick Offerman. Nick Offerman discusses his new book, Little Woodchucks. José Andrés steps into the kitchen with Stephen and Nick Offerman and discusses his new restaurant, Bazaar Meat.
1706	October 20, 2025	Jeremy Renner, Karine Jean-Pierre	N/A
The Santoshank Redemption. A cameo appearance by Laura Benanti as Melania Trump. Jeremy Renner discusses Mayor of Kingstown and his new book, My Next Breath. Karine Jean-Pierre discusses her new book, Independent.
1707	October 21, 2025	Michael J. Fox, Jeff Tweedy	Jeff Tweedy
Michael J. Fox discusses the 40th anniversary of Back to the Future and his new book, Future Boy (interview pre-taped without an audience). Jeff Tweedy discusses his new album, Twilight Override. Jeff Tweedy performs "Enough".
1708	October 22, 2025	Emma Stone, Alex Wagner	N/A
So You Think You American, with Late Show writer Felipe Torres Medina. Emma Stone discusses Bugonia. Alex Wagner discusses recent politics and her new podcast, Runaway Country.
1709	October 23, 2025	Ben Stiller, Tig Notaro	N/A
"Ballroom Grift". Late Show Presents: Meanwhile. Ben Stiller discusses Stiller & Meara: Nothing Is Lost. Tig Notaro discusses Come See Me in the Good Light.
1710	October 27, 2025	Emma Thompson, Judd Apatow	Thundercat featuring Remi Wolf
Emma Thompson discusses Down Cemetery Road. Judd Apatow discusses his new book, Comedy Nerd. Thundercat performs "Children of the Baked Potato", featuring Remi Wolf.
1711	October 28, 2025	Colin Farrell, Cameron Crowe	N/A
Squirlert! Stephen Colbert's Chubby Rodent Chonk-stery. Late Show Presents: The Sound of Science. Colin Farrell discusses Ballad of a Small Player. Cameron Crowe discusses his new book, The Uncool.
1712	October 29, 2025	Sarah Paulson, Senator Ruben Gallego	N/A
Halloween 14: Ice Scream. Squirlert: Monkey 'Mergency. Ooh Ooh! Ah! Ah! Update! Late Show Presents: Meanwhile. Sarah Paulson discusses All's Fair. Senator Ruben Gallego discusses recent politics.
1713	October 30, 2025	Sir Anthony Hopkins	N/A
Sir Anthony Hopkins discusses his new book, We Did OK, Kid (interview pre-taped at a house in Los Angeles).

=== November ===
No.	Original release date	Guest(s)	Musical/entertainment guest(s)
1714	November 3, 2025	Tom Hanks	Mavis Staples
Tom Hanks discusses This World of Tomorrow. Mavis Staples performs "Human Mind" from her new album, Sad and Beautiful World.
1715	November 4, 2025	First Lady Michelle Obama, Robert Plant	N/A
First Lady Michelle Obama discusses her new book, The Look. Robert Plant discusses his new album, Saving Grace.
1716	November 5, 2025	Tiffany Haddish, Gary Cole	N/A
Late Show Presents: Meanwhile. Tiffany Haddish discusses Tiffany Haddish Goes Off. Gary Cole discusses the NCIS and NCIS: Origins crossover event.
1717	November 6, 2025	Sydney Sweeney, Patti Smith	Patti Smith
Guillermo del Toro's Frankenstein's Monster Energy Drink (special appearance by Guillermo del Toro). CSI: Criminal Sandwich Investigation. Sydney Sweeney discusses Christy. Patti Smith discusses her new book, Bread of Angels. Patti Smith performs "Peaceable Kingdom".
1718	November 10, 2025	Demi Moore, Ken Burns	N/A
Late Show Presents: The Sound of Science. Demi Moore discusses Landman. Ken Burns discusses The American Revolution.
1719	November 11, 2025	Claire Danes, Representative Jim Clyburn	N/A
Late Show Presents: Meanwhile. Claire Danes discusses The Beast in Me. Representative Jim Clyburn discusses his new book, The First Eight.
1720	November 12, 2025	Jonathan Karl, Pete Townshend	N/A
A.I. Love Country. Pete Townshend sits in with the band and provides musical accompaniment. Cyborgasm. Jonathan Karl discusses his new book, Retribution. Pete Townshend discusses Quadrophenia, A Rock Ballet.
1721	November 17, 2025	Julia Roberts, John Fogerty	John Fogerty
Now That's What I Declare Is Music. Late Show Presents: Meanwhile. Meanwhile Presents: Guess Which State This Happened In? Never Mind It's Florida. Julia Roberts takes "The Colbert Questionert" (new footage from October 1, 2025 episode). John Fogerty discusses his new album, Legacy: The Creedence Clearwater Revival Years. John Fogerty performs a medley of "Up Around the Bend", "Have You Ever Seen the Rain", "Fortunate Son", and "Proud Mary".
1722	November 18, 2025	Ted Danson, Alison Roman	N/A
Stephen Colbert Sits on Your Babies (special appearances by Charli XCX and Anderson Cooper). Ted Danson discusses A Man on the Inside. Alison Roman steps into the kitchen with Stephen and discusses her new book, Something from Nothing.
1723	November 19, 2025	Benedict Cumberbatch, Patton Oswalt	Jesse Welles
The Late Show's Refreshing Change of Subject. Benedict Cumberbatch discusses The Thing with Feathers. Patton Oswalt discusses his new stand-up special, Black Coffee and Ice Water. Jesse Welles performs "Join ICE".
1724	November 20, 2025	Senator Elizabeth Warren	Billy Strings
TURKzempic. Late Show Presents: Meanwhile. Senator Elizabeth Warren discusses recent politics. Billy Strings performs "Leaning on a Travelin' Song" from his new album, Highway Prayers.

=== December ===
No.	Original release date	Guest(s)	Musical/entertainment guest(s)
1725	December 1, 2025	Lady Gaga, Governor-elect Mikie Sherrill	The cast of The Queen of Versailles
RFK Jr.'s Magnetic Poetry. Big Questions with Even Bigger Stars (with Daniel Craig). Lady Gaga takes "The Colbert Questionert" (new footage from October 2, 2025 episode). Governor-elect Mikie Sherrill discusses recent politics. The cast of The Queen of Versailles (Kristin Chenoweth and Stephen Schwartz) perform "This is Not the Way".
1726	December 2, 2025	Rachel Maddow	Drive-By Truckers featuring Jason Isbell
Election Night in America! Inside Entertainwood: Access Denied (special appearance by Robert De Niro). Rachel Maddow discusses recent politics and her new podcast, Rachel Maddow Presents: Burn Order. Drive-By Truckers perform "Hell No, I Ain’t Happy" from their album, The Definitive Decoration Day, featuring Jason Isbell.
1727	December 3, 2025	Michael Shannon, Jessie Buckley	N/A
Scarface 2: The Pardoning. Raccoon Noos. A special appearance by Prince Harry, Duke of Sussex. Michael Shannon discusses Nuremberg and Death by Lightning. Jessie Buckley discusses Hamnet.
1728	December 4, 2025	Jen Psaki, "Weird Al" Yankovic	N/A
The Late Show Presents: A Holiday Message from "Weird Al". Late Show Presents: Meanwhile (special appearance by Tenafly High School students). Jen Psaki discusses recent politics and The Briefing with Jen Psaki. "Weird Al" Yankovic discusses his tour, Bigger & Weirder.
1729	December 8, 2025	Sigourney Weaver, Mandy Patinkin	George Balanchine's "The Nutcracker" featuring Tiler Peck
Late Show Presents: Meanwhile. Sigourney Weaver discusses Avatar: Fire and Ash. Mandy Patinkin discusses The Artist. Tiler Peck performs "Dance of the Sugar Plum Fairy" from George Balanchine's "The Nutcracker", with musical accompaniment by Andrew Litton.
1730	December 9, 2025	Laura Dern, Andrew Ross Sorkin	N/A
The John Deere Donald Trump Model Lawn Mower. First Drafts: Holiday Cards, with Stephen's wife, Evie. Laura Dern discusses Palm Royale and Is This Thing On? Andrew Ross Sorkin discusses his new book, 1929.
1731	December 10, 2025	Taylor Swift	N/A
Taylor Swift discusses The Life of a Showgirl, Taylor Swift: The Eras Tour: The End of an Era, and Taylor Swift: The Eras Tour: The Final Show.
1732	December 11, 2025	Kate Winslet; Ben & Jerry	N/A
The Trump Platinum Card. Late Show Presents: Meanwhile. Kate Winslet discusses Goodbye June. Ben & Jerry discuss Stephen Colbert's AmeriCone Dream.
1733	December 15, 2025	Paul Rudd, Lesley Manville	N/A
Stephen acknowledges the 2025 Bondi Beach and Brown University shootings and the deaths of Rob and Michele Singer Reiner. Noo Raccoon Noos. Late Show Home Shopping: Canceled Clearance Sale! Bye Bye Buy! (with Paul Rudd). Paul Rudd discusses Anaconda. Lesley Manville discusses Oedipus.
1734	December 16, 2025	Anderson Cooper & Andy Cohen	The Mountain Goats featuring Tommy Stinson
The Hand Bag. A cameo appearance by Laura Benanti as Melania Trump. Anderson Cooper & Andy Cohen discuss their upcoming coverage of CNN's New Year's Eve Live show. The Mountain Goats perform "Cold at Night" from their new album, Through This Fire Across from Peter Balkan, featuring Tommy Stinson.
1735	December 17, 2025	Kumail Nanjiani, St. Vincent	St. Vincent
Late Show Presents: Meanwhile. Kumail Nanjiani discusses his new stand-up special, Night Thoughts. Late Show Under the Covers (St. Vincent performs "Young Americans").
1736	December 18, 2025	Hugh Jackman	Louis Cato and The Late Show Band
Stephen acknowledges the final broadcast of John Dickerson as co-anchor of the CBS Evening News. The Late Show Presents: "Colbert's Cancelled Christmas: The Last Noel" (narrated by Nick Offerman). Hugh Jackman discusses Song Sung Blue. Louis Cato and The Late Show Band perform "Have Yourself a Merry Little Christmas".
