= The Fatal Flaw =

2026 studio album by Paris Paloma

Studio album by Paris Paloma
- Released: 4 September 2026
- Length: 48:19
- Label: Nettwerk
- Producers: Justin Glasco; Carrie K; Chloe Kraemer; MyRiot; Paris Paloma; Joe Rubel

Paris Paloma chronology
Cacophony (2024)	The Fatal Flaw (2026)

Singles from The Fatal Flaw
- 1. "Good Boy" Released: September 19, 2025; 2. "Good Girl" Released: January 30, 2026; 3. "Miyazaki" Released: March 17, 2026; 4. "Stem the Flow" Released: May 6, 2026; 5. "Pre-Raphaelite" Released: July 24, 2026; 6. "I Cry in Front of Paintings" Released: August 14, 2026

The Fatal Flaw is the second studio album by the English singer-songwriter Paris Paloma. It was released on 4 September 2026 by Nettwerk. The album was preceded by the singles "Good Boy", "Good Girl", "Miyazaki", "Stem the Flow,", "Pre-Raphaelite" and "I Cry in Front of Paintings". Many of its themes are based around art and art history.

== Track listing ==
The Fatal Flaw track listing
No.	Title	Writer(s)	Producer(s)	Length
1.	"Miyazaki"	Paris Paloma; Joe Rubel	Paloma; Chloe Kraemer; Rubel	3:24
2.	"Rothko"	Paloma	Paloma; Kraemer	4:22
3.	"Stem the Flow"	Paloma	Paloma; Justin Glasco	4:03
4.	"Bleeding Part of Me"	Paloma	Paloma; Rubel	4:00
5.	"Get Her the Fucking Flowers"	Paloma	Paloma; Glasco	3:36
6.	"Pre-Raphaelite"	Paloma	Paloma; Glasco	4:22
7.	"Good Girl"	Paloma; Kraemer	Paloma; Kraemer	4:23
8.	"Pyrrhus (You Go Where I Cannot)"	Paloma	Paloma; MyRiot	5:24
9.	"Silhouette on the Hill"	Paloma	Paloma; Glasco	4:20
10.	"Good Boy"	Paloma	Paloma; Carrie K; Kraemer	3:42
11.	"Beautiful Birds"	Paloma	Paloma; Glasco; Kraemer	3:42
12.	"I Cry in Front of Paintings"	Paloma; Kraemer	Paloma; Kraemer	2:55
Total length:				48:19

== Personnel ==
Credits are adapted from Tidal.

=== Musicians ===
- Paris Paloma – vocals, background vocals (all tracks); keyboards (track 1), acoustic guitar (2, 4, 5, 9, 12), electric guitar (4)
- Chloe Kraemer – synthesizer (1, 11, 12), string section (2, 11, 12); piano, violin (2); drums (12), keyboards (12)
- Joe Rubel – bass guitar, electric guitar, keyboards (1, 4); acoustic guitar (4)
- Marshall Altman – acoustic guitar (1), bass guitar (4)
- Polly Money – acoustic guitar, electric guitar (1)
- Eleonore Denig – viola, violin (2, 3, 6); string section (3, 6, 12)
- Emerson Lee-Scott – bass guitar, drums (2)
- Justin Glasco – acoustic guitar, bass guitar, drums, electric guitar (3, 5, 6, 9, 11); string section (3, 5, 6), synthesizer (3, 6, 9, 11), keyboards (3, 6, 9), piano (5, 6, 9, 11); harpsichord, mandola (6)
- Jim Molyneux – background vocals, drums (4)
- George Cowley – background vocals (4)
- Jack Pritchard – background vocals (4)
- Matt Glasbey – synthesizer (4)
- Tim Bran – background vocals, bass guitar, electric guitar, keyboards, string section, synthesizer (8)
- Roy Kerr – background vocals, keyboards, synthesizer (8)
- Tristan Fry – timpani (12)

=== Technical ===
- Spike Stent – mixing (1, 3, 6, 7, 9, 12)
- Ryan Lipman – mixing (2, 4, 5, 8, 10, 11)
- Mike Poole – immersive mixing
- Randy Merrill – mastering
- Chloe Kraemer – engineering (2, 7, 11)
- Justin Glasco – engineering (3, 5, 6, 9, 11)
- Joe Rubel – engineering (4)
- Matt Glasbey – engineering (4)
- MyRiot – engineering (8)

== Charts ==
Chart performance for The Fatal Flaw
Chart (2026)	Peak position
Australian Albums (ARIA)	68
Belgian Albums (Ultratop Flanders)	42
Belgian Albums (Ultratop Wallonia)	160
Dutch Albums (Album Top 100)	90
German Albums (Offizielle Top 100)	91
New Zealand Albums (RMNZ)	35
Scottish Albums (Official Charts)	9
UK Albums (Official Charts)	30
UK Independent Albums (Official Charts)	5
