= Hello, Goodbye! (The Late Show with Stephen Colbert) =

- The Late Show with Stephen Colbert episode
- Episode no.: Season 11; Episode 118F
- Original air date: May 21, 2026
- Running time: 78 minutes (with commercials)

Guest appearances
- See full list of cameos featured

Episode chronology
| ← Previous; Bruce Springsteen | Next → — |
- List of The Late Show with Stephen Colbert episodes (2026)

"Hello, Goodbye!" is the series finale of American late-night comedy television series The Late Show with Stephen Colbert. It is the 1,801st episode of the series overall and is the final episode of the eleventh season. The final episode of The Late Show with Stephen Colbert originally aired in the United States on May 21, 2026, on CBS.

== Synopsis ==
Stephen Colbert introduces the episode by thanking the audience and crew, and crediting their energy for the quality of the show. The show's opening sequence then shows numerous late-night comedy hosts introducing Colbert through spliced clips.

Colbert continues with the show's usual monologue and "Meanwhile" segment (which included a bit in which the band purposely played a presumably expensive snippet of copyrighted Vince Guaraldi music, "Linus and Lucy", in hopes of costing the network money), while being interrupted by Bryan Cranston, Paul Rudd, Tim Meadows and Ryan Reynolds, who all believe themselves to be the show's final guests. Tig Notaro is also present, but only wants to view the episode as a "historical event", unaware that it is The Late Show's final episode. Colbert introduces his guest, Pope Leo XIV (voiced off-screen by Brian Stack), but Leo does not appear because staff misconstrued a request in Leo's rider. Paul McCartney then appears to be interviewed by Colbert to promote his newest album, The Boys of Dungeon Lane. McCartney gifts a photo of The Beatles on The Ed Sullivan Show, which occurred on the same stage as the show.

The show runs into technical issues after each commercial break, causing an impromptu commercial break in the middle of McCartney's interview. Colbert heads backstage to find that a wormhole is absorbing objects inside of the Ed Sullivan Theater. Neil deGrasse Tyson briefs Colbert on the wormhole, but Colbert becomes annoyed and pushes Tyson into it. Jon Stewart appears to read a statement from Paramount that the wormhole must be covered in a balanced matter. Stewart then claims that the wormhole is only metaphorical, but is quickly disproven when Andy Cohen is sucked in, and then gives him motivational words before leaving. The co-hosts of Strike Force Five appear, remarking that the wormhole will come for their own shows (and had already appeared once before) but that Colbert can still end The Late Show on his own terms, which halts the wormhole.

As Colbert comes from backstage, the wormhole reopens in the ceiling and swallows everything and everyone. In the void, Colbert sings Elvis Costello's 1993 song "Jump Up" with Costello and both of Colbert's Late Show bandleaders, Louis Cato and Jon Batiste. In the theater, they join McCartney and the Great Big Joy Machine in a rendition of "Hello, Goodbye" as the show's staff enters the stage. In the basement during the song's coda, Colbert allows McCartney to cut power to the theater; the wormhole then swallows the theater and compacts it into a snow globe playing a toy chime version of the show's theme. Colbert's dog Benny sniffs the snow globe before being beckoned to walk off with Colbert offscreen.

== Background ==
On July 17, 2025, CBS announced that it would be ending The Late Show with Stephen Colbert in May 2026, retiring the Late Show franchise altogether after 33 years (with the first 22 seasons under David Letterman and the following 11 seasons under Colbert), describing the move as "purely a financial decision". Unnamed sources at CBS claim The Late Show was losing $40 million per year with a staff of 200 and Colbert making $20 million per year. However, Colbert has pointed out that in 2023, less than two years before the decision to cancel the show, CBS offered him a five-year contract renewal; Colbert accepted a three-year extension instead. "Less than two years before they called to say it's over, they were very eager for me to be signed for a long time," Colbert told the New York Times. "So, something changed." The announcement has drawn controversy due to the show's relative popularity among late-night television viewers, its relation to the merger of Skydance and Paramount, and perceived political motive due to criticisms of the Trump administration by Colbert. The series finale aired on May 21, 2026, as an extended episode. Colbert’s competition in the 11:35pm ET time slot (NBC’s The Tonight Show Starring Jimmy Fallon and ABC’s Jimmy Kimmel Live!) had opted to not run new episodes the same night as the finale in solidarity to help give the finale as big of an audience as possible (with Kimmel urging viewers in his monologue during the episode that aired the night before to boycott CBS after the finale).

CBS announced a deal to lease the time slot to Byron Allen's Allen Media Group via a time buy agreement. Effective May 22, 2026, Comics Unleashed moves to the 11:35 p.m. time slot being vacated by The Late Show. The 12:37 a.m. slot, in turn, is being taken by another Allen Media property, the game show Funny You Should Ask.

== Cameos and guests ==
The episode featured numerous cameos by guests who had previously made guest appearances on the show. The group featured celebrities, actors, musicians, television personalities and other prominent people not in the aforementioned categories. Below they are listed in the order in which each cameo and guest first appeared during the episode. (Note: During the episode, Stephen Colbert jokingly says that Pope Leo XIV is waiting in the show's green room, but didn't approve of the "Chicago-style" hot dogs he'd been served and refused to come out. However, he was not actually there.)

- Bryan Cranston, actor
- Paul Rudd, actor
- Tim Meadows, actor
- Tig Notaro, comedian
- Ryan Reynolds, actor
- Paul McCartney, singer, musician and former member of The Beatles
- Neil deGrasse Tyson, astrophysicist; spotted backstage to explain the wormhole that had appeared during a pre-taped bit
- Jon Stewart, host of The Daily Show; appears backstage to deliver a message 'on behalf of Paramount'
- Andy Cohen, radio and television talk show host
- Colbert's co-hosts on the podcast Strike Force Five:
  - Jimmy Kimmel, host of Jimmy Kimmel Live!
  - Jimmy Fallon, host of The Tonight Show Starring Jimmy Fallon
  - John Oliver, host of Last Week Tonight with John Oliver
  - Seth Meyers, host of Late Night with Seth Meyers
- Elijah Wood, actor; appears briefly for a Lord of the Rings joke
- Elvis Costello, singer-songwriter and record producer
- Jon Batiste, musician, singer, songwriter and former bandleader on The Late Show with Stephen Colbert
- The entire Late Show staff; they flood the stage during the episode's final musical number

== Reception ==
=== Ratings ===
The episode premiered to more than 6.74 million viewers, making it the most-viewed episode of the show that aired on a weeknight and surpassing the series premiere of The Late Show with Stephen Colbert.

=== Critical response ===
Krystie Lee Yandoli of TheWrap wrote, "While Colbert's goodbye to late night was filled with jokes at the expense of the network and the current administration in his own tasteful manner, it was also a masterpiece of humor, heart, and an homage to the history of The Ed Sullivan Theater and its cultural significance." Liz Shannon Miller of Consequence wrote, "It was sincere without marinating in emotion, simultaneously silly and dignified. Colbert's time in late-night didn't end by choice, but he owned these final moments."

Conversely, Daniel D'Addario of Variety was disappointed, writing, "Colbert couldn't, ultimately, escape being Colbert as the episode wore on, and the final program sadly proved the case for his show's obsolescence." He also called the wormhole sketch "baffling" and "disastrous".

=== Media coverage ===
CBS' own national morning show, CBS Mornings, did not cover the finale of The Late Show. Puck reported that this was at the direction of CBS News president Tom Cibrowski, due to a Late Show cold open the previous week which poked fun at CBS Evening News anchor Tony Dokoupil and executive Bari Weiss, following Dokoupil being forced to host coverage of Donald Trump's state visit to China from Taiwan.

=== Accolades ===
| Award | Category | Nominee(s) | Result | Ref. |
|---|---|---|---|---|
| Primetime Creative Arts Emmy Awards | Outstanding Directing for a Variety Series | Yvonne De Mare | Won | |
| Primetime Creative Arts Emmy Awards | Outstanding Music Direction | Louis Cato | Nominated | |
| Primetime Creative Arts Emmy Awards | Outstanding Sound Mixing for a Variety Series or Special | Jim Murray, Harvey Goldberg, Greg Allen, Alan Bonomo, and Jonathan Herrera | Nominated | |
| Primetime Creative Arts Emmy Awards | Outstanding Technical Direction and Camerawork for a Series | Karen Obel Cape, Brian Cimino, Joe Debonis, John Harrison, Wade Latz, Dante Pagano, and John Hannel | Won | |

== Aftermath ==
Exactly 24 hours after the finale aired, Colbert once again hosted a special edition of Only in Monroe, a public access program in Monroe, Michigan that Colbert had previously guest hosted prior to the start of The Late Show with Stephen Colbert in July 2015, and had mentioned during his final monologue, stating that, "[with] show business being what it is these days, that's probably where you'll see me next". The program featured special appearances from Jack White (as the musical director), Byron Allen (via FaceTime), Steve Buscemi, Jeff Daniels, and Eminem (who had previously appeared during the 2015 program).

On June 16, 2026, CBS announced that it had reached a licensing agreement with Lee Mendelson Film Productions (LMFP) following the unauthorized use of "Linus and Lucy" during the finale. Written by Vince Guaraldi in 1964, the composition later became the principal musical theme of the Peanuts television specials and one of the most recognizable pieces associated with the franchise. CBS had originally broadcast most of the Peanuts television specials produced by LMFP between 1965 and 2000, including A Charlie Brown Christmas and It's the Great Pumpkin, Charlie Brown. LMFP, which oversees rights associated with the specials and their music catalog, stated that CBS would pay an undisclosed licensing fee, with the proceeds donated to World Central Kitchen, a charity supported by The Late Show during its run.

== See also ==
- Series finale of The Colbert Report
- 2010 Tonight Show conflict, a similar dispute between NBC and Conan O'Brien over The Tonight Show
