= Cacophony (disambiguation) =

Cacophony is harsh, often discordant sounds.

Cacophony may also refer to:

- Cacophony (band), a heavy metal band
- Cacophony (musician), an art pop musician
- Cacophony (Rudimentary Peni album), a 1987 album by Rudimentary Peni
- Cacophony (Paris Paloma album), a 2024 album by Paris Paloma
- Batman: Cacophony, a comic book series
- Cacophony Society, an artist/culture-jamming group
