= List of The Late Show with Stephen Colbert episodes (2026) =

- No. of episodes: 65

Release
- Original network: CBS
- Original release: January 5 – May 21, 2026

Season chronology
- ← Previous; 2025 episodes Next →

This is the list of episodes of The Late Show with Stephen Colbert that aired in 2026.

== 2026 ==
=== January ===
No.	Original release date	Guest(s)	Musical/entertainment guest(s)
1737	January 5, 2026	Ethan Hawke, Julia Ioffe	N/A
Grandparent Nickname Database. Endea Owens' Flushable Towels. Louis Cato's Speed Taco Truck. Ethan Hawke discusses Blue Moon. Julia Ioffe discusses recent politics and her new book, Motherland.
1738	January 6, 2026	Jodie Foster, Tracy Letts	N/A
Pardon City. Late Show Presents: The Sound of Science. Jodie Foster discusses A Private Life. Tracy Letts discusses Bug.
1739	January 7, 2026	Chris Hayes, Natalie Portman	Robyn
Stephen acknowledges the killing of Renée Good. Chris Hayes discusses recent politics and his new book, The Sirens' Call. Natalie Portman takes "The Colbert Questionert" (new footage from May 21, 2025 episode). Robyn performs "Sexistential" from her new album of the same name.
1740	January 8, 2026	Tom Hiddleston, Terry Gross	N/A
Gros. Late Show Presents: Meanwhile. Tom Hiddleston discusses The Night Manager. Terry Gross discusses Fresh Air.
1741	January 12, 2026	Jimmy Kimmel, Governor-elect Abigail Spanberger	N/A
Lego Trophy Set. Monkey 'Mergency. Late Show Presents: Meanwhile. Jimmy Kimmel takes "The Colbert Questionert" (new footage from September 30, 2025 episode). Governor-elect Abigail Spanberger discusses recent politics.
1742	January 13, 2026	Amanda Seyfried, Yo-Yo Ma	Yo-Yo Ma
Monkey 'Mergency Update. Community Calendar: Allentown, Pennsylvania with Amanda Seyfried. Amanda Seyfried discusses The Testament of Ann Lee. Yo-Yo Ma discusses his new podcast, Our Common Nature. Yo-Yo Ma performs a medley of the prelude from Bach's first Cello Suite and "Over the Rainbow".
1743	January 14, 2026	Paul Giamatti, Ryan Coogler	N/A
Trump-Tosterone. Paul Giamatti discusses Star Trek: Starfleet Academy. Ryan Coogler discusses Sinners.
1744	January 15, 2026	Stellan Skarsgård, Jon Meacham	N/A
Warren Haynes sits in with the band and provides musical accompaniment. Late Show Presents: Meanwhile. Stellan Skarsgård discusses Sentimental Value. Jon Meacham discusses his new book, American Struggle.
1745	January 20, 2026	Senator Bernie Sanders	Lucinda Williams featuring Brittney Spencer
CSI: Ooh La La. Senator Bernie Sanders discusses recent politics. Lucinda Williams performs "The World's Gone Wrong" from her new album, World's Gone Wrong, featuring Brittney Spencer.
1746	January 21, 2026	Jane Fonda, Jessica Williams	N/A
Late Show Presents: Meanwhile. Jane Fonda discusses the Committee for the First Amendment. Jessica Williams discusses Shrinking.
1747	January 22, 2026	Chance the Rapper, Maria J. Stephan	Chance the Rapper
Chance the Rapper discusses the 10th anniversary of Coloring Book and his new album, Star Line. Maria J. Stephan discusses recent politics. Chance the Rapper performs "The Negro Problem".
1748	January 26, 2026	Governor Josh Shapiro	The War and Treaty
Stephen acknowledges the killing of Alex Pretti. Late Show Presents: Meanwhile. Governor Josh Shapiro discusses recent politics and his new book, Where We Keep the Light. The War and Treaty performs "I'm Still Standing", featuring Willie Blount.
1749	January 27, 2026	Sam Rockwell, George Saunders	N/A
Sam Rockwell discusses his career and Good Luck, Have Fun, Don't Die. George Saunders discusses his new book, Vigil.
1750	January 28, 2026	Bad Bunny, Katherine LaNasa	N/A
Claus & Order: Santa Victims Unit. Late Show Presents: Meanwhile. Bad Bunny takes "The Colbert Questionert" (new footage from July 22, 2025 episode). Katherine LaNasa discusses The Pitt.
1751	January 29, 2026	Alexander Skarsgård, Jacob Soboroff	N/A
A musical tribute to the 25th anniversary of The Lord of the Rings: "#1 Trilly" (special appearances by Dominic Monaghan, Billy Boyd, Sean Astin, Elijah Wood, Anna Kendrick, Method Man, Killer Mike, Orlando Bloom, Andy Serkis and Hugo Weaving; segment rebroadcast from December 15, 2021 episode). Alexander Skarsgård discusses Pillion. Jacob Soboroff discusses recent politics and his new book, Firestorm.

=== February ===
No.	Original release date	Guest(s)	Musical/entertainment guest(s)
1752	February 2, 2026	John Oliver	N/A
The Trump–Epstein Files. Late Show Home Shopping: Canceled Clearance Sale! Bye Bye Buy! (with John Oliver). John Oliver discusses Last Week Tonight.
1753	February 3, 2026	Mark Ruffalo, Father James Martin	N/A
Mark Ruffalo discusses Crime 101. Father James Martin discusses his new book, Work in Progress.
1754	February 4, 2026	Ian McKellen	I'm with Her
A cameo appearance by Laura Benanti as Melania Trump. Ian McKellen discusses his career and An Ark. I'm with Her performs "The Obvious Child" from their new album, Sing Me Alive.
1755	February 5, 2026	James Taylor	James Taylor
First Drafts: Valentine's Day Cards, with Stephen's wife, Evie. James Taylor discusses his career as a singer-songwriter and performs "You Can Close Your Eyes", with his son Henry providing musical accompaniment.
1756	February 16, 2026	Jennifer Garner	N/A
Stephen addresses his controversial interview with James Talarico. Jennifer Garner discusses The Last Thing He Told Me. Stephen acknowledges the death of Robert Duvall (segment rebroadcast from June 24, 2021 episode).
1757	February 17, 2026	Kaitlan Collins, Walter Isaacson	N/A
Kaitlan Collins discusses The Source. Walter Isaacson discusses his new book, The Greatest Sentence Ever Written.
1758	February 18, 2026	Senator Jon Ossoff, Kyle MacLachlan	N/A
Thundercat sits in with the band and provides musical accompaniment. Basilica Snack Bar. Stephen acknowledges the death of Jesse Jackson. Ooh Ooh! Ah! Ah! Update! Ooh Ooh! Awww. Late Show Presents: Meanwhile. Senator Jon Ossoff discusses recent politics. Kyle MacLachlan discusses Fallout and his new podcast, What Are We Even Doing?
1759	February 19, 2026	Melissa McCarthy, Michael Pollan	N/A
Late Show Presents: The Sound of Science. Melissa McCarthy discusses the 10th anniversary of Encore: Movie Partners Sing Broadway. Michael Pollan discusses his new book, A World Appears.
1760	February 23, 2026	Ray Romano, Emma Thompson	N/A
Cory Wong sits in with the band and provides musical accompaniment. Late Show Home Shopping (special appearance by Senator Jeff Flake). Ray Romano discusses All Out: Comedy About Ambition. Emma Thompson takes "The Colbert Questionert" (new footage from October 27, 2025 episode).
1761	February 24, 2026	John Dickerson	Mitski
Special live episode following the State of the Union Address. Late Show Presents: Meanwhile. John Dickerson discusses the State of the Union Address and recent politics. Mitski performs "I'll Change for You" from her album Nothing's About to Happen to Me.
1762	February 25, 2026	Teyana Taylor, Bradley Whitford	N/A
Stephen Colbert Presents: Stephen Colbert's Segment About Youth Culture (I'm So Tired, Please Clap). Teyana Taylor discusses One Battle After Another. Bradley Whitford discusses For Worse.
1763	February 26, 2026	Kurt & Wyatt Russell	CMAT
Late Show Presents: Meanwhile. Kurt & Wyatt Russell discuss Monarch: Legacy of Monsters. CMAT performs "When a Good Man Cries" from her album Euro-Country.

=== March ===
No.	Original release date	Guest(s)	Musical/entertainment guest(s)
1764	March 2, 2026	Brett McGurk, Daniel Radcliffe, Maggie Gyllenhaal	N/A
Brandee Younger sits in with the band and provides musical accompaniment. America at Whaaa? Brett McGurk discusses the 2026 Iran war. Daniel Radcliffe discusses Every Brilliant Thing. Maggie Gyllenhaal discusses The Bride!
1765	March 3, 2026	Jake Gyllenhaal, Maria Bamford	N/A
A War with Iran. Late Show Presents: Meanwhile. Jake Gyllenhaal discusses The Bride! Maria Bamford discusses Paralyzed by Hope: The Maria Bamford Story.
1766	March 4, 2026	Steve Carell	Hozier & Lake Street Dive
Hormuz Nuz U Can Uz. Late Show Home Shopping: Canceled Clearance Sale! Bye Bye Buy! (with Steve Carell). Steve Carell discusses Rooster. Hozier and Lake Street Dive perform "With a Little Help from My Friends", with Louis Cato and the Great Big Joy Machine providing musical accompaniment.
1767	March 5, 2026	Jimmy Fallon, Harvey Guillén	N/A
Rescue Dog Rescue with Jimmy Fallon. Jimmy Fallon discusses The Tonight Show. Harvey Guillén discusses The Rocky Horror Show.
1768	March 9, 2026	John Lithgow, Paul Rieckhoff	N/A
The Celebrity Ayatollah. Late Show Energy Tips. Are Men OK? Cam-Man-Mera Cam: Man Haxx. John Lithgow discusses Giant. Paul Rieckhoff discusses recent politics and his podcast, Independent Americans.
1769	March 10, 2026	Michelle Pfeiffer, Dave Matthews	Dave Matthews
Hormuz Nuz U Can Uz: Part Tuz: Kerbluz. Shoes Noes. Late Show Presents: Meanwhile. Michelle Pfeiffer discusses The Madison. Dave Matthews discusses his career as a singer-songwriter and performs "Don't Drink the Water".
1770	March 11, 2026	Clarissa Ward, Pete Holmes	N/A
House Hunters: Doomsday Bunker. Hormuz Nuz U Can Uz: It Continuz! The Late Show with Stephen Colbert Penny Press. Clarissa Ward discusses the 2026 Iran war. Pete Holmes discusses his new comedy special, Silly Silly Fun Boy, and his new book, Spells to Cast on Your Parents.
1771	March 12, 2026	Wanda Sykes, Robert Smigel	Dan & Peggy Reeder
Hormuz Nuz U Can Uz: Shipping He Refuz: Cuz Lever Be Uz'd. 'Squatch Watch. Late Show Presents: Meanwhile. Words I Never Thought I Would Live To Say Cam. Wanda Sykes discusses Undercard. Robert Smigel discusses his podcast, Humor Me. Triumph the Insult Comic Dog places a call to Stephen. Dan & Peggy Reeder perform "Speed of the Sound of Loneliness".
1772	March 16, 2026	Trey Parker, Matt Stone & Robert Lopez; Andrew Rannells	Andrew Rannells
Lexus May to Neigh Event. Hormuz Nuz U Can Uz: Nothing Can Get Thruz: When Will It End? No Cluz! Trey Parker, Matt Stone & Robert Lopez discuss the 15th anniversary of The Book of Mormon. Andrew Rannells discusses his role in The Book of Mormon. Andrew Rannells performs "I Believe" with the Broadway company of the musical.
1773	March 17, 2026	Elijah Wood, David Alan Grier	Lea Michele and the Broadway cast & orchestra of Chess
Havinaplan. Hormuz Nuz U Can Uz: Allies Neither Amuz'd Nor Seduz'd: Are We Gonna Luz? Hormuz Nuz U Can Uz: Commander-in-Snuz. Late Show Presents: Meanwhile. Elijah Wood discusses Ready or Not 2: Here I Come. David Alan Grier discusses St. Denis Medical. Lea Michele sings "Nobody's Side" with the Broadway cast & orchestra of Chess providing musical accompaniment.
1774	March 18, 2026	Edward Norton, José Andrés	N/A
Ooh Ooh! Ah! Ah! Update! Ooh Ooh! Ah! Ah! Update! Presents: Ooh Ooh La La! Bro, No! Cam. Edward Norton discusses The Invite and performs "Crossing Brooklyn Ferry" by Walt Whitman. José Andrés steps into the kitchen with Stephen.
1775	March 30, 2026	John Mulaney, David Byrne	David Byrne
John Mulaney discusses recent politics and his stand-up tour, Mister Whatever. David Byrne discusses his new album and tour, Who Is the Sky?, and performs "When We Are Singing".
1776	March 31, 2026	Nathan Lane, Arsenio Hall	N/A
Hormuz Nuz U Can Uz: Entering Month Tuz: But Strait Still Cluzed? Me Confuzed. Late Show Presents: The Sound of Science. Nathan Lane discusses Death of a Salesman and performs "Laughing Matters" from When Pigs Fly, accompanied by Marc Shaiman. Arsenio Hall discusses his new book, Arsenio.

=== April ===
No.	Original release date	Guest(s)	Musical/entertainment guest(s)
1777	April 1, 2026	Meryl Streep	Maggie Rogers
Gregg Phillips' Teleportation Waffles. Rescue Staff Rescue. Meryl Streep discusses recent politics and The Devil Wears Prada 2. Maggie Rogers performs "One for My Baby (and One More for the Road)".
1778	April 2, 2026	Paul Simon, Ramy Youssef	Paul Simon
Kowalsky & Sons Space Plumbers. Late Show Presents: Meanwhile. Paul Simon discusses his career as a singer-songwriter and his concert tour, A Quiet Celebration. Ramy Youssef discusses his new stand-up special, In Love. Paul Simon performs "Something So Right" from his 1973 album, There Goes Rhymin' Simon.
1779	April 6, 2026	Keanu Reeves, Jack White	N/A
Rashawn Ross sits in with Louis Cato and the Great Big Joy Machine. The G**damn White House Easter Mother****in’ Egg Roll. What's Going On Over There? Keanu Reeves discusses Outcome. Jack White discusses his new book, Jack White Complete Lyrics and Selected Writing.
1780	April 7, 2026	Oprah Winfrey, Brandi Carlile	Brandi Carlile
Oprah Winfrey discusses The Oprah Podcast. Brandi Carlile discusses her concert tour, "The Human Tour" and performs "Church & State" from her new album, Returning to Myself.
1781	April 8, 2026	Bryan Cranston	Robert Plant with Saving Grace
The Prez Ain't Right. Hormuz Nuz U Can Uz: Ships Finally Get Thruz! Stoppage Renuz: Everybody Luz. Late Show Presents: Meanwhile. Bryan Cranston discusses Malcolm in the Middle: Life's Still Unfair. Robert Plant performs "Higher Rock" from his new album, Saving Grace, with his band of the same name providing musical accompaniment.
1782	April 13, 2026	Maya Rudolph; Nick Offerman & Jeff Tweedy	Hayley Williams & Jeff Tweedy
A cameo appearance by Laura Benanti as Melania Trump. Hormuz Nuz U Can Uz: Yes, It's Truz: Now We Block It Tuz! Maya Rudolph discusses Oh, Mary!. Nick Offerman and Jeff Tweedy discuss their friendship. Hayley Williams and Jeff Tweedy perform "Ffunny Ffrends".
1783	April 14, 2026	Billy Crystal, Ina Garten	N/A
Antichrist Superstar. The Get It On Cam. Billy Crystal discusses 860. Ina Garten discusses her new books, Be Ready When the Luck Happens and Simply Ina.
1784	April 15, 2026	Anne Hathaway, Josh Johnson	N/A
The Chimp Civil War (special appearance by Ken Burns and narrated by John Lithgow). The Late Show's Women's Hotline (special appearance by Rachel Dratch). Anne Hathaway discusses Mother Mary. Josh Johnson discusses The Daily Show and his new stand-up special, Symphony.
1785	April 16, 2026	Anderson Cooper, Patton Oswalt	N/A
Chopper Talk. Louis Cato's Protein Packed Motor Oil. Jon Lampley's Edible DVDs. Corey Bernhard's Horse-Shaped Pasta. Anderson Cooper discusses recent politics and Anderson Cooper 360. Patton Oswalt discusses his new stand-up special, Tea & Scotch.
1786	April 20, 2026	Don Cheadle, Jake Tapper	N/A
FBI: Most Wasted. Hormuz Nuz U Can Uz: Both Sides Accuz: Help Us, Tom Cruz. Late Show Presents: Meanwhile. Don Cheadle discusses Proof. Jake Tapper discusses recent politics and The Lead.
1787	April 21, 2026	Neil deGrasse Tyson, John Kerry	Raye
TMZ DC. John Kerry discusses recent politics. Neil deGrasse Tyson discusses his new book, Take Me to Your Leader. Raye performs "Click Clack Symphony" from her new album, This Music May Contain Hope.
1788	April 22, 2026	Pete Buttigieg, Andy Serkis	N/A
Godorade. Hormuz Nuz U Can Uz: Iran Takes Tuz: We In Deep Duduz. Late Show Home Shopping: Canceled Clearance Sale! Bye Bye Buy! (special appearance by Jon Stewart). Pete Buttigieg discusses recent politics. Andy Serkis discusses Animal Farm.
1789	April 23, 2026	Senator Elizabeth Warren, Michael Stipe	Michael Stipe
Uncle Cops (special appearance by John C. Reilly). Elizabeth Warren discuses recent politics. Michael Stipe discusses his upcoming solo album and performs "The Rest of Ever", with Louis Cato and the Great Big Joy Machine providing musical accompaniment.

=== May ===
No.	Original release date	Guest(s)	Musical/entertainment guest(s)
1790	May 4, 2026	Christopher Nolan, Dave Grohl	Foo Fighters
Good Segway! Rescue Dog Rescue: Where Arf They Now? Christopher Nolan discusses The Odyssey. Dave Grohl discusses the Foo Fighters' new album, Your Favorite Toy. The Foo Fighters perform "Caught in the Echo".
1791	May 5, 2026	President Barack Obama	N/A
Hormuz Nuz U Can Uz: Would Rather Drink Buz. President Barack Obama discusses the opening of the Barack Obama Presidential Center in Chicago. Late Show Wastepaper Basketball: Oval Office Replica Rematch.
1792	May 6, 2026	Sally Field	Chris Stapleton
First Drafts: Mother's Day Cards, with Stephen's wife, Evie. Sally Field discusses Remarkably Bright Creatures. Chris Stapleton performs "Living in the Promiseland", with Mickey Raphael providing musical accompaniment.
1793	May 7, 2026	John Krasinski	N/A
Late Show Presents: Kids Pitch – Late Night Edition. Evening Island with Rebecca (special appearances by Jenny Slate, The Avett Brothers, Liam Neeson, Taylor Dearden, Isa Briones and John Oliver, with narration by Richard Kind). John Krasinski discusses Jack Ryan: Ghost War.
1794	May 11, 2026	Strike Force Five	N/A
Original members Ibanda Ruhumbika, Eddie Barbash, and Maddie Rice sit in with the band and provide musical accompaniment. The hosts of Strike Force Five (Jimmy Fallon, Jimmy Kimmel, Seth Meyers and John Oliver) reminisce the podcast and announce a new "emergency" episode.
1795	May 12, 2026	Julia Louis-Dreyfus, Pedro Pascal	N/A
The Donald Trump Desktop End-of-the-Iran-War-a-Day Calendar. Chopper Talk. Big Questions with Even Bigger Stars (with Julia Louis-Dreyfus). Julia Louis-Dreyfus discusses The Sheep Detectives. Pedro Pascal discusses The Mandalorian and Grogu.
1796	May 13, 2026	President Barack Obama, Tom Hanks	Annaleigh Ashford, Christopher Jackson, Bernadette Peters, Ben Platt & Patrick Wilson
Rush Hour 4. Hormuz Nuz U Can Uz: A Trillion Misuz'd: Stockpiles Barely Reduz'd: I Am the Walrus, Ku-Ku-Kachuz. President Barack Obama takes "The Colbert Questionert" (new footage from May 5 episode). Tom Hanks discusses World War II. Annaleigh Ashford, Christopher Jackson, Bernadette Peters, Ben Platt and Patrick Wilson perform "Putting It Together" from Sunday in the Park with George.
1797	May 14, 2026	David Letterman	The Strokes
David Letterman discusses the legacy of The Late Show and throws objects from the Ed Sullivan Theater roof with Stephen. The Strokes perform "Falling Out of Love" from their new album, Reality Awaits.
1798	May 18, 2026	none	none
"The Worst of The Late Show with Stephen Colbert," featuring a staff-only audience and content that never aired due to time or quality. A special appearance by Michael Keaton. Graphics Graveyard, with graphics department head Andro Buneta. Stephen gives a tour of his old neighborhood in Chicago, with Paul Dinello (new footage from August 19, 2024 episode). An appearance by "Shriekin' Joe" (Brian Stack) with his daughter "Shriekin' Jane". Stephen and Late Show writer Michael Cruz Kayne perform the parody song "It's Raining Fish", featuring a special appearance by Paul Shaffer. The director's cut of Fernando Livschitz’s original Late Show opening sequence is presented behind the closing credits.
1799	May 19, 2026	Jon Stewart, Steven Spielberg	David Byrne
Jon Stewart discusses The Daily Show. Andra Day makes a special appearance during Jon Stewart's interview. Steven Spielberg discusses Disclosure Day. David Byrne performs "Burning Down the House", featuring Stephen Colbert.
1800	May 20, 2026	none	Bruce Springsteen
The Doot Doot Vinci Code. A special appearance by Chef José Andrés. Stephen takes "The Colbert Questionert" (special appearances by Billy Crystal, "Weird Al" Yankovic, Josh Brolin, Martha Stewart, Mark Hamill, Jim Gaffigan, Jeff Daniels, Tiffany Haddish, Evelyn McGee Colbert, Amy Sedaris, Ben Stiller, Aubrey Plaza, James Taylor, Robert De Niro, and John Dickerson). Bruce Springsteen performs "Streets of Minneapolis".
1801	May 21, 2026	Paul McCartney	Paul McCartney, Elvis Costello, Jon Batiste, Louis Cato & Stephen Colbert
The Late Show's series finale: Stephen acknowledges the "joy" the show has been before a cold-open montage of late-night hosts past and present (including Ed Sullivan) insult Stephen. Bryan Cranston, Paul Rudd, and Tim Meadows make a cameo appearance during the monologue. Late Show Presents: Meanwhile (special appearances by Tig Notaro and Ryan Reynolds). Paul McCartney recalls performing with The Beatles on The Ed Sullivan Show and discusses The Boys of Dungeon Lane. Neil deGrasse Tyson, Jon Stewart, Andy Cohen, Elijah Wood, and the Strike Force Five team (Jimmy Fallon, Jimmy Kimmel, Seth Meyers, and John Oliver) help Stephen deal with the "wormhole" about to envelop the show. On the "other side," Stephen joins Elvis Costello, Louis Cato, and former bandleader Jon Batiste in performing "Jump Up" The four men and the Great Big Joy Machine then join Paul McCartney in a live performance of "Hello, Goodbye", ending with Stephen's family and the show's staff taking the stage. Stephen lets Paul McCartney (in a pre-filmed final scene) turn off the Ed Sullivan Theater's power, allowing the "wormhole" to turn the building into a snow globe that plays a music box rendition of the Late Show theme song.
