= Paris Paloma =

British singer-songwriter (born 1999)

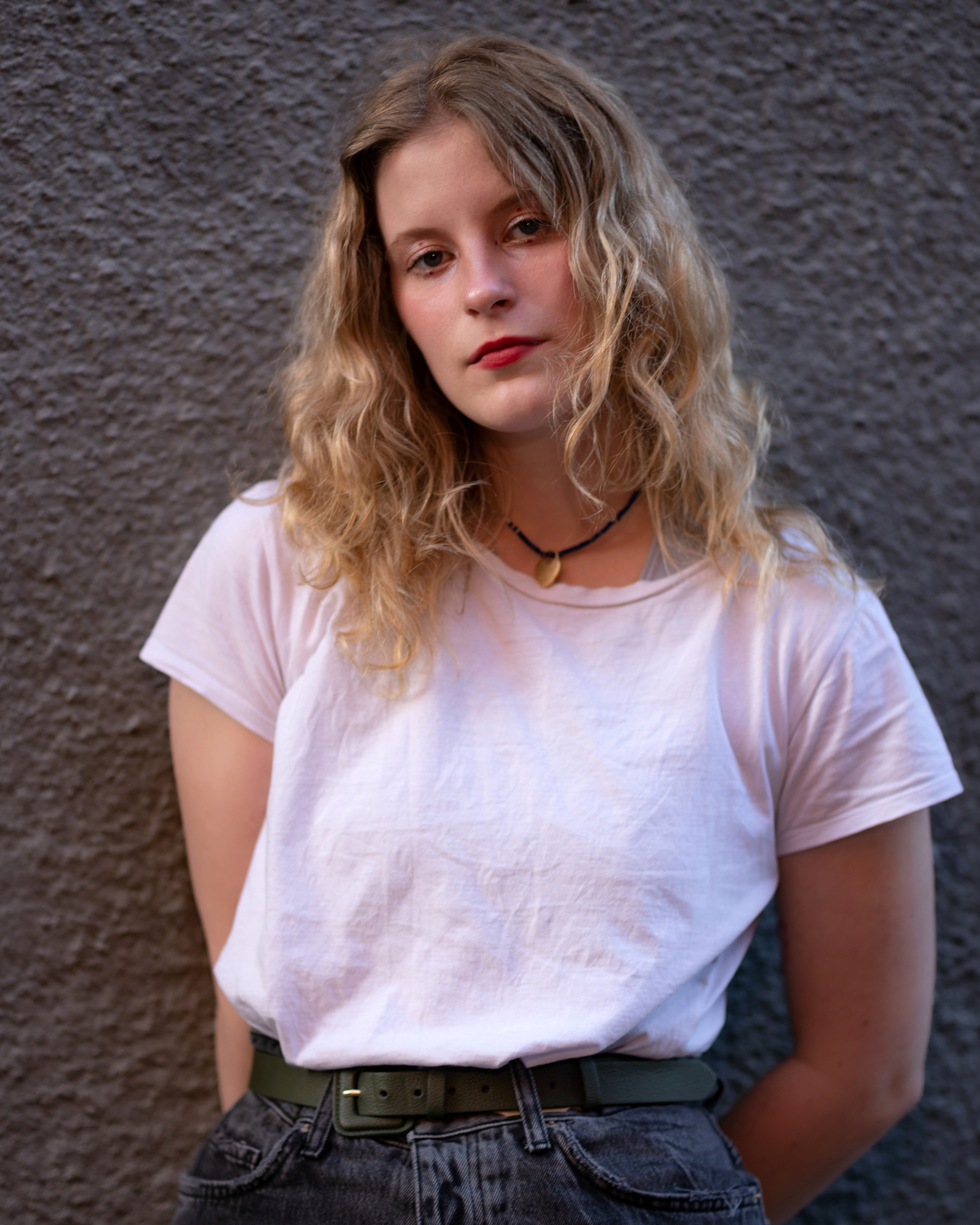
- Paloma in 2023

Background information
- Born: 17 November 1999 (age 26); Derbyshire, England
- Genres: Indie folk; folk pop; dark pop
- Instruments: Vocals; guitar
- Years active: 2019–present
- Label: Nettwerk
- Website: Official website

Paris Paloma (born 17 November 1999) is a British singer-songwriter and guitarist. She gained prominence through the single "Labour" (2023). Her debut album, Cacophony, was released in 2024. Her second album, The Fatal Flaw, followed in 2026.

== Early life ==
Paloma was born on 17 November 1999. She grew up in Ashbourne, in the English county of Derbyshire, and attended Cheltenham Ladies’ College. She studied Fine Art and History of Art at Goldsmiths, University of London, graduating with a Bachelor of Fine Arts (BFA) in 2022.

== Career ==
=== 2019–2023: Cemeteries and Socials and early singles ===
Paloma met producer Harry Charlton in March 2020, with whom she made her debut single "Narcissus" before following it up with "Ocean Baby", "cradle", and "Underneath". During the COVID-19 lockdown, Paloma joined the Hybrid Tribe programme and was discovered by David Fernandez of High Plateau Productions. She released her debut EP cemeteries and socials in 2021. She continued putting out singles, including "The Fruits" and "It's Called: Freefall". Her cover of "Tell It to my Heart" was promoted by Hozier on social media. Paloma subsequently signed with Nettwerk in 2022, through which she released her first singles under the label "Forsaken" in December 2022 and "Notre Dame" in February 2023.

=== 2023–2025: "Labour" breakthrough and Cacophony ===
In March 2023, Paloma released the single "Labour", described as a feminist anthem about the unpaid domestic labour women have been made to do throughout history. The song became Paloma's breakthrough single; it receiving 1 million streams on Spotify within 24 hours of release and 1 million views on YouTube. A viral TikTok trend started in which various women around the world related the song to their own experiences with sexism. "Labour" became Paloma's first charting single in the UK and on Billboard in the US.

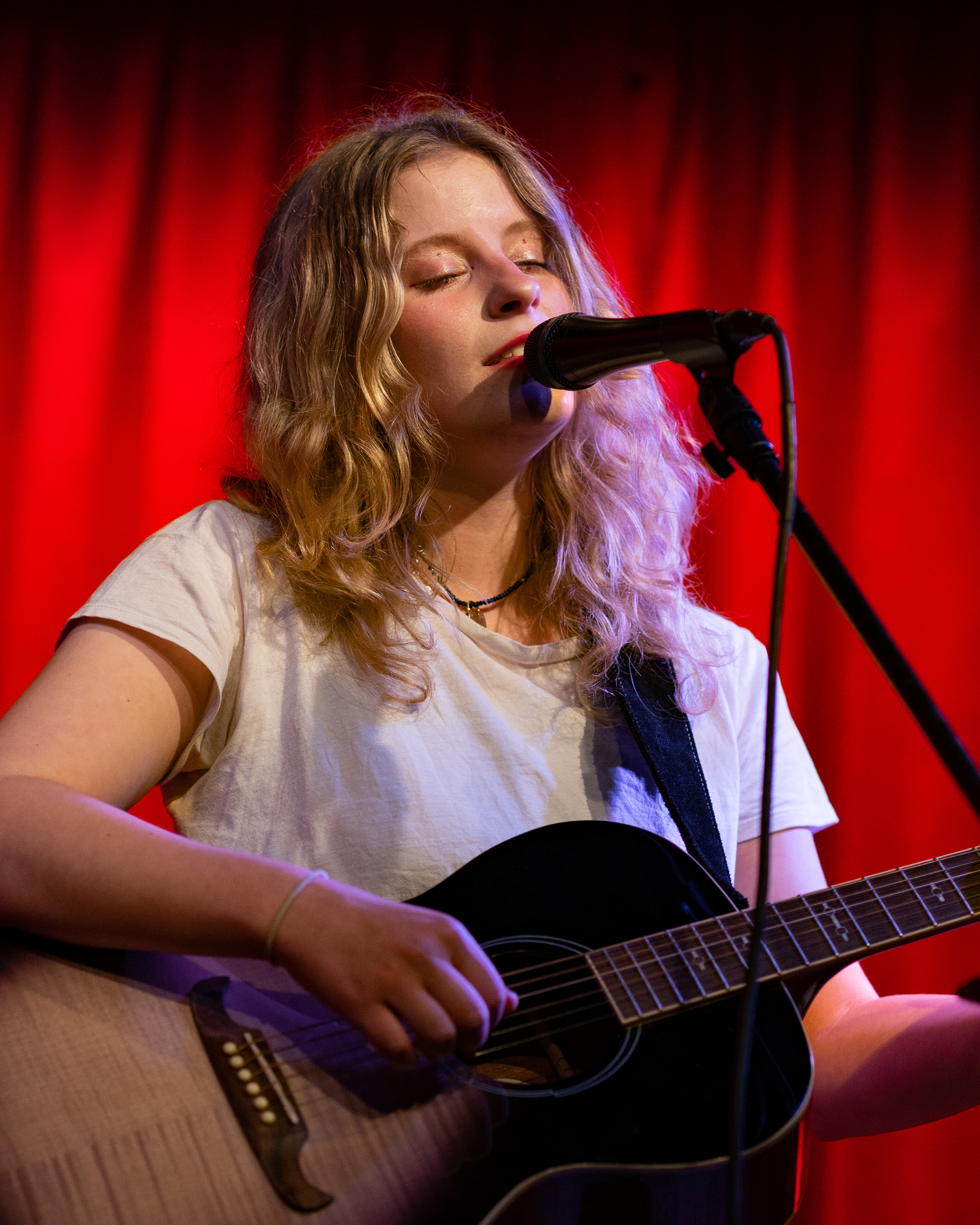
Paloma performing in 2022.

"Labour" was followed by further singles "Yeti" featuring Old Sea Brigade in July, "As Good a Reason" in September, and "Drywall" in October. She performed at the 2023 Bonnaroo, Summerfest, TRNSMT, All Points East, and Live at Leeds.

At the start of 2024, Paloma released the single "My Mind (Now)". In February 2024, Paloma supported Maisie Peters on the Europe leg of Peters' The Good Witch Tour. This was followed by a five-date UK headline tour in May and then U.S. dates. Paloma made her debut at the 2024 Glastonbury Music Festival on the BBC Introducing stage. She was named a Future Artist by BBC Radio 1. Paloma also appeared at the Best Kept Secret, BST Hyde Park where she supported Stevie Nicks, Splendour in the Grass, and Reading and Leeds.

At the end of August 2024 via Nettwerk, Paloma released her debut album Cacophony. Ahead of its release, she shared the track "The Warmth." In September, she embarked on a headline tour in Europe, supported by Sarah Julia. For The Lord of the Rings: The War of the Rohirrim (2024) soundtrack, Paloma performed an original song titled "The Rider," composed by David Long. She took her tour to North America with 15 dates in 2025.

=== 2025–present: The Fatal Flaw ===
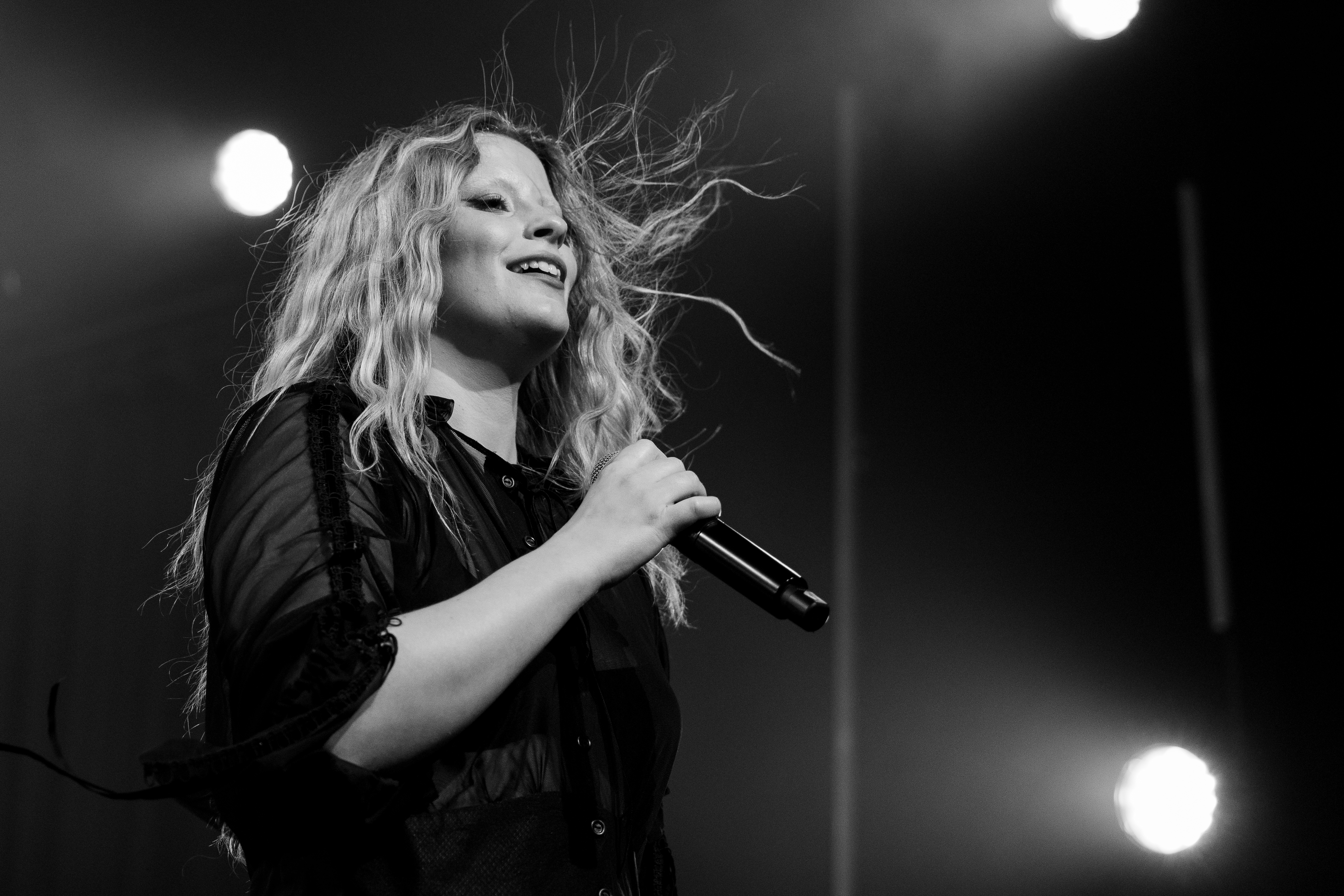
Paloma at the Montreux Jazz Festival in 2026.

In August 2025, Paloma released the single "Good Boy", featuring an introduction verse by Emma Thompson, which was later revealed to be the lead single on her sophomore album, The Fatal Flaw, which released on 4 September 2026. "Good Boy" was followed by a string of singles from The Fatal Flaw, including "Good Girl" in January 2026, her anti-AI anthem "Miyazaki" in March 2026, "Stem the Flow" in May 2026, "Pre-Raphealite" in July 2026, and "I Cry in Front of Paintings" in August 2026.

Two days after the release of "Stem the Flow," Paloma announced the album and the supporting international tour, which launched on 20 September 2026 in Phoenix, Arizona and is set to conclude in Oslo, Norway on 13 December 2026 after 39 stops. Her headlining tour follows her role as a supporting act on the European leg Florence + the Machine's Everybody Scream Tour in February 2026.

== Artistry ==
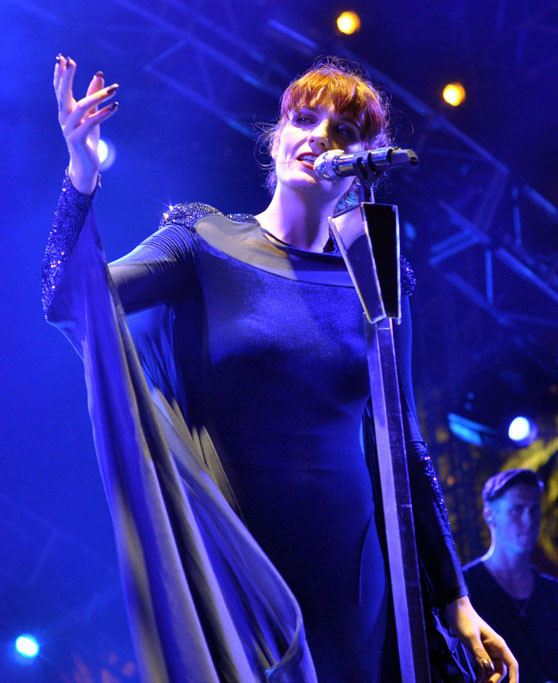
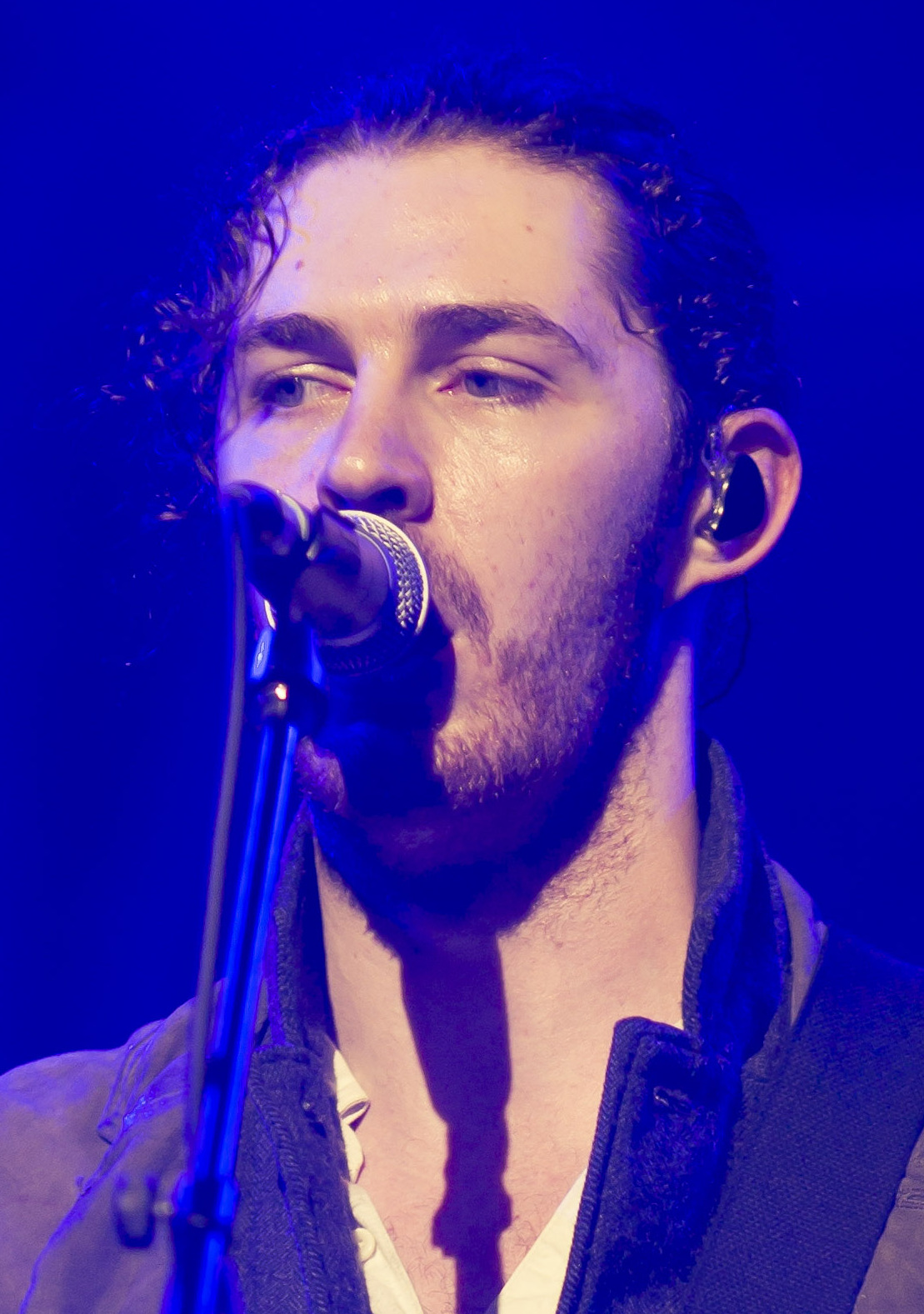
Paloma has cited Florence and the Machine and Hozier as influences.

During her childhood, Paloma's mother played soul and jazz at home. Paloma developed an admiration for lyricists who tell stories and use wordplay in both simple and complex ways, such as Ed Sheeran. Sheeran's debut album + (2011) inspired Paloma to learn guitar. This translated into a further love for the storytelling of Florence + the Machine and Hozier, who "massively" influenced her. She cited Grimes for her "worldbuilding" and Aurora as further influences, and also mentioned enjoying The Mountain Goats and Harry Nilsson.

Paloma often looks towards literature and mythology in her songwriting, as well as fine art. Her debut single "Narcissus" was directly inspired by artwork of the titular Greek myth, and her second single "Ocean Baby" evoked the characteristics of Pre-Raphaelite paintings. Her 2021 single "the last beautiful thing i saw is the thing that blinded me" alludes to Daphne du Maurier's Rebecca, while Madeline Miller's Circe (2017) shaped parts of her 2023 single "Labour". Her debut album, Cacophony, drew from Stephen Fry's Mythos (2017); she also read Mona Chollet's In Defense of Witches (2022).

== Discography ==
=== Albums ===
List of albums, with selected chart positions
Title	Album details	Peak chart positions					
Title	Album details	UK	AUS	BEL (FL)	GER	NLD	NZ
Cacophony	Released: 30 August 2024; Label: Nettwerk	— (Note: Cacophony did not enter the UK Albums Chart, but peaked at number 17 on the UK Album Downloads Chart.)	—	—	—	—	
The Fatal Flaw	Released: 4 September 2026; Label: Nettwerk	30	68	42	91	90	35

=== EPs ===
List of EPs, with selected details
Title	Details
Cemeteries and Socials	Released: 9 September 2021; Label: Self-released
Audiotree Live	Released: 22 October 2024; Label: Audiotree

=== Charting singles ===
List of singles, with selected chart positions
Title	Year	Chart positions								Certification	Album
Title	Year	UK	AUT	CAN	IRE	SWE	SWI	US Bub.	WW	Certification	Album
"Labour"	2023	22	61	71	24	82	52	4	163	BPI: Platinum; MC: Platinum; RIAA: Platinum	Cacophony

=== Other charted songs ===
List of other charted songs, with selected chart positions
Title	Year	Chart positions	Album
Title	Year	NZ Hot	Album
"Silhouette on the Hill"	2026	21	The Fatal Flaw

=== Music videos ===
Year	Title	Director
2020	"Ocean Baby"	Matt Butler
2021	"Underneath"	Matt Butler
2021	"Mulled Wine"	Soli Chaban
2022	"The Fruits"	Adam Othman
2023	"Labour"	Adam Othman
2023	"Yeti" (featuring Old Sea Brigade)	Polocho
2023	"As Good a Reason"	Harris Alvi
2023	"Drywall"	Matthew Grass
2024	"My Mind (Now)"	Matthew Grass
2024	"Boys, Bugs and Men"	Matt Butler
2024	"The Warmth"	Yoni Ben-Haim and Beau Pritchard-James
2024	"Last Woman on Earth"	Ling Yu
2025	"Good Boy"	Georgie Cowan-Turner
2026	"Good Girl"	Georgie Cowan-Turner
2026	"Miyazaki"	Georgie Cowan-Turner
2026	"Stem the Flow"	Katya Ganfeld
2026	"Pre-Raphaelite"	Rianne White
2026	"I Cry in Front of Paintings"	Phoebe Fox
2026	"Silhouette on the Hill"	Georgie Cowan-Turner
