= Strike Force Five =

2023 limited series comedy podcast

- Genre: Comedy
- Language: English

Cast and voices
- Hosted by: Stephen Colbert; Jimmy Fallon; Jimmy Kimmel; Seth Meyers; John Oliver

Production
- Length: 47–72 minutes

Publication
- No. of episodes: 13
- Original release: August 30 – October 10, 2023 May 13, 2026
- Provider: Megaphone

Related
- Website: strikeforcefive.com

Strike Force Five is a limited series podcast hosted by American comedians and talk show hosts Stephen Colbert, Jimmy Fallon, Jimmy Kimmel, Seth Meyers, and John Oliver. Each episode features conversations between the comedians on different subjects defined by an alternating leading host. Running 12 episodes from August 30 to October 10, 2023, it was created to support the five hosts' employees who were all temporarily out of work due to the 2023 Writers Guild of America strike, and its improvised nature aimed to demonstrate their importance to their shows.

Upon its debut, Strike Force Five hit the top charts on Spotify and Apple in the United States. The podcast received positive to mixed reviews, with many critics praising the motives but also commenting on the lack of coherence in discussions and the uneven quality of the recording.

== History ==
=== Background ===
On May 2, 2023, the Writers Guild of America (WGA), representing 11,500 screenwriters, went on strike over a labor dispute with the Alliance of Motion Picture and Television Producers (AMPTP). Productions for many shows employing WGA members were immediately halted, including the hosts' respective talk shows, The Late Show with Stephen Colbert, The Tonight Show Starring Jimmy Fallon, Jimmy Kimmel Live!, Late Night with Seth Meyers, and Last Week Tonight with John Oliver. Stephen Colbert suggested that the hosts keep in touch more during the strike, citing poor communication among the late-night hosts during the last writers' strike in 2008 as one of the reasons. The hosts began having weekly Zoom meetings to discuss the strike, which eventually led to Kimmel creating the podcast named after their personal text chain. The podcast was distributed by Megaphone, with alcoholic beverages company Diageo and network operator Mint Mobile serving as sponsors. The proceeds went to support the hosts' employees, who were out of work because of the strike.

=== Post-debut ===
On September 13, it was announced that Fallon, Kimmel, and Colbert would be performing together in a live show called "Strike Force Three" at the Dolby Live theater in Las Vegas on September 23. Much like Strike Force Five, the show was set to raise money for their staff members. However, the live show was canceled because Kimmel tested positive for COVID-19.

On September 7, Rolling Stone published a report on the alleged toxic work environment on The Tonight Show caused by Fallon's "erratic behavior". The nature of the report deeply contradicted the podcast's primary goal, so several critics called for the podcast to address the issue, even if the episodes had already been recorded. It was later revealed that at least two upcoming episodes were pre-recorded before the publication of the report. The controversy remained unaddressed throughout the podcast.

Several celebrities made guest appearances on the podcast, including Jon Stewart, David Letterman, and Ryan Reynolds. Conan O'Brien was set to be one of the guests, but the strike ended before he could be scheduled. Additionally, Jon Hamm made a cameo appearance as the podcast's announcer. As the writers' strike ended on September 27, allowing the production of shows to resume, the hosts announced that the podcast would conclude at an unspecified date. Four more episodes were released before it ended on October 10.

The five hosts appeared on The Late Show with Stephen Colbert on May 11, 2026, in honor of the program's upcoming finale. A special video episode of the podcast was released on May 13, and the hosts had a cameo appearance in Colbert's finale on May 21.

== Format ==
The podcast ran for 12 episodes, with each episode lasting approximately 60 minutes. During each episode, the five hosts would discuss one or more subjects, such as fishing, interesting facts about their parents or their late-night shows, on a Zoom call. The leading host, who is different for every episode, would usually decide on the subjects. A thunder sound effect played every time the podcast title is mentioned for the first three episodes, until it was removed per Meyers' request. Pre-production for each episode was highly limited, and no supervision was provided during the recording, so the discussions were mostly improvised; these measures were intended to highlight the importance of staff members, such as researchers and writers, to the hosts' late-night shows.

Jimmy Fallon hosted a game show called "Strike Force Wives!", similar to The Newlywed Game, in the fifth episode of Strike Force Five. The game show included Fallon asking the other hosts questions about their wives, but due to Fallon's inept preparation, it did not go as planned. Meyers commented that the hosts incorporated a more casual approach in later episodes after discovering that the audience enjoyed it. A second part of the game show, "The Return of Strike Force Wives!", aired on October 6.

== Episodes ==
| No. | Title | Leading host | Length | Original release date |
|---|---|---|---|---|
| 1 | "Five Late Night Hosts Talk at the Same Time for the First Time" | Jimmy Kimmel | 1:06:31 | August 30, 2023 |
| 2 | "A Second Episode About First Episodes" | Seth Meyers | 1:03:31 | September 3, 2023 |
| 3 | "Stories We Missed, Vasectomies and Moby Dick" | Stephen Colbert | 59:29 | September 7, 2023 |
| 4 | "Awards Show Screwups, Late Night Multiverse & Batman Wants to Murder Kimmel" | John Oliver | 51:07 | September 12, 2023 |
| 5 | "Strike Force Wives!" | Jimmy Fallon | 1:01:39 | September 15, 2023 |
| 6 | "The Guys Answer Questions from Listeners" | Jimmy Kimmel | 51:42 | September 19, 2023 |
| 7 | "Jon Stewart Makes it Six" | Stephen Colbert | 57:44 | September 22, 2023 |
| 8 | "The Talk Show Hosts Name Sneaky Great Talk Show Guests" | Seth Meyers | 57:11 | September 26, 2023 |
| 9 | "David Letterman Makes it Six" | Jimmy Kimmel | 1:12:49 | September 29, 2023 |
| 10 | "The Strike is Over But the Podcast Isn't Yet" | John Oliver | 42:09 | October 3, 2023 |
| 11 | "The Return of Strike Force Wives!" | Jimmy Fallon | 1:06:40 | October 6, 2023 |
| 12 | "The Strike Force Five Says Goodbye (with a Special Guest)" | Seth Meyers and Stephen Colbert | 55:51 | October 10, 2023 |
Video reunion
| 13 | "Strike Force Five Returns to Celebrate Stephen Colbert" | Jimmy Kimmel | 47:31 | May 13, 2026 |

== Reception ==
Strike Force Five received generally favorable reviews from critics. Alexi Duggins of The Guardian found the conversations interesting, with Sarah Larson of The New Yorker writing that it was refreshing to hear the hosts having friendly discussions while also supporting the strike. However, the unscripted nature of the podcast received criticism since it sometimes led to unfocused discussions and forced the hosts to interrupt each other, which was characterised by Brianna Wellen of Primetimer as "an unofficial battle to be the top late night star". Sean Malin of Vulture noted that the format and quality of the episodes largely depended on personality of the leading host. Some critics considered that the comedic potential of the podcast remained unfulfilled as a result of format implications. The sound quality limitations of Zoom also drew occasional criticism.

The fifth episode, "Strike Force Wives!", was singled out as the best episode of the podcast. Hillary Busis of Vanity Fair commented that it was "charmingly unpolished, apparently organic chaos". Sean Malin, remarking on Oliver's bickering with Fallon, wrote, "That sequence — the funniest of any episode yet, as well as the meanest — is emblematic of the larger dynamic at play between these five sharply defined male archetypes, the heartfelt camaraderie and fratty sarcasm shifting from moment to moment."

The podcast also saw responses from late-night staff members, subject-matter journalists, and other late-night hosts. Bill Carter, journalist and author of The Late Shift and The War for Late Night, praised the idea and said that the hosts "get along pretty well, which is kind of atypical for the history of late night." Sarah Kobos, photo research coordinator for The Tonight Show Starring Jimmy Fallon, expressed her gratitude for the podcast going towards helping fellow staff members. Greg Gutfeld, who hosts Gutfeld!, a late-night show unaffected by labor disputes on Fox News, called the podcast "pathetic" and additionally criticized the comedy styles of the hosts' shows.

Strike Force Five debuted at number one on the podcast and news podcast charts of both Apple and Spotify in the United States. The podcast was featured on Time and HuffPost's list of the top 10 podcasts of 2023.
