= Labour (song) =

Single by Paris Paloma

from the album Cacophony
- Released: 24 March 2023
- Genre: Indie folk; alternative folk
- Length: 3:57
- Label: Nettwerk
- Songwriter: Paris Paloma
- Producer: Justin Glasco

Paris Paloma singles chronology
"Notre Dame" (2023)	"Labour" (2023)	"Yeti" (2023)

Music video
- "Labour on YouTube

"Labour" is a song by British singer-songwriter Paris Paloma released on 24 March 2023. It is the lead single from her debut studio album, Cacophony (2024). The track is described as an anthem that addresses issues of gender inequality within societal structures.

== Background and release ==
The song was written by Paris Paloma, a British artist from Derbyshire. Paloma decided to combine two separate songs she had been writing into a single track, which became "Labour". The song, which was produced by Justin Glasco, was recorded in Los Angeles by Paloma with backup singers Natalie Duque, Nolyn Ducich and Annabel Lee.

The song was released on 24 March 2023. An official music video was released on 27 March. It is featured on Paloma's debut album, Cacophony, which was released on 30 August 2024.

== Composition ==
"Labour" is an indie folk and alternative folk ballad featuring an acoustic arrangement of bass and guitar over a chorus of background singers.

== Music video ==
The video is set in medieval times, with Paloma and Henry Hayward wearing historic garments. Paloma brings out dishes to complete a candlelit feast. Henry, sitting at the head of the table, fills his plate and gobbles up meat and fruit while she watches. He fingers his ring and she does the same, then he pushes his plate away and taps his knife against a tankard. She starts to get up with her plate and cup, then sits back down, breaks a pomegranate open and it sprays all over her dress; she stuffs berry pie into her mouth with her bare hands and makes a mess. He lowers his head and when he lifts it, she is gone and her candle is out.

A different version of the song, "Labour: The Cacophony" was released on 29 March 2024. It is a collection of clips of women singing along with the song or making thematically relevant works using it as an audio, with their vocals used as the titular cacophony.

== Critical reception ==
Critics described the song as a feminist anthem, and linked the song to the phenomenon of "female rage" in response to unbalanced domestic and emotional labour in heterosexual relationships.

== Commercial performance ==
Prior to its release, snippets from the song went viral on TikTok. The song received 1 million streams on Spotify within 24 hours of release, and 1 million views on YouTube. After the single's release, it started a viral trend in which women posted TikTok videos with the song where they described their own personal experiences with sexism. During the 2024 Romanian presidential election, the song was used by protesters against candidate Călin Georgescu, who is strongly opposed to the right to abortion.

"Labour" has over 344 million streams on Spotify as of October 2025, and its music video has over 86 million views on YouTube.

== Track listings ==
Digital download/ streaming

1. "Labour" - 3:57

Digital download/ streaming

1. "Labour" (clean) - 3:57

Digital download/ streaming

1. "Labour" (Rak Session) - 4:08
2. "Labour" (Extended Cut, Rak Session) - 4:54
3. "Labour" (Choir Intro) - 0:46

Digital download/ streaming

1. "Labour" (the cacophony) - 4:07
2. "Labour" - 3:57
3. "Labour" (Bedroom demo) - 4:07

== Charts ==
Chart performance for "Labour"
Chart (2023–2025)	Peak position
Austria (Ö3 Austria Top 40)	61
Canada (Canadian Hot 100)	71
Global 200 (Billboard)	163
Ireland (IRMA)	24
Sweden (Sverigetopplistan)	82
Switzerland (Schweizer Hitparade)	52
UK Singles (Official Charts)	22
UK Indie (Official Charts)	3
US Bubbling Under Hot 100 (Billboard)	4
US Digital Song Sales (Billboard)	13
US Hot Alternative Songs (Billboard)	9

Chart performance for "Labour (The Cacophony)"
Chart (2024)	Peak position
New Zealand Hot Singles (RMNZ)	36

== Certifications ==
Certifications for "Labour"
Region	Certification	Certified units/sales
Canada (Music Canada)	Platinum	80,000^{‡}
New Zealand (RMNZ)	Platinum	30,000^{‡}
New Zealand (RMNZ) Labour: The Cacophony	Gold	15,000^{‡}
United Kingdom (BPI)	Platinum	600,000^{‡}
United States (RIAA)	Platinum	1,000,000^{‡}
^{‡} Sales+streaming figures based on certification alone.
