= Cacophony (Paris Paloma album) =

Studio album by Paris Paloma
- Released: 30 August 2024
- Genres: Dark pop; folk; indie
- Length: 53:36
- Label: Nettwerk
- Producers: Paris Paloma; Justin Glasco

Paris Paloma chronology
Cemeteries and Socials (2021)	Cacophony (2024)	Paris Paloma on Audiotree Live (2024)

Singles from Cacophony
- 1. "Labour" Released: March 23, 2023; 2. "Yeti" Released: June 30, 2023; 3. "As Good a Reason" Released: September 1, 2023; 4. "Drywall" Released: October 13, 2023; 5. "My Mind (Now)" Released: January 24, 2024; 6. "Boys, Bugs and Men" Released: May 10, 2024; 7. "The Warmth" Released: July 20, 2024; 8. "Hunter" Released: January 17, 2025

Cacophony is the debut studio album by English singer-songwriter and guitarist Paris Paloma. The album was produced by Paloma and Justin Glasco. It was released on 30 August 2024 through Nettwerk Music Group. Incorporating elements of dark pop, folk, and indie, the album addresses themes such as feminine identity, emotional struggle, and societal expectations. Inspired in part by Greek mythology and structured loosely around the hero's journey, the 15-track release features layered vocals and varied instrumentation.

The album was preceded by seven singles, including the commercially successful "Labour", and was promoted through live performances, a European tour, and fan events. Cacophony received generally positive reviews from critics, who highlighted its thematic coherence, songwriting, and production.

== Background and recording ==
Cacophony is the debut album by Paris Paloma, released on 30 August 2024 by Nettwerk Music Group. The album delves into themes of feminine rage, societal expectations of women, and deeply embedded misogyny, reflecting Paloma's personal experiences and observations. In the recording process, Paloma collaborated with producer Justin Glasco to craft an album that prioritizes depth in writing and production over viral success. The album features rich vocal layering and ambitious instrumentation, evident in tracks like "My Mind (Now)" and more subdued songs like "Pleaser" and "Bones on the Beach". Paloma described the album as a way of making sense of "the overwhelming space of my mind where my anxiety, my OCD, and trauma processing lives", adding that expressing "feral, feminine" vulnerability felt like "a return to something primal".

== Composition ==
The album's title, Cacophony, symbolizes the chaotic and overwhelming space of Paloma's mind, where her anxiety, OCD, and trauma processing reside. The work draws inspiration from Stephen Fry's book of Greek myth retellings, Mythos, and is loosely structured around the hero's journey, mirroring Paloma's own transition from writing to musical performance. Incorporating elements of dark pop, folk, and indie, the album blends emotional intensity with themes that are both powerful and feminine. The 15-track release guides listeners through a range of moods, from tender and melancholic to forceful and defiant.

== Release and promotion ==
To promote the album, Paloma organized a "dayofcacophony" on release day, encouraging fans to participate in various activities and events worldwide. One such event took place at London's Morocco Bound Bookshop in Bermondsey, where Paloma joined fans in-store between 10–11 am. The album was made available in multiple formats, including a Bandcamp exclusive digital version that offered an acoustic track of Last Woman on Earth and a digital art booklet. Physical editions, such as a 2xLP exclusive violet vinyl, were also released. In support of Cacophony, Paloma embarked on a headline tour across Europe in September 2024, with Sarah Julia as the supporting act. She also performed at various music festivals, including Glastonbury, Best Kept Secret, and BST Hyde Park, where she supported Stevie Nicks. Cacophony is available for purchase through various retailers, including Amazon.

=== Singles ===
Paloma released seven singles ahead of the album. The lead single, "Labour", released on March 23, 2023, became a viral breakout hit and was later certified gold. She performed the song on The Late Show with Stephen Colbert in March 2024, joined by The Resistance Revival Chorus and a set inspired by The Dinner Party feminist art installation.

Subsequent singles included "Yeti", "As Good a Reason", "Drywall", "My Mind (Now)", and "Boys, Bugs and Men", released between June 2023 and May 2024. The final single, "The Warmth", was issued on July 20, 2024, serving as the last preview of the album. The song features a pagan-influenced visual and followed Paloma's high-profile performances at Glastonbury, BST Hyde Park, and Later... with Jools Holland.

== Critical reception ==
Cacophony ratings
Review scores
Source	Rating
DIY	4.5/5 stars
Dork	4/5 stars
Pitchfork	6.8/10
XS Noize	4.5/5 stars

Cacophony received positive reviews, with critics praising Paloma's songwriting and thematic boldness. A Book Of praised the album as "a powerful testament to her ability as a songwriter and artist," highlighting Paloma's distinctive voice and thematic boldness. Another review from Her Campus described Cacophony as "an underrated testament to women," noting that Paloma's emotion conveyed through her songs "never fails to give me chills." Harriet MacDonald of The Indiependent called the album a demonstration of "unimaginable skill." Pitchfork described Cacophony as expanding on feminist themes "through lush alt-pop and endless vocal layering", noting that its surprising depth in writing and production allows it to often achieve its ambitious goals. DIY called the album "an affecting record" that positions Paloma as "a powerful voice" bridging myth and the modern day with stories that demand to be heard.

== Track listing ==
All tracks are written by Paris Paloma.

Cacophony – Standard edition
No.	Title	Length
1.	"My Mind (Now)"	2:57
2.	"Pleaser"	4:49
3.	"His Land"	4:08
4.	"Drywall"	3:43
5.	"Labour"	3:58
6.	"Boys, Bugs and Men"	3:07
7.	"Knitting Song"	3:28
8.	"As Good a Reason"	2:50
9.	"Triassic Love Song"	4:01
10.	"Escape Pod"	3:23
11.	"Last Woman on Earth"	4:20
12.	"Bones on the Beach"	3:28
13.	"Hunter"	3:20
14.	"The Warmth"	4:31
15.	"Yeti"	4:13
Total length:		53:36

== Charts ==
Chart performance for Cacophony
Chart (2024)	Peak position
UK Albums Sales (OCC)	16
UK Album Downloads (OCC)	17
UK Independent Albums (OCC)	8
