= Fuck the World =

Fuck the World may refer to:

== Songs ==
- "Fuck the World" (Insane Clown Posse song), 1999
- "Fuck the World" (Rod Wave song), 2020
- "Fuck the World (F.T.W.)", by Turbonegro, 2003
- "Fuck the World", by 2Pac from Me Against the World, 1995
- "Fuck the World", by Dope from American Apathy, 2005
- "Fuck the World", by Hollywood Undead from Day of the Dead, 2015
- "Fuck tha World", by Lil Wayne from Tha Block Is Hot, 1999
- "Fuck the World", by the Queers from Love Songs for the Retarded, 1993
- "Fuck the World", by the Vines from Winning Days, 2004

== Other uses ==
- Fuck the World (artwork), a 2018 mural by Carolina Falkholt
- Fuck the World Championship, a professional wrestling championship
- Kesha and the Creepies: Fuck the World Tour, a 2016–2017 concert tour by Kesha
- Fuck the World (EP), 2020

== See also ==
- FTW (disambiguation)
