= FTW =

FTW or ftw may refer to:

== Places ==
- Fort Worth area:
  - Fort Worth, Texas, the city itself
  - Fort Worth Central Station
  - Fort Worth Meacham International Airport
- Fort Wayne, Indiana

== Songs ==
- "F.T.W." (The Vines song)
- "FTW" (Lets Be Friends song)
- "Fuck the World (F.T.W.)", by Turbonegro
- "F.T.W.", by MC Chris from Dungeon Master of Ceremonies
- "F.T.W.", by Sword from Metalized
- "F.T.W.", by Tiger Army from Tiger Army II: Power of Moonlite
- "F.T.W.", by Xiu Xiu from Women As Lovers
- "F.T.W.", by Deez Nuts from Stay True

== Other ==
- Fort William railway station, Highland, Scotland, by National Rail station code
- F.T.W. (film) (1994)
- FTW Championship, a professional wrestling championship
- .ftw, extension for Family Tree Maker files
- Fucking Trans Women, a 2010 zine by Mira Bellwether
- Furious Truckstop Waitresses, a Tucson Roller Derby team

== See also ==
- For the win, in Internet slang
- For the Win, a 2010 science fiction novel by Cory Doctorow
- Fuck the World (disambiguation)
- Fare Thee Well (disambiguation)
