= Thug Motivation =

Thug Motivation may refer to:

- "Thug Motivation", a song by Rod Wave from his 2020 album Pray 4 Love
- Let's Get It: Thug Motivation 101, a 2005 album by Young Jeezy
