= Taiwan Literature Awards =

Taiwanese Literary Award

The Taiwan Literature Awards is a nationally recognized literary award in Taiwan. Initially founded by the Council for Cultural Affairs of the Republic of China in 2001, it has been organized by the National Museum of Taiwan Literature since 2005. The award ceremony takes place annually, recognizing outstanding literary works in two major categories: "Taiwan Literature Awards for Books" for published books and "Taiwan Literature Awards for Original Works" to encourage writing in native languages.

== History ==
The inaugural iteration of the award was the "First Taiwan Provincial Literary Award" organized by the Cultural Affairs Bureau of the Taiwan Provincial Government in 1998. Following the abolishment of the province, preparation of the award was transferred to the Council for Cultural Affairs of the Executive Yuan in 2002 and carried out by the private organization Literary Taiwan Foundation (文學臺灣) until 2004. In 2005, the Council for Cultural Affairs transferred the management of the Taiwan Literature Awards to the National Museum of Taiwan Literature.

In 2005, the total number of submissions to the Taiwan Literature Awards fell from 794 in 2004 to 378 in 2005. In 2006, the number of submissions rose to 606. In August 2006, the Council for Cultural Affairs issued a directive stating that the 2006 Taiwan Literature Awards should be reviewed as soon as possible to consider the possibility of transforming the award by its representativeness and the quality of participants, in order to establish itself as a national-level award.

=== Current format ===
In 2007, the award underwent a transformation in its submission format. Combining it with publications, the award now includes two main categories: Books Category, covering full-length novels and new poetry (rotating with essays since 2010), and Original Works Category, encompassing scriptwriting. In 2008, Awards for Original Works in Native Languages was introduced, with categories rotating annually among Taiwanese, Hakka, Indigenous languages, and Mandarin, covering genres as poetry, prose, and short stories. Starting from 2019, the Bud Awards was introduced to honor three new writers annually. In 2020, the Award for Original Works was held in a separate ceremony from the Golden Melody Awards.

== TLA Annual Golden Grand Laurel Award ==
The TLA Annual Golden Grand Laurel Award is the top award given at the Taiwan Literature Awards. Past winners include:

- 2020: Ghost Town by Kevin Chen (陳思宏)
- 2021: Farewell (別送) by Chung Wen-Yin (鍾文音)
- 2022: The White Portrait by Kaori Lai (賴香吟)
- 2023: The Book of Wreckage (殘骸書) by Chen Lieh (陳列)
- 2024: The Land of Dreams and Spirits (夢魂之地) by Ping Lu (平路)
- 2025: Lightning in July (七月爍爁) by Lin Chun-Ying (林俊頴)
