= Thief in the Night (song) =

2020 single by Rod Wave

Single by Rod Wave

from the album Pray 4 Love
- Released: February 28, 2020
- Length: 2:12
- Label: Alamo
- Songwriters: Rodarius Green; Kendrell Mattox; Trentay Robinson
- Producers: DrellOnTheTrack; Trillo Beatz

Rod Wave singles chronology
"Thug Motivation" (2020)	"Thief in the Night" (2020)	"Pray 4 Love" (2020)

Music video
- "Thief in the Night" on YouTube

"Thief in the Night" is a song by American rapper Rod Wave, released on February 28, 2020 as the third single from his second studio album Pray 4 Love (2020).

== Composition ==
The song contains a "soulful" blend of piano and guitar, over which Rod Wave hums and sing-raps about a breakup, relating it to gunplay, in one verse.

== Music video ==
The music video was directed by Cole Bennett and released alongside the single.

== Charts ==
Chart (2020)	Peak position
US Billboard Hot 100	74
US Hot R&B/Hip-Hop Songs (Billboard)	35

== Certifications ==
Region	Certification	Certified units/sales
United States (RIAA)	Platinum	1,000,000^{‡}
^{‡} Sales+streaming figures based on certification alone.
