= Farewell =

Farewell or fare well is a parting phrase. The terms may also refer to:

== Places ==
- Farewell, Missouri, a community in the United States
- Farewell and Chorley, a location in the United Kingdom near Lichfield, site of the former Farewell Priory
- Cape Farewell (disambiguation), multiple places

== Films ==
- Farewell (1930 film) (German: Abschied), a film directed by Robert Siodmak
- Farewells (Polish: Pożegnania), a 1958 film directed by Wojciech Has
- Farewell (1967 film) (Gobyeol), a South Korean film starring Shin Young-kyun
- Farewell (1972 film) (Jagbyeol), a South Korean film starring Namkoong Won
- Farewell (1983 film) (Proshchanie), a film directed by Elem Klimov
- The Farewell (2000 film), a 2000 German film
- Farewell (2009 film) (L'affaire Farewell), a 2009 French film
- The Farewell (2019 film), a 2019 American film

== Music ==
=== Groups and labels ===
- Farewell (band), an American pop-punk band

=== Classical ===
- Farewell Symphony, Symphony No. 45 by Haydn
- Piano Sonata No. 26 (Beethoven), known as "Das Lebewohl" or "Les Adieux" ("The Farewell")
- Waltz in A-flat major, Op. 69, No. 1 (Chopin), called also The Farewell Waltz or Valse de l'adieu.
- "Farewell", the final movement in Waldszenen, op. 82 by Robert Schumann

=== Albums ===
- Farewell (Divinefire album), 2008
- Farewell (Oingo Boingo album), 1996
- Farewell (Gil Evans album), 1986
- Farewell (The Seekers album), 2019
- Farewell (The Supremes album), 1970
- Farewell (Tomiko Van album), 2006
- Farewell (Toshiko Akiyoshi – Lew Tabackin Big Band album), 1980
- Farewell, a 2003 album by Clan of Xymox
- Farewell (EP), a 2024 EP by Lil Tjay

=== Songs ===
- "Farewell" (Bob Dylan song), 1963
- "Farewell" (Rihanna song), 2011
- "Farewell" (Rod Stewart song), 1974
- "Farewell", a single by Congreso
- "Farewell", by Almah from Unfold
- "Farewell", by The Amity Affliction from Let the Ocean Take Me
- "Farewell", by Apocalyptica from Apocalyptica
- "Farewell", by Avantasia from The Metal Opera
- "Farewell", by Eminem from Music to Be Murdered By
- "Farewell", by Enforcer from From Beyond
- "Farewell", by Freedom Call from Crystal Empire
- "Farewell", by Heavenly from Carpe Diem
- "Farewell", by Kamelot from Epica
- "Farewell", by Sentenced from Frozen
- "Farewell", a series of songs by Seventh Wonder from Tiara
- "Farewell", by Shadow of Intent from Elegy
- "Farewell", by Simple Plan from Taking One for the Team
- "Farewell", by Starkill from Shadow Sleep
- "Farewell", by The Yardbirds from Roger the Engineer
- "Farewell", composed by A. R. Rahman from the film soundtrack Million Dollar Arm
- "Drum bun" (meaning "Farewell"), a popular military and patriotic Romanian song

== Other uses ==
- Farewell, the code-name of the KGB defector Vladimir Vetrov
- Farewell (Ayşe Kulin) (Turkish: Veda), a 2008 novel by Ayşe Kulin
- Farewell, a novella by Han Kang
- Farewell, a bronze relief by Ivan Zajec at Prešeren Monument, Ljubljana, Slovenia
- "Farewell", a 2006 episode of the television series 12 oz. Mouse
- "Farewell" (Sugar episode), a 2024 episode of the television series Sugar

== See also ==
- Fare Thee Well (disambiguation)
- Farwell (disambiguation)
