= Fires of Life =

Studio album by Starkill
- Released: 13 May 2013 (North America); 16 May 2013 (Europe, Australia and New Zealand)
- Recorded: Recorded by Chuck Macak and Don Byczynski at Electrowerks Music Production, mastered by James Murphy
- Genres: Melodic death metal, symphonic death metal, power metal
- Length: 54:44
- Label: Century Media
- Producers: Parker Jameson, Spencer Weidner, and Charlie Federici

Starkill chronology
Fires of Life (2013)	Virus of the Mind (2014)

Professional ratings
Review scores
Source	Rating
Metal Mouth	10/10 stars
Metal Underground	3.5/5 stars
The Metal Forge	7/10 stars
Metal Rage	8.1/10 stars

Fires of Life is the first studio album by American melodic death metal band Starkill. It was released on 13 May 2013 in North America and Europe on 16 May 2013 on CD and digital download. A music video for "Fires of Life" was released on 8 February 2013; followed by another video for "New Infernal Rebirth" on 28 March 2013, and a music video for "Sword, Spear, Blood, Fire", which was released on 11 April 2014.

== Track listing ==
No.	Title	Length
1.	"Whispers of Heresy"	6:25
2.	"Fires of Life"	4:48
3.	"Sword, Spear, Blood, Fire"	4:54
4.	"Below the Darkest Depths"	5:17
5.	"Immortal Hunt"	6:31
6.	"New Infernal Rebirth"	4:53
7.	"Strength in the Shadow"	4:56
8.	"This Is Our Battle; This Is Our Day"	5:28
9.	"Withdrawn from All Humanity"	4:05
10.	"Wash Away the Blood with Rain"	7:27
Total length:		54:44

== Personnel ==
- Parker Jameson – vocals, guitar, keyboards, orchestral programming
- Charlie Federici – guitar
- Mike Buetsch – bass guitar
- Spencer Weidner – drums
