= Cuban Links =

2019 single by Rod Wave featuring Kevin Gates

Single by Rod Wave featuring Kevin Gates

from the album Ghetto Gospel
- Released: October 11, 2019
- Length: 3:12
- Label: Alamo; Interscope
- Songwriters: Rodarius Green; Kevin Gilyard; Thomas Horton; Aaron Tago; Frank Gilliam III
- Producers: TnTXD; Yung Tago; Tre Gilliam

Rod Wave singles chronology
"Heart on Ice (Remix)" (2019)	"Cuban Links" (2019)	"Close Enough to Hurt" (2019)

Kevin Gates singles chronology
"Bad Intentions (Remix)" (2019)	"Cuban Links" (2019)	"Dreka" (2020)

Music video
- "Cuban Links" on YouTube

"Cuban Links" is a song by American rapper Rod Wave featuring fellow American rapper Kevin Gates. Written alongside producers TnTXD, Yung Tago, and Tre Gilliam, it was released on October 11, 2019 as the second single from the former's debut studio album Ghetto Gospel.

== Background ==
In regard to their collaboration, Rod Wave described to Kevin Gates, "It was smooth, it was literally a 30-minute process. When you came in and laid the verse, it was like it was supposed to happen."

== Composition ==
The song finds the rappers using a melodic, soulful delivery over a trap instrumental. Lyrically, they detail the hardships of street life, including prison, death and paranoia.

== Charts ==
Chart (2019)	Peak position
US Billboard Hot 100	92
US Hot R&B/Hip-Hop Songs (Billboard)	39

== Certifications ==
Region	Certification	Certified units/sales
United States (RIAA)	Platinum	1,000,000^{‡}
^{‡} Sales+streaming figures based on certification alone.
