= Gravity (Starkill album) =

2019 album by Starkill

Studio album by Starkill
- Released: May 17, 2019
- Recorded: 2018
- Genre: Melodic death metal Symphonic metal Power metal
- Length: 49:10
- Producer: Starkill

Starkill chronology
Shadow Sleep (2016)	Gravity (2019)

Singles from Gravity
- 1. "Until We Fall" Released: August 28, 2018; 2. "The Real Enemy" Released: February 28, 2019

Professional ratings
Review scores
Source	Rating
Dead Rhetoric	9.5/10
Metal Temple	7/10

Gravity is the fourth studio album from American metal band Starkill, their first album featuring vocalist Sarah Lynn Collier as a full-time member. Released on May 17, 2019, it was funded through Indiegogo, and features several guest members, including Epica keyboardist/pianist Coen Janssen, Turisas violinist Olli Vänskä, and ex-Swallow the Sun keyboardist Aleksi Munter. The band promoted the album with some touring, including a special performance in Webster Hall, New York City, on January 12, 2020, supporting Epica during that band's Design Your Universe 10th anniversary tour.

== Track listing ==
No.	Title	Length
1.	"Detonate"	3:55
2.	"Until We Fall"	3:31
3.	"Not Alone"	3:50
4.	"Castaway"	4:33
5.	"Emerge"	4:20
6.	"Manufactured Bliss"	4:52
7.	"Fly With Me"	3:14
8.	"Lost to Time"	4:07
9.	"Master of My Life"	3:34
10.	"Evil Inside"	4:10
11.	"Face the Dark"	4:20
12.	"The Real Enemy"	4:44
Total length:		49:10

== Personnel ==
Band members

- Parker Jameson - lead guitar, lead vocals, keyboards, orchestrations
- Sarah Lynn Collier - female vocals
- Tony Keathley - rhythm guitar, backing vocals
- Shaun Andruchuk - bass
- Spencer Weidner - drums

Guests/session musicians

- Coen Janssen - piano
- Aleksi Munter - keyboards
- Olli Vänskä - violin

Miscellaneous staff

- Charles Macak - mixing
- Troy Glessner - mastering
