= Pray 4 Love =

Studio album by Rod Wave
- Released: April 3, 2020
- Genres: Hip hop; Southern hip hop; Contemporary hip hop; Contemporary R&B; Soul; Trap
- Length: 38:38
- Labels: Alamo; Geffen; Interscope
- Producers: Ace Lex; AKel; Bankhead; Benjamin Lasnier; BG Soundz; CedDidit; Dave-O; Daysix; Dmac; DrellOnTheTrack; Drum Dummie; D Swish; Hagan; J Diesel; jetsonmade; Karltin Bankz; Kobé Beats; LC; Lilkdubb; LondnBlue; MalikOTB; Mook On The Beats; Piscot; RellyMade; RTJ; SephGotTheWaves; SonoBeats; SpeakerBangerz; Tahj Money; ThaOnlySensei; Timmy Da HitMan; TnTXD; Tom French; Tre Gilliam; Trillo Beats; Yung Tago; Zypitano

Rod Wave chronology
Ghetto Gospel (2019)	Pray 4 Love (2020)	SoulFly (2021)

Deluxe edition cover

Singles from Pray 4 Love
- 1. "Dark Clouds" Released: November 21, 2019; 2. "Thug Motivation" Released: January 27, 2020; 3. "Thief in the Night" Released: February 28, 2020; 4. "Pray 4 Love" Released: March 18, 2020; 5. "The Greatest" Released: April 1, 2020; 6. "Girl of My Dreams" Released: July 1, 2020; 7. "Through the Wire" Released: July 12, 2020; 8. "Freestyle" Released: July 31, 2020

Pray 4 Love is the second studio album by American rapper and singer Rod Wave, released on April 3, 2020, through Alamo Records, Geffen Records, and Interscope Records. The album features guest appearances from ATR Son Son, Yo Gotti and Lil Baby, alongside production from DrellOnTheTrack, jetsonmade, Karltin Bankz, LondnBlue, Tahj Money, TnTXD, Trillo Beatz, and several other producers. The album serves as a follow-up to Green's debut studio album, Ghetto Gospel (2019). A deluxe edition of the album was released on August 7, 2020, with an additional eleven tracks.

Pray 4 Love received positive reviews from music critics who applauded Green's "raw melodies". The album debuted at number two on the US Billboard 200 chart, in which it earned 72,000 album-equivalent units, of which 2,000 were pure album sales. Seven of the fourteen album tracks debuted on the Billboard Hot 100. The album was supported by eight official singles: "Dark Clouds", "Thug Motivation", "Thief in the Night", "Pray 4 Love", "The Greatest", "Girl of My Dreams", "Through the Wire", and "Freestyle".

== Background and recording ==
On April 3, the day of the album's release, Rod Wave appeared in an interview with Complex's Jessica McKinney, in which he stated that the entirety of the album was recorded in the span of one month and that he was already working on its follow up—which we'd later recognize as the album's deluxe. In the interview, after being asked why the album doesn't have many features, Green went in-depth about his recording process:

Making music for me is personal. When I do my music, I don’t even go to the studio. It's just me and my engineer in a dark room somewhere, recording. [Linking] with others or doing other stuff, I ain't really trying to send the wrong message. I’ll root for anybody doing their thing with the music. I just like doing my own thing. I’ve been like that.

Later in the interview, he was asked about the creative atmosphere surrounding the creation of the album. Green stated that he'd just listen to beats and he'd come up with songs before he and his engineer would set up a studio in a hotel room and record tracks. He also stated that he refrains from doing "studio sessions" with producers and stays to himself with just his engineer. Green explained that his atmosphere is like this because music is personal to him, therefore when recording, he'd prefer the environment to be intimate:

It really be personal for me. If I feel like it was too personal, I ain’t going to drop it. Music is a way of opening up. I don’t really talk about it. When I first started making music, that’s all it was. I never thought I would be on the phone with you right now. I never thought I would be on tour, or that people would want to talk about my album. It was never about that. I just wanted to make music because it’s how I get stuff off my chest. I want it to always feel like my escape. I don't want it to be nothing else, because once you turn it into something else then everything starts changing. I still want music to be my escape.

In an interview with Apple Music, the rapper explained the process of making music, saying that it "helps me talk about [my eating problems]. I don't regret going through none of it, because if it hadn't went down like that, 'Heart on Ice' wouldn't have even been a song. It would have been 'Wrist on Ice'". Generally, he wanted the album listeners to feel like him instead of "pinpoint just one" message.

== Release and promotion ==
On November 21, 2019, Rod Wave released the album's lead single, "Dark Clouds". The album's second single, "Thug Motivation" was released on January 13, 2020, followed by "Thief in the Night" on February 28, and "Pray 4 Love" on March 18. Alongside the release of the track, Rod Wave also announced the release of the album for April 3, 2020. On April 1, Rod Wave released "The Greatest" as the album's fifth single just two days prior to the release of the project. Following the release of the album, on July 1, Pray 4 Love's twelfth cut, "Girl of My Dreams" was released as a single. On July 12 and 31, the singles "Through the Wire" and "Freestyle" were released, respectively. On August 6, Rod Wave released the music video for "Letter from Houston" exclusively on his YouTube channel. The three tracks appeared on the deluxe edition of Pray 4 Love, released on August 7.

== Critical reception ==
Professional ratings
Review scores
Source	Rating
AllMusic	4/5 stars
Pitchfork	7.3/10
The New York Times	(positive)
Tom Hull	B+

Pray 4 Love received positive reviews from music critics. AllMusic's Fred Thomas wrote that the album is a "slightly darker continuation of his 2019 debut Ghetto Gospel". He stated that "Pray 4 Love stays in more or less one gear for its duration" and that "it's a lonely sound, and one Wave goes mostly alone". Concluding his review, he stated that the album "[offers] an even more complete picture of the pain and trauma that molded him as an artist". Writing for Pitchfork Alphonse Pierre described the album as a "soulful record with constant mentions of faith" while noting that "it’s not exactly religious". He noted that at times the project can be "overwhelming" and that "occasionally it’s unnecessarily melodramatic". Pierre concluded his review by writing that "[the album's] straightforward and complicated; unpolished and imperfect" but that's what makes the pain and emotion in it feel "genuine".

Jon Caramanica for The New York Times described the album as "wildly impressive", noting that Green "nails a refreshing blend of pure singing and melodic rapping", writing that "Wave is a true singer who also can rap". Caramanica wrote that "often we hear him singing and rapping all at once, overlaying one track of his vocals atop another, as if he’s healing himself in real time". Tom Hull called it "a hip-hop lovers rock", while Stereogum's Tom Breihan described the project as "a warm and emotionally intense collection of stressed-out laments" with "thoughtful and graceful melodies", while lyrically, he "mostly sing-raps about overcoming huge struggles and then facing more".

Crack ranked the album as the 35th best album of 2020. Writing for Crack, Yemi Abiade stated that Green rapped with the passion of "four Marvin Gayes", describing the project as the "sound of a musician reaching the peak of his powers". Exclaim! ranked the album as the 40th best album of 2020. Erin Lowers for Exclaim! wrote that the album is "enveloped by street tales and raw melodies bound together by the language of pain". Jon Caramanica for The New York Times ranked the album as the third best project of the year, writing that Rod Wave is a "potent R&B crooner working with familiar hip-hop subject matter", however, "his blend is closer to mournful blues". He also stated that Wave's songs are "fresh-air triumphs of the downtrodden".

=== Year-end lists ===
Select year-end rankings of Pray 4 Love
Publication	List	Rank	Ref.
Crack	The Top 50 Albums of 2020	35	
Exclaim!	The Top 50 Albums of 2020	40	
The New York Times (Jon Caramanica)	The Top 50 Albums of 2020	3	

== Commercial performance ==
Pray 4 Love debuted at number two on the US Billboard 200 with 72,000 album-equivalent units (including 2,000 pure album sales) in its first week. It was Rod Wave's highest position on the chart at the time, and is his second US top-10 album. In its second week, the album dropped to number nine on the chart, earning an additional 34,000 units that week. In its third week, the album remained at number nine on the chart, earning 32,000 more units. As of December 2020, the album has earned over 1,035,000 album-equivalent units in the US.

== Track listing ==
Standard edition
No.	Title	Writer(s)	Producer(s)	Length
1.	"Pray 4 Love"	Rodarius Green; Frank Dante Gilliam III	Tre Gilliam	2:58
2.	"Fuck the World"	Green; Tahj Vaughn; Thomas Horton; Malik Bynoe-Fisher	TnTXD; Tahj Money; MalikOTB	2:20
3.	"Thief in the Night"	Green; Kendrell Mattox; Trentay Robinson	DrellOnTheTrack; Trillo Beatz	2:12
4.	"Thug Life"	Green; Gerail Harvey	Relly Made	2:51
5.	"I Remember"	Green; Luke Clay; Horton	TnTXD; LC	3:23
6.	"Rags2Riches" (featuring ATR Son Son)	Green; Adam Janeček; Adarsh Mani	Zypitano; DaySix	2:47
7.	"No Weakness"	Green; David McDowell; Robinson	DMAC; Trillo Beatz	3:04
8.	"Roaming"	Green; Aaron Tago; Mark Bankhead; Randy Turner Jr.; Tracy Maxwell Jr.	80Apes; Yung Tago	2:28
9.	"The Greatest"	Green; Tago; Kyre Trask	Yung Tago; Lil KDubb; hagan	2:49
10.	"Ribbon in the Sky"	Green; Tevin Revell	Drum dummie	2:43
11.	"5% Tints"	Green; Ahmed Tidiane Diop; Lance Donavan Bledsoe; Horton	SonoBeats; Speaker Bangerz; TnTXD; Olivier Bassil	2:38
12.	"Girl of My Dreams"	Green; Alexabier Maxwell	Ace Lex	2:40
13.	"Thug Motivation"	Green; Allen Kelly; Gilliam III	AKel; Tre Gilliam	2:56
14.	"Dark Clouds"	Green; Robinson	Mook on the Beat; Trillo Beatz	2:49
Total length:				38:38

Deluxe edition
No.	Title	Writer(s)	Producer(s)	Length
15.	"Fire & Desire"	Green; Maxwell	Ace Lex	2:20
16.	"Letter from Houston"	Green; Horton; Vaughn; Sterling Reynolds; Lukas Payne; Kelci Ferguson; Taylor Ferguson; James Manning	TnTXD; Tahj Money; LondnBlue; Karltin Bankz	2:53
17.	"Freestyle"	Green; Horton; Nathan Morrow; Timothy Link	TnTXD; KobéBeats; Timmy da Hitman	2:54
18.	"Sack Right" (featuring Yo Gotti)	Green; Mario Mims; Tahj Morgan; Patrick Piscot; Benjamin Lasnier	jetsonmade; Piscot; Benjamin Lasnier	2:34
19.	"Rags2Riches 2" (featuring Lil Baby)	Green; Dominique Jones; Janeček; Mani	Zypitano; DaySix	3:55
20.	"To My Grave"	Green; Tago; Thomas French; Cedric Franklin Jr.	Yung Tago; Tom French; CedDidIt	3:03
21.	"Smile"	Green; Mattox; Robinson; Joseph Boyden	DrellOnTheTrack; Trillo Beatz; Seph Got the Waves	3:02
22.	"Out My Business"	Green; Horton; Morgan; Jonathan Gaboff	TnTXD; jetsonmade; J Diesel	2:56
23.	"Through the Wire"	Green; Horton; Vaughn; Reynolds; Payne	TnTXD; Tahj Money; LondnBlue; Karltin Bankz	3:43
24.	"FrFr"	Green; Darian Alston; Keith Sweat; Allan Smith	D Swish	2:35
25.	"Ain't Mad at You"	Green; Mattox; Kelly	DrellOnTheTrack; Trillo Beatz; AKel	3:00
Total length:				68:55

== Charts ==
=== Weekly charts ===
Chart performance for Pray 4 Love
Chart (2020)	Peak position
Canadian Albums (Billboard)	54
US Billboard 200	2
US Top R&B/Hip-Hop Albums (Billboard)	2

=== Year-end charts ===
2020 year-end chart performance for Pray 4 Love
Chart (2020)	Position
US Billboard 200	33
US Top R&B/Hip-Hop Albums (Billboard)	16

2021 year-end chart performance for Pray 4 Love
Chart (2021)	Position
US Billboard 200	49
US Top R&B/Hip-Hop Albums (Billboard)	31

2022 year-end chart performance for Pray 4 Love
Chart (2022)	Position
US Billboard 200	92
US Top R&B/Hip-Hop Albums (Billboard)	82

2023 year-end chart performance for Pray 4 Love
Chart (2023)	Position
US Billboard 200	131

== Certifications ==
Certifications for Pray 4 Love
Region	Certification	Certified units/sales
Canada (Music Canada)	Gold	40,000^{‡}
United States (RIAA)	2× Platinum	2,000,000^{‡}
^{‡} Sales+streaming figures based on certification alone.

== Release history ==
Release dates and formats for Pray 4 Love
Region	Date	Label(s)	Format(s)	Edition(s)	Ref.
Various	April 3, 2020	Alamo; Geffen	Digital download; streaming	Standard	
Various	August 7, 2020	Alamo; Geffen	Digital download; streaming	Deluxe	
United States	December 1, 2023	Alamo; Geffen	LP	Standard	
United States	November 1, 2024	Alamo	LP	Standard	

== See also ==
- 2020 in hip hop music
