= Starkill =

American heavy metal band

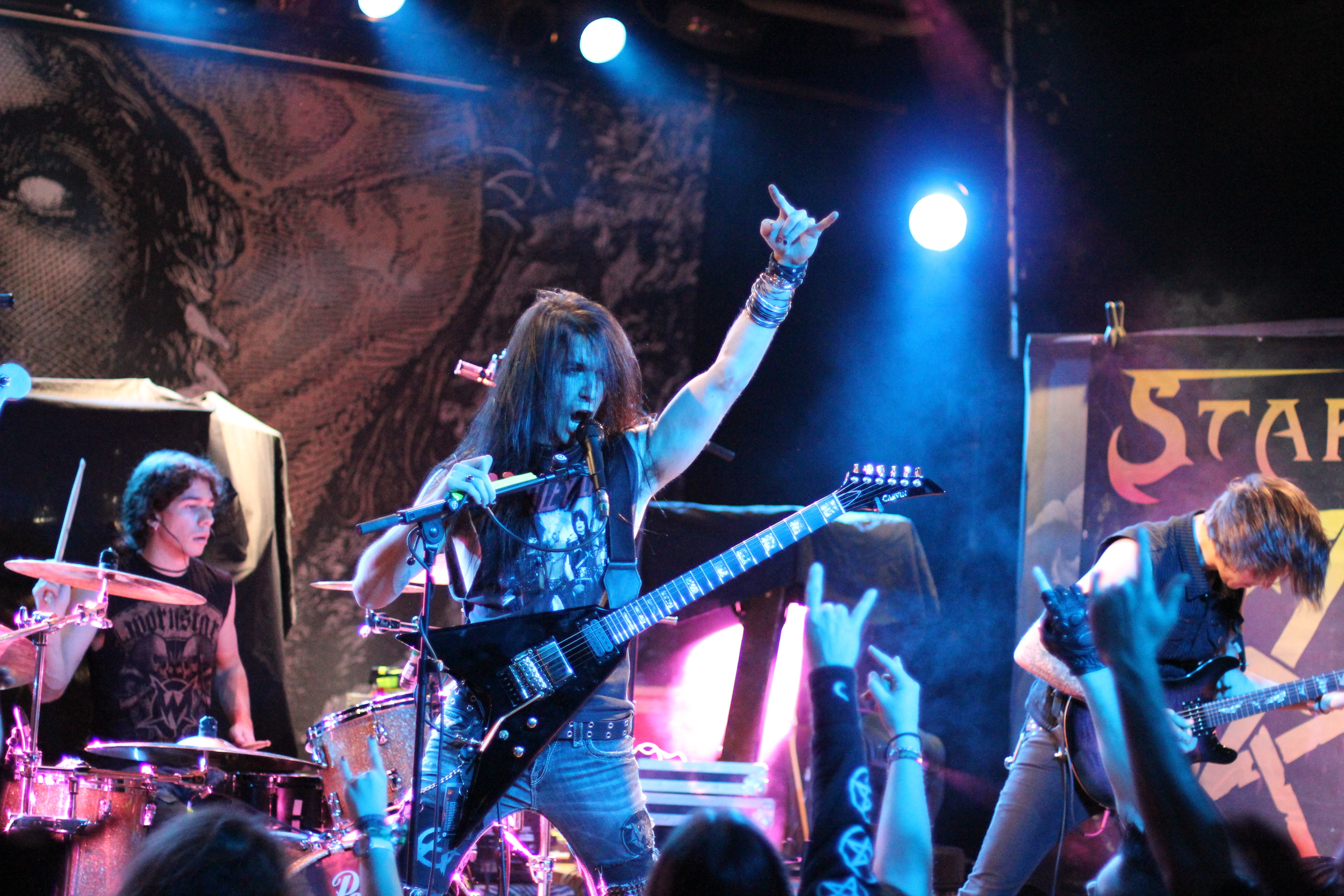
- Starkill in 2013

Background information
- Origin: Chicago, Illinois
- Genres: Melodic death metal Symphonic metal Power metal
- Years active: 2012–present
- Labels: Century Media; Prosthetic Records
- Members: Parker Jameson; Spencer Weidner; Tony Keathley; Sarah Lynn Collier; Kevin Spielmann
- Past members: Charlie Federici; Mike Buetsch; Shaun Andruchuk
- Website: Starkill Official Facebook

Starkill is an American metal band from the northwest suburbs of Chicago, Illinois.

The members met and began writing materials in 2008, eventually signing to Century Media Records on 14 December 2012 and releasing Fires of Life on 16 May 2013.

The band has incorporated many different musical styles, giving them a general sound of melodic death metal, symphonic metal, and power metal.

== History ==
=== Foundation and Fires of Life (2012-2014) ===
Founding members, and brothers, Parker Jameson and Spencer Weidner had been writing material since their early teens, yet had difficulty putting together a full band due to the lack of like-minded, capable musicians in their hometown. Because of this, Parker enrolled at Indiana University, hoping the school's music program would expose him to musicians with similar aspirations. Shortly after beginning his freshman year at Indiana University, Parker met guitarist Charlie Federici. The two discovered that they shared similar musical influences and goals, and with the addition of Charlie, the core of the band was formed.

The three began writing and performing material under various names in the Indiana and Midwest regions, eventually attracting the attention of Century Media Records in early 2012 while subsequently and permanently settling on the name Starkill. The band began recording their debut album at Electrowerks Studios that summer, and announced their signing with Century Media months later in December. Their debut album, Fires of Life, was released in May 2013 and then the band toured around North America and Europe.

=== Virus of the Mind (2014-2016) ===
On April 11, 2014, Starkill released a music video for "Sword, Spear, Blood, Fire" and announced plans to record a new album at Electrowerks Studio with producer Chuck Macak with an expected release date in the fall of 2014. On July 17, 2014, the album artwork, title and release dates were revealed for the album, entitled Virus of the Mind. The scheduled release dates were October 14, 2014 in the US and Canada and October 20, 2014, in Europe, Australia and New Zealand.

On August 7, 2014, the first song off the album, "Breaking the Madness", was released on the Century Media Records YouTube channel, as well as the track listing and lineup of the album. A video discussing the recording of the album, dubbed "Creating The Virus - Part 1" was released on August 21, 2014, followed by a second video, "Creating The Virus - Part 2" on September 17, 2014.

The first video off the album "Before Hope Fades", was released on YouTube on October 2, 2014 and on October 13, 2014, the album was made available for streaming on nocleansinging.com. The album was released on October 14, 2014, in the US and Canada and on October 20, 2014, in Europe, Australia and New Zealand. On November 6, 2014, a lyric video of the title track "Virus of the Mind" was released.

=== Shadow Sleep (2016-2019) ===
Starkill announced on February 2, 2016, via their Facebook page, that pre-orders for their third album were being accepted via an Indiegogo campaign with a US$25,000 goal.

Later that year, the band announced their signing to Prosthetic Records and released the title and album of their third full-length record, Shadow Sleep. The album was slated released worldwide November 4, 2016, being tracked and engineered by both Starkill and Charles Macak of Electrowerks Studios, and mastered by Troy Glessner.

=== Gravity (2019-2024) ===
In 2019, Starkill released their fourth studio album, entitled Gravity, funded through Indiegogo. It is the band's first album with their newest band member, female vocalist Sarah Lynn Collier (who already provided guest vocals on the Shadow Sleep album), and features performances and production from members of Epica (Coen Janssen on the piano), Turisas (Olli Vänskä on the violin) and Swallow the Sun (Aleksi Munter on the keyboards).

=== Hanging Up My Halo (2024-present) ===
After the pandemic caused by COVID-19, Starkill started playing live shows again in 2024 and have announced via social media they are working on their fifth album. On October 9, 2026, the band released Death on Display, the lead single from their upcoming album Hanging Up My Halo, set to be released on January 22, 2027.

== Band members ==
Current line-up

- Parker Jameson – lead guitar, vocals, keyboards, programming (2012–present)
- Spencer Weidner – drums (2012–present)
- Tony Keathley – rhythm guitar (2013–present), backing vocals (2014–present)
- Sarah Lynn Collier – vocals (2017–present)
- Kevin Spielmann – bass (2024–present)

Previous members

- Charlie Federici – rhythm guitar (2012–2013)
- Mike Buetsch – bass (2012-2013)
- Shaun Andruchuk – bass (2014–2020)

== Discography ==
=== Studio albums ===
- Fires of Life (2013)
- Virus of the Mind (2014)
- Shadow Sleep (2016)
- Gravity (2019)
- Hanging Up My Halo (2027)

=== Singles & EPs ===
- All I Want for Christmas Is You (Mariah Carey cover) (2017)
- The Pretender (Foo Fighters cover) (2018)
- Until We Fall (2018)
- Evil Inside (2018)
- Burn Your World (2020)
- Reckless and Infinite (2020)
- Shadow Sleep (2020)
- Cloudless (2021)
- Walk Through Fire (2021)
- Silhouettes (2022)
- Ruin (2022)

=== Music videos ===
- Fires of Life
- New Infernal Rebirth
- Sword, Spear, Blood, Fire
- Before Hope Fades
- Breaking the Madness
- Until We Fall
- Evil Inside
- All I Want for Christmas Is You
- The Real Enemy
- Detonate
- Not Alone
- Burn Your World
- Reckless and Infinite
- Shadow Sleep
- The Pretender
- Cloudless
- Walk Through Fire
