= Ghetto Gospel (album) =

Studio album by Rod Wave
- Released: November 1, 2019
- Genre: Hip-hop; Contemporary R&B
- Length: 39:52
- Label: Alamo; Interscope
- Producer: AceLexOnDaTrack; Ashton Sellars; BJ Beatz; Blake Slatkin; Consent2k; DiCaprio Beatz; Drum Dummie; FJ; Governor; Iceberg Beatz; IllWill Beats; Mac Josh; MalikOTB; Mook on the Beats; Motif Alumni; Nashi; Reuel; SephGotTheWaves; SpeakerBangerz; Tahj Money; TnTXD; Tre Gilliam; Trillo Beats; Tyler Javeon; Yung Tago

Rod Wave chronology
PTSD (2019)	Ghetto Gospel (2019)	Pray 4 Love (2020)

Singles from Ghetto Gospel
- 1. "Heart on Ice" Released: September 27, 2019; 2. "Cuban Links" Released: October 11, 2019; 3. "Close Enough to Hurt" Released: October 23, 2019

Ghetto Gospel is the debut studio album by American rapper and singer Rod Wave, released on November 1, 2019, through Alamo Records and Interscope Records. The album features guest appearances from Kevin Gates, who also served as its executive producer, and Lil Durk. The production on the record was primarily handled by AceLexOnDaTrack and Yung Tago with assistance from Ashton Sellars, Blake Slatkin, Drum Dummie, MalikOTB, SephGotTheWaves, SpeakerBangerz, Tahj Money, TnTXD, and several other producers. The album serves as a follow-up to Green's fifth mixtape, PTSD (2019).

Ghetto Gospel received generally positive reviews from critics, who praised Green's vocal performance and subject matter on the record. The album debuted at number fourteen on the US Billboard 200 in its first week, earning over 20,000 album-equivalent units, of which 651 were pure album sales. In its second week, the album peaked at number ten on the chart, with a 24% increase in sales, moving an additional 27,000 units. The album was supported by three official singles, "Heart on Ice", "Cuban Links" featuring Kevin Gates, and "Close Enough to Hurt".

== Release and promotion ==
On May 31, 2019, Rod Wave released the album's lead single, "Heart on Ice" which would first appear on his fourth commercial mixtape, PTSD. However, following its release, the song began to go viral on social media resulting in it appearing on Ghetto Gospel. The album's second single, "Cuban Links" featuring Kevin Gates was released on October 11, 2019. The album's third and final single, "Close Enough to Hurt" was released on October 23, 2019, just a week prior to the release of the album. Alongside the release of the single, Rod Wave announced the album while also reporting that Kevin Gates would act as an executive producer. In January 2020, Green announced his 22-stop U.S. Ghetto Gospel Tour. The tour was set to begin on March 3, 2020, in Augusta, Georgia, and to conclude on April 3, in St. Petersburg, Florida; however, several tour dates were canceled due to the COVID-19 pandemic.

== Critical reception ==
Professional ratings
Review scores
Source	Rating
HipHopDX	2.8/5
Pitchfork	8.0/10

Ghetto Gospel was met with generally positive reviews. At Album of the Year, the album received an average score of 68 out of 100, based on two reviews.

Writing for HipHopDX, Kenan Draughorne described the album as a "summation of all his pain, packaged together" highlighting "his vocal performances [that] shine throughout the album". However, Draughorne wrote that he sensed an "overall lack of ambition" on the project and noted that the trap beats are "bland". Concluding his review, he wrote that his "artistic potential" is "sky-high", though the album in its entirety is a "missed opportunity". Pitchfork's Alphonse Pierre describes the album's sound as "bloodletting over somber pianos and country guitars". He notes that Rod is at the "forefront" of "pain music".

== Commercial performance ==
Ghetto Gospel debuted at number 14 on the US Billboard 200, earning over 20,000 album-equivalent units (including 651 pure album sales) in its first week. The album also accumulated a total of 24.8 million on-demand streams of the album's fourteen tracks. In its second week, the album climbed to number 10 on the chart, earning an additional 27,000 album-equivalent units, which was a 24% increase from its debut week sales. The album marked Green's first entry on the Billboard 200 and his first top ten. On May 20, 2020, the album was certified gold by the Recording Industry Association of America for combined sales and album-equivalent units of over 500,000 units in the United States. On July 21, 2021, the album was certified platinum, signifying over 1,000,000 album-equivalent units sold in the United States.

== Track listing ==
Ghetto Gospel track listing
No.	Title	Writer(s)	Producer(s)	Length
1.	"Sky Priority"	Rodarius Green; Francis Mensah Jr.; Brayon Nelson; Troy Matthew	FJ; Mook on the Beat	2:59
2.	"Dark Conversations"	Green; Thomas Horton; Reuel Ethan; Matthew	TnTXD; Reuel Ethan	2:25
3.	"Close Enough to Hurt"	Green; Noel Sellars; Tevin Revell; Matthew	Ashton Sellars; Drum Dummie	2:15
4.	"Green Light"	Green; Edgar Bustos	Nashi	2:02
5.	"Brace Face"	Green; Trentay Robinson	Trillo Beatz; Ill Will Beatz^{[a]}	2:42
6.	"Poison"	Green; Aaron Tago; Tyler Javeon	Yung Tago; Tyler Javeon	3:16
7.	"Cuban Links" (featuring Kevin Gates)	Green; Kevin Gilyard; Horton; Tago; Frank Gilliam III	TnTXD; Yung Tago; Tre Gilliam	3:12
8.	"Soldier Life"	Green; Alexabier Maxwell	AceLexOnDaTrack	2:38
9.	"Counted Steps"	Green; Horton; Tago; Tahj Vaughn	TnTXD; Yung Tago; Tahj Money; SephGotTheWaves^{[a]}	2:53
10.	"Titanic" (featuring Kevin Gates)	Green; Gilyard; Tago; Brandon Russell	Yung Tago; BJ Beatz	3:52
11.	"Extra"	Green; Justin-Kevin Arndt; Marcus Rucker	Consent2k; Motif Alumni^{[a]}	2:25
12.	"Abandoned"	Green; Maxwell	AceLexOnDaTrack	4:06
13.	"Chip on My Shoulder"	Green; Blake Slatkin; Dylan Berg	Blake Slatkin; Iceberg Beatz	1:52
14.	"Heart on Ice (Remix)" (featuring Lil Durk)	Green; Durk Banks; Johnathan Servance; Malik Bynoe-Fisher; Lance Bledsoe	Dicaprio Beatz; MalikOTB; Speaker Bangerz	3:15
Total length:				39:52

Notes

- ^{^[a]} signifies an uncredited producer

== Charts ==
=== Weekly charts ===
Weekly chart performance for Ghetto Gospel
Chart (2019)	Peak position
US Billboard 200	10
US Top R&B/Hip-Hop Albums (Billboard)	7
US Top Rap Albums (Billboard)	5

=== Year-end charts ===
2020 year-end chart performance for Ghetto Gospel
Chart (2020)	Position
US Billboard 200	35
US Top R&B/Hip-Hop Albums (Billboard)	18

2021 year-end chart performance for Ghetto Gospel
Chart (2021)	Position
US Billboard 200	157

2022 year-end chart performance for Ghetto Gospel
Chart (2022)	Position
US Billboard 200	180

== Certifications ==
Certifications for Ghetto Gospel
Region	Certification	Certified units/sales
United States (RIAA)	Platinum	1,000,000^{‡}
^{‡} Sales+streaming figures based on certification alone.

== Release history ==
Release dates and formats for Ghetto Gospel
Region	Date	Label(s)	Format(s)	Edition(s)	Ref.
Various	November 1, 2019	Alamo; Interscope	Digital download; streaming	Standard	
United States	December 1, 2023	Alamo; Interscope	LP	Standard	
United States	November 1, 2024	Alamo Records	LP	Standard	
