= Book of the Wicked, Chapter One =

Mixtape by DJ Clay
- Released: June 8, 2010
- Recorded: 2009–2010
- Genre: Hip hop
- Length: 55:12
- Label: Hatchet House
- Producer: DJ Clay

DJ Clay chronology
Let 'Em Bleed: The Mixxtape, Vol. 4 (2009)	Book of the Wicked, Chapter One (2010)	Book of the Wicked, Chapter Two (2010)

Book of the Wicked, Chapter One is a mixtape by DJ Clay. Released in 2010, it is the first installment of a series of mixtapes which contain brand new and remixed songs from artists from the Psychopathic Records and Hatchet House roster. The second chapter was released on December 7, 2010.

== Background ==
On February 19, 2008, DJ Clay released Let 'Em Bleed: The Mixxtape, Vol. 1, the first installment of a series of mixtapes which contain brand new and remixed songs from artists from the Psychopathic Records and Hatchet House roster. Clay continued the series through 2009. That June, Mike E. Clark began his own series of mixtapes with Psychopathic Murder Mix Volume 1. On March 23, 2010, all four Let 'Em Bleed mixtapes were released in the Let 'Em Bleed: The Mixxtapes Boxset. In the May 7 edition of the Hatchet Herald, it was announced that DJ Clay would be releasing a new series of mixtapes called Book of the Wicked.

== Production ==
The original version of the song "Fuck the World" (remix) is by Insane Clown Posse, from their album The Amazing Jeckel Brothers. The song "I Live My Life on Stage" features the beat from Boondox's song "Untold/Unwritten," from his album Krimson Creek.

== Track listing ==
#	Title	Time	Performer(s)	Producer(s)	Additional Information
1	"Introduction"	2:27	DJ Clay	DJ Clay; Eric Davie	Additional guitar by Willie E. Additional vocals by Mike Fortunate
2	"The Opener"	4:39	Violent J	DJ Clay	
3	"Elephants in the Room"	2:36	DJ Clay	Dubmuzik	
4	"Fuck the World" (remix)	2:46	AMB	Mike E. Clark	
5	"Field Reporter One" (skit)	0:55		Eric Davie	Additional vocals by Greg Dery
6	"Rock It Out"	4:48	Blaze	Eric Davie	
7	"Would You Die For Me"	3:43	ABK	Willie E.	Additional guitar by Willie E.
8	"Anchorman" (skit)	0:37			Additional vocals by Mike Fortunate
9	"World Upside Down"	2:52	AMB	DJ Clay	
10	"I'm Addicted"	3:18	DJ Clay	Dubmuzik	
11	"Star Dust" (remix)	4:06	Twiztid	DJ Clay	
12	"Secretary of Defense" (skit)	0:27			Additional vocals by Robby Grahm
13	"Catch Me If I Fall"	4:00	Boondox	DJ Clay	
14	"Soopa Ninja"	2:57	Violent J	Kuma	
15	"War Paint"	1:57	ABK	Eric Davie	
16	"Field Reporter Two" (skit)	0:28			Additional vocals by Leah Compagnoni
17	"Whoop!"	4:06	Insane Clown Posse, DJ Clay, and AMB	DJ Clay	
18	"What My Name Is"	2:25	Blaze	DJ Clay; Otis	
19	"I Live My Life On Stage"	3:59	Shaggy 2 Dope	Kuma	
20	"The Ending"	2:07			

== Personnel ==
=== Musicians ===
- Mike E. Clark - producer
- Leah Compagnoni - skit vocals
- Eric Davie - producer
- Greg Dery - skit vocals
- DJ Clay - producer, vocals
- Mike Fortunate - skit vocals
- Robby Grahm - skit vocals
- Dub Musik - producer
- Willie E. - additional guitar
- Violent J - vocals
- Axe Murder Boys - vocals
- Blaze - vocals
- Anybody Killa - vocals
- Twiztid - vocals
- Boondox - vocals
- Shaggy 2 Dope - vocals

== Charts ==
Chart (2010)	Peak position
US Top Heatseekers	12
