= Virus of the Mind (album) =

Studio album by Starkill
- Released: 2014
- Genre: Melodic death metal Symphonic black metal Power metal
- Producer: Spencer Weidner, Parker Jameson and Charles Macak

Starkill chronology
Fires of Life (2013)	Virus of the Mind (2014)	Shadow Sleep (2016)

Professional ratings
Review scores
Source	Rating
Rock Hard	6.5/10

Virus of the Mind is the second studio album of the American melodic death metal band Starkill. Before its release in 2014, it was made available to preorder throughout an Indiegogo campaign.

Official music videos have been released for "Before Hope Fades" and "Breaking the Madness".

== Track listing ==
No.	Title	Length
1.	"Be Dead or Die"	4:37
2.	"Winter Desolation"	5:15
3.	"Breaking the Madness"	3:55
4.	"Virus of the Mind"	4:44
5.	"Skyward"	4:05
6.	"Before Hope Fades"	4:51
7.	"Into Destiny"	4:02
8.	"God of This World"	5:39
9.	"My Catharsis"	3:54
10.	"Convergence"	4:16
Total length:		45:22

== Personnel ==
Starkill

- Parker Jameson - vocals, guitars, keyboards, orchestrations
- Spencer Weidner - drums
- Tony Keathley - guitars
- Shaun Andruchuk - bass

Guest/session musicians

- James Malone - additional vocals (track 2)
- Nedim Melkic - piano (track 7)

Production

- Spencer Weidner - producer
- Parker Jameson - producer
- Charles Macak - producer, engineering, mixing, mastering
- Kevin Doti - engineering
- Nedim Melkic - engineering (assistant)
- Ron Duffy - engineering (assistant)
- Rusalka Design - artwork
- Matt Foster - layout
- Tom Hane - photography
