= Close Enough to Hurt =

2019 single by Rod Wave

Single by Rod Wave

from the album Ghetto Gospel
- Released: October 23, 2019
- Length: 2:15
- Label: Alamo; Interscope
- Songwriters: Rodarius Green; Noel Sellars; Tevin Revell; Troy Matthew
- Producers: Ashton Sellars; Drum Dummie

Rod Wave singles chronology
| "Cuban Links" (2019) | "Close Enough to Hurt" (2019) | "Dark Clouds" (2019) |

Music video
- "Close Enough to Hurt" on YouTube

"Close Enough to Hurt" is a song by American rapper Rod Wave, released on October 23, 2019 as the third single from his debut studio album Ghetto Gospel (2019). It was produced by Ashton Sellars and Drum Dummie.

== Composition ==
The song finds Rod Wave detailing his distrust, paranoia and PTSD, over a beat consisting of mellow guitar strings. Lyrically, he focuses on protecting himself from people that would mistreat him, which he highlights in the chorus.

== Critical reception ==
In regard to the distinction between Rod Wave's rapping and singing styles, Charles Holmes of Rolling Stone wrote that on the song "he employs the ability to vocally switch gears most effectively." Holmes also commented, "As far subject matter goes, 'Close Enough to Hurt' is well-worn territory. It's a song dedicated to the ones who deserted Rod Wave, don't deserve Rod Wave, and hurt Rod Wave. The trope isn't new, but the color he adds to it makes the journey worth it." Kenan Draughorne of HipHopDX responded negatively to the song's production, commenting "Subtle guitar licks on 'Close Enough to Hurt' breathe much-needed life into the instrumentals, but in the scope of the whole album, it's hardly more effective than adding salt and pepper to a rotten piece of chicken."

== Certifications ==
| Region | Certification | Certified units/sales |
|---|---|---|
| United States (RIAA) | Platinum | 1,000,000^{‡} |
^{‡} Sales+streaming figures based on certification alone.
