= The Greatest (Rod Wave song) =

2020 single by Rod Wave

Single by Rod Wave

from the album Pray 4 Love
- Released: April 1, 2020
- Length: 2:48
- Label: Alamo
- Songwriters: Rodarius Green; Aaron Tago; Kyre Trask; Beau Glaser; Hagan Lange
- Producers: Yung Tago; Lil KDubb; BG SOUNDZ; Hagan

Rod Wave singles chronology
"Pray 4 Love" (2020)	"The Greatest" (2020)	"And I Still" (2020)

Music video
- "The Greatest" on YouTube

"The Greatest" is a song by American rapper Rod Wave, released on April 1, 2020, as the fifth single from his second studio album Pray 4 Love (2020).

== Composition ==
In the song, Rod Wave reflects on his struggles in the past, and celebrates his newfound fame. He transitions to his melodic singing voice in the bridge, in which he sings about brighter days coming in his life, and the outro, in which he touches on the impact of his music on his fans.

== Music video ==
The music video was directed by All The Smoke. It contains footage of Rod Wave performing at a concert and interacting with fans.

== Charts ==
Chart performance for "The Greatest"
Chart (2020)	Peak position
US Billboard Hot 100	78
US Hot R&B/Hip-Hop Songs (Billboard)	39

== Certifications ==
Certifications for "The Greatest"
Region	Certification	Certified units/sales
United States (RIAA)	2× Platinum	2,000,000^{‡}
^{‡} Sales+streaming figures based on certification alone.
