= Freestyle (Rod Wave song) =

2020 single by Rod Wave

Single by Rod Wave

from the album Pray 4 Love (Deluxe)
- Released: July 31, 2020
- Length: 2:54
- Label: Alamo; Interscope; Geffen
- Songwriters: Rodarius Green; Timothy Link; Thomas Horton
- Producers: KobéBeats; Timmy Da HitMan; TnTXD

Rod Wave singles chronology
"Through the Wire" (2020)	"Freestyle" (2020)	"Gambling" (2020)

Music video
- "Freestyle" on YouTube

"Freestyle" is a song by American rapper and singer Rod Wave. It was released on July 31, 2020 in the lead up to the deluxe edition of his second studio album Pray 4 Love, which was released on August 7. It is the eight single from the album. The song sees Rod Wave rap-singing about his come up.

== Composition ==
As the title suggests, the song is a freestyle rap, with no proper structure, finding Rod Wave employing a "straightforward" approach, rap-singing about his rising career and perseverance over a soft piano melody and "scintillating" drums.

== Critical reception ==
Alex Zidel of HotNewHipHop gave the song a "VERY HOTTTTT" rating, and stated: "Hopping in the studio and blurting out whatever came to his mind, Wave managed to bring out more emotion than most people would have accomplished bringing a written verse to the studio". AllHipHop opined that "sometimes there's no need to complicate things and in this case with Rod Wave, he's got a formula that works!" HipHopDX's Devon Jefferson named it one the hottest tracks of the week and praised how Rod Wave "exercises his vocal cords with some mental floss bars for the struggle".

== Music video ==
The official video, directed by TRUFilms, was released on July 30, 2020, a day prior to the song's release. It sees Rod wave boasting his riches and flaunting his wealth. Billboard's Heran Mamo noted how the visual "gives fans an exclusive peek of the millions of ways the bright rap rookie stacks his six million in cash, from on the bed of his tour bus to in the bathtub of his hotel room".

== Charts ==
Chart (2020)	Peak position
US Billboard Hot 100	86
US Hot R&B/Hip-Hop Songs (Billboard)	32
US Rolling Stone Top 100	73

== Certifications ==
Region	Certification	Certified units/sales
United States (RIAA)	Platinum	1,000,000^{‡}
^{‡} Sales+streaming figures based on certification alone.
