= Fuck the World (Rod Wave song) =

2020 song by Rod Wave

Song by Rod Wave

from the album Pray 4 Love
- Released: April 3, 2020
- Genre: Trap
- Length: 2:20
- Label: Alamo; Geffen; Interscope
- Songwriters: Rodarius Green; Thomas Horton; Tahj Vaughn; Malik Bynoe-Fisher
- Producers: TnTXD; Tahj Money; MalikOTB

"Fuck the World" is a song by American rapper Rod Wave from his second studio album Pray 4 Love (2020). It was produced by TnTXD, Tahj Money and MalikOTB.

== Composition ==
The song contains trap drums, pianos and electric riffs. It has been described as musically characteristic of country music. Through melodic delivery, Rod Wave performs one long verse, in which he centers on his heartache from being mistreated and describes making his enemies suffer. He is described as giving an "impassioned rant", and "sounding on the brink of a breakdown".

== Charts ==
Chart (2020)	Peak position
US Billboard Hot 100	64
US Hot R&B/Hip-Hop Songs (Billboard)	29

== Certifications ==
Region	Certification	Certified units/sales
United States (RIAA)	Platinum	1,000,000^{‡}
^{‡} Sales+streaming figures based on certification alone.
