= Fuck the World (Insane Clown Posse song) =

Single by Insane Clown Posse

from the album The Amazing Jeckel Brothers
- Released: 1999
- Genre: Midwest hip hop, horrorcore, rap metal
- Length: 3:43
- Label: Island/Psychopathic
- Songwriter(s): Mike E. Clark; Violent J
- Producer(s): Mike E. Clark; ICP

Insane Clown Posse singles chronology
"Another Love Song" (1999)	"Fuck the World" (1999)	"Terrible" (1999)

"Fuck the World" is a song by hip hop duo, Insane Clown Posse, performed by member Violent J, and is their second single from their album The Amazing Jeckel Brothers. The song is one of their best known, notable for using the word "fuck" 105 times, 93 times by Violent J, 10 times by Shaggy 2 Dope, and twice by Jumpsteady.

== Background ==
"We were angry making The Amazing Jeckel Brothers, because that was our way to tell everybody who doubted us during the whole Disney thing to fuck off. We showed it in songs like "Fuck the World;" just sick shit that was saying straight-up what was on our minds."

— Joseph Bruce

In 1996, Insane Clown Posse signed a contract with Disney-owned label Hollywood Records, which reportedly paid US$1 million to purchase their contract from Battery/Jive Records. Their album The Great Milenko, which featured guests Alice Cooper (on vocals), Steve Jones (on guitar), and Slash (on guitar), was recorded and released on June 25, 1997. However, just hours after the release, Hollywood Records pulled the album from stores nationwide, cancelled Insane Clown Posse's in-store signings and nationwide tour, pulled commercials for the album and the music video for "Halls of Illusions" from television, and dropped the group from the label. It was later revealed that Disney pulled the album to prevent further controversy from the Southern Baptist Church who was criticizing Disney at the time because of Disney's promotion of Gay Days at Disneyland. The incident became highly publicized, which resulted in Insane Clown Posse gaining a lot of attention from the media.

During the two years between The Great Milenko and The Amazing Jeckel Brothers, the first album released after the group left Disney, Insane Clown Posse had become nationally known, but were not taken very seriously. While the controversy allowed the duo to attract the attention of Island Records, it also attracted Insane Clown Posse to public criticism for their style and lyrics. Bruce recalls the period as an angry era for the group due to all of the negativity directed toward them. He says that they "used to keep two piles of press at [their] office. One pile was all the positive press [they've] gotten, which was under an inch tall. Then [they] had the negative press pile, which was spilling over the side of a full basket." As a result, The Amazing Jeckel Brothers was recorded as a release for their anger.

To help increase their positive publicity, Island Records hired the Nasty Little Man publicity team. The team set up a photo shoot for Insane Clown Posse that was to appear on the cover of Alternative Press magazine in Cleveland. On the set of the photo shoot, a member of the publicity team approached Bruce and explained that in "Fuck the World", the lyric that stated "Fuck the Beastie Boys and the Dalai Lama" needed to be changed. Insulted, Bruce exclaimed that his music would not be censored again – referring to Disney's previous requirement of censure. Nasty Little Man told Bruce that the Beastie Boys were not only clients of the company but also personal friends, and the Beastie Boys told the company to make Bruce change the lyric. In response, Bruce fired Nasty Little Man and asked its team to leave the photo shoot.

== Concept ==
The song follows an angry Violent J as he curses a wide variety of things. The chorus echoes the same hate for the world illustrated in each verse ("If I only could I'd set the world on fire/Fuck the world/Fuck 'em all"). While the song consists of seemingly mindless cursing throughout most of it, the futility of such rage is illustrated in the final curse, as he adds "and fuck Violent J." Notable people, places, and objects cursed include Beastie Boys, the Dalai Lama, Forrest Gump, Oprah Winfrey, Kyle Petty, Tom Petty, Fred Bear, Ted Nugent, The Count of Monte Cristo, Cisco, Jack Brisco, Jerry Brisco, Titanic, Celine Dion, Dionne Warwick, Berlin Wall, Lyle Lovett, Jumpsteady, Rocky Maivia, Spin, Rolling Stone, VIBE, Bill Clinton, and Violent J himself.

The group also used the line "Fuck the police, and the 5-0 too", which came from the late rapper Eazy-E's song "8 Ball".

== Performance ==
During live shows, Insane Clown Posse will usually change the lyrics to add other insults to people or figures that reflect the current time, public radio, MTV, Blender Magazine, and themselves.

"Fuck the World" was one of the songs performed by Insane Clown Posse at Woodstock '99.

== Cover versions ==
The single was recorded and remixed by the Axe Murder Boys in 2010 for DJ Clay's Book of the Wicked, Chapter One mixtape.

Richard Cheese covers the song in his usual lounge style on his 2020 album Numbers of the Beast.
