= Cape Farewell (disambiguation) =

Cape Farewell may refer to:

- Cape Farewell, New Zealand, northernmost point of the South Island
- Cape Farewell, Greenland, southernmost point in the territory of Greenland
- Cape Farewell, UK, British arts organisation founded in 2002 to explore climate change through the cultural sector
