= Pray 4 Love (song) =

2020 single by Rod Wave

Single by Rod Wave

from the album Pray 4 Love
- Released: March 18, 2020
- Length: 2:58
- Label: Alamo
- Songwriters: Rodarius Green; Frank Dante Gilliam III
- Producer: Tre Gilliam

Rod Wave singles chronology
"Thief in the Night" (2020)	"Pray 4 Love" (2020)	"The Greatest" (2020)

Music video
- "Pray 4 Love" on YouTube

"Pray 4 Love" is a song by American rapper and singer Rod Wave, released on March 18, 2020 as the fourth single from his second studio album of the same name.

== Composition ==
On the song Rod Wave raps, and sings over a mid-tempo instrumental, with R&B influences that can be heard on the transitions played on piano. He discusses topics about his "varying friendships" and other life experiences, such as trust issues and wariness around beautiful women. In an interview with Complex regarding his album Pray 4 Love, Wave stated that the song was "a summary for the album".

== Charts ==
Chart (2020)	Peak position
US Billboard Hot 100	67
US Hot R&B/Hip-Hop Songs (Billboard)	30

== Certifications ==
Region	Certification	Certified units/sales
United States (RIAA)	Gold	500,000^{‡}
^{‡} Sales+streaming figures based on certification alone.
