= Shadow Sleep =

Studio album by Starkill
- Released: November 4, 2016
- Genre: Melodic death metal Symphonic black metal Symphonic metal
- Length: 49:10
- Producer: Starkill

Starkill chronology
Virus of the Mind (2014)	Shadow Sleep (2016)	Gravity (2019)

Singles from Shadow Sleep
- 1. "Burn Your World" Released: September 15, 2016; 2. "Shadow Sleep" Released: October 6, 2016

Professional ratings
Review scores
Source	Rating
Aux Portes Du Metal	14.5/20
Louder Sound	3/5 stars
Powermetal.de	6.5/10
Stormbringer	3.5/5

Shadow Sleep is the third studio album from the American metal band Starkill, their first album featuring vocalist Sarah Lynn Collier, albeit she provided mostly backing vocals on this release. It was released on November 4, 2016 and available for streaming two days prior. Two singles were released in advance, "Burn Your World" and the title track.

== Track listing ==
No.	Title	Music	Length
1.	"Walk Through Fire"	Charlie Federici, Parker Jameson	03:38
2.	"Burn Your World"	Jameson	03:55
3.	"Through the Darkness"	Jameson	03:42
4.	"Shadow Sleep"	Jameson, Spencer Weidner	03:25
5.	"Cloudless"	Jameson	04:02
6.	"Piece of Paradise"	Jameson	03:41
7.	"Ruin"	Jameson, Shaun Andruchuk	04:40
8.	"Into the Grey"	Jameson	04:05
9.	"Razor's Edge"	Jameson	04:07
10.	"No Savior"	Jameson, Andruchuk	03:34
11.	"Erase Me"	Jameson, Andruchuk	03:08
12.	"Farewell"	Jameson	03:36
13.	"Captive of the Night"	Jameson, Andruchuk	03:36
Total length:			49:10

== Personnel ==
Band members

- Spencer Weidner - drums
- Parker Jameson - vocals, guitars, keyboards, orchestrations, programming, engineering
- Tony Keathley - guitars, vocals
- Shaun Andruchuk - bass

Guest/session musician(s)

- Sarah Lynn Collier - female vocals
- Gabrielle Comeau - additional female choir vocals on "Through the Darkness"
- Tamara Filipović - additional female choir vocals on "Through the Darkness"

Miscellaneous staff

- Charles Macak - recording, mixing, engineering
- Troy Glessner - mastering
- Gustavo Sazes - artwork
- Stephen Jensen - photography
- Nedim Melkic - assistant engineer
