= Vistoso Bosses =

R&B duo from Georgia, US

- Origin: Atlanta, Georgia
- Genres: Alternative hip hop; R&B
- Years active: 2008–2010, 2024-present
- Labels: Interscope; Collipark Music; NAL Music
- Members: Taylah P. / Taylor 7 Blayne (Taylor Parker); Kelci (Kelci Ferguson)

Vistoso Bosses are an American duo made up of rappers Taylah P. and Kelci from Atlanta, Georgia. They debuted with the single "Delirious" produced by STJAMES, featuring Soulja Boy Tell 'Em, taken from their 2009 shelved album Confetti. They were also the first women signed to the Collipark Label, founded by Mr. Collipark aka Michael Crooms. They were featured on Space Cowboy's album: the song Party Like Animal.

== Discography ==
=== Mixtapes ===
- The World Would Suck Without Girls (2010)

=== Singles ===
Year	Song	Peak Chart positions	Certifications	Album
Year	Song	US R&B/HH	Certifications	Album
2009	"Delirious" (featuring Soulja Boy Tell 'Em)	78	RMNZ: 2× Platinum	The World Would Suck Without Girls
2010	"Tatted" (featuring Waka Flocka Flame)	—		The World Would Suck Without Girls
