= Fare Thee Well =

Fare Thee Well may refer to:

- "Fare Thee Well" (poem), an 1816 poem by Lord Byron
- "Fare Thee Well" (song), an English folk ballad
- "Dink's Song", or "Fare Thee Well", an American folk song
- Fare Thee Well: Celebrating 50 Years of the Grateful Dead, a series of concerts by former members of the Grateful Dead
  - Fare Thee Well: Celebrating 50 Years of the Grateful Dead (album), an album featuring music from the concerts

== See also ==
- Farewell (disambiguation)
