= Fuck the World (F.T.W.) =

Single by Turbonegro

from the album Scandinavian Leather
- Released: 12 May 2003
- Genre: Heavy metal, rock, punk rock
- Length: 4:12
- Label: Burning Heart (Sweden); Vice (US)
- Songwriter(s): Christer Engen, Rune Grønn, Lars Horntveth, Hans-Eric Husby, Paal Kjaernes, Knut Schreiner, Thomas Seltzer
- Producer(s): Knut Schreiner, Turbonegro

Turbonegro singles chronology
"Get It On" (1998)	"Fuck the World (F.T.W.)" (2003)	"Locked Down" (2003)

"Fuck the World (F.T.W.)" is a single by Norwegian band Turbonegro from their 2003 album Scandinavian Leather, released on 7" vinyl and CD in 2003 by Burning Heart Records. It was also released in the United States on 7" vinyl by Vice Records.

Shortly before the single's release Turbonegro shot a music video for this song in Romania, among others it features the Romanian National Ballet, a gypsy woman's stone-old raven and psycho-sexual scenarios inspired by photographer Helmut Newton.

== Track listing ==
7" single

1. "Fuck the World (F.T.W.)" (Album Version)
2. "Fuck the World (F.T.W.)" (Instrumental Version)

CD single

1. "Fuck the World (F.T.W.)" (Album Version)
2. "Fuck the World (F.T.W.)" (Instrumental Version)
3. "Are You Ready (For Some Darkness)" (Live at Quart Festival, Norway, 6 July 2002)

7" single (Vice Records)

1. "Fuck the World (F.T.W.)" (Album Version)
2. "Are You Ready (For Some Darkness)" (Live at Quart Festival, Norway, 6 July 2002)

== Charts ==
Chart (2003)	Peak position
Norway (VG-lista)	13
