= 2023 in hip-hop =

This article summarizes the events, album releases, and album release dates in hip-hop for the year 2023.

== Events ==
=== January ===
- On January 1, Gangsta Boo died of a drug overdose at the age of 43 in Memphis, Tennessee.
- On January 5, there was a shootout outside DJ Khaled's The Licking Restaurant in Miami, Florida, while filming a French Montana music video.
- On January 7, YoungBoy Never Broke Again married his girlfriend, Jazlyn Mychelle.
- On January 13, Kanye West married designer Bianca Censori.
- On January 16, Lil Tjay was arrested for gun possession in New York.
- On January 27, Drake's home was burglarized in Los Angeles.

=== February ===
- On February 5, Kendrick Lamar won both Best Rap Performance and Best Rap Song for "The Heart Part 5" at the 65th Annual Grammy Awards. Lamar also won the Best Rap Album for Mr. Morale & the Big Steppers, and Future won Best Melodic Rap Performance for "Wait for U", featuring Drake and Tems.
- On February 10, South African rapper AKA was fatally gunned down in Durban, KwaZulu-Natal.
- On February 12, Trugoy the Dove of De La Soul, died at the age of 54, with the cause of his death remaining undisclosed.
- On February 22, Eric Holder Jr. was sentenced to 60 years to life in prison for the murder of Nipsey Hussle in March 2019.
- On February 23, R. Kelly was sentenced in Chicago federal court to 20 years in prison for child pornography and other sexual crimes involving minors, with 19 years being concurrent to his previous 30-year term handed down in New York. Kelly will now serve 31 years in prison.

=== March ===
- On March 2, Lil Mosey was found not guilty of second-degree rape.
- On March 3, De La Soul's full discography became available on streaming services for the first time.
- On March 5, a stampede occurred at a GloRilla and Finesse2tymes concert in Rochester, New York, leaving three people dead and 7 people injured.
- On March 10, Jay Park won Artist of the Year at the Korean Hip-hop Awards.
- On March 11, South African rapper Costa Titch collapsed on stage while performing. He later died at the age of 27.
- On March 20, Michael Boatwright, Dedrick Williams, and Trayvon Newsome were convicted on all counts for the armed robbery and murder of XXXTentacion in June 2018.

=== April ===
- On April 6, Michael Boatwright, Dedrick Williams, and Trayvon Newsome were all formally sentenced to life in prison for the first-degree murder of XXXTentacion. On the same day, Coolio's cause of death was revealed as an overdose of fentanyl.
- On April 26, Pras, of the Fugees, was found guilty of conspiracy to defraud the US, witness tampering and acting as an unregistered agent of a foreign government, for his role in the 1Malaysia Development Berhad scandal (1MDB).
- On April 27, Kendrick Lamar's The Big Steppers Tour became the highest-grossing tour by a rapper as a headlining act in history, with $110.9 million from 929,000 tickets sold in 73 shows.

=== May ===
- On May 3, Missy Elliott, Rage Against the Machine, DJ Kool Herc, and Don Cornelius were inducted into the Rock and Roll Hall of Fame. On the same day, Boosie Badazz announced he was cancer free via Instagram.
- On May 4, Mozzy was released from prison.
- On May 5, Chris Brown got into an altercation with Usher at his birthday party in Las Vegas after an argument over Teyana Taylor.
- On May 17, Robert Allen was sentenced to 2 years in prison for the murder of XXXTentacion. On the same day, Sheff G, Sleepy Hallow, and 30 other alleged members of the 8 Trey Crips and 9 Ways gangs were indicted on charges of criminal conspiracy, murder, assault, kidnapping, reckless endangerment, and gun possession.
- On May 24, Fetty Wap was sentenced to 6 years in prison for drug trafficking.
- On May 25, Patrick Xavier Clarke was charged for the murder of Takeoff.
- On May 30, DaniLeigh was arrested for a DUI in Miami-Dade County, Florida.

=== June ===
- On June 7, Tupac Shakur was honored with a Hollywood Walk of Fame star. On the same day, Blueface was arrested in Las Vegas on robbery charges.
- On June 9, Jamarcus Johnson pleaded guilty and was charged for the murder of Young Dolph.
- On June 12, the trial for YNW Melly on charges of first-degree murder began.
- On June 16, Quando Rondo was arrested in Chatham County, Georgia, for drug conspiracy and gang activity.
- On June 18, Big Pokey collapsed and later died from cardiac arrest while performing at a bar in Beaumont, Texas.
- On June 21, XXL released their 2023 Freshman Class, including Finesse2tymes, Lola Brooke, Rob49, Fridayy, GloRilla, 2Rare, SleazyWorld Go, Central Cee, Real Boston Richey, Luh Tyler, TiaCorine, and DC the Don.
- On June 23, Jacquees was arrested for battery in Gwinnett County, Georgia.
- On June 26, Melle Mel, of Grandmaster Flash and the Furious Five, was arrested for domestic violence.
- On June 27, Casanova was sentenced to 15 years in prison. On the same day, Drake was awarded the key to Shelby County in Memphis.

=== July ===
- On July 2, a shooting at a nightclub in Wichita, Kansas, where Mozzy was performing at left 7 injured and 1 dead. Mozzy was briefly detained and released later that night.
- On July 5, MF Doom's cause of death was revealed as angioedema.
- On July 20, SpotemGottem was arrested for gun possession, burglary and fleeing a police officer. On the same day, G Herbo pled guilty to charges of conspiracy to commit wire fraud and making a false statement to a federal official.
- On July 22, the double murder trial for YNW Melly concluded. The trial ended with a hung jury, and the judge declared a mistrial.
- On July 24, Quavo was aboard a yacht in Miami, Florida when it was robbed by an armed crew.

=== August ===
- On August 2, Lizzo was sued for allegedly creating a hostile work environment by sexually harassing and weight shaming her dancers.
- On August 7, DJ Casper died of kidney and liver cancer at the age of 58.
- On August 8, Tory Lanez was sentenced to 10 years in prison for shooting Megan Thee Stallion.
- On August 10, 6ix9ine was arrested in Miami, Florida for failing to appear in court.
- August 11 represents the 50th anniversary of hip hop music and culture, and a concert honoring this milestone took place at Yankee Stadium. Run-DMC was the headline act, and a group of hip hop founders performed including Cindy Campbell and her brother DJ Kool Herc.
- On August 13, it was reported that Magoo had died at the age of 50.
- On August 15, it was reported that Young Capone had died at the age of 35 after he went missing in Chicago, Illinois.
- On August 19, Gunplay was arrested in Miami, Florida for aggravated battery with a deadly weapon, false imprisonment, and child abuse.
- On August 20, Blac Youngsta's brother was killed at a gas station in Memphis, Tennessee. On the same day, felony murder charges against Lul Tim for involvement in King Von's killing were dropped.
- On August 23, Blueface was stabbed at a gym in Los Angeles, California. On the same day, Polo G, alongside his brother Trench Baby, was arrested following a police raid at his house in Los Angeles, California.
- On August 24, Burmese artist Byu Har was sentenced to 20 years in prison for criticizing the military-controlled government's inability to provide electricity to Yangon - a harsher sentence than other celebrities found guilty of criticism.
- On August 29, August 08 died at the age of 31.

=== September ===
- On September 3, Chrisean Rock gave birth to her first child.
- On September 5, B.G. was released from prison in New Orleans, Louisiana.
- On September 9, the intersection of Ludlow Street and Rivington Street in New York City, featured on the cover of Paul's Boutique, was renamed to Beastie Boys Square.
- On September 15, Diddy received the key to New York City.
- On September 22, Krayzie Bone was hospitalized after coughing up blood in his sleep due to sarcoidosis.
- On September 29, Duane Davis was arrested in connection with the murder of Tupac Shakur in September 1996, in Las Vegas, Nevada.

=== October ===
- On October 3, the 2023 BET Hip Hop Awards were held. Kendrick Lamar won the most awards with four: Hip Hop Artist of the Year, Best Live Performer, Lyricist of the Year, and Video Director of the Year, alongside Dave Free. Drake and 21 Savage won Best Duo/Group and Hip Hop Album of the Year for Her Loss. Lil Uzi Vert won Best Hip Hop Video and Song of the Year for "Just Wanna Rock".
- On October 9, retrial for YNW Melly on charges of murder began.
- On October 17, Gucci Mane and T.I. squashed their beef after 20 years.
- On October 20, Yung Bleu was arrested for battery.
- On October 31, two suspects were charged in the murder of PnB Rock.

=== November ===
- On November 3, a section of MacArthur Boulevard in Oakland, California, where Tupac Shakur had previously lived, was renamed to Tupac Shakur Way.
- On November 7, C-Knight of The Dove Shack died of a stroke at the age of 52.
- On November 8, Ralo was released from prison.
- On November 17, Diddy's former partner Cassie Ventura filed a lawsuit against him accusing him of rape, sex trafficking, and physical abuse.
- On November 23, Towne Center Drive in Compton, California was renamed to Eazy Street in honor of Eazy-E.
- On November 27, the trial for Young Thug on RICO charges began.

=== December ===
- On December 6, Sauce Walka was arrested for evading arrest In Harris County, Texas.
- On December 7, Kodak Black was arrested for possession of cocaine in Plantation, Florida.
- On December 8, Quando Rondo was arrested on federal drug charges in Savannah, Georgia.
- On December 9, 2 Chainz was hospitalized with neck injuries after his car was struck by a drunk driver.
- On December 10, Rich the Kid was arrested for trespassing a police investigation of a bomb threat in Miami Beach, Florida.

== Released albums ==
=== January ===
Day	Artist(s)	Album	Record label(s)	Entering chart position
1	KXNG Crooked	Dear California	COB, Hitmaker Distribution	
5	Dusty Locane & Kajun Waters	-95 Degrees	95MM, Empire	
6	French Montana & DJ Drama	Coke Boys 6	Coke Boys, Epic Records	Debuted at No. 11 on the Billboard 200
6	Real Boston Richey	Public Housing, Pt. 2	Open Shift Distribution	Debuted at No. 38 on the Billboard 200
6	YoungBoy Never Broke Again	I Rest My Case	Never Broke Again, Motown Records	Debuted at No. 9 on the Billboard 200
6	Zaytoven	Only One	Zaytoven Global LLC	
9	03 Greedo & Mike Free	Free 03	Alamo Records, Sony Music Entertainment	
13	21 Lil Harold	After the Curse	Slaughter Gang Entertainment, Epic Records	
13	BabyTron	Bin Reaper 3: New Testament	The Hip Hop Lab, Empire	Debuted at No. 100 on the Billboard 200
13	Clavish	Rap Game Awful	Polydor, Universal Music UK	Debuted at No. 4 on the UK Albums Chart
13	Declaime & Madlib	In the Beginning (Vol. 3)	SomeOthaShip Connect, Fat Beats	
13	Sematary	Butcher House	Haunted Mound	
13	Skyzoo & The Other Guys	The Mind of a Saint	First Generation Rich, HiPNOTT Records	
13	Teejayx6	Fraudulent	TF Entertainment	
20	Autumn!	##B4GC3 ##B4GC3	Self-released	
20	Boldy James & RichGains	Indiana Jones	Self-released	
20	Chiddy Bang	Lunch	Adventure Records	
20	Gloss Up	Before the Gloss Up	Quality Control Music	
20	Ice Spice	Like..?	10K Projects, Capitol Records	Debuted at No. 37 on the Billboard 200
20	Oddisee	To What End	Outer Note Label	
20	Rose Villain	Radio Gotham	Sony Music Italia, Columbia	
20	Trippie Redd	Mansion Musik	10K Projects, Universal Music Group	Debuted at No. 3 on the Billboard 200
27	BiC Fizzle	Clark Street Baby	1017 Records, Atlantic Records	
27	Don Trip	Gotham City	MRVL Recording Group, Connect Music	
27	King Vision Ultra	Shook World	PTP	
27	Lil Yachty	Let's Start Here	Concrete Records, Quality Control, Motown Records	Debuted at No. 9 on the Billboard 200
27	Reuben Vincent	Love is War	Jamla Records, Roc Nation	
27	Styles P	Penultimate: A Calm Wolf Is Still a Wolf	Empire Distribution	
27	Summrs	Stuck in My Ways	Virgin Records, Universal Music Group	
27	tana	GAULTIER	Galactic Records, Interscope Records	
31	Big Boogie	Definition of Big Dude	CMG	

=== February ===
Day	Artist(s)	Album	Record label(s)	Entering chart position
1	Epik High	Strawberry	OURS, Genie Music	Debuted at No. 33 on the Circle Album Chart
1	Kevin Gates	The Luca Brasi Story (A Decade of Brasi)	Bread Winners' Association, Atlantic Records	
3	2KBABY	Scared 2 Love	Warner Records	
3	Ace Hood	Body Bag Vol. 6	Hood Nation, Empire	
3	JayDaYoungan	Forever 23 2x	DNF Partners, Atlantic Records	Debuted at No. 188 on the Billboard 200
10	BigXthaPlug	Amar	UnitedMasters	Debuted at No. 181 on the Billboard 200
10	Dusty Locane	From da Flu with Luv	95MM, Empire	
10	Enchanting	Luv Scarred / No Luv (Deluxe)	1017 Records, Atlantic Records	
10	Fendi P & Cheeze Beatz	LS3	Jet Life Recordings, Atlantic Records, Empire	
10	J.I the Prince of N.Y	One Way or Another	G*Starr Entertainment	
10	Kash Doll & DJ Drama	Back on Dexter: A Gangsta Grillz Mixtape	Kash Doll Enterprises, MNRK Records	
10	Lance Skiiiwalker	Audiodidactic	Top Dawg Entertainment	
10	Shy Glizzy	Flowers	Glizzy Gang, 300 Entertainment	
10	Smokepurpp	Anti	Alamo Records, Sony Music Entertainment	
11	Horseshoe Gang	Deme Lovewin Kenny	COB LLC	
14	Tony Yayo	The Loyal	Self-released	
14	YN Jay	Coming 2 Coochie Land	YN Records	
15	Slim Thug	Where Dreams Are Made	SoSouth	
17	Big Scarr	The Secret Weapon	1017 Records, Atlantic Records	Debuted at No. 43 on the Billboard 200
17	Celestaphone	Paper Cut from the Obit	Drumhex	
17	D. Savage	Mafia Musik	D Savage Enterprise, Empire	
17	Jay Critch	Jugg Season	Talk Money Entertainment, Empire	
17	Kxllswxtch	The Walls Have Eyes	KILL!, Empire	
17	MadeinTYO	NEO TYO	Private Club Records, Commission Music	
17	Nappy Nina	Mourning Due	LucidHaus	
17	Oh No	Good Vibes	Stones Throw	
17	Skrillex	Quest for Fire	OWSLA, Atlantic Records	Debuted at No. 51 on the Billboard 200
17	Violent J	Bloody Sunday	Psychopathic Records	
17	Wesley Joseph	GLOW	Secretly Canadian, EEVILTWINN	
18	Skrillex	Don't Get Too Close	OWSLA, Atlantic Records	
22	Maxo	Even God Has a Sense of Humor	Def Jam Recordings	
24	AKA	Mass Country	Sony Music Entertainment Africa	
24	Algiers	Shook	Matador Records	
24	ALLBLACK	Born to Score	Play Runners Association, Empire	
24	Asian Doll	Let's Do a Drill 2	Doll Gang Records	
24	BabyTron	Out on Bond	The Hip Hop Lab, Empire	
24	Blac Youngsta	Bank Appointment	Heavy Camp, Create Music Group	
24	Canibus & Johnny Slash	Self Licking Ice Cream Cone	Holy Toledo Productions, Revel Distro	
24	Cappadonna & Shaka Amazulu The 7th	African Killa Beez	Black Stone of Mecca	
24	Don Toliver	Love Sick	Cactus Jack Records, Atlantic Records	Debuted at No. 8 on the Billboard 200
24	Fredo Bang	Ape Talk	Se Lavi, Def Jam Records	
24	Hell Razah & RoadsArt	Renaissance Art	RoadsArt Records	
24	Key Glock	Glockoma 2	Paper Route Empire, Empire	Debuted at No. 13 on the Billboard 200
24	KXNG Crooked & Joell Ortiz	JFKLAX	Hitmaker Distribution	
24	Lecrae	Church Clothes 4: Dry Clean Only	Reach Records	
24	Logic	College Park	Three Oh One Productions	Debuted at No. 21 on the Billboard 200
24	Nina Chuba	Glas	Jive Germany, Sony Music	
24	Radamiz	Gnashing, Teeth	Big Enough Home	
24	Russ Millions	One of a Kind	Dream Like Records	
24	Rv	Inconspicuous	Self-released	
24	Sada Baby	Shonuff	Hitmaker Music Group, Blac Noize!	
24	$uicideboy$ & Shakewell	Shameless $uicide	G*59 Records	Debuted at No. 50 on the Billboard 200
24	Tha God Fahim	Iron Bull	Nature Sound	
24	Watsky	Intention	Symmetry 3.3 Music	
24	Xanman	Snake Me	Xanmann	
24	Yeat	Afterlyfe	Field Trip, Geffen Records	Debuted at No. 4 on the Billboard 200
27	Rome Streetz & Big Ghost Ltd	Wasn't Built in a Day	Big Ghost Ltd. Music	
28	Young Nudy	Gumbo	RCA Records	Debuted at No. 135 on the Billboard 200

=== March ===
Day	Artist(s)	Album	Record label(s)	Entering chart position
2	9th Wonder	Zion VIII	Jamla Records	
3	Che Noir & Big Ghost	Noir or Never	Poetic Movement	
3	Dreamville	Creed III: The Soundtrack	Dreamville, Interscope Records	Debuted at No. 127 on the Billboard 200
3	Finesse2tymes	90 Days Later	Bread Gang, Atlantic Records	
3	Gawne	Seven	GAWNE LLC	
3	Lil' Flip	333	GT Digital, Clover G	
3	Mach-Hommy & Tha God Fahim	Notorious Dump Legends: Volume 2	Self-released	
3	Macklemore	Ben	Bendo LLC	Debuted at No. 18 on the Billboard 200
3	Real Boston Richey	Trapping & Finessing	Open Shift Distribution	
3	Slowthai	Ugly	Method Records, Interscope	Debuted at No. 2 on the UK Albums Chart
3	Ufo361	Love My Life	Stay High, Groove Attack	
3	Young Noble & Deuce Deuce	Purpose	Concrete Enterprise	
6	Talib Kweli & Madlib	Liberation 2	Self-released	
7	iayze	Reverence	Simple Stupid Records, Geffen Records	
10	Bankrol Hayden	29	Atlantic Records	
10	Bones & Greaf	TheWitch&TheWizard	TeamSESH, Empire	
10	Conway the Machine & Jae Skeese	Pain Provided Profit	Drumwork, Empire	
10	G Perico & DJ Drama	Hot Shot	Perico's Innerprize LLC, Empire	
10	Jim Jones & Hitmaka	Back in My Prime	Vamplife, Empire	
10	Murs	speak n spell	Mid90s	
10	Musiq Soulchild & Hit-Boy	Victims & Villains	SoulStar Music Company	
10	Pouya	Gator	All But 6	
10	RXKNephew	Till I'm Dead	New Breed Trapper	
10	Zaytoven	Street Credentials	Famillar Territory, MNRK Records	
11	Fly Anakin	stop tryna hack my face book	Self-released	
12	RXKNephew	Not Fin Be on No Streaming Services Vol. 1.	AintNobodyCool	
13	Kai	Rover	SM Entertainment	Debuted at No. 1 on the Circle Album Chart
15	Yung Mal	Iceburg Where U Been	Alamo Records, Sony Music	
16	Code Kunst	Remember Archive	AOMG	Debuted at No. 19 on the Circle Album Chart
16	Upchurch	Pioneer	Mud to Gold Entertainment	
17	Eladio Carrión	3men2 Kbrn	Rimas	Debuted at No. 16 on the Billboard 200
17	EST Gee	Mad	Warlike, CMG, Interscope Records	Debuted at No. 25 on the Billboard 200
17	Lil Keed	Keed Talk to 'Em 2	YSL, 300, Atlantic	
17	Lil Pump	Lil Pump 2	Self-released	
17	Money Man	Red Eye	Black Circle, Empire	Debuted at No. 93 on the Billboard 200
17	Quin NFN	Never on Time	NFN Entertainment, Empire	
17	Rich Amiri	Evolution	Universal Music Group	
17	T-Pain	On Top of the Covers	Nappy Boy, Empire	
22	Daz Dillinger & Lil Eazy-E	The Legacy	Dogg Pound Records, Rich & Ruthless Records	
23	Myke Towers	La Vida es Una	Warner Records	Debuted at No. 173 on the Billboard 200
23	Navy Blue	Ways of Knowing	Def Jam, Freedom Sounds	
23	Rylo Rodriguez	Sorry Four the Delay	Self-released	
24	03 Greedo	Halfway There	Alamo Records	
24	6lack	Since I Have a Lover	Love Renaissance, Interscope Records	Debuted at No. 24 on the Billboard 200
24	Hit-Boy	Surf or Drown	Surf Club	
24	IceColdBishop	Generational Curse	Ice Cold Entertainment, Epic Records, Sony Music Entertainment	
24	Jae Skeese	Abolished Uncertainties	Drumwork, Empire	
24	Jasiah	3	Atlantic Records	
24	Jimin	Face	Big Hit Music	Debuted at No. 1 on the Circle Album Chart; Debuted at No. 2 on the Billboard 200
24	JPEGMafia & Danny Brown	Scaring the Hoes	Warp Records	Debuted at No. 84 on the Billboard 200
24	Kool Keith & Real Bad Man	Serpent	Real Bad Man Records	
24	Kota the Friend & Statik Selektah	To See a Sunset	Venice Music	
24	Quando Rondo	Recovery	Never Broke Again, Atlantic Records	
24	TisaKorean	Let Me Update My Status	Jazzzy	
28	Zelooperz	Microphone Fiend	Self-released	
31	Autumn!	Golden Child, Chapter 3	Self-released	
31	B. Cool-Aid	Leather Blvd	Lex Records	
31	Chlöe	In Pieces	Parkwood Entertainment, Columbia Records	Debuted at No. 119 on the Billboard 200
31	DJ Drama	I'm Really Like That	Generation Now, Atlantic Records	Debuted at No. 67 on the Billboard 200
31	Juicy J	Mental Trillness	Trippy Music LLC	
31	Larry June & The Alchemist	The Great Escape	The Freeminded, ALC Records, Empire	Debuted at No. 32 on the Billboard 200
31	Lil Wayne	I Am Music	Young Money Records, Republic Records	Debuted at No. 25 on the Billboard 200
31	Luh Tyler	My Vision	Motion Music, Atlantic Records	
31	Madame	L'amore	Sugar Music	
31	Matt Ox	Ai.Ox	OX	
31	Powfu	tell me your feelings and i won't tell you mine pt. 2	Columbia Records	
31	Ric Wilson, Chromeo & A-Trak	Clusterfunk	Free Disco, Empire	
31	Royce da 5'9"	The Heaven Experience EP	Heaven Studios, LLC	
31	Tyler, the Creator	Call Me If You Get Lost: The Estate Sale	Columbia Records	

=== April ===
Day	Artist(s)	Album	Record label(s)	Entering chart position
4	Curren$y & Jermaine Dupri	For Motivational Use Only, Vol. 1	Jet Life Recordings, So So Def Recordings	
5	Fly Anakin & Foisey	Skinemaxxx (Side A)	Lex Records	
6	Blac Youngsta	Blac Sheep	Heavy Camp, Create Music Group	
6	Gucci Mane	1017 Up Next	1017 Records, Atlantic Records	
7	Kenny Muney	Blue Muney	Paper Route Empire, Empire	
7	Meyhem Lauren, Madlib & DJ Muggs	Champagne for Breakfast	Soul Assassins	
7	Mozzy	Kollect Kall	CMG, Interscope Records	
7	NF	Hope	NF Real Music, Capitol Records	Debuted at No. 2 on the Billboard 200
7	Nym Lo & Statik Selektah	From The Horse's Mouth	MNRK Records, Surface Noise Records	
7	Planet Giza	Ready When You Are	Quiet Note	
7	Rae Sremmurd	Sremm 4 Life	EarDrummers, Interscope Records	Debuted at No. 28 on the Billboard 200
7	Rittz	MellowLOvation Music	CNT Records	
7	Slump6s	Forgive Never Forget	Field Trip, Republic Records	
7	Tyler, the Creator	Wolf + Instrumentals	Columbia Records	
14	Avelino	God Save the Streets	More Music Records, OddChild Music	Debuted at No. 12 on the UK Albums Chart
14	Black Thought & El Michels Affair	Glorious Game	Big Crown Records	
14	BONES & Eddy Baker	Jones Peak	TeamSESH, Empire	
14	Dinner Party	Enigmatic Society	Sounds of Crenshaw, Empire	
14	French the Kid	No Signal	Drop Out UK	Debuted at No. 55 on the UK Albums Chart
14	Grafh & 38 Spesh	Art of Words	TCF Music Group	
14	Kwengface	The Memoir	Self-released	
14	NLE Choppa	Cottonwood 2	Warner Records	Debuted at No. 21 on the Billboard 200
14	Pi'erre Bourne	Grails	SossHouse, Interscope Records	
14	Prof	Horse	Stophouse Music Group	Debuted at No. 111 on the Billboard 200
14	Troy Ave	Dear Hater I Won	BSB Records	
14	Yung Bleu	Love Scars II	Moon Boy University, Empire	Debuted at No. 38 on the Billboard 200
19	Redveil	Playing w/ Fire	Self-released	
20	Krayzie Bone	Quickfix: Level 3: Level Up	The Life Apparel	
20	Matt Ox & Surf Gang	OXygen	Surf Gang Records	
21	Agust D	D-Day	Big Hit	Debuted at No. 1 on the Circle Album Chart; Debuted at No. 2 on the Billboard 200
21	Hotboy Wes	Left For Dead, Vol. 1	1017 Records, Atlantic Records	
21	Iann Dior	Leave Me Where You Found Me	Internet Money Records, 10K Projects	
21	Lloyd Banks	The Course of the Inevitable III: Pieces of My Pain	Money by Any Means, Empire	
21	M-Dot	egO anD The eneMy 2: A Dissolute Paradise	Self-released	
21	Peezy	Ghetto	#Boyz Entertainment, Empire	
21	Post Malone	The Diamond Collection	Republic Records	Debuted at No. 16 on the Billboard 200
21	Songer	SKALA	Hard Reality	Debuted at No. 30 on the UK Albums Chart
21	Swizz Beatz	Hip Hop 50, Vol. 2	Mass Appeal Records, Def Jam Recordings	
21	YoungBoy Never Broke Again	Don't Try This at Home	Motown Records	Debuted at No. 5 on the Billboard 200
21	Zombie Juice	Love Without Conditions	Terp World	
25	Taeyang	Down to Earth	The Black Label, Interscope Records	Debuted at No. 10 on the Circle Album Chart
26	Jim Legxacy	Homeless N*gga Pop Music	(!)	
28	BlueBucksClan & Drakeo the Ruler	Legendary	UMG Recordings	
28	G Herbo	Strictly 4 My Fans 2	Machine Entertainment Group, 150 Dream Team	Debuted at No. 124 on the Billboard 200
28	Homixide Gang	Snot or Not	Opium, Interscope Records	
28	Ill Bill	Billy	Uncle Howie Records, Fat Beats	
28	Jack Harlow	Jackman	Generation Now, Atlantic	Debuted at No. 8 on the Billboard 200
28	KAMAUU	LACUNA in The House Of Mirrors	Atlantic Recording Corporation	
28	Nines	Crop Circle 2	Warner Records	Debuted at No. 2 on the UK Albums Chart
28	Rowdy Rebel & Fetty Luciano	Splash Brothers	Self-released	
28	Shordie Shordie	A Life for Two	Warner Records	
28	Summrs	Ghost	Self-released	
28	Tee Grizzley & Skilla Baby	Controversy	Grizzley Gang, 300 Entertainment	
28	Tony Shhnow	Love Streak	Self-released	
28	YUNGMORPHEUS	From Whence It Came	Lex Records	
29	Mike Dean	4:23	MWA Music	

=== May ===
Day	Artist(s)	Album	Record label(s)	Entering chart position
4	iKon	Take Off	143	Debuted at No. 10 on the Circle Album Chart
5	Armani White	Road to Casablanco	Legendbound, Def Jam Recordings	
5	Atmosphere	So Many Other Realities Exist Simultaneously	Rhymesayers	
5	Berner	Arrogance Is Ignorance (One Shot Kill)	Empire	
5	Billy Woods & Kenny Segal	Maps	Backwoodz Studioz	
5	Conway the Machine	Won't He Do It	Drumwork, Empire	
5	DaBaby	Call Da Fireman	South Coast Music Group, Interscope Records	
5	DC the Don	FUNERAL	Rostrum Records	
5	Denzel Curry	Live at Electric Lady	PH Recordings, Loma Vista	
5	Destroy Lonely	If Looks Could Kill	Opium, Interscope Records	Debuted at No. 18 on the Billboard 200
5	IDK	F65	Clue No Clue LLC, Warner Records	
5	JELEEL!	REAL RAW!	Jeleel Yeah LLC, 10K Projects	
5	Jidenna	ME YOU & GOD	Wondaland Records, Magic Chief Productions	
5	MC Eiht	Lessons 2	Blue Stamp Records	
5	OhGeesy	Geezyworld 2	Atlantic Records	
5	$uicideboy$	YIN YANG TAPES: Spring Season (1989-1990)	G*59 Records	
5	Tunde	First Lap	Self-released	Debuted at No. 4 on the UK Albums Chart
10	Deante' Hitchcock	ONCE UPON A TIME	ByStorm Entertainment, RCA Records	
10	Nebu Kiniza	Bittersweet Memories	Self-released	
10	Radamiz & Thelonious Martin	2409 West Slauson	Big Enough Home	
12	Chuck Strangers	The Boys & Girls	Lex Records	
12	DD Osama	Here 2 Stay	Alamo Records, Sony Music Entertainment	
12	Potter Payper	Real Back in Style	0207 Def Jam	Debuted at No. 2 on the UK Albums Chart
12	Russ	Chomp 2.5	DIEMON Records	
12	Soulja Boy	Soulja Season	SODMG Records	
12	$uicideboy$	YIN YANG TAPES: Summer Season (1989-1990)	G*59 Records	
12	YoungBoy Never Broke Again	Richest Opp	Never Broke Again, Motown Records	Debuted at No. 4 on the Billboard 200
16	Wiki	Papiseed Street Vol. 1	Self-released	
18	6ix	6ixtape	TuneCore	
19	B-Lovee	Sorry 4 The Wait...	Columbia Records	
19	Belly	Mumble Rap 2	XO, Roc Nation Records	
19	ELWD	Monochrome	Bad Taste Records	
19	Estee Nack	Nacksaw Jim Duggan	Griselda Records	
19	Juice WRLD	Goodbye & Good Riddance (5 Year Anniversary Edition)	Grade A, Interscope Records	
19	Kaytraminé (Kaytranada & Aminé)	Kaytraminé	CLBN	Debuted at No. 92 on the Billboard 200
19	Steel Banglez	The Playlist	Gifted Music	Debuted at No. 29 on the UK Albums Chart
19	$uicideboy$	YIN YANG TAPES: Fall Season (1989-1990)	G*59 Records	
19	Summer Walker	CLEAR 2: SOFT LIFE	LVRN, Interscope Records	Debuted at No. 26 on the Billboard 200
19	Various Artists	FAST X (Original Motion Picture Soundtrack)	Universal Records	Debuted at No. 79 on the Billboard 200
21	Duwap Kaine	Duwap So Based	Self-released	
22	Enhypen	Dark Blood	Belift Lab	Debuted at No. 1 on the Circle Album Chart; Debuted at No. 4 on the Billboard 200
23	Devito	Plava krv	IDJTunes	
26	Cochise	NO ONE'S NICE TO ME	Columbia Records, Sony Music Entertainment	
26	Guvna B	The Village Is on Fire	Allo Mate Records	
26	Jay Worthy & Roc Marciano	Nothing Bigger Than the Program	SRFSCHL	
26	Kassa Overall	Animals	Warp Records	
26	KayCyy	TW2052	BuVision, Columbia Records	
26	Kodak Black	Pistolz & Pearlz	Atlantic Records	Debuted at No. 19 on the Billboard 200
26	Lil Durk	Almost Healed	Alamo Records, Only The Family	Debuted at No. 3 on the Billboard 200
26	Monaleo	Where The Flowers Don't Die	stomp grounds	
26	Nascar Aloe	HEY ASSHOLE!	Epitaph Records	
26	Peter Fox	Love Songs	Warner	
26	Rory	I Thought It'd Be Different	Avant Garden	
26	Shaggy 2 Dope	Professor Shaggs and the Quest for the Ultimate Groove	Psychopathic Records	
26	$uicideboy$	YIN YANG TAPES: Winter Season (1989-1990)	G*59 Records	
29	Nicholas Britell	Succession: Season 4 (HBO Original Series Soundtrack)	Lake George Music Group	
30	Na-Kel Smith	Free Pops Fr	A Dream No Longer Deferred Records	
31	CJ Fly	Healing from Our Wounds	Pro Era Records	
31	Fivio Foreign	Without Warning	Foreign Slide Records	

=== June ===
Day	Artist(s)	Album	Record label(s)	Entering chart position
1	B.I	To Die For	131	Debuted at No. 14 on the Circle Album Chart
2	McKinley Dixon	Beloved! Paradise! Jazz!?	City Slang	
2	Metro Boomin	Spider-Man: Across the Spider-Verse (Soundtrack from and Inspired by the Motion Picture)	Boominati Worldwide, Republic Records	Debuted at No. 7 on the Billboard 200
2	Moneybagg Yo	Hard to Love	CMG, Interscope Records	Debuted at No. 10 on the Billboard 200
2	Speakers Corner Quartet	Further Out Than the Edge	OTIH	
2	Stray Kids	5-Star	JYP Entertainment, Republic Records	Debuted at No. 1 on the Circle Album Chart; Debuted at No. 1 on the Billboard 200
2	Toosii	Naujour	SCMG, Capitol Records	Debuted at No. 19 on the Billboard 200
2	X-Raided	A Prayer in Hell	Strange Music, Bloc Star Evolution, INgrooves	
4	Dave & Central Cee	Split Decision	Neighbourhood, Live Yours	
5	Taeyong	Shalala	SM Entertainment, Kakao Entertainment	Debuted at No. 2 on the Circle Album Chart
6	BabyTron	6	The Hip Hop Lab, Empire	
6	Kenny Mason	6	RCA Records	
9	7xvethegenius & DJ Green Lantern	The Genius Tape	Drumwork, Empire	
9	Bizarre & Foul Mouth	HGG2	Readhead, Middle Finger Music	
9	Boldy James & ChanHays	Prisoner of Circumstance	Droppin Science Productions	
9	Doe Boy	Beezy	Freebandz, Epic Records	
9	Fat Trel	Nightmare on E Street 2	Asylum Records	
9	Rah Swish	9 Shots in the Ruger	20nyne Entertainment, Empire	
9	Rob49	4GOD II	Rebel, Geffen Records	
9	Sexyy Red	Hood Hottest Princess	Open Shift, Gamma	Debuted at No. 193 on the Billboard 200
9	Statik Selektah	Round Trip	Mass Appeal	
9	Youngs Teflon & Tiny Boost	Purple Hearts	The Sharks	Debuted at No. 38 on the UK Albums Chart
10	Mr. Muthafuckin' eXquire & Madlib	I'm Alive	Self-released	
13	Radamiz	3 Days Outside Your Body	Big Enough Home	
14	SoFaygo	Go+	Cactus Jack Records	
14	Wiz Khalifa	See Ya	Taylor Gang Entertainment	
16	6ix9ine	Leyenda Viva	La Corporación	
16	Certified Trapper	Trapper of the Year	Signal Records, Columbia Records	
16	Gunna	a Gift & a Curse	YSL Records, 300 Entertainment	Debuted at No. 3 on the Billboard 200
16	Killer Mike	MICHAEL	VLNS, Loma Vista	Debuted at No. 58 on the Billboard 200
16	Kool Keith	Black Elvis 2	Mello Music Group	
16	Mike Dimes	TEXAS BOY	Encore Recordings	
21	Sara Jo	Bez kontrole	Bassivity Digital	
22	Octavian	22	SexAm Club	
22	Peso Pluma	Génesis	Double P Records	Debuted at No. 3 on the Billboard 200
23	Austin Mahone	A Lone Star Story	A.M. Music	
23	Baby Money	Young Nigga Old Soul 2	Quality Control Music	
23	Big Freedia	Central City	Queen Diva Music	
23	Coi Leray	COI	Uptown Records	Debuted at No. 102 on the Billboard 200
23	Curtis Waters	Bad Son	Self-released	
23	Danny Towers & DJ Scheme	Safe House	TC Music, Empire	
23	E.D.I. Mean	OG 3: La Bella Vita	O4L Digital	
23	E.D.I. Mean	The Hope Dealer, Pt. 3	O4L Digital	
23	I.M	Overdrive	Sony Music Korea	Debuted at No. 6 on the Circle Album Chart
23	Kerser	A Gift & a Kers	ABK, Warner Music Australia	Debuted at No. 1 on the ARIA Albums Chart
23	Lil Poppa	Half Man Half Vamp	Rule #1, Interscope Records	
23	Mac Miller	Watching Movies with the Sound Off (10th Anniversary)	Rostrum Records	
23	Nafe Smallz	High Profile	Self-released	Debuted at No. 98 on the UK Albums Chart
23	TeeFlii & Dom Kennedy	I Love Stocker	OPM	
23	Theophilus London	TL	Purple Money	
23	UnoTheActivist	Deadication 3	Too Lost LLC	
23	Young Thug	Business Is Business	YSL Records, 300 Entertainment, Atlantic Records	Debuted at No. 2 on the Billboard 200
26	Shinee	Hard	SM	Debuted at No. 2 on the Circle Album Chart
27	Veeze	Ganger	Navy Wavy LLC	Debuted at No. 152 on the Billboard 200
29	Tainy	Data	Neon16	Debuted at No. 11 on the Billboard 200
30	Bandokay	M.A.R.K	No Request, Polydor Records	
30	Curren$y & Harry Fraud	VICES	Jet Life Recordings	
30	Kota the Friend	Protea	Fltbys	
30	Lil Uzi Vert	Pink Tape	Generation Now, Atlantic Records	Debuted at No. 1 on the Billboard 200
30	Loski	See You At The Gates	Self-released	
30	Natanael Cano	Nata Montana	Warner Music, Rancho Humilde	Debuted at No. 35 on the Billboard 200
30	P Money	Money Over Everyone 4	Self-released	
30	Rylo Rodriguez	Been One	4PF, Virgin Music	Debuted at No. 10 on the Billboard 200
30	The Alchemist	Flying High	ALC Records, Empire	
30	Tobi Lou & Farada	'Decent	Free Agency	

=== July ===
Day	Artist(s)	Album	Record label(s)	Entering chart position
5	Kiss of Life	Kiss of Life	S2 Entertainment	Debuted at No. 18 on the Circle Album Chart
5	Robb Bank$	I Dnt txt back, I Dnt call	430 ENT DEATHLESS	
7	A$AP Twelvyy	Kid$ Gotta Eat	Two twelve technologies	
7	A$AP TyY	1840 LEX	AWAL Recordings	
7	Conway the Machine	Drumwork: The Album	Drumwork, Empire	
7	D-Block Europe	DBE World	Self-released	Debuted at No. 6 on the UK Albums Chart
7	Dominic Fike	Sunburn	Sandy Boys, Columbia Records	Debuted at No. 30 on the Billboard 200
7	Lucki	S*X M*NEY DR*GS	Empire	Debuted at No. 15 on the Billboard 200
7	Never Broke Again	Green Flag Activity, Vol. 2	Never Broke Again, Motown Records	
7	Speaker Bullies (Supastition & Praise)	Art Of Disrespect	Soulspazm Records	
7	The Musalini & 9th Wonder	Don & Eye 2	Jamla Records, Empire	
7	Yhung T.O.	Eternal Trauma	R3al Boii Records	
8	TruCarr & TeeFlii	TruFlii	Self-released	
9	Eem Triplin	Still Pretty	Self-released	
14	Dave East	Fortune Favors the Bold	Def Jam Recordings, Mass Appeal Records	
14	DDG	Maybe It's Me...	DDG Entertainment, Epic Records	
14	Haviah Mighty	Crying Crystals	Mighty Gang	
14	J Hus	Beautiful and Brutal Yard	Black Butter Records	Debuted at No. 1 on the UK Albums Chart
14	King Von	Grandson	Empire, Only the Family	Debuted at No. 14 on the Billboard 200
14	Lil Tjay	222	Columbia Records	Debuted at No. 24 on the Billboard 200
14	Masiwei & Asen	狗咬狗 (Dog Bite Dog)	A Few Good Kids Records, STK Studio	
14	Substantial	Adultish	Self-released	
17	Duwap Kaine	Darkest Days	Self-released	
17	NCT Dream	ISTJ	SM Entertainment, Kakao Entertainment	Debuted at No. 1 on the Circle Album Chart; Debuted at No. 28 on the Billboard 200
17	YGTUT	I'm Back	TheHouse	
19	Black Milk	Everybody Good?	Computer Ugly, Mass Appeal Records	
20	Big Boss Vette	Resilience	Amigo Records, Beatstaz, Republic Records, UMG Recordings	
20	Cypress Hill	Black Sunday (Deluxe)	Columbia Records	
21	Babyface Ray	Summer's Mine	Wavy Gang, Empire	Debuted at No. 92 on the Billboard 200
21	Dizzee Rascal	Boy in da Corner (20th Anniversary Edition)	XL Recordings	
21	FRVRFRIDAY	Cruise Control	Self-released	
21	Nas	Magic 2	Mass Appeal Records	Debuted at No. 52 on the Billboard 200
21	Paris Texas	MID AIR	Self-released	
21	Scarlxrd	Made In Hell	Lxrd Records, Warner Records	
21	Valee & Harry Fraud	Virtuoso	SRFSCHL, Fake Shore Drive	
21	Various Artists	They Cloned Tyrone (soundtrack)	Republic Records	
24	Tony Yayo	134 Tape	Self-released	
27	Thelonious Martin	Season 1. Episode 7.	Self-released	
28	Adekunle Gold	Tequila Ever After	Def Jam Recordings, UMG Recordings	
28	AKTHESAVIOR	Tracing Patterns	Boom.Records	
28	B-Legit	Throwblock Music II: 88' D-Boi	Sick Wid It, Block Movement, Empire	
28	BIA	Really Her	Epic Records, Sony Music Entertainment	
28	Chika	Samson: The Album	Warner Records	
28	Fly Anakin & Foisey	Skinemaxxx (Side B)	Lex Records	
28	ICYTWAT	Final Boss	Siddhi	
28	iLoveMakonnen	Pink Nails	Self-released	
28	KenTheMan	Back To 304'n	Roc Nation	
28	Post Malone	Austin	Republic, Mercury	Debuted at No. 2 on the Billboard 200
28	Roy Woods	Mixed Emotions	OVO Sound	
28	Soulja Boy	Soulja World 3	Self-released	
28	Tech N9ne	BLISS	Strange Music, INgrooves	
28	That Mexican OT	Lonestar Luchador	Good Money Global	Debuted at No. 106 on the Billboard 200
28	Travis Scott	Utopia	Cactus Jack Records, Epic Records	Debuted at No. 1 on the Billboard 200
28	YN Jay	Been Havin	YN Records	
29	1017 ALYX 9SM	Compilation V1	Alamo Records, Sony Music Entertainment	

=== August ===
Day	Artist(s)	Album	Record label(s)	Entering chart position
2	Marlon Craft	HOMECOURT ADVANTAGE, Vol. 2	HOMECOURT	
4	BLP Kosher	Bars Mitzvah	Dreidel Gang, Encore Recording	
4	Chris Travis	WAVs	Water Boyz Ent.	
4	Homeboy Sandman	Rich	Dirty Looks	
4	N-Dubz	Timeless	LRC Live Limited, EMI	Debuted at No. 6 on the UK Albums Chart
4	Tyla Yaweh	Heart Full of Rage 2	London Ent, Epic Records	
4	Yo Gotti & DJ Drama	I Showed U So	Inevitable II Records, CMG	Debuted at No. 39 on the Billboard 200
6	Fleeky Bang	The Predator	Dirty Play Records, Kakao Entertainment	
9	Lil B	B-Unit	Basedworld Records	
10	Gloria Groove	Lady Leste (Ao Vivo)	SB Music	
10	Joey Purp	Heavy Heart Vol. 1	LOUDSOUND, 4NRECORDS	
11	Ez Mil	DU4LI7Y: REDUX	FFP Records, Virgin Music, Shady, Aftermath	
11	Fredo	Unfinished Business	PG Records	Debuted at No. 9 on the UK Albums Chart
11	G Perico	7 Figures Later	Perico's Innerprize, Empire	
11	Gloss Up	Shades of Gloss	Quality Control Music	
11	Joell Ortiz & L'Orange	Signature	Mello Music Group	
11	K.A.A.N. & Mike Summers	The Death of a Rapper	K.A.A.N. Life Music, Squarian Entertainment	
11	Noname	Sundial	AWAL	
11	Reason	Porches	Top Dawg Entertainment	
11	Sha Ek, Bandmanrill & MCVERTT	Jiggy In Jersey	Defiant Records, Warner Records	
11	Trippie Redd	A Love Letter to You 5	1400 Entertainment, 10K Projects	Debuted at No. 13 on the Billboard 200
13	Jelena Karleuša	Alpha	JK Entertainment, Virgin Music	
15	Boosie Badazz	Goin Thru Some Thangs	Bad Azz Music Syndicate	
16	Duwap Kaine	You Influenced Me	Self-released	
16	Killah Priest	Vedic Vape Room	Proverbs Records	
18	Blanco	Rebourne	Believe UK	
18	Dame D.O.L.L.A.	Don D.O.L.L.A.	Front Page Music	
18	Dro Kenji	Wish You Were Here	Internet Money, 10K Projects	
18	EST Gee	El Toro 2	CMG, Interscope Records	Debuted at No. 57 on the Billboard 200
18	Genesis Owusu	Struggler	Ourness, House Anxiety	Debuted at No. 4 on the ARIA Albums Chart
18	Giggs	Zero Tolerance	No BS Music	Debuted at No. 48 on the UK Albums Chart
18	Leon Thomas	Electric Dusk	UMG Recordings, EZMNY Records, Motown Records	
18	Lil Zay Osama	4 The Trenches	Warner Records	
18	Mick Jenkins	The Patience	RBC Records	
18	Nickelus F	The Specimen: Issue 00	AGM	
18	Quavo	Rocket Power	Quality Control Music, Motown Records, Capitol Records	Debuted at No. 18 on the Billboard 200
18	Quelle Chris & Cavalier	Death Tape 1: Black Cottonwood	Death Fame, SavCav Music	
18	Russ	SANTIAGO	DIEMON Records	Debuted at No. 12 on the Billboard 200
18	Sha Ek	Courtlandt Over Everything	Defiant Records, Warner Records	
22	Autumn!	Midnight Club	Self-released	
23	D2x	Hotel 1105	Self-released	
25	Abhi the Nomad	Abhi vs the Universe II	UnderCurrent	
25	Ashnikko	Weedkiller	Warner Records	Debuted at No. 105 on the Billboard 200
25	Bermuda Yae & Pi'erre Bourne	The 5th	SossHouse Records	
25	BONES	BasketCase	TeamSESH, Empire	
25	Danger Mouse & Jemini the Gifted One	Born Again	Lex Records	
25	Digga D	Back to Square One	Black Money Records	Debuted at No. 6 on the UK Albums Chart
25	DJ Muggs	Soul Assassins 3	Soul Assassins Records	
25	Earl Sweatshirt & The Alchemist	Voir Dire	Tan Cressida, ALC Records	
25	Fat Tony & Taydex	I Will Make A Baby In This Damn Economy	Self-released	
25	Fridayy	Fridayy	Lost In Melody, Def Jam Recordings	
25	Jaboukie	All who can't hear must feel	Interscope Records	
25	K Suave	Midnight in Malibu	1400/800, Slayer Academy, Create Music Group	
25	Lil Yachty	Tesla	Quality Control Music, Motown Records	Debuted at No. 180 on the Billboard 200
25	Maluma	Don Juan	Sony Music, Ultra Records	Debuted at No. 195 on the Billboard 200
25	Mello Music Group	Omakase	Mello Music Group	
25	Nyck Caution	NYCKSTAPE	Self-released	
25	Open Mike Eagle	Another Triumph of Ghetto Engineering	Auto Reverse	
25	Sauce Walka	Dat Boy Den	The Sauce Familia, Empire	
25	Yung Gravy & bbno$	Baby Gravy 3	Baby Gravy, Imperial	
27	9th Wonder	Zion IX	Jamla Records	
28	NCT	Golden Age	SM	Debuted at No. 1 on the Circle Album Chart; Debuted at No. 66 on the Billboard 200
29	Blac Youngsta	Blac Sheep 2	Heavy Camp, Create Music Group	
29	Thelonious Martin	Season 1. Episode 8.	The Home Team Music Group	
30	Coi Leray	Blue Moon	Uptown Records, Republic Records	

=== September ===
Day	Artist(s)	Album	Record label(s)	Entering chart position
1	Blu & Real Bad Man	Bad News	Real Bad Man Records	
1	Blxst & Bino Rideaux	Sixtape 3	EVGLE, Out the Blue, Def Jam, Redbull Records	
1	Chiddy Bang	Saved By the Swell	Adventure Records	
1	Da$h	Skrewface 2	Hz Global	
1	Illa J	No Traffic	Self-released	
1	Jehry Robinson	Drink More Water	Strange Music, INgrooves	
1	Midwxst	E3	Geffen Records	
1	Smoke DZA & Flying Lotus	Flying Objects	Smoker's Club Records	
6	Stray Kids	Social Path / Super Bowl	Epic Japan	
7	Frisco & INFAMOUSIZAK	Winning Team	The Den Records	
8	38 Spesh & Conway the Machine	Speshal Machinery	TCF Music Group	
8	Cam'ron	The Lost Files: Vol. 1	Killa Ent, GoodTalk	
8	Curren$y & Jet Life	Season Opener	Jet Life Recordings	
8	Gaika	Drift	Big Dada Recordings	
8	Joey Valence & Brae	Punk Tactics	JVB Records	
8	K.A.A.N. & Dem Jointz	Peace of Mindz	K.A.A.N. Life Music, U Made Us What We Are	
8	Lancey Foux	BACK2DATRAP	Human Resources Records	
8	Lil Peep & iLoveMakonnen	Diamonds	Waiting To Be Found, AWAL	
8	M Huncho	my neighbours don't know	MYB ENT, EGA Distro	Debuted at No. 9 on the UK Albums Chart
8	Planet Asia & Apollo Brown	Sardines	Mello Music Group	
8	Real Boston Richey	Welcome to Bubba Land	Freebandz, Epic Records	Debuted at No. 94 on the Billboard 200
8	Slim Thug	Midlife Crisis	SoSouth	
8	Teezo Touchdown	How Do You Sleep at Night?	RCA, Not Fit for Society	
8	XXXTentacion	ItWasntEnough (re-release)	Bad Vibes Forever, Columbia Records	
12	Bizzy Bone	The Waste Lands	Self-released	
13	3 Headed Monster (Violent J, Esham & Ouija Macc)	Rampage	Psychopathic Records	
14	Nas	Magic 3	Mass Appeal	Debuted at No. 65 on the Billboard 200
14	Zelooperz & Quadie Diesel	Quazel	Bruiser Brigade	
15	City Morgue	My Bloody America	Hikari-Ultra, Republic Records	
15	Diddy	The Love Album: Off the Grid	Love Records, Motown Records	Debuted at No. 19 on the Billboard 200
15	Rod Wave	Nostalgia	Alamo Records, Sony Music	Debuted at No. 1 on the Billboard 200
15	Sleepy Hallow	Boy Meets World	Winners Circle Entertainment, RCA Records	Debuted at No. 17 on the Billboard 200
15	Vic Mensa	Victor	Savemoney, Roc Nation	
18	Logic	Inglorious Basterd	Self-released	
18	Summrs	What We Didn't Have	10K Projects	
22	2Rare	Truth or Rare	No Love Entertainment, Warner Records	
22	DaBoii	NO BAIL	YWN	
22	Doja Cat	Scarlet	Kemosabe Records, RCA Records	Debuted at No. 4 on the Billboard 200
22	EarthGang & Spillage Village	RIP Human Art	Dreamville	
22	Headie One & K-Trap	Strength to Strength	One Records, Thousand8	Debuted at No. 4 on the UK Albums Chart
22	jev.	Lonerwrld, vol 1	Loner, inc.	
22	Joey Cool	Enjoy the View	Strange Music, INgrooves	
22	Lil Tecca	TEC	Galactic Records, Republic Records	Debuted at No. 11 on the Billboard 200
22	L'Orange	Old Soul (re-release)	Old Soul Music	
22	MIKE, Wiki & The Alchemist	Faith Is a Rock	ALC Records	
22	Money Man	Catch Me If You Can	Black Circle, Empire	
22	ShittyBoyz	Trifecta 3: The Finale	The Hip Hop Lab Records, Empire Distribution	
22	Tom MacDonald & Adam Calhoun	The Brave II	Self-released	Debuted at No. 62 on the Billboard 200
29	Armand Hammer	We Buy Diabetic Test Strips	Backwoodz Studioz, PTP	
29	Kelvin Krash	HARSH	KRASHED	
29	Lil Wayne	Tha Fix Before Tha VI	Young Money Entertainment, Republic Records	Debuted at No. 40 on the Billboard 200
29	Lil Yachty	The Secret Recipe	Quality Control Music, Motown Records	Debuted at No. 170 on the Billboard 200
29	Rome Streetz	Noise Kandy 5	The Influenyce Enterprise	
29	Twiztid & DJ Godzila	Odyssey	Majik Ninja Entertainment	
29	Viper	You'll Cowards Don't Even Smoke Crack 3	Rhyme Tyme Records, SoSouth Music Distribution	
29	YG & Tyga	Hit Me When U Leave The Klub: The Playlist	4Hunnid Records, Last Kings Music, Empire	Debuted at No. 101 on the Billboard 200
29	Yo Gotti, Moneybagg Yo & CMG The Label	Gangsta Art 2	CMG, Interscope Records	Debuted at No. 78 on the Billboard 200

=== October ===
Day	Artist(s)	Album	Record label(s)	Entering chart position
1	R.A.P. Ferreira	ASIATIQUE BLACK WIZARD LILY FUNK	Self-released	
1	Slug Christ	Plant Mentality 4	Awful Records	
6	Bishop Nehru	Mysteries of Initiation	Nehruvia	
6	Butcher Brown	Solar Music	Concord Jazz	
6	Drake	For All the Dogs	OVO Sound, Republic Records	Debuted at No. 1 on the Billboard 200
6	Hooligan Hefs	Sinning Winning Living	BIORDI	
6	Kool Keith	Mr. Controller	Junkadelic Music	
6	Matt Ox	Teenrage	Ox	
6	Merlyn Wood	Dirty Thunder	Don't Be Greedy	
6	Mndsgn	Snaxxx	Stones Throw Records	
6	NCT 127	Fact Check	SM	Debuted at No. 1 on the Circle Album Chart; Debuted at No. 16 on the Billboard 200
6	Nines	Crop Circle 3	Zino Records	Debuted at No. 2 on the UK Albums Chart
6	ODUMODUBLVCK	EZIOKWU	NATIVE Records, Def Jam Recordings, UMG Recordings	
6	P Money & Whiney	Streets, Love & Other Stuff	Hospital Records	
6	Pitbull	Trackhouse	Mr. 305 Records	
6	RJMrLA	OMMIO Drama	Empire	
6	Slauson Malone 1	Excelsior	Warp	
6	Spinabenz	Old Twin	Tornado Kidd	
6	Wiz Khalifa	Khali Sober	Taylor Gang Entertainment	
10	Peezy	GHETTO	#Boyz Entertainment, Empire	
12	TOBi	PANIC	RCA Records, Sony Music Entertainment	
13	Bad Bunny	Nadie Sabe Lo Que Va a Pasar Mañana	Rimas	Debuted at No. 1 on the Billboard 200
13	Benji.	Love Gun	SinceThe80s	
13	DaBaby	Let's Do It	South Coast Music Group, Interscope Records	
13	DJ Muggs & Dean Hurley	Divinity (Original Motion Picture Soundtrack)	Soul Assassin Records, Sacred Bones Records	
13	Guilty Simpson	Escalation	Uncommon Records	
13	Hunxho	For Her	300 Entertainment	Debuted at No. 145 on the Billboard 200
13	Jay Worthy, Kamaiyah & Harry Fraud	THE AM3RICAN DREAM	GDF, Keep It Lit Records, SRFSCHL, LLC	
13	Kaliii	FCK GIRL SZN	Atlantic Records	
13	Ken Carson	A Great Chaos	Opium, Interscope	Debuted at No. 11 on the Billboard 200
13	MIKE	Burning Desire	10k	
13	Mist	Redemption	Warner Records UK, Sickmade Ent	
13	Offset	Set It Off	Universal Music Group, Motown Records	Debuted at No. 5 on the Billboard 200
13	Paul Wall & Termanology	Start Finish Repeat	Perfect Time Music Group	
13	Peewee Longway	Who Am I?	MPA Bandcamp Music Group, Empire	
13	Ren	Sick Boi	The Other Songs	Debuted at No. 1 on the UK Albums Chart; Debuted at No. 137 on the Billboard 200
13	The Streets	The Darker the Shadow the Brighter the Light	679 Recordings, Warner Music UK	Debuted at No. 7 on the UK Albums Chart
13	Westside Gunn	And Then You Pray for Me	Griselda Records, Empire	Debuted at No. 29 on the Billboard 200
16	Planet Asia	Kings Chamber	Gold Chain Music	
17	Gucci Mane	Breath of Fresh Air	1017 Records, Atlantic Records	Debuted at No. 141 on the Billboard 200
20	A-Reece	P2: The Big Hearted Bad Guy	Revenge Club Records	
20	City Girls	RAW	Quality Control Music, Capitol Records, Motown Records	Debuted at No. 117 on the Billboard 200
20	Jeshi	The Great Stink	Because Music	
20	Joony	Memento	Red Bull Records	
20	KXNG Crooked & Joell Ortiz	Prosper	Hitmaker Music Group	
20	Meechy Darko	Doses	Durt Cobain, Loma Vista Recordings	
20	NSG	AREA BOYZ	NSG Entertainment	Debuted at No. 28 on the UK Albums Chart
20	Rexx Life Raj	California Poppy 3	Empire	
20	Sweata & Mu$	Don Music (A Fasss Auntie Tape)	Jamla Records	
20	Trae tha Truth	Stuck in Motion	Empire	
20	Valee & MVW	Valeedation	MVW Productions, Fake Shore Drive	
20	Young Scooter	Streets Krazy	Empire	
25	Radamiz	El Duende!	Big Enough Home	
27	Ace Hood	B.O.D.Y.	Hood Nation, Empire	
27	Ameer Vann & Merlyn Wood	Slime in the Ice Machine	Blacksmith Recordings	
27	BabyTron	Megatron 2	The Hip Hop Lab, Empire	Debuted at No. 110 on the Billboard 200
27	CASISDEAD	Famous Last Words	XL Recordings	Debuted at No. 7 on the UK Albums Chart
27	DJ Shadow	Action Adventure	Reconstruction Productions, Mass Appeal Records	
27	Domo Genesis & Graymatter	WHAT YOU DON'T GET!?	Things Happen	
27	Homixide Gang	5th Amndmnt	Opium	
27	Kamaal Williams	Stings	Black Focus	
27	King Iso	iLLdren	Strange Music, Project Be Well, INgrooves	
27	Kojaque	Phantom of the Afters	Soft Boy Records	
27	Money Man	Croptober	Black Circle, Empire Distribution	
27	NLE Choppa	Cottonwood 2 (Deluxe 2.0)	Warner Records	
27	Shabazz Palaces	Robed in Rareness	Sub Pop Records	
27	Sheek Louch	Gorillaween 5	D Block Records	
27	Shordie Shordie & Murda Beatz	Memory Lane 2	Warner Records	
27	Thouxanbanfauni	Living Loathe	Create Music Group	
27	Warhol.SS	3200 VOL 2	Create Music Group	
27	Wifisfuneral	Black Heart Revenge 2	Living Dead	
31	Lloyd Banks	Halloween Havoc IV: The 72nd Hr	Money by Any Means, INC	
31	Mansionz	Mansionz 2	Island Records, UMG Recordings	
31	Na-Kel Smith	Stand Alone Stuntman	A DREAM NO LONGER DEFERRED RECORDS	
31	Pink Siifu & Turich Benjy	It's Too Quiet...'!!	Dynamite Hill, Equity	
31	Robb Banks & Tony Shhnow	I Can't Feel My Face Too	430 ENT/DEATHLESS	
31	RXKNephew	Certified Alcoholic	New Breed Trapper, NEWWRLD	
31	Tech N9ne, Zkeircrow & Phlaque the Grimstress	NNUTTHOWZE - Signaling the Siqly	Strange Music	

=== November ===
Day	Artist(s)	Album	Record label(s)	Entering chart position
2	BiC Fizzle	Chosen 1K	1017 Records, Atlantic Recording Corporation	
3	Black Rob	Life Story 2	Crazy Cat Catalogue	
3	Calboy	UNCHAINED	Self-Released	
3	Jeezy	I Might Forgive... But I Don't Forget	CTE New World	Debuted at No. 21 on the Billboard 200
3	JK-47 & Jay Orient	Revision For Regrowth	Self-Released	
3	Kevin Abstract	Blanket	Video Store, RCA	
3	Raedio	Rap Sh!t: The Mixtape (From the Max Original Series)	Raedio, Def Jam	
3	Sonny Digital	Dolores Son	Atlantic Records	
3	Tee Grizzley	Tee's Coney Island	300 Entertainment	Debuted at No. 65 on the Billboard 200
3	The Alchemist	Flying High, Part 2	ALC Records	
3	Tkay Maidza	Sweet Justice	4AD	
10	Aesop Rock	Integrated Tech Solutions	Rhymesayers Entertainment	Debuted at No. 169 on the Billboard 200
10	Chris Brown	11:11	CBE, RCA Records	Debuted at No. 9 on the Billboard 200
10	Cochise	Care Package	Columbia Records, Sony Music Entertainment	
10	D Double E & TenBillion Dreams	No Reign, No Flowers	Bluku Music	
10	Fresco Trey	Detour	Warner Records	
10	Kodak Black	When I Was Dead	Vulture Love, Capitol Records	Debuted at No. 74 on the Billboard 200
10	Larry June & Cardo	The Night Shift	The FreeMinded, Empire	Debuted at No. 112 on the Billboard 200
10	Lola Brooke	Dennis Daughter	Team Eighty Productions, Arista Records	
10	Lord Apex	The Good Fight	E/M Worldwide	
10	Luh Kel	Head Melodies	Different Vibes Only, MNRK Records	
10	Rick Ross & Meek Mill	Too Good to Be True	Maybach Music Group, Dream Chasers Records, gamma.	Debuted at No. 23 on the Billboard 200
10	StanWill	Unstoppable	The Hip Hop Lab, Empire Distribution	
10	The Kid Laroi	The First Time	Columbia Records, Sony Music Entertainment	Debuted at No. 3 on the ARIA Albums Chart; Debuted at No. 26 on the Billboard 200
10	Trippie Redd	Saint Michael	1400 Entertainment, 10K Projects	Debuted at No. 161 on the Billboard 200
10	Wiki & Tony Seltzer	14K Figaro	Wikset Enterprise	
10	YoungBoy Never Broke Again	Decided 2	Never Broke Again, Motown Records	Debuted at No. 17 on the Billboard 200
17	2 Chainz & Lil Wayne	Welcome 2 Collegrove	Def Jam Recordings, T.R.U., Young Money, Republic Records, Universal Music Group	Debuted at No. 20 on the Billboard 200
17	Arcángel	Sentimiento, Elegancia y Más Maldad	Rimas	Debuted at No. 195 on the Billboard 200
17	Blockhead	The Aux	Backwoodz Studioz	
17	Chillinit	420DNA	420 Family	Debuted at No. 3 on the ARIA Albums Chart
17	Danny Brown	Quaranta	Warp Records	
17	Drake	For All the Dogs Scary Hours Edition	OVO Sound, Republic Records	
17	E-40	Rule of Thumb: Rule 1	Heavy On The Grind Entertainment	
17	H31R	HeadSpace	Ninja Tune, Big Dada	
17	Homeboy Sandman	I Can't Sell These Either	Self-released	
17	Hot Dollar & 03 Greedo	Free Love	Self-released	
17	JasonMartin	A Compton Story	50 Million	
17	K.A.A.N. & Mike Summers	The Nightly News	K.A.A.N. Life Music, Squarian	
17	La Joaqui	Mal Aprendida	Dale Play	
17	Only The Family & Lil Durk	Nightmares in the Trenches	Alamo Records, Sony Music Entertainment	Debuted at No. 114 on the Billboard 200
17	Ozuna	Cosmo	Aura Music, Sony Music	Debuted at No. 116 on the Billboard 200
17	Rich Amiri	Ghetto Fabolous	Internet Money Records, 10K Projects	
17	Russ Millions	FREEDOM	One Of A Kind Music	
17	RXKNephew & Harry Fraud	Life After Neph	Fake Shore Drive, AintNobodyCool, SRFSCHL	
17	Vinnie Paz	All Are Guests in the House of God	Iron Tusk Music	
22	Towkio	Community Service 3	Self-released	
22	Various Artists	Good Burger 2 (Original Motion Picture Soundtrack)	Viacom International, Human Re Sources	
23	Chip Tha Ripper	The Charles Worth LP	S.L.A.B. Entertainment	
23	Tony Shhnow	Shadow Banned 2	Self-released	
24	Busta Rhymes	Blockbusta	The Conglomerate, Epic Records	Debuted at No. 42 on the Billboard 200
24	CJ Fly & Stoic	Piranha	Self-released	
24	Fetty Wap	King Zoo	RGF Productions, 300 Entertainment	
24	Kamaiyah	Another Summer Night	Keep it Lit Records	
24	Philthy Rich	King of Oakland	FOD ENT	
24	Trippie Redd	Saint Michael V2	1400 Entertainment, 10K Projects	

=== December ===
Day	Artist(s)	Album	Record label(s)	Entering chart position
1	AZ	Truth Be Told	Quiet Money	
1	Big Scarr	Frozone	1017 Records, Atlantic Records	
1	BigXthaPlug	The Biggest	UnitedMasters	Debuted at No. 138 on the Billboard 200
1	Czarface	Czartificial Intelligence	Silver Age	
1	Elzhi & Oh No	Heavy Vibrato	Nature Sounds	
1	Wiz Khalifa	Decisions	Taylor Gang Entertainment	
6	Yung Bans	Vol. 6	1 Of 1, AWAL	
8	Berner & OhGeesy	Trophies	Bern One Entertainment, Empire Distribution	
8	Blu & Nottz	Afrika	Self-released	
8	Hitkidd	Renegade	Blac Noize!!, Campsouth Records	
8	Li Rye	Li Rye vs Li Reezy	1017 Records, Atlantic Records	
8	Lil Poppa	It's Me, I'm The Problem	CMG, Interscope Records	
8	Moneybagg Yo, BIG30 & N Less Entertainment	We Connected	N Less Entertainment, Connect Music	
8	Nicki Minaj	Pink Friday 2	Young Money Entertainment, Republic Records	Debuted at No. 1 on the Billboard 200
8	Night Lovell	I Hope You're Happy	G59 Records	
8	Rowdy Rebel	Back Outside	GoodTalk	
12	Pardison Fontaine	SEXT8PE	Section 8 Music	
13	BigWalkDog	Playoff	1017 Records, Atlantic Records	
15	Bas	We Only Talk About Real Shit When We're Fucked Up	Dreamville, Interscope, Universal	
15	Big K.R.I.T.	Regardless It's Still Timeless	Multi Alumni	
15	Gucci Mane & B.G.	Choppers & Bricks	1017 Records & Atlantic Records	
15	Lil Zay Osama	Hood Bible 2	Warner Records	
15	Meekz	Meekzness	Self-released	
15	Starlito	Love Drug	Grind Hard	
15	YTB Fatt	Foxes Only	Loaf Boyz Ventures, 10K Projects	
20	BossMan Dlow	2 Slippery	Alamo Records, Sony Music Entertainment	Debuted at No. 197 on the Billboard 200
20	Lil B	Winged Wheelchair Squad	BasedWorld Records	
22	Bun B & Statik Selektah	Trillstatik 3	II Trill Enterprises, Empire Distribution	
22	Conway the Machine & Wun Two	Palermo	Vinyl Digital	
22	fakemink	London's Saviour	EtnaVeraVela	
22	G's Us (R.A.P. Ferreira & AJ Suede)	What Them Dogs Don't Know They Know	Ruby Yacht, Alpha Pup	
25	Keith Ape	The X-Mas is Mine	UnderWater	
29	Westside Gunn, Conway the Machine & The Alchemist	Hall & Nash 2	ALC	

== Highest-charting songs ==
=== United States ===
Hip hop songs from any year which charted in the 2023 Top 40 of the Billboard Hot 100
Song	Artist	Project	Peak position
"Paint the Town Red"	Doja Cat	Scarlet	1
"Lovin on Me"	Jack Harlow	TBA	1
"First Person Shooter"	Drake featuring J. Cole	For All the Dogs	1
"IDGAF"	Drake featuring Yeat	For All the Dogs	2
"Search & Rescue"	Drake	—N/a	2
"All My Life"	Lil Durk featuring J. Cole	Almost Healed	2
"Creepin'"	Metro Boomin, the Weeknd and 21 Savage	Heroes & Villains	3
"Meltdown"	Travis Scott featuring Drake	Utopia	3
"Virginia Beach"	Drake	For All the Dogs	3
"Princess Diana"	Ice Spice and Nicki Minaj	Like..?	4
"FukUMean"	Gunna	A Gift & a Curse	4
"Favorite Song"	Toosii	Naujour	5
"Fe!n"	Travis Scott featuring Playboi Carti	Utopia	5
"Calling for You"	Drake featuring 21 Savage	For All the Dogs	5
"Barbie World"	Nicki Minaj, Ice Spice and Aqua	Barbie the Album	7
"K-pop"	Travis Scott, Bad Bunny and the Weeknd	Utopia	7
"Daylight"	Drake	For All the Dogs	8
"Players"	Coi Leray	Coi	9
"Fear of Heights"	Drake	For All the Dogs	10
"Just Wanna Rock"	Lil Uzi Vert	Pink Tape	10
"Flooded the Face"	Lil Uzi Vert	Pink Tape	11
"I Know ?"	Travis Scott	Utopia	11
"You Broke My Heart"	Drake	For All the Dogs Scary Hours Edition	11
"Rich Baby Daddy"	Drake featuring Sexyy Red and SZA	For All the Dogs	11
"Gently"	Drake featuring Bad Bunny	For All the Dogs	12
"Red Ruby da Sleeze"	Nicki Minaj	Pink Friday 2	13
"Put It on da Floor Again"	Latto featuring Cardi B	Sugar Honey Iced Tea	13
"Bongos"	Cardi B and Megan Thee Stallion	TBA	14
"Hyaena"	Travis Scott	Utopia	14
"Amen"	Drake featuring Teezo Touchdown	For All the Dogs	15
"7969 Santa"	Drake	For All the Dogs	16
"Fight the Feeling"	Rod Wave	Nostalgia	16
"Thank God"	Travis Scott	Utopia	16
"Topia Twins"	Travis Scott featuring Rob49 and 21 Savage	Utopia	17
"8AM in Charlotte"	Drake	For All the Dogs	17
"What Would Pluto Do"	Drake	For All the Dogs	18
"Call Your Friends"	Rod Wave	Nostalgia	18
"Come See Me"	Rod Wave	Nostalgia	19
"Oh U Went"	Young Thug featuring Drake	Business Is Business	19
"My Eyes"	Travis Scott	Utopia	19
"Endless Fashion"	Lil Uzi Vert featuring Nicki Minaj	Pink Tape	20
"Stand by Me"	Lil Durk featuring Morgan Wallen	Almost Healed	22
"Escapism"	Raye featuring 070 Shake	My 21st Century Blues	22
"Modern Jam"	Travis Scott featuring Teezo Touchdown	Utopia	23
"Turks & Caicos"	Rod Wave featuring 21 Savage	Nostalgia	24
"Boyz Don't Cry"	Rod Wave	Nostalgia	25
"Painting Pictures"	Superstar Pride	5 Lbs of Pressure	25
"Suicide Doors"	Lil Uzi Vert	Pink Tape	25
"Delresto (Echoes)"	Travis Scott and Beyoncé	Utopia	25
"Telekinesis"	Travis Scott featuring SZA and Future	Utopia	26
"Evil Ways"	Drake featuring J. Cole	For All the Dogs Scary Hours Edition	26
"All the Parties"	Drake featuring Chief Keef	For All the Dogs	26
"Drew a Picasso"	Drake	For All the Dogs	27
"Sirens"	Travis Scott	Utopia	27
"God's Country"	Travis Scott	Utopia	28
"Slut Me Out"	NLE Choppa	Cottonwood 2	28
"Back to the Moon"	Gunna	A Gift & a Curse	29
"Another Late Night"	Drake featuring Lil Yachty	For All the Dogs	29
"Set Me Free Pt. 2"	Jimin	Face	30
"Great Gatsby"	Rod Wave	Nostalgia	30
"Attention"	Doja Cat	Scarlet	31
"Aye"	Lil Uzi Vert featuring Travis Scott	Pink Tape	31
"Away from Home"	Drake	For All the Dogs	32
"Cobra"	Megan Thee Stallion	Megan	32
"Dogtooth"	Tyler, the Creator	Call Me If You Get Lost: The Estate Sale	33
"Peaches & Eggplants"	Young Nudy featuring 21 Savage	Gumbo	33
"Area Codes"	Kaliii	Toxic Chocolate	33
"Skitzo"	Travis Scott featuring Young Thug	Utopia	34
"Needle"	Nicki Minaj featuring Drake	Pink Friday 2	34
"Pelle Coat"	Lil Durk	Almost Healed	35
"Circus Maximus"	Travis Scott featuring the Weeknd and Swae Lee	Utopia	36
"Til Further Notice"	Travis Scott featuring James Blake and 21 Savage	Utopia	38
"America Has a Problem"	Beyoncé featuring Kendrick Lamar	Renaissance	38
"Parade on Cleveland"	Young Thug featuring Drake	Business Is Business	39
"Long Journey"	Rod Wave	Nostalgia	39
"Nostalgia"	Rod Wave and Wet	Nostalgia	40

=== United Kingdom ===
Hip hop songs from any year which charted in the 2023 Top 10 of the UK Singles Chart
Song	Artist	Project	Peak position
"Sprinter"	Dave and Central Cee	Split Decision	1
"Escapism"	Raye featuring 070 Shake	My 21st Century Blues	1
"Who Told You"	J Hus featuring Drake	Beautiful and Brutal Yard	2
"Let Go"	Central Cee	—N/a	6
"Pakistan"	D-Block Europe and Clavish	DBE World	8
"Martin's Sofa"	Headie One	The Last One	9
"Out of Nowhere"	Bugzy Malone and TeeDee	The Great British Dream	9
"Tony Soprano 2"	Nines	Crop Circle 2	10

== Highest first-week consumption ==
List of albums with the highest first-week consumption (sales + streaming + track equivalent), as of December 2023 in the United States
Number	Album	Artist	1st-week consumption	1st-week position	Refs
1	Utopia	Travis Scott	496,000	1	
2	For All the Dogs	Drake	402,000	1	
3	Pink Friday 2	Nicki Minaj	228,000	1	
4	Pink Tape	Lil Uzi Vert	167,000	1	
5	Nostalgia	Rod Wave	137,000	1	
6	Almost Healed	Lil Durk	125,000	3	
7	Hope	NF	123,000	2	
8	Business Is Business	Young Thug	89,000	2	
9	A Gift & a Curse	Gunna	85,000	3	
10	Scarlet	Doja Cat	72,000	4	

== All critically reviewed albums ranked ==
=== Metacritic ===
Number	Artist	Album	Average score	Number of reviews	Reference
1	billy woods & Kenny Segal	Maps	90	10 reviews	
2	Armand Hammer	We Buy Diabetic Test Strips	87	12 reviews	
3	Noname	Sundial	87	10 reviews	
4	JPEGMAFIA & Danny Brown	Scaring the Hoes	86	13 reviews	
5	Nas	Magic 3	86	5 reviews	
6	Big Freedia	Central City	86	4 reviews	
7	Mick Jenkins	The Patience	86	4 reviews	
8	Aesop Rock	Integrated Tech Solutions	84	7 reviews	
9	Paris Texas	Mid Air	84	5 reviews	
10	Potter Payper	Real Back in Style	84	4 reviews	
11	Earl Sweatshirt & The Alchemist	Voir Dire	83	9 reviews	
12	McKinley Dixon	Beloved! Paradise! Jazz!?	83	6 reviews	
13	Danny Brown	Quaranta	82	15 reviews	
14	Genesis Owusu	Struggler	82	11 reviews	
15	Young Nudy	Gumbo	82	5 reviews	
16	El Michels Affair & Black Thought	Glorious Game	81	7 reviews	
17	Slowthai	Ugly	80	16 reviews	
18	J Hus	Beautiful and Brutal Yard	78	8 reviews	
19	Ashnikko	Weedkiller	78	6 reviews	
20	Rae Sremmurd	Sremm 4 Life	78	6 reviews	
21	Killer Mike	Michael	77	15 reviews	
22	Tkay Maidza	Sweet Justice	77	7 reviews	
23	Oddisee	To What End	75	4 reviews	
24	Westside Gunn	And Then You Pray for Me	74	4 reviews	
25	Lil Yachty	Let's Start Here	73	9 reviews	
26	Quavo	Rocket Power	73	5 reviews	
27	NLE Choppa	Cottonwood 2	72	4 reviews	
28	Skrillex	Don't Get Too Close	72	4 reviews	
29	Nas	Magic 2	71	7 reviews	
30	Shabazz Palaces	Robed in Rareness	71	7 reviews	
31	Macklemore	Ben	71	4 reviews	
32	Doja Cat	Scarlet	70	13 reviews	
33	Nicki Minaj	Pink Friday 2	70	12 reviews	
34	Gunna	a Gift & a Curse	68	6 reviews	
35	2 Chainz & Lil Wayne	Welcome 2 Collegrove	68	5 reviews	
36	Don Toliver	Love Sick	68	5 reviews	
37	Travis Scott	Utopia	67	13 reviews	
38	Offset	Set It Off	67	8 reviews	
39	Lil Uzi Vert	Pink Tape	64	6 reviews	
40	Young Thug	Business Is Business	64	6 reviews	
41	Coi Leray	Coi	63	4 reviews	
42	Jack Harlow	Jackman	60	6 reviews	
43	Lil Durk	Almost Healed	60	6 reviews	
44	Trippie Redd	Mansion Musik	58	5 reviews	
45	The Kid LAROI	The First Time	58	4 reviews	
46	Teezo Touchdown	How Do You Sleep at Night?	56	7 reviews	
47	Drake	For All the Dogs	53	12 reviews	
48	Busta Rhymes	Blockbusta	53	5 reviews	

=== AnyDecentMusic? ===
Number	Artist	Album	Average score	Number of reviews	Reference
1	billy woods & Kenny Segal	Maps	8.4	9 reviews	
2	JPEGMAFIA & Danny Brown	Scaring the Hoes	8.0	11 reviews	
3	Genesis Owusu	Struggler	7.7	13 reviews	
4	Danny Brown	Quaranta	7.6	15 reviews	
5	Killer Mike	MICHAEL	7.6	14 reviews	
6	J Hus	Beautiful and Brutal Yard	7.3	7 reviews	
7	Lil Yachty	Let's Start Here	7.1	7 reviews	
8	Rae Sremmurd	Sremm 4 Life	6.9	7 reviews	
9	Doja Cat	Scarlet	6.6	10 reviews	
10	Travis Scott	Utopia	6.2	7 reviews	
11	Drake	For All the Dogs	4.7	9 reviews	

== See also ==
- Previous article: 2022 in hip-hop
- Next article: 2024 in hip-hop
