= BigWalkDog =

American rapper (born 1996)

- Walker in 2022

Background information
- Born: Da'Jour Walker; October 11, 1996 (age 30)
- Origin: Tutwiler, Mississippi
- Genres: Hip hop; trap
- Occupations: Rapper; songwriter
- Instrument: Vocals
- Years active: 2020–present
- Labels: 1017; Atlantic

Da'Jour Walker (born October 11, 1996), known professionally as BigWalkDog, is an American rapper. Born in Tutwiler, Mississippi, he rose to prominence after being signed to Gucci Mane's record label 1017 Records in May 2021. His debut mixtape, Trick City, charted on the Billboard 200.

== Early life ==
Walker was born on October 11, 1996, in Tutwiler, Mississippi. During his youth, he played football as a linebacker and tight end.

== Career ==
Walker began his rap career in 2020.

In May 2021, Walker signed with rapper Gucci Mane's record label 1017 Records. He released his debut commercial single, "Poppin", which featured Gucci and appeared on Gucci's studio album Ice Daddy. The track has since been certified Gold by the Recording Industry Association of America. In July, Walker released "Whole Lotta Ice", his follow-up single that featured Lil Baby and Pooh Shiesty.

On September 23, 2022, Walker released his debut mixtape, Trick City. An extended version was released three days later, and the project debuted at number 125 on the Billboard 200, marking his first solo entry onto the chart.

A deluxe version of Trick City was released on March 31, 2023. On December 13, 2023, Walker released his second mixtape, Playoff.

In October 2024, Walker was dropped from 1017 and Atlantic after Gucci Mane decided to only keep Pooh Shiesty and Foogiano under the label.

In February 2025, Walker signed a contract with UnitedMasters. He released his third mixtape, Nightmares and Dreams, on December 5, 2025.

== Discography ==
=== Studio albums ===
| Title | Album details |
|---|---|
| Until Then | Released: June 5, 2026; Label: UnitedMasters; Format: Digital download, streaming |

=== Compilation albums ===
| Title | Album details | Peak chart positions | | | Certifications |
| Title | Album details | US | US R&B/HH | US Rap | Certifications |
|---|---|---|---|---|---|
| So Icy Boyz (with 1017) | Released: October 15, 2021; Label: 1017, Atlantic; Format: Digital download, streaming | 42 | 22 | 21 | |
| So Icy Christmas (with 1017) | Released: December 17, 2021; Label: 1017, Atlantic; Format: Digital download, streaming | — | — | — | |
| So Icy Gang: The ReUp (with 1017) | Released: June 17, 2022; Label: 1017, Atlantic; Format: Digital download, streaming | 39 | 19 | 14 | |
| So Icy Boyz 22 (with 1017) | Released: October 17, 2022; Label: 1017, Atlantic; Format: Digital download, streaming | — | — | — | |
| So Icy Boyz: The Finale (with 1017) | Released: December 9, 2022; Label: 1017, Atlantic; Format: Digital download, streaming | — | — | — | RIAA: Gold |

=== Mixtapes ===
| Title | Mixtape details | Peak chart positions |
| Title | Mixtape details | US |
|---|---|---|
| Trick City | Released: September 23, 2022; Label: 1017, Atlantic; Format: Digital download, streaming | 125 |
| Playoff | Released: December 13, 2023; Label: 1017, Atlantic; Format: Digital download, streaming | — |
| Nightmares and Dreams | Released: December 5, 2025; Label: UnitedMasters; Format: Digital download, streaming | — |

=== Singles ===
==== As lead artist ====
| Title | Year | Certifications | Album |
|---|---|---|---|
| "Poppin" (with Gucci Mane) | 2021 | RIAA: Gold | So Icy Boyz, Ice Daddy and Trick City |
| "Whole Lotta Ice" (featuring Lil Baby and Pooh Shiesty) | 2021 | | So Icy Boyz and Trick City |
| "Came from the Bottom" | 2021 | | So Icy Boyz (Deluxe) and Trick City |
| "Vert" (featuring Big Scarr) | 2021 | | So Icy Boyz (Deluxe) and Trick City |
| "Motion" | 2021 | | So Icy Christmas and Trick City (Extended) |
| "Real as It Gets" | 2022 | | Trick City (Extended) |
| "Nino" | 2022 | | Trick City |
| "Love of the Money" (featuring Hotboii) | 2022 | | Trick City (Extended) |
| "Skywalka" | 2022 | | Trick City |
| "How It Go" | 2022 | | Trick City |
| "Uncle Tommy" | 2022 | | Trick City |
| "Red Flag" (with Gucci Mane and BiC Fizzle) | 2022 | | So Icy Boyz 22 |
| "Mary Jane" | 2023 | | Trick City |
| "Feeling Like Wop" (featuring Gucci Mane) | 2023 | | Trick City (Deluxe) |
| "Worldwide" | 2023 | | Trick City (Deluxe) |
| "Protect Me From Evil" | 2023 | | Trick City (Deluxe) |
| "Whole Nother League" | 2023 | | Trick City (Deluxe) |
| "On They Neck" | 2023 | | Playoff |
| "I Promise" | 2023 | | Playoff |
| "Talk to Em" (featuring Veeze) | 2023 | | Playoff |
| "Freestyle" | 2023 | | Playoff |
| "Day in the Life" | 2023 | | Playoff |
| "Hold of Me" | 2024 | | Non-album singles |
| "Do It" | 2024 | | Non-album singles |
| "Shine on Me" | 2024 | | Non-album singles |
| "Forget" | 2024 | | Non-album singles |
| "Stylin for Free" | 2025 | | Non-album singles |
| "Call on Me" | 2025 | | Non-album singles |
| "Don't Go" | 2025 | | Non-album singles |
| "Thoughts" (featuring DeeBaby) | 2025 | | Until Then |
| "For the Money" | 2025 | | Non-album single |
| "Crashout" | 2025 | | Nightmares and Dreams |
| "Sell My Dope" | 2025 | | Nightmares and Dreams |
| "Sinners" | 2026 | | Until Then |
| "Love Me" | 2026 | | Until Then |
| "Young Dro" | 2026 | | Until Then |
| "Hittin For" | 2026 | | Until Then |
| "Forehead" | 2026 | | Until Then |

==== As featured artist ====
| Title | Year | Album |
|---|---|---|
| "Wake Up Early" (Kevo Muney featuring BigWalkDog) | 2021 | Non-album single |
| "Gelati" (Gucci Mane featuring Peewee Longway and BigWalkDog) | 2022 | So Icy Boyz 22 |
| "This One For" (Ralo featuring Money Man and BigWalkDog) | 2024 | Non-album single |

=== Guest appearances ===
| Title | Year | Other artist(s) | Album |
|---|---|---|---|
| "Blur My Vision" | 2023 | Mac Critter | Him 2 |
