= Big Scarr discography =

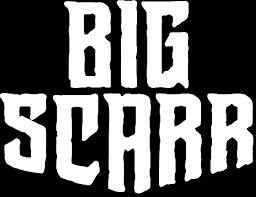
- Studio albums: 2
- Singles: 7
- Mixtapes: 1
- Compilation albums: 6

The discography of Big Scarr, an American rapper, consists of two studio albums, one mixtape, six compilation albums, and seven singles.

== Studio albums ==
List of studio albums, with selected details and chart positions
Title	Studio album details	Peak chart positions
Title	Studio album details	US
The Secret Weapon	Released: February 17, 2023; Label: Atlantic, 1017; Formats: CD, digital download, streaming, vinyl	43
Frozone	Released: December 1, 2023; Label: Atlantic, 1017; Formats: CD, digital download, streaming	—

== Compilation albums ==
List of compilation albums, with selected details and chart positions
Title	Album details	Peak chart positions		
Title	Album details	US	US R&B/HH	US Rap
So Icy Summer (with 1017)	Released: July 3, 2020; Label: GUWOP, Atlantic; Format: Digital download, streaming	29	19	19
So Icy Gang, Vol. 1 (with 1017)	Released: October 16, 2020; Label: GUWOP, Atlantic; Format: Digital download, streaming	46	26	25
So Icy Boyz (with 1017)	Released: October 15, 2021; Label: 1017, Atlantic; Format: Digital download, streaming	42	22	21
So Icy Gang: The ReUp (with 1017)	Released: June 17, 2022; Label: 1017, Atlantic; Format: Digital download, streaming	39	19	14
So Icy Boyz 22 (with 1017)	Released: October 17, 2022; Label: 1017, Atlantic; Format: Digital download, streaming	—	—	—
So Icy Boyz: The Finale (with 1017)	Released: December 9, 2022; Label: 1017, Atlantic; Format: Digital download, streaming	—	—	—

== Mixtapes ==
List of mixtapes, with selected details and chart positions
Title	Mixtape details	Peak chart positions			Certifications
Title	Mixtape details	US	US R&B/HH	US Rap	Certifications
Big Grim Reaper	Released: April 16, 2021; Label: Atlantic, 1017; Format: CD, digital download, streaming	25	14	12	RIAA: Gold

== Singles ==
List of singles, with certifications shown
Title	Year	Certifications	Album
"SoIcyBoyz" (featuring Pooh Shiesty and Foogiano)	2020		So Icy Summer and Big Grim Reaper
"Frozone"	2020		So Icy Gang, Vol. 1 and Big Grim Reaper
"SoIcyBoyz 2" (featuring Pooh Shiesty, Foogiano, and Tay Keith)	2020	RIAA: Gold	So Icy Gang, Vol. 1 and Big Grim Reaper
"I Would Keep Goin"	2021		Big Grim Reaper
"Traphouse"	2021		Big Grim Reaper
"SoIcyBoyz 3" (featuring Pooh Shiesty, Foogiano, Tay Keith, and Gucci Mane)	2021		Big Grim Reaper
"Joe Dirt"	2021		Big Grim Reaper
"First Time in Vegas"	2022		So Icy Boyz 22 and The Secret Weapon

== Guest appearances ==
Title	Year	Other artist(s)	Album
"SRT / Stolen Cars"	2020	Foolio	Love Me Like I'm Dead
