= Enchanting (rapper) =

American rapper (1997–2024)

Background information
- Born: Channing Nicole Larry; October 9, 1997; Hanau, Hesse, Germany
- Died: June 11, 2024 (aged 26) Dallas, Texas, U.S.
- Cause of death: Accidental drug overdose
- Genres: Hip-hop; trap; R&B; hardcore hip-hop
- Occupations: Rapper; singer; songwriter
- Instrument: Vocals
- Years active: 2018–2024
- Labels: 1017; LuvEnchantingINC; Change the Game
- Website: enchanting1017.com

Channing Nicole Larry (October 9, 1997 – June 11, 2024), known professionally as Enchanting, was a German-born American rapper from Fort Worth, Texas. She was signed to Gucci Mane's record label, 1017 Records, and gained initial recognition for her 2022 single, "Track & Field", featuring fellow rapper Kaliii, which gained over six million YouTube views as of the time of her death. She frequently collaborated with Gucci Mane, alongside Big Scarr, Iann Dior, Foogiano, and Kaliii.

== Early life ==
Channing Nicole Larry was born in Hanau, Germany to American parents, and spent her early years in Fort Worth, and Atlanta.

== Career ==
Larry began her music career in her late teens, performing in a church choir and being a cheerleader in high school. After graduation, she worked as a hairstylist and nail technician before pursuing a career in hip-hop and releasing music online. On March 11, 2019, Enchanting was featured on Boogotti Kasino's single "Monday", which serves as her debut single. The song earned her recognition, which led to her signing a recording deal with Gucci Mane's 1017 Records, in 2020, and subsequently released several singles and projects, including "No Luv" (2020) and Luv Scarred (2023). On February 24, 2023, she released the single "Tell Me Why" featuring Layton Greene, and was featured on Raedio's song "He Can't Reach" alongside Maiya the Don in October.

In 2024, Larry left 1017 to sign with Change the Game Music and Virgin Music Group. Her only single under the label, "Rich Money", was posthumously released on June 28, 2024.

== Death ==
On June 10, 2024, Larry was rushed to the intensive care unit and was reported to be in critical condition following a heart attack, possibly caused by a drug overdose. After false reports of her death circulated on social media, her sister, Kayy Jayy, clarified in a public post that her sister was alive, saying, "Please ignore the false reports. My sister is fine." However, at 2:26 a.m. on June 11, Larry was pronounced dead at Baylor University Medical Center in Dallas, Texas, after being removed from life support due to complications from an alleged overdose. She was 26. Her management team confirmed her death, and soon after tributes poured in from fellow artists and fans.

== Discography ==
=== Studio albums ===
List of studio albums
| Title | Album details |
|---|---|
| No Luv | Release date: November 18, 2022; Label: 1017, Atlantic; Format: Digital download, streaming |

=== Compilation albums ===
| Title | Album details | Peak chart positions | | | Certifications |
| Title | Album details | US | US R&B/HH | US Rap | Certifications |
|---|---|---|---|---|---|
| So Icy Summer (with 1017) | Released: July 3, 2020; Label: GUWOP, Atlantic; Format: Digital download, streaming | 29 | 19 | 19 | RIAA: Gold |
| So Icy Gang Vol. 1 (with 1017) | Released: October 16, 2020; Label: 1017, Atlantic; Format: Digital download, streaming | 46 | 26 | 25 | RIAA: Gold |
| So Icy Boyz (with 1017) | Released: October 15, 2021; Label: 1017, Atlantic; Format: Digital download, streaming | 42 | 22 | 21 | |
| So Icy Christmas (with 1017) | Released: December 17, 2021; Label: 1017, Atlantic; Format: Digital download, streaming | — | — | — | |
| So Icy Gang: The ReUp (with 1017) | Released: June 17, 2022; Label: 1017, Atlantic; Format: Digital download, streaming | 39 | 19 | 14 | |
| So Icy Boyz 22 (with 1017) | Released: October 17, 2022; Label: 1017, Atlantic; Format: Digital download, streaming | — | — | — | |
| So Icy Boyz: The Finale (with 1017) | Released: December 9, 2022; Label: 1017, Atlantic; Format: Digital download, streaming | — | — | — | RIAA: Gold |

=== Mixtapes ===
| Title | Mixtape details |
|---|---|
| Love & Drugs | Released: December 15, 2016; Label: Self-released; Format: Digital download, streaming |
| Nine10 the Mixtape | Released: January 16, 2017; Label: Self-released; Format: Digital download, streaming |
| 20 | Released: October 9, 2017; Label: Self-released; Format: Digital download, streaming |
| Enchanted | Released: August 31, 2018; Label: Self-released; Format: Digital download, streaming |
| 21 | Released: August 4, 2019; Label: Self-released; Format: Digital download, streaming |
| Trap & Blues | Released: February 14, 2020; Label: Self-released; Format: Digital download, streaming |
| Enchanted 2 | Released: June 15, 2020; Label: Self-released; Format: Digital download, streaming |

=== Singles ===
| Title | Year | Album |
|---|---|---|
| "Monday" | 2019 | 21 |
| "No Luv" (with K Shiday featuring Big Scarr, Key Glock and Gucci Mane) | 2020 | So Icy Gang, Vol. 1 |
| "Dead Opps" (with Big Scarr) | 2021 | Non-album single |
| "Want Sum" | 2021 | No Luv |
| "IDL" (with Big Scarr) | 2021 | Big Grim Reaper and No Luv |
| "Freaky Deaky" (featuring Coi Leray) | 2021 | No Luv |
| "Big Chant" (featuring Gucci Mane) | 2021 | So Icy Boyz and No Luv |
| "Track & Field" (featuring Kaliii) | 2021 | So Icy Boyz and No Luv |
| "Nina Ross" | 2021 | So Icy Christmas and No Luv |
| "Take It Back" | 2022 | Luv Scarred / No Luv (Deluxe) |
| "What I Want" (featuring Jacquees) | 2022 | Luv Scarred / No Luv (Deluxe) |
| "Kater to Me" (with Hitkidd) | 2022 | So Icy Boyz 22 and No Luv |
| "Issa Photoshoot" (with Gucci Mane) | 2022 | So Icy Boyz 22 and No Luv |
| "Keep It Playa" | 2022 | Luv Scarred / No Luv (Deluxe) |
| "Love Shit" | 2023 | Luv Scarred / No Luv (Deluxe) |
| "Tell Me Why" (solo or remix featuring Layton Greene) | 2023 | Luv Scarred / No Luv (Deluxe) |
| "Rich Money" | 2024 | Non-album single |
