= Taquan =

Taquan is a masculine given name. Notable people with the name include:

- Taquan Mizzell (born 1993), American football player
- Taquan Dean (born 1983), American basketball player

== See also ==
- Hotboy Wes (Wesley Takquan Lewis; born c. 1996), American rapper
- Taquan Air
