= Mack Drama =

American hip-hop producer and promoter

Mack Drama is a music producer and promoter born in Queens, New York, U.S. & raised in Los Angeles, California.

== Mack Drama signs Uneekint & Gepetto Jackson to 1017 Brick Squad Records career ==
Mack Drama is signed under Waka Flocka's Brick Squad Monopoly Records, Gucci Mane's 1017 Brick Squad Records, and Debra Antney's Mizay Entertainment, he also has his own record label called Brick Squad Mafia Records, which is branched off of Brick Squad Monopoly. Recently he has signed artist B3b3 (who just completed a single with his label featuring Akon), and announced signing another female artist; Delyric Oracle. Others under his wing include; Vee Tha Rula (from Kid Ink's label Alumni), Djayy Charliee, Joe Moses, A-Wax and YG Hootie.
