= Trap God 3 =

Mixtape by Gucci Mane
- Released: October 17, 2014
- Recorded: 2012–2013
- Genre: Southern hip-hop; trap
- Length: 53:19
- Label: 1017 Records, RBC Records
- Producer: Mike Will Made It, C4, 808 Mafia, Honorable C.N.O.T.E., Sonny Digital, Zaytoven, Purps, Cassius Jay, Drumma Boy, Dun Deal

Gucci Mane chronology
The Return of Mr. Perfect (2014)	Trap God 3 (2014)	Big Gucci Sosa (2014)

Trap God 3 is a mixtape by American rapper Gucci Mane. It serves as the third installment in his Trap God series. The album is the only one in the series to have been released during Gucci Mane's incarceration, on October 17, 2014, by 1017 Records and RBC Records. The mixtape features one lone guest appearance by Chicago rapper Chief Keef.

== Track listing ==
No.	Title	Producer(s)	Length
1.	"#TG3 Intro"	Mike Will Made It	1:43
2.	"Stand 4 It"	Dun Deal	3:22
3.	"Speed Bumps"	Mike Will Made It	3:31
4.	"Shit Shouldn't Happen"	C4	3:08
5.	"I Don't Do Roofs"	Drumma Boy	3:09
6.	"Making Money"	Purps	4:20
7.	"Swole Pocket Shawty"	Honorable C.N.O.T.E.	3:40
8.	"Young Ho"	Purps	3:55
9.	"My Lil Gee"	808 Mafia	4:40
10.	"Start Pimpin'" (featuring Chief Keef)	Honorable C.N.O.T.E.	2:58
11.	"Finger Waves"	Honorable C.N.O.T.E.	2:01
12.	"So Hoody"	Zaytoven	3:13
13.	"Plenty Mo'"	Mike Will Made It	3.21
14.	"Go for It"	Sonny Digital	3:05
15.	"5 O'Clock"		3:07
16.	"Informant"		3:16
17.	"Trap Goddess (Outro)"	Cassius Jay, Zaytoven	1:12
Total length:			53:19
