= Ralo =

American rapper

- Ralo in 2025

Background information
- Also known as: Ralo Stylz
- Born: Terrell Davis; February 12, 1995 (age 31); Atlanta, Georgia, U.S.
- Genres: Hip hop; trap
- Occupation: Rapper
- Years active: 2015–present
- Labels: Famerica; 300; Cash Money; Black Migo Gang; 1017 Eskimo; Interscope
- Website: www.ralomusic.com

Terrell Davis, better known by the stage name Ralo, is an American rapper. Born in Atlanta, Georgia, he first gained recognition following the release of his 2015 single, "Can't Lie" (featuring Future). He signed with Birdman's Cash Money Records and Young Scooter's Black Migo Gang in 2016, which entered a joint venture with Gucci Mane's short-lived Interscope Records imprint, 1017 Eskimo Records the following year.

Spin magazine placed the song at number 65 on its "Every Future Song of 2015, Ranked" list. In 2015, Ralo released the mixtapes Famerican Gangster and Diary of the Streets.

== Personal life ==
Davis is from Atlanta, Georgia. He practices Islam.

== Legal issues ==
In 2018, two private jets traced back to Davis were searched by the police and found to contain 964 pounds of marijuana (worth $1,840,000, according to prosecutors), illegal at the state and federal level in Georgia. This would lead to him being arrested in April 2018 for conspiracy to possess with the intent to distribute at least a kilogram of marijuana. Additionally, Davis' record label, Famerica Records, was alleged of a being a front business for the gang "Famerica" with Davis claimed as the leader, so Davis was also charged with money laundering and racketeering. Davis owned an apartment complex, which he referred to as "Lil Pakistan" and it was raided by police following the arrest. When Davis was first arrested, he was denied bond because the judge believed he was still running a drug empire behind bars. In July 2020, Davis would successfully appeal this and he posted a $250,000 bond, before it was revoked in December after the judge found out Davis was using his Apple Watch to arrange drug deals during his time in jail. Davis refused to testify in court, but in March 2022, he was sentenced to 97 months in federal prison and five years of supervised release after pleading guilty to multiple charges. His sentence was reduced to 20 months due to serving 4 years in jail, having good behavior, and 1 year of his sentence being replaced by time in a halfway house. He was released in November 2023.

== Discography ==
=== Mixtapes ===
List of mixtapes, showing selected details
Title	Details
Famerican Gangster	Released: April 10, 2015; Label: Famerica Records; Format: Download
Diary of the Streets	Released: November 26, 2015; Label: Famerica Records; Format: Download
The Dream Team (with Young Scooter)	Released: July 29, 2016; Label: Famerica Records; Format: Download
Diary of the Streets II	Released: August 30, 2016; Label: Famerica Records, Black Migo Gang, Cash Money; Format: Download
Famerican Gangster II	Released: February 12, 2017; Label: Famerica Records, Black Migo Gang, Cash Money; Format: Download
Ralo Laflare (with Gucci Mane)	Released: July 6, 2017; Label: Famerica Records, Black Migo Gang, Cash Money; Format: Download
Plugged In With The Cartel	Released: November 27, 2017; Label: Famerica Records, Black Migo Gang, Cash Money; Format: Download
Diary of the Streets III	Released: February 9, 2018; Label: Famerica Records, Black Migo Gang, 1017 Eskimo Records, Cash Money; Format: Download
12 Can't Stop Sh*t	Released: April 28, 2018; Label: Famerica Records, Black Migo Gang, 1017 Eskimo Records, Cash Money; Format: Download
Conspiracy	Released: October 12, 2018; Label: Famerica Records; Format: Download
Free Ralo	Released: June 28, 2019; Label: Famerica Records; Format: Download
Political Prisoner	Released: September 9, 2021; Label: Famerica Records; Format: Download
97 Months	Released: April 25, 2023; Label: Famerica Records; Format: Download
