= Hyaena (song) =

2023 song by Travis Scott

Song by Travis Scott

from the album Utopia
- Released: July 28, 2023
- Recorded: 2022
- Studio: Shangri-La (California); Miraval (Correns)
- Genre: Alternative hip hop
- Length: 3:42
- Label: Cactus Jack; Epic
- Songwriters: Jacques Webster II; Ebony Oshunrinde; Michael Dean; Jahaan Sweet; Noah Goldstein; Andrew Shallcross; Derek Shulman; Ray Shulman; Kerry Minnear; George Clinton; Edward Hazel
- Producers: Travis Scott; WondaGurl (add.); Mike Dean (add.); Sweet (add.); Goldstein (add.)

"Hyaena" is a song by American rapper Travis Scott and the opening track from his fourth studio album Utopia (2023). It was produced by Scott, with additional production from WondaGurl, Mike Dean, Jahaan Sweet and Noah Goldstein. The song samples "Proclamation" by Gentle Giant and "Maggot Brain" by Funkadelic.

== Composition ==
The song opens with the sample of "Proclamation", originally performed by Gentle Giant, in the form of distorted vocals and electronic instruments, after which the instrumental transitions to a breakbeat accompanied with "hacked-up" harpsichords. Travis Scott mimics Kanye West's rapping style, while lyrically he name-drops celebrities and brags about money and various luxuries like private planes.

== Music video ==
The music video is directed by Andrew Dosunmu. (Note: Stated in the end credits of Circus Maximus.) The music video is a segment in the film Circus Maximus. Travis Scott was spotted visiting a village in the Kano State of Nigeria for the video, which consists of documentary footage of Scott and life in the village.

== Reception ==
The song received generally positive reviews from music critics. Clash's Robin Murray wrote that it "throws a curveball", describing the sample as "triggering a dramatic shift, the shuddering electronics replete with incredible detail." Tom Breihan of Stereogum praised the performance, but criticized the lyrics: "Scott really locks in with that breakbeat, hitting the pocket and displaying a casual command that I've rarely heard in him. But what he's saying is stuff like this: 'Write a show by myself like I'm Chelsea Handler / Or write a series 'bout my bitches like I'm Kelsey Grammer.'" Thomas Galindo of American Songwriter wrote that Travis Scott's "sparse use of autotune" "helps him deliver more raunchy, raw, fiery verses as he used to a decade ago", citing "Hyaena" as among the songs in which this quality is most notably displayed. Rolling Stone's Andre Gee wrote that Scott "fervently chains together end rhymes with multiple syllables and raps in interesting cadences."

In an album review, Nathan Evans of NME stated that Utopia "rivals OutKast's Stankonia for how it devours genres and settings into his world", before writing "But Scott sounds maddened by the pursuit of finding that vague world. It's reflected in how he puts himself in the throes of the quaking opener 'Hyaena'". Vivian Medithi of HipHopDX wrote a negative response, commenting it sounds like a "Huncho Jack, Jack Huncho reject". Mackenzie Cummings-Grady of Billboard placed "Hyaena" at number 6 in her ranking of the songs from Utopia.

In a Facebook post, Gentle Giant responded favorably toward the sample of their song being used: "We are honored by the inclusion of our 1974 song 'Proclamation' in the intro track to Travis Scott's new album 'Utopia.' We are always amazed how Gentle Giant's music continues to inspire and evolve across diverse genres and generations, particularly within the Hip-Hop community."

== Charts ==
Chart performance for "Hyaena"
Chart (2023)	Peak position
Australia (ARIA)	16
Australia Hip Hop/R&B (ARIA)	7
Canada Hot 100 (Billboard)	15
Czech Republic Singles Digital (ČNS IFPI)	10
Denmark (Tracklisten)	28
Finland (Suomen virallinen lista)	49
France (SNEP)	23
Global 200 (Billboard)	10
Greece International (IFPI)	26
Hungary (Single Top 40)	21
Iceland (Tónlistinn)	5
Ireland (IRMA)	19
Italy (FIMI)	36
Latvia (LaIPA)	5
Lithuania (AGATA)	20
Luxembourg (Billboard)	14
MENA (IFPI)	15
New Zealand (Recorded Music NZ)	13
Norway (VG-lista)	17
Poland (Polish Streaming Top 100)	14
Portugal (AFP)	26
Romania (Billboard)	22
South Africa (Billboard)	12
Sweden (Sverigetopplistan)	59
UK Singles (Official Charts)	21
UK Hip Hop/R&B (Official Charts)	9
US Billboard Hot 100	14
US Hot R&B/Hip-Hop Songs (Billboard)	7

== Certifications ==
Certifications for "Hyaena"
Region	Certification	Certified units/sales
Brazil (Pro-Música Brasil)	Platinum	40,000^{‡}
Canada (Music Canada)	Gold	40,000^{‡}
United States (RIAA)	Gold	500,000^{‡}
^{‡} Sales+streaming figures based on certification alone.
