= The Burrprint =

The Burrprint (The Movie 3D)

Mixtape by Gucci Mane
- Released: October 9, 2009
- Recorded: 2009
- Genre: Hip-hop
- Length: 66:13
- Label: 1017 Brick Squad Records; E1 Records (parts of the US); Aphilliates Music Group
- Producer: Zaytoven; Drumma Boy; Fatboi; Scott Storch; Jazzy Pha; Shawty Redd

Gucci Mane chronology
Guccitendo (2009)	The Burrprint (The Movie 3D) (2009)	The State vs. Radric Davis (2009)

The Burrprint (The Movie 3D) is a mixtape by American rapper Gucci Mane and hosted by DJ Drama. It was released on October 9, 2009. It is the third and final installment in his The Movie series and the first installment in his Burrprint series of mixtapes. The album features notable artists Bun B, Rocko, OJ da Juiceman, Waka Flocka Flame, Shawty Redd, and Kandi Burruss. The Burrprint peaked at number 18 on the Billboard Top Rap Album chart and number 36 on the Billboard Top Independent Albums chart. According to an interview with MTV News, DJ Drama stated that the mixtape originated from the desire to produce an improved version of Gucci Mane's previous mixtape, The Movie: Part 2 (The Sequel), which, according to him, "didn't do what we felt it should've done".

== Critical reception ==
Professional ratings
Review scores
Source	Rating
Pitchfork	4/5 stars

The mixtape was met with positive reviews from music critics. Tom Breihan of Pitchfork noted, "He's found his audience by elevating ignorance to expertly absurdist art, thus making his 2009 a worthy successor to Cam'ron's 2004 or Lil Wayne's 2005. He's been on a very, very serious roll."

== Track listing ==
No.	Title	Producer(s)	Length
1.	"Intro"		0:25
2.	"Dope Boys"	Shawty Redd	4:16
3.	"Frowney Face"	Zaytoven	4:33
4.	"Watch Cost A Bentley" (featuring Bun B and Rocko)	Drumma Boy	3:54
5.	"Think I Want Her"	Zaytoven	4:23
6.	"Gucci Speaks"		0:25
7.	"Yelp, I Got All Of That"	Drumma Boy	4:38
8.	"Trap Goin' Crazy"	Paulin Jardim	4:06
9.	"My Shadow"	Drumma Boy	4:05
10.	"Gucci Speaks"		0:53
11.	"Real As They Get" (featuring OJ da Juiceman and Waka Flocka Flame)		3:21
12.	"Excuse Me"	Zaytoven	3:57
13.	"More" (featuring Kandi and Sean Ceasar)	Drumma Boy	4:13
14.	"Gucci Speaks"		0:36
15.	"Candy Lady"	Nitti	1:25
16.	"Candy Lady (Remix)" (featuring Brick Squad)	Nitti	3:59
17.	"No No No"		4:14
18.	"Foreign" (featuring Shawty Redd)	Shawty Redd	4:30
19.	"Flexin" (featuring Brick Squad)	Mike da Rockman	4:05
20.	"My Chain" (featuring Brick Squad)	Nitti	4:13
Total length:			66:13

== Charts ==
Chart (2009)	Peak position
US Top Rap Albums (Billboard)	18
US Independent Albums (Billboard)	36
