= Jev. =

Congolese-Canadian rapper (born 2000)

jev.
- Born: Jephté Kewto; May 9, 2000 (age 26); Democratic Republic of the Congo
- Education: Carleton University
- Genres: Alternative hip-hop; chipmunk soul; jazz rap
- Occupation: Rapper
- Years active: 2015–present
- Labels: Loner, inc.
- Website: www.thelonerjev.com

Jephté Kewto (born May 9, 2000), also known as jev., is a Congolese-Canadian rapper. A refugee, he went viral on TikTok for his 2022 single "where's the confetti", which preceded his first studio album the color grey. In 2024, he released his second album, when angels cry. jev. is known for his intricate wordplay and production style that fuses old and new-school hip hop.

== Early life ==
Jephté Kewto was born on May 9, 2000, in the Democratic Republic of the Congo. He spent some time there before fleeing to South Africa as a refugee. He later moved again to Canada in late 2019.

jev. had been performing music since he was nine years old and he began writing and producing his own songs when he was twelve. He began using the name "jev." in 2015. Before releasing his first studio album, he worked at Staples.

== Career ==
jev. began receiving attention online when he released the song "where's the confetti", which went viral on TikTok in 2022. That song was the lead single to his first studio album, the color grey., released on December 20, 2022. The release of the album led him to quit his job and pursue music full-time. jev. released his first extended play, Lonerwrld, vol 1, on September 22, 2023. He also supported Lil Tjay on his Beat The Odds Tour in 2023 as an opening act. While making music, he is also studying marketing at Carleton University in Ottawa.

== Influences and artistry ==
jev. has stated that he was influenced by the rappers Kendrick Lamar, Joey Badass, J. Cole, André 3000, Jay-Z, Lil Wayne, the Fugees, Wu-Tang Clan, Lost Boyz, and Nas. He is known for his dynamic delivery, intricate wordplay, and flexible flows. Many of the beats he raps on are a mix of chipmunk soul and boom bap and mixes both old and new-school styles.

jev. enjoys reading books and writing, and many of the metaphors and hidden meanings in his lyrics display that. Due to his upbringing, he has encountered many places that have different takes on music, with more emphasis being placed on the instrumentation than the lyrics. Because of this, he puts just the same focus on the beat of a song as he does with the lyrics.

== Discography ==
=== Studio albums ===
Title	Details
the color grey.	Released: December 20, 2022; Label: Loner, inc.; Formats: Digital download, LP, CD
when angels cry	Released: June 14, 2024; Label: Loner, inc.; Formats: Digital download, LP, CD
LONERWRLD, vol 2	Released: September 30, 2025; Label: Loner, inc.; Formats: Digital download, LP, CD

=== Extended plays ===
Title	Details
Lonerwrld, vol 1	Released: September 22, 2023; Label: Loner, inc.; Formats: Digital download

=== Singles ===
Title	Year	Album
"Diamond Rose"	2019	Non-album single
"What You Mad For?"	2020	Non-album single
"Won't Say"	2020	Non-album single
"Matrix"	2020	Non-album single
"Aftermath"	2020	Non-album single
"Jays (Session '17)"	2021	Non-album single
"Elegance"	2021	Non-album single
"h o p e"	2021	Non-album single
"what a life."	2022	Non-album single
"where's the confetti?"	2022	the color grey.
"lonrwrld (freestlyle)"	2023	Lonerwrld, vol 1
"who?"	2023	Lonerwrld, vol 1
"Lucky 9" (with Bailey Daniel)	2023	Lonerwrld, vol 1
"Hood Musical"	2023	Non-album single
"9AM in London"	2023	Non-album single
"Down For Us."	2024	Non-album single
"vintage."	2024	Non-album single
"Famous"	2024	when angels cry
"The Samurai's Monologue."	2024	when angels cry
"You Cry Love."	2024	Non-album single
"Young Saiyan Freestyle"	2024	Non-album single
"Hold My Liquor"	2025	Non-album single
"Marvin Gaye."	2025	Non-album single
"The Purple One."	2025	Non-album single
"GOD flow."	2026	
