= Yung Mal =

American rapper

- Also known as: Yung Mal
- Born: Jamal Micheal Braud; August 12, 1999 (age 26); New Orleans, Louisiana, U.S.
- Origin: East Atlanta, Atlanta, Georgia, U.S.
- Genres: Hip hop; trap
- Occupations: Rapper; singer; songwriter
- Years active: 2015–present
- Label: Alamo • Sony Music •1.5 (Current) • 1017 Eskimo (Former)

Jamal Michael Braud better known as Yung Mal is an American rapper, singer, and songwriter.

== Early life ==
Mal was born in New Orleans and later moved to East Atlanta, Georgia. He began his music career writing bars to popular beats, before he was persuaded to create his own craft by friends. Mal was recording his own tracks casually from the age of 13 before he took music seriously in the late 2010s, then after his 2016 single, "Str8 Out Da Pot," he found underground success online. Mal Teamed up with his close friend Lil Quill and the duo started their professional career by releasing debut mixtapes Blessed Lil Bastards and Blessed Lil Bastards 2 in April and May 2017. And they both caught Gucci Mane's attention with their EP titled Kids of the 6. In July 2021, Mal was arrested and charged with murder.

== Career ==
In 2016, Mal released a single titled "Str8 Out Da Pot" which brought him to the limelight.

In 2017, Mal was signed to Gucci Mane, the same year he and Lil Quil released their third mixtape titled Came from Zero and an EP titled Kids of the 6.

In December 2018, Mal together with Lil Quil released their fourth mixtape titled Lil Bastards 3, produced mainly by Gudda Tay.

In August 2019, He released his debut album titled Iceburg, and collaborated with top artists like Gunna, Pi'erre Bourne, and Gucci Mane.

In 2020, Mal released another project titled 6 Rings, where he features Lil Quill, Lil Keed, Lil Gotit and Doe Boy. Also working along with Baltimore producer Pyrex Whippa. Same year he released an EP titled Iceberg Sosa.

In January 2022, Mal released the single "Gah Damn".

== Discography ==
=== EP's ===
- Kids of the 6 (2016)
- Iceberg Sosa (2020)

=== Albums ===
- Iceburg (2019)
- 6 Rings (2020)
- 1.5 Way Or No Way (2021)
- Iceburg Where You Been (2023)
