= Hotboy Wes =

American rapper (born c.1995)

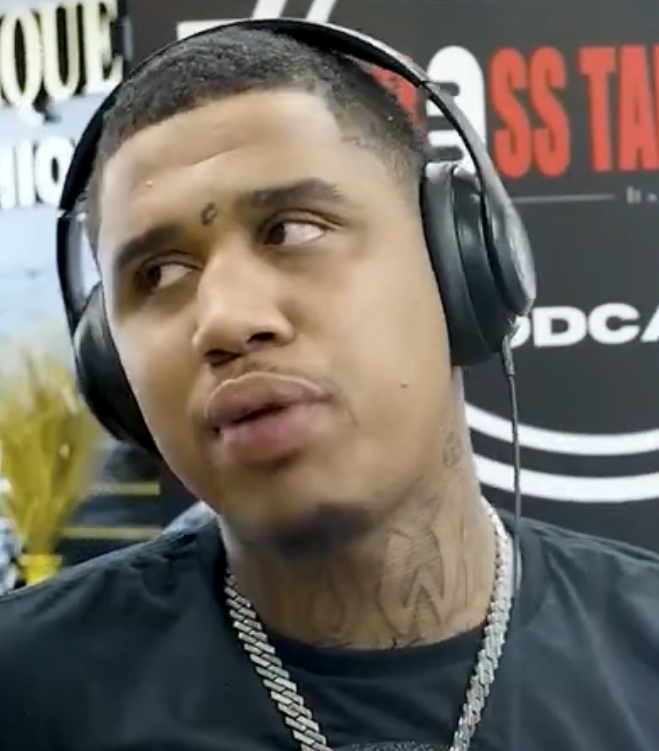
- Lewis in 2023

Background information
- Born: Wesley Takquan Lewis c. 1995 (age 30–31); Waco, Texas, US
- Genre: Southern hip hop
- Instrument: Vocals
- Website: hotboywesmusic.com

Wesley Takquan Lewis (born c. 1995) better known by his stage name Hotboy Wes, is an American rapper.

== Early life and career ==
Wesley Takquan Lewis was born c. 1995 in Waco, Texas. In 2019, he released the mixtape Never Had Shit. On July 3 or 4, 2021, he was signed to Gucci Mane's 1017 Records, and was gifted a 1017 necklace from Gucci Mane. He featured on Lewis' song "My Little Dance". He was also featured on the So Icy Boyz compilation album.

== Legal issues ==
Lewis is a Crip. In 2020, he was accused of running the vehicle of the mother of his children off the road, while the children were in the car.

On January 31, 2022, Lewis was arrested by the United States Marshals Service Lone Star Fugitive Task Force, on a warrant of a stolen firearm. He was held on US$30,000 bail.

In January 2024, Lewis was indicted for violence against the mothers of his children. He was sentenced to 15 years in prison, on 10 counts.

== Discography ==
- Left For Dead, Vol.1 (2023)
- Never Had Shit (2019)
