= Foogiano =

American rapper (born 1993)

- Born: Kwame Khalil Brown; July 4, 1993 (age 33); Greensboro, Georgia, U.S.
- Genre: Hip hop
- Occupations: Rapper; songwriter
- Years active: 2014–present
- Labels: Atlantic; 1017

Kwame Khalil Brown (born July 4, 1993), better known by his stage name Foogiano, is an American rapper. He signed with Gucci Mane's record label 1017 Records in 2020, and is best known for his single "Molly (Baby Mama)" (remixed featuring DaBaby), which released in May of that year. His debut studio album, Gutta Baby (2020) was released the following November.

== Early life and career ==
Brown was born in Greensboro, Georgia. He gained recognition for his single "Molly", which spawned a remix featuring North Carolina–based rapper DaBaby in September 2020. After signing with Gucci Mane's 1017 Records, he released his debut studio album, Gutta Baby, on November 26, 2020. It debuted atop Billboard's Heatseekers Albums chart.

He grew up listening to T.I., Lil Wayne and Gucci Mane. His favorite rapper is Drake.

== Legal issues ==
In 2013, Brown was arrested on burglary and robbery charges and was sentenced in 2014, serving three years in jail before getting out.

In September 2020, Brown and label CEO Gucci Mane were named in a wrongful death lawsuit stemming from a shooting that occurred in July of that year, which left two people dead.

In December 2020, Brown was arrested for possession of a firearm by a convicted felon. On a December 14 hearing, a judge set his bail at $50,000, with the requirements that he wear an ankle monitor and stay inside the state of Georgia. However, Brown burned off his ankle monitor, leading to a warrant being issued for his arrest. In March 2021, Brown was arrested by federal agents in Memphis, Tennessee, after being on the run for three months. In May 2021, Brown was sentenced to five years in prison on charges related to his previous charges. He was subsequently released in 2026.

== Personal life ==
Brown was in a relationship with fellow rapper, Renni Rucci.

== Discography ==
=== Studio albums ===
Title	Album details	Peak chart positions
Title	Album details	US Heat.
Gutta Baby	Released: November 26, 2020; Label: 1017, Atlantic; Format: Digital download, streaming	1

=== Compilation albums ===
Title	Album details	Peak chart positions		
Title	Album details	US	US R&B/HH	US Rap
So Icy Summer (with 1017)	Released: July 3, 2020; Label: GUWOP, Atlantic; Format: Digital download, streaming	29	19	19
So Icy Gang, Vol. 1 (with 1017)	Released: October 16, 2020; Label: GUWOP, Atlantic; Format: Digital download, streaming	46	26	25
So Icy Boyz (with 1017)	Released: October 15, 2021; Label: 1017, Atlantic; Format: Digital download, streaming	42	22	21
So Icy Gang: The ReUp (with 1017)	Released: June 17, 2022; Label: 1017, Atlantic; Format: Digital download, streaming	39	19	14
So Icy Boyz 22 (with 1017)	Released: October 17, 2022; Label: 1017, Atlantic; Format: Digital download, streaming	—	—	—
So Icy Boyz: The Finale (with 1017)	Released: December 9, 2022; Label: 1017, Atlantic; Format: Digital download, streaming	—	—	—

=== Mixtapes ===
Title	Mixtape details
Gutta Baby	Released: November 26, 2020; Label: Self-released; Format: Digital download, streaming
The Mayor	Released: March 23, 2018; Label: Self-released; Format: Digital download, streaming
Gutta Baby 2	Released: September 5, 2018; Label: Self-released; Format: Digital download, streaming
Gutta Baby	Released: October 9, 2019; Label: Self-released; Format: Digital download, streaming
Backwood Boyz (with Geezy Escobar)	Released: April 20, 2021; Label: Authentic Empire; Format: Digital download, streaming

=== Singles ===
==== As lead artist ====
Title	Year	Certifications	Album
"Trapper" (solo or remix featuring Lil Baby)	2020		Gutta Baby 3, So Icy Summer and Gutta Baby
"Molly" (solo or remix featuring DaBaby)	2020	RIAA: Platinum	Gutta Baby 3, So Icy Summer and Gutta Baby
"Stick Man" (with Geezy Escobar)	2020		Backwood Boyz
"Yano"	2020		Gutta Baby
"First Day in LA" (featuring Pooh Shiesty)	2020		Gutta Baby
"Free Foo"	2021		So Icy Boyz
"Dead in Miami"	2021		So Icy Boyz (Deluxe)

==== As featured artist ====
Title	Year	Peak chart positions				Certifications	Album
Title	Year	US Tril.	US Main. R&B/HH	US Rap Air.	US R&B/HH Air.	Certifications	Album
"Hittin' (Remix)" (Money Mu featuring Moneybagg Yo and Foogiano)	2020	—	18	23	30		Non-album single
"SoIcyBoyz 2" (Big Scarr featuring Pooh Shiesty, Tay Keith and Foogiano)	2020	13	—	—	—	RIAA: Gold	So Icy Gang, Vol. 1 and Big Grim Reaper

=== Guest appearances ===
Title	Year	Other artist(s)	Album
"Take a Life"	2021	Pooh Shiesty	Shiesty Season
