= 1017 Records =

Record label

1017 Global Music, LLC
- Parent company: Warner Music Group
- Founded: 2007
- Founder: Gucci Mane
- Distributor: Atlantic
- Genre: Hip-hop; trap
- Location: Atlanta, Georgia, U.S.
- Official website: thenew1017records.com

1017 Global Music, LLC, also known as The New 1017 Records (formerly known as 1017 Brick Squad, So Icey Entertainment, and 1017 Eskimo, briefly GUWOP Enterprises), is an American record label founded by Gucci Mane in 2007. Its formation followed his departure from Mizay Entertainment and the dissolution of So Icey. The label has signed mainly Atlanta-based hip-hop recording artists, such as Young Thug, Waka Flocka Flame, Pooh Shiesty and OJ da Juiceman, among others.

== History ==
=== 2007–2013 ===
In 2007, Gucci Mane founded his first independent record label, So Icey Entertainment, after signing with Mizay Entertainment. Soon after Gucci released his independent album, Trap-A-Thon.

From 2007 to 2009, So Icey Entertainment released a multitude of mixtapes for regional artists. During this period, Gucci Mane had many affiliates who weren't officially signed to his label. On May 4, 2010, he announced that he was closing So Icey Entertainment and leaving Mizay Entertainment due to business concerns with Debra Antney. Gucci Mane then stated that he was starting his own record label, 1017 Brick Squad. OJ Da Juiceman, Waka Flocka Flame were the first artists signed to 1017 Brick Squad.

Juiceman's debut album was unofficially released through the 1017 Brick Squad record label (it was officially released through Asylum Records and Mizay Entertainment). The first mainstream success for 1017 Brick Squad occurred in 2009, when Gucci released The State vs. Radric Davis.

In 2010, Brick Squad artist Waka Flocka Flame released his debut album, Flockaveli, through Brick Squad, Mizay Entertainment, and Warner Bros.

On September 28, 2010, Gucci Mane released his seventh studio album, The Appeal: Georgia's Most Wanted.

On December 16, 2011, while preparing for a music video at an Atlanta recording studio, Brick Squad artist Slim Dunkin was shot and killed while arguing with another person in the building, later identified as Atlanta rapper Young Vito. On February 25, 2013, Young Vito was acquitted of murdering Slim Dunkin, but he was given a 25-year sentence for aggravated assault and possession of a firearm.

=== 2013–2016 ===
On March 15, 2013, via Twitter, Gucci Mane tweeted that he "dropped" Waka Flocka Flame and that Waka was no longer a member of 1017 Brick Squad.

The next day, Gucci's management claimed his Twitter account was hacked and he did not send the tweet about Waka Flocka.

However, Waka would claim this to be false and later diss Gucci Mane at a Dipset reunion concert in New York City. On March 27, 2013, Waka told MTV that it would be impossible for him to be dropped from 1017 Brick Squad as he owns stake in the company. He also confirmed that there was indeed a feud going on between the rappers and "they would never make music or do business together again."

On September 7, 2013, various members of 1017 Brick Squad and Brick Squad Monopoly argued back and forth on Twitter. This was the culmination of a label-wide communication breakdown and spawned Brick Squad Mafia, the label run by Mack Drama which is where Frenchie, along with a multitude of other Brick Squad Artists, first ended up after splitting from the primary group.

Gucci Mane would go on to say "fuck brick squad" and accuse his former manager, Waka Flocka's mom Debra Antney, of stealing money from OJ da Juiceman and Frenchie. Frenchie also accused Gucci Mane of paying for Young Vito's lawyer, the accused murderer of former 1017 Brick Squad artist Slim Dunkin, which Gucci denied. Then Frenchie released a diss record toward Gucci the following day.

=== 2016–present ===
Upon Gucci Mane's latest release from incarceration, he created a new record label, 1017 Eskimo, a partnership venture with Alamo/Empire Distribution. Artists signed to 1017 Eskimo included Hoodrich Pablo Juan and Lil Wop. In 2020, Gucci rebranded his label as 1017 Global / The New 1017, and partnered up with Atlantic to distribute music for his signees. Gucci Mane has a net worth over 100 million dollars generated and he put his money into his label. He then released a compilation album called Gucci Mane Presents: So Icy Summer in July 2020 introducing his artists. He and his label mates released So Icy Gang Vol. 1 in October 2020.

Since rebranding as The New 1017, many of his artists have since been dropped from the label, died, or have been incarcerated.

In 2022, Gucci Mane signed an artist named Baby Racks and dropped him the next day, after the artist made an "inappropriate remark" upon the shooting death of Atlanta rapper Takeoff.

In November 2024, Gucci Mane announced that he was dropping all artists from his label except for Pooh Shiesty and Foogiano.

== Notable artists ==
=== Current (The New 1017) artists ===
- Foogiano
- Gucci Mane
- Pooh Shiesty

=== Former ===
As 1017 Global/(The New 1017):

- Enchanting (deceased)
- Big Scarr (deceased)
- Hotboy Wes
- BigWalkDog
- K Shiday
- 1017 Sett
- Bic Fizzle
- Brezden
- TLE Chinco

As 1017 Brick Squad:

- Waka Flocka Flame
- OJ da Juiceman
- Zaytoven (producer)
- Slim Dunkin (deceased)
- Frenchie
- Wooh Da Kid
- Mack Drama
- Young Thug
- Rich Homie Quan (deceased)
- Future
- Nicki Minaj
- Young Dolph (deceased)
- Young Scooter (deceased)
- OG Boo Dirty
- Peewee Longway
- Chief Keef
- Mike Will Made It
- Southside (producer)
- Migos

As 1017 Eskimo:

- Yung Mal
- Lil Wop
- Asian Doll
- Hoodrich Pablo Juan

Pre‑label affiliates (2007–2009):

- Kebo Gotti
- Shawty Lo (deceased)
- Rocko
- Yo Gotti
- 2 Chainz

== Discography ==
=== Studio albums ===
So Icey Entertainment

| Title | Album details | Peak chart positions | | | Sales figures |
| Title | Album details | US | US R&B/HH | US Rap | Sales figures |
|---|---|---|---|---|---|
| Back to the Trap House (Gucci Mane) | Released: December 11, 2007 | 57 | 11 | 6 | US: 32,000 |
| The Otha Side of the Trap (OJ da Juiceman) | Released: January 27, 2009 | — (Note: The Otha Side of the Trap did not enter the Billboard 200 chart, but peaked at number 12 on the US Heatseekers Albums chart.) | 32 | 9 | |

1017 Brick Squad

| Title | Album details | Peak chart positions | | | Sales figures | Certifications |
| Title | Album details | US | US R&B/HH | US Rap | Sales figures | Certifications |
|---|---|---|---|---|---|---|
| The State vs. Radric Davis (Gucci Mane) | Released: December 8, 2009 | 10 | 4 | 1 | US: 90,000 | RIAA: Gold |
| The Appeal: Georgia's Most Wanted (Gucci Mane) | Released: September 28, 2010 | 4 | 2 | 2 | US: 50,000 | |
| Flockaveli (Waka Flocka Flame) | Released: October 5, 2010 | 6 | 2 | 2 | US: 37,000 | |
| The Return of Mr. Zone 6 (Gucci Mane) | Released: March 22, 2011 | 18 | 8 | 2 | US: 22,045 | |
| Triple F Life: Friends, Fans & Family (Waka Flocka Flame) | Released: June 12, 2012 | 10 | 2 | 1 | US: 33,000 | |
| Trap House III (Gucci Mane) | Released: May 21, 2013 | 88 | 16 | 9 | US: 2,500 | |
| The State vs. Radric Davis II: The Caged Bird Sings (Gucci Mane) | Released: December 25, 2013 | — | 31 | — | | |
| Trap God 3 (Gucci Mane) | Released: October 17, 2014 | — | — | — | | |
| The Otis Williams Jr. Story (OJ da Juiceman) | Released: December 5, 2014 | — | — | — | | |
| 1017 Mafia: Incarcerated (Gucci Mane) | Released: January 3, 2015 | — | 47 | — | | |
| Breakfast (Gucci Mane) | Released: March 18, 2015 | — | — | — | | |
| Lunch (Gucci Mane) | Released: March 18, 2015 | — | — | — | | |
| Dinner (Gucci Mane) | Released: March 18, 2015 | — | — | — | | |

1017 Records

| Title | Album details | Peak chart positions | | | Sales figures | Certifications | |
| Title | Album details | US | US R&B/HH | US Rap | Sales figures | Certifications | |
|---|---|---|---|---|---|---|---|
| Iceburg (Yung Mal) | Released: August 28, 2019 | — | — | — | | | |
| DMV (Hoodrich Pablo Juan) | Released: November 1, 2019 | — | — | — | | | |
| East Atlanta Santa 3 (Gucci Mane) | Released: December 20, 2019 | 68 | 27 | 19 | | | |
| Gutta Baby (Foogiano) | Released: November 26, 2020 | — (Note: Gutta Baby did not enter the Billboard 200 chart, but peaked at number one on the US Heatseekers Albums chart.) | — | — | | | |
| Ice Daddy (Gucci Mane) | Released: June 18, 2021 | 34 | 18 | 14 | | | — |

=== Collaborative albums ===
| Title | Album details | Peak chart positions | | | Sales figures |
| Title | Album details | US | US R&B/HH | US Rap | Sales figures |
|---|---|---|---|---|---|
| Ferrari Boyz (Gucci Mane and Waka Flocka Flame) | Released: August 9, 2011 | 20 | 5 | 4 | US: 17,000 |
| BAYTL (Gucci Mane and V-Nasty) | Released: December 13, 2011 | 198 | 29 | 16 | US: 4,449 |

=== Compilation albums ===
1017 Brick Squad

| Title | Album details |
|---|---|
| Bricksquad Mafia (with Gucci Mane) | Released: February 5, 2011 |
| Bricksquad Is the Army Better Yet the Navy | Released: April 12, 2011 |

1017 Records

| Title | Album details | Peak chart positions | | |
| Title | Album details | US | US R&B/HH | US Rap |
|---|---|---|---|---|
| So Icy Gang, Vol. 1 (with Gucci Mane) | Released: October 16, 2020 | 46 | 26 | 25 |
| So Icy Boyz (with Gucci Mane) | Released: October 15, 2021 | 42 | 22 | 21 |
| So Icy Christmas (with Gucci Mane) | Released: December 17, 2021 | — | — | — |
| So Icy Gang: The ReUp (with Gucci Mane) | Released: June 17, 2022 | 39 | 19 | 14 |
| So Icy Boyz 22 (with Gucci Mane) | Released: October 17, 2022 | — | — | — |
| So Icy Boyz: The Finale (with Gucci Mane) | Released: December 9, 2022 | — | — | — |

=== Mixtapes ===
So Icey Entertainment

| Title | Album details | Peak chart positions | |
| Title | Album details | US R&B/HH | US Rap |
|---|---|---|---|
| No Pad, No Pencil (Gucci Mane) | Released: November 10, 2007 | 86 | — |
| The Burrprint (The Movie 3D) (Gucci Mane) | Released: October 10, 2009 | — | 18 |

1017 Brick Squad

| Title | Album details | Peak chart positions | | | Sales figures |
| Title | Album details | US | US R&B/HH | US Rap | Sales figures |
|---|---|---|---|---|---|
| Burrrprint (2) HD (Gucci Mane) | Released: March 13, 2010 | 19 | 6 | 2 | US: 19,000 |
| Trap God (Gucci Mane) | Released: October 17, 2012 | — | 33 | 25 | |
| Trap God 2 (Gucci Mane) | Released: February 12, 2013 | — | 34 | 20 | US: 2,900 |
| World War 3: Molly (Gucci Mane, Metro Boomin, Sonny Digital and Dun Deal) | Released: August 13, 2013 | — | 45 | — | |
| World War 3: Gas (Gucci Mane and 808 Mafia) | Released: August 13, 2013 | — | 32 | 18 | |
| World War 3: Lean (Gucci Mane, Zaytoven, Honorable C.N.O.T.E. and Mike Will Made It) | Released: August 13, 2013 | — | 33 | 19 | |
| Brick Factory Vol. 1 (Gucci Mane) | Released: May 26, 2014 | — | 39 | 22 | |
| Trap House 4 (Gucci Mane) | Released: July 4, 2014 | 153 | 27 | 15 | |
| The Oddfather (Gucci Mane) | Released: July 28, 2014 | — | 29 | 15 | |

1017 Records

| Title | Mixtape details | Peak chart positions | | | Sales figures | Certifications |
| Title | Mixtape details | US | US R&B/HH | US Rap | Sales figures | Certifications |
|---|---|---|---|---|---|---|
| Shiesty Season (Pooh Shiesty) | Released: February 5, 2021 | 3 | 2 | 1 | US: 62,000 | RIAA: Platinum |
| Big Grim Reaper (Big Scarr) | Released: April 16, 2021 | 25 | 14 | 12 | US: 22,000 | |
| Trick City (BigWalkDog) | Released: September 23, 2022 | 125 | — | — | | |
