= Big Scarr =

American rapper (2000–2022)

- Big Scarr in 2021

Background information
- Born: Alexander Woods; April 7, 2000; Memphis, Tennessee, U.S.
- Died: December 22, 2022 (aged 22) Memphis, Tennessee, U.S.
- Genres: Southern hip hop; drill; trap
- Occupations: Rapper; songwriter
- Years active: 2019–2022
- Labels: Atlantic; 1017
- Website: www.bigscarrmusic.com

Alexander Woods (April 7, 2000 – December 22, 2022), better known by his stage name Big Scarr, was an American rapper from Memphis, Tennessee. He signed with Gucci Mane's 1017 Records in 2020, and released his single "SoIcyBoyz" (featuring Pooh Shiesty, Foogiano, and Tay Keith) in June of that year. His debut mixtape, Big Grim Reaper (2021) peaked at number 25 on the Billboard 200 and was met with positive reception.

== Early life ==
Woods was born on April 7, 2000, and grew up in the Magnolia community of South Memphis, Tennessee. He was one of nine children, and he lived with his grandmother until her death when he was 13. He was injured in a car accident at 16 that left scars on his face, which inspired his stage name of "Big Scarr".

== Career ==
Woods initially didn't have a passion for rap music and started gaining interest due to his friend and fellow artist Baby K. In 2019, he released his first track "Make a Play" which received 50,000 views on YouTube. He recalls spending $20 to record his first song and $200 to record the music video. In 2020, he signed to American rapper Gucci Mane's record label 1017 Records under Atlantic Records. In 2021, he released "SoIcyBoyz" featuring his cousin Pooh Shiesty and American rapper Foogiano. He released two other installments in the series, titled "SoIcyBoyz 2" and "SoIcyBoyz 3". The second and third installments include a feature from producer Tay Keith, whilst the third installment features Gucci Mane.

Big Scarr's debut mixtape, Big Grim Reaper, was released on April 16, 2021, and peaked at number 25 on the Billboard 200, selling 22,000 copies in its first week. This earned Woods his first charting project. The mixtape included appearances from rappers Gucci Mane, Pooh Shiesty, Foogiano, Tay Keith, Enchanting, and Baby K. In February 2022, he released the deluxe of his mixtape Big Grim Reaper titled Big Grim Reaper: The Return with appearances from rappers Offset, Gucci Mane, and Queez Ruthless. In June 2022, he was selected as part of the 2022 XXL Freshman class where he performed his freestyle in a cypher alongside rappers Nardo Wick, KenTheMan, and Big30. In December 2022, Woods was announced as a special guest on American rapper Key Glock's Glockoma Tour.

== Musical style ==
Big Scarr cited his influences as rappers, Kodak Black and Boosie Badazz. He also mentions being a fan of American rapper Rod Wave during an interview with Revolt TV. Big Scarr said his lyrics were created spontaneously using a technique known as "punching in", as opposed to using written lyrics. Steve Juon of Rap Reviews compared Big Scarr's style to that of Freddie Gibbs.

== Personal life and death ==
In 2020, Woods was shot in the hip, with the bullet traveling to his spine. This necessitated an appendectomy and the realignment of his leg.

According to Woods' family, he died on December 22, 2022, from an accidental prescription drug overdose at his girlfriend's house. He was 22 years old.

== Discography ==
- The Secret Weapon (2023)
- Frozone (2023)
