= 2021 BET Hip Hop Awards =

Annual edition of the awards show

- Date: October 5, 2021
- Most wins: Cardi B; Tyler, the Creator; (3)
- Most nominations: Cardi B; Lil Durk; (9)

The 2021 BET Hip Hop Awards is a recognition ceremony that was held on October 5, 2021 as the 16th installment of the BET Hip Hop Awards. The nominations were announced on September 9, 2021.

Cardi B and Lil Durk lead in nominations, all with 9 nominations each, followed by Drake with 8. American rapper and producer Tyler, the Creator was recognized with the first-ever Cultural Influence Award, and american rapper Nelly was honored with the I Am Hip Hop Award.

Cardi B and Tyler, the Creator share the most wins with 3 awards each.

== Nominees ==
bold means the artist won. Non-bold means the nominations.

=== Hip Hop Artist of the Year ===
- **Lil Baby**
  - Cardi B
  - Drake
  - J. Cole
  - Megan Thee Stallion
  - Tyler, The Creator

=== Hip Hop Album of the Year ===
- **Tyler, The Creator - Call Me If You Get Lost**
  - Moneybagg Yo – A Gangsta's Pain
  - Migos – Culture III
  - Megan Thee Stallion – Good News
  - DJ Khaled – Khaled Khaled
  - 21 Savage & Metro Boomin – Savage Mode II
  - J. Cole – The Off-Season

=== Best Hip Hop Video ===
- **Cardi B featuring Megan Thee Stallion – "WAP"**
  - Cardi B – "Up"
  - Chris Brown & Young Thug – "Go Crazy"
  - Drake featuring Lil Durk – "Laugh Now Cry Later"
  - Lil Nas X – "Montero (Call Me by Your Name)"
  - Saweetie featuring Doja Cat – "Best Friend"

=== Best Collaboration ===
- **Cardi B featuring Megan Thee Stallion – "WAP"**
  - 21 Savage & Metro Boomin featuring Drake – "Mr. Right Now"
  - Bia featuring Nicki Minaj – "Whole Lotta Money (Remix)"
  - DJ Khaled featuring Lil Baby & Lil Durk – "Every Chance I Get"
  - Drake featuring Lil Durk – "Laugh Now Cry Later"
  - Pooh Shiesty featuring Lil Durk – "Back in Blood"

=== Best Duo/Group ===
- **Lil Baby & Lil Durk**
  - 21 Savage & Metro Boomin
  - Chris Brown & Young Thug
  - City Girls
  - Future & Drake
  - Migos

=== Best Live Performer ===
- **Tyler, The Creator**
  - Busta Rhymes
  - Cardi B
  - DaBaby
  - Doja Cat
  - Megan Thee Stallion

=== Lyricist of the Year ===
- **J. Cole**
  - Benny the Butcher
  - Drake
  - Lil Baby
  - Megan Thee Stallion
  - Nas

=== Video Director of the Year ===
- **Missy Elliott**
  - Cole Bennett
  - Colin Tilley
  - Dave Meyers
  - Director X
  - Hype Williams

=== DJ of the Year ===
- **DJ Scheme**
  - Chase B
  - D-Nice
  - DJ Cassidy
  - DJ Drama
  - DJ Envy
  - DJ Jazzy Jeff
  - Kaytranada

=== Producer of the Year ===
- **Hit-Boy**
  - DJ Khaled
  - Metro Boomin
  - Mustard
  - The Alchemist
  - Tyler, the Creator

=== Song of the Year ===
- **"WAP" – Produced by Ayo the Producer & Keyz (Cardi B featuring Megan Thee Stallion)**
  - "Back in Blood" – Produced by YC (Pooh Shiesty featuring Lil Durk)
  - "Late at Night" – Produced by Mustard (Roddy Ricch)
  - "Laugh Now Cry Later" – Produced by G. Ry, CardoGotWings, Rogét Chahayed, & Yung Exclusive (Drake featuring Lil Durk)
  - "Up" – Produced by Yung DZA, Sean Island, DJ Swanqo (Cardi B)

=== Best New Hip Hop Artist ===
- **Yung Bleu**
  - Don Toliver
  - Morray
  - Pooh Shiesty

=== Hustler of the Year ===
- **Saweetie**
  - Cardi B
  - Drake
  - Lil Baby
  - Megan Thee Stallion
  - Yung Bleu

=== Sweet 16: Best Featured Verse ===
- **JAY-Z – "What It Feels Like" (Nipsey Hussle & JAY-Z)**
  - Cardi B – "Type Shit (Migos)
  - Drake – "Having Our Way" (Migos)
  - Lil Durk – "Back in Blood" (Pooh Shiesty)
  - Megan Thee Stallion – "On Me (Remix)" (Lil Baby)
  - Roddy Ricch – "Lemonade (Remix)" (Internet Money)

=== Impact Track ===
- **Nipsey Hussle & JAY-Z – "What It Feels Like"**
  - Black Thought – "Thought Vs. Everybody"
  - Lil Nas X – "Montero (Call Me by Your Name)"
  - Lil Baby & Kirk Franklin – "We Win"
  - Meek Mill featuring Lil Durk – "Pain Away"
  - Nipsey Hussle & JAY-Z – "What It Feels Like"
  - Rapsody – "12 Problems"

=== Best International Flow ===
- **Little Simz (United Kingdom)**
  - Ladipoe (Nigeria)
  - Nasty C (South Africa)
  - Xamã (Brazil)
  - Laylow (France)
  - Gazo (France)

=== Best Hip-Hop Platform ===
- **Genius**
  - Complex
  - HipHopDX
  - HotNewHipHop
  - The Breakfast Club
  - The Shade Room
  - WorldStarHipHop
  - XXL

=== I Am Hip-Hop Award ===
- **Nelly**

=== Cultural Influence Award ===
- **Tyler, the Creator**

== Performers ==
List of performers at the 2021 BET Hip Hop Awards
Artist(s)	Song(s)
Young Thug Gunna	"Tick Tock" "Too Easy" "Ski"
Bia Lil Jon	"Whole Lotta Money" "Bia Bia"
Baby Keem	"Family Ties"
Latto	"Soufside" "Big Energy"
Tobe Nwigwe Fat & Nel	"Fye Fye"
Isaiah Rashad Kal Banx Doechii	"Wat U Sed" "From the Garden"
Nelly Jermaine Dupri Paul Wall City Spud	"E.I." "Country Grammar (Hot Shit)" "Air Force Ones" "Where the Party At" "Grillz" "Ride wit Me" "Dilemma" "Flap Your Wings" "Hot in Herre"

== Presenters ==
- Trina – presented Best New Hip Hop Artist
- Remy Ma – presented Best Hip Hop Video
- LL Cool J – presented Cultural Influence Award
- Rapsody – presented Hip Hop Album of the Year
- Jermaine Dupri – presented I Am Hip Hop Award
