= List of Billboard number-one R&B/hip-hop albums of 2021 =

This page lists the albums that reached number-one on the overall Top R&B/Hip-Hop Albums chart, the R&B Albums chart (which was re-created in 2013), and the Rap Albums chart in 2021. The R&B Albums and Rap Albums charts partly serve as distillations of the overall R&B/Hip-Hop Albums chart.

== List of number ones ==
Key
†	Indicates best-performing album of 2021

Issue date	R&B/Hip-Hop Albums	Artist(s)	R&B Albums	Artist(s)	Rap Albums	Artist(s)	Refs.
January 2	Music to Be Murdered By	Eminem	Merry Christmas	Mariah Carey	Music to Be Murdered By	Eminem	
January 9	Whole Lotta Red	Playboi Carti	The Christmas Song	Nat King Cole	Whole Lotta Red	Playboi Carti	
January 16	The Voice	Lil Durk	After Hours †	The Weeknd	The Voice	Lil Durk	
January 23	Shoot for the Stars, Aim for the Moon †	Pop Smoke	Heaux Tales	Jazmine Sullivan	Shoot for the Stars, Aim for the Moon †	Pop Smoke	
January 30	Shoot for the Stars, Aim for the Moon †	Pop Smoke	After Hours †	The Weeknd	Shoot for the Stars, Aim for the Moon †	Pop Smoke	
February 6	Shoot for the Stars, Aim for the Moon †	Pop Smoke	After Hours †	The Weeknd	Shoot for the Stars, Aim for the Moon †	Pop Smoke	
February 13	The Voice	Lil Durk	After Hours †	The Weeknd	The Voice	Lil Durk	
February 20	The Highlights	The Weeknd	The Highlights	The Weeknd	Shiesty Season	Pooh Shiesty	
February 27	After Hours	The Weeknd	After Hours †	The Weeknd	The Voice	Lil Durk	
March 6	Shoot for the Stars, Aim for the Moon †	Pop Smoke	After Hours †	The Weeknd	Shoot for the Stars, Aim for the Moon †	Pop Smoke	
March 13	The Highlights	The Weeknd	The Highlights	The Weeknd	Shoot for the Stars, Aim for the Moon †	Pop Smoke	
March 20	Shoot for the Stars, Aim for the Moon †	Pop Smoke	After Hours †	The Weeknd	Shoot for the Stars, Aim for the Moon †	Pop Smoke	
March 27	Shoot for the Stars, Aim for the Moon †	Pop Smoke	After Hours †	The Weeknd	Shoot for the Stars, Aim for the Moon †	Pop Smoke	
April 3	Shoot for the Stars, Aim for the Moon †	Pop Smoke	After Hours †	The Weeknd	Shoot for the Stars, Aim for the Moon †	Pop Smoke	
April 10	SoulFly	Rod Wave	The Highlights	The Weeknd	SoulFly	Rod Wave	
April 17	SoulFly	Rod Wave	The Highlights	The Weeknd	SoulFly	Rod Wave	
April 24	The Best of DMX	DMX	The Highlights	The Weeknd	The Best of DMX	DMX	
May 1	Slime Language 2	Young Thug & Various Artists	The Highlights	The Weeknd	Slime Language 2	Young Thug & Various Artists	
May 8	A Gangsta's Pain	Moneybagg Yo	After Hours †	The Weeknd	A Gangsta’s Pain	Moneybagg Yo	
May 15	Khaled Khaled	DJ Khaled	After Hours †	The Weeknd	Khaled Khaled	DJ Khaled	
May 22	A Gangsta's Pain	Moneybagg Yo	After Hours †	The Weeknd	A Gangsta's Pain	Moneybagg Yo	
May 29	The Off-Season	J. Cole	After Hours †	The Weeknd	The Off-Season	J. Cole	
June 5	The Off-Season	J. Cole	After Hours †	The Weeknd	The Off-Season	J. Cole	
June 12	The Off-Season	J. Cole	After Hours †	The Weeknd	The Off-Season	J. Cole	
June 19	The Voice of the Heroes	Lil Baby and Lil Durk	After Hours †	The Weeknd	The Voice of the Heroes	Lil Baby and Lil Durk	
June 26	Hall of Fame	Polo G	After Hours †	The Weeknd	Hall of Fame	Polo G	
July 3	Hall of Fame	Polo G	Back of My Mind	H.E.R.	Hall of Fame	Polo G	
July 10	Call Me If You Get Lost	Tyler, the Creator	Planet Her	Doja Cat	Call Me If You Get Lost	Tyler, the Creator	
July 17	Planet Her	Doja Cat	Planet Her	Doja Cat	The Voice of the Heroes	Lil Baby and Lil Durk	
July 24	Planet Her	Doja Cat	Planet Her	Doja Cat	The Voice of the Heroes	Lil Baby and Lil Durk	
July 31	Faith	Pop Smoke	Planet Her	Doja Cat	Faith	Pop Smoke	
August 7	F*ck Love	The Kid Laroi	Planet Her	Doja Cat	F*ck Love	The Kid Laroi	
August 14	F*ck Love	The Kid Laroi	Welcome 2 America	Prince	F*ck Love	The Kid Laroi	
August 21	King’s Disease II	Nas	Planet Her	Doja Cat	King’s Disease II	Nas	
August 28	Planet Her	Doja Cat	Planet Her	Doja Cat	F*ck Love	The Kid Laroi	
September 4	Trip at Knight	Trippie Redd	Planet Her	Doja Cat	Trip at Knight	Trippie Redd	
September 11	Donda	Kanye West	Planet Her	Doja Cat	Donda	Kanye West	
September 18	Certified Lover Boy	Drake	Planet Her	Doja Cat	Certified Lover Boy	Drake	
September 25	Certified Lover Boy	Drake	Planet Her	Doja Cat	Certified Lover Boy	Drake	
October 2	Certified Lover Boy	Drake	Planet Her	Doja Cat	Certified Lover Boy	Drake	
October 9	Sincerely, Kentrell	YoungBoy Never Broke Again	Planet Her	Doja Cat	Sincerely, Kentrell	YoungBoy Never Broke Again	
October 16	Certified Lover Boy	Drake	Planet Her	Doja Cat	Certified Lover Boy	Drake	
October 23	Certified Lover Boy	Drake	Planet Her	Doja Cat	Certified Lover Boy	Drake	
October 30	Punk	Young Thug	Planet Her	Doja Cat	Punk	Young Thug	
November 6	Certified Lover Boy	Drake	Planet Her	Doja Cat	Certified Lover Boy	Drake	
November 13	Certified Lover Boy	Drake	Planet Her	Doja Cat	Certified Lover Boy	Drake	
November 20	Still Over It	Summer Walker	Still Over It	Summer Walker	Certified Lover Boy	Drake	
November 27	An Evening with Silk Sonic	Silk Sonic (Bruno Mars and Anderson .Paak)	An Evening with Silk Sonic	Silk Sonic (Bruno Mars and Anderson .Paak)	Certified Lover Boy	Drake	
December 4	Certified Lover Boy	Drake	An Evening with Silk Sonic	Silk Sonic (Bruno Mars and Anderson .Paak)	Certified Lover Boy	Drake	
December 11	Certified Lover Boy	Drake	Still Over It	Summer Walker	Certified Lover Boy	Drake	
December 18	Hall of Fame	Polo G	Merry Christmas	Mariah Carey	Hall of Fame	Polo G	
December 25	Fighting Demons	Juice Wrld	Merry Christmas	Mariah Carey	Fighting Demons	Juice Wrld	

== See also ==
- 2021 in American music
- List of Billboard 200 number-one albums of 2021
- List of number-one R&B/hip-hop songs of 2021 (U.S.)
