= List of Billboard Top R&B/Hip-Hop Albums number ones of 2026 =

This page lists the albums that reached number-one on the overall Billboard Top R&B/Hip-Hop Albums chart, the R&B Albums chart, and the Rap Albums chart in 2026. The R&B Albums and Rap Albums charts partly serve as respective distillations for R&B and rap-specific titles of the overall R&B/Hip-Hop Albums chart.

== Chart history ==
Issue date	Top R&B/Hip-Hop Albums	Artist(s)	Top R&B Albums	Artist(s)	Top Rap Albums	Artist(s)	Ref.
January 3	The Christmas Song	Nat King Cole	The Christmas Song	Nat King Cole	What Happened to the Streets?	21 Savage	
January 10	SOS	SZA	SOS	SZA	The Diamond Collection	Post Malone	
January 17	SOS	SZA	SOS	SZA	The Diamond Collection	Post Malone	
January 24	SOS	SZA	SOS	SZA	The Diamond Collection	Post Malone	
January 31	Don't Be Dumb	ASAP Rocky	SOS	SZA	Don't Be Dumb	ASAP Rocky	
February 7	Don't Be Dumb	ASAP Rocky	SOS	SZA	Don't Be Dumb	ASAP Rocky	
February 14	Octane	Don Toliver	SOS	SZA	Octane	Don Toliver	
February 21	The Fall-Off	J. Cole	SOS	SZA	The Fall-Off	J. Cole	
February 28	The Fall-Off	J. Cole	Icon	Brent Faiyaz	The Fall-Off	J. Cole	
March 7	Casino	Baby Keem	SOS	SZA	Casino	Baby Keem	
March 14	The Romantic	Bruno Mars	The Romantic	Bruno Mars	Octane	Don Toliver	
March 21	The Romantic	Bruno Mars	The Romantic	Bruno Mars	Octane	Don Toliver	
March 28	Octane	Don Toliver	The Romantic	Bruno Mars	Octane	Don Toliver	
April 4	Octane	Don Toliver	The Romantic	Bruno Mars	Octane	Don Toliver	
April 11	Bully	Ye	The Romantic	Bruno Mars	Bully	Ye	
April 18	Bully	Ye	The Romantic	Bruno Mars	Bully	Ye	
April 25	Octane	Don Toliver	Swag	Justin Bieber	Octane	Don Toliver	
May 2	Swag	Justin Bieber	Swag	Justin Bieber	Octane	Don Toliver	
May 9	Kehlani	Kehlani	Kehlani	Kehlani	Octane	Don Toliver	
May 16	Thriller	Michael Jackson	Thriller	Michael Jackson	Octane	Don Toliver	
May 23	Thriller	Michael Jackson	Thriller	Michael Jackson	Octane	Don Toliver	
May 30	Iceman	Drake	Habibti	Drake	Iceman	Drake	
June 6	Iceman	Drake	Thriller	Michael Jackson	Iceman	Drake	
June 13	Iceman	Drake	Thriller	Michael Jackson	Iceman	Drake	
June 20	Iceman	Drake	Thriller	Michael Jackson	Iceman	Drake	
June 27	Iceman	Drake	Thriller	Michael Jackson	Iceman	Drake	
July 4	Iceman	Drake	Thriller	Michael Jackson	Iceman	Drake	
July 11	Iceman	Drake	Thriller	Michael Jackson	Iceman	Drake	
July 18	Iceman	Drake	Thriller	Michael Jackson	Iceman	Drake	
July 25	The Real Me	Future	Thriller	Michael Jackson	The Real Me	Future	
August 1	Iceman	Drake	Thriller	Michael Jackson	Iceman	Drake	
August 8	Iceman	Drake	Thriller	Michael Jackson	Iceman	Drake	
August 15	Iceman	Drake	Thriller	Michael Jackson	Iceman	Drake	
August 22	All Eyes on Shiest	Pooh Shiesty	Thriller	Michael Jackson	All Eyes on Shiest	Pooh Shiesty	
August 29	Iceman	Drake	Thriller	Michael Jackson	Iceman	Drake	
September 5	Iceman	Drake	Thriller	Michael Jackson	Iceman	Drake	
September 12	Don't Look Down	Rod Wave	Thriller	Michael Jackson	Don't Look Down	Rod Wave	
September 19	Don't Look Down	Rod Wave	B'Day	Beyoncé	Don't Look Down	Rod Wave	
September 26	Westside Whimsy	Jhené Aiko	Westside Whimsy	Jhené Aiko	Iceman	Drake	
October 3	Westside Whimsy	Jhené Aiko	Westside Whimsy	Jhené Aiko	Iceman	Drake	
October 10	Iceman	Drake	SOS	SZA	Iceman	Drake	
October 17	Habibti	Drake	Habibti	Drake	The Divine Feminine	Mac Miller	
October 24	Habibti	Drake	Habibti	Drake	Iceman	Drake	
October 31	Habibti	Drake	Habibti	Drake	Iceman	Drake	
November 7	Habibti	Drake	Habibti	Drake	Heavy Is the Crown	Anderson .Paak and Cordae	
November 14	Thriller	Michael Jackson	Thriller	Michael Jackson	Better Over Time	BigXthaPlug	
November 21	Fresh	Lil Baby	SOS	SZA	Fresh	Lil Baby	

== See also ==
- 2026 in American music
- 2026 in hip-hop
- List of Billboard 200 number-one albums of 2026
- List of Billboard Hot R&B/Hip-Hop Songs number ones of 2026
