= List of Billboard Hot R&B/Hip-Hop Songs number ones of 2026 =

This page lists the songs that reached number one on the overall Billboard Hot R&B/Hip-Hop Songs, Hot R&B Songs, Hot Rap Songs and R&B/Hip-Hop Airplay charts in 2026. The R&B Songs and Rap Songs charts partly serve as respective distillations of the overall R&B/Hip-Hop Songs chart, apart from the R&B/Hip-Hop Airplay chart which serve as a forefront for radio and video airplay counts.

== Chart history ==
Issue date	Hot R&B/Hip-Hop Songs	Artist(s)	Hot R&B Songs	Artist(s)	Hot Rap Songs	Artist(s)	R&B/Hip-Hop Airplay	Artist(s)	Ref.
January 3	"Folded"	Kehlani	"Folded"	Kehlani	"FDO"	Pooh Shiesty	"It Depends"	Chris Brown featuring Bryson Tiller	
January 10	"Folded"	Kehlani	"Folded"	Kehlani	"FDO"	Pooh Shiesty	"It Depends"	Chris Brown featuring Bryson Tiller	
January 17	"Folded"	Kehlani	"Folded"	Kehlani	"What You Saying"	Lil Uzi Vert	"It Depends"	Chris Brown featuring Bryson Tiller	
January 24	"I Just Might"	Bruno Mars	"I Just Might"	Bruno Mars	"What You Saying"	Lil Uzi Vert	"It Depends"	Chris Brown featuring Bryson Tiller	
January 31	"I Just Might"	Bruno Mars	"I Just Might"	Bruno Mars	"What You Saying"	Lil Uzi Vert	"Folded"	Kehlani	
February 7	"I Just Might"	Bruno Mars	"I Just Might"	Bruno Mars	"What You Saying"	Lil Uzi Vert	"Folded"	Kehlani	
February 14	"I Just Might"	Bruno Mars	"I Just Might"	Bruno Mars	"Body"	Don Toliver	"Folded"	Kehlani	
February 21	"I Just Might"	Bruno Mars	"I Just Might"	Bruno Mars	"Two Six"	J. Cole	"Folded"	Kehlani	
February 28	"I Just Might"	Bruno Mars	"I Just Might"	Bruno Mars	"E85"	Don Toliver	"Folded"	Kehlani	
March 7	"I Just Might"	Bruno Mars	"I Just Might"	Bruno Mars	"E85"	Don Toliver	"Folded"	Kehlani	
March 14	"I Just Might"	Bruno Mars	"I Just Might"	Bruno Mars	"E85"	Don Toliver	"Folded"	Kehlani	
March 21	"I Just Might"	Bruno Mars	"I Just Might"	Bruno Mars	"E85"	Don Toliver	"Folded"	Kehlani	
March 28	"I Just Might"	Bruno Mars	"I Just Might"	Bruno Mars	"E85"	Don Toliver	"Folded"	Kehlani	
April 4	"I Just Might"	Bruno Mars	"I Just Might"	Bruno Mars	"E85"	Don Toliver	"Folded"	Kehlani	
April 11	"I Just Might"	Bruno Mars	"I Just Might"	Bruno Mars	"E85"	Don Toliver	"Folded"	Kehlani	
April 18	"I Just Might"	Bruno Mars	"I Just Might"	Bruno Mars	"E85"	Don Toliver	"Folded"	Kehlani	
April 25	"I Just Might"	Bruno Mars	"I Just Might"	Bruno Mars	"E85"	Don Toliver	"Folded"	Kehlani	
May 2	"I Just Might"	Bruno Mars	"I Just Might"	Bruno Mars	"E85"	Don Toliver	"Folded"	Kehlani	
May 9	"I Just Might"	Bruno Mars	"I Just Might"	Bruno Mars	"E85"	Don Toliver	"Folded"	Kehlani	
May 16	"I Just Might"	Bruno Mars	"I Just Might"	Bruno Mars	"Pop Dat Thang"	DaBaby	"Folded"	Kehlani	
May 23	"I Just Might"	Bruno Mars	"I Just Might"	Bruno Mars	"Pop Dat Thang"	DaBaby	"Folded"	Kehlani	
May 30	"Janice STFU"	Drake	"I Just Might"	Bruno Mars	"Janice STFU"	Drake	"Folded"	Kehlani	
June 6	"Janice STFU"	Drake	"I Just Might"	Bruno Mars	"Janice STFU"	Drake	"Folded"	Kehlani	
June 13	"Janice STFU"	Drake	"I Just Might"	Bruno Mars	"Janice STFU"	Drake	"Folded"	Kehlani	
June 20	"Janice STFU"	Drake	"I Just Might"	Bruno Mars	"Janice STFU"	Drake	"Folded"	Kehlani	
June 27	"Janice STFU"	Drake	"I Just Might"	Bruno Mars	"Janice STFU"	Drake	"Folded"	Kehlani	
July 4	"Janice STFU"	Drake	"I Just Might"	Bruno Mars	"Janice STFU"	Drake	"Folded"	Kehlani	
July 11	"Janice STFU"	Drake	"I Just Might"	Bruno Mars	"Janice STFU"	Drake	"Folded"	Kehlani	
July 18	"I Just Might"	Bruno Mars	"I Just Might"	Bruno Mars	"Janice STFU"	Drake	"Folded"	Kehlani	
July 25	"I Just Might"	Bruno Mars	"I Just Might"	Bruno Mars	"Janice STFU"	Drake	"Folded"	Kehlani	
August 1	"I Just Might"	Bruno Mars	"I Just Might"	Bruno Mars	"Janice STFU"	Drake	"Folded"	Kehlani	
August 8	"I Just Might"	Bruno Mars	"I Just Might"	Bruno Mars	"Janice STFU"	Drake	"Folded"	Kehlani	
August 15	"I Just Might"	Bruno Mars	"I Just Might"	Bruno Mars	"Janice STFU"	Drake	"Folded"	Kehlani	
August 22	"I Just Might"	Bruno Mars	"I Just Might"	Bruno Mars	"Janice STFU"	Drake	"What You Need"	Tems	
August 29	"I Just Might"	Bruno Mars	"I Just Might"	Bruno Mars	"Janice STFU"	Drake	"What You Need"	Tems	
September 5	"I Just Might"	Bruno Mars	"I Just Might"	Bruno Mars	"Janice STFU"	Drake	"What You Need"	Tems	
September 12	"I Just Might"	Bruno Mars	"I Just Might"	Bruno Mars	"Janice STFU"	Drake	"What You Need"	Tems	
September 19	"I Just Might"	Bruno Mars	"I Just Might"	Bruno Mars	"Janice STFU"	Drake	"What You Need"	Tems	
September 26	"I Just Might"	Bruno Mars	"I Just Might"	Bruno Mars	"Janice STFU"	Drake	"What You Need"	Tems	
October 3	"I Just Might"	Bruno Mars	"I Just Might"	Bruno Mars	"Janice STFU"	Drake	"What You Need"	Tems	
October 10	"I Just Might"	Bruno Mars	"I Just Might"	Bruno Mars	"Janice STFU"	Drake	"What You Need"	Tems	
October 17	"Solar Eclipse"	Drake and Don Toliver	"Solar Eclipse"	Drake and Don Toliver	"Quebec"	Drake	"What You Need"	Tems	
October 24	"I Just Might"	Bruno Mars	"I Just Might"	Bruno Mars	"Janice STFU"	Drake	"What You Need"	Tems	
October 31	"I Just Might"	Bruno Mars	"I Just Might"	Bruno Mars	"Janice STFU"	Drake	"What You Need"	Tems	
November 7	"I Just Might"	Bruno Mars	"I Just Might"	Bruno Mars	"Janice STFU"	Drake	"What You Need"	Tems	
November 14	"I Just Might"	Bruno Mars	"I Just Might"	Bruno Mars	"Janice STFU"	Drake	"What You Need"	Tems	
November 21	"I Just Might"	Bruno Mars	"I Just Might"	Bruno Mars	"Dead Fresh"	Lil Baby	"What You Need"	Tems	

== See also ==
- 2026 in American music
- 2026 in hip-hop
- List of Billboard Hot 100 number ones of 2026
- List of Billboard number-one R&B/hip-hop albums of 2026
