= What It Feels Like =

What It Feels Like may refer to:

- "What It Feels Like" (song), by Nipsey Hussle and Jay-Z from Judas and the Black Messiah soundtrack
- "What it Feels Like", a column in Esquire magazine
- "What It Feels Like", song by Prince from Art Official Age
- "What It Feels Like", song by Sandro Cavazza
- "What It Feels Like", song by We Are the Ocean
- "What It Feels Like", song by FFH

== See also ==
- "This Is What It Feels Like", a 2013 song by Dutch DJ Armin van Buuren
- "This Is What It Feels Like", a song by American singer-songwriter Banks
- "What It Feels Like for a Girl", a 2000 song by American singer-songwriter Madonna
