= List of number-one R&B/hip-hop songs of 2021 (U.S.) =

This page lists the songs that reached number-one on the overall Hot R&B/Hip-Hop Songs chart, the R&B Songs chart (which was created in 2012), and the Hot Rap Songs chart in 2021. The R&B Songs and Rap Songs charts partly serve as distillations of the overall R&B/Hip-Hop Songs chart.

== Chart history ==
Key
†	Indicates best-performing song of 2021

Issue date	R&B/Hip-Hop Songs	Artist	R&B Songs	Artist	Rap Songs	Artist	R&B/Hip-Hop Airplay	Artist	Refs.
January 2	"Go Crazy"	Chris Brown and Young Thug	"Go Crazy"	Chris Brown and Young Thug	"Mood" †	24kGoldn featuring Iann Dior	"Go Crazy"	Chris Brown and Young Thug	
January 9	"Blinding Lights"	The Weeknd	"Blinding Lights"	The Weeknd	"Mood" †	24kGoldn featuring Iann Dior	"Go Crazy"	Chris Brown and Young Thug	
January 16	"Blinding Lights"	The Weeknd	"Blinding Lights"	The Weeknd	"Mood" †	24kGoldn featuring Iann Dior	"Go Crazy"	Chris Brown and Young Thug	
January 23	"Blinding Lights"	The Weeknd	"Blinding Lights"	The Weeknd	"Mood" †	24kGoldn featuring Iann Dior	"Go Crazy"	Chris Brown and Young Thug	
January 30	"Blinding Lights"	The Weeknd	"Blinding Lights"	The Weeknd	"Mood" †	24kGoldn featuring Iann Dior	"Go Crazy"	Chris Brown and Young Thug	
February 6	"Blinding Lights"	The Weeknd	"Blinding Lights"	The Weeknd	"Mood" †	24kGoldn featuring Iann Dior	"Go Crazy"	Chris Brown and Young Thug	
February 13	"Blinding Lights"	The Weeknd	"Blinding Lights"	The Weeknd	"Mood" †	24kGoldn featuring Iann Dior	"Go Crazy"	Chris Brown and Young Thug	
February 20	"Up"	Cardi B	"Blinding Lights"	The Weeknd	"Up"	Cardi B	"Go Crazy"	Chris Brown and Young Thug	
February 27	"Calling My Phone"	Lil Tjay featuring 6lack	"Blinding Lights"	The Weeknd	"Calling My Phone"	Lil Tjay featuring 6lack	"Go Crazy"	Chris Brown and Young Thug	
March 6	"Up"	Cardi B	"Go Crazy"	Chris Brown and Young Thug	"Up"	Cardi B	"Go Crazy"	Chris Brown and Young Thug	
March 13	"Up"	Cardi B	"Blinding Lights"	The Weeknd	"Up"	Cardi B	"Go Crazy"	Chris Brown and Young Thug	
March 20	"What's Next"	Drake	"Leave the Door Open" †	Silk Sonic (Bruno Mars and Anderson .Paak)	"What's Next"	Drake	"Go Crazy"	Chris Brown and Young Thug	
March 27	"Up"	Cardi B	"Leave the Door Open" †	Silk Sonic (Bruno Mars and Anderson .Paak)	"Up"	Cardi B	"Go Crazy"	Chris Brown and Young Thug	
April 3	"Peaches"	Justin Bieber featuring Daniel Caesar and Giveon	"Peaches"	Justin Bieber featuring Daniel Caesar and Giveon	"Up"	Cardi B	"Go Crazy"	Chris Brown and Young Thug	
April 10	"Peaches"	Justin Bieber featuring Daniel Caesar and Giveon	"Peaches"	Justin Bieber featuring Daniel Caesar and Giveon	"Up"	Cardi B	"Go Crazy"	Chris Brown and Young Thug	
April 17	"Leave the Door Open" †	Silk Sonic (Bruno Mars and Anderson .Paak)	"Leave the Door Open" †	Silk Sonic (Bruno Mars and Anderson .Paak)	"Up"	Cardi B	"Go Crazy"	Chris Brown and Young Thug	
April 24	"Rapstar"	Polo G	"Leave the Door Open" †	Silk Sonic (Bruno Mars and Anderson .Paak)	"Rapstar"	Polo G	"Leave the Door Open"	Silk Sonic (Bruno Mars and Anderson .Paak)	
May 1	"Rapstar"	Polo G	"Leave the Door Open" †	Silk Sonic (Bruno Mars and Anderson .Paak)	"Rapstar"	Polo G	"Leave the Door Open"	Silk Sonic (Bruno Mars and Anderson .Paak)	
May 8	“Leave the Door Open” †	Silk Sonic (Bruno Mars and Anderson .Paak)	"Leave the Door Open" †	Silk Sonic (Bruno Mars and Anderson .Paak)	"Rapstar"	Polo G	"Leave the Door Open"	Silk Sonic (Bruno Mars and Anderson .Paak)	
May 15	“Leave the Door Open” †	Silk Sonic (Bruno Mars and Anderson .Paak)	"Leave the Door Open" †	Silk Sonic (Bruno Mars and Anderson .Paak)	"Rapstar"	Polo G	"Leave the Door Open"	Silk Sonic (Bruno Mars and Anderson .Paak)	
May 22	“Leave the Door Open” †	Silk Sonic (Bruno Mars and Anderson .Paak)	"Leave the Door Open" †	Silk Sonic (Bruno Mars and Anderson .Paak)	"Astronaut in the Ocean"	Masked Wolf	"Leave the Door Open"	Silk Sonic (Bruno Mars and Anderson .Paak)	
May 29	"My Life"	J. Cole, 21 Savage and Morray	"Leave the Door Open" †	Silk Sonic (Bruno Mars and Anderson .Paak)	"My Life"	J. Cole, 21 Savage and Morray	"Leave the Door Open"	Silk Sonic (Bruno Mars and Anderson .Paak)	
June 5	"Leave the Door Open" †	Silk Sonic (Bruno Mars and Anderson .Paak)	"Leave the Door Open" †	Silk Sonic (Bruno Mars and Anderson .Paak)	"Astronaut in the Ocean"	Masked Wolf	"Leave the Door Open"	Silk Sonic (Bruno Mars and Anderson .Paak)	
June 12	"Leave the Door Open" †	Silk Sonic (Bruno Mars and Anderson .Paak)	"Leave the Door Open" †	Silk Sonic (Bruno Mars and Anderson .Paak)	"Astronaut in the Ocean"	Masked Wolf	"Leave the Door Open"	Silk Sonic (Bruno Mars and Anderson .Paak)	
June 19	“Peaches”	Justin Bieber featuring Daniel Caesar and Giveon	“Peaches”	Justin Bieber featuring Daniel Caesar and Giveon	"Astronaut in the Ocean"	Masked Wolf	"Leave the Door Open"	Silk Sonic (Bruno Mars and Anderson .Paak)	
June 26	“Peaches”	Justin Bieber featuring Daniel Caesar and Giveon	“Peaches”	Justin Bieber featuring Daniel Caesar and Giveon	"Astronaut in the Ocean"	Masked Wolf	"Leave the Door Open"	Silk Sonic (Bruno Mars and Anderson .Paak)	
July 3	“Peaches”	Justin Bieber featuring Daniel Caesar and Giveon	“Peaches”	Justin Bieber featuring Daniel Caesar and Giveon	"Astronaut in the Ocean"	Masked Wolf	"Leave the Door Open"	Silk Sonic (Bruno Mars and Anderson .Paak)	
July 10	"Leave the Door Open" †	Silk Sonic (Bruno Mars and Anderson .Paak)	"Leave the Door Open" †	Silk Sonic (Bruno Mars and Anderson .Paak)	"Astronaut in the Ocean"	Masked Wolf	"Leave the Door Open"	Silk Sonic (Bruno Mars and Anderson .Paak)	
July 17	"Leave the Door Open" †	Silk Sonic (Bruno Mars and Anderson .Paak)	"Leave the Door Open" †	Silk Sonic (Bruno Mars and Anderson .Paak)	"Astronaut in the Ocean"	Masked Wolf	"Leave the Door Open"	Silk Sonic (Bruno Mars and Anderson .Paak)	
July 24	"Peaches"	Justin Bieber featuring Daniel Caesar and Giveon	"Peaches"	Justin Bieber featuring Daniel Caesar and Giveon	"Motley Crew"	Post Malone	"Leave the Door Open"	Silk Sonic (Bruno Mars and Anderson .Paak)	
July 31	"Peaches"	Justin Bieber featuring Daniel Caesar and Giveon	"Peaches"	Justin Bieber featuring Daniel Caesar and Giveon	"Rapstar"	Polo G	"Leave the Door Open"	Silk Sonic (Bruno Mars and Anderson .Paak)	
August 7	"Industry Baby"	Lil Nas X and Jack Harlow	"Peaches"	Justin Bieber featuring Daniel Caesar and Giveon	"Industry Baby"	Lil Nas X and Jack Harlow	"Leave the Door Open"	Silk Sonic (Bruno Mars and Anderson .Paak)	
August 14	"Industry Baby"	Lil Nas X and Jack Harlow	"Leave the Door Open" †	Silk Sonic (Bruno Mars and Anderson .Paak)	"Industry Baby"	Lil Nas X and Jack Harlow	"Leave the Door Open"	Silk Sonic (Bruno Mars and Anderson .Paak)	
August 21	"Industry Baby"	Lil Nas X and Jack Harlow	"Peaches"	Justin Bieber featuring Daniel Caesar and Giveon	"Industry Baby"	Lil Nas X and Jack Harlow	"Leave the Door Open"	Silk Sonic (Bruno Mars and Anderson .Paak)	
August 28	"Rumors"	Lizzo featuring Cardi B	"Peaches"	Justin Bieber featuring Daniel Caesar and Giveon	"Rumors"	Lizzo featuring Cardi B	"Wockesha"	Moneybagg Yo	
September 4	"Industry Baby"	Lil Nas X and Jack Harlow	"You Right"	Doja Cat and The Weeknd	"Industry Baby"	Lil Nas X and Jack Harlow	"Essence"	Wizkid featuring Justin Bieber and Tems	
September 11	"Hurricane"	Kanye West	"Essence"	Wizkid featuring Justin Bieber and Tems	"Hurricane"	Kanye West	"Essence"	Wizkid featuring Justin Bieber and Tems	
September 18	"Way 2 Sexy"	Drake featuring Future and Young Thug	"Race My Mind"	Drake	"Way 2 Sexy"	Drake featuring Future and Young Thug	"Essence"	Wizkid featuring Justin Bieber and Tems	
September 25	"Way 2 Sexy"	Drake featuring Future and Young Thug	"Essence"	Wizkid featuring Justin Bieber and Tems	"Way 2 Sexy"	Drake featuring Future and Young Thug	"Essence"	Wizkid featuring Justin Bieber and Tems	
October 2	"Industry Baby"	Lil Nas X and Jack Harlow	"Essence"	Wizkid featuring Justin Bieber and Tems	"Industry Baby"	Lil Nas X and Jack Harlow	"Essence"	Wizkid featuring Justin Bieber and Tems	
October 9	"Industry Baby"	Lil Nas X and Jack Harlow	"Essence"	Wizkid featuring Justin Bieber and Tems	"Industry Baby"	Lil Nas X and Jack Harlow	"Essence"	Wizkid featuring Justin Bieber and Tems	
October 16	"Industry Baby"	Lil Nas X and Jack Harlow	"Essence"	Wizkid featuring Justin Bieber and Tems	"Industry Baby"	Lil Nas X and Jack Harlow	"Essence"	Wizkid featuring Justin Bieber and Tems	
October 23	"Industry Baby"	Lil Nas X and Jack Harlow	"Essence"	Wizkid featuring Justin Bieber and Tems	"Industry Baby"	Lil Nas X and Jack Harlow	"Essence"	Wizkid featuring Justin Bieber and Tems	
October 30	"Industry Baby"	Lil Nas X and Jack Harlow	"Essence"	Wizkid featuring Justin Bieber and Tems	"Industry Baby"	Lil Nas X and Jack Harlow	"Essence"	Wizkid featuring Justin Bieber and Tems	
November 6	"Industry Baby"	Lil Nas X and Jack Harlow	"Essence"	Wizkid featuring Justin Bieber and Tems	"Industry Baby"	Lil Nas X and Jack Harlow	"Essence"	Wizkid featuring Justin Bieber and Tems	
November 13	"Industry Baby"	Lil Nas X and Jack Harlow	"Essence"	Wizkid featuring Justin Bieber and Tems	"Industry Baby"	Lil Nas X and Jack Harlow	"Essence"	Wizkid featuring Justin Bieber and Tems	
November 20	"Industry Baby"	Lil Nas X and Jack Harlow	"Smokin out the Window"	Silk Sonic (Bruno Mars and Anderson .Paak)	"Industry Baby"	Lil Nas X and Jack Harlow	"Essence"	Wizkid featuring Justin Bieber and Tems	
November 27	"Industry Baby"	Lil Nas X and Jack Harlow	"Smokin out the Window"	Silk Sonic (Bruno Mars and Anderson .Paak)	"Industry Baby"	Lil Nas X and Jack Harlow	"Essence"	Wizkid featuring Justin Bieber and Tems	
December 4	"Industry Baby"	Lil Nas X and Jack Harlow	"Smokin out the Window"	Silk Sonic (Bruno Mars and Anderson .Paak)	"Industry Baby"	Lil Nas X and Jack Harlow	"Essence"	Wizkid featuring Justin Bieber and Tems	
December 11	"Industry Baby"	Lil Nas X and Jack Harlow	"Smokin out the Window"	Silk Sonic (Bruno Mars and Anderson .Paak)	"Industry Baby"	Lil Nas X and Jack Harlow	"Essence"	Wizkid featuring Justin Bieber and Tems	
December 18	"I Hate U"	SZA	"I Hate U"	SZA	"Industry Baby"	Lil Nas X and Jack Harlow	"Essence"	Wizkid featuring Justin Bieber and Tems	
December 25	"Industry Baby"	Lil Nas X and Jack Harlow	"Smokin out the Window"	Silk Sonic (Bruno Mars and Anderson .Paak)	"Industry Baby"	Lil Nas X and Jack Harlow	"Essence"	Wizkid featuring Justin Bieber and Tems	

== See also ==
- List of Billboard Hot 100 number-one singles of 2021
- List of Billboard number-one R&B/hip-hop albums of 2021
