= Beat Box (SpotemGottem song) =

2020 single by SpotemGottem

Single by SpotemGottem

from the album Final Destination
- Released: April 20, 2020
- Length: 1:50
- Label: Rebel; INgrooves
- Songwriters: Nehemiah Harden; Elisner Joseph
- Producer: Damn E

SpotemGottem singles chronology
"Street Gossip" (2020)	"Beat Box" (2020)	"Survivor" (2020)

"Beat Box" is the debut single by American rapper SpotemGottem. It was released on April 20, 2020, while the first remix, titled "Beat Box 2" featuring fellow American rapper Pooh Shiesty was released on December 18, 2020, alongside a video, and as part of SpotemGottem's debut mixtape, Final Destination. The first remix pushed the song to viral status on the video-sharing app TikTok, spawning the "#JunebugChallenge", and later became SpotemGottem's first chart entry.

American rapper DaBaby released a freestyle version of the song, which was worked into a second remix, titled "Beat Box 3", released February 18, 2021. A third remix of the song with vocals from American rapper Latto, accordingly dubbed the "Big Latto Mix", was released on March 13, 2021. A fourth remix followed on March 26, 2021, with Jamaican dancehall artist Shenseea, following her freestyle version. A fifth remix, titled "Beat Box 4", was released April 16, 2021 featuring rapper NLE Choppa. A remix with BigKayBeezy was released on April 22, 2021. On April 23, 2021, another remix entitled "Beat Box 5" featuring Polo G was released. On May 1, 2021, a remix with the rapper Dee Watkins was released. Two days later, on May 3, 2021, another remix was released featuring Young M.A.

Lyrically, "Beat Box" is about how SpotemGottem's pistol is so loud it can "make a beat box". The song contains violent rhymes, with a heavy bass production by Damn E.

== Background ==
"Beat Box" was released in April 2020 as a standalone single. Prior to the release of the Pooh Shiesty remix, the original version of "Beat Box" had already accumulated over six million views on YouTube. By January 2021, the remix had garnered over 2.8 million streams on Spotify. It was aided by viral TikTok videos of its accompanying dance, the #JunebugChallenge, named after its creator, Junebug, a social media personality and digital creator. He posted his first #JunebugChallenge video to TikTok and Instagram on December 24, and continued posting a new video until it started going viral. The dance, as noted by HipHopDX's Marisa Mendez, involves "a spastic movement of your entire body in every and any random location you can find"; it includes flailing both arms, while leaning backwards and slightly limping. The dancing was described as "erratic". SpotemGottem embraced the dance, and met Junebug in January 2021.

== Composition and lyrics ==
The production of "Beat Box" was described as containing "bass drums that taser your skin", with SpotemGottem delivering violent narratives about a shoot-out and how his draco is so loud, it "make a beat box". The songs's refrain, "Ready to get it started/Bitch, I got no sense", was popularized in video clips on TikTok. The line, "Oh, he the plug, riding round with 4 bricks / Call me Kobe, 24 Kobe", sees SpotemGottem distorting his voice towards the end of the bar, similar to Playboi Carti's "baby" voice. "Beat Box 2" is essentially the same song, apart from the addition of Pooh Shiesty's verse.

== Critical reception ==
Noisey's Kristin Corry compared SpotemGottem's vocals to Kodak Black and No Ceilings-era Lil Wayne, stating that "At 18, he has got the energy and charisma to make you forget that 'Beat Box' is actually about a shootout". HipHopDX's Mark Elibert called the song an undeniable hit and a "banger".

== Music video ==
The official video was released along with the song on April 20, 2020. It consists of SpotemGottem breaking out of a straitjacket and showing off a range of weapons. The dance challenge is not featured in the video, as it only originated on TikTok in December 2020. By January 2021, the visual amassed nearly 14 million views on YouTube.

== Chart performance ==
Thanks to its viral success, the song debuted at number 84 on the Billboard Hot 100, on the chart dated January 30, 2021, becoming SpotemGottem's first entry on the chart. Following the release of remixes "Beat Box 3" and "Beat Box 4", the song reached number 12 on the Hot 100, and at number 6 on the Hot R&B/Hip-Hop charts both dated April 24, 2021. On top of becoming SpotemGottem's first entry to the component chart's top 10, the song received a joint credit on the website due to both Beat Box 2 and Beat Box 3 having significant impact on the song's performance. As such, Pooh Shiesty and DaBaby are both credited on the song, meaning the 2nd and 9th entry in the top 10 for Pooh Shiesty (following "Back in Blood") and DaBaby respectively.

== "Beat Box 3" ==
"Beat Box 3"

Single by SpotemGottem featuring DaBaby

from the album Most Wanted
- Released: February 26, 2021
- Genre: Hip hop
- Length: 3:20
- Label: Rebel; Geffen; Interscope
- Songwriters: Nehemiah Harden; Jonathan Kirk; Elisner Joseph
- Producer: Damn E

SpotemGottem singles chronology
"Trap Star" (2021)	"Beat Box 3" (2021)	"Beat Box (Big Latto Remix)" (2021)

DaBaby singles chronology
"Cry Baby" (2021)	"Beat Box 3" (2021)	"Period" (2021)

Lyric video
- "Beat Box 3" on YouTube

DaBaby released his own freestyle version of the song on February 18, 2021, alongside a video in which he performs the song's dance challenge. His freestyle was worked into a remix and officially released as "Beat Box 3" on February 26.

=== Composition ===
In his freestyle, DaBaby raps about his "carefree approach to life, money, and interactions with women", while giving a shout-out to SpotemGottem. He also references YouTuber, Jojo Siwa: "Turn me up, niggas gon' see why/Nigga, you a bitch, JoJo Siwa (Bitch)". This line caused controversy as some perceived DaBaby to be dissing Siwa, however DaBaby explained that it was a play on words: "I 'Siwa' [see why] I'm not like the rest of you niggas". This is paired with DaBaby's nickname, JoJo, short for his real name Jonathan.

=== Critical reception ===
Mark Elibert and Michael Saponara of HipHopDX both called the freestyle "blazing", while Wongo Okon of Uproxx called DaBaby's contribution "braggadocios". Paul Duong of Rap Radar said DaBaby's verse adds "more fuel to the phenomenon". Jade Dadalica of GRM Daily said DaBaby delivers "some quick-paced and witty bars over the catchy instrumental".

=== Charts ===
Chart performance for "Beat Box 3"
Chart (2021)	Peak position
New Zealand Hot Singles (RMNZ)	21

== Other versions ==
Numerous rappers have remixed the song. Chicago rapper Calboy released his "Beat Box Freestyle" on January 13, 2021. Another Chicago rapper, Lil Eazzyy, released his version on February 1, 2021. Deante' Hitchcock released his version of the song on March 9, 2021. On March 11, 2021, Mulatto released a freestyle of the song which seemingly took aim at a few rappers. Two days later, rapper Renni Rucci responded with her own freestyle of "Beat Box Freestyle". On the same day, Mulatto's version was made into a remix titled "Beat Box (Big Latto Mix)". "Beat Box" was one of three songs that Polo G freestyled to in his song "For My Fans (Freestyle)", this version would later be released as “Beat Box 5”, and one of two songs that Lil Yachty freestyled to in his song "No More Beatboxing Freestyle". On March 26, 2021, a remix of the song with Jamaican dancehall artist Shenseea was released, following her freestyle version. On the same day, Dreezy celebrated her birthday with a "Beat Box Birthday Freestyle". Other rappers who remixed the song include Young M.A, Dee Watkins, and NLE Choppa. The latter's version became another official remix of the song, "Beat Box 4". On April 19, 2021 Alrahim Released a remix version "BeatBox and Beyond".

== Charts ==
=== Weekly charts ===
Weekly chart performance for "Beat Box"
Chart (2021)	Peak position
Canada Hot 100 (Billboard)	55
Global 200 (Billboard)	38
US Billboard Hot 100	12
US Hot R&B/Hip-Hop Songs (Billboard)	6
US Rhythmic Airplay (Billboard)	24

=== Year-end charts ===
Year-end chart performance for "Beat Box"
Chart (2021)	Position
Global 200 (Billboard)	165
US Billboard Hot 100	44
US Hot R&B/Hip-Hop Songs (Billboard)	14

== Certifications ==
Certifications for "Beat Box"
Region	Certification	Certified units/sales
United States (RIAA)	2× Platinum	2,000,000^{‡}
^{‡} Sales+streaming figures based on certification alone.
