= Go (Moneybagg Yo song) =

Promotional single by Moneybagg Yo and Big30

from the album A Gangsta's Pain
- Released: April 14, 2021
- Genre: Hip hop
- Length: 2:03
- Label: Roc Nation; CMG; Bread Gang; N-Less; Interscope
- Songwriters: Demario White Jr.; Rodney Wright, Jr.; Jorres Nelson; Jeffery Jones, Jr.; Aaron Butler
- Producers: RealRed; Foreverolling; Flex

"Go" is a song by the American rappers Moneybagg Yo and Big30, released on April 14, 2021, as a promotional single for Moneybagg's fourth studio album, A Gangsta's Pain. The track was produced by RealRed, Foreverolling and Flex.

== Music video ==
The music video for the track was released on April 26, 2021, and was directed by BenMarc.

== Critical reception ==
Jon Powell of Revolt wrote that the track gave off "aggressive, Midwest-esque vibes" and described the lyrics as "hard-hitting".

== Charts ==
Chart (2021)	Peak position
Global 200 (Billboard)	91
US Billboard Hot 100	52
US Hot R&B/Hip-Hop Songs (Billboard)	24
US Hot Rap Songs (Billboard)	18

== Certifications ==
Region	Certification	Certified units/sales
United States (RIAA)	Platinum	1,000,000^{‡}
^{‡} Sales+streaming figures based on certification alone.
