= SUVs (Black on Black) =

2021 single by Jack Harlow and Pooh Shiesty

Single by Pooh Shiesty and Jack Harlow

from the album Shiesty Season
- Released: August 3, 2021
- Length: 2:38
- Label: Generation Now; Atlantic Records
- Songwriters: Jackman Harlow; Lontrell Williams; Kevin Price; Samuel Jimenez
- Producers: Go Grizz; Smash David

Pooh Shiesty singles chronology
"Big Purr (Prrdd)" (2021)	"SUVs (Black on Black)" (2021)	"Gravy" (2021)

Jack Harlow singles chronology
"Industry Baby" (2021)	"SUVs (Black on Black)" (2021)	"White Lies" (2021)

"SUVs (Black on Black)" is a single by American rappers Pooh Shiesty and Jack Harlow, released on August 3, 2021, by Generation Now and Atlantic Records. The song was produced by Go Grizz and Smash David.

== Background and composition ==
Harlow teased the song on his social media before its release, with an Instagram snippet of him and Pooh Shiesty listening to the song receiving over 1 million views. The production contains elements of 808s, percussion and dark chords, and was handled by Go Grizz and Smash David.

== Critical reception ==
Jada Carson of Kazi Magazine wrote that the song's production "made for the perfect canvas for Jack Harlow and Pooh Shiesty to make their presence known in a flowing yet confident way", saying that "the wittiness of Pooh Shiesty gives the single an edge that he could only give". Carson also suggested that the song displays that "there's patience and more in-depth thoughts than just the surface-level perception for Jack Harlow", connecting it to Harlow's recent releases where he references "his position in this music industry" and "the doubt that people have about his rap career".

For The Fader, Jordan Darville called "SUVs (Black on Black)" a "catchy demonstration of Harlow's flexibility", and wrote that Harlow's brags "sound comfortable next to Pooh Shiesty". Writing for The Source, Shawn Grant said that Harlow and Shiesty "play off each other well for the banger that is soon to slide into your rotation". In GRM Daily, Courtney W said that, despite the differing styles of Harlow and Shiesty, "the two artists link up effortlessly on this track and go back to back on the bass-heavy production to flaunt their lavish lifestyles".

Billboard writer Jason Lipshutz contrasted the song with Harlow's previous single, "Industry Baby" with Lil Nas X, calling "SUVs (Black on Black)" a "grimier, more unforgiving affair". Lipshutz opined that the single connected Memphis and Louisville "over a rattling beat", and provided "an effective contrast of mic approaches" between Harlow and Shiesty.

== Charts ==
Chart performance for "SUVs (Black on Black)"
Chart (2021)	Peak position
Canada (Canadian Hot 100)	46
Global 200 (Billboard)	81
New Zealand Hot Singles (RMNZ)	15
US Billboard Hot 100	67
US Hot R&B/Hip-Hop Songs (Billboard)	21
US Rhythmic Airplay (Billboard)	18

== Certifications ==
Region	Certification	Certified units/sales
United States (RIAA)	Gold	500,000^{‡}
^{‡} Sales+streaming figures based on certification alone.

== Release history ==
Release dates and formats for "SUVs (Black on Black)"
Region	Date	Format(s)	Label	Ref.
Various	August 3, 2021	Digital download; streaming	Generation Now; Atlantic Records	
