= Hard for the Next =

2021 single by Moneybagg Yo and Future

Single by Moneybagg Yo and Future

from the album A Gangsta's Pain
- Released: March 26, 2021
- Length: 2:46
- Label: Interscope; N-Less
- Songwriters: Demario White, Jr.; Nayvadius Wilburn; Elgin Lumpkin; Troy Oliver; Torey Gilmer
- Producer: Torey Montana

Moneybagg Yo singles chronology
"Time Today" (2021)	"Hard for the Next" / "I Luve Me" (2021)	"Money on My Head" (2021)

Future singles chronology
"Go Crazy (Remix)" (2021)	"Hard for the Next" / "Holdin Me Down" (2021)	"Company" (2021)

Music video
- "Hard For The Next" on YouTube

"Hard for the Next" is a song by American rappers Moneybagg Yo and Future. It was released through Interscope Records and N-Less on March 26, 2021, as the second single of Moneybagg Yo's fourth studio album, A Gangsta's Pain. It samples American singer-songwriter Ginuwine's single "Differences", which is produced by Troy Oliver and appears on his third studio album, The Life (2001). The two artists wrote the song alongside Ginuwine, Troy Oliver, Torey Montana, the latter of who produced it.

== Background and composition ==
In an interview with Zane Lowe of Apple Music on March 26, 2021, the same day that the song was released, Moneybagg Yo described the making of the song. He and Future linked up in the studio and went through different unreleased songs, with "Hard for the Next" being one of them, originally titled "Patek". Additionally, he said that Future is one of his top five favorite artists. Lyrically, Moneybagg Yo is "spoiling his lover because she completes him" and Future "just wants her next boyfriend to know that he was richer than him".

== Release and promotion ==
Moneybagg Yo announced the song and release date along with its cover art through social media on March 23, 2021.

== Music video ==
The official music video was released alongside the song on March 26, 2021. It stars Moneybagg Yo, Future, and the former's girlfriend, Ari Fletcher.

== Credits and personnel ==
Credits adapted from Tidal.

- Moneybagg Yo – vocals, songwriting
- Future – vocals, songwriting
- Ginuwine – songwriting
- Troy Oliver – songwriting
- Torey Montana – production, songwriting
- Ari Morris – mixing, studio personnel
- Skywalker OG – engineer, studio personnel

== Charts ==
Chart performance for "Hard for the Next"
Chart (2021)	Peak position
New Zealand Hot Singles (RMNZ)	40
US Billboard Hot 100	49
US Hot R&B/Hip-Hop Songs (Billboard)	25

== Certifications ==
Region	Certification	Certified units/sales
United States (RIAA)	Platinum	1,000,000^{‡}
^{‡} Sales+streaming figures based on certification alone.
