= Scorpio (Moneybagg Yo song) =

Single by Moneybagg Yo

Single by Moneybagg Yo

from the album A Gangsta's Pain
- Released: November 16, 2021
- Length: 2:45
- Label: Roc Nation; CMG; Bread Gang; N-Less; Interscope
- Songwriters: Demario White, Jr.; Skywalker OG; Javar Rockamore; Christopher Pearson; Ja'niyah
- Producers: Skywalker OG; Javar Rockamore; YC

Moneybagg Yo singles chronology
"Wish Me Luck" (2021)	"Scorpio" (2021)	"Mmm Mmm (The Remix)" (2021)

Music video
- "Scorpio" on YouTube

"Scorpio" is a song by American rapper Moneybagg Yo from the deluxe edition of his fourth studio album A Gangsta's Pain (2021). It was sent to rhythmic contemporary radio on November 16, 2021, as the fourth single from the album. The song features additional vocals from American singer Ja'niyah, and contains a sample of "How's It Goin' Down" by DMX featuring Faith Evans. In the song, Moneybagg Yo raps about winning over the love of a Scorpio.

== Music video ==
A music video for the song was released on November 24, 2021. Ja'niyah is featured in the video, which sees Moneybagg Yo flirting with her and rapping on a rooftop in front of a skyline.

== Charts ==
=== Weekly charts ===
Weekly chart performance for "Scorpio"
Chart (2021–2022)	Peak position
US Billboard Hot 100	66
US Hot R&B/Hip-Hop Songs (Billboard)	19
US Rhythmic Airplay (Billboard)	10

=== Year-end charts ===
2022 year-end chart performance for "Scorpio"
Chart (2022)	Position
US Hot R&B/Hip-Hop Songs (Billboard)	58
US Rhythmic (Billboard)	43

== Certifications ==
Region	Certification	Certified units/sales
New Zealand (RMNZ)	Gold	15,000^{‡}
United States (RIAA)	Platinum	1,000,000^{‡}
^{‡} Sales+streaming figures based on certification alone.
