= All Eyes on Shiest =

Studio album by Pooh Shiesty
- Released: August 7, 2026
- Genres: Southern hip-hop; trap
- Length: 52:19
- Labels: 1017; Atlantic Records; Choppa Gang Enterprises
- Producers: B100; BeatDemons; Dez Wright; Jackson Botto; K6WYA; London Jae; Mike & Keys; Mikewavvs; Ramone Beats; Real Red; Ronald Thompson; RV RAPS; SephGotTheWaves; Squat Beats; Str8cash; Tay Keith; TP808

Pooh Shiesty chronology
| Shiesty Season: Certified (2022) | All Eyes on Shiest (2026) |

Singles from All Eyes on Shiest
- 1. "FDO" Released: December 12, 2025; 2. "Mane" Released: June 25, 2026; 3. "Last Man Breathin" Released: August 5, 2026

All Eyes on Shiest is the debut studio album by American rapper Pooh Shiesty, released on August 7, 2026, by 1017 Records, Choppa Gang Enterprises and Atlantic Records.

The album features a blend of Southern hip-hop, trap, and street rap, with lyrics centered on Shiesty's experiences, lifestyle, ambitions, and personal perspective. It includes guest appearances from several artists and continues the sound established in his earlier mixtapes and releases. The album marks his first major release since the deluxe edition of his commercial mixtape Shiesty Season, released in 2022.

The album features guest appearances from Baby Slime, Big30, GloRilla, K Carbon, Sexyy Red, and Tay Keith, who died two months before the album's release. It was supported by the lead single "Last Man Breathin", while Shiesty's previous singles, "FDO" and "Mane" featuring GloRilla, were included as bonus tracks. The album was a commercial success, debuting at number seven on the US Billboard 200 and number one on the Top R&B/Hip-Hop Albums chart.

== Track listing ==
All Eyes on Shiest track listing
| No. | Title | Writer(s) | Producer(s) | Length |
|---|---|---|---|---|
| 1. | "I'm Back" | Jackson Botto; Lontrell Williams; Ronald Thompson; Tiquan Pryor | Jackson Botto; Ronald Thompson; TP808 | 3:23 |
| 2. | "Federal Reality" | Isak Gidgard; Jorres Nelson; Williams | Real Red; Str8cash | 2:38 |
| 3. | "Reap What You Sow" | Carl Mitchell; Darnell Smith; Dennis Round; Evan Huang; Williams; Samuel Lindley; Pryor | K6WYA; TP808 | 3:38 |
| 4. | "Last Man Breathin" | Tupac Shakur; Botto; John Groover; Johnny Jackson; Katari Cox; Williams; Malcolm Greenidge; Michael R. Cox Jr.; Mutah Beale; Rufus Cooper; Pryor | Jackson Botto; Mike & Keys; TP808 | 4:04 |
| 5. | "Collecting Tears" | Dylan Taylor Cleary-Krell; Joseph Boyden; Williams; Michael Washington Jr. | Dez Wright; Mikewavvs; SephGotTheWaves | 2:32 |
| 6. | "Still on Timing" (featuring Big30) | Williams; Rodney Wright; Pryor | TP808 | 3:21 |
| 7. | "Booty Club" (featuring Sexyy Red and Tay Keith) | Brytavious Lakeith Chambers; Janae Wherry; Williams | Tay Keith | 2:24 |
| 8. | "Reckless Living" | Botto; Williams; Ramone Tyler; Thompson; Pryor | Jackson Botto; Ramone Beats; Ronald Thompson; TP808 | 2:36 |
| 9. | "CMO Freestyle" (featuring Baby Slime, Big30, and K Carbon) | Baby Slime; Kimbrya Mccraney; Williams; Wright; Pryor | | 3:06 |
| 10. | "McLaren Truck" | Williams; Pryor | TP808 | 3:10 |
| 11. | "Trip" | Ari Morris; Williams; Pryor | | 4:28 |
| 12. | "JPay & CorrLinks" | Botto; Williams; Ramone Taylor; Thompson; Pryor | Jackson Botto; Ramone Beats; Ronald Thompson; TP808 | 3:08 |
| 13. | "New One" | Christopher "Chris" Gomez; Mccraney; Williams | Beatdemons | 2:03 |
| 14. | "Bigger than the Program" | Gregory Ryan Sullivan; Williams; Pryor | RV Raps; TP808 | 3:12 |
| 15. | "FDO" (bonus track) | Williams; Pryor | TP808 | 5:19 |
| 16. | "Mane" (bonus track; featuring GloRilla) | Gloria Woods; Jaucquez Lowe; Julius Rivera III; Williams; Timothy McKibbins | B100; London Jae; Squat Beats | 3:17 |
| Total length: | | | | 52:19 |

Bonus track edition (streaming)
| No. | Title | Writer(s) | Producer(s) | Length |
|---|---|---|---|---|
| 15. | "Contraband 2.5" | Williams; Pryor | TP808 | 7:14 |
| 16. | "FDO" | Williams; Pryor | TP808 | 5:19 |
| 17. | "Mane" (featuring GloRilla) | Woods; Lowe; Rivera III; Williams; McKibbins | B100; London Jae; Squat Beats | 3:17 |
| 18. | "Reap What You Sow .5" | Mitchell; Smith; Round; Huang; Williams; Lindley; Pryor | K6WYA; TP808 | 2:22 |
| Total length: | | | | 61:55 |

Notes

- "Mane" is stylized in all caps.

== Charts ==
Chart performance for All Eyes on Shiest
| Chart (2026) | Peak position |
|---|---|
| US Billboard 200 | 7 |
| US Top R&B/Hip-Hop Albums (Billboard) | 1 |
