= Neighbors (Pooh Shiesty song) =

2021 single by Pooh Shiesty featuring Big30

Single by Pooh Shiesty featuring Big30

from the album Shiesty Season
- Released: February 2, 2021
- Genre: Southern hip-hop; trap
- Length: 2:51
- Label: Atlantic; 1017
- Songwriters: Lontrell D. Williams, Jr.; Rodney L. Wright Jr.; Christian D. Morris
- Producer: C-Mo

Pooh Shiesty singles chronology
"Guard Up" (2021)	"Neighbors" (2021)	"Money Gang" (2021)

Big30 singles chronology
"Perc Talk" (2021)	"Neighbors" (2021)

Music video
- "Neighbors" on YouTube

"Neighbors" is a song by American rapper Pooh Shiesty, released on February 2, 2021 as the third single from his debut mixtape, Shiesty Season, which was released three days later. The song features American rapper Big30 and was produced by American producer C-Mo. A music video for the song was released on February 4, 2021; it features a cameo from American rapper Lil Baby.

== Composition and critical reception ==
In the song, Pooh Shiesty and Big30 rap about keeping and using their guns, as well as their luxury, over an "uptempo synth instrumental". Aaron Williams of Uproxx wrote that Shiesty "offers up his take on the trap rap staples of choppers, racks, and work, boasting that he keeps his gun closer than a neighbor and threatening anyone 'talking gangster on the net.'"

== Charts ==
Chart performance for "Neighbors"
Chart (2021)	Peak position
US Billboard Hot 100	51
US Hot R&B/Hip-Hop Songs (Billboard)	20

== Certifications ==
Region	Certification	Certified units/sales
United States (RIAA)	Platinum	1,000,000^{‡}
^{‡} Sales+streaming figures based on certification alone.
