= Judas and the Black Messiah (soundtrack) =

2021 soundtrack albums

Judas and the Black Messiah is the soundtrack to the identically named 2021 biographical crime-drama film. Two soundtracks — Judas and the Black Messiah (Original Motion Picture Soundtrack), consisting of film score composed by Mark Isham and Craig Harris, and Judas and the Black Messiah: The Inspired Album, consisting of incorporated film songs, were released by WaterTower Music and RCA Records on February 12, 2021, the same day as the film's theatrical and premium video-on-demand release on HBO Max. The soundtrack and score received positive critical acclaim. The original song "Fight for You", which was featured in the film score album, won the Academy Award for Best Original Song at the 93rd Academy Awards.

== Judas and the Black Messiah (Original Motion Picture Soundtrack) ==
Judas and the Black Messiah (Original Motion Picture Soundtrack)

Film score by Mark Isham and Craig Harris
- Released: February 12, 2021
- Recorded: 2020–2021
- Length: 31:33
- Label: WaterTower Music

The film's score was composed by Mark Isham and Craig Harris. The Inflated Tear is a Roland Kirk track from 1968.

No.	Title	Writer(s)	Length
1.	"The Inflated Tear – Opening"	Mark Isham	0:45
2.	"News Reels"	Quelle Chris and Chris Keys	0:38
3.	"FBI"	Mark Isham	0:59
4.	"The Inflated Tear – The Car, the Club"	Mark Isham	1:14
5.	"Crowns Creeping"	Mark Isham	1:15
6.	"We Got a Rat" (alternate version)	Mark Isham and Craig Harris	1:39
7.	"How Much Money Do You Make?"	Mark Isham	0:47
8.	"Fred Visits the Crowns Church"	Quelle Chris and Chris Keys	0:38
9.	"Bill Is Recognized"	Mark Isham and Craig Harris	2:38
10.	"The Inflated Tear – Judy Has Questions"	Mark Isham	3:02
11.	"We Got a Rat"	Mark Isham and Craig Harris	1:17
12.	"We Got a Snitch"	Mark Isham	1:24
13.	"Prison Life"	Mark Isham	2:01
14.	"Jimmy Enters Store"	Mark Isham, Craig Harris, Quelle Chris, and Chris Keys	0:58
15.	"Rooftop"	Mark Isham, Quelle Chris, and Chris Keys	4:14
16.	"Rebuilding"	Craig Harris	0:51
17.	"Jake Wants Answers"	Mark Isham, Quelle Chris, and Chris Keys	0:35
18.	"Gun Battle"	Mark Isham, Quelle Chris, and Chris Keys	3:02
19.	"I'm Out"	Mark Isham	0:33
20.	"The Inflated Tear – Bill's Past Comes Back"	Mark Isham	0:37
21.	"The Inflated Tear – Fred Hampton Funeral"	Mark Isham	2:03

== Judas and the Black Messiah: The Inspired Album ==
Judas and the Black Messiah: The Inspired Album

Soundtrack album by Various artists
- Released: February 12, 2021
- Length: 65:11
- Label: RCA
- Producer: Hit-Boy (also exec.); 1500 or Nothin'; Andy R; Audio Anthem; BJ the Chicago Kid; Cardiak; Cardo; D. Brooks Exclusive; D'Mile; Dauphin Amir; DDot Omen; DJ Ayo; DK The Punisher; Dmac; Dustin Corbett; FrankGotThePack; Ghetto Guitar; Groove; J Mo; John Lam; Masego; Mike & Keys; MyGuyMars; Phoelix; Rakim; Sean C; Skywalker Og; Thx; Trackside; Turbo; Wu10

Singles from Judas and the Black Messiah: The Inspired Album
- 1. "Fight for You" Released: February 3, 2021; 2. "What It Feels Like" Released: February 16, 2021

An accompanying 22-track music album titled Judas and the Black Messiah: The Inspired Album came out on the day of the film's digital release, with songs from many prominent rappers, such as Jay-Z, ASAP Rocky and Nas, as well as a posthumous appearance by Nipsey Hussle. The Inspired Album, was later released through double vinyl by Waxwork Records on April 2, 2021. It features an original song titled "Fight for You" performed by H.E.R., who also co-wrote it with D'Mile and Tiara Thomas.

No.	Title	Writer(s)	Producer(s)	Length
1.	"Cointelpro/Dec 4" (Fred Hampton Jr.)	Fred Hampton Jr.; Wadell Brooks	D. Brooks Exclusive	3:20
2.	"Fight for You" (H.E.R.)	Gabriella Wilson; Dernst Emile II; Tiara Thomas	D'Mile	4:30
3.	"EPMD" (Nas)	Nasir Jones; Chauncey Hollis Jr.	Hit-Boy	2:33
4.	"Welcome to America" (Black Thought featuring C.S. Armstrong and Angela Hunte)	Tarik Trotter; Deleno Matthews	Sean C	3:40
5.	"What It Feels Like" (Nipsey Hussle and Jay-Z)	Ermias Asghedom; Shawn Carter; Larrance Dopson; Lamar Edwards; Michael Cox Jr.; John Groover; Quintin Gulledge; Beyonce Knowles-Carter; Lauren London	1500 or Nothin'; MyGuyMars; Rance; Mike & Keys	4:35
6.	"Broad Day" (Hit-Boy)	Hollis; Rafael Brown; Eugene Booker Jr.	Hit-Boy; Audio Anthem	2:58
7.	"Plead the .45th" (Smino and Saba)	Christopher Smith Jr.; Tahj Chandler Jr.; Benjamin Tolbert; Michael Neil	Groove; Phoelix	2:20
8.	"Somethin' Ain't Right" (Masego featuring JID and Rapsody)	Micah Davis; Destin Route; Marlanna Evans; Carl McCormick; Kelvin Wooten	Masego; Cardiak; Wu10	3:22
9.	"Letter 2 U" (BJ the Chicago Kid)	Bryan Sledge; Jairus Mozee; Christopher Goodman; Hal Davis; Herman Griffith	BJ the Chicago Kid; J Mo; Thx	3:05
10.	"On Your Mind" (Lil Durk)	Durk Banks; John Lam; David McDowell; Andrej Marko	Lam; Dmac; Andy R	2:43
11.	"Appraise" (White Dave)	Noah Coogler; Hollis	Hit-Boy	3:05
12.	"All Black" (G Herbo)	Herbert Wright III; Chandler Durham; Matthew Charles	Turbo; Ghetto Guitar	2:52
13.	"I Declare War" (Nardo Wick)	Horace Walls; Ronald LaTour	Cardo	2:31
14.	"No Profanity" (Pooh Shiesty)	Lontrell Williams Jr.; Thomas Walker	Skywalker Og	2:10
15.	"Last Man Standing" (Polo G)	Taurus Bartlett; Jahmere Tylon; James Frank	DJ Ayo; FrankGotThePack	2:08
16.	"Respect My Mind" (Dom Kennedy)	Dominic Hunn; Cox; Groover	Mike & Keys	3:44
17.	"Revolutionary" (G Herbo featuring Bump J)	Wright; Terrence Boykin; Mark Evitts; Dustin Corbett; Hollis	Corbett; Hit-Boy	3:14
18.	"Teach Me" (Sir)	Sir Darryl Farris; Andre Harris; Donovan Knight	Harris; DK The Punisher	3:11
19.	"Contagious" (Safe and Kiana Ledé)	Saif Musaad; Kiana Brown; Parrish Warrington; Diederik van Elsas	Trackside	3:39
20.	"Rich Nigga Problems" (ASAP Rocky)	Rakim Mayers; Aliandro Prawl; Darryl Washington; Desmond Wrinch	DDot Omen; Dauphin Amir	3:37
21.	"Outro" (Judas and the Black Messiah)	Hollis	Hit-Boy	1:08
22.	"Black Messiah" (Rakim)	William Griffin Jr.; Willie Clarke; Clarence Reid	Rakim	4:09
Total length:				65:11

=== Reception ===
Professional ratings
Aggregate scores
Source	Rating
Metacritic	70/100
Review scores
Source	Rating
Clash	9/10
HipHopDX	3.6/5
Pitchfork	5.5/10

From the critical reviews for the soundtrack, Metacritic assigned a score of 70/100. Clash, gave 9/10 to the soundtrack, stating a verdict: "An emphatic show of force that frequently taps into outright brilliance. As an album it's not without fault, but as a cultural event it's largely without peer." HiphopDX gave a mixed review saying "The Inspired Album could've benefited from more carefully curated content instead of some of the tone-deaf material that wound up on the project". Pitchfork stated "It's hard to believe that the bulk of the project was inspired by anything that Hampton said. Instead, it exploits his image to peddle liberation-lite Billboard hits over anything remotely revolutionary. It's not all terrible."

=== Chart performance ===
==== Weekly charts ====
Weekly chart performance for The Inspired Album
Chart (2021)	Peak position
Canadian Albums (Billboard)	32
US Billboard 200	12
US Soundtrack Albums (Billboard)	1

==== Year-end charts ====
Year-end chart performance for The Inspired Album
Chart (2021)	Position
US Soundtrack Albums (Billboard)	23

== Accolades ==
Award	Date	Category	Recipients	Result	Ref.
Academy Awards	April 25, 2021	Best Original Song	"Fight for You" (H.E.R., Dernst Emile II and Tiara Thomas)	Won	
Black Reel Awards	April 11, 2021	Outstanding Original Song	"Fight for You" (H.E.R., Dernst Emile II and Tiara Thomas)	Nominated	
Critics' Choice Movie Awards	March 7, 2021	Best Song	"Fight for You" (H.E.R., Dernst Emile II and Tiara Thomas)	Nominated	
Golden Globe Awards	February 28, 2021	Best Original Song	"Fight for You" (H.E.R., Dernst Emile II and Tiara Thomas)	Nominated	
Grammy Awards	April 3, 2022	Song of the Year	"Fight for You" (H.E.R., Dernst Emile II and Tiara Thomas)	Nominated	
Grammy Awards	April 3, 2022	Best Traditional R&B Performance	"Fight for You" (H.E.R., Dernst Emile II and Tiara Thomas)	Won	
Grammy Awards	April 3, 2022	Best Song Written for Visual Media	"Fight for You" (H.E.R., Dernst Emile II and Tiara Thomas)	Nominated	
Hollywood Music in Media Awards	January 27, 2021	Best Original Song in a Feature Film	"Fight for You" (H.E.R., Dernst Emile II and Tiara Thomas)	Nominated	
NAACP Image Awards	February 26, 2022	Outstanding Soundtrack/Compilation Album	Judas and the Black Messiah Soundtrack (Mark Isham and Craig Harris)	Nominated	
