= SpotemGottem =

American rapper from Florida

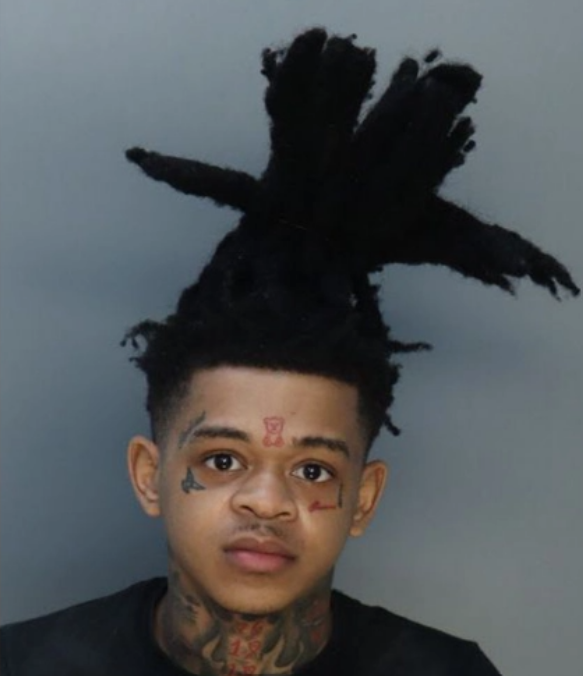
- Harden in June 2022

Background information
- Born: Nehemiah Lamar Harden; October 19, 2001 (age 24); Jacksonville, Florida, U.S
- Genres: Mumble rap; trap; drill
- Occupations: Rapper; songwriter
- Years active: 2018–2023
- Labels: Geffen; Interscope; Rebel; Ingrooves

Nehemiah Lamari Harden (born October 19, 2001), known professionally as SpotemGottem, is an American rapper from Jacksonville, Florida. He is best known for his 2020 single "Beat Box", which peaked at number 12 on the Billboard Hot 100 and led him to sign with Geffen Records, Interscope Records and Rebel Music. The labels released his third and fourth mixtapes, Most Wanted and Back From the Dead (both 2021); the former of which entered the Billboard 200.

SpotemGottem is also known for his association with Memphis-based rapper Pooh Shiesty.

== Legal issues ==
In June 2017, Harden was arrested and charged with grand theft auto and carrying a concealed weapon in Duval County, Florida.

On July 15, 2021, he was arrested for aiming a handgun with a laser sight at a Miami Marriott hotel garage attendant and charged with aggravated assault with a firearm, firearm possession as a convicted felon, and accessory after the fact.

On September 17, 2021, Harden was shot in the hip in a drive-by shooting while driving his car on the I-95 freeway in Miami.

On June 26, 2022, Harden was arrested for fleeing from the police and reckless operation of a boat. The incident happened when Harden was driving a wave runner in a restricted area. When approached by an officer, Harden weaved through parked boats and swimmers to elude the officer.

On June 20, 2023, Harden was arrested in North Miami Beach after fleeing a traffic stop. During the pursuit, Harden's Corvette collided with another vehicle, and he was found in possession of a Glock 23 modified to full auto operation with a Glock switch, and 19 rounds of ammunition. Harden has been charged with fleeing and eluding police, possession of a firearm, and burglary.

== Discography ==
=== Mixtapes ===
List of mixtapes, with selected details and chart positions
Title	Mixtape details	Peak chart positions
Title	Mixtape details	US
Osama Story	Released: July 7, 2019; Label: Say Cheese LLC; Format: Digital download, streaming	—
Final Destination	Released: December 18, 2020; Label: Rebel, Ingrooves; Format: Digital download, streaming	70
Most Wanted	Released: May 21, 2021; Label: Rebel, Geffen, Interscope; Format: Digital download, streaming	103
Back From the Dead	Released: December 24, 2021; Label: Rebel, Geffen, Interscope; Format: Digital download, streaming	—

=== Singles ===
Title	Year	Peak chart positions				Album
Title	Year	US	US R&B/HH	CAN	NZ Hot	Album
"Beat Box" (Note: Only "Beat Box 2" appears on Final Destination.) (Note: Only "Beat Box 3" appears on Most Wanted.) (Note: Multiple remixes of the song have been released, featuring Pooh Shiesty, DaBaby, Mulatto, Shenseea, NLE Choppa, Polo G, BigKayBeezy and Young M.A.)	2020	12	6	55	21	Final Destination and Most Wanted
"Federal"	2021	—	—	—	—	Most Wanted
