= Time Today =

2021 single by Moneybagg Yo

Single by Moneybagg Yo

from the album A Gangsta's Pain
- Released: February 3, 2021
- Length: 2:16
- Label: Interscope; N-Less
- Songwriters: Demario White, Jr.; Jorres Nelson; Christopher Pearson
- Producers: RealRed; YC

Moneybagg Yo singles chronology
"If You Know You Know" (2021)	"Time Today" (2021)	"Hard for the Next" (2021)

Music video
- "Time Today" on YouTube

"Time Today" is a song by American rapper Moneybagg Yo. It was released as the lead single of his fourth studio album, A Gangsta's Pain, on February 3, 2021. It was produced by Real Red and YC, who both wrote the song with him, and peaked at number 31 on the Billboard Hot 100.

== Composition and critical reception ==
The "bass heavy" song finds Moneybagg Yo rapping about gossip around him and being the center of attention, over "YC's utterly gargantuan 808 blasts". On Consequence of Sound, Eli Enis writes that the song is "essentially one long flex against Moneybagg's unnamed haters, but it's a lot more fun and bouncy than it is bitter", and that "His flow is sturdy yet flexible, and his voice has the baritone-esque oomph of rappers like DaBaby and Young Dolph."

== Music video ==
A music video for the song was released alongside the single. In it, Moneybagg Yo is followed by paparazzi in a grocery store, and he also addresses rumors about him and his haters in a press conference on a faux news channel. At home, he watches himself on television, switching between the press conference to a spoof of the TV series Girlfriends, in which he plays the role of William Dent.

== Charts ==
=== Weekly charts ===
Weekly chart performance for "Time Today"
Chart (2021)	Peak position
US Billboard Hot 100	31
US Hot R&B/Hip-Hop Songs (Billboard)	13
US Rhythmic Airplay (Billboard)	14

=== Year-end charts ===
Year-end chart performance for "Time Today"
Chart (2021)	Position
US Billboard Hot 100	76
US Hot R&B/Hip-Hop Songs (Billboard)	27

== Certifications ==
Region	Certification	Certified units/sales
United States (RIAA)	4× Platinum	4,000,000^{‡}
^{‡} Sales+streaming figures based on certification alone.
