= FDO (song) =

2025 single by Pooh Shiesty

Single by Pooh Shiesty

from the album All Eyes on Shiest
- Released: December 12, 2025
- Genre: Southern hip-hop; trap
- Length: 5:20
- Label: Atlantic; 1017; Choppa Gang Enterprises
- Songwriters: Lontrell Williams Jr.; Tiquon Pryor
- Producer: TP808

Pooh Shiesty singles chronology
| "Federal Contraband 2" (2023) | "FDO" (2025) | "BOAT (SLIMEY EDITION)" (2026) |

Music video
- "FDO" on YouTube

"FDO" ("First Day Out") is a song by American rapper Pooh Shiesty. It was released through Atlantic Records, 1017 Records and Choppa Gang Enterprises on December 12, 2025, and was later included as a bonus track on Shiesty's debut studio album, All Eyes on Shiest.

Serving as his first and only release of the year after his early release from prison after being in the middle of a sentence for over five years, he wrote the song with producer TP808. The song peaked at number 12 on the Billboard Hot 100 in January 2026, becoming his highest charting solo song to date.

== Background and composition ==
In an interview with Ebro Darden of Apple Music on December 15, 2025, Shiesty reacted to the song's success: "I expected the most, you know what I'm saying? I expected it to go crazy. I expected the whole nine, but that motherfucker [is] doing some outrageous shit". He also described its creation in an interview with XXL:

"FDO," I had to come with this particular song because it's like the message. It fit around the "I'm back" typa vibe. The thought process on it, I really was getting it together as I was in there doing my time. But I couldn't finish it because I'm getting new experiences and I'm going through new things. So, like I wrapped it up first day in the studio, with everything, the whole coming home experience. I couldn't rap in the song on how my welcome was when I came home... I did it when I came home and everything just hit me and it came out perfect.

A southern hip-hop and trap song, it sees Shiesty rapping in his regular style and cadence about his stay in prison and how he has changed. The song consists of a singular verse that also sees him name-drop several fellow American rappers, such as previous collaborator Lil Durk, Lil Wayne, and Kendrick Lamar. The official music video for the song, directed by Cotto0verdidit, was released on the same day and features a homecoming theme.

== Charts ==
Chart performance
| Chart (2025–2026) | Peak position |
|---|---|
| Canada (Canadian Hot 100) | 91 |
| Global 200 (Billboard) | 63 |
| New Zealand Hot Singles (RMNZ) | 19 |
| US Billboard Hot 100 | 12 |
| US Hot R&B/Hip-Hop Songs (Billboard) | 1 |

== Certifications ==
| Region | Certification | Certified units/sales |
|---|---|---|
| United States (RIAA) | Platinum | 1,000,000^{‡} |
^{‡} Sales+streaming figures based on certification alone.
