= Big30 =

American rapper (born 1999)

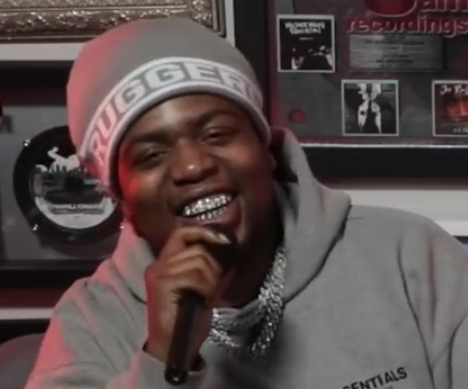
- Big30 in 2024

Background information
- Born: Rodney Lamont Wright Jr. December 28, 1999 (age 26); Memphis, Tennessee, U.S.
- Genres: Memphis rap; trap
- Occupations: Rapper; songwriter
- Years active: 2018–present
- Labels: N-Less; Bread Gang; Interscope

Rodney Lamont Wright Jr. (born December 28, 1999), better known by his stage name Big30 (stylized as BIG30), is an American rapper from Memphis, Tennessee. He is best known for his guest appearance on fellow Memphis rapper Pooh Shiesty's 2021 single "Neighbors", which peaked at number 51 on the Billboard Hot 100. Big30's debut mixtape, King of Killbranch (2021) includes guest appearances from Lil Durk, Future, Quavo, Moneybagg Yo, Pooh Shiesty, Big Homiie G, Yo Gotti, and Offset.

== Controversies ==
=== Feuds ===
In June 2020, rapper Gucci Mane called out Wright for allegedly posting him on his Instagram account multiple times, claiming that they only met once. Wright did not respond. The beef was squashed shortly thereafter, with Wright appearing on Gucci Mane's 2021 single, "Shit Crazy".

=== Legal issues ===
In October 2020, Wright was arrested in Birmingham, Alabama, along with the driver, who was identified as Leaton Foster of Decatur, Georgia. The two were traveling from Memphis, Tennessee to Atlanta, Georgia with more than $17,000 in cash, a loaded handgun, promethazine, codeine, and packaged cannabis. Wright was charged with first-degree possession of marijuana, possession of drug paraphernalia, and being a felon in possession of firearm, along with other federal charges.

In April 2026, Wright and eight other men, including Pooh Shiesty, were arrested in connection with the alleged ambush and robbery of several music industry individuals, including rapper Gucci Mane, on January 10, 2026, in Dallas, Texas. All nine defendants were charged with kidnapping and conspiracy to commit kidnapping.

== Discography ==
=== Studio albums ===
List of albums
Title	Album details	Peak chart positions
Title	Album details	US
Last Man Standing	Released: September 30, 2022; Label: N-Less, Bread Gang, Interscope; Format: Digital download, streaming	104
Still King	Released: May 17, 2024; Label: N-Less, Connect Music; Format: Digital download, streaming	—

=== Mixtapes ===
List of mixtapes
Title	Mixtape details	Peak chart positions
Title	Mixtape details	US
King of Killbranch	Released: September 2, 2021; Label: N-Less, Bread Gang, Interscope; Format: Digital download, streaming	13

=== Compilation albums ===
List of albums
Title	Album details
We Connected	Released: December 8, 2023; Label: N-Less, Connect Music; Format: Digital download, streaming

=== Singles ===
==== As lead artist ====
Title	Year	Peak chart positions			Certifications	Album
Title	Year	US	US R&B/HH	US Rap	Certifications	Album
"Allegations" (featuring Pooh Shiesty)	2020	—	—	—	RIAA: Gold	King of Killbranch
"Opp Pacc"	2020	—	—	—		King of Killbranch
"Shots Out the Vette"	2020	—	—	—		King of Killbranch
"Go" (with Moneybagg Yo)	2021	52	24	18	RIAA: Platinum	A Gangsta's Pain
"Too Official" (featuring Yo Gotti)	2021	—	—	—		King of Killbranch
"Mista"	2021	—	—	—		King of Killbranch
"Protest"	2022	—	—	—		Last Man Standing
"Dead Guyz"	2022	—	—	—		Last Man Standing
"Scared of Us" (featuring Hotboii)	2022	—	—	—		Last Man Standing
"On My Mama"	2022	—	—	—		Last Man Standing

==== As featured artist ====
Title	Year	Peak chart positions		Certifications	Album
Title	Year	US	US R&B/HH	Certifications	Album
"ABCGE" (Pooh Shiesty featuring Big30)	2020	—	—		So Icy Summer
"Monday to Sunday" (Pooh Shiesty featuring Lil Baby and Big30)	2020	—	—	RIAA: Platinum	So Icy Summer
"Water" (Dee Mula featuring Big30)	2020	—	—		Respect
"Neighbors" (Pooh Shiesty featuring Big30)	2021	51	20	RIAA: 2× Platinum	Shiesty Season
"Shit Crazy" (Gucci Mane featuring Big30)	2021	— (Note: "Shit Crazy" did not chart on the Hot 100, but did peak at number 6 on the Bubbling Under Hot 100 chart.)	—	RIAA: Gold	Ice Daddy

=== Other charted and certified songs ===
Title	Year	Peak chart positions	Certifications	Album
Title	Year	US Bub.	Certifications	Album
"SRT" (Moneybagg Yo featuring Pooh Shiesty and Big30)	2020	—	RIAA: Gold	Code Red
"Making a Mess" (Pooh Shiesty featuring Veeze and Big30)	2021	23	RIAA: Gold	Shiesty Season

=== Guest appearances ===
Title	Year	Other artist(s)	Album
"SRT"	2020	Moneybagg Yo, Pooh Shiesty	Code Red
"1017 Freestyle"	2020	Gucci Mane, Pooh Shiesty, Foogiano	So Icy Gang Vol. 1
"Holmes"	2020	Gucci Mane, Pooh Shiesty	So Icy Gang Vol. 1
"Took Down"	2021	Only the Family, Doodie Lo	Loyal Bros
"Poppin Out"	2021	Nardo Wick	Who Is Nardo Wick?
"In My Field"	2022	Hotboii	Blinded By Death
"High Hopes"	2023	Trippie Redd	Mansion Musik
