= Wockesha =

2021 single by Moneybagg Yo

Single by Moneybagg Yo

from the album A Gangsta's Pain
- Released: August 10, 2021
- Length: 3:01
- Label: Roc Nation; CMG; Bread Gang; N-Less; Interscope
- Songwriters: Demario White, Jr.; Mark DeBarge; Etterlene Jordan; Jorres Nelson; Christopher Pearson; Javar Rockamore
- Producers: Real Red; YC; Rockamore

Moneybagg Yo singles chronology
"Is It Over?" (2021)	"Wockesha" (2021)	"Wockesha (Remix)" (2021)

Music video
- "Wockesha" on YouTube

"Wockesha" is a song by American rapper Moneybagg Yo. It was sent to rhythmic contemporary radio on August 10, 2021, as the third single from his fourth studio album, A Gangsta's Pain. He wrote the song alongside Mark and Bunny DeBarge, and producers Real Red, YC, and Javar Rockamore. An official remix of the song, featuring Lil Wayne and Ashanti, was released on September 22, 2021.

== Background and composition ==
The track samples the 1983 song "Stay with Me" by DeBarge, as well as Lil Wayne's 2009 interview with Tim Westwood. The song is an ode to lean; Moneybagg Yo describes his addiction to it ("One minute I'm done with you, the next one I be runnin' back / Go your way, I go my way but somehow we be still attached").

== Music video ==
The official music video for the track premiered on June 30, 2021. It features a cameo from Lil Wayne, who appears in the beginning of the video, mixing a cup of lean while voicing his sampled speech. In the visual, Moneybagg Yo has a relationship with a styrofoam cup that periodically transforms into a woman.

== Critical reception ==
Josh Svetz of HipHopDX called the track "somber" and "heart-wrenching".

== Charts ==
=== Weekly charts ===
Chart performance for "Wockesha"
Chart (2021)	Peak position
Global 200 (Billboard)	58
New Zealand Hot Singles (RMNZ)	15
US Billboard Hot 100	20
US Hot R&B/Hip-Hop Songs (Billboard)	7
US Rhythmic Airplay (Billboard)	8

=== Year-end charts ===
Year-end chart performance for "Wockesha"
Chart (2021)	Position
US Billboard Hot 100	42
US Hot R&B/Hip-Hop Songs (Billboard)	15
US Rhythmic (Billboard)	49

== Certifications ==
Region	Certification	Certified units/sales
New Zealand (RMNZ)	Gold	15,000^{‡}
United States (RIAA)	4× Platinum	4,000,000^{‡}
^{‡} Sales+streaming figures based on certification alone.

== Release history ==
Country	Date	Format	Label	Ref.
Various	April 23, 2021	Digital download; streaming	Roc Nation; CMG; Bread Gang; N-Less; Interscope	
United States	August 10, 2021	Rhythmic contemporary radio	Roc Nation; CMG; Bread Gang; N-Less; Interscope	
