= Shiesty Season =

Mixtape by Pooh Shiesty
- Released: February 5, 2021
- Genres: Southern hip-hop; trap
- Length: 49:53
- Labels: Atlantic; 1017
- Producers: Abaz; BangaTheProducer; CMO; DocPlayboi; DreBeats; Jordanprodit; Nick Seeley; Nile Waves; Selfmade Retro; Skywalker OG; SoulSoundz; Tay Keith; TP808; Tugga; X-Plosive; YC; L3no Loaded

Pooh Shiesty chronology
Shiesty Season (2021)	All Eyes on Shiest (2026)

Singles from Shiesty Season
- 1. "Back in Blood" Released: November 6, 2020; 2. "Guard Up" Released: January 15, 2021; 3. "Neighbors" Released: February 3, 2021; 4. "SUVs (Black on Black)" Released: August 3, 2021

Professional ratings
Review scores
Source	Rating
AllMusic	3.5/5 stars
RapReviews	6/10
Pitchfork	7.0/10

Shiesty Season is the debut commercial mixtape by American rapper Pooh Shiesty. It was released through Atlantic Records and 1017 Records on February 5, 2021. The mixtape features guest appearances from Lil Durk, Gucci Mane, Big30, 21 Savage, Veeze, Foogiano, Lil Hank, Choppa Wop, and Tay Keith. The "Spring Deluxe" edition was released on May 21 and features additional guest appearances from G Herbo, No More Heroes, and Lil Baby. The "Certified" edition of the mixtape was released on April 29, 2022, and features additional guest appearances from Gunna, Moneybagg Yo, EST Gee, Big Scarr, 42 Dugg, Baby K, Lil Uzi Vert, Fat Wizza, and Jack Harlow. A Southern hip-hop and trap mixtape, it debuted at number three on the Billboard 200.

== Background and promotion ==
On January 15, 2021, Pooh Shiesty announced the mixtape, alongside its cover art and the release of the single "Guard Up". Following its release, Shiesty stated that it was "well overdue and well anticipated". It was released less than a year after he signed to Gucci Mane's 1017 Records, due to the success of his viral track "Shiesty Summer". Prior to its release, Shiesty had released various singles through the label and appeared on the label compilation So Icy Summer.

According to Shiesty, the mixtape sees him "switching it up a lot. I got songs from every genre". In an interview with Zane Lowe, he said, "You getting Big Shiest on this mixtape — I'm touching on all categories. Expect me getting versatile. It's lit. You can expect some big features, shooting a video to every song on there. We're going all the way up". Stereogum's Tom Breihan said the mixtape contains "eerie beats, weirdly catchy death-threats, tons of atmosphere. Rather than shooting for crossover ubiquity, Pooh is doing one thing really well"; as noted by The Fader's Jordan Darville, the mixtape mainly sees Pooh Shiesty "display a slouched flow hinting at an effortlessness to his skills", as he details his heavy weaponry and his love for guns in his signature Memphis drawl. Shiesty stated, "I got big features, big producers on here and I got my main producers I been rocking with".

== Singles ==
On November 6, 2020, Shiesty released the mixtape's lead single, "Back in Blood", featuring fellow American rapper Lil Durk, which became his first Billboard Hot 100 entry, peaking at number 13 on the chart. "Guard Up" was released as the second single along with the announcement of the project on January 15, 2021. "Neighbors", featuring fellow American rapper Big30, was released as the third single on February 3. Shiesty released a collaboration with fellow American rapper Jack Harlow titled "SUVs (Black on Black)" as the first single from the "Certified" edition of the album on August 3, 2021. "Twerksum" also appears on the album, which was released as a single from Shiesty's label boss, fellow American rapper Gucci Mane's fifth compilation album, So Icy Gang, Vol. 1, on September 9, 2020.

== Commercial performance ==
Shiesty Season debuted at number four on the US Billboard 200 with 62,000 album-equivalent units in its first week of release. The mixtape also spent three weeks atop Apple Music's pre-add chart. A month later, the mixtape peaked at three on the Billboard 200.

== Track listing ==
Shiesty Season track listing
No.	Title	Writer(s)	Producer(s)	Length
1.	"Shiesty Season Intro"	Lontrell Williams, Jr.; Thomas Walker	Skywalker OG	1:47
2.	"Back in Blood" (featuring Lil Durk)	Williams; Durk Banks; Christopher Pearson	YC	3:04
3.	"Guard Up"	Williams; Tiquon Pryor	TP808	3:12
4.	"Ugly" (featuring Gucci Mane)	Williams; Radric Davis; Nile Bey; Elijah Gull	Nile Waves; DocPlayboi	3:01
5.	"Neighbors" (featuring Big30)	Williams; Rodney Wright; Christian Morris	CMO	2:51
6.	"50 Shots"	Williams; Pryor	TP808	3:00
7.	"No Chorus"	Williams; Pryor	TP808	2:23
8.	"Box of Churches" (featuring 21 Savage)	Williams; Shéyaa Abraham-Joseph; Thomas Kessler; Imran Abbas	X-Plosive; Abaz	3:05
9.	"Making a Mess" (featuring Big30 and Veeze)	Williams; Wright; Karon Vantrese; Caleb Mclean; Jorres Nelson; Walker	SoulSoundz; Real Red; Skywalker OG	3:27
10.	"Choppa Way"	Williams; Nelson	Real Red	3:07
11.	"Take a Life" (featuring Foogiano)	Williams; Kwame Brown; Daniel Tuggerson	Tugga	3:18
12.	"Gone MIA"	Williams; Pryor; Nick Seeley	TP808; Seeley	2:30
13.	"Big 13 Gang" (featuring Lil Hank and Choppa Wop)	Williams; Lil Hank; Choppa Wop; Reuben Musuluma	BangaTheProducer	2:30
14.	"Drop Some Shit"	Williams; Corey Smith III; Jerard Palacious	DreBeats; Selfmade Retro	2:35
15.	"See Red"	Williams; Pryor; Seeley	TP808; Seeley	2:30
16.	"Master P" (featuring Tay Keith)	Williams; Brytavious Chambers	Tay Keith	3:20
17.	"Twerksum"	Williams; Jordan Hawkins	Jordanprodit	3:13
Total length:				49:53

Shiesty Season – Spring Deluxe track listing
No.	Title	Writer(s)	Producer(s)	Length
18.	"Switch It Up" (featuring G Herbo and No More Heroes)	Williams; Herbert Wright III; Gold Haze; DJ Pain 1; JD Feng	Gold Haze; DJ Pain 1; JD Feng	2:48
19.	"Welcome to the Riches" (featuring Lil Baby)	Williams; Dominique Jones; Kessler; Abbas	X-Plosive; Abbas	3:12
20.	"See Me Comin"	Williams; Pryor; Krishon Gaines	TP808; BandPlay	3:08
21.	"Murder Skool"	Williams; Donovan Hardie; Josh Fleming	PabloMCR; FlemDawg	2:43
Total length:				61:04

Shiesty Season: Certified track listing
No.	Title	Writer(s)	Producer(s)	Length
22.	"Certified" (featuring Gunna)	Williams; Sergio Kitchens; James Maddocks; Malita Rice; Milan Modi	James Maddocks; Yung Lan	2:29
23.	"Switches & Dracs" (with Moneybagg Yo featuring Lil Durk and EST Gee)	Williams; DeMario White, Jr.; Banks; George Albert Stone III; Devonte Richmond; Maliki Decampos; Basil von Stietencron; Oriel Bitton	DJ Bandz; DJ FMCT; Basobeats; Bitton	2:48
24.	"No Clues" (featuring Big Scarr)	Williams; Alexander Woods; Pryor	Skywalker OG; TP808	3:14
25.	"Squeeze On Em" (featuring 42 Dugg)	Williams; Dion Hayes; Wesley Glass	Wheezy	2:13
26.	"Narcos" (featuring Baby K)	Williams; Jorres Nelson; Evergreen	EVRGRN; RealRed	2:42
27.	"Next Up" (featuring Lil Uzi Vert and Gucci Mane)	Williams; Symere Woods; Davis; Brandon Veal; John Klovee	Brandon Finessin; Astrid	3:13
28.	"It's Up" (featuring Big30)	Williams; Wright; Brytavious Lakeith Chambers	Tay Keith	2:04
29.	"Hunting Opps" (featuring Fat Wizza)	Williams; Fat Wizza; Jashon Barnhill	Snoopiiondabeat	3:02
30.	"7.62 God (Reloaded)" (featuring Big30 and EST Gee)	Williams; Wright; Stone; Pryor	TP808	3:32
31.	"SUVs (Black on Black)" (with Jack Harlow)	Williams; Jackman Harlow; Kevin Price; Samuel Jimenez; Nickie Jon Pabón	Smash David; Go Grizzly; Pabón	2:37
Total length:				92:00

== Personnel ==
- Skywalker OG – mixing, mastering (tracks 1, 2, 4–11, 13–16)
- Harry Chaplin – mixing, mastering, guitar (track 3)
- Eddie "eMIX" Hernandez – recording (track 4)
- Nick Seeley – bass (tracks 14, 15), guitar (tracks 14, 15), bass guitar (track 14), mellotron (track 14), percussion (track 14), strings (track 14), piano (track 15), additional drums (tracks 14, 15), additional vocals (track 15)
- Holly Seeley – additional vocals (track 15)

== Charts ==
=== Weekly charts ===
Weekly chart performance for Shiesty Season
Chart (2021)	Peak position
Canadian Albums (Billboard)	31
US Billboard 200	3
US Top R&B/Hip-Hop Albums (Billboard)	2

=== Year-end charts ===
2021 year-end chart performance for Shiesty Season
Chart (2021)	Position
US Billboard 200	37
US Top R&B/Hip-Hop Albums (Billboard)	17

2022 year-end chart performance for Shiesty Season
Chart (2022)	Position
US Billboard 200	83
US Top R&B/Hip-Hop Albums (Billboard)	70

== Certifications ==
Certifications for Shiesty Season
Region	Certification	Certified units/sales
United States (RIAA)	Platinum	1,000,000^{‡}
^{‡} Sales+streaming figures based on certification alone.
