= A Gangsta's Pain =

2021 album by Moneybagg Yo

Studio album by Moneybagg Yo
- Released: April 23, 2021
- Genres: Hip-hop; trap
- Length: 51:20
- Labels: Roc Nation; CMG; Bread Gang; N-Less; Interscope
- Producers: 101Slide; Blessyourobin; Bobby Keyz; C4TMB; DMacTooBangin; Evrgrn; Fatman the Great; Flex; Foreverolling; Javar Rockamore; Jay Scalez; Jee; JoelDemora; Motif Alumni; Real Red; Saint; Sheldon Ferguson; Skywalker OG; Soul Soundz; The Neptunes; Torey Montana; Twysted Genius; YC; YS Trakkz; Yung Dee

Moneybagg Yo chronology
Code Red (2020)	A Gangsta's Pain (2021)	Hard to Love (2023)

Singles from A Gangsta's Pain
- 1. "Time Today" Released: February 3, 2021; 2. "Hard for the Next" Released: March 26, 2021; 3. "Wockesha" Released: August 10, 2021; 4. "Scorpio" Released: November 16, 2021

A Gangsta's Pain is the fourth studio album by American rapper Moneybagg Yo. It was released on April 23, 2021, through Roc Nation, Collective Music Group, Bread Gang Entertainment, N-Less Entertainment, and Interscope Records. The album features guest appearances from Kaash Paige, Big30, Future, Tripstar, Polo G, Lil Durk, Jhené Aiko, and Pharrell Williams. The album debuted atop the US Billboard 200, earning 110,000 album-equivalent units, becoming Moneybagg Yo's first US number-one album. The deluxe edition with six new songs was released on October 22, 2021, with additional guest appearances from EST Gee, Pooh Shiesty, Big Homiie G, Yung Bleu, Janiyah, Lil Wayne, Ashanti, and DJ Khaled.

== Background ==
In 2020, Moneybagg Yo released two projects: his third studio album, Time Served, and Code Red, a collaborative mixtape with American rapper Blac Youngsta. Both projects debuted and peaked in the top 10 of the Billboard 200, at number 3 and number 6, respectively. The former album was certified gold by the Recording Industry Association of America (RIAA).

== Release and promotion ==
On March 12, 2021, Moneybagg Yo announced that the album was completed and ready to go with it being released in 2021, but did not have an exact release date planned. He subtly revealed the title of the album on March 26, 2021, the same day that he and American rapper Future released the single "Hard for the Next", the second single from A Gangsta's Pain. However, he revealed its title explicitly along with its cover and pre-order link through social media on April 14, 2021. The track listing was revealed on April 21, 2021, but was shared the previous day on Apple Music.

=== Singles ===
"Time Today" was released as the lead single of the album alongside the official music video on February 3, 2021. "Hard for the Next", a collaboration with American rapper Future, was released on March 26, 2021, as the album's second single. "Wockesha" was sent to rhythmic contemporary radio on August 10, 2021, as the third single. "Scorpio" from the deluxe edition was sent to rhythmic contemporary radio on November 16, 2021, as the fourth single.

The first and only promotional single, "Go", a collaboration with American rapper Big30, was released on April 14, 2021, the same day Moneybagg Yo announced the album.

== Critical reception ==
Professional ratings
Review scores
Source	Rating
AllMusic	3.5/5 stars
HipHopDX	3.8/5
Pitchfork	6.8/10

Nadine Smith of Pitchfork rated the album 6.8 out of 10, writing "At his best, the stalwart Memphis rapper excels at heart-on-sleeve, bluesy songwriting, and his new album shows him deepening and opening up." Writing for HipHopDX, Josh Svetz rated the album 3.8 out of 5, saying "Atlanta trap, Southern pain rap, etc., Moneybagg possesses an innate ability to ride on all the trending sounds and help boost a song with his presence: a welcome addition to any single."

== Commercial performance ==
A Gangsta's Pain debuted atop the US Billboard 200 dated May 8, 2021, earning 110,000 album-equivalent units in its first week, with almost all of this figure coming from streams. In its second week, the album dropped to number two on the chart, earning an additional 70,000 units. The album returned to number one on the chart in its third week, earning an additional 61,000 units.

== Track listing ==
A Gangsta's Pain track listing
No.	Title	Writer(s)	Producer(s)	Length
1.	"Memphganistan" (featuring Kaash Paige)	Demario White, Jr.; D'Kyla Woolen; Jorres Nelson; Thomas Walker; Marcus Rucker	Real Red; Skywalker OG; Motif Alumni	1:18
2.	"Just Say Det"	White; Brandon Henderson	YS Trakkz	2:24
3.	"Go" (with Big30)	White; Rodney Wright, Jr.; Nelson; Jeffery Jones, Jr.; Aaron Butler	Real Red; Foreverolling; Flex	2:03
4.	"Wockesha"	White; Mark DeBarge; Etterlene Jordan; Nelson; Christopher Pearson; Javar Rockamore	Real Red; YC; Rockamore	3:00
5.	"Shottas (Lala)"	White; Nelson; Pearson	Real Red; YC	2:02
6.	"Hard for the Next" (with Future)	White; Nayvadius Wilburn; Elgin Lumpkin; Troy Oliver; Torey Glimer	Torey Montana	2:46
7.	"If Pain Was a Person"	White; Homer Banks; Raymond Jackson; Carl Hampton; Darius Henry	Yung Dee	4:00
8.	"I Believe U" (featuring Tripstar)	White; Terrence Triplett; Pearson	YC	2:39
9.	"Time Today"	White; Nelson; Pearson	YC; Real Red	2:16
10.	"Interlude"	White; Walker; Marius Hilger; Tilmann Reuter	Skywalker OG; Saint; Blessyourobin	1:18
11.	"Free Promo" (featuring Polo G and Lil Durk)	White; Taurus Bartlett; Durk Banks; Walker; Pearson; Rockamore; Robert Reese; Sheldon Ferguson	YC; Rockamore; Bobby Keyz; Ferguson	2:59
12.	"Hate It Here"	White; Nelson; Amman Nurani	Real Red; Evrgrn	1:45
13.	"Love It Here"	White; Henry; Aiden Crane; Joel Schindler; Jon Lazri; Joseph Langston	Yung Dee; 101Slide; Jee; JoelDemora	1:29
14.	"Clear da Air"	White; Nelson; Pearson; Christian Greene	Real Red; YC; Fatman the Great	3:12
15.	"Projects"	White; Pharrell Williams; Charles Hugo	The Neptunes	2:48
16.	"One of Dem Nights" (with Jhené Aiko)	White; Jhené Chilombo; Pearson	YC	2:23
17.	"FR"	White; Nelson; Rucker; Rockamore	Real Red; Motif Alumni; Rockamore	2:27
18.	"Certified Neptunes" (featuring Pharrell Williams)	White; Williams; Hugo	The Neptunes	2:34
19.	"Change da Subject"	White; Pearson; Rockamore; Caleb McLean	YC; Rockamore; Soul Soundz	1:47
20.	"Least Ian Lie"	White; Dylan McKinney	DMacTooBangin	1:46
21.	"Bipolar Virgo"	White; Nelson; Walker; Rucker; Henry; Andre Brown	Real Red; Skywalker OG; Motif Alumni; Yung Dee; C4TMB	2:31
22.	"A Gangsta's Pain"	White; Deundraeus Portis; Shelton Scales, Jr.	Twysted Genius; Jay Scalez	1:53
Total length:				51:20

A Gangsta's Pain: Reloaded track listing adds these seven tracks to the beginning of the original album:

1. "Switches & Dracs" (featuring Lil Durk and EST Gee) – 2:13
2. "Wat Be Wrong??" – 2:11
3. "Gave It" (featuring Big Homiie G) – 2:52
4. "This Feeling" (featuring Yung Bleu and Ja'niyah) – 3:28
5. "Scorpio" – 2:45
6. "Another One" (with DJ Khaled) – 3:40
7. "Wockesha" (Remix with Lil Wayne and Ashanti) – 3:37

Sample credits

- "Wockesha" contains samples from "Stay with Me", performed by DeBarge.
- "Hard for the Next" contains samples from "Differences", performed by Ginuwine.
- "Scorpio" contains samples from "How's It Goin' Down", performed by DMX.

== Personnel ==
Credits adapted from Tidal.

- Moneybagg Yo – rap vocals
- Anjae Rayford – additional vocals (1)
- Trenten DeWick – additional vocals (1)
- Pharrell Williams – background vocals (15, 18)
- Colin Leonard – mastering engineer
- Ari Morris – mixer
- Real Red – recording engineer
- Mike Larson – recording engineer (15)
- Logan Schmitz – assistant mixer (15)
- Ben Sedano – assistant recording engineer (15)
- Morgan David – assistant recording engineer (15, 18)

== Charts ==
=== Weekly charts ===
Weekly chart performance for A Gangsta's Pain
Chart (2021)	Peak position
Canadian Albums (Billboard)	14
US Billboard 200	1
US Top R&B/Hip-Hop Albums (Billboard)	1

=== Year-end charts ===
2021 year-end chart performance for A Gangsta's Pain
Chart (2021)	Position
US Billboard 200	26
US Top R&B/Hip-Hop Albums (Billboard)	13

2022 year-end chart performance for A Gangsta's Pain
Chart (2022)	Position
US Billboard 200	62
US Top R&B/Hip-Hop Albums (Billboard)	40

== Certifications ==
Region	Certification	Certified units/sales
United States (RIAA)	Platinum	1,000,000^{‡}
^{‡} Sales+streaming figures based on certification alone.
