= What It Feels Like (song) =

2021 single by Nipsey Hussle and Jay-Z

Single by Nipsey Hussle and Jay-Z

from the album Judas and the Black Messiah: The Inspired Album
- Released: February 16, 2021
- Recorded: 2013–2021
- Genre: Hip hop
- Length: 4:35
- Label: RCA
- Songwriters: Ermias Asghedom; Shawn Carter; Larrance Dopson; Lamar Edwards; Michael Cox Jr.; John Groover; Quintin Gulledge; Beyonce Knowles-Carter; Lauren London
- Producers: Mike & Keys; Rance; MyGuyMars

Nipsey Hussle singles chronology
"Deep Reverence" (2020)	"What It Feels Like" (2021)	"Zero Tolerance" (2021)

Jay-Z singles chronology
"Entrepreneur" (2020)	"What It Feels Like" (2021)	"Neck & Wrist" (2022)

"What It Feels Like" is a song by American rappers Nipsey Hussle and Jay-Z, from the soundtrack to the film Judas and the Black Messiah. It was sent to rhythmic contemporary radio on February 16, 2021, four days after the film was released.

== Background ==
The beat of the song was produced in 2013, by Rance and MyGuyMars of 1500 or Nothin'. Horns were added to it in 2015. In 2017, strings were added to the instrumental and Nipsey Hussle recorded the hook of the song. The song was further recorded by Hit-Boy amidst the George Floyd protests.

"What It Feels Like" was originally a song recorded by Mississippi rapper Tito Lopez. Hussle's lyrics in the song were written as a featured verse. Jay-Z's verse replaced that of Lopez's and was written specifically for Judas and the Black Messiah.

NBA player LeBron James previewed the song on February 10, 2021, two days before the song was released from the soundtrack to the film.

The song opens with Nipsey Hussle rapping a verse about surviving as a rapper, also mentioning selling his mixtape Crenshaw. In the next verse, Jay-Z briefly name-drops Canadian rapper Drake and record producer 40. He then criticizes the 2021 United States Capitol attack and the manner in which white insurrectionists were treated. Jay-Z also notes being born on the same day that Fred Hampton was assassinated, a fact which he previously mentioned in the song "Murder to Excellence".

== Charts ==
Chart (2021)	Peak position
Canada Hot 100 (Billboard)	93
Global 200 (Billboard)	99
New Zealand Hot Singles (RMNZ)	5
US Billboard Hot 100	51
US Hot R&B/Hip-Hop Songs (Billboard)	20
US Rhythmic Airplay (Billboard)	23
