= Back in Blood (song) =

2020 single by Pooh Shiesty featuring Lil Durk

Single by Pooh Shiesty featuring Lil Durk

from the album Shiesty Season
- Released: November 6, 2020
- Recorded: 2020
- Studio: Savage Inc.
- Genre: Hip hop; drill; trap
- Length: 3:04
- Label: Atlantic; 1017
- Songwriters: Lontrell Williams, Jr.; Durk Banks; Christopher Pearson
- Producer: YC

Pooh Shiesty singles chronology
"Shiesty Flow" (2020)	"Back in Blood" (2020)	"Ben 10" (2020)

Lil Durk singles chronology
"Stay Down" (2020)	"Back in Blood" (2020)	"Hasta Luego" (2020)

Music video
- "Back in Blood" on YouTube

"Back in Blood" is a song by American rapper Pooh Shiesty featuring fellow American rapper Lil Durk. It was released through Atlantic Records and 1017 Records on November 6, 2020, as the lead single from the former's debut mixtape, Shiesty Season (2021). The two artists wrote the song alongside its producer, YC. The song marks the first collaboration between the two artists, and they later reunited in 2021 on Lil Durk's song "Should've Ducked", a track off of the deluxe edition of his sixth studio album, The Voice.

== Commercial performance ==
"Back in Blood" debuted at number 93 on the Billboard Hot 100. It later peaked at number 13. The song marks Pooh Shiesty's first song to enter the chart and his highest-charting song, while also served as Lil Durk's second highest-charting song, following his feature on Canadian rapper Drake's single "Laugh Now Cry Later", which debuted and peaked at number 2, it was released on August 14, 2020. On February 22, 2021, the song was certified gold.

== Live performances ==
On February 11, 2021, Pooh Shiesty performed a piano version of "Back in Blood" (without Lil Durk) alongside "Guard Up", two songs from his mixtape, live on Audiomack. He performed the two songs again live on Vevo CTRL on February 26, 2021. Shiesty performed the song on April 14, 2021, on The Tonight Show Starring Jimmy Fallon, with Durk assisting him.

== Remixes ==
Remixes of "Back in Blood" have been performed by Asian Doll, Cupcakke, Pooh Shiesty's labelmate K Shiday and Joyner Lucas.

== Credits and personnel ==
Credits adapted from Tidal.

- Pooh Shiesty – lead vocals, songwriting
- Lil Durk – featured vocals, songwriting
- YC – production, songwriting
- Skywalker Og – mixing, mastering, engineering

== Charts ==
=== Weekly charts ===
Weekly chart performance for "Back in Blood"
Chart (2020–2021)	Peak position
Canada Hot 100 (Billboard)	43
Global 200 (Billboard)	29
US Billboard Hot 100	13
US Hot R&B/Hip-Hop Songs (Billboard)	6
US Rhythmic Airplay (Billboard)	20

=== Year-end charts ===
Year-end chart performance for "Back in Blood"
Chart (2021)	Position
Global 200 (Billboard)	149
US Billboard Hot 100	39
US Hot R&B/Hip-Hop Songs (Billboard)	23

== Certifications ==
Certifications for "Back in Blood"
Region	Certification	Certified units/sales
Canada (Music Canada)	Platinum	80,000^{‡}
New Zealand (RMNZ)	Platinum	30,000^{‡}
United Kingdom (BPI)	Gold	400,000^{‡}
United States (RIAA)	8× Platinum	8,000,000^{‡}
^{‡} Sales+streaming figures based on certification alone.

== Release history ==
Release dates and formats for "Back in Blood"
Country	Date	Format	Label	Ref.
Various	November 6, 2020	CD single; digital download; streaming	Atlantic; 1017	
United States	January 26, 2021	Urban contemporary radio	Atlantic; 1017	
