= Pooh Shiesty =

American rapper (born 1999)

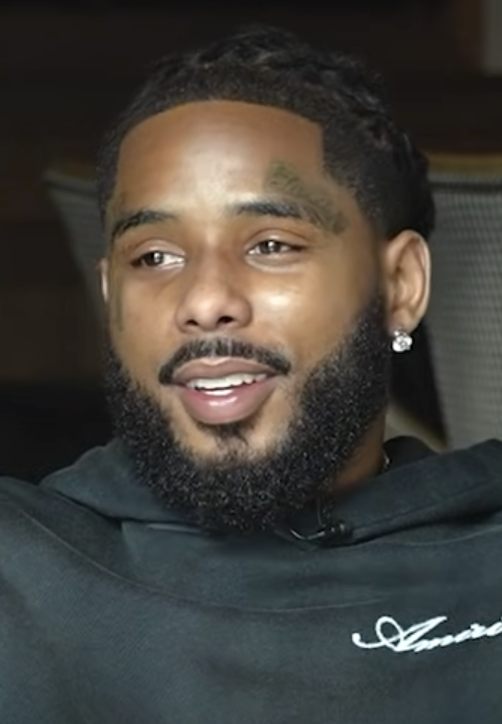
- Williams Jr. in December 2025

Background information
- Born: Lontrell Donell Williams, Jr. November 8, 1999 (age 26); Memphis, Tennessee, U.S.
- Genres: Southern hip hop; trap; drill; hardcore hip hop
- Occupations: Rapper; songwriter
- Years active: 2018–present
- Labels: 1017; Atlantic
- Relatives: Big Scarr (cousin)
- Website: poohshiestymusic.com poohshiestymask.com
- Criminal information
- Status: Incarcerated
- Criminal charge: Armed robbery • Kidnapping
- Penalty: Awaiting trial

Details
- Date apprehended: April 1, 2026
- Imprisoned at: Kaufman County Detention Center, Kaufman, Texas, U.S.

Lontrell Denell Williams Jr. (born November 8, 1999), known by his stage name Pooh Shiesty, is an American rapper. His stage name was given to him by his late brother, who adapted his childhood nickname "Mr. Pooh" with the vernacular slang term "shiesty", which he felt was referential of his lifestyle.

In 2020, he signed with fellow Southern rapper Gucci Mane's 1017 Records, an imprint of Atlantic Records, for a reported US$10 million. His 2020 single, "Back in Blood" (featuring Lil Durk), peaked at number 13 on the Billboard Hot 100. That same year, he guest appeared on the remix of SpotemGottem's singles "Beat Box", which peaked at number 12 on the Hot 100 and remains his joint-highest entry on the chart.

His debut mixtape, Shiesty Season (2021), peaked at number three on the Billboard 200. He was then sentenced to five years in prison on firearms conspiracy charges in June 2021, but was released early in late 2025. His 2025 comeback single, "FDO", peaked at number 12 on the Hot 100 and became his other highest-charting song as a lead artist, tying "Beat Box 2". Following an April 2026 break-in at label boss Gucci Mane's residence, Shiesty was arrested and charged with federal conspiracy to commit kidnapping and robbery. While incarcerated, his debut studio album, All Eyes on Shiest (2026), peaked at number seven on the Billboard 200.

== Early life ==
Williams was born on 8 November 1999 in South Memphis,Tennessee. During high school, Williams spent two years in Pflugerville, Texas and attended Pflugerville High School.

== Career ==
=== 2019–2020: Commercial debut ===
Pooh Shiesty began focusing on music at age 18. He started off his career with his debut single, "Hell Night", featuring fellow rapper Big30, which was released on March 15, 2019, followed by the official music video on February 19, 2020. "Shiesty Summer" was then released five months later, on August 20, 2019, succeeded by the music video the next day. His collaborative single "Choppa Talk" with Big30 was released on August 23, 2019, but the video was released a few months before on May 6, 2019. His final release of the year was the single "Day One" along with the accompanying visual on November 25, 2019.

On March 11, 2020, Shiesty released the single "At It Again", but the visual was released nine days prior. He released the single "Main Slime", on March 15, 2020. On May 29, 2020, the latter song received a remix with an accompanying music video, featuring Memphis rapper Moneybagg Yo and record producer Tay Keith, the latter of whom produced the original song. Shiesty released the single "ABCGE" alongside the music video on June 3, 2020.

After releasing a few singles of his own, Shiesty received attention from Atlanta rapper Gucci Mane, who later signed him to his record label 1017 Records. In a joint-venture, he signed with its distributor, Atlantic Records in April 2020. They first collaborated on Mane's single, "Still Remember", along with its music video on June 19, 2020. The song was Shiesty's rise to fame and recognition. Six days later, he released the single "Monday to Sunday" (featuring rappers Lil Baby and Big30), alongside the music video on June 25, 2020.

All three singles appeared on Mane's fourth compilation album, So Icy Summer, which was released on July 3, 2020. The first half of the album consisted of songs by Mane and the second half consisted of songs from the rest of the 1017 label; Shiesty's labelmates include Foogiano, K Shiday, Enchanting, Big Scarr, and Roboy. Shiesty and Mane reunited within the album on the latter's single "Who Is Him", with an accompanying music video the same day.

On September 9, 2020, Shiesty released the single "Twerksum" alongside the music video. The 1017 label (himself, Gucci Mane, Foogiano, Big Scarr, Roboy, K Shiday, and Enchanting) collaborated on Roboy's single "1017 Loaded", which was released alongside the accompanying music video exactly one month later, on October 9, 2020. Both singles appeared on Gucci's fifth compilation album, So Icy Gang, Vol. 1, which was released on October 16, 2020. The album is similar to the second half of So Icy Summer, but instead features different artists on the label. In November 2020, Shiesty and SpotemGottem released a remix to the latter's single, which was titled "Beat Box 2."

=== 2020–present: Shiesty Season ===
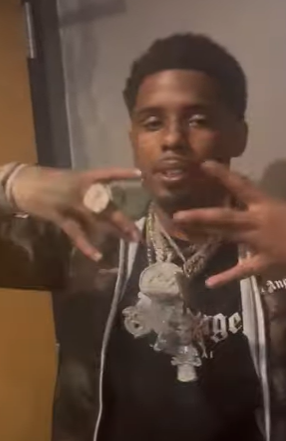
Williams' in May 2021

On November 6, 2020, Shiesty released the single "Back in Blood", featuring Chicago rapper Lil Durk. It wound up becoming his most-streamed song, and was soon succeeded by the official music video, which was released on January 2, 2021, and that was a tribute to King Von, a friend of both rappers, which appears in a scene of the cut. It has received almost 400 million views on YouTube as of February 2025. Later, he was featured on fellow labelmate Foogiano's single "First Day in LA", which was released along with accompanying visuals on November 20, 2020. It appeared on the latter's debut commercial mixtape, Gutta Baby, to which Shiesty makes another appearance on the song "Menace", which was released on Thanksgiving, November 26, 2020.

Shiesty released the single "Guard Up" alongside the official music video on January 15, 2021. It serves as the third single to his debut commercial mixtape and first project, Shiesty Season, which he announced on the same day. On January 29, 2021, he was also featured on Lil Durk's single, "Should've Ducked", from the deluxe edition of Durk's sixth studio album, The Voice, and marks the second time that the two have collaborated, following "Back in Blood".

"Neighbors", featuring rapper Big30 was released as the third single on February 2, 2021. The mixtape was released on February 5, 2021. It features guest appearances from Lil Durk, Gucci Mane, Big30, 21 Savage, Veeze, Foogiano, Lil Hank, Choppa Wop, and Tay Keith. The mixtape also includes the previously released singles "Twerksum" and "Back in Blood" as the respective first and second singles.

In February 2021, Shiesty was named "Up Now" by music streaming service Audiomack. "Thank you to Audiomack for consistently supporting me and my music," Pooh Shiesty said. "It feels great to be recognized and I appreciate all the love. It's only up from here." On May 21, 2021, the deluxe edition of Shiesty Season was released, titled Shiesty Season – Spring Deluxe. The deluxe edition includes features from Lil Baby and G Herbo. Also in 2021, he was featured on the XXL Freshman Class.

On April 29, 2022, a new deluxe edition of Shiesty Season was released, titled Shiesty Season: Certified. This bonus edition features additional guest appearances from Gunna, Moneybagg Yo, EST Gee, Big Scarr, 42 Dugg, Baby K, Lil Uzi Vert, Fat Wizza, and Jack Harlow. Shiesty was sentenced to five years in prison after being found guilty of firearms conspiracy on June 9, 2021, but was released early on October 6, 2025. He released his comeback single, "FDO", on December 12, 2025. The song debuted at No. 22 on the Billboard Hot 100, and it became his first solo song to chart.

On August 5, 2026, Pooh Shiesty announced his first studio album All Eyes on Shiest, which was released on August 7.

== Artistic influences ==
Pooh Shiesty is influenced by Chief Keef, Gucci Mane, Kodak Black, and Lil Wayne. He listened to Lil Wayne for the longest, who arguably has influenced him the most.

== Legal issues ==
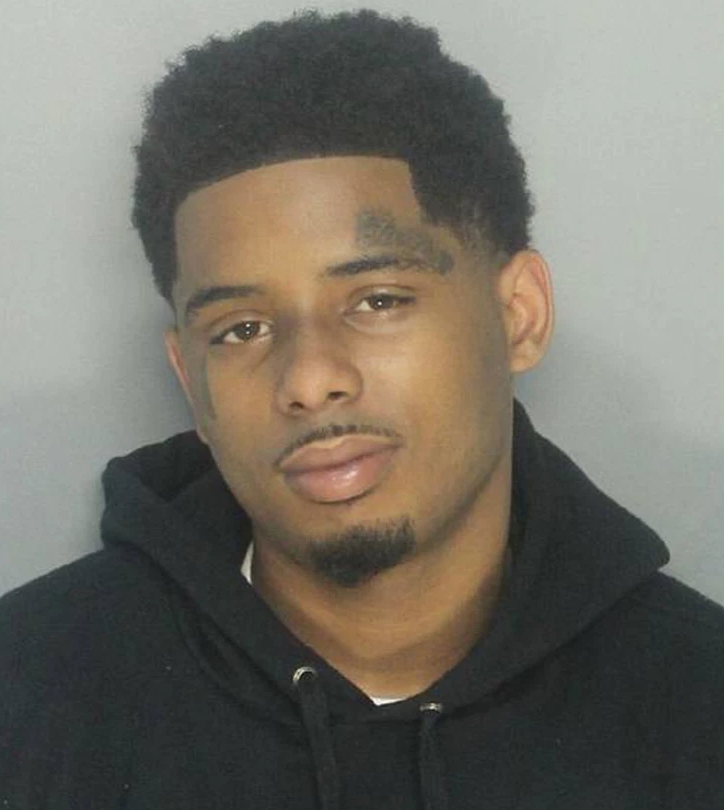
Williams' June 2021 mugshot after his arrest in Miami

On October 13, 2020, Williams was arrested in connection to a shooting in Bay Harbor Islands, Florida. He faced several charges including armed robbery, aggravated assault, battery, and criminal theft. On June 9, 2021, Williams was arrested again, this time in connection to a shooting at a strip club in Miami. He was held without bond and remained in jail, despite the victim of the shooting recanting. On June 29, he was indicted for the Bay Harbor Islands robbery, and on July 8, he was ordered by the federal judge to be held without bond, pending trial.

On January 4, 2022, Williams pleaded guilty to federal conspiracy charges; he was facing up to 8 years in prison. On April 20, 2022, he was sentenced to 5 years and 3 months in prison. He was released from federal prison early after serving only three years. He was released on October 6, 2025.

=== 2026 Gucci Mane robbery case ===
On April 1, 2026, a home belonging to Williams was raided by FBI Memphis, who stated they were executing search and arrest warrants. The following day, Williams was reported as being one of nine people arrested, including his father, Lontrell Williams Sr., and rapper Big30, across Memphis, Dallas, Nashville, and Atlanta. According to the Department of Justice, on January 10, 2026, Williams and his eight co-conspirators traveled to Dallas and allegedly robbed and kidnapped Radric "Gucci Mane" Davis, while having a business meeting to discuss terms of a business contract at a recording studio in the city. Williams and his eight co-conspirators executed an armed takeover of the studio.

During the alleged robbery, Williams held Davis at gunpoint with an "AK-style pistol" and forced him to sign a release from the contract. Williams and his conspirators then proceeded to rob Davis and the other victims of money and jewelry. According to the prosecutors, Big30 barricaded the door, preventing the victims from leaving. Williams and his conspirators were arrested and federally charged with conspiracy to commit kidnapping and robbery. A bond for the defendants has yet to be discovered. The trial has been pushed back to February 22, 2027. All defendants are facing up to life in prison if convicted of the charges.

== Discography ==
=== Studio albums ===
Title	Album details	Peak chart positions		
Title	Album details	US	US R&B/HH	US Rap
All Eyes on Shiest	Released: August 7, 2026; Label: 1017, Atlantic; Format: LP, digital download, streaming	7	1	1

=== Compilation albums ===
Title	Album details	Peak chart positions			Certifications
Title	Album details	US	US R&B/HH	US Rap	Certifications
So Icy Summer (with 1017)	Released: July 3, 2020; Label: GUWOP, Atlantic Records; Format: Digital download, streaming	29	19	19	RIAA: Gold
So Icy Gang, Vol. 1 (with 1017)	Released: October 16, 2020; Label: 1017, Atlantic; Format: Digital download, streaming	46	26	25	RIAA: Gold
So Icy Boyz (with 1017)	Released: October 15, 2021; Label: 1017, Atlantic; Format: Digital download, streaming	42	22	21	
So Icy Gang: The ReUp (with 1017)	Released: June 17, 2022; Label: 1017, Atlantic; Format: Digital download, streaming	39	19	14	
So Icy Boyz 22 (with 1017)	Released: October 17, 2022; Label: 1017, Atlantic; Format: Digital download, streaming	—	—	—	
So Icy Boyz: The Finale (with 1017)	Released: December 9, 2022; Label: 1017, Atlantic; Format: Digital download, streaming	—	—	—	RIAA: Gold

=== Mixtapes ===
List of mixtapes, with selected information
Title	Album details	Peak chart positions			Certifications
Title	Album details	US	US R&B/HH	CAN	Certifications
Shiesty Season	Released: February 5, 2021; Label: 1017, Atlantic; Format: Digital download, streaming	3	2	31	RIAA: 2× Platinum

=== Singles ===
==== As lead artist ====
List of singles as lead artist, with selected chart positions and certifications
Title	Year	Peak chart positions				Certifications	Album
Title	Year	US	US R&B/HH	CAN	NZ Hot	Certifications	Album
"Hell Night" (featuring Big30)	2019	—	—	—	—		Non-album singles
"Shiesty Summer"	2019	—	—	—	—		Non-album singles
"Choppa Talk" (with Big30)	2019	—	—	—	—		Non-album singles
"Day One"	2019	—	—	—	—		Non-album singles
"At It Again"	2020	—	—	—	—		Non-album singles
"Main Slime" (solo or remix featuring Moneybagg Yo and Tay Keith)	2020	—	—	—	—	RIAA: Gold	So Icy Summer
"ABCGE" (featuring Big30)	2020	—	—	—	—		So Icy Summer
"Monday to Sunday" (featuring Lil Baby and Big30)	2020	—	—	—	—	RIAA: Platinum	So Icy Summer
"Twerksum"	2020	— (Note: "Twerksum" did not enter the Billboard Hot 100, but peaked at number 19 on the Bubbling Under Hot 100 chart.)	—	—	—	RIAA: Platinum	Shiesty Season (Note: "Twerksum" also appears on So Icy Gang, Vol. 1.)
"Back in Blood" (featuring Lil Durk)	2020	13	6	43	—	RIAA: 8× Platinum; RMNZ: Platinum	Shiesty Season
"Guard Up"	2021	— (Note: "Guard Up" did not enter the Billboard Hot 100, but peaked at number one on the Bubbling Under Hot 100 chart.)	41	—	—	RIAA: Gold	Shiesty Season
"Neighbors" (featuring Big30)	2021	51	20	—	—	RIAA: 2× Platinum	Shiesty Season
"SUVs (Black on Black)" (with Jack Harlow)	2021	67	21	46	15	RIAA: Platinum	Shiesty Season
"Federal Contraband (Freestyle)"	2021	—	—	—	—		Non-album singles
"Federal Contraband 2"	2023	—	—	—	—		Non-album singles
"FDO"	2025	12	1	91	19	RIAA: Platinum	All Eyes on Shiest
"Mane" (with GloRilla)	2026	— (Note: "Mane" did not enter the Billboard Hot 100, but peaked at number nine on the Bubbling Under Hot 100 chart.)	36	—	—		All Eyes on Shiest
"—" denotes a title that did not chart, or was not released in that territory.

==== As featured artist ====
List of singles as featured artist, showing year released and album name
Title	Year	Peak chart positions		Certifications	Album
Title	Year	US	US R&B/HH	Certifications	Album
"Dirty Shoe" (Low Key featuring Pooh Shiesty)	2019	—	—		Street's Therapy
"Uppin the Score" (NLE Choppa featuring Pooh Shiesty)	2019	—	—		Non-album singles
"Drop Sum" (Lit Yoshi featuring Seven7Hardaway, Pooh Shiesty, and Big30)	2020	—	—		Non-album singles
"Steppin" (Action Pack featuring Pooh Shiesty)	2020	—	—		Non-album singles
"Exotic" (GlitchMan featuring Pooh Shiesty)	2020	—	—		Non-album singles
"Still Remember" (Gucci Mane featuring Pooh Shiesty)	2020	—	—		So Icy Summer
"Gym" (Big Phil GwappedUp featuring Pooh Shiesty)	2020	—	—		Non-album single
"SoIcyBoyz" (Big Scarr featuring Pooh Shiesty and Foogiano)	2020	—	—		Big Grim Reaper and So Icy Summer
"Who Is Him" (Gucci Mane featuring Pooh Shiesty)	2020	—	—		So Icy Summer
"Allegations" (Big30 featuring Pooh Shiesty)	2020	—	—	RIAA: Gold	Non-album singles
"In My Zone" (Feddi K featuring Pooh Shiesty)	2020	—	—		Non-album singles
"Chance" (LandLord Lo featuring Pooh Shiesty)	2020	—	—		Non-album singles
"Smoke Again" (DoughBoy D featuring Pooh Shiesty)	2020	—	—		Non-album singles
"Shiesty Villian" (Polo Mayesvillian featuring Pooh Shiesty)	2020	—	—		Life of a Villain 2
"Foreva Shiesty" (Tooley featuring Pooh Shiesty)	2020	—	—		Non-album singles
"Chop Pack" (BackEnd Tae featuring Pooh Shiesty)	2020	—	—		Non-album singles
"1017 Loaded" (Roboy featuring Gucci Mane, Big Scarr, Enchanting, Foogiano, K Shiday, and Pooh Shiesty)	2020	—	—		So Icy Gang, Vol. 1
"Up da Score" (6Figure Twizz featuring Pooh Shiesty)	2020	—	—		Non-album singles
"ATL Freestyle" (Bse Peso featuring Pooh Shiesty, Big30, and 60 Baby)	2020	—	—		Non-album singles
"SoIcyBoyz 2" (Big Scarr featuring Pooh Shiesty, Foogiano, and Tay Keith)	2020	—	—	RIAA: Gold	Big Grim Reaper and So Icy Gang, Vol. 1
"Baby Gucci" (BandBand Zay featuring Pooh Shiesty)	2020	—	—		Non-album singles
"Dogg Jigga" (Fresh Porter featuring Pooh Shiesty)	2020	—	—		Non-album singles
"Armed & Dangerous" (YWM Flyaa featuring Pooh Shiesty)	2020	—	—		Non-album singles
"Shiesty Flow" (32k Entertainment featuring Pooh Shiesty)	2020	—	—		Non-album singles
"Ben 10" (Bino Brazy featuring Pooh Shiesty)	2020	—	—		Activated
"First Day in LA" (Foogiano featuring Pooh Shiesty)	2020	—	—		Gutta Baby
"Invested" (ATM Big Will featuring Pooh Shiesty)	2020	—	—		Non-album single
"Cocky" (CeeFineAss featuring Pooh Shiesty)	2020	—	—		Welcome to My City
"Neighborhood Heroes" (Big30 featuring DeeMula and Pooh Shiesty)	2020	—	—		Non-album singles
"Get You Paid" (Sloppy Way featuring Pooh Shiesty)	2020	—	—		Non-album singles
"Shiesty Slide" (J.A the Artist featuring Pooh Shiesty)	2021	—	—		Non-album singles
"Money Murder & Verses" (Lil' Gutta featuring Pooh Shiesty)	2021	—	—		Non-album singles
"Ebgk" (Big30 featuring Pooh Shiesty)	2021	—	—		Non-album singles
"Back in Blood G-Mix" (J.A the Artist featuring Pooh Shiesty)	2021	—	—		Non-album singles
"Opp Music" (Caston Boy Dre featuring Pooh Shiesty)	2021	—	—		Non-album singles
"31" (Big No featuring Pooh Shiesty)	2021	—	—		Non-album singles
"Money Gang" (Big Stunt featuring Pooh Shiesty)	2021	—	—		Non-album singles
"Big Purr (Prrdd)" (Coi Leray featuring Pooh Shiesty)	2021	69	32	RIAA: Gold	Trendsetter
"SoIcyBoyz 3" (Big Scarr featuring Gucci Mane, Pooh Shiesty, Foogiano, and Tay Keith)	2021	—	—		Big Grim Reaper
"Should've Ducked" (Lil Durk featuring Pooh Shiesty)	2021	53	19	RIAA: Platinum	The Voice
"Bonnet" (DaBaby featuring Pooh Shiesty)	2022	—	—		Non-album single

=== Promotional singles ===
Title	Year	Album
"Last Man Breathin"	2026	All Eyes on Shiest

=== Other charted and certified songs ===
Title	Year	Peak chart positions				Certifications	Album
Title	Year	US	US R&B/HH	CAN	NZ Hot	Certifications	Album
"Beat Box 2" (SpotemGottem featuring Pooh Shiesty)	2020	12	6	55	—		Final Destination
"7.62 God"	2020	—	—	—	—	RIAA: Platinum	So Icy Summer
"SRT" (Moneybagg Yo featuring Big30 and Pooh Shiesty)	2020	—	—	—	—	RIAA: Gold	Code Red
"Ugly" (featuring Gucci Mane)	2021	— (Note: "Ugly" did not enter the Billboard Hot 100, but peaked at number six on the Bubbling Under Hot 100 chart.)	46	—	—	RIAA: Gold	Shiesty Season
"50 Shots"	2021	— (Note: "50 Shots" did not enter the Billboard Hot 100, but peaked at number eight on the Bubbling Under Hot 100 chart.)	49	—	—	RIAA: Gold	Shiesty Season
"No Chorus"	2021	— (Note: "No Chorus" did not enter the Billboard Hot 100, but peaked at number 21 on the Bubbling Under Hot 100 chart.)	—	—	—		Shiesty Season
"Box of Churches" (featuring 21 Savage)	2021	81	29	—	—	RIAA: Gold	Shiesty Season
"Making a Mess" (featuring Big30 and Veeze)	2021	— (Note: "Making a Mess" did not enter the Billboard Hot 100, but peaked at number 23 on the Bubbling Under Hot 100 chart.)	—	—	—	RIAA: Gold	Shiesty Season
"See Red"	2021	—	—	—	—	RIAA: Gold	Shiesty Season
"Gone MIA"	2021	—	—	—	—	RIAA: Gold	Shiesty Season
"Switch It Up" (featuring G Herbo and No More Heroes)	2021	— (Note: "Switch It Up" did not enter the Billboard Hot 100, but peaked at number two on the Bubbling Under Hot 100 chart.)	44	—	—	RIAA: Platinum	Shiesty Season
"Welcome to the Riches" (featuring Lil Baby)	2021	— (Note: "Welcome to the Riches" did not enter the Billboard Hot 100, but peaked at number 14 on the Bubbling Under Hot 100 chart.)	—	—	—		Shiesty Season
"Certified" (featuring Gunna)	2022	— (Note: "Certified" did not enter the Billboard Hot 100, but peaked at number 10 on the Bubbling Under Hot 100 chart.)	49	—	40		Shiesty Season: Certified
"Shiest Talk" (Lil Baby featuring Pooh Shiesty)	2022	58	26	—	—		It's Only Me
"I'm Back"	2026	83	17	—	—		All Eyes on Shiest
"Federal Reality"	2026	88	19	—	—		All Eyes on Shiest
"Reap What You Sow"	2026	56	13	—	—		All Eyes on Shiest
"Last Man Breathin"	2026	42	11	—	—		All Eyes on Shiest
"Collecting Tears"	2026	— (Note: "Collecting Tears" did not enter the Billboard Hot 100, but peaked at number 15 on the Bubbling Under Hot 100 chart.)	26	—	—		All Eyes on Shiest
"Still on Timing" (featuring Big30)	2026	— (Note: "Still on Timing" did not enter the Billboard Hot 100, but peaked at number 2 on the Bubbling Under Hot 100 chart.)	25	—	—		All Eyes on Shiest
"Booty Club" (featuring Sexyy Red and Tay Keith)	2026	—	36	—	—		All Eyes on Shiest
"Reckless Living"	2026	— (Note: "Reckless Living" did not enter the Billboard Hot 100, but peaked at number 25 on the Bubbling Under Hot 100 chart.)	30	—	—		All Eyes on Shiest
"CMO Freestyle" (featuring Baby Slime, Big30 and K Carbon)	2026	—	41	—	—		All Eyes on Shiest
"McLaren Truck"	2026	—	38	—	—		All Eyes on Shiest
"Trip"	2026	—	40	—	—		All Eyes on Shiest
"JPay and CorrLinks"	2026	—	45	—	—		All Eyes on Shiest
"Bigger Than the Program"	2026	—	44	—	—		All Eyes on Shiest

=== Guest appearances ===
List of non-single guest appearances, with other performing artists, showing year released and album name
Title	Year	Other artist(s)	Album
"Big Homie Shiesty Flow"	2020	Big Homiie G	Big Homiie Status 2
"Lesson"	2020	Foogiano	So Icy Summer
"SRT"	2020	Moneybagg Yo, Big30	Code Red
"How We Do It"	2020	Roboy, Gucci Mane	So Icy Gang, Vol. 1
"1017 Freestyle"	2020	Gucci Mane, Big30, Foogiano	So Icy Gang, Vol. 1
"Free Hank"	2020	Enchanting, Roboy	So Icy Gang, Vol. 1
"Holmes"	2020	Gucci Mane, Big30	So Icy Gang, Vol. 1
"Lightning"	2020	Foogiano	So Icy Gang, Vol. 1
"We Da Gang"	2020	Kvng Zeakyy	Young Nigga Shit 2
"First Year"	2020	Slatt Zy	East Lake Projects
"Menace"	2020	Foogiano	Gutta Baby
"My Dawg Solid"	2020	DMV Crank	DMV Cran
"Link Up"	2020	Lil Loaded	CripTape
"Malcom X"	2020	Hotboii	Double O Baby
"Choppaz & Bricks"	2020	Jizzle Buckz	Bigger Than Buckz
"Beat Box 2"	2020	SpotemGottem	Final Destination
"Doormat"	2021	Project Youngin	Bigger Blessings
"Trap Mode"	2021	Yg Teck	Undeniable
"Should've Ducked"	2021	Lil Durk	The Voice (Deluxe)
"Shiest Talk"	2022	Lil Baby	It's Only Me
"Who Me"	2022	Megan Thee Stallion	Traumazine

== Awards and nominations ==
Award	Year	Nominee	Category	Result	Ref.
BET Hip Hop Awards	2021	Himself	Best New Hip Hop Artist	Nominated	
