= Moneybagg Yo discography =

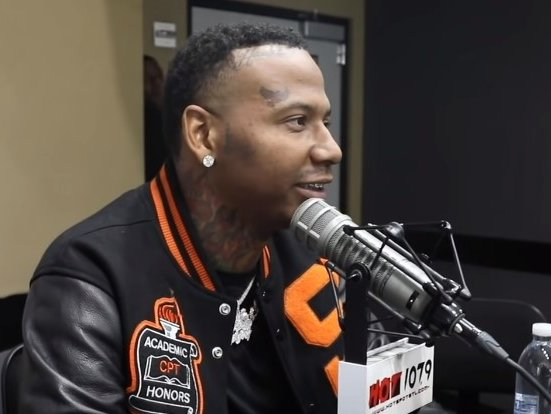
- Moneybagg Yo in 2020
- Studio albums: 5
- EPs: 1
- Compilation albums: 1
- Singles: 45
- Mixtapes: 16
- Collaborative mixtapes: 1

American rapper Moneybagg Yo has released five studio albums, one compilation album, 16 mixtapes (including one collaborative mixtape), and 44 singles (including 18 as a featured artist). His debut studio album, Reset, was released on November 2, 2018. His second studio album, 43va Heartless, was released on May 24, 2019. Moneybagg Yo's third studio album, Time Served, was released on January 10, 2020, and was certified gold by the RIAA. His fourth studio album, A Gangsta's Pain (2021), became his first number-one album on the Billboard 200 chart. His fifth studio album, Speak Now (2024), peaked at number 13 on the chart.

== Albums ==
=== Studio albums ===
Title	Details	Peak chart positions				Sales	Certifications
Title	Details	US	US R&B/HH	US Rap	CAN	Sales	Certifications
Reset	Released: November 2, 2018; Label: Bread Gang, N-Less, Collective, Interscope; Format: Digital download, streaming	13	8	8	—	US: 31,000	
43va Heartless	Released: May 24, 2019; Label: Bread Gang, N-Less, Collective, Interscope; Format: Digital download, streaming	4	3	3	—	US: 40,000	RIAA: Gold
Time Served	Released: January 10, 2020; Label: Bread Gang, N-Less, Collective, Roc Nation, Interscope; Format: LP, digital download, streaming	3	2	2	35		RIAA: Platinum
A Gangsta's Pain	Released: April 23, 2021; Label: Bread Gang, N-Less, Collective, Roc Nation, Interscope; Format: LP, digital download, streaming	1	1	1	14		RIAA: Platinum
Speak Now	Released: June 14, 2024; Label: Bread Gang, N-Less, Collective, Roc Nation, Interscope; Format: Digital download, streaming	13	3	3	62		RIAA: Gold
"—" denotes a recording that did not chart or was not released in that territory.

|Forever Hold Your Peace

- To Be Released : 2026
- Label: Bread Gang N-Less Collective Music Group Roc Nation,Interscope Records
- Formats: Digital download, streaming

=== Compilation albums ===
Title	Details	Peak chart positions
Title	Details	US
Moneybagg Yo Presents: NLess Ent x Bread Gang (with Bread Gang and N-Less)	Released: January 1, 2018; Label: Bread Gang, N-Less; Format: Digital download	—
Gangsta Art (with CMG the Label)	Released: July 15, 2022; Label: Collective, Interscope; Format: Digital download, streaming	11
Gangsta Art 2 (with CMG the Label)	Released: September 29, 2023; Label: Collective, Interscope; Format: Digital download, streaming	78

== Mixtapes ==
List of mixtapes with selected details
Title	Details	Peak chart positions				Sales	Certifications
Title	Details	US	US R&B/HH	US Rap	CAN	Sales	Certifications
From Da Block 2 Da Booth	Released: April 16, 2012; Label: Bread Gang; Formats: Digital download	—	—	—	—		
October 20th	Released: October 6, 2012; Label: Bread Gang; Formats: Digital download	—	—	—	—		
La Familia (with Slpy)	Released: February 3, 2014; Label: Bread Gang; Formats: Digital download	—	—	—	—		
Relentless	Released: June 14, 2015; Label: Bread Gang; Formats: Digital download	—	—	—	—		
Federal	Released: September 22, 2015; Label: Bread Gang; Formats: Digital download	—	—	—	—		
Federal Reloaded	Released: January 20, 2016; Label: Bread Gang; Formats: Digital download	—	—	—	—		
ELO (Everybody Lives On)	Released: June 7, 2016; Label: Bread Gang; Formats: Digital download, streaming	—	—	—	—		
All Gas No Brakes	Released: July 26, 2016; Label: Bread Gang, N-Less; Formats: Digital download, streaming	—	—	—	—		
4 the Hard Way	Released: September 28, 2016; Label: Bread Gang, N-Less; Formats: Digital download, streaming	—	—	—	—		
2 Federal (with Yo Gotti)	Released: October 31, 2016; Label: Bread Gang, N-Less, Collective; Formats: Digital download, streaming	97	48	—	—		
Heartless	Released: February 14, 2017; Label: Bread Gang, N-Less, Collective; Formats: Digital download, streaming	177	—	—	—		
Federal 3X	Released: August 11, 2017; Label: Bread Gang, N-Less, Collective, Interscope; Formats: CD, digital download, streaming	5	4	3	—	US: 30,000	
Fed Baby's (with YoungBoy Never Broke Again)	Released: November 17, 2017; Label: Bread Gang, N-Less, Never Broke Again, Collective, Interscope; Formats: Digital download, streaming	21	9	7	—		RIAA: Gold
2 Heartless	Released: February 14, 2018; Label: Bread Gang, N-Less, Collective, Interscope; Formats: Digital download, streaming	16	9	7	—		
Bet on Me	Released: August 3, 2018; Label: Bread Gang, N-Less, Collective, Interscope; Formats: Digital download, streaming	11	9	9	—	US: 26,000	
Code Red (with Blac Youngsta)	Released: September 18, 2020; Label: Bread Gang, N-Less, Collective, Epic, Interscope; Formats: Digital download, streaming	6	5	4	—		RIAA: Gold
Hard to Love	Released: June 2, 2023; Label: Bread Gang, N-Less, Collective, Roc Nation, Interscope; Format: LP, digital download, streaming	10	4	3	74		RIAA: Gold
"—" denotes a recording that did not chart or was not released in that territory.

== Singles ==
=== As lead artist ===
Title	Year	Peak chart positions								Certifications	Album
Title	Year	US	US R&B/HH	US Rap	US Main R&B/HH	CAN	NZ Hot	UK	WW	Certifications	Album
"Dirty Money" (with FDW Baybay featuring Cook Laflare)	2017	—	—	—	—	—	—	—	—		Non-album single
"50 Missed Calls" (with Ray Vicks and YFN Lucci)	2017	—	—	—	—	—	—	—	—		The Frank White Story
"Vibes in LA" (with Gunna)	2017	—	—	—	—	—	—	—	—		Non-album singles
"Trap Prices" (with Heavy Hitaz)	2017	—	—	—	—	—	—	—	—		Non-album singles
"Trap Clickin" (featuring King Pop and Benji Wilson)	2017	—	—	—	—	—	—	—	—		Non-album singles
"February" (featuring Jeezy)	2018	—	—	—	—	—	—	—	—		Non-album singles
"Celebrate" (with Lgunna featuring Jim Jones)	2018	—	—	—	—	—	—	—	—		Non-album singles
"Tetris" (with Mr. Mase and Spinna)	2018	—	—	—	—	—	—	—	—		Non-album singles
"Bigg Facts"	2018	—	—	—	26	—	—	—	—	RIAA: Platinum	2 Heartless
"Okay" (featuring Future)	2018	—	—	—	—	—	—	—	—		Reset
"Count It Up" (with Drako)	2018	—	—	—	—	—	—	—	—		Fully Loaded
"Blac Money" (featuring Blac Youngsta)	2019	—	—	—	—	—	—	—	—		43va Heartless
"Dior" (featuring Gunna)	2019	— (Note: "Dior" did not enter the Billboard Hot 100, but peaked at number 10 on the Bubbling Under Hot 100 chart.)	— (Note: "Dior" did not enter the Hot R&B/Hip-Hop Songs chart, but peaked at number 3 on the Bubbling Under R&B/Hip-Hop Songs chart.)	—	—	—	—	—	—	RIAA: Platinum	43va Heartless
"All Dat" (with Megan Thee Stallion)	2019	70	34	—	16	—	—	—	—	RIAA: 2× Platinum	Time Served
"U Played" (featuring Lil Baby)	2020	53	23	18	—	—	—	—	—	RIAA: 2× Platinum	Time Served
"1 2 3" (featuring Blac Youngsta)	2020	— (Note: "1 2 3" did not enter the Billboard Hot 100, but peaked at number 1 on the Bubbling Under Hot 100 chart.)	43	—	5	—	—	—	—	RIAA: Platinum	Time Served
"Blue Jean Bandit" (with TM88 and Southside featuring Young Thug and Future)	2020	—	—	—	—	—	—	—	—		Non-album single
"Me vs Me"	2020	88	41	—	—	—	—	—	—	RIAA: 4× Platinum	Time Served (Deluxe)
"Said Sum" (solo or remix featuring City Girls and DaBaby)	2020	17	8	7	2	88	—	—	46	RIAA: 5× Platinum; RMNZ: Gold	Code Red
"Time Today"	2021	31	13	11	1	—	—	—	70	RIAA: 4× Platinum	A Gangsta's Pain
"Hard for the Next" (with Future)	2021	49	25	18	—	—	40	—	76	RIAA: Platinum	A Gangsta's Pain
"Rookie of the Year"	2021	—	—	—	—	—	—	—	—	RIAA: Gold	Non-album single
"Wockesha"	2021	20	7	5	1	—	15	—	58	RIAA: 4× Platinum; RMNZ: Gold	A Gangsta's Pain
"Scorpio"	2021	66	19	11	1	—	—	—	—	RIAA: Platinum	A Gangsta's Pain
"G Lock" (with Digga D)	2022	—	—	—	—	—	—	48	—		Noughty by Nature
"Wig" (with DaBaby)	2022	—	—	—	—	—	—	—	—		Non-album single
"Rocky Road" (with Kodak Black)	2022	— (Note: "Rocky Road" did not enter the Billboard Hot 100, but peaked at number eight on the Bubbling Under Hot 100 chart.)	38	—	—	—	—	—	—		Gangsta Art
"See Wat I'm Sayin"	2022	59	14	13	10	—	—	—	—	RIAA: Gold	Gangsta Art
"Code" (with Offset)	2022	— (Note: "Code" did not enter the Billboard Hot 100, but peaked at number 12 on the Bubbling Under Hot 100 chart.)	42	—	—	—	—	—	—		Non-album singles
"Blow"	2022	96	27	19	—	—	—	—	—		Non-album singles
"Quickie"	2022	— (Note: "Quickie" did not enter the Billboard Hot 100, but peaked at number 1 on the Bubbling Under Hot 100 chart.)	49	—	—	—	—	—	—	RIAA: Platinum; RMNZ: Gold	Hard to Love
"On Wat U On" (with GloRilla)	2023	56	21	9	—	—	—	—	—	RIAA: Platinum	Hard to Love
"Shot Off Gumbo" (with YTB Fatt and Fat Wizza)	2023	—	—	—	—	—	—	—	—		Hard to Love
"Motion God"	2023	— (Note: "Motion God" did not enter the Billboard Hot 100, but peaked at number 12 on the Bubbling Under Hot 100 chart.)	38	—	—	—	—	—	—	RIAA: Gold	Hard to Love
"Ocean Spray"	2023	69	26	—	—	—	32	—	—	RIAA: Platinum	Hard to Love
"Big Dawg" (with Sexyy Red and CMG the Label)	2023	—	—	—	—	—	—	—	—		Gangsta Art 2
"Bussin" (with Rob49)	2024	— (Note: "Bussin" did not enter the Billboard Hot 100, but peaked at number three on the Bubbling Under Hot 100 chart.)	44	—	—	—	—	—	—	RIAA: Gold	Speak Now
"Tryna Make Sure"	2024	— (Note: "Tryna Make Sure" did not enter the Billboard Hot 100, but peaked at number 18 on the Bubbling Under Hot 100 chart.)	38	—	—	—	—	—	—		Speak Now
"Play da Fool"	2024	—	—	—	—	—	—	—	—		Speak Now
"Whiskey Whiskey" (featuring Morgan Wallen)	2024	21	—	4	—	49	33	—	58	RIAA: 2× Platinum	Speak Now
"Feet on Land" (with G Herbo)	2025	— (Note: "Feet on Land" did not enter the Billboard Hot 100, but peaked at number 17 on the Bubbling Under Hot 100 chart.)	35	23	—	—	—	—	—		Non-album singles
"I See Why"	2026	87	22	14	—	—	—	—	—		Non-album singles
"—" denotes a recording that did not chart or was not released in that territory.

=== As featured artist ===
Title	Year	Peak chart positions					Certifications	Album(s)
Title	Year	US	US R&B/HH	US Main. R&B/HH	CAN	WW	Certifications	Album(s)
"All of a Sudden" (Lil Baby featuring Moneybagg Yo)	2017	—	— (Note: "All of a Sudden" did not enter the Hot R&B/Hip-Hop Songs chart, but peaked at number 5 on the Bubbling Under R&B/Hip-Hop Songs chart.)	20	—	—	RIAA: Platinum	Too Hard
"Don't Even Trip" (Tee Grizzley featuring Moneybagg Yo)	2018	—	—	—	—	—		Activated
"Set" (Dee Mula featuring Moneybagg Yo)	2018	—	—	—	—	—		Let Me Get Dat, Vol. 2
"Pablo (Remix)" (Rvssian and Sfera Ebbasta featuring Rich the Kid, Lil Baby, and Moneybagg Yo)	2018	—	—	—	—	—		Non-album single
"Unjudge Me" (Calboy featuring Moneybagg Yo)	2019	—	—	—	—	—		Wildboy
"Tomorrow" (Stunna 4 Vegas featuring Moneybagg Yo)	2019	—	—	—	—	—		Non-album singles
"Crank Up 2.0" (Dee Mula featuring Stunna 4 Vegas and Moneybagg Yo)	2019	—	—	—	—	—		Non-album singles
"Hocus Pocus" (DJ Kay Slay and Blueface featuring A Boogie wit da Hoodie and Moneybagg Yo)	2019	—	—	—	—	—		Non-album singles
"Goodbye" (Blac Youngsta featuring Yo Gotti and Moneybagg Yo)	2019	—	—	—	—	—		Church on Sunday
"Camelot (Remix)" (NLE Choppa featuring BlocBoy JB, Yo Gotti, and Moneybagg Yo)	2019	—	—	—	—	—		Non-album singles
"Split It" (Doe Boy featuring Moneybagg Yo)	2020	—	—	—	—	—		Non-album singles
"Main Slime (Remix)" (Pooh Shiesty featuring Moneybagg Yo and Tay Keith)	2020	—	—	—	—	—		So Icy Summer
"Hittin' (Remix)" (Money Mu featuring Foogiano and Moneybagg Yo)	2020	—	—	18	—	—		Non-album single
"I Met Tay Keith First" (Blac Youngsta featuring Lil Baby and Moneybagg Yo)	2020	—	—	—	—	—		Fuck Everybody 3
"Special (Remix)" (EST Gee featuring Moneybagg Yo)	2020	—	—	—	—	—	RIAA: Gold	I Still Don't Feel Nun
"Zero Love" (Belly featuring Moneybagg Yo)	2021	—	—	39	—	—		See You Next Wednesday
"Splash" (Tyga featuring Moneybagg Yo)	2021	—	—	—	—	—		Non-album single
"LLC (Remix)" (Money Man featuring Moneybagg Yo)	2021	— (Note: "LLC" did not enter the Billboard Hot 100, but peaked at number 10 on the Bubbling Under Hot 100 chart.)	42	—	—	—	RIAA: Platinum	Blockchain
"Mmm Mmm (Remix)" (Kaliii featuring ATL Jacob, Latto, and Moneybagg Yo)	2021	—	—	—	—	—		Toxic Chocolate
"Too Hot" (NLE Choppa featuring Moneybagg Yo)	2022	— (Note: "Too Hot" did not enter the Billboard Hot 100, but peaked at number 14 on the Bubbling Under Hot 100 chart.)	—	—	—	—		Me vs. Me
"Pop Music" (2 Chainz featuring Moneybagg Yo and BeatKing)	2022	— (Note: "Pop Music" did not enter the Billboard Hot 100, but peaked at number 15 on the Bubbling Under Hot 100 chart.)	—	10	—	—		Dope Don't Sell Itself
"Scared Money" (YG featuring J. Cole and Moneybagg Yo)	2022	73	25	15	75	176		I Got Issues
"Supercharge" (Lil Jairmy featuring Moneybagg Yo)	2022	—	—	—	—	—		GasGod 2
"Big 14" (Trippie Redd and Offset featuring Moneybagg Yo)	2022	96	37	—	95	—		Non-album single
"—" denotes a recording that did not chart or was not released in that territory.

=== Promotional singles ===
Title	Year	Peak chart positions			Certifications	Album
Title	Year	US	US R&B/HH	NZ Hot	Certifications	Album
"Go" (with Big30)	2021	52	24	—	RIAA: Platinum	A Gangsta's Pain
"Blitz" (with Tripstar)	2021	—	—	—		Madden NFL 22
"Keep It Low" (featuring Future)	2023	59	19	38	RIAA: Gold	Hard to Love

== Other charted and certified songs ==
List of other charted and certified songs, with selected chart positions and certifications
Title	Year	Peak chart positions							Certifications	Album
Title	Year	US	US R&B/HH	US Main. R&B/HH	CAN	IRE	NZ Hot	WW	Certifications	Album
"Doin 2 Much" (with Yo Gotti)	2016	—	—	23	—	—	—	—	RIAA: Gold	2 Federal
"Doin' It"	2017	—	—	21	—	—	—	—	RIAA: Gold	Federal 3X
"Change Partners" (with Moneybagg Yo)	2017	—	—	—	—	—	—	—	RIAA: Gold	Fed Baby's
"Pleading the Fifth" (with Moneybagg Yo featuring Quavo)	2017	—	—	—	—	—	—	—	RIAA: Gold	Fed Baby's
"Acquittal" (with Moneybagg Yo)		—	—	—	—	—	—	—	RIAA: Gold	Fed Baby's
"Ion Get You"	2018	—	—	—	—	—	—	—	RIAA: Gold	2 Heartless
"Wat U On" (featuring Gunna)	2018	—	—	—	—	—	—	—	RIAA: Gold	Bet on Me
"Say Na" (featuring J. Cole)	2018	—	—	25	—	—	—	—	RIAA: Platinum	Reset
"Lower Level" (featuring Kodak Black)	2018	—	—	—	—	—	—	—	RIAA: Platinum	Reset
"Relentless Again"	2019	—	—	—	—	—	—	—	RIAA: Platinum	43va Heartless
"Wat3va I'm Wit"	2019	—	—	—	—	—	—	—	RIAA: Gold	43va Heartless
"Toes" (DaBaby featuring Lil Baby and Moneybagg Yo)	2019	28	16	—	40	84	17	—	RIAA: 2× Platinum; RMNZ: Gold	Kirk
"Speak 4 Em"	2020	— (Note: "Speak 4 Em" did not enter the Billboard Hot 100, but peaked at number 12 on the Bubbling Under Hot 100 chart.)	—	—	—	—	—	—	RIAA: Gold	Time Served
"Pop My Shit"	2020	—	—	—	—	—	—	—	RIAA: Gold	Time Served
"Pistol by da Bed"	2020	—	—	—	—	—	—	—	RIAA: Gold	Time Served
"Federal Fed" (featuring Future)	2020	— (Note: "Federal Fed" did not enter the Billboard Hot 100, but peaked at number 7 on the Bubbling Under Hot 100 chart.)	50	—	—	—	—	—	RIAA: Gold	Time Served
"Protect da Brand" (featuring DaBaby)	2020	89	44	—	—	—	—	—	RIAA: Gold	Time Served
"No Chill" (featuring Lil Baby and Rylo Rodriguez)	2020	—	—	—	—	—	—	—	RIAA: Gold	Time Served
"No Sucker" (with Lil Baby)	2020	58	30	—	—	—	—	—	RIAA: Platinum	My Turn
"Brain Dead"	2020	—	—	—	—	—	—	—	RIAA: Gold	Code Red
"SRT" (featuring Big30 and Pooh Shiesty)	2020	—	—	—	—	—	—	—	RIAA: Platinum	Code Red
"Run It Up" (Lil Tjay featuring Offset and Moneybagg Yo)	2021	50	26	—	26	76	8	51	RIAA: Platinum; BPI: Gold; RMNZ: Gold	Destined 2 Win
"Just Say Det"	2021	82	34	—	—	—	—	199	RIAA: Gold	A Gangsta's Pain
"Shottas (Lala)"	2021	35	14	—	89	—	38	54	RIAA: Platinum	A Gangsta's Pain
"If Pain Was a Person"	2021	54	26	—	—	—	—	119	RIAA: Platinum	A Gangsta's Pain
"I Believe U" (featuring Tripstar)	2021	— (Note: "I Believe U" did not enter the Billboard Hot 100, but peaked at number 10 on the Bubbling Under Hot 100 chart.)	48	—	—	—	—	—		A Gangsta's Pain
"Free Promo" (featuring Polo G and Lil Durk)	2021	80	32	—	—	—	—	171		A Gangsta's Pain
"Hate It Here"	2021	— (Note: "Hate It Here" did not enter the Billboard Hot 100, but peaked at number nine on the Bubbling Under Hot 100 chart.)	47	—	—	—	—	—		A Gangsta's Pain
"Love It Here"	2021	— (Note: "Love It Here" did not enter the Billboard Hot 100, but peaked at number eight on the Bubbling Under Hot 100 chart.)	46	—	—	—	—	—	RIAA: Platinum	A Gangsta's Pain
"Clear da Air"	2021	100	40	—	—	—	—	—	RIAA: Gold	A Gangsta's Pain
"Projects"	2021	— (Note: "Projects" did not enter the Billboard Hot 100, but peaked at number 13 on the Bubbling Under Hot 100 chart.)	—	—	—	—	—	—	RIAA: Gold	A Gangsta's Pain
"One of Dem Nights" (with Jhené Aiko)	2021	— (Note: "One of Dem Nights" did not enter the Billboard Hot 100, but peaked at number 12 on the Bubbling Under Hot 100 chart.)	50	—	—	—	—	—	RIAA: Gold	A Gangsta's Pain
"Hot" (Meek Mill featuring Moneybagg Yo)	2021	60	20	—	—	—	39	112		Expensive Pain
"Switches & Dracs" (featuring Lil Durk and EST Gee)	2021	69	25	—	—	—	—	—	RIAA: Gold	A Gangsta's Pain (Reloaded)
"Start Up Again" (Polo G featuring Moneybagg Yo)	2021	94	31	—	—	—	—	—		Hall of Fame 2.0
"Trust Nothing" (King Von featuring Moneybagg Yo)	2022	97	37	—	—	—	—	—		What It Means to Be King
"Hear It Back" (Lil Durk featuring Moneybagg Yo)	2022	— (Note: "Hear It Back" did not enter the Billboard Hot 100, but peaked at number eight on the Bubbling Under Hot 100 chart.)	39	—	—	—	—	—	RIAA: Gold	7220 (Deluxe)
"They Say"	2023	— (Note: "They Say" did not enter the Billboard Hot 100, but peaked at number 15 on the Bubbling Under Hot 100 chart.)	48	—	—	—	—	—		Hard to Love
"F My BM"	2023	— (Note: "F My BM" did not enter the Billboard Hot 100, but peaked at number eight on the Bubbling Under Hot 100 chart.)	46	—	—	—	—	—	RIAA: Gold	Hard to Love
"All Dere" (GloRilla feat. Moneybagg Yo)	2024	—	—	—	—	—	—	—	RIAA: Gold	Ehhthang Ehhthang
"—" denotes a recording that did not chart or was not released in that territory.
