= Lance Taylor =

Lance Taylor may refer to:

- Lance Taylor (American football), American gridiron football coach
- Lance Taylor (economist), American structuralist macroeconomist
- Lance Taylor (footballer) (born 1952), Australian rules footballer
- OG Boo Dirty, an American rapper named Lance Taylor
- Afrika Bambaataa (1957–2026), American disc jockey, rapper and record producer
