= I Got Issues =

Studio album by YG
- Released: September 30, 2022
- Length: 48:39
- Label: 4Hunnid; Def Jam
- Producer: 18YOMAN; Ambiance Sound; Bandz; Bankroll Got It; Bijan Amir; Blake Straus; Corbett; DJ Vision; Franchisedidit; Gibbo; Hit-Boy; Iceberg; Kofo; Larry Jayy; Layz; Len20; Lil Rich; Mike Crook; MixMP; Nami; Nik Dean; Reece Beats; Snipe Young; Swish; Tee-Watt; Terrace Martin; Tom Levesque; Ty Leon

YG chronology
| Kommunity Service (2021) | I Got Issues (2022) | Hit Me When U Leave the Klub: The Playlist (2023) |

Singles from I Got Issues
- 1. "Scared Money" Released: February 4, 2022; 2. "Toxic" Released: August 12, 2022; 3. "Alone" Released: September 9, 2022; 4. "Maniac" Released: September 23, 2022

I Got Issues (stylised in all caps) is the sixth studio album by American rapper YG. It was released through Def Jam Recordings and 4Hunnid Records on September 30, 2022. The album features guest appearances from Mozzy, D3szn Duki, Cuco, J. Cole, Moneybagg Yo, H.E.R., Roddy Ricch, Post Malone, and Nas. Production was handled by a variety of record producers, including Bijan Amir, Larry Jayy, Reece Beats, Ambiance Sound, DJ Vision, Swish, Mike Crook, Blake Straus, Tom Levesque, Gibbo, Snipe Young, 18YOMAN, and Lil Rich, among others.

== Background ==
The album was originally called Pray for Me before being changed to I Got Issues. Through a video posted to Instagram in September 2022 during the release week, YG commented on the album:

The album I Got Issues is basically insight on my life, an update on my life. I feel like my people haven't heard from me in a real way, in a long time. So I'm giving them this album…I'm here with all my issues, you know what I'm sayin'?

== Release and promotion ==
On September 1, 2022, YG announced the title of the album and its release date and he shared its cover art. The pre-order was available on Apple Music on September 9, 2022. The tracklist was revealed a few weeks later through its pre-order.

=== Singles ===
The lead single of the album, "Scared Money", which features fellow American rappers J. Cole and Moneybagg Yo, was released on February 4, 2022. The second single, "Toxic", was released on August 12, 2022. The third single, "Alone", was released along with the pre-order of the album on September 9, 2022. The fourth and final single, "Maniac", was released on September 23, 2022.

== Critical reception ==
Professional ratings
Aggregate scores
| Source | Rating |
|---|---|
| Metacritic | 58/100 |
Review scores
| Source | Rating |
| AllMusic | 2.5/5 stars |
| Clash | 7/10 |
| Legends Will Never Die | 3/5 stars |
| Pitchfork | 5.8/10 |
| Slant Magazine | 3/5 stars |

AllMusic criticized the album "YG's bouncing between styles gives I Got Issues a scattered flow that pushes the best tracks to the forefront and makes the weaker material feel all the more tedious."

== Track listing ==
I Got Issues track listing
| No. | Title | Writer(s) | Producer(s) | Length |
|---|---|---|---|---|
| 1. | "Issues" | Keenon Jackson; Bijan Amirkhani; Dejan Nikolic; Dylan Berg; Kelton Scott II | Bijan Amir; Nik Dean; Iceberg; Franchisedidit | 2:20 |
| 2. | "Baby Momma" | K. Jackson; Larry Sanders; Randy Holmes; Catelyn Sparks | Larry Jayy; Bandz; DJ Vision^{[a]} | 2:43 |
| 3. | "Toxic" | K. Jackson; Mary J. Blige; Sean Combs; Curtis Mayfield; Gil Askey; Jean-Claude Olivier; Samuel Ahana; Michael Crook; Sanders; Arlene Delvalle | Swish; Mike Crook; Larry Jayy^{[a]}; Reece Beats^{[a]} | 3:33 |
| 4. | "Maniac" | K. Jackson; Chauncey Hollis, Jr.; Dustin Corbett | Hit-Boy; Corbett | 2:46 |
| 5. | "How to Rob a Rapper" (with Mozzy and D3szn) | K. Jackson; Timothy Patterson; Glenstine Rodney; Terrace Martin; Terry Watson; Mitchell Pennell; Ambiance Sound | Martin; Tee-Watt; MixMP; Ambiance Sound; DJ Vision^{[a]}; Reece Beats^{[a]} | 3:32 |
| 6. | "I Dance" (with Duki featuring Cuco) | K. Jackson; Mauro Lombardo; Omar Banos; Ahana; Crook | Swish; Mike Crook; Blake Straus^{[a]}; Tom Levesque^{[a]} | 4:05 |
| 7. | "Scared Money" (featuring J. Cole and Moneybagg Yo) | K. Jackson; Jermaine Cole; Demario White, Jr.; Jack Gibson | Gibbo | 3:24 |
| 8. | "Go Dumb" (featuring H.E.R.) | K. Jackson; Gabriella Wilson; Earl Stevens; Jonathan Smith; Darryl McDaniels; Russell Simmons; Joseph Simmons; Tiara Thomas; Maurice Ivory; Charles Williams; Henry Oyekanmi; Amirkhani; Kevin Ekofo; Tyler Hinkson-Ward | Bijan Amir; Kofo; Ty Leon; Reece Beats | 4:24 |
| 9. | "No Love" | K. Jackson; Lawrence Young, Jr.; Lonnie Simmons; Dan Walsh; Michael Price; Rudoph Taylor; Ivory | Snipe Young; Reece Beats | 3:26 |
| 10. | "Sober" (featuring Roddy Ricch and Post Malone) | K. Jackson; Rodrick Moore, Jr.; Austin Post; Benjamin Hubble; Gibson | Layz; Gibbo; Reece Beats^{[a]} | 4:13 |
| 11. | "Drink to This" | K. Jackson; Johnny Jackson; Tupac Shakur; Bruce Washington, Jr.; Yafeu Fula; Dennis Lambert; Duane Hitchings; Francine Golde; Michael Greenidge; Blake Straus; Joel Banks; Taylor Banks | Straus; Bankroll Got It | 3:38 |
| 12. | "No Weapon" (with Nas) | K. Jackson; Nasir Jones; O'Shea Jackson, Sr.; O'Kelly Isley Jr.; Rudolph Isley; Ronald Isley; Ernest Isley; Marvin Isley; Chris Jasper; Sylvia Robinson; Albert Goodman; Enoch Harris; Vincent Goodyer; Glenn Hopper; Harry RayAhana | 18YOMAN; Lil Rich; Len20; Swish; Levesque^{[a]} | 4:15 |
| 13. | "Alone" | K. Jackson; Ahana; Harris; Goodyer; Michael Denne | Swish; 18YOMAN; Lil Rich; Reece Beats^{[a]} | 2:38 |
| 14. | "Killa Cali" | K. Jackson; Ahana; Dylan Teixeira | Swish; Nami | 3:35 |
| Total length: | | | | 48:39 |

Notes

- ^{^[a]} signifies a co-producer

== Charts ==
Chart performance for I Got Issues
| Chart (2022) | Peak position |
|---|---|
| Australian Digital Albums (ARIA) | 43 |
| US Billboard 200 | 18 |
| US Top R&B/Hip-Hop Albums (Billboard) | 12 |
