= Me vs. Me =

Me vs Me may refer to:

- Me vs. Me, a 2016 EP by Ella Chen
- "Me vs. Me", by Busdriver off the 2018 album Electricity Is on Our Side
- "Me vs Me" (song), a 2020 single by Moneybagg Yo
- Me vs. Me (NLE Choppa mixtape), 2022
- Me vs Me (Yung Fazo mixtape), 2022
