= 43va Heartless =

Studio album by Moneybagg Yo
- Released: May 24, 2019
- Genre: Hip-hop
- Length: 40:21
- Label: CMG; BGE; N-Less; Interscope
- Producer: DMacTooBangin; P.Kaldone; Drumgod; Fuse; Javar Rockamore; June James; Nagra; Seph Got The Waves; Tay Keith; Yung Lan

Moneybagg Yo chronology
Reset (2018)	43va Heartless (2019)	Time Served (2020)

Professional ratings
Review scores
Source	Rating
Pitchfork	7.5/10

43va Heartless (stylized 43VA HEARTLESS) is the second studio album by American rapper Moneybagg Yo. It was released on May 24, 2019, through Collective Music Group, Bread Gang Entertainment, N-Less Entertainment, and Interscope Records. The album features collaborations with Gunna, City Girls, Offset, Lil Durk, Blac Youngsta, and Kevin Gates. The album debuted at number four on the US Billboard 200.

== Background ==
The album is the third and final installment in Moneybagg Yo's Heartless series, following Heartless (2017) and 2 Heartless (2018).

== Commercial performance ==
43va Heartless debuted at number four on the US Billboard 200, earning 40,000 album-equivalent units (including 5,000 pure album sales) in its first week. It became his highest-charting album at the time. The album also outsold other notable releases that week like YG's 4Real 4Real. One song on the album, "Dior" (featuring Gunna), is certified gold.

== Track listing ==
Credits adapted from Tidal.

43va Heartless
No.	Title	Writer(s)	Producer(s)	Length
1.	"Relentless Again"	Demario White, Jr.; Robert Gullatt	Drumgod	2:42
2.	"Drais"	White, Jr.; Dylan McKinney; Gullatt	DMacTooBangin; Drumgod	2:45
3.	"Dior" (featuring Gunna)	White, Jr.; Sergio Kitchens; McKinney	DMacTooBangin	2:53
4.	"Part of da Game"	White, Jr.; McKinney; Gullatt	DMacTooBangin; Drumgod	2:59
5.	"4 da Moment" (featuring City Girls)	White, Jr.; Caresha Brownlee; Jatavia Johnson; Gullatt	Drumgod	2:22
6.	"Toxic"	White, Jr.; Gullatt	Drumgod; P.Kaldone; Seph Got The Waves^{[b]}	2:33
7.	"Style Ain't Free" (featuring Offset)	White, Jr.; Kiari Kendrell Cephus; June James	June James	2:35
8.	"On My Soul" (featuring Lil Durk)	White, Jr.; Durk Banks; James	June James	2:55
9.	"No Filter"	White, Jr.; Brytavious Chambers	Tay Keith	2:50
10.	"Commotion"	White, Jr.; Eduardo Earle	Fuse; Nagra^{[b]}	3:12
11.	"Blac Money" (featuring Blac Youngsta)	White, Jr.; Samuel Benson; McKinney; Gullatt	DMacTooBangin; Drumgod	3:24
12.	"Wat3va I'm Wit"	White, Jr.; McKinney; Gullatt	DMacTooBangin; Drumgod	3:15
13.	"Headstrong" (featuring Kevin Gates)	White, Jr.; Kevin Gilyard; Milan Modi	Yung Lan	2:31
14.	"Word 4 Word"	White, Jr.; Gullatt; Rockamore	Drumgod; Rockamore^{[a]}	3:25
Total length:				40:21

Notes

- ^{^[a]} signifies an additional producer
- ^{^[b]} signifies an uncredited co-producer

== Personnel ==
Credits adapted from Tidal.

Performers

- Moneybagg Yo – primary artist
- Gunna – featured artist (track 3)
- City Girls – featured artist (track 5)
- Offset – featured artist (track 7)
- Lil Durk – featured artist (track 8)
- Blac Youngsta – featured artist (track 11)
- Kevin Gates – featured artist (track 13)

Technical

- Skywalker OG – recording engineering (all tracks), mixing engineering (all tracks)
- Leo Goff – mixing (all tracks)
- Tony Wilson – mastering (all tracks)

Production

- Drumgod – producer (tracks 1, 2, 4–6, 11, 12, 14)
- DMacTooBangin – producer (tracks 2–5, 11, 12)
- Seph Got the Waves – producer (track 6)
- P.Kaldone – producer (track 6)
- June James – producer (tracks 7, 8)
- Tay Keith – producer (track 9)
- Fuse – producer (track 10)
- Nagra – producer (track 10)
- Yung Lan – producer (track 13)
- Javar Rockamore – producer (track 14)

== Charts ==
=== Weekly charts ===
Chart (2019)	Peak position
US Billboard 200	4
US Top R&B/Hip-Hop Albums (Billboard)	3

=== Year-end charts ===
Chart (2019)	Position
US Top R&B/Hip-Hop Albums (Billboard)	86

== Certifications ==
Certifications for 43va Heartless
Region	Certification	Certified units/sales
United States (RIAA)	Gold	500,000^{‡}
^{‡} Sales+streaming figures based on certification alone.
