= Fed Baby's =

2017 mixtape by MoneyBagg Yo and YoungBoy Never Broke Again

Mixtape by Moneybagg Yo and YoungBoy Never Broke Again
- Released: November 16, 2017
- Recorded: 2017
- Genre: Hip hop
- Length: 43:07
- Label: Never Broke Again; Bread Gang Entertainment; Collective Music Group; Atlantic Records; Interscope Records; N-Less Entertainment

Moneybagg Yo chronology
Federal 3X (2017)	Fed Baby's (2017)	2 Heartless (2018)

YoungBoy Never Broke Again chronology
Ain’t Too Long (2017)	Fed Baby's (2017)	Until Death Call My Name (2018)

Fed Baby's is a collaborative mixtape between rappers Moneybagg Yo and YoungBoy Never Broke Again. It was released on November 16, 2017, through Never Broke Again, Bread Gang Entertainment, Collective Music Group, Atlantic Records, Interscope Records and N-Less Entertainment. The mixtape includes two features from Young Thug and Quavo.

The day after the mixtape was released, YoungBoy dissed Moneybagg Yo in a video posted to Instagram, saying: "Fuck that tape! And I want smoke, bitch I ain't playin'".

The mixtape later debuted at number 21 on the US Billboard 200.

== Track listing ==
No.	Title	Producers	Length
1.	"Change Partners"	Poohbeatz; Go Grizzly	3:14
2.	"Preliminary Hearing"	Mike Laury; Dubba-AA	3:01
3.	"Mandatory Drug Test" (Moneybagg Yo featuring Young Thug)	Javar Rockamore; Stonii	3:33
4.	"Collateral Damage"	DJ Swift	2:57
5.	"Character Witness"	Southside	2:28
6.	"Plea Deal"	DJ Swift; Dubba-AA	3:12
7.	"Contempt Of Court"	DJ Chose	2:35
8.	"Judgement" (MoneyBagg Yo)	DJ Swift; Dubba-AA	3:35
9.	"Pleading The Fifth" (featuring Quavo)	Da Honorable C.N.O.T.E.; Bobby Kritical	3:14
10.	"Tampering With Evidence" (YoungBoy Never Broke Again)	Dubba-AA; DJ Swift	2:15
11.	"Acquittal"	June James	3:11
12.	"Appeal" (MoneyBagg Yo)	DJ Swift; Dubba-AA	3:25
13.	"Homicide"	DMacTooBangin	2:53
14.	"Prime Suspect"	June James	3:34
Total length:			43:07

== Charts ==
Chart (2017)	Peak position
US Billboard 200	21
US Top R&B/Hip-Hop Albums (Billboard)	9
US Top Rap Albums (Billboard)	7

== Certifications ==
Certifications for Fed Baby's
Region	Certification	Certified units/sales
United States (RIAA)	Gold	500,000^{‡}
^{‡} Sales+streaming figures based on certification alone.
