= On Wat U On =

2023 single by Moneybagg Yo and GloRilla

Single by Moneybagg Yo and GloRilla

from the album Hard to Love
- Released: January 12, 2023
- Genre: Trap
- Length: 2:39
- Label: Collective; N-Less; Interscope
- Songwriters: Demario White, Jr.; Gloria Woods; Christopher Pearson; Thomas Walker; Robert Gullatt
- Producers: YC; Skywalker OG; DrumGod

Moneybagg Yo singles chronology
| "Quickie" (2022) | "On Wat U On" (2023) | "Shot Off Gumbo" (2023) |

GloRilla singles chronology
| "FTCU" (2022) | "On Wat U On" (2022) | "Bestfrenn" (2023) |

Music video
- "On Wat U On" on YouTube

"On Wat U On" is a song by American rappers Moneybagg Yo and GloRilla, released on January 12, 2023 with an accompanying music video. It is the second single from the former's mixtape Hard to Love (2023). The song was produced by YC, Skywalker OG and DrumGod.

== Composition ==
The song features a bass-heavy trap beat with a piano arrangement, while lyrically it deals with the theme of a couple quarreling. The rappers express their resentment toward their partners; while Moneybagg Yo raps about trying to hide his infidelity and needing time to be away from a partner, GloRilla accuses her partner of cheating on her. The song has been compared to "We Cry Together" by Kendrick Lamar and Taylour Paige, with Aron A. of HotNewHipHop pointing out the conversational performance in the choruses of both songs.

== Music video ==
The official music video has been noted for recreating scenes from the 2001 film Baby Boy; Moneybagg Yo and GloRilla play the roles of characters Jody and Yvette respectively. The clip begins with them entering a fast food drive-through, as GloRilla finds empty condom wrappers in the backseat of Moneybagg's car and severely criticizes him. The two continue their argument inside and outside their apartment complex, escalating to the point where GloRilla throws a boulder into Moneybagg Yo's Toyota Camry windshield.

== Charts ==
Chart performance for "On Wat U On"
| Chart (2023) | Peak position |
|---|---|
| US Billboard Hot 100 | 56 |
| US Hot R&B/Hip-Hop Songs (Billboard) | 21 |

== Certifications ==
| Region | Certification | Certified units/sales |
|---|---|---|
| United States (RIAA) | Platinum | 1,000,000^{‡} |
^{‡} Sales+streaming figures based on certification alone.
