= Blow (Moneybagg Yo song) =

2022 single by Moneybagg Yo

Single by Moneybagg Yo
- Released: September 22, 2022
- Recorded: August 2022
- Length: 3:02
- Label: Collective; Interscope; N-Less
- Songwriters: Demario White, Jr.; Robert Gullatt; Moritz Busch; Max Wonnenberg
- Producers: DrumGod; ShortyyK; Rizzo8

Moneybagg Yo singles chronology
"Too Much" (2022)	"Blow" (2022)	"Tick (Remix)" (2022)

Music video
- "Blow" on YouTube

"Blow" is a song by American rapper Moneybagg Yo, released on September 22, 2022. It was produced by DrumGod, ShortyyK and Rizzo8.

== Background ==
Moneybagg Yo released the song on his 31st birthday. Previously, he teased the song on Apple Music 1 and told Zane Lowe how it was made: "The vibe... it was just a party, birthday club vibe. I made it probably a month ago but then I was making it intentionally for my birthday, you know what I'm saying? Just trying to put out a birthday song, do a record."

== Content ==
The song finds Moneybagg Yo boasting about his wealth and detailing his lifestyle, specifically his ability to "blow" money on luxury items (including clothes, diamonds and cars) and women. He first outlines his plan for his birthday, before listing off his purchases.

== Charts ==
Chart performance for "Blow"
Chart (2022)	Peak position
US Billboard Hot 100	96
US Hot R&B/Hip-Hop Songs (Billboard)	27
