= Whiskey Whiskey =

2024 single by Moneybagg Yo featuring Morgan Wallen

Single by Moneybagg Yo featuring Morgan Wallen

from the album Speak Now
- Released: August 13, 2024
- Genre: Trap
- Length: 2:41
- Label: Roc Nation; CMG; N-Less; Interscope
- Songwriters: DeMario White, Jr.; Morgan Wallen; Chandler Great; Ryan Vojtesak; Amman Nurani; Ashley Gorley; Jaucquez Lowe; David Ruoff; Elias Klughammer
- Producers: Turbo; Charlie Handsome; Evrgrn

Moneybagg Yo singles chronology
"Homebody" (Remix) (2024)	"Whiskey Whiskey" (2024)	"Type a Nigga" (2024)

Morgan Wallen singles chronology
"I Had Some Help" (2024)	"Whiskey Whiskey" (2024)	"Lies Lies Lies" (2024)

Audio video
- "Whiskey Whiskey" on YouTube

"Whiskey Whiskey" is a song by American rapper Moneybagg Yo, featuring vocals from American country music singer Morgan Wallen. It was released through Roc Nation, Collective Music Group, Bread Gang Entertainment, N-Less Entertainment, and Interscope Records as the fourth and final single from the former's fifth studio album, Speak Now, on August 13, 2024. The two artists wrote the song with producers Turbo, Charlie Handsome, and Evrgrn, alongside Ashley Gorley, London Jae, and David x Eli production duo members David Ruoff and Elias Klughammer.

== Background and composition ==
In an interview with Billboard, Moneybagg Yo said that he and Morgan Wallen made the song a year-and-a-half to two years before it was released. "Whiskey Whiskey" is a trap song. Lyrically, the song is about the two artists' struggles with alcohol and their previous relationships.

== Charts ==
=== Weekly charts ===
Weekly chart performance for "Whiskey Whiskey"
Chart (2024)	Peak position
Canada Hot 100 (Billboard)	49
Global 200 (Billboard)	58
New Zealand Hot Singles (RMNZ)	33
US Billboard Hot 100	21
US Hot Country Songs (Billboard)	6
US Rhythmic Airplay (Billboard)	10

=== Year-end charts ===
2024 year-end chart performance for "Whiskey Whiskey"
Chart (2024)	Position
US Hot Country Songs (Billboard)	34

== Certifications ==
Region	Certification	Certified units/sales
United States (RIAA)	2× Platinum	2,000,000^{‡}
^{‡} Sales+streaming figures based on certification alone.
