= Keep It Low =

2023 song by Moneybagg Yo featuring Future

Promotional single by Moneybagg Yo featuring Future

from the album Hard to Love
- Released: June 2, 2023
- Length: 2:22
- Label: Collective; Interscope; N-Less
- Songwriters: Demario White Jr.; Nayvadius Cash; Taureon Hailey; Thomas Walker; Robert Gullatt; Young Culture Beats
- Producers: T-Head; Skywalker OG; DrumGod; Young Culture Beats

"Keep It Low" is a song by American rapper Moneybagg Yo, released from his mixtape Hard to Love (2023) as a promotional single. It features American rapper Future. The song was produced by T-Head, Skywalker OG, DrumGod and Young Culture Beats.

== Critical reception ==
Mark Braboy of Rolling Stone regarded "Keep It Low" as one of the songs from Hard to Love in which Moneybagg Yo "foregrounds his sultry machismo". Nina Hernandez of HipHopDX commented it "drips toxicity and feels destined to be bumped in clubs."

== Charts ==
Chart performance for "Keep It Low"
| Chart (2023) | Peak position |
|---|---|
| New Zealand Hot Singles (RMNZ) | 38 |
| US Billboard Hot 100 | 59 |
| US Hot R&B/Hip-Hop Songs (Billboard) | 19 |

== Certifications ==
| Region | Certification | Certified units/sales |
|---|---|---|
| United States (RIAA) | Gold | 500,000^{‡} |
^{‡} Sales+streaming figures based on certification alone.
