= 1 2 3 (Moneybagg Yo song) =

2020 single by Moneybagg Yo featuring Blac Youngsta

Single by Moneybagg Yo featuring Blac Youngsta

from the album Time Served
- Released: April 14, 2020
- Genre: Hip hop; trap
- Length: 2:36
- Label: Interscope; N-Less
- Songwriters: Demario White, Jr.; Sammie Benson; Xabian Woods
- Producer: DJ X.O.

Moneybagg Yo singles chronology
"U Played" (2020)	"1 2 3" (2020)	"Blue Jean Bandit" (2020)

Blac Youngsta singles chronology
"Like a Pro" (2019)	"1 2 3" (2020)	"I Met Tay Keith First" (2020)

Music video
- "1 2 3" on YouTube

"1 2 3" is a song by American rapper Moneybagg Yo featuring American rapper Blac Youngsta, from the former's third studio album Time Served (2020). It was sent to rhythmic contemporary radio on April 14, 2020, as the third single of the album. The music video was released on the same day.

== Chart performance ==
123 missed the US Billboard Hot 100 chart, peaking at number one on the US Bubbling Under Hot 100 chart. On August 18, 2020, the album was certified gold by the Recording Industry Association of America (RIAA) for combined sales and streaming data of over 500,000 units in the United States.

== Charts ==
Chart (2020)	Peak position
US Bubbling Under Hot 100 (Billboard)	1
US Hot R&B/Hip-Hop Songs (Billboard)	43
US Rhythmic Airplay (Billboard)	36

== Certifications ==
Region	Certification	Certified units/sales
United States (RIAA)	Platinum	1,000,000^{‡}
^{‡} Sales+streaming figures based on certification alone.
