= Motion God =

2023 single by Moneybagg Yo

Single by Moneybagg Yo

from the album Hard to Love
- Released: April 21, 2023
- Length: 2:23
- Label: Collective; N-Less; Interscope
- Songwriters: Demario White, Jr.; Taureon Hailey; Thomas Walker
- Producers: T-Head; Skywalker OG

Moneybagg Yo singles chronology
"Blocks" (2023)	"Motion God" (2023)	"Ocean Spray" (2023)

Music video
- "Motion God" on YouTube

"Motion God" is a song by American rapper Moneybagg Yo, released on April 21, 2023 by Collective Music Group, N-Less Entertainment and Interscope Records. It is the fourth single from his mixtape Hard to Love (2023). The song was produced by T-Head and Skywalker OG.

== Composition ==
The song takes an "energetic yet somewhat laid-back approach", featuring a trap beat paired with melodic bells in the background with regard to production. In the lyrics, Moneybagg Yo boasts his success and wealth.

== Critical reception ==
Alexander Cole of HotNewHipHop praised the song, commenting "As for MoneyBagg Yo, his flow sounds as focused as ever. Additionally, his lyricism is focused and clever, which makes the song that much better. Overall, it is yet another amazing effort from the artist." Jordan Rose of Complex described the rapper as "finding his groove over creative production choices", additionally writing, "Moneybagg isn't concerned about much these days, and 'Motion God' sounds like the perfect prelude to his laid-back summer."

== Music video ==
The music video was directed by BenMarc and released alongside the single. It finds Moneybagg Yo and his crew outside of a Miami mansion, at a "Last Supper-esque" feast, flashing stacks of cash and big chains while dressed as Cash Money Records rappers from the 1990s to 2000s, in white tees and bandanas. Moneybagg also shows off his cars and a motorcycle (accompanied by bikini-clad women) and raps in front of a helicopter while wearing a Vancouver Grizzlies jersey.

== Charts ==
Chart performance for "Motion God"
Chart (2023)	Peak position
US Bubbling Under Hot 100 (Billboard)	12
US Hot R&B/Hip-Hop Songs (Billboard)	38

== Certifications ==
Region	Certification	Certified units/sales
United States (RIAA)	Gold	500,000^{‡}
^{‡} Sales+streaming figures based on certification alone.
