= Ocean Spray (Moneybagg Yo song) =

2023 single by Moneybagg Yo

Single by Moneybagg Yo

from the album Hard to Love
- Released: May 24, 2023
- Length: 2:44
- Label: Collective; Interscope; N-Less
- Songwriters: Demario White Jr.; Dyllan McKinney
- Producer: DMacTooBangin

Moneybagg Yo singles chronology
"Motion God" (2023)	"Ocean Spray" (2023)

Music video
- "Ocean Spray" on YouTube

"Ocean Spray" is a song by American rapper Moneybagg Yo, released on May 24, 2023, as the fifth single from his mixtape Hard to Love (2023). Originally released in 2018 produced by DMacTooBangin, it contains a sample of "Smokin' and Sippin'" by Juicy J and Lex Luger.

== Composition and lyrics ==
In the song, Moneybagg Yo melodically raps about his luxury, fame, and notably his love for drinking lean; he rap-sings in the chorus: "I'm juiced up / Ocean Spray / I'm poured up / Let's drink some more today / I'm high now, might float away if I was outside now / I'm vibed out, new Cartiers hide my eyes now".

== Music video ==
The music video was directed by Ben Marc and released alongside the single. It features a purple filter. The clip sees Moneybagg Yo driving around Miami in a bright purple Mercedes-Benz, in a room full of money and in front of a massive aquarium. He is frequently seen with a styrofoam cup in his hand.

== Charts ==
Chart performance for "Ocean Spray"
Chart (2023)	Peak position
New Zealand Hot Singles (RMNZ)	32
US Billboard Hot 100	69
US Hot R&B/Hip-Hop Songs (Billboard)	26

== Certifications ==
Region	Certification	Certified units/sales
United States (RIAA)	Platinum	1,000,000^{‡}
^{‡} Sales+streaming figures based on certification alone.
