= Quickie (Moneybagg Yo song) =

2022 single by Moneybagg Yo

Single by Moneybagg Yo

from the album Hard to Love
- Released: December 8, 2022
- Genre: Dirty rap
- Length: 3:07
- Label: Collective; Interscope; N-Less
- Songwriters: Demario White, Jr.; Thomas Walker
- Producer: Skywalker OG

Moneybagg Yo singles chronology
"Tick (Remix)" (2022)	"Quickie" (2022)	"On Wat U On" (2023)

Music video
- "Quickie" on YouTube

"Quickie" is a song by American rapper Moneybagg Yo, released on December 8, 2022, as the lead single from his mixtape Hard to Love (2023). It was produced by Skywalker OG.

== Composition ==
The song is built on a sample of "Prelude" by Lamont Dozier. Lyrically, Moneybagg Yo reflects on a series of his encounters with women that become sexual relationships.

== Critical reception ==
Aron A. of HotNewHipHop gave the song a "Very Hottttt" rating, writing, "Bagg's wordplay and lax delivery captures sexual tension between lovers that's similarly erotic and melancholic. 'Quickie' is an anthem that fans of Bagg have been waiting for. It shows his ability to modernize iconic samples from the past and transform them into his own, similar to 'Wockesha.'"

== Music video ==
The music video was released alongside the single. Directed by Diesel Filmz, it finds Moneybagg Yo in a strip club, wearing neon, making it rain as women dance around him. He is also seen wearing an astronaut suit against interstellar backdrop, and having an intimate encounter with a woman in the back of a Rolls-Royce.

== Charts ==
Chart performance for "Quickie"
Chart (2022)	Peak position
US Bubbling Under Hot 100 (Billboard)	1
US Hot R&B/Hip-Hop Songs (Billboard)	49

== Certifications ==
Region	Certification	Certified units/sales
New Zealand (RMNZ)	Gold	15,000^{‡}
United States (RIAA)	Platinum	1,000,000^{‡}
^{‡} Sales+streaming figures based on certification alone.

== Release history ==
Release dates and formats for "Quickie"
Region	Date	Format(s)	Label	Ref.
Various	December 8, 2022	Digital download; streaming	Collective; Interscope; N-Less	
United States	January 24, 2023	Rhythmic contemporary radio	Collective; Interscope; N-Less	
