= Speak Now (Moneybagg Yo album) =

- Standard cover; deluxe edition features a black background with purple flames

Studio album by Moneybagg Yo
- Released: June 14, 2024
- Length: 51:20
- Label: CMG; N-Less; Interscope
- Producer: 254bodi; AyoWuan; Boi-1da; BWolf201; Charlie Handsome; DB!; Dez Wright; DJ Bandz; DJ Swift; Drumgod; EJPXris; Evrgrn; Gentle Beatz; Hardocc; Haze; Hoops; Huncho Made This; Ike; Juke Wong; Kash Flow; KlutchFrenchie; LMC; Meech Magic; Mike Hector; Phantom; Skywalker OG; Smiley; Tay Keith; Turbo; T-Head; Wheezy; Yung Dee

Moneybagg Yo chronology
Hard to Love (2023)	Speak Now (2024)

Singles from Speak Now
- 1. "Bussin" Released: March 29, 2024; 2. "Tryna Make Sure" Released: May 3, 2024; 3. "Play da Fool" Released: June 7, 2024; 4. "Whiskey Whiskey" Released: August 13, 2024

Professional ratings
Review scores
Source	Rating
AllMusic	3.5/5 stars
RapReviews	7/10

Speak Now is the fifth studio album by American rapper Moneybagg Yo, released through Collective Music Group, N-Less Entertainment, and Interscope Records on June 14, 2024. It features guest appearances from Chris Brown, Rob49, Lil Durk, YTB Fatt, Morgan Wallen, and Kevo Muney; the deluxe edition additionally features GloRilla, Big Boogie, and BossMan Dlow. Production was handled by Tay Keith, Boi-1da, Wheezy, Turbo, and Charlie Handsome, among others.

== Release and promotion ==
On March 29, 2024, Moneybagg Yo released the lead single of the album, "Bussin", a collaboration with fellow American rapper Rob49. "Tryna Make Sure" was released as its second single on May 3, 2024. Later that month, Moneybagg Yo announced the title of the album and its release date before announcing that he would have to push its release date back by three weeks due to him waiting on a popular artist sending him guest vocals on May 23, 2024, the day before its scheduled release. "Play da Fool" was released as the third single of the album on June 7, 2024. He revealed the tracklist of the album four days later. The fourth and final single of the album, "Whiskey Whiskey", which features American country music singer Morgan Wallen, was sent to US rhythmic radio on August 13, 2024.

The deluxe edition of the album, titled Speak Now Or..., was released on September 27, 2024.

== Track listing ==
Speak Now track listing
No.	Title	Writer(s)	Producer(s)	Length
1.	"All Year"	Demario White, Jr.; Robert Gullatt; Jawuan Jackson; Jorgen Sweeney	Drumgod; Ayowuan; Hardocc	2:42
2.	"Speak"	White; Gullatt; Amman Nurani; Liam McAlister; Thomas Walker; Darius Henry; Patrick Bodi; Kashies McKinley	Drumgod; Evrgrn; LMC; Skywalker OG; Yung Dee; 254bodi; Kash Flow	2:19
3.	"P Run"	White; Gullatt; Daniel Schnabel	Drumgod; Gentle Beatz	3:00
4.	"Tryna Make Sure"	White; Brytavious Chambers	Tay Keith	2:46
5.	"Taboo Miami"	White; Matthew Samuels; Mike Hector; Gullatt; Douglas Ford	Boi-1da; Hector; Drumgod	2:48
6.	"Fireplace"	White; Brian Wolf	BWolf201	2:10
7.	"I Feel It"	White; Gullatt; Darryon Bunton	Drumgod; DB!	1:51
8.	"Drunk Off U" (with Chris Brown)	White; Christopher Brown; Kisean Anderson; Henry Velasco; Ethan Hayes; Gullatt	Hoops; Haze; Drumgod	3:16
9.	"Bussin" (with Rob49)	White; Robert Thomas; Wesley Glass; Chambers; Deavon Petty; Kobe Hood	Wheezy; Tay Keith	2:44
10.	"Tic Tac Toe"	White; Gullatt; Damion Williams; Taureon Hailey	Drumgod; DJ Swift; T-Head	2:35
11.	"Gangstas Relate" (with Lil Durk)	White; Durk Banks; Devonte Richmond; Demetrises Bell; Isaac Allwine	DJ Bandz; Meech Magic; Ike	2:39
12.	"Play da Fool"	White; Wolf	BWolf201	2:19
13.	"Rich Viking"	White; Glass; Dylan Cleary-Krell; Lucas DePante; Edin Jakupovic	Wheezy; Dez Wright; Juke Wong; EJPXris	2:36
14.	"On Det" (with YTB Fatt)	White; Cavon Paige; Wankang Lu; Zhiquan Jiang; Matthew Taylor	KlutchFrenchie; Phantom; Smiley	2:33
15.	"Whiskey Whiskey" (featuring Morgan Wallen)	White; Morgan Wallen; Chandler Great; Ryan Vojtesak; Nurani; Ashley Gorley; Jaucquez Lowe; David Ruoff; Elias Klughammer	Turbo; Charlie Handsome; Evrgrn	2:41
16.	"Aw Shit"	White; Gullatt; Walker	Drumgod; Skywalker OG	2:47
17.	"Go Gho$t" (interlude) (with Kevo Muney)	White; Kevo Meeks; Kyler Gregory	Huncho Made This	2:46
Total length:				44:38

Speak Now Or... deluxe additional track listing
No.	Title	Writer(s)	Producer(s)	Length
1.	"Sum to Hate On"	White; Ivan Tagle; Taylor; Paul Penso; Steven Castillo	KlutchFrenchie; Kast Beats; Koncept P; Benmari	2:38
2.	"Rap Niggas"	White; Caleb Hosch; Connor Barkhouse; Joshua Ayers	Barkhouse; Benny Henny; Kxylib	1:56
3.	"Do Yo Shit"	White; Krishon Gaines; Marcus Jones	Bandplay	2:43
4.	"Outta Town" (featuring BossMan Dlow)	White; Armando Griffin; Aubrey Greene; Damien Aubrey; Devante McCreary; Kevin Price	Go Grizzly; Dun Deal; Poseidon	2:13
5.	"On God"	White; Lucas Difabbio; Gullatt	Drumgod; DunkRock	3:00
6.	"Foot Soldiers"	White; Jackie Plant; Jones; Raheem Hightower; Tyreek Myles	Hardbody B-Eazy; Hardbody Heero; T-Money; Shot Off	3:25
7.	"WYD" (with GloRilla and Big Boogie)	White; Hayes; Gloria Woods; Jacob Matthews; Jaucquez Lowe; John Lotts; Ryan Hartlove	London Jae; Haze; Harto; 10k Jake	3:33
Total length:				64:06

== Charts ==
=== Weekly charts ===
Weekly chart performance for Speak Now
Chart (2024)	Peak position
Canadian Albums (Billboard)	62
US Billboard 200	13
US Top R&B/Hip-Hop Albums (Billboard)	3

=== Year-end charts ===
Year-end chart performance for Speak Now
Chart (2024)	Position
US Billboard 200	198
US Top R&B/Hip-Hop Albums (Billboard)	56

== Certifications ==
Certifications for Speak Now
Region	Certification	Certified units/sales
United States (RIAA)	Gold	500,000^{‡}
^{‡} Sales+streaming figures based on certification alone.
