= Bussin (Moneybagg Yo and Rob49 song) =

2024 single by Moneybagg Yo and Rob49

Single by Moneybagg Yo and Rob49

from the album Speak Now
- Released: March 29, 2024
- Genre: Hip-hop; trap; Dirty rap
- Length: 2:44
- Label: Collective; N-Less; Interscope
- Songwriters: DeMario White Jr.; Robert Thomas; Wesley Glass; Brytavious Chambers; Deavon Petty; Kobe Hood
- Producers: Wheezy; Tay Keith

Moneybagg Yo singles chronology
"Trapper of the Year" (2024)	"Bussin" (2024)	"Tryna Make Sure" (2024)

Rob49 singles chronology
"Back from That" (2024)	"Bussin" (2024)	"Freaknik" (2024)

Music video
- "Bussin" on YouTube

"Bussin" is a song by American rappers Moneybagg Yo and Rob49. Produced by Wheezy and Tay Keith, it was released as the lead single from the former's fifth studio album, Speak Now, on March 29, 2024.

== Composition and critical reception ==
"Bussin" is a trap song that finds Moneybagg Yo and Rob49 rapping about women and sex. Zachary Horvath of HotNewHipHop described the song as "ready for the strip clubs and nightclubs with its loud and aggressive tone."

== Music video ==
The music video was released alongside the single. It features a cameo from actress Ari "the Don" Fletcher.

== Charts ==
Chart performance for "Bussin"
Chart (2024)	Peak position
US Bubbling Under Hot 100 (Billboard)	3
US Hot R&B/Hip-Hop Songs (Billboard)	44

== Certifications ==
Region	Certification	Certified units/sales
United States (RIAA)	Gold	500,000^{‡}
^{‡} Sales+streaming figures based on certification alone.
