= Toxic (YG song) =

2022 single by YG

Single by YG

from the album I Got Issues
- Released: August 12, 2022
- Length: 3:33
- Label: 4Hunnid; Def Jam
- Songwriters: Keenon Jackson; Mary J. Blige; Sean Combs; Jean-Claude Olivier; Curtis Mayfield; Arlene DelValle; Larry Sanders; Gil Askey; Samuel Ahana
- Producers: DJ Swish; Mike Crook; Reece Beats; Larry Jayy

YG singles chronology
"Run" (2022)	"Toxic" (2022)	"Sport Mode" (2022)

Music video
- "Toxic" on YouTube

"Toxic" is a song by American rapper YG, released on August 12, 2022 as the third single from his sixth studio album I Got Issues (2022). It contains a sample of "Be Happy" by American singer Mary J. Blige. The song was produced by DJ Swish, Mike Crook, Reece Beats and Larry Jayy.

== Background ==
YG first teased the song on social media in April 2022. On August 11, 2022, YG shared a variation of the cover artwork for the song, which shows him kneeling and kissing the pregnant stomach of social media influencer Brittany Renner.

== Content ==
In the song, YG raps about the "ups and downs" of relationships.

== Music video ==
The music video, released along with the single, was directed by YG and Austin Simkins. It depicts YG in a relationship with Brittany Renner, while also having a relationship with another woman whom he spends a lot of time with. YG is madly in love with the latter woman, but does not share her desire to be fully invested in their relationship. He begins to have second thoughts. The woman secretly looks through his phone and finds a picture of him kissing the belly of a pregnant Renner.

== Charts ==
=== Weekly charts ===
Weekly chart performance for "Toxic"
Chart (2022)	Peak position
New Zealand (Recorded Music NZ)	37
US Billboard Hot 100	81
US Hot R&B/Hip-Hop Songs (Billboard)	23
US Rhythmic Airplay (Billboard)	1

=== Year-end charts ===
Year-end chart performance for "Toxic"
Chart (2023)	Position
US Rhythmic (Billboard)	42

== Certifications ==
Region	Certification	Certified units/sales
New Zealand (RMNZ)	Platinum	30,000^{‡}
^{‡} Sales+streaming figures based on certification alone.
