= Toes (DaBaby song) =

2019 song by DaBaby featuring Lil Baby and Moneybagg Yo

Song by DaBaby featuring Lil Baby and Moneybagg Yo

from the album Kirk
- Released: September 27, 2019
- Genre: Trap
- Length: 2:16
- Label: South Coast; Interscope
- Songwriters: Jonathan Kirk; Dominique Jones; Demario White, Jr.; Kenneth Blume III; Joseph Karnes; Jeremy Ruzumna; Jared Scharff
- Producers: Kenny Beats; Queen Sixties

"Toes" (stylized in all caps) is a song by American rapper DaBaby, released on September 27, 2019, from his second studio album Kirk. It features American rappers Lil Baby and Moneybagg Yo. The song was produced by Kenny Beats and Queen Sixties.

== Composition ==
The production of the song contains a whistling loop, alongside bass and percussions. DaBaby, Lil Baby and Moneybagg Yo perform the first, second and third verses respectively. David Crone of AllMusic described the song as Wild West-inspired trap.

== Critical reception ==
In a review of Kirk, Crone stated "Of course, a DaBaby release comes with a certain set of lyrical staples: charismatic boasts come with reassuring regularity, and there are enough 'jit's and 'ain't no cap in my rap's to bring the record back home. Given the right production, Baby's charisma can carry them forward, with 'Toes' and 'There He Go' landing firmly in the upper ranks of his catalog." Will Schube of Complex wrote, "'Toes' works, mostly because of the whistle-led Kenny Beats production and the surprising chemistry between Moneybagg Yo and Lil Baby."

== Charts ==
Chart (2019–20)	Peak position
Canada Hot 100 (Billboard)	40
Ireland (IRMA)	63
New Zealand Hot Singles (RMNZ)	17
US Billboard Hot 100	28
US Hot R&B/Hip-Hop Songs (Billboard)	16

== Certifications ==
Region	Certification	Certified units/sales
Brazil (Pro-Música Brasil)	Gold	20,000^{‡}
New Zealand (RMNZ)	Gold	15,000^{‡}
United States (RIAA)	2× Platinum	2,000,000^{‡}
^{‡} Sales+streaming figures based on certification alone.
