= Scared Money =

2022 single by YG featuring J. Cole and Moneybagg Yo

Single by YG featuring J. Cole and Moneybagg Yo

from the album I Got Issues
- Released: February 4, 2022
- Genre: West Coast hip-hop; trap
- Length: 3:24
- Label: Def Jam; 4Hunnid
- Songwriters: Keenon Jackson; Jermaine Cole; Demario White, Jr.; Jack Gibson
- Producer: Gibson

YG singles chronology
"Miss California" (2021)	"Scared Money" (2022)	"Run" (2022)

J. Cole singles chronology
"Johnny P's Caddy" (2022)	"Scared Money" (2022)	"London" (2022)

Moneybagg Yo singles chronology
"Too Hot" (2022)	"Scared Money" (2022)	"G Lock" (2022)

Music video
- "Scared Money" on YouTube

"Scared Money" is a song by American rapper YG, featuring fellow American rappers J. Cole and Moneybagg Yo. It was released through Def Jam Recordings and 4Hunnid Records as the lead single from YG's sixth studio album, I Got Issues, on February 4, 2022. The three artists wrote the song with producer Gibbo. The song was originally supposed to be released earlier, according to it being listed to impact urban contemporary radio on January 25, 2022. YG announced its release date and shared its cover art on February 2, 2022.

== Composition and lyrics ==
Over the "menacing" piano-heavy instrumental of "Scared Money", YG, J. Cole, and Moneybagg Yo refer to the "scared money don't make no money" proverb. YG starts the song off with the first verse, in which he states compares his shoes to American rapper Kanye West's shoes and also declares himself as the "best dressed, but I ain't no Kid Cudi". Cole appears for the second verse, in which he refers to his "budding basketball career" and references the milk crate challenge ("I was thinkin' 'bout walkin' up a stack of crates/But I was busy stackin' cake"); he also compares himself to Canadian rapper and singer Drake and mentions the fact that he has three houses in the same neighborhood. Moneybagg Yo takes the third and final verse, in which he also boasts about his expensive purchases.

== Critical reception ==
Jordan Darville of The Fader described the beat as "a close sibling" of American rapper Kendrick Lamar's 2017 single, "Humble", "from the beat's stalking piano keys to YG's more playful-than-usual flows", but "the key difference is that this one has features: J. Cole and Moneybagg Yo show up to do their things and help try and make the song feel like an event". Writing for Stereogum, Tom Breihan felt that "sometimes, big-name rap collaborations feel like brand extensions that were brought up in boardrooms" and "this one feels like three rap stars out to flex on everyone else", acknowledging that "I know this isn't the best verse of J. Cole's career, but it might be the one that I've enjoyed the most".

== Charts ==
=== Weekly charts ===
Weekly chart performance for "Scared Money"
Chart (2022)	Peak position
Canada Hot 100 (Billboard)	75
Global 200 (Billboard)	176
New Zealand Hot Singles (RMNZ)	8
US Billboard Hot 100	73
US Hot R&B/Hip-Hop Songs (Billboard)	25
US Rhythmic Airplay (Billboard)	5

=== Year-end charts ===
2022 year-end chart performance for "Scared Money"
Chart (2022)	Position
US Hot R&B/Hip-Hop Songs (Billboard)	96
US Rhythmic (Billboard)	33

== Certifications ==
Certifications for "Scared Money"
Region	Certification	Certified units/sales
United States (RIAA)	Gold	500,000^{‡}
^{‡} Sales+streaming figures based on certification alone.
