= YTB Fatt =

American rapper (born 2001)

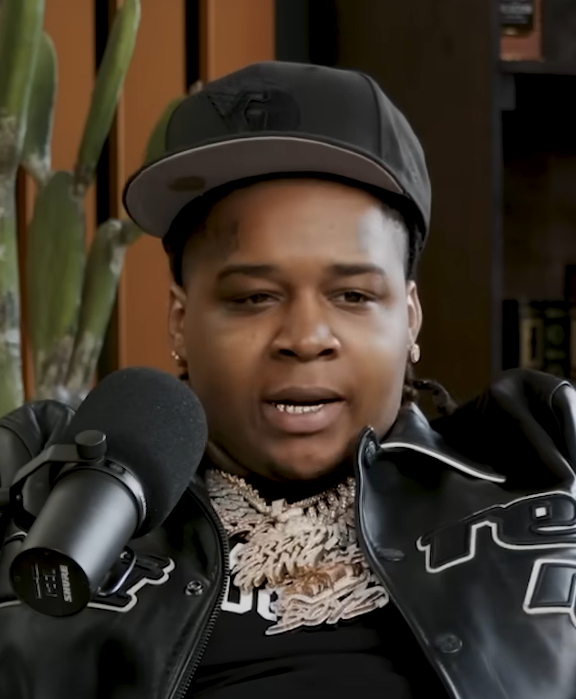
- YTB Fatt in 2024

Background information
- Born: Cavon Deshawn Paige; May 28, 2001 (age 25); West Memphis, Arkansas, U.S.
- Genres: Southern hip-hop; trap; gangsta rap
- Occupations: Rapper; singer; songwriter
- Years active: 2018–present
- Labels: Bread Gang; Loaf Boyz; Foxes Only; 10K Projects

Cavon Deshawn Paige (born May 28, 2001), known professionally as YTB Fatt (initialism for Young Track Boy Fatt), is an American rapper, singer, and songwriter. Raised in West Memphis, Arkansas, he signed with Moneybagg Yo's Bread Gang in 2023, and rose to mainstream fame with his single, "Shot Off Gumbo" (featuring Moneybagg Yo and Fat Wizza), that same year.

== Early life ==
Cavon Paige was born on May 28, 2001, in West Memphis, Arkansas. In an interview, Paige revealed that he began experimenting in the studio at 16, but didn't pursue hip-hop seriously until three years later, at 19.

== Career ==
Fatt began his career in 2019, starting to rap in early summer 2019. He released original songs, which earned him an audience. In January 2023, Fatt signed with Moneybagg Yo's label Bread Gang Entertainment. In March 2023, Fatt released the single "Shot Off Gumbo" on March 10, 2023, alongside the music video. The single featured Moneybagg Yo and Fat Wizza. In April 2023, Fatt released the single "Get Back". It boosted Fatt's popularity, with over 13 million views on YouTube and over 30,000 views on TikTok, receiving cosigns from Lil Durk, B.G., and the Cincinnati Bengals. His single "Shot Off Gumbo" was included on Moneybagg Yo's Hard to Love mixtape released in June 2023.

On June 2, 2023, Fatt was featured on Moneybagg Yo's single "Rock Out", alongside rapper Lil Durk. On July 4, 2023, Fatt released "Calm It Down". Seven days later, on July 11, he released "Us" featuring Big Homiie G. He released "Bet I Whip It" featuring Rob49 on July 18, 2023. On July 21, he was featured on Yante Montana's "UFO". In July 25, he released "Backstabbin".

On August 8, 2023, Fatt released his debut mixtape, Who is Fatt. It debuted at number four on the Billboard Heatseekers Albums charts. On August 10, 2023, Fatt released "Poppin It Hard". He released Who Is Fatt (extended clip) on August 18, 2023. Fatt was featured on Hopout Shawn "Pose" in September with accompanying music video.

On September 29, 2023, Fatt was featured alongside Sett on Finesse2tymes' "Can't Go To Jail". Fatt was featured on Lil Poppa's "4 Day Money" alongside CMG The Label. Fatt released the project, Fox Prelude, on October 20, 2023. Seven days later, he released "Let's See". Fatt collaborated with rapper Lil Durk and the label Only The Family, appearing on "Last One" off the compilation album Nightmares in the Trenches on November 17, 2023. In December, he was featured on Real Boston Richey's "The Type", and Mike Will Made It's "Now or Neva" alongside Moneybagg Yo. On December 15, 2023, Fatt released the mixtape Foxes Only, featuring Lil Yachty, BabyDrill, and GloRilla.

On February 14, 2024, Fatt released "I Luv U". On March 9, 2024, Fatt was featured on fellow rapper DeeBaby's single "Oil Change". On March 26, 2024, he released the single "Same", which samples Usher and R. Kelly's song "Same Girl". On April 9, 2024, he was also featured on OT7 Quanny's single "I Did It". On May 14, 2024, Fatt released a new single, "In the Air", featuring Alabama rapper Rylo Rodriguez, with an accompanying music video.

In June, Fatt released "Get Up On It". On June 28, 2024, Fatt released "Score". On July 3, 2024, Fatt released "Pretty Brown" featuring Lil Baby and Rylo Rodriguez. The next day, he released "What Happened" featuring Lil Baby. On July 5, 2024, Fatt released his third mixtape On Zai, which debuted at 133 on the Billboard 200. On July 26, Fatt released "Conspiracy V2" featuring Lil Durk. In August, Fatt released "Free Bank", followed by the EP On Zai (Deluxe) on August 30, 2024.

On November 19, 2024, Fatt released the extended play The Richest Foxx, which features a sole guest appearance from Quavo.

== Discography ==
=== Mixtapes ===
List of mixtapes, with selected details
Title	Mixtape details	Peak chart positions
Title	Mixtape details	US
Who Is Fatt	Released: August 8, 2023; Label: Loaf Boyz, 10K Projects; Formats: Digital download, streaming	—
Foxes Only	Released: December 15, 2023; Label: Loaf Boyz, 10K Projects; Formats: Digital download, streaming	—
On Zai	Released: July 5, 2024; Label: Loaf Boyz, 10K Projects; Formats: Digital download, streaming	133
Da Foxprint	Released: June 20, 2025; Label: Loaf Boyz, 10K Projects; Formats: Digital download, streaming	—
Vera Volpe	Released: August 14, 2026; Label: Loaf Boyz, 10K Projects; Formats: Digital download, streaming	—

=== Extended plays ===
List of extended plays, with selected details
Title	EP details
Fox Prelude	Released: October 20, 2023; Label: Loaf Boyz Ventures/10K Projects; Formats: Digital download, streaming
The Richest Foxx	Released: November 19, 2024; Label: Loaf Boyz Ventures/10K Projects; Formats: Digital download, streaming
