= Me vs Me (song) =

2020 single by MoneyBagg Yo

Single by Moneybagg Yo

from the album Time Served
- Released: May 8, 2020
- Length: 3:03
- Label: Interscope; N-Less
- Songwriters: Demario White, Jr.; Christopher Pearson
- Producer: YC

Moneybagg Yo singles chronology
"Blue Jean Bandit" (2020)	"Me vs Me" (2020)	"Main Slime (Remix)" (2020)

Music video
- "Me vs Me" on YouTube

"Me vs Me" is a song by American rapper Moneybagg Yo from his third studio album Time Served (2020). It was released on May 8, 2020, as the fourth single from the album, and the only single from the deluxe edition from the album. A music video of the song was released on the same day. It has over 145 million views as of September 2022.

== Charts ==
Chart (2020)	Peak position
US Billboard Hot 100	88
US Hot R&B/Hip-Hop Songs (Billboard)	41

== Certifications ==
Region	Certification	Certified units/sales
United States (RIAA)	4× Platinum	4,000,000^{‡}
^{‡} Sales+streaming figures based on certification alone.
