= Snipe Young =

American record producer from Georgia

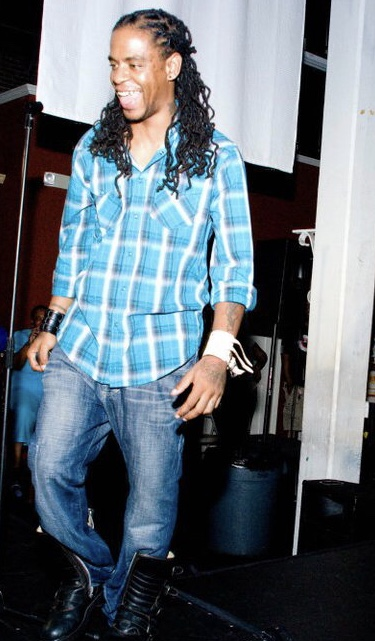
- Young in Birmingham, AL in 2016

Background information
- Also known as: Snipe Young
- Born: Lawrence Gary Young Jr. August 20, 1990 (age 35); Birmingham, Alabama, United States
- Genres: Hip hop, R&B, pop, soul
- Occupation(s): Record producer, songwriter
- Instrument(s): keyboard, piano, guitar, bass, drums, percussion
- Labels: Ahh Haa/Universal Music Group

Lawrence Gary Young Jr. (born August 20, 1990), known professionally as Snipe Young, is an American record producer from Birmingham, Alabama. He is currently based in Los Angeles, California and signed to Ahh Haa/Universal Music Group. Snipe Young has engineered, written, produced, and created custom sound design for artists including Nicki Minaj, Flo Rida, Chris Brown, Justin Bieber, Vinnie Paz, Eamon, Beyonce, the television network Nickelodeon, and the ABC sitcom Black-ish.

== Early life and career ==
Young was born and raised in Birmingham, Alabama. He has been playing music since the age of four and grew up in churches playing drums. Snipe studied music technology at the University of Alabama at Birmingham.

Young has worked with artists including Nicki Minaj, Flo Rida, Chris Brown, Beyonce, The Game, Justin Bieber, Vinnie Paz, Dr. Dre, Eamon, and many more.

Snipe Young won a Grammy Award for his sound design engineering on Beyonce's 2017 album Lemonade.

Outside of his production work, Snipe Young has curated production expansion packs such as: Native Instruments' Maschine Golden Kingdom, Lilac Glare, Street Swarm, Infamous Flow, Pure Drip, Akai Mpc's Dark Parallax 1, Dark Parallax 2, and Air Technology's Hybrid Dark Parallax and Urban Voyage.
