= U Played =

2020 single by Moneybagg Yo featuring Lil Baby

Single by Moneybagg Yo featuring Lil Baby

from the album Time Served
- Released: January 3, 2020
- Genre: Hip hop; trap
- Length: 2:45
- Label: Interscope; N-Less
- Songwriters: Demario White, Jr.; Dominique Jones; Brytavious Chambers
- Producer: Tay Keith

Moneybagg Yo singles chronology
"Camelot" (remix) (2019)	"U Played" (2020)	"1 2 3" (2020)

Lil Baby singles chronology
"Highest in the Room" (remix) (2019)	"U Played" (2020)	"Sum 2 Prove" (2020)

Music video
- "U Played" on YouTube

"U Played" is a song by American rapper Moneybagg Yo featuring American rapper Lil Baby. It was released on January 3, 2020 as the second single from Moneybagg Yo's third studio album Time Served (2020). The song was produced by Tay Keith.

== Composition ==
Charlie Zhang of Hypebeast has described the production of the song having a "a mid-tempo trap beat laced with blaring 808s, ghoulish synths and crisp snares." Alex Zidel of HotNewHipHop wrote that Moneybagg Yo is "fully flexing an avoidant attachment style" and "refusing to get too close to his potential lover" in the hook. Lil Baby is "showing off his diamond teeth" and "delivering yet another impressive display."

== Charts ==
On the week of January 25, 2020, "U Played" peaked at numbers 23 and 53 on both the Billboard Hot R&B/Hip-Hop Songs and Hot 100 charts respectively, remaining on both charts for five weeks.

Chart (2020)	Peak position
US Billboard Hot 100	53
US Hot R&B/Hip-Hop Songs (Billboard)	23

== Certifications ==
Region	Certification	Certified units/sales
United States (RIAA)	2× Platinum	2,000,000^{‡}
^{‡} Sales+streaming figures based on certification alone.
