= 2 Federal =

Mixtape by Moneybagg Yo and Yo Gotti
- Released: October 31, 2016
- Genres: Hip hop; trap
- Length: 61:01
- Labels: N-Less; CMG
- Producers: Ben Billions; Dmactoobangin; Gezin; Infamous; K Swisha; Karltin Bankz; Kickin J; Mitch Mula; Schife Karbeen; Tay Keith; TM88; YS Trakkz

Moneybagg Yo chronology
4 The Hard Way (2016)	2 Federal (2016)	Heartless (2017)

Yo Gotti chronology
The Art of Hustle (2016)	2 Federal (2016)	White Friday (CM9) (2016)

2 Federal is a collaborative mixtape by American rappers Moneybagg Yo and Yo Gotti. The mixtape was released on October 31, 2016, by N-Less Entertainment and Collective Music Group. It features a sole guest appearance from Blac Youngsta. Meanwhile, the mixtape's production was handled by members of 808 Mafia such as Gezin and TM88, K Swisha, Karltin Bankz, Ben Billions, and Tay Keith, among others. This album serves as the second installment of his Federal series.

== Track listing ==
Credits were adapted from Tidal.

2 Federal
No.	Title	Producer(s)	Length
1.	"Can't Do It"	Karltin Bankz	2:48
2.	"No Features"	Gezin	2:41
3.	"Afta While"	Tay Keith	3:08
4.	"Pull Up"	K Swisha	3:01
5.	"Doin 2 Much"	Karltin Bankz	3:24
6.	"Da City"	Kickin J	4:02
7.	"Reflection"	Karltin Bankz	3:11
8.	"Section"	Karltin Bankz	2:53
9.	"Neva Again"	TM88	3:04
10.	"Gang Gang" (performed by Moneybagg Yo featuring Blac Youngsta)	Tay Keith	3:12
11.	"Mitch" (performed by Yo Gotti)	Mitch Mula	3:13
12.	"Facts"	Ben Billions; Infamous; Schife Karbeen	3:22
13.	"Narley" (performed by Moneybagg Yo)	YS Trakkz	2:45
14.	"My OG"	K Swisha	3:17
15.	"No Dealings" (performed by Moneybagg Yo)	Tay Keith	3:16
16.	"Olympics"	K Swisha	3:54
17.	"Lil Baby" (performed by Moneybagg Yo)	YS Trakkz	3:26
18.	"Vibes" (performed by Moneybagg Yo)	Dmactoobangin	3:31
19.	"Prayers"	Dmactoobangin	2:53
Total length:			61:01

== Charts ==
Chart (2017)	Peak position
US Billboard 200	97
US Top R&B/Hip-Hop Albums (Billboard)	48
