= Hard to Love (mixtape) =

Mixtape by Moneybagg Yo
- Released: June 2, 2023
- Genre: Hip-hop; trap
- Length: 55:48
- Label: Roc Nation; CMG; Bread Gang; N-Less; Interscope
- Producer: AyTeez; David Morse; DMacTooBangin; DrumGod; Evrgrn; G1; Harrison Song; Haze; HitmanAudio; James Maddocks; Julien Anderson; KJLetTheBeatKnock; Kozoy; Lofey; LondnBlue; MoXart Beatz; Nate808; Phil G.; Prod Tale; Rickk Romero; Rjayy; Ronny J; Skywalker OG; Tahj Money; T-Head; UpNorth; Xonosleep; YC; Young Culture Beats; Yung Dee; Yung Lan

Moneybagg Yo chronology
A Gangsta's Pain (2021)	Hard to Love (2023)	Speak Now (2024)

Singles from Hard to Love
- 1. "Quickie" Released: December 8, 2022; 2. "On Wat U On" Released: January 12, 2023; 3. "Shot Off Gumbo" Released: March 10, 2023; 4. "Motion God" Released: April 21, 2023; 5. "Ocean Spray" Released: May 24, 2023

Hard to Love is the sixteenth mixtape by American rapper Moneybagg Yo. It was released on June 2, 2023, by Roc Nation, Collective Music Group (CMG), Bread Gang Entertainment, N-Less Entertainment, and Interscope Records. The mixtape features guest appearances from Future, Fridayy, YTB Fatt, Fat Wizza, Lil Durk, and GloRilla. Meanwhile, production on the mixtape was handled by DMacTooBangin, DrumGod, YC, Skywalker OG, T-Head, HitmanAudio, Tahj Money, LondnBlue, and Ronny J, among others.

The mixtape was supported by five singles: "Quickie", "On Wat U On" with GloRilla, "Shot Off Gumbo" with YTB Fatt and Fat Wizza, "Motion God", and "Ocean Spray". The mixtape debuted at number 10 on the US Billboard 200, earning 51,000 album-equivalent units in its first week.

== Background ==
On December 30, 2022, the upcoming project was teased, after Moneybagg Yo replied to a tweet on Twitter about the project, where he tweeted: "Sooner than you think 🚀".

Plus, on January 8, 2023, Moneybagg tweeted: "My Album Is A Heartless Edition Hope Y’all Ready💔🖤🔥". And, he continues to tease the album after Moneybagg tweeted: "I swear y'all gone love this album".

On May 10, 2023, he announced on Twitter that his mixtape Hard to Love would release on May 26, and his forthcoming fifth studio album would be released soon this year. Then, he announced on an Instagram post that the project was pushed back to June 2, due to Taylor Swift's re-release of her 2022 record Midnights.

== Release and promotion ==
=== Singles ===
The lead single from the mixtape, "Quickie", was released on December 8, 2022, as well as an accompanying music video. The song was produced by Skywalker OG. The song did not enter the Billboard Hot 100, but peaked at number one on the Bubbling Under Hot 100 chart on December 24, 2022, which is Moneybagg Yo's second number one on the chart overall. The song also peaked at number 49 on the Hot R&B/Hip-Hop Songs chart. And, the song was certified gold by the Recording Industry Association of America (RIAA) for combined sales of over 500,000 units in the United States.

The second single from the mixtape, "On Wat U On" with Memphis rapper GloRilla, was released on January 12, 2023, with an accompanying music video. The song was produced by YC, Skywalker OG and DrumGod. The song opened at number 56 on the Billboard Hot 100 and at number 21 on the Hot R&B/Hip-Hop Songs chart.

The third single from the mixtape, "Shot Off Gumbo" with YTB Fatt and Fat Wizza, was released on March 10, 2023, with an accompanying music video. The song was produced by Yung Dee, Evrgrn and Rjayy.

The fourth single from the mixtape, "Motion God", was released on April 21, 2023, with an accompanying music video. The song was produced by Skywalker OG and T-Head. The song did not enter the Billboard Hot 100, but peaked at number 12 on the Bubbling Under Hot 100 chart, and peaked at number 38 on the Hot R&B/Hip-Hop Songs chart.

The fifth single from the mixtape, "Ocean Spray", was released on May 24, 2023, with an accompanying music video. The song was produced by DMacTooBangin. The song opened at number 69 on the Billboard Hot 100, and opened at number 26 on the Hot R&B/Hip-Hop Songs chart.

=== Promotional singles ===
The mixtape's lead promotional single, "Keep It Low" featuring Future, was released on June 1, 2022. The song was produced by DrumGod, Skywalker OG, T-Head and Young Culture Beats. The song opened at number 59 on the Billboard Hot 100 and at number 19 on the Hot R&B/Hip-Hop Songs chart.

== Commercial performance ==
Hard to Love debuted at number 10 on the US Billboard 200 chart, earning 51,000 album-equivalent units (with 2,500 pure album sales) in its first week, which became Moneybagg Yo's sixth US top-10 project. The album was also accumulated a total of 66.56 million on-demand audio streams for its songs in its first debut week.

== Track listing ==
Hard to Love track listing
No.	Title	Writer(s)	Producer(s)	Length
1.	"They Say"	Demario Dewayne White Jr.; Thomas Walker; Christopher Pearson; Nicolas Berlinger	Skywalker OG; YC; MoXart Beatz	3:36
2.	"Keep It Low" (featuring Future)	White Jr.; Nayvadius Wilburn; Robert Gullatt; Walker; Taureon Hailey; Iriia Tsurusaki	DrumGod; Skywalker OG; T-Head; Young Culture Beats	2:22
3.	"F My BM"	White Jr.; Anders Christiansen; Nicolai Andersen; Kaspen Knudsen	UpNorth	3:03
4.	"Ocean Spray"	White Jr.; Dylan McKinney; Jordan Houston; Lexus Lewis	DMacTooBangin	2:45
5.	"Lies" (featuring Fridayy)	White Jr.; Francis Leblanc; Tahj Vaughn; Walker	Tahj Money; Skywaker OG	3:03
6.	"Still"	White Jr.; Walker; Jeuan Tabarrejo; Nathaniel Hobden; Amman Nurani	Skywalker OG; G1; Nate808; Evrgrn^{[a]}	3:04
7.	"Sholl Is"	White Jr.; Henry; Harrison Hao-Xu Song; Nurani	Yung Dee; Harrison Song; Evrgrn	2:59
8.	"Free Lil A (Interlude)"	White Jr.; Hailey; Giuseppe Vitolo	T-Head; Rickk Romero	1:28
9.	"Hurt Man"	White Jr.; Milan Modi; Henry; Rondreze Hicks; James Maddocks	Yung Lan; Yung Dee; Rjayy; Maddocks	2:01
10.	"Shot Off Gumbo" (with YTB Fatt and Fat Wizza)	White Jr.; Cavon Paige; Marcus Jones; Henry; Nurani; Hicks	Yung Dee; Evrgrn; Rjayy	3:00
11.	"No Show"	White Jr.; Marko Trajkovski; Quentin Makai	AyTeez; Kozoy; Prod Tale^{[a]}	2:21
12.	"Where Ya B @"	White Jr.; Gregory Sanders Jr.; Julien Anderson; D. Carlton; D. Pannell; J. Houston; P. Beauregard	HitmanAudio; Anderson	3:07
13.	"Goin Thru It"	White Jr.; Vaughn; Sterling Reynolds	Tahj Money; LondnBlue	2:44
14.	"Rock Out" (featuring Lil Durk and YTB Fatt)	White Jr.; Durk Banks; Paige; Hailey; Ronald Spence Jr.	T-Head; Ronny J	2:26
15.	"Super Wet"	White Jr.; Hailey; Phillip Gooch; Niemah Khadija Muhammad	T-Head; Phil G.	3:09
16.	"Motion God"	White Jr.; Walker; Hailey	Skywalker OG; T-Head	2:22
17.	"Nun Like Me"	White Jr.; Xabian Woods; Aaron Sandlofer	Xonosleep; Lofey	3:05
18.	"Quickie"	White Jr.; Walker	Skywalker OG	3:08
19.	"On Wat U On" (with GloRilla)	White Jr.; Gloria Woods; Walker; Pearson; Gullatt	Skywalker OG; YC; DrumGod	2:40
20.	"More Sick"	White Jr.; Walker; Kevin Davis; David Morse	Skywalker OG; KJLetTheBeatKnock; Morse	3:24
Total length:				55:48

=== Notes ===
- ^{^[a]} signifies a co-producer

== Charts ==
=== Weekly charts ===
Weekly chart performance for Hard to Love
Chart (2023)	Peak position
Canadian Albums (Billboard)	74
US Billboard 200	10
US Top R&B/Hip-Hop Albums (Billboard)	4

=== Year-end charts ===
Year-end chart performance for Hard to Love
Chart (2023)	Position
US Billboard 200	167
US Top R&B/Hip-Hop Albums (Billboard)	55

== Certifications ==
Certifications for Hard To Love
Region	Certification	Certified units/sales
United States (RIAA)	Gold	500,000^{‡}
^{‡} Sales+streaming figures based on certification alone.
