= Lance Taylor (footballer) =

Australian rules footballer

Personal information
- Full name: Lance Taylor
- Born: 4 May 1952 (age 74)
- Original team: Oakleigh
- Height: 170 cm (5 ft 7 in)
- Weight: 75 kg (165 lb)

Playing career^{1}
Years	Club	Games (Goals)
1974	St Kilda	5 (1)
- ^{1} Playing statistics correct to the end of 1974.

Lance Taylor (born 4 May 1952) is a former Australian rules footballer who played with St Kilda in the Victorian Football League (VFL).
