= Time Served (album) =

Studio album by Moneybagg Yo
- Released: January 10, 2020
- Recorded: 2019–2020
- Genre: Hip hop; trap
- Length: 41:15
- Label: Roc Nation; CMG; Bread Gang; N-Less; Interscope
- Producer: 30 Roc; Angel; Denaro Love; DJ Chose; DMacTooBangin; DruAmarda; DTB; Fuse; Hardbody; Jaded; Javar Rockamore; JB; KD6; K-Major; Tahj Money; Tay Keith; Track Gordy; X.O.; YC

Moneybagg Yo chronology
43va Heartless (2019)	Time Served (2020)	Code Red (2020)

Singles from Time Served
- 1. "All Dat" Released: October 10, 2019; 2. "U Played" Released: January 3, 2020; 3. "1 2 3" Released: April 14, 2020; 4. "Me vs Me" Released: May 8, 2020

Time Served is the third studio album by American rapper Moneybagg Yo. It was released on January 10, 2020, through Roc Nation, Collective Music Group, Bread Gang Entertainment, N-Less Entertainment, and Interscope Records. The album features collaborations with Lil Baby, Blac Youngsta, Future, DaBaby, Summer Walker, Fredo Bang, and Megan Thee Stallion. The production on the album was handled by Tay Keith, 30 Roc, and DMacTooBangin, among others. The deluxe edition was released on May 15, 2020, featuring some additional guest appearances from Big Homiie G, Big30, and Rylo Rodriguez.

== Release ==
Moneybagg Yo first teased the album's release in an Instagram post on December 19, 2019. He later on confirmed the album's title, release date, and track list in now-deleted Instagram posts from January 8 and 9, 2020.

== Singles ==
"All Dat", a collaboration between himself, and a now-ex-girlfriend and a fellow American rapper Megan Thee Stallion, was released as the album's lead single on October 10, 2019. Its accompanying music video was released on the same day. The song was produced by Denaro Love.

"U Played", a collaboration between himself and a fellow American rapper Lil Baby, was released as the album's second single on January 3, 2020. The song was produced by Tay Keith. An accompanying music video was released on January 13, 2020.

"1 2 3", a collaboration between himself and a fellow American rapper Blac Youngsta, was sent to rhythmic contemporary radio as the third single from the album on April 14, 2020.

"Me vs Me" was released as the lead and only single from the deluxe edition of the album on May 8, 2020.

== Commercial performance ==
Time Served debuted at number three on the US Billboard 200, earning 66,000 album-equivalent units (with 7,000 in pure album sales) in its first week. This became Moneybagg Yo's third US top-ten debut. The album also accumulated a total of 84.1 million on-demand streams for the set's songs during the week. In its second week, the album fell to number seven on the chart, earning an additional 37,000 units. In its third week, the album fell to number nine on the chart, earning 31,000 more units. On August 18, 2020, the album was certified Platinum by the Recording Industry Association of America (RIAA) for combined sales and album-equivalent units of over 1,000,000 units in the United States.

== Track listing ==
Time Served track listing
No.	Title	Writer(s)	Producer(s)	Length
1.	"Speak 4 Em"	Demario White, Jr.; Christopher Pearson; Dylan McKinney; Jarven Harris	DMacTooBangin; Javar; Track Gordy; YC	2:22
2.	"U Played" (featuring Lil Baby)	White; Dominique Jones; Brytavious Chambers	Tay Keith	2:45
3.	"Pop My Shit"	White; Pearson	YC	2:50
4.	"Pistol by da Bed"	White; David Teel	DTB	2:00
5.	"1 2 3" (featuring Blac Youngsta)	White; Sammie Benson; Xabian Woods	XO	2:36
6.	"Match My Fly"	White; Teel	DTB	3:13
7.	"Thinking Out Loud"	White; Angel Morales; Brandon Swandal; Justin Bradbury; Kadaivion Dixon	Angel; JB; Jaded; KD6	3:04
8.	"Federal Fed" (featuring Future)	White; Nayvadius Wilburn; McKinney	DMacTooBangin	3:30
9.	"Bitch"	White; McKinney	DMacTooBangin	2:04
10.	"Protect da Brand" (featuring DaBaby)	White; Jonathan Kirk; Pearson	YC	3:00
11.	"Thug Cry"	White; Andrew Porter; Javar Rockamore; Robert Reese; Tahj Vaugh	Javar; Taj	3:50
12.	"Dem People Freestyle"	White; Samuel Gloade	30 Roc	1:52
13.	"Real Luv" (featuring Summer Walker)	White; Summer Walker; Eduardo Earle; Kendricke Brown	Fuse; K Major	3:20
14.	"Spin on Em" (featuring Fredo Bang)	White; Fredrick Givens; Hardbody; Norman Payne	DJ Chose; Hardbody	2:25
15.	"All Dat" (with Megan Thee Stallion)	White; Megan Pete; Jamichael Bendon	Denaro Love	2:24
Total length:				41:15

Deluxe bonus tracks
No.	Title	Writer(s)	Producer(s)	Length
1.	"Issa No (375 Flow)"	White; Donovan Hardie	Pablomcr; JR HitMaker	2:44
2.	"Me vs Me"	White; Pearson	YC	3:03
3.	"Kut Like Dat" (featuring Big Homiie G)	White; Deondre Speaks; Pearson	YC	2:50
4.	"Boffum" (featuring Big 30)	White; Rodney Wright, Jr.; McKinney	DMacTooBangin	2:54
5.	"Cold Shoulder"	White; McKinney; Rockamore	DMacTooBangin; Javar	3:00
6.	"No Chill" (featuring Lil Baby and Rylo Rodriguez)	White; Jones; Ryan Adams; Joshua Luellen	Southside	3:19
7.	"Yomii"	White; McKinney	DMacTooBangin	2:30
Total length:				1:01:17

== Charts ==
=== Weekly charts ===
Chart performance for Time Served
Chart (2020)	Peak position
Canadian Albums (Billboard)	35
US Billboard 200	3
US Top R&B/Hip-Hop Albums (Billboard)	2
US Top Rap Albums (Billboard)	3

=== Year-end charts ===
2020 year-end chart performance for Time Served
Chart (2020)	Position
US Billboard 200	52
US Top R&B/Hip-Hop Albums (Billboard)	33

2021 year-end chart performance for Time Served
Chart (2021)	Position
US Billboard 200	169

== Certifications ==
Certifications for Time Served
Region	Certification	Certified units/sales
United States (RIAA)	Platinum	1,000,000^{‡}
^{‡} Sales+streaming figures based on certification alone.
