= All Dat =

2019 single by Moneybagg Yo and Megan Thee Stallion

Single by Moneybagg Yo and Megan Thee Stallion

from the album Time Served
- Released: October 10, 2019
- Length: 2:23
- Label: Interscope; N-Less
- Songwriters: Demario White, Jr.; Megan Pete; Jamichael Bendon
- Producer: Denaro Love

Moneybagg Yo singles chronology
| "Crank Up 2.0" (2019) | "All Dat" (2019) | "Hocus Pocus" (2019) |

Megan Thee Stallion singles chronology
| "Big Booty" (2019) | "All Dat" (2019) | "Ride Or Die" (2019) |

Music video
- "All Dat" on YouTube

"All Dat" is a song by American rappers Moneybagg Yo and Megan Thee Stallion. It was released on October 10, 2019, as the lead single from the former's third studio album, Time Served (2020). It is his first single as a lead artist to chart on the US Billboard Hot 100, peaking at number 70.

== Music video ==
A video for the song was released on October 10, 2019. It shows Moneybagg and Megan getting "close" and "comfortable" on the compound of their seaside mansion that overlooks a beautiful ocean.

== Charts ==
| Chart (2019) | Peak position |
|---|---|
| US Billboard Hot 100 | 70 |
| US Hot R&B/Hip-Hop Songs (Billboard) | 34 |
| US R&B/Hip-Hop Airplay (Billboard) | 21 |

== Certifications ==
| Region | Certification | Certified units/sales |
|---|---|---|
| United States (RIAA) | 2× Platinum | 2,000,000^{‡} |
^{‡} Sales+streaming figures based on certification alone.
