= Reset (Moneybagg Yo album) =

Studio album by Moneybagg Yo
- Released: November 2, 2018
- Genres: Hip hop; Memphis rap
- Length: 43:36
- Labels: CMG; BGE; N-Less; Interscope
- Producers: Ben Billions; Bobby Reese; DMacTooBangin; DrumGod; DY; Eduardo Earle Jr.; Hitmaka; Javar Rockamore; Retro Future; Rvssian; Southside; Tay Keith; Theodore Thomas; TrePounds; Wheezy

Moneybagg Yo chronology
Bet On Me (2018)	Reset (2018)	43va Heartless (2019)

Reset is the debut studio album by American rapper Moneybagg Yo. It was released on November 2, 2018, through Collective Music Group, N-Less Entertainment, Bread Gang Entertainment, and Interscope Records. The production the album was handled by multiple producers including Hitmaka, Tay Keith, Wheezy, Southside, Ben Billions and Rvssian among others. The album also features guest appearances from J. Cole, Future, Kodak Black, YG, Kevin Gates, Rvssian, and Jeremih.

Reset was preceded by one single, "Okay". The album received mixed reviews from music critics and was a moderate commercial success. It debuted at number 13 on the US Billboard 200 and number eight on the US Top R&B/Hip-Hop Albums charts, earning 31,000 album-equivalent units in its first week.

== Promotion ==
=== Singles ===
"Okay", a collaboration between himself and a fellow American rapper Future, was released as the album's lead single on September 21, 2018. An accompanying music video was released on November 2, 2018, the date of the album's release.

=== Other songs ===
The music video for "Say Na", featuring J. Cole, was released on November 13, 2018. The music video for "Reset" was released on December 24, 2018. The music video for "Lower Level", featuring Kodak Black, was released on February 1, 2019.

== Critical reception ==
Professional ratings
Review scores
Source	Rating
HotNewHipHop	82%

Narsimha Chintaluri of HotNewHipHop called the album "a high-octane spectacle", saying that although it was "a bit long-winded", the album was "well-sequenced for the most part". Chris Gibbons of XXL gave the album a more mixed review, saying that it was a "solid outing", saying that one of his biggest strengths is timing", but said "it would be nice if he were a bit more ambitious", and that "there wasn't much here that separated it from his previous material".

== Commercial performance ==
Reset debuted at number 13 on the US Billboard 200 and number eight on US Top R&B/Hip-Hop Albums charts, earning 31,000 album-equivalent units (with 5,000 in pure album sales) in its first week. The album also accumulated a total of 33.1 million streams for the album's songs that week.

== Track listing ==
No.	Title	Writer(s)	Producer(s)	Length
1.	"Oh Fuck"	Demario White; Dyllan McKinney	DMacTooBangin	1:50
2.	"Say Na" (featuring J. Cole)	White; Jermaine Cole; Javar Rockmore; Robert Gullatt; Thomas Walker	Drumgod; Javar Rockamore	2:40
3.	"They Madd"	White; Brytavious Chambers	Tay Keith	3:09
4.	"Chanel Junkie" (featuring Future)	White; Nayvadius Wilburn; Bobby Reese; Rockmore; Gullatt; Walker	Drumgod; Rockamore	3:13
5.	"Midnight Patek"	White; Reese; Eduardo Earle; Rockmore; Theodore Thomas	Fuse; Loopholes	3:07
6.	"In Her Voice"	White; Gullatt	Drumgod	2:50
7.	"Reset"	White; Wesley Glass	Wheezy; Southside^{[a]}	2:06
8.	"Lower Level" (featuring Kodak Black)	White; Dieuson Octave; Benjamin Diehl	Ben Billions	4:17
9.	"Curry Jersey" (featuring YG)	White; Keenon Jackson; Gullatt	Drumgod	2:42
10.	"Jungle"	White; Reese; Earle; Thomas	Fuse	2:49
11.	"Fall Down" (featuring Kevin Gates and Rvssian)	White; Kevin Gates; Tarik Johnston	Rvssian	3:01
12.	"Industry"	White; Gullatt	Drumgod	3:04
13.	"Okay" (featuring Future)	White; Wilburn; Dwan Avery; Jeff Lacroix	DY; Tre Pounds	2:31
14.	"Tryna Do" (featuring Jeremih)	White; Jeremih Felton; Christian Ward; Teddy Pena	RetroFuture	3:16
15.	"7even"	White; Reese; Gullatt; Walker	Drumgod; Loopholes	3:01
Total length:				43:36

Notes

- ^{^[a]} signifies an uncredited co-producer

== Charts ==
Chart (2018)	Peak position
US Billboard 200	13
US Top R&B/Hip-Hop Albums (Billboard)	8
