= Federal 3X =

Mixtape by Moneybagg Yo
- Released: August 11, 2017
- Genre: Hip hop
- Length: 44:19
- Label: Collective; BGE; N-Less Entertainment; Interscope
- Producer: Dmactoobangin; DY; Karltin Bankz; Northside; Tay Keith; TM88; Track Gordy; Rex Kudo

Moneybagg Yo chronology
Heartless (2017)	Federal 3X (2017)	2 Heartless (2018)

Federal 3X is the twelfth mixtape by American rapper Moneybagg Yo. It was released on August 11, 2017, by Collective Music Group, Bread Gang Entertainment, N-Less Entertainment, and Interscope Records, serving as his first commercial release with Interscope.

This mixtape serves as the third installment in his Federal series.

== Commercial performance ==
Federal 3X debuted at number five on the US Billboard 200 chart, earning 30,000 album-equivalent units (with 14,000 in pure album sales) in its first week. This became Moneybagg Yo's first US top-ten album.

== Track listing ==
Federal 3X track listing
No.	Title	Producer(s)	Length
1.	"Vent" (Flex Freestyle)	DY	2:21
2.	"Important"	Tay Keith	2:25
3.	"Trending"	Dmactoobangin	3:27
4.	"Doin' It"	Tay Keith	2:48
5.	"Blog"	Dmactoobangin	3:01
6.	"Insecure"	Dmactoobangin	3:27
7.	"Foreal"	TM88; Rex Kudo	3:06
8.	"On Me"	DY	2:59
9.	"Side Bitches"	Dmactoobangin	3:24
10.	"Mind Frame"	Dmactoobangin	3:16
11.	"Reckless" (featuring YoungBoy Never Broke Again)	Karltin Bankz	2:48
12.	"Mad Face Sad Face"	Dmactoobangin	2:09
13.	"Lately"	Northside	2:26
14.	"Hoe House"	Dmactoobangin	3:27
15.	"Right Now"	Track Gordy	3:11
Total length:			44:19

== Charts ==
=== Weekly charts ===
Chart (2017)	Peak position
US Billboard 200	5
US Top R&B/Hip-Hop Albums (Billboard)	4

=== Year-end charts ===
Chart (2017)	Position
US Top R&B/Hip-Hop Albums (Billboard)	98
