= 2 Heartless =

Mixtape by Moneybagg Yo
- Released: February 14, 2018
- Genre: Hip hop
- Length: 50:44
- Label: CMG; BGE; N-Less; Interscope
- Producer: Ben Billions; DJ Swift; Dmactoobangin; Fuse; Javar Rockamore; Southside; Stonii Romo; Tay Keith; Track Gordy; Zaytoven

Moneybagg Yo chronology
Federal 3X (2017)	2 Heartless (2018)	Bet On Me (2018)

2 Heartless is the thirteenth mixtape by American rapper Moneybagg Yo. It was released on February 14, 2018, by Collective Music Group, Bread Gang Entertainment, N-Less Entertainment and Interscope Records, serving as his second commercial release with Interscope although Interscope refers the mixtape an album after the streaming success. The mixtape features guest appearances from Yo Gotti, Lil Baby, BlocBoy JB, and Quavo. The production lists Southside, Tay Keith, DJ Swift, Dmactoobangin, Track Gordy, Javar Rockmore and Fuse, among others.

This mixtape serves as the sequel to Heartless.

== Background ==
On February 11, 2018, Moneybagg Yo unveiled the mixtape's tracklist and release date via Instagram.

== Promotion ==
=== Tour ===
On March 6, 2018, Moneybagg Yo announced an official headlining concert tour to further promote the album titled 2 Heartless Tour. The tour began on April 7 in Rochester, at Main Street Armory.

Tour dates
Date	City	Venue
North America
April 7, 2018	Rochester	Main Street Armory
April 8, 2018	Philadelphia	Fillmore
April 10, 2018	Toronto	Drake Hotel
April 11, 2018	Phoenix	Pub Rock Live
April 12, 2018	Santa Barbara	Velvet Jones
April 15, 2018	San Francisco	Slim's
April 16, 2018	San Diego	House of Blues
April 17, 2018	Anaheim	House of Blues
April 18, 2018	Sacramento	Harlow's
April 20, 2018	Los Angeles	El Rey Theatre
April 21, 2018	Las Vegas	Hard Rock Cafe
April 22, 2018	Salt Lake City	In The Venue
April 23, 2018	Denver	The Roxy Theatre
April 25, 2018	Detroit	The Shelter
April 26, 2018	Grand Rapids	The Stache
April 27, 2018	St. Louis	Pops
April 28, 2018	Cincinnati	Avenue
April 29, 2018	New York City	Gramercy Theatre
May 1, 2018	Washington	Tropicalia
May 2, 2018	Greensboro	Green Street
May 3, 2018	Raleigh	Lincoln
May 4, 2018	Norfolk	Origami
May 5, 2018	Augusta	Sky City
May 6, 2018	Orlando	Sound Bar
May 7, 2018	Tampa	Whiskey North
May 8, 2018	Atlanta	Masquerade
May 9, 2018	Birmingham	Workplay
May 10, 2018	Jackson	The Hideaway
May 11, 2018	Memphis	The New Daisy Theatre

== Critical reception ==
Professional ratings
Review scores
Source	Rating
Pitchfork	7.2/10

Jackson Howard of Pitchfork stated that "A revelation hidden in plain sight, this Memphis rapper’s latest project is more proof that he’s headed for bigger things", criticising the album's lyricism: "He's so brazenly secure in his sound, so convinced of his impending success, that you're left feeling like you have to win him over, and not the other way around."

== Track listing ==
Credits adapted from Tidal.

2 Heartless
No.	Title	Writer(s)	Producer(s)	Length
1.	"Black Heart"	Demario White Jr.; Joshua Luellen	Southside	1:25
2.	"Bigg Facts"	White Jr.; Dylan McKinney	Dmactoobangin	3:00
3.	"Bagg Move" (featuring Quavo)	White Jr.; Quavious Marshall; Eduardo Earle Jr.; Theodore Thomas Jr.	Fuse; Stonii Romo	3:17
4.	"Fed Baby's"	White Jr.; Damion Williams; Jarven Harris	DJ Swift; Track Gordy	3:07
5.	"Still Don't Kno" (featuring Yo Gotti)	White Jr.; Mario Mims; Luellen	Southside	2:54
6.	"Ion Get You"	White Jr.; Javar Rockamore; Earle Jr.; Brytavious Chambers	Rockamore; Tay Keith; Fuse	2:37
7.	"Black Feet" (featuring BlocBoy JB)	White Jr.; James Baker; Rockamore	Rockamore	3:37
8.	"Scars"	White Jr.; Xavier Dotson	Zaytoven	3:03
9.	"Super Fake"	White Jr.; Chambers	Tay Keith	2:12
10.	"Fwm" (featuring Lil Baby)	White Jr.; Dominique Jones; Rockamore	Rockamore	3:08
11.	"Thoughts"	White Jr.; Harris	Track Gordy	2:47
12.	"Ask For"	White Jr.; McKinney	Dmactoobangin	2:48
13.	"Break Da Internet"	White Jr.; Luellen	Southside	2:35
14.	"Moneybagg Myers"	White Jr.; Rockamore	Rockamore	2:27
15.	"Walker Holmes"	White Jr.; Harris	Track Gordy	2:59
16.	"Back Then"	White Jr.; Chambers	Tay Keith	3:05
17.	"Perfect Bitch"	White Jr.; Rockamore; Earle Jr.	Fuse; Rockamore	2:37
18.	"Secrets"	White Jr.; Benjamin Diehl	Ben Billions	3:06
Total length:				50:44

== Personnel ==
Credits adapted from Tidal.

Performers

- Moneybagg Yo – primary artist
- Quavo – featured artist (track 3)
- Yo Gotti – featured artist (track 5)
- BlocBoy JB – featured artist (track 7)
- Lil Baby – featured artist (track 10)

Technical

- Skywalker OG – record engineering (all tracks), mixing engineering (all tracks)
- Leo Goff – mixing (all tracks)
- Tony Wilson – mastering (all tracks)

Production

- Southside – producer (tracks 1, 5, 13)
- Dmactoobangin – producer (tracks 2, 12)
- Fuse – producer (tracks 3, 6, 17)
- Stonii Romo – producer (track 3)
- DJ Swift – producer (track 4)
- Track Gordy – producer (tracks 4, 11, 15)
- Javar Rockamore – producer (tracks 6, 7, 10, 14, 17)
- Tay Keith – producer (tracks 6, 9, 16)
- Zaytoven – producer (track 8)
- Ben Billions – producer (track 18)

== Charts ==
Chart (2018)	Peak position
US Billboard 200	16
US Top R&B/Hip-Hop Albums (Billboard)	9
