= OG Boo Dirty =

American rapper

- Born: Lance Noel Taylor
- Origin: Memphis, Tennessee, U.S.
- Genres: Memphis rap
- Occupation: Rapper
- Years active: 2011–present
- Labels: Konvict Muzik; Mob Muzik Gang; 1017 Records

Lance Noel Taylor, known as OG Boo Dirty, is an American rapper from Memphis, Tennessee.

Taylor was arrested in December 2010 after a brawl in Memphis and charged with attempted second-degree murder, inciting to riot and aggravated riot. In August 2013, he was again arrested and charged with several felonies after police in Memphis found drugs, a loaded handgun and more than US$3,400 in cash in a vehicle containing Taylor and three other men.

== Discography ==
=== Album ===
- Billionaire Dreams (2016)
- Allah (2018)
- The Story of OG (2019)
- Return Of The Gangsta (2019)
- Juiced (2024)
- Underrated (2024)

=== Mixtapes ===
- Almost Famous (2010)
- The Story of OG Hosted By DJ Holiday (2011)
- Born A Soldier, Die A Vet (2012)
- Definition Of A G (2012)
- Definition Of A G 2 (2013)
- Street Certified (2015)
