= Heartless (mixtape) =

Mixtape by Moneybagg Yo
- Released: February 14, 2017
- Genre: Hip hop
- Length: 35:47
- Label: CMG; BGE; N-Less Entertainment
- Producer: JReid; Karltin Bankz; Tay Keith; TK On Da Beat; TM88; Track Gordy; Zaytoven

Moneybagg Yo chronology
2 Federal (2016)	Heartless (2017)	Federal 3X (2017)

Heartless is the eleventh mixtape by American rapper Moneybagg Yo. It was released on February 14, 2017, by Collective Music Group, Bread Gang Entertainment and N-Less Entertainment. The mixtape features two features by Lil Durk and YFN Lucci. It also features production from JReid, Karltin Bankz, Tay Keith, TK On Da Beat, TM88, Track Gordy and Zaytoven.

== Commercial performance ==
Heartless debuted at number 181 on the US Billboard 200.

== Track listing ==
Credits adapted from Tidal.

Heartless
No.	Title	Producer(s)	Length
1.	"No Love"	TK On Da Beat	3:25
2.	"Questions"	TM88	2:59
3.	"Wit This Money" (featuring YFN Lucci)	Track Gordy	3:01
4.	"More"	Tay Keith	2:53
5.	"Don't Kno"	Track Gordy	2:47
6.	"Pride"	Karltin Bankz	2:56
7.	"Nonchalent"	Zaytoven	2:22
8.	"Hurting"	Tay Keith	3:00
9.	"Yesterday" (featuring Lil Durk)	Track Gordy	3:14
10.	"In da Air"	Track Gordy	2:56
11.	"Real Me"	Track Gordy	3:05
12.	"Have U Eva"	JReid	3:09
Total length:			35:47

== Charts ==
Chart (2017)	Peak position
US Billboard 200	181
