= Moneybagg Yo =

American rapper from Tennessee (born 1991)

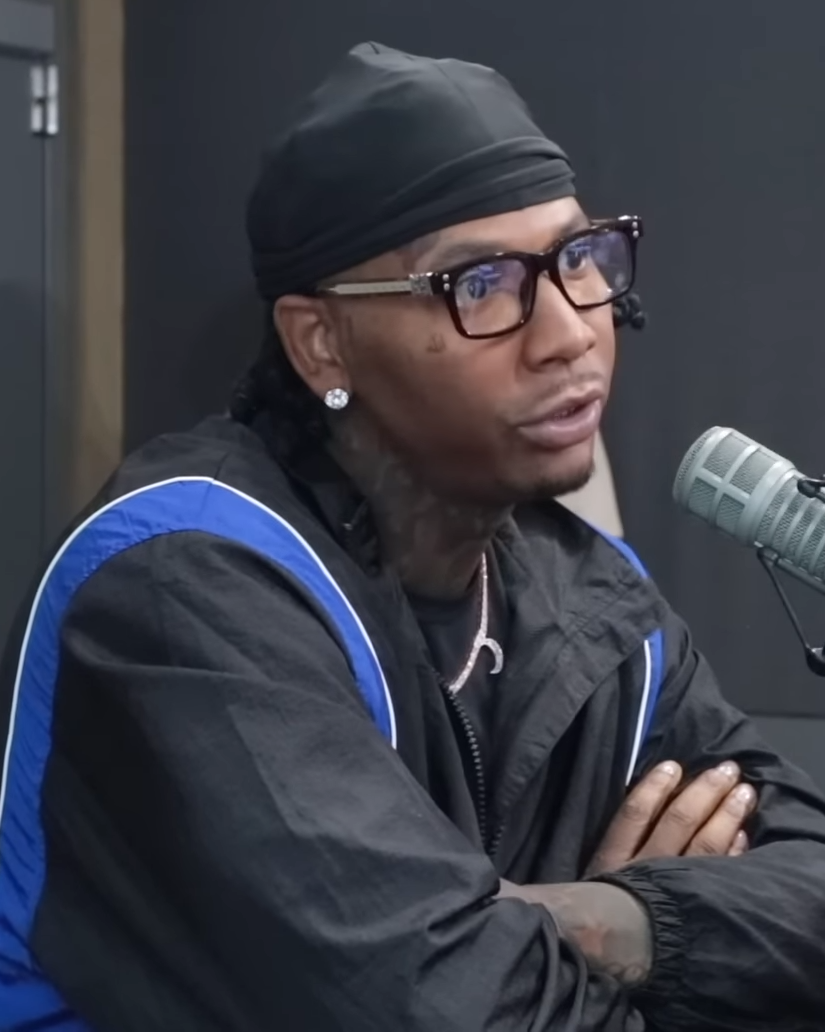
- Moneybagg Yo in 2023

Background information
- Born: DeMario DeWayne White Jr. September 22, 1991 (age 35); Memphis, Tennessee, U.S.
- Genres: Southern hip-hop; trap; Memphis rap
- Occupation: Rapper
- Works: Moneybagg Yo discography
- Years active: 2011–present
- Labels: Roc Nation; Interscope; Collective; Bread Gang; N-Less
- Spouse: Ari Fletcher (m. 2026)
- Children: 8
- Website: baggnation.com

DeMario DeWayne White Jr. (born September 22, 1991), known professionally as Moneybagg Yo, is an American rapper. Based in Memphis, Tennessee, he is noted for his melodic trap and Southern hip-hop style.

White signed with fellow Memphis rapper Yo Gotti's record label, Collective Music Group in 2016, later in a joint venture with Interscope Records. His commercial mixtape, Federal 3X (2017), peaked at numbers five on the Billboard 200, becoming his mainstream breakthrough. His first four studio albums—Reset (2018), 43va Heartless (2019), Time Served (2020), and A Gangsta's Pain (2021)—were each met with critical and commercial success; the latter became his first to debut atop the chart and spawned the Billboard Hot 100-top 20 single "Wockesha."

White is the recipient of multiple accolades, and has received a Grammy Award nomination, in addition to American Music Award, MTV Music Video Award, Hollywood Music in Media Award, and iHeartRadio Music Award nominations; for the latter of which, he received four. He won the 2021 "Trapper of the Year" Award by genre progenitor T.I.

== Early life ==
Moneybagg Yo was born on September 22, 1991, in Memphis, Tennessee, to a single mother. He is the oldest of three siblings and was raised in the West Junction-Walker Homes neighborhood of South Memphis. According to Moneybagg Yo, he had a difficult childhood where his mother served the role of both parents and they often struggled with financial issues, including not having lights, furniture or running water at times. Despite his mother's best efforts to provide for her children and keep them safe, the struggles at home and strict rules she imposed would often lead Moneybagg to run away from home and seek refuge with friends or on the streets from a young age.

White attended Mitchell High School. He later dropped out in the 12th grade, describing himself as "terrible" during that time. Additionally, he explained that he felt that staying in school was not providing him with any financial benefits and saw no future in it. He was motivated by seeing his mother struggle to provide for him and his siblings, and having to sleep in unfurnished apartments.

== Career ==
=== 2011–2013: Early life and career ===
Growing up in South Memphis, Moneybagg had a love for hip-hop music from a young age and was heavily influenced by artists such as Boosie, Yo Gotti, Juvenile, and Future. According to him, he was captivated by everything about their lives and aspirations. "Everything about their life, I just fell in love with," he said in an interview reflecting on his childhood. In an effort to escape the struggles of life in the hood, Moneybagg turned to rapping as a means of making a living. He began his career in 2011 with the release of his first single "F U Pay Me". Over the following years, he released several mixtapes, including From Da Block 2 Da Booth in 2012. In a 2022 interview with the New York Times, Moneybagg spoke about how during the early stages of his career he had to sacrifice important moments in his life and his children's lives such as birthdays, holidays, football games and even simple things like doughnuts with his dad, as he was focused on providing for his children and making a name for himself in the industry.

=== 2016–2018: Release of several mixtapes and Moneybagg's debut studio album, Reset ===
Main articles: 2 Federal, Heartless, Federal 3X, Fed Baby's, 2 Heartless, and Reset.

In 2016, his project Federal Reloaded, a revision of the first installment of the Federal series, featured guest appearances from Y Grizzle, Young Dolph and OG Boo Dirty, among others. The follow-up, ELO (Everybody Lives On), included guest appearances from Yo Gotti and Migos' Quavo, among others. His work with Yo Gotti continued with their joint effort titled 2 Federal, released in October 2016. In February 2017, he released his mixtape Heartless, which peaked at number 177 on the Billboard 200. The mixtape featured guest appearances from YFN Lucci and Lil Durk. In October 2017, Moneybagg released Federal 3X, his debut with Interscope Records. The mixtape contains a sole feature from YoungBoy Never Broke Again. In November of that year, he and YoungBoy released the collaborative mixtape Fed Baby's, which contained his first collaboration with Georgia rapper Future, who was a longtime fan of his music. Regarding this, Moneybagg Yo told the New York Times: "A lot of people were really riding, listening to my music, that you wouldn't expect". In 2018, Moneybagg Yo, his label Bread Gang, and local label N-Less Entertainment released a compilation album: Moneybagg Yo Presents: NLess Ent x Bread Gang on January 1. On February 14, 2018, he released the sequel to his Heartless project with 2 Heartless, which contained guest features from Quavo, Yo Gotti, Lil Baby, and BlocBoy JB and production from Zaytoven and Southside. On July 27, 2018, he released the mixtape Bet On Me, with features from YoungBoy Never Broke Again, Lil Baby, and Gunna with the production handled from Tay Keith, Drum God, and Javar, among others. Moneybagg Yo released his debut studio album Reset in November 2018; it peaked at number 13 on the Billboard 200.

=== 2019–2021: 43va Heartless, Time Served, and A Gangsta's Pain ===
Main articles: 43va Heartless, Time Served, and A Gangsta's Pain.

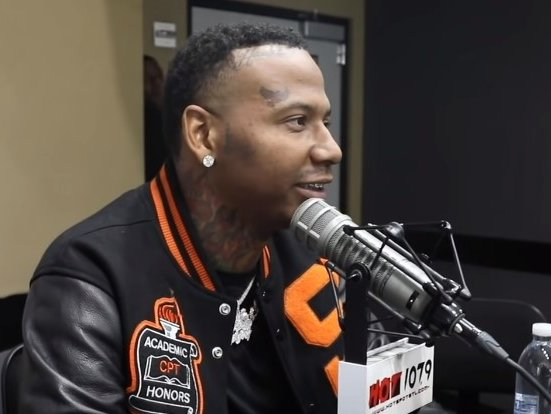
Moneybagg Yo in 2020

To start off 2019, Moneybagg released his second studio album, 43va Heartless, in May 2019. His third studio album, Time Served, was released in January 2020. It includes "All Dat" and "U Played", his first Hot 100-charting singles. The album reached number three on the Billboard 200, with 66,000 units sold during its first week of release. It was followed up by a deluxe edition in May. On June 30, 2020, he released the single "Said Sum", his highest-charting song as a lead artist. After Moneybagg Yo and fellow rapper Blac Youngsta both announced they would be releasing their respective solo albums on a shared day of September 18, 2020, the rappers took this to social media two days before to announce they would instead release a collaborative mixtape titled Code Red. Moneybagg Yo also released a remix of "Said Sum?", featuring American hip-hop group City Girls and American rapper DaBaby, which is included on the mixtape. Moneybagg released his fourth studio album, A Gangsta's Pain, on April 23, 2021. It features guest appearances from Kaash Paige, Big30, Future, Polo G, Lil Durk, Jhené Aiko, and Pharrell Williams. The album became his first number-one project, debuting with 110,000 units on the Billboard 200, and returned to the top in its third week. On June 1, 2021, Moneybagg released the standalone single, "Rookie of the Year", an ode to basketball player Ja Morant.

=== 2022–present: London's Wireless Festival, Hard to Love, and Speak Now ===
In July 2022, Moneybagg performed to tens of thousands of people at London's Wireless Festival, in what was his first international show "Trap taking over the world now," he said when speaking the New York Times, "It ain't limited no more." In June 2023, he released the mixtape Hard to Love, which charted at number ten on the US Billboard 200.

In June 2024, he released his fifth studio album, Speak Now. It features several notable artists, including Chris Brown, Rob49, Lil Durk, YTB Fatt, and Morgan Wallen. He released the album's deluxe edition on September 27, 2024, featuring GloRilla, Big Boogie, and BossMan Dlow. He later teased a follow-up album scheduled for later in 2024, and described it as being for the ladies, as it contains more "melodic vibes".

== Conflicts ==
=== Background ===
Moneybagg Yo has had several legal issues throughout his career. He grew up in the hood closely affiliated with gangs, being the cousin of Three 6 Mafia's Crunchy Black. Growing up, he idolized the "dope boys" and "kingpins" gangs in his neighborhood.

Moneybagg Yo was acquainted with Lance Taylor, also known as OG Boo Dirty, who has a criminal history including an arson charge and two attempted second degree murder charges. In 2010, during Thanksgiving weekend, there was an altercation between rapper Yo Gotti and OG Boo Dirty in the parking lot outside Level II nightclub that left six people shot. According to authorities, Taylor allegedly punched a man who had inserted himself into an ongoing argument between them, which led to shots being fired. Among the six people shot, were OG Boo Dirty and an off-duty police officer who was working as security for the nightclub. OG Boo Dirty and Yo Gotti were both arrested and charged with inciting to riot and aggravated riot. However, the charges were later dropped.

=== Feud with NBA Youngboy and Ralo ===
In 2017, Moneybagg Yo released a joint mixtape with NBA YoungBoy called Fed Baby's, but the two later got into a feud and YoungBoy dissed Moneybagg in a video in which Youngboy can be heard saying, "Fuck that Tape, Bitch I want smoke." Moneybagg tried to keep the peace and eventually the two seemed to have resolved their differences. However, 1017 Label artist Ralo later got involved, dissing Moneybagg as well as labelmate Blac Youngsta who Moneybagg has a tape "Code Red" with.

Ralo claimed that he only wanted Moneybagg's help in connecting him to Blac Youngsta and Yo Gotti to end their own beef. Moneybagg addressed the situation in an interview on The Breakfast Club and tried to stay clear of the drama, focusing on his music and family.

=== Signing with CMG ===
Moneybagg Yo first gained attention in the music industry with the release of his July 2016 mixtape, All Gas No Brakes. Its release caught the attention of CMG label founder Yo Gotti, and he made multiple attempts to sign Moneybagg. After building up a solid trust and rapport with Yo Gotti, Moneybagg ultimately decided to sign on the dotted line with his label. Yo Gotti reportedly brought forth a US$200,000 signing bonus. Both rappers are from different parts of Memphis and there is a longstanding conflict between the North and South sides of the city. Moneybagg Yo is from South Memphis, while Yo Gotti is from the North. Many affiliates of Moneybagg were divided on the decision; some claimed that it was a great move for the rapper's career while others argued it was a betrayal to his roots in South Memphis; there is longstanding conflict between those the two parts which has escalated to dire levels including the loss of life. Supporters of the decision argued it would help him reach a wider audience.

In a Vlad interview, Moneybagg Yo claimed that people were "hating on him for no reason" and that no one had been killed in the Level II Nightclub shooting, so signing to CMG and getting a record deal shouldn't be an issue. However, it was later revealed that someone had indeed been killed with court affidavits suggesting that Lance Taylor was the triggerman, adding credibility to claims made later by Stupid Duke, a rapper affiliated with Yo Gotti, that Moneybagg was working with the "opps," or rivals of Yo Gotti's crew. Memphis rapper OG Boo Dirty, who is also Stupid Duke's blood brother and long-time rival of Yo Gotti, had also released a diss track after the shooting called "Get Em G" directed at Yo Gotti, and in the music video, Moneybagg Yo can allegedly be seen supporting OG Boo Dirty.

=== Feud with Stupid Duke ===
In 2020, Moneybagg Yo was involved in a public feud with rapper Stupid Duke. The origins of the feud can be traced back to around 2010, in which there was an altercation in the parking lot outside the Level II nightclub in Memphis, Tennessee, that left six people shot. Among those accused of being involved in the altercation were Yo Gotti and Lance Taylor, also known as OG Boo Dirty, a rival of Yo Gotti and a member of Moneybagg's former crew "Young Mob" with a criminal history including arson and two attempted second degree murder charges. Court affidavits suggest that Lance Taylor was the triggerman.

=== 2020 party shooting ===
In September 2020, Moneybagg Yo was celebrating his 29th birthday with his crew and girlfriend Ariana Fletcher in Las Vegas, Nevada. During the party, shots rang out and a female, rumored to be a friend of Ariana, was injured. Gunshots were fired outside the location where the group was gathered. The incident was captured on Instagram live, and in the video, voices can be heard saying "They're coming back", before more gunshots are heard. At least one person was reportedly shot and taken to the hospital.

The shooters escaped, and Moneybagg Yo denied that he was the target of the shooting. However, some people have questioned whether he would admit it if he was the target, as this would bring law enforcement attention to him. The incident caused tensions to rise and added to the ongoing feud between Moneybagg Yo and Stupid Duke.

=== Feud with Father ===
The feud with Duke took a turn in June 2021, just 2 months after Dukes release from jail, when someone claiming to be Moneybagg Yo's father accused the rapper of selling out and switching up after achieving fame, and shared receipts of Moneybagg Yo with his former associates. This added to the perception that Moneybagg Yo was following the "paper trail," or prioritizing financial gain, over loyalty to his roots and crew.

According to HD White, after his son Moneybagg Yo's career took off, Moneybagg acted like he didn't know his father anymore. In response, HD White released a rap song in which he takes shots at his son and posted it on Facebook, along with a message taking shots at Moneybagg Yo. The message reads, "Before the money when everything was cool Now he don't know us no More." Moneybagg Yo did not respond to the allegations.

=== Killing of Big Nuskie ===
On January 28, 2022, a shooting occurred at the New Horizon River Apartments in the Whitehaven neighborhood of Memphis, Tennessee. Medics arriving on the scene found a 26-year-old man who had been shot multiple times, and he was pronounced dead immediately. The victim, later identified as Big Nuskie was pronounced dead at the scene by medics. Big Nuskie was an American rapper and member Moneybagg's record label Bread Gang. He was best known for his association with label CEO and fellow rapper Moneybagg Yo. On January 28, 2022, Big Nuskie was shot and killed in his hometown of Memphis, Tennessee. Prior to his death, Big Nuskie had given an interview where he spoke about his childhood in the Whitehaven neighborhood and his time spent in juvenile detention. He had also credited Moneybagg Yo for encouraging him to pursue a career in music.

Following the news of the shooting, Moneybagg Yo tweeted a series of broken heart emojis and posted multiple images in tribute to his fallen associate. Nuskie was also reportedly close with and the cousin of Rapper Big30, who is also signed to Moneybagg Yo. Nuskie was reportedly with Big30 for a show at a local high school before he was killed later that evening. Big30, who is also signed to Bread Gang, posted a tribute to the rapper on his Instagram account, expressing his grief and mourning the loss of his cousin and role model. There have been speculations that the murder of Big Nuskie is connected to the murder of Young Dolph or Moneybagg's feud with Stupid Duke. Many people believe that Nuski's affiliation with Moneybagg Yo and his label Bread Gang may have played a role in his murder, possibly as a result of this ongoing feud. There is no concrete evidence to support these speculations as the police have not yet released any information regarding the possible motives or suspects in the case. In a 2022 interview with the New York Times, Moneybagg Yo spoke of how he planned to name a plot of land he bought after Nuskie.

== Personal life ==
Moneybagg Yo has eight children. He is known for his lavish spending, frequently gifting his children high-end jewelry and other luxury items; the family also employs a personal chef. Moneybagg has become one of the most prominent rappers to emerge from Memphis in a generation, commanding fees as high as $150,000 per concert. (Note: The amount varies depending on the venue and location.) His rising profile and involvement in several public feuds with other artists have made personal security a constant concern; during a day spent with ‘‘New York Times’’ journalist Jon Caramanica, Moneybagg was accompanied by two security guards with military training, even while in his hometown.

In February 2022, it was reported that Moneybagg Yo was allegedly relocating outside of his hometown of Memphis. The news came after the death of his friend Nuskie. The passing of Nuskie is thought to have had a significant impact on Moneybagg Yo, leading him to make the decision to relocate. In a 2022 interview with the New York Times, he confirmed that he had relocated to Atlanta, GA to maintain a sense of peace and focus on the family he has with the mother of his children.

Even though Moneybagg now primarily lives in Atlanta, he has stayed connected to his roots in South Memphis and has been actively investing in local businesses such as an alkaline water called Vior. He has also bought a large plot of land in the area in which he plans to name after his late friend, Nuskie, and develop into a community center, dirt bike paths, and paintball course. "This for my neighborhood," he said.

DeMario is known for his love of cannabis. He has publicly spoken about his consumption of marijuana since he was a teenager, and has stated that he uses it as a way to relax and create while recording music. He has also spoken about the importance of discipline when consuming cannabis, and how he chooses not to smoke before performances or interviews in order to stay focused.

=== Relationships ===
In 2019, rumors circulated that Megan Thee Stallion and Moneybagg Yo were dating after collaborating on music. In a January 2020 interview, Moneybagg Yo confirmed that the two had a relationship but that they eventually broke up. However, fans speculated that Megan Thee Stallion had dissed Moneybagg Yo in her 2020 single "B.I.T.C.H.", with lyrics that seemed to reference cheating rumors. After his short dating experience with Megan Thee Stallion, it was evident that he'd been back in union with Alexisua Richardson, who is known as "The Real Poison Ivy" and the mother of his children.

The year 2023 led to another reuniting and breakup between Moneybagg Yo and Juicy, and again during June 2023, Moneybagg Yo released a single about his infidelity to Poison Ivy titled "F My BM." Despite this, the two have partnered on a restaurant together in April 2023.

Moneybagg Yo has been in an on and off relationship with influencer Ari Fletcher since 2019.

=== Religion ===
In 2018, Moneybagg Yo converted to Islam, taking his Shahada from rapper Kevin Gates. He prays and observes fasts during Ramadan. Moneybagg Yo described Islam as what made him quit drinking lean, stating in an interview that, "I'm Muslim so I'm disciplined... I'm strong-minded."

== Discography ==
Studio albums

- Reset (2018)
- 43va Heartless (2019)
- Time Served (2020)
- A Gangsta's Pain (2021)
- Speak Now (2024)
