= BlocBoy JB discography =

Memphis rap recording artist discography

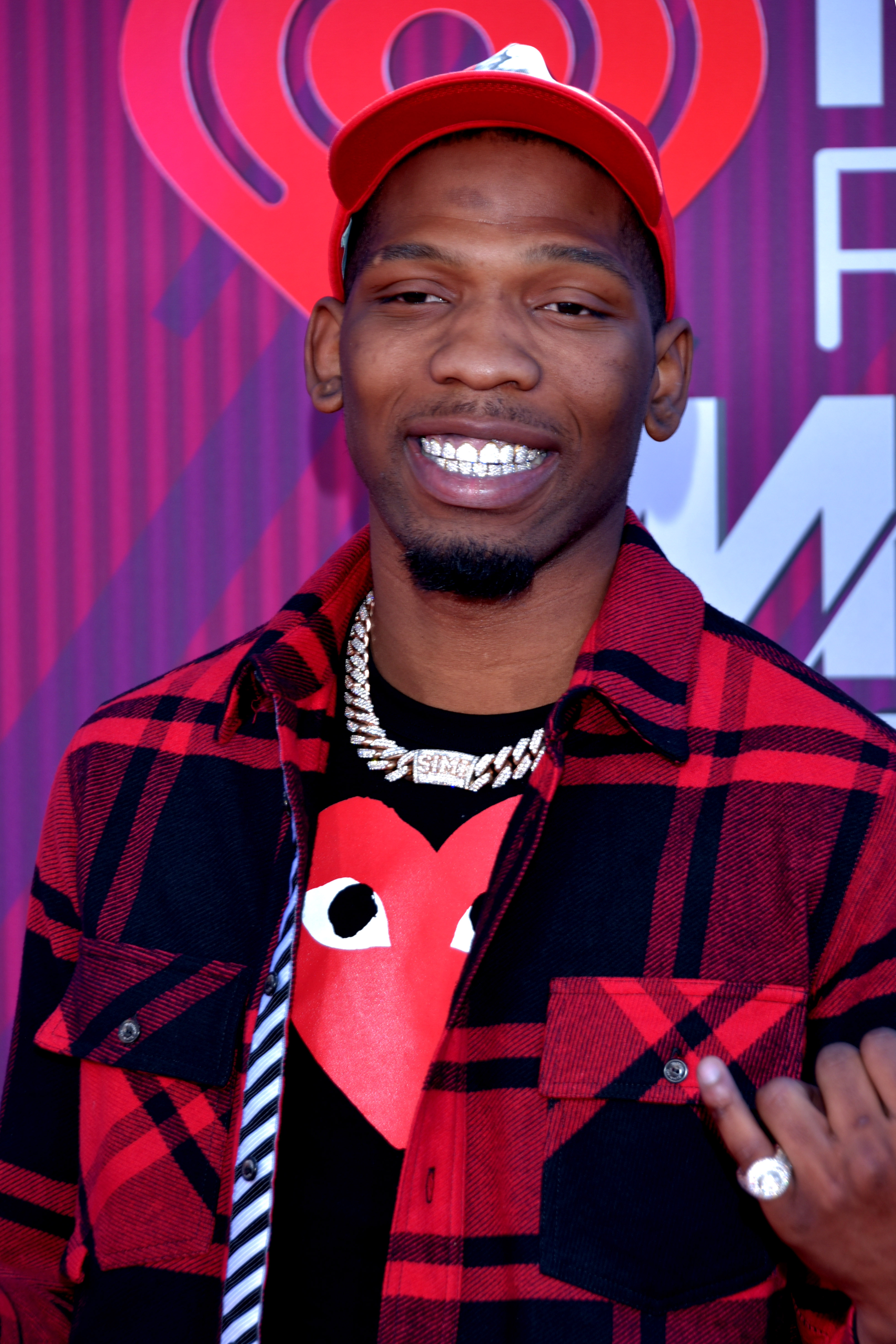
- JB at the 2019 iHeartRadio Music Awards in Los Angeles, California
- Studio albums: 1
- EPs: 1
- Singles: 30
- Mixtapes: 13

The discography of American rapper BlocBoy JB includes one studio albums, 13 mixtapes, one EP, 38 singles (including 7 as a featured artist, and 1 promotional single), and numerous music videos.

== Studio albums ==
List of studio albums, with selected details
Title	Album details
FatBoy	Released: October 9, 2020; Label: Interscope, Foundation, Bloc Nation; Format: Digital download, streaming

== Compilation albums ==
Title	Details	Peak chart positions
Title	Details	US
Gangsta Art (with CMG the Label)	Released: July 15, 2022; Label: CMG, Interscope; Format: Digital download, streaming	11

== Mixtapes ==
List of mixtapes, with selected details
Title	Mixtape details	Peak chart positions			
Title	Mixtape details	US	US R&B/HH	US Rap	CAN
Who Am I	Released: June 10, 2016; Label: Self-released; Format: Digital download	—	—	—	—
Grape Juice	Released: September 23, 2016; Label: Self-released; Format: Digital download	—	—	—	—
Who Am I 2	Released: December 28, 2016; Label: Self-released; Format: Digital download	—	—	—	—
Loco	Released: March 12, 2017; Label: Self-released; Format: Digital download	—	—	—	—
Who Am I 3	Released: June 30, 2017; Label: Bloc Nation; Format: Digital download	—	—	—	—
The Purple M&M	Released: September 11, 2017; Label: Bloc Nation; Format: Digital download	—	—	—	—
A Few Grapes	Released March 23, 2018; Label: Self-released; Format: Digital download	—	—	—	—
Simi	Released: May 4, 2018; Label: Bloc Nation; Format: Digital download	28	16	13	35
Empire Bloc (with Empire Dott)	Released: October 12, 2018; Label: Self-released; Format: Digital download	—	—	—	—
I Am Me	Released: June 14, 2019; Label: Bloc Nation, Collective Music Group; Format: Digital download	196	173	150	—
Bacc 2 da Bloc	Released: January 26, 2022; Label: Interscope, Foundation, Bloc Nation; Format: Digital download, streaming	—	—	—	—
The Purple M&M 2	Released: February 21, 2025; Label: Self-released; Format: Digital download, streaming	—	—	—	—
T.B.C	Released: November 28, 2025; Label: Self-released; Format: Digital download, streaming	—	—	—	—

== Deluxe mixtapes ==
List of studio albums, with selected details
Title	Album details
T.B.C (Reloaded)	Released: February 6, 2026; Label: Self-released; Format: Digital download, streaming

== Extended plays ==
Title	EP details
Don't Think That	Released: October 30, 2018; Label: Interscope, Bloc Nation; Format: Digital download

== Singles ==
=== As lead artist ===
Title	Year	Peak chart positions								Certifications	Album
Title	Year	US	US R&B/HH	US Rap	US R&B/HH Air.	AUS	CAN	NZ	UK	Certifications	Album
"First Day Bacc on Da Bloc"	2017	—	—	—	—	—	—	—	—		Who Am I 3
"Shoot"	2017	— (Note: "Shoot" did not enter the Billboard Hot 100, but peaked at number 18 on the Bubbling Under Hot 100 Singles chart.)	—	—	18	—	—	—	—		Who Am I 3
"Rover" (solo or remix featuring 21 Savage)	2018	— (Note: "Rover 2.0" did not enter the Billboard Hot 100, but peaked at number two on the Bubbling Under Hot 100 Singles chart.)	49	—	39	—	—	—	—		Simi
"Look Alive" (featuring Drake)	2018	5	3	2	1	24	4	15	17	ARIA: Platinum; BPI: Platinum; IFPI SWI: Gold; RIAA: 5× Platinum; RMNZ: Gold	Simi
"Prod by Bloc"	2018	—	—	—	—	—	—	—	—		Non-album single
"Let It Go" (with 88rising and Higher Brothers)	2018	—	—	—	—	—	—	—	—		Head in the Clouds
"Peach Jam" (with 88rising and Joji)	2018	—	—	—	—	—	—	— (Note: "Peach Jam" did not enter the NZ Top 40 Singles Chart, but peaked at number 30 on the NZ Hot Singles Chart.)	—		Head in the Clouds
"Yoppa" (with Lil Mosey)	2018	—	—	—	—	—	—	—	—		Northsbest
"Don't Say That" (featuring Lil Uzi Vert)	2018	—	—	—	—	—	—	—	—		Don't Think That
"Club Roc"	2018	—	—	—	—	—	—	—	—		Don't Think That
"ChopBloc" (with NLE Choppa)	2019	—	—	—	—	—	—	—	—		Non-album single
"House Party"	2019	—	—	—	—	—	—	—	—		I Am Me
"Mercedes"	2019	—	—	—	—	—	—	—	—		I Am Me
"ChopBloc 2" (with NLE Choppa)	2019	—	—	—	—	—	—	—	—		Non-album single
"Swervin"	2020	—	—	—	—	—	—	—	—		FatBoy
"No Chorus, Pt. 12" (featuring Tay Keith)	2020	—	—	—	—	—	—	—	—		FatBoy
"Do What I Do"	2020	—	—	—	—	—	—	—	—		Non-album single
"Count Up"	2020	—	—	—	—	—	—	—	—		FatBoy
"ChopBloc, Pt. 3" (with NLE Choppa)	2020	—	—	—	—	—	—	—	—		FatBoy
"Day Day N Craig" (with Tay Keith)	2021	—	—	—	—	—	—	—	—		Bacc 2 Da Bloc
"M.E.M 2 Jacksonville" (featuring SpotemGottem)	2021	—	—	—	—	—	—	—	—		Bacc 2 Da Bloc
"Home Alone"	2022	—	—	—	—	—	—	—	—		Bacc 2 Da Bloc
"Ok" (with Lil Migo and CMG the Label)	2022	—	—	—	—	—	—	—	—		
"Foreign on Foreign" (with Lil Migo and FastCash CMoney)	2023	—	—	—	—	—	—	—	—		Gangsta Art
"Pro-duced By Bloc Pt. 2"	2024	—	—	—	—	—	—	—	—		Non-album single
"Slow It Up"	2025	—	—	—	—	—	—	—	—		The Purple M&M 2
"Say That Shit" (featuring K Carbon)	2025	—	—	—	—	—	—	—	—		The Purple M&M 2
"Can't Be Like Me"	2025	—	—	—	—	—	—	—	—		T.B.C
"Free Blood"	2025	—	—	—	—	—	—	—	—		T.B.C
"Murda Man"	2026	—	—	—	—	—	—	—	—		T.B.C. (Reloaded)
"—" denotes a recording that did not chart or was not released in that territory.

=== As featured artist ===
List of singles as a featured artist, with selected chart positions, showing year released and album name
Title	Year	Peak chart positions					Certifications	Album
Title	Year	US Bub.	US R&B /HH	US Dance	US R&B/HH Dig. Sales	CAN	Certifications	Album
"Hard" (No Jumper featuring Tay-K and BlocBoy JB)	2018	14	— (Note: "Hard" did not enter the Hot R&B/Hip-Hop Songs chart, but peaked at number four on the Bubbling Under R&B/Hip-Hop Singles chart.)	—	—	—		Non-album singles
"Bad Company" (ASAP Rocky featuring BlocBoy JB)	2018	1	47	—	—	68	RIAA: Gold	Non-album singles
"Slow Dance" (Brianna Perry featuring BlocBoy JB)	2018	—	—	—	—	—		Non-album singles
"Drop" (G-Eazy featuring Blac Youngsta and BlocBoy JB)	2018	—	—	—	21	—		Non-album singles
"We Bangin' Grape" (Lil One Hunnet featuring BlocBoy JB and 03 Greedo)	2018	—	—	—	—	—		Non-album singles
"Better" (Chantel Jeffries featuring BlocBoy JB and Vory)	2018	—	—	32	—	—		Non-album singles
"Camelot (Remix)" (NLE Choppa featuring Yo Gotti, Moneybagg Yo, and BlocBoy JB)	2019	—	—	—	—	—		Non-album singles
"—" denotes a recording that did not chart or was not released in that territory.

=== Promotional singles ===
Title	Year	Album
"Nun of Dat" (featuring Lil Pump)	2018	Simi

== Guest appearances ==
List of non-single guest appearances, with other performing artists, showing year released and album name
Title	Year	Other artist(s)	Album
"Black Feet"	2018	Moneybagg Yo	2 Heartless
"This is America"	2018	Childish Gambino, Young Thug, Slim Jxmmi, 21 Savage, Quavo	Non-album single
"In The Air"	2018	Rico Nasty	Nasty
"OG Beeper"	2018	ASAP Rocky	Testing
"Who Want the Smoke?"	2018	Lil Yachty, Cardi B, Offset	Nuthin' 2 Prove
"Where I'm From"	2019	Quando Rondo, Polo G	From the Neighborhood to the Stage

== Music videos ==
=== As lead artist ===
Title	Year	Director(s)
"Passport"	2016	Skrilla
"No Chorus Pt. 6"	2016	TBO Films
"First Day Bacc on Da Bloc"	2017	Yoo Ali
"Shoot"	2017	Yoo Ali
"Who Da Greatest"	2017	Yoo Ali
"Rock With Me" (with Empire Dott)	2017	Yoo Ali
"No Chorus Pt. 10"	2017	Yoo Ali
"Beast Mode"	2017	Yoo Ali
"Bbq"	2017	Yoo Ali
"Soulja"	2017	Yoo Ali
"No Topic"	2017	Yoo Ali
"Gang Shit" (featuring Boonk Gang)	2018	Yoo Ali
"Half Man, Half Amazing"	2018	Yoo Ali
"Look Alive" (featuring Drake)	2018	Yoo Ali
"Rover 2.0" (featuring 21 Savage)	2018	Yoo Ali
"Prod by Bloc"	2018	Yoo Ali
"No Chorus, Pt. 11"	2018	Yoo Ali
"Mamacita"	2018	Icy House Studios
"Woah"	2018	Yoo Ali
"Let It Go" (with Higher Brothers)	2018	Unknown
"Peach Jam" (with Joji)	2018	Christine Yuan
"Club Roc"	2018	Unknown
"Licks"	2018	Zach Hurth
"Rich Hoes" (featuring HoodRich Pablo Juan)	2018	Yoo Ali
"Sticcs"	2018	Zach Hurth
"Mini Van" (with DaBaby)	2019	Reel Goats
"Yoppa" (with Lil Mosey)	2019	RaheemisBlind
"ChopBloc" (with NLE Choppa)	2019	Zach Hurth
"Clap Out"	2019	Zach Hurth
"No Adlibs"	2019	Zach Hurth
"Juice"	2019	Zach Hurth
"House Party"	2019	Zach Hurth & Mota Media
"I Used To"	2019	Zach Hurth
"Don't Be Mad"	2019	300 Visions
"Holy Moly"	2019	Zach Hurth
"Ric Flair"	2019	Zach Hurth
"Mercedes"	2019	Hidji World
"Copy"	2019	Zach Hurth
"TracBoy"	2019	JuddyRemixDem
"It's Bloc"	2019	LewisYouNasty
"ChopBloc 2" (with NLE Choppa)	2019	JuddyRemixDem
"Jail Calls"	2019	LvtrKevin
"Str8 In"	2019	LewisYouNasty
"Trap Neva Closed" (with HoodRich Pablo Juan and Sada Baby)	2019	JuddyRemixDem
"Still Crippin"	2020	Zach Hurth & Mota Media
"Silly Watch Freestyle"	2020	Zach Hurth & Mota Media
"Swervin"	2020	Zach Hurth
"Out West Freestyle"	2020	Yoo Ali
"Gone Hate" (with Munchie2Times)	2020	Yoo Ali

=== As featured artist ===
Title	Year	Director(s)
"Tick" (Baby Los featuring BlocBoy JB)	2018	Wikid Films
"Hard" (No Jumper featuring Tay-K and BlocBoy JB)	2018	Nicholas Jandora
"No Stylist" (Dave East featuring BlocBoy JB)	2018	White Billionz
"Drop" (G-Eazy featuring Blac Youngsta and BlocBoy JB)	2018	Edgar Esteves
