= G Walk =

2019 single by Lil Mosey featuring Chris Brown

Single by Lil Mosey featuring Chris Brown

from the album Certified Hitmaker
- Released: June 7, 2019
- Genre: Hip hop; trap
- Length: 2:21
- Label: Mogul Vision; Interscope
- Songwriters: Lathan Echols; Chris Brown; Royce Pearson
- Producer: Royce David

Lil Mosey singles chronology
"Bust Down Cartier" (2019)	"G Walk" (2019)	"Stuck in a Dream" (2019)

Chris Brown singles chronology
"Haute" (2019)	"G Walk" (2019)	"No Guidance" (2019)

Audio video
- "G Walk" on YouTube

"G Walk" is a song by American rapper Lil Mosey. It was released on June 7, 2019, as the first single from his second studio album Certified Hitmaker. The song features vocals from American singer Chris Brown and production from Royce David.

== Background ==
"G Walk" marks the first collaboration between Mosey and Brown, and comes after Mosey sampled Brown’s 2005 single “Yo (Excuse Me Miss)” for his 2018 track “Greet Her”.

== Composition ==
“G Walk” is a hip hop and trap track. Mosey delivers melodic verses in a low baritone. Vivid synths, speedy hi-hats and lush piano chords make up the instrumentals, building up the song to Chris Brown’s entrance at the middle. Rhymes like “Hop in the coupe goin’ crazy” and “She see me whip a Mercedes” make up the hook, while Brown's feature completes the track by ending his latter half in high-scaled R&B vocals.

== Critical reception ==
Rap Up praised Brown's "smooth harmonies" and Mosey's "sing-song delivery to the braggadocious banger". HotNewHipHop commented that "With a piano-driven beat and another catchy flow, Lil Mosey starts off the affair with a hook and the first verse. Midway through, Chris Brown can't contain himself as he jumps in for ad-lib duty before dropping his own verse. In his signature way, Breezy flawlessly flexes his vocals in a sing-rap sort of way, complementing Mosey's style and issuing him an important co-sign this early in his career."

== Charts ==
Chart (2019)	Peak position
New Zealand Hot Singles (RMNZ)	24

== Certifications ==
Region	Certification	Certified units/sales
United States (RIAA)	Gold	500,000^{‡}
^{‡} Sales+streaming figures based on certification alone.
