= Slow It Up =

Slow It Up may refer to:

- "Slow It Up", 2025 song by BlocBoy JB
- "Slow It Up", 2005 song by Terri Walker from L.O.V.E
- "Slow It Up", 2005 song by Unk from Beat'n Down Yo Block!
