= Flu Game (song) =

Single by Lil Mosey
- Released: March 17, 2023
- Genre: Hip hop; trap
- Length: 2:14
- Label: Mogul Vision; Interscope
- Songwriters: Lathan Echols; Joseph Boyden; Georgia Rose Boyden; Ishmael Montague
- Producer: Royce David

Lil Mosey singles chronology
| "Breathin Again" (2022) | "Flu Game" (2023) | "One Too Many" (2024) |

Music video
- "Flu Game" on YouTube

"Flu Game" is a song recorded by American rapper Lil Mosey, released as a single on March 17, 2023. The song was produced by Royce David, who has also produced most of his other songs. This is his only single from 2023.

== Composition ==
The song serves as Lil Mosey's first single of 2023 and Mosey said that he named the song "Flu Game" because of American former basketball player Michael Jordan when in 1997, Jordan had a remarkable performance in Game 5 of the 1997 NBA Finals, but he suffered flu-like symptoms while playing. In the song, it starts out with the first verse, where Mosey mentions one of his close friends taking drugs like percocet, which made his friend tired. Also in the first verse, Mosey references his financial success with phrases like "Helicopter Money", and being called "flyer" while indicating that he is focusing on his career and aspirations. In the second verse, Mosey acknowledges the presence of people who enjoy seeing others fail, but he remains resilient vowing not to go back to previous struggles and he also tries maintaining his strength in the face of adversity.

== Music video ==
The official music video was uploaded to Lil Mosey's Vevo channel on YouTube on March 17, 2023, the same day as the song itself. The music video was directed by Yungtada. In the music video, it sees Mosey riding in a car and short video clips of him in a basketball court that is very dim lit, later in the music video we see Mosey in a small room with multiple rewards on the room's walls.
