= Yoppa =

Yoppa may refer to:

- "Yoppa", a 2018 song by Lil Mosey featuring BlocBoy JB from Northsbest
- "Yoppa", a 2018 song by Chris Brown from the Cuffing Season edition of Heartbreak on a Full Moon
- Yoppa, a character from Matchless Raijin-Oh
- Yoppa, a League of Legends Professional Player for Schalke 04 Evolution
