= Stuck in a Dream =

2019 single by Lil Mosey featuring Gunna

Single by Lil Mosey featuring Gunna

from the album Certified Hitmaker
- Released: September 17, 2019
- Genre: Hip hop; trap
- Length: 2:03
- Label: Mogul Vision; Interscope
- Songwriters: Lathan Echols; Sergio Kitchens; Royce Pearson
- Producer: Royce David

Lil Mosey singles chronology
"G Walk" (2019)	"Stuck in a Dream" (2019)	"Live This Wild" (2019)

Gunna singles chronology
"Suicide Doors" (2019)	"Stuck in a Dream" (2019)	"I Wanna Rock" (2019)

Music video
- "Stuck In A Dream" on YouTube

"Stuck in a Dream" is a song by American rapper Lil Mosey featuring fellow American rapper Gunna. Written alongside producer Royce David. it was released on September 17, 2019, as the second single from the former's second studio album Certified Hitmaker. The single peaked at number 62 on the US Billboard Hot 100, becoming Mosey's highest-charting single until it was surpassed by "Blueberry Faygo". It has gone on to become one of Mosey's most popular songs, as well as his third most streamed song on Spotify, behind "Noticed" and "Blueberry Faygo".

== Background and composition ==
The song was originally written in 2018 and leaked on August 26, 2019, with no guest appearances. The lyrics of the song address the lifestyles of Lil Mosey and Gunna. The former talks about his drug usage, which he later addressed in an interview with Genius. According to Mosey, the song is also about him living in his dream of his career.

== Music video ==
The music video was released along with the single on September 17, 2019. Directed by Michael Garcia, the video shows Lil Mosey and Gunna in a neon-lit dream world, and takes place in a location called the "Pink Motel". The rappers show off their money and "iced out" jewelry with women surrounding them.

== Charts ==
Chart (2019)	Peak position
Australia (ARIA)	92
Canada (Canadian Hot 100)	34
Ireland (IRMA)	82
New Zealand Hot Singles (RMNZ)	27
Portugal (AFP)	93
Sweden Heatseeker (Sverigetopplistan)	6
UK Singles (OCC)	83
US Billboard Hot 100 (Billboard)	62
US Hot R&B/Hip-Hop Songs (Billboard)	30
US Rolling Stone Top 100	34

== Certifications ==
Region	Certification	Certified units/sales
Brazil (Pro-Música Brasil)	Gold	20,000^{‡}
New Zealand (RMNZ)	Gold	15,000^{‡}
Portugal (AFP)	Gold	5,000^{‡}
United Kingdom (BPI)	Silver	200,000^{‡}
United States (RIAA)	2× Platinum	2,000,000^{‡}
^{‡} Sales+streaming figures based on certification alone.

== See also ==
Gunna discography

Lil Mosey discography
