= Trapstar =

Trapstar might refer to one of the following:

- "Trapstar", a song on Nivea's album Animalistic
- "Trapstar", a song on Lil Mosey's album Northsbest
- "Trap Star", a song on Young Jeezy's album Let's Get It: Thug Motivation 101
- "Trapstar", a British clothing brand, by a private company Trapstar London.
