= Don't Say That =

Single by BlocBoy JB featuring Lil Uzi Vert

from the album Don't Think That
- Released: October 30, 2018
- Length: 2:45
- Label: Interscope; Bloc Nation
- Songwriters: James Lee Baker; Symere Woods; Saheed Ibitoye
- Producer: Babyxwater

BlocBoy JB singles chronology
"Yoppa" (2018)	"Don't Say That" (2018)	"Club Roc" (2018)

"Don't Say That" is a song by American rapper BlocBoy JB featuring Lil Uzi Vert. It was released on October 30, 2018, as the lead single from BlocBoy's debut extended play Don't Think That.

== Background ==
The song was first teased on June 25, 2018, with a video of BlocBoy JB and Lil Uzi Vert dancing. Michael Saponara of Billboard called the video "hilarious". The song was later released on October 30, 2018, along with BlocBoy's debut EP, Don't Think That.

== Composition ==
The track runs at 2 minutes and 45 seconds long and features a chorus and verse from BlocBoy JB, and a verse from Lil Uzi Vert. The song contains a sample from PRXJEK's October 2017 track "Devil Speaks", which is a popular sample in hip-hop music.

== Critical reception ==
Alex Zidel of HotNewHipHop called the track "spooky", and said that the song "will undoubtedly get the most attention due to name power alone". Trace William Cowen of Complex called the track a "banger".
