= Certified Hitmaker =

Studio album by Lil Mosey
- Released: November 8, 2019
- Recorded: 2018–2019
- Genre: Hip hop; trap; pop rap
- Length: 38:03
- Label: Mogul Vision; Interscope
- Producer: Callan; Cubeatz; Dez Wright; ForeignGotEm; Kid Culture; Rio Leyva; Royce David; Waves; Quin Kiu

Lil Mosey chronology
Lil Mosey (2019)	Certified Hitmaker (2019)	UNI (2022)

Singles from Certified Hitmaker
- 1. "G Walk" Released: June 7, 2019; 2. "Stuck in a Dream" Released: September 17, 2019; 3. "Live This Wild" Released: November 5, 2019; 4. "Blueberry Faygo" Released: February 7, 2020; 5. "Back at It" Released: June 26, 2020; 6. "Top Gone" Released: August 5, 2020

Certified Hitmaker is the second studio album by American rapper Lil Mosey. It was released on November 8, 2019, by Mogul Vision Music and Interscope Records. This serves at the follow-up to his 2018 release Northsbest. The album contains features from Chris Brown, Gunna, Trippie Redd and AJ Tracey. Every song on its standard edition was produced by Royce David, who also produced the majority of songs on Northsbest. It was reissued on February 7, 2020, coinciding with the release of Mosey's hit single "Blueberry Faygo". A deluxe edition, marketed as Certified Hitmaker (AVA Leak), was released on August 14, 2020, and includes additional features from Lil Baby and Lunay.

Certified Hitmaker was supported by three singles: "G Walk", "Stuck in a Dream" and "Live This Wild", as well as two additional singles: "Back At It" and "Top Gone", in the lead up to the release of its deluxe. Certified Hitmaker debuted at number 12 on the US Billboard 200, earning 23,000 album-equivalent units in its first week.

== Background ==
A deluxe edition, marketed as Certified Hitmaker (AVA Leak), was released on August 14, 2020. It was supported by two singles: "Back at It" and "Top Gone". Three new songs were also added to the tracklist, "Bands Out Tha Roof", "My Dues", and "Focus on Me".

== Singles ==
Certified Hitmaker was supported by a total of six singles. The first single, "G Walk" was released on June 7, 2019. The song features a guest appearance from Chris Brown. While the high-profile collaboration was initially unexpected, Mosey had notably sampled Brown's 2005 hit single "Yo (Excuse Me Miss)" in "Greet Her", the seventh song on Northsbest. The second single, "Stuck in a Dream" featuring Gunna was released on September 17, 2019. The music video was also released on Lil Mosey's YouTube channel the same day. The single peaked at number 62 on the US Billboard Hot 100 dated November 23, 2019, as well as number 34 on the Canadian Hot 100 chart. The third single, "Live This Wild" was released on November 5, 2019, a few days before the release of Certified Hitmaker. Its music video was released a week later on November 14, 2019. Although it failed to chart on the US Billboard Hot 100, it managed to peak at number 80 on the Canadian Hot 100. The fourth single, "Blueberry Faygo" was originally an unreleased song that was leaked online. It was being uploaded on to Spotify and other platforms under many different names. For a period of time the song kept being posted and taken down. Eventually, the song became one of the biggest trending songs on Spotify. The song was officially released on February 7, 2020, and was later included on the album's reissue on the same day. The music video was released on March 26, 2020, and was directed by Cole Bennett. The single became Lil Mosey's most successful song to date, peaking at number 8 on the US Billboard Hot 100. In Canada, the song peaked at number 8 on the Canadian Hot 100. It also managed to peaked at number 9 on the UK Singles Chart and number 62 on Billboard's Global 200 charts respectively. The fifth single, "Back At It" featuring Lil Baby was released on June 26, 2020, in the lead up to the album's deluxe. The song reached number 9 on the US Bubbling Under the Hot 100 chart. The final single, "Top Gone" featuring Lunay was released on August 5, 2020.

Certified Hitmaker debuted at number 12 on the US Billboard 200 chart, earning 23,000 album-equivalent units in its first week. This became Lil Mosey's highest-charting album to date. The album also debuted at number 9 on the US Top R&B/Hip-Hop Albums chart. It ranked number 72 on the Billboard 200 year-end chart of 2020.

== Track listing ==
Certified Hitmaker track listing
No.	Title	Writer(s)	Producer(s)	Length
1.	"So Fast"	Lathan Echols; Elgin Lumpkin; Troy Oliver; Royce Pearson	Royce David	2:40
2.	"Live This Wild"	Echols; Pearson; Rio Leyva; Vid Vucenovic	Royce David; Leyva; ForeignGotEm	2:03
3.	"Speed Racin"	Echols; Pearson	Royce David	2:43
4.	"Rockstars"	Echols; Pearson; Abdirahman Osman; Quinton Sung	Royce David; Waves; Quin Kiu	1:54
5.	"Stuck in a Dream" (featuring Gunna)	Echols; Sergio Kitchens; Pearson	Royce David	2:04
6.	"Rose Gold"	Echols; Pearson; Dylan Cleary-Krell	Royce David; Dez Wright	2:39
7.	"Dreamin"	Echols; Pearson; DeAndre Way; Brandon Green	Royce David	2:58
8.	"Bankroll" (featuring AJ Tracey)	Echols; Ché Grant; Pearson	Royce David	2:45
9.	"See My Baby"	Echols; Pearson; Daniel Hackett	Royce David; Kid Culture	2:34
10.	"Jet to the West"	Echols; Pearson; Vucenovic	Royce David; ForeignGotEm	2:21
11.	"Space Coupe"	Echols; Pearson; Kevin Gomringer; Tim Gomringer	Royce David; Cubeatz	2:18
12.	"G Walk" (with Chris Brown)	Echols; Christopher Brown; Pearson	Royce David	2:21
13.	"Never Scared" (featuring Trippie Redd)	Echols; Michael White IV; Pearson	Royce David	3:03
14.	"Kari's World"	Echols; Pearson; Vucenovic	Royce David; ForeignGotEm	2:57
Total length:				35:20

Certified Hitmaker (AVA Leak) deluxe edition
No.	Title	Writer(s)	Producer(s)	Length
1.	"Blueberry Faygo"	Echols; Johnny Gill, Jr.; Daryl Simmons; Antonio Reid; Kenneth Edmonds; Callan Wong	Callan	2:43
2.	"Top Gone" (with Lunay)	Echols; Jefnier Moreno; Sean Kingston; Donald Flores; Benjamin Lasnier; Patrick Piscot	Lasnier; Piscot	3:14
3.	"Back at It" (featuring Lil Baby)	Echols; Dominique Jones; Diego Avendano; Taylor Banks; Joel Banks; Xavier Thompson; Germán Valdés	Diego Ave; Bankroll Got It	2:36
4.	"Bands out tha Roof"	Echols; Pearson; Sean Momberger	Royce David; Momberger	2:41
5.	"My Dues"	Echols; Pearson; Marcos dos Santos Cardoso	Royce David; Ace Bankz	2:28
6.	"Focus on Me"	Echols	Lil Mosey	2:32
Total length:				51:37

== Personnel ==
- Lil Mosey – primary artist
- Mike Tucci – mastering engineer
- Patrizio Pigliapoco – mixer
- Michael Garcia – music video director
- Patrizio Pigliapoco and Royce David – recording engineers
- Royce David – studio personnel

== Charts ==
=== Weekly charts ===
Weekly chart performance for Certified Hitmaker
Chart (2019–2020)	Peak position
Australian Albums (ARIA)	91
Belgian Albums (Ultratop Flanders)	130
Canadian Albums (Billboard)	8
Dutch Albums (Album Top 100)	32
Finnish Albums (Suomen virallinen lista)	47
French Albums (SNEP)	184
Irish Albums (IRMA)	92
Latvian Albums (LaIPA)	26
Lithuanian Albums (AGATA)	36
Norwegian Albums (VG-lista)	15
Swedish Albums (Sverigetopplistan)	45
UK Albums (OCC)	67
US Billboard 200	12
US Top R&B/Hip-Hop Albums (Billboard)	9

=== Year-end charts ===
Year-end chart performance for Certified Hitmaker
Chart (2020)	Position
Canadian Albums (Billboard)	41
US Billboard 200	72
US Top R&B/Hip-Hop Albums (Billboard)	42

== Certifications ==
Certifications for Certified Hitmaker
Region	Certification	Certified units/sales
New Zealand (RMNZ)	Gold	7,500^{‡}
United States (RIAA)	Platinum	1,000,000^{‡}
^{‡} Sales+streaming figures based on certification alone.
