= Nun of Dat =

2018 song by BlocBoy JB feat. Lil Pump

Promotional single by BlocBoy JB featuring Lil Pump

from the album Simi
- Released: May 2, 2018
- Length: 4:01
- Label: Bloc Nation
- Songwriters: James Lee Baker; Gazzy Garcia; Brytavious Lakeith Chambers
- Producer: Tay Keith

BlocBoy JB chronology
"Nun of Dat" (2018)	"Let It Go" (2018)

Lil Pump singles chronology
"Esskeetit" (2018)	"Nun of Dat" (2018)	"Welcome to the Party" (2018)

"Nun of Dat" is a song by American rapper BlocBoy JB featuring fellow American rapper Lil Pump. Written alongside producer Tay Keith, It was released as the only promotional single from BlocBoy's seventh mixtape, Simi, on May 2, 2018.

== Critical reception ==
The song received generally positive reviews. Nick Mojica of XXL called the track "hard-hitting", and that Lil Pump "matched BlocBoy JB's intensity". Darryl Robertson of Vibe called the record "fun-filled".

== Release history ==
Country	Date	Format	Label	Ref.
Various	May 2, 2018	Digital download; streaming	Bloc Nation	
