= Don't Think That =

EP by BlocBoy JB
- Released: October 30, 2018
- Recorded: 2018
- Genre: Hip hop
- Length: 15:37
- Label: Interscope
- Producer: Dreeko Beatz; Tay Keith; Babyxwater; Felipe S; Yung Lan; Kyle Resto; Dmac

BlocBoy JB chronology
Simi (2018)	Don't Think That (2018)	I Am Me (2019)

Singles from Don't Think That
- 1. "Don't Say That" Released: October 30, 2018; 2. "Club Roc" Released: October 30, 2018

Don't Think That is the debut extended play by American rapper BlocBoy JB. It was released on October 30, 2018, and includes guest features from Lil Uzi Vert and Hoodrich Pablo Juan.

The EP was supported by two singles: Both "Don't Say That" featuring Lil Uzi Vert and "Club Roc" were released as the EP's lead singles on October 30, 2018.

== Promotion ==
BlocBoy shared the cover for the EP on October 23, 2018. Mitch Findlay of HotNewHipHop called the cover "surreal" and "trippy".

=== Singles ===
"Don't Say That", featuring Lil Uzi Vert, was released as the EP's first single on October 30, 2018, along with the EP.

"Club Roc" was released as the EPs second single on October 30, 2018. A music video was released on the same day. Later on, BlocBoy broke down the song for music company Genius.

=== Music videos ===
A music video for "Rich Hoes", featuring Hoodrich Pablo Juan, was released on December 6, 2018.

== Critical reception ==
Don't Think That received mixed-to-positive reviews from critics. Sheldon Pearce of Pitchfork said that the mixtape's tracks were "good but inessential".

== Track listing ==
No.	Title	Writer(s)	Producer(s)	Length
1.	"Bloc"	James Lee Baker	Dreeko Beatz	2:06
2.	"Club Roc"	Baker; Brytavious Lakeith Chambers	Tay Keith	2:13
3.	"Don't Say That" (featuring Lil Uzi Vert)	Baker; Symere Woods	Babyxwater	2:46
4.	"Crip Lit"	Baker	Felipe S; Yung Lan	2:09
5.	"Bacc Street Boys"	Baker	Tay Keith	2:08
6.	"Rich Hoes" (featuring Hoodrich Pablo Juan)	Baker; Sterling Pennix	Kyle Resto	2:14
7.	"Makavelli"	Baker	Dmac	2:02
Total length:				15:37
