= Shoot (song) =

Single by BlocBoy JB

from the album Who Am I 3 & Simi
- Released: July 25, 2017
- Genre: Trap
- Length: 3:10
- Label: Bloc Nation
- Songwriters: James Lee Baker; Brytavious Lakeith Chambers
- Producer: Tay Keith

BlocBoy JB singles chronology
"First Day Bacc on Da Bloc" (2017)	"Shoot" (2017)	"Rover" (2018)

"Shoot" is a song by American rapper BlocBoy JB. His breakout song, it was released as the second single from his sixth mixtape Who Am I 3 on July 25, 2017. The song gained popularity for sparking its eponymous viral dance, the "Shoot".

== Music video ==
The music video for the track was released on July 25, 2017. The video was shot by Fredrivk Ali and features BlocBoy and other people partying on a basketball court.

== Critical reception ==
"Shoot" received generally positive reviews. Max Weinstein of XXL called the track "one of the hardest songs in Memphis", and that "you can't get the song out of your head".

== Charts ==
Chart (2018)	Peak position
US Bubbling Under Hot 100 Singles (Billboard)	18

== In popular culture ==
Hype dance

In May 2018, the popular video game Fortnite put the "Shoot" dance into their game, under the name "Hype".

=== Lawsuit ===
On January 23, 2019, it was announced that BlocBoy JB filed a lawsuit against Epic Games, the company behind Fortnite for allegedly using his "Shoot" dance without his permission or compensation.
