= Life Goes On (Lil Mosey song) =

Single by Lil Mosey
- Released: March 22, 2022
- Genre: Alternative pop
- Length: 2:46
- Label: Love U Forever; Cinq Music Group
- Songwriters: Lathan Echols; Harvey Mason Jr.; Saint Patrick; UV Killin Em
- Producers: Harvey Mason Jr.; Saint Patrick; UV Killin Em

Lil Mosey singles chronology
"One Too Many" (2024)	"Life Goes On" (2022)	"Back Down Road" (2024)

"Life Goes On" is a song recorded by American rapper Lil Mosey, released as a single on March 22, 2024. The song was produced by Harvey Mason Jr., Saint Patrick and UV Killin Em. The song adopts a new Alternative pop sound.

== Background ==
At the 2024 Billboard's Women in Music event Mosey teased the single and its release date. When asked what the song means to him Mosey said "It's just a reminder that, you know like, people go through things, everybody goes through things and somethings happen, and you know life goes on... it always gets better" referring to his 2021 false rape allegation case. He also stated the song was inspired by Olivia Rodrigo.
