= CB5 =

Mixtape by French Montana
- Released: November 20, 2020
- Length: 55:35
- Label: Coke Boy; Bad Boy; EMPIRE
- Producer: French Montana (also exec.); Harry Fraud (also exec.); 1st Class; 808Melo; Arizonaslimbeats; Bhawkmusic; Cardiak; Felipe Spain; Foreign Teck; Hitmaka; Jasper Harris; JetsonMade; Kid Culture; KrueOnTheBeat; Lucky Loop; Marlon Miller; Mixx; Paul Couture; Prezident Jeff; Redhooknoodles; Starboy; Tay Keith; Tyquilmadethis; Vadebeatz; Zaki

French Montana chronology
Montana (2019)	CB5 (2020)	They Got Amnesia (2021)

Singles from CB5
- 1. "Double G" Released: October 30, 2020; 2. "Wave Blues" Released: November 9, 2020; 3. "Hot Boy Bling" Released: January 5, 2021

CB5 is the twenty-second mixtape by Moroccan-American rapper French Montana. It was released through EMPIRE on November 20, 2020. The mixtape features guest appearances from Jim Jones, Lil Durk, the late Pop Smoke, Jack Harlow, the late Chinx, Rafi Malice, Max B, YoungBoy Never Broke Again, Benny the Butcher, Montana's younger brother Zak, ASAP Rocky, LGP Qua, Lil Mosey, and Currensy. On November 27, 2020, Montana released the deluxe edition of the mixtape with five additional tracks, but ended up taking it down a few days later for unknown reasons.

Professional ratings
Review scores
Source	Rating
Allmusic	3/5 stars

== Background ==
The title of the mixtape is an acronym for "Coke Boys 5". It is the fifth installment of French Montana's Coke Boys mixtape series. Coke Boys is also the name of the artist's record label, which is where the name originates from. The first word also stands for "Creation of Kings Everywhere". Signed to the label, Montana had artists like Chinx and Max B, and previously Lil Durk.

== Release and promotion ==
On October 31, 2020, French Montana confirmed on Twitter that the mixtape had been finished and ready to go, promoting some merchandise. He confirmed the release date on November 11, 2020 in an Instagram story, followed by a pre-order link back to Twitter on November 16, 2020, which revealed its official artwork. Finally, he revealed the track listing on November 18, 2020.

== Singles ==
The mixtape's lead single, "Double G", featuring late American rapper Pop Smoke, was released on October 30, 2020. Following it, "Wave Blues", featuring American rapper Benny the Butcher, the second single, was released on November 9, 2020, which was French Montana's 36th birthday. "Hot Boy Bling", featuring American rappers Jack Harlow and Lil Durk, was sent to rhythmic contemporary radio as the third and final single on January 5, 2021.

== Critical reception ==
DJ First Class of Revolt compared the mixtape to French Montana's previous projects, stating that it "is as solid as solid can be". Quincy of Ratings Game Music gave the mixtape a rating of a D; he praised the different patterns and each featured artist's frequency, opining that Montana "knows how to play orchestrator really well" and that "he channels his old self, he goes toe to toe with true lyricists, and he actually blesses us with hooks that will probably turn clubs upside down".

== Track listing ==
Credits adapted from Tidal.

CB5 track listing
No.	Title	Writer(s)	Producer(s)	Length
1.	"Too Late" (featuring Jim Jones)	Karim Kharbouch; Joseph Jones II; Arizonaslimbeats; Bhawkmusic; Baruch Nembhard; Florence Welsh	Arizonaslimbeats; Bhawkmusic	3:15
2.	"Brothers" (featuring Lil Durk)	K. Kharbouch; Durk Banks; Rory Quigley; Baruch Nembhard	Harry Fraud; Mixx	3:07
3.	"Double G" (featuring Pop Smoke)	K. Kharbouch; Bashar Jackson; Andre Loblack	808Melo	2:37
4.	"Hot Boy Bling" (featuring Jack Harlow and Lil Durk)	K. Kharbouch; Jackman Harlow; Banks; Tahj Morgan; Jasper Harris; Anton Mendo; Khaleel Griffin; Andre Proctor; Terrence Cole; Eugene Bentley	JetsonMade; Harris; Starboy; 1st Class	3:00
5.	"FTMU"	K. Kharbouch; Chrishan Ward; Brytavious Chambers	Hitmaka; Tay Keith	3:17
6.	"Could It Be" (featuring Chinx)	K. Kharbouch; Lionel Pickens; Quigley	Harry Fraud	2:53
7.	"Paradise" (featuring Rafi Malice and Max B)	K. Kharbouch; Rafi Malice; Charley Wingate; Tyler Paparella	Tyquilmadethis|BKH Beats	3:25
8.	"So Real" (featuring YoungBoy Never Broke Again)	K. Kharbouch; Kentrell Gaulden; Felipe Espana; David Boonpetch	Felipe Spain; Vadabeatz	2:30
9.	"Wave Blues" (featuring Benny the Butcher)	K. Kharbouch; Jeremie Pennick; Brandon Hawk; Arizonaslimbeats	Bhawkmusic; Arizonaslimbeats	4:09
10.	"Yes Sir" (featuring Lil Durk)	K. Kharbouch; Banks; Marlon Miller; Zaki; KrueOnTheBeat	Miller; Zaki; KrueOnTheBeat	3:30
11.	"I Know" (featuring Chinx)	K. Kharbouch; Pickens; Arizonaslimbeats; Redhooknoodles	French Montana; Arizonaslimbeats; Redhooknoodles	3:47
12.	"Phenomenon" (featuring Max B)	K. Kharbouch; Wingate; Paul Couture	Couture	2:58
13.	"Corner" (featuring Zak and ASAP Rocky)	K. Kharbouch; Zakaria Kharbouch; Rakim Mayers; Michael Hernandez; Jeffery Offe	Foreign Teck; Prezident Jeff	3:42
14.	"Straight for the Bag" (featuring LGP Qua)	K. Kharbouch; Qidere Johnson; Quigley	Harry Fraud	2:41
15.	"How We Doin It" (featuring Lil Mosey)	K. Kharbouch; Lathan Echols; Daniel Hackett	Kid Culture	2:22
16.	"You Deserve an Oscar"	K. Kharbouch; Nembhard; Jörn Erkau	French Montana; Mixx; Lucky Loop	3:47
17.	"Fallin (In The Sun, Pt.2)" (featuring Currensy)	K. Kharbouch; Shante Franklin; Quigley	Harry Fraud	2:34
18.	"Who Dat"	K. Kharbouch; Ward; Carl McCormick; London Jae; Paul Cabbin	Hitmaka; Cardiak	2:43
19.	"Big Cap"	K. Kharbouch; Nembhard	Mixx	2:38
Total length:				55:35

CB5 (Deluxe Version) track listing
No.	Title	Writer(s)	Length
20.	"Know Why"	K. Kharbouch	2:23
21.	"Don't Feel Right"	K. Kharbouch	1:55
22.	"Patience"	K. Kharbouch	3:00
23.	"Grownd Up"	K. Kharbouch	2:26
24.	"Bronx Collage"	K. Kharbouch	1:50

== Personnel ==
Credits adapted from Tidal.

- French Montana – primary artist (all tracks)
- Jim Jones – featured artist (track 1)
- Lil Durk – featured artist (tracks 2, 4, 10)
- Pop Smoke – featured artist (track 3)
- Jack Harlow – featured artist (track 4)
- Chinx – featured artist (tracks 6, 11)
- Max B – featured artist (tracks 7, 12)
- Rafi Malice – featured artist (track 7)
- YoungBoy Never Broke Again – featured artist (track 8)
- Benny the Butcher – featured artist (track 9)
- Zak – featured artist (track 13)
- ASAP Rocky – featured artist (track 13)
- LGP Qua – featured artist (track 14)
- Lil Mosey – featured artist (track 15)
- Currensy – featured artist (track 17)

Sample credits

- "Too Late" contains samples from "Long & Lost" by Florence + Machine
- "I Know" contains samples from Starry Eyed by Ellie Goulding.
- "Wave Blues" contains samples from "I'll Never Love" by Michael Kiwanuka
- "Who Dat" contains samples from "Like Whaaat" by Problem, featuring Bad Lucc

== Charts ==
Chart performance for CB5
Chart (2020)	Peak position
US Billboard 200	51
US Top R&B/Hip-Hop Albums (Billboard)	26

== Release history ==
Region	Date	Format(s)	Label	Ref.
Various	November 20, 2020	Digital download; streaming	Coke Boy; Bad Boy; Epic	
