= Noticed (song) =

2018 song by Lil Mosey

Single by Lil Mosey

from the album Northsbest
- Released: July 20, 2018
- Genre: Hip hop; pop rap; trap
- Length: 2:45
- Label: Mogul Vision; Interscope
- Songwriters: Lathan Echols; Royce Pearson; Cody Collick
- Producer: Royce David

Lil Mosey singles chronology
"Boof Pack" (2018)	"Noticed" (2018)	"Yoppa" (2018)

Music video
- "Noticed" on YouTube

"Noticed" is a song by American rapper Lil Mosey. It was released on July 20, 2018, and is the third single from Mosey's debut studio album Northsbest. Produced by Royce David, who produced most of the tracks on Northsbest, the song peaked at number 80 on the US Billboard Hot 100. It was named one of the five hip hop singles to watch of fall 2018 by Forbes. The track was also noted for its lyrical references to and presence of lean on the cover art and in its video. "Noticed" has gone on to become one of Mosey's most popular songs, and is his second most streamed song on Spotify, only behind "Blueberry Faygo".

== Composition ==
Forbes called the track a "rap-sung hybrid". "Noticed" also makes use of Auto-Tune on Mosey's vocals. Lyrically, Lil Mosey boasts about how much he earns and the changes in his lifestyle. In an interview with Genius, Mosey stated that another, slower version of the song was released in 2017, but was copyrighted. The new version was more fast-paced, and interpolates the original with the lines: "Yeah, Grew on 50 Avenue, tweakers layed up next to dude/Need a bigger revenue, so I stay tryna sell to you/****** always testin' me, so I stay with the .32/You can't hang with bros and me, 'cause we gon' blast that .22/You knew *****, I said you knew/I turn heads when I, roll through yeah/You know I'm with, with the crew yeah/Circle small, so it''s just 2 times 2, yeah". Mosey and David then decided to remake the song. The original version is still available through SoundCloud, and Mosey's YouTube channel.

== Music video ==
The video was directed by Cole Bennett and features Lil Mosey showing off his "flashy lifestyle" including his jewelry and cars, as well as lying in bed next to a girl and waking up in a condo located in the mountains. The music video has almost 290 million views and is one of the most viewed music videos on Lyrical Lemonade's YouTube channel.

== Personnel ==
Credits adapted from the album's liner notes and Tidal.

- Royce David – production, composition, mixing, studio personnel

== Charts ==
Chart (2018)	Peak position
Belgium (Ultratip Bubbling Under Flanders)	37
Canada (Canadian Hot 100)	50
Czech Republic Singles Digital (ČNS IFPI)	81
Ireland (IRMA)	67
Lithuania (AGATA)	31
New Zealand Hot Singles (RMNZ)	33
Portugal (AFP)	67
Sweden Heatseeker (Sverigetopplistan)	1
US Billboard Hot 100 (Billboard)	80
US Hot R&B/Hip-Hop Songs (Billboard)	38

== Certifications ==
Region	Certification	Certified units/sales
Brazil (Pro-Música Brasil)	Platinum	40,000^{‡}
Denmark (IFPI Danmark)	Platinum	90,000^{‡}
France (SNEP)	Gold	100,000^{‡}
New Zealand (RMNZ)	Platinum	30,000^{‡}
Portugal (AFP)	Platinum	10,000^{‡}
United Kingdom (BPI)	Gold	400,000^{‡}
United States (RIAA)	3× Platinum	3,000,000^{‡}
^{‡} Sales+streaming figures based on certification alone.
