= Mercedes (BlocBoy JB song) =

Single by BlocBoy JB

from the album I Am Me
- Released: May 23, 2019
- Length: 2:05
- Label: Bloc Nation
- Songwriters: James Lee Baker; Dilip Venkatesh; Otxhello Houston
- Producers: Dilip; Otxhello

BlocBoy JB singles chronology
"Don't Be Mad" (2019)	"Mercedes" (2019)	"TracBoy" (2019)

"Mercedes" is a song by American rapper BlocBoy JB. It was released as the second single from his eighth mixtape I Am Me on May 23, 2019.

== Background ==
The song was BlocBoy's first release as a solo artist on streaming platforms in 2019. The track was teased earlier on in 2019 with a Triller video posted to BlocBoy's Instagram account. The video almost reached a million views.

== Music video ==
The music video for the song was released on May 28, 2019. It was directed by Hidji World.

== Critical reception ==
The song received extremely positive reviews. Alex Zidel of HotNewHipHop called the track a "certified bop", and said it was "bouncy". Jewel Wicker of The Fader said that the track "will make fans dance on Triller and beyond", saying the track "is only two minutes, but it's catchy enough that fans will likely have it on a loop". An unnamed writer of The Double Cup called the track a "jam", saying that it is "really fun to listen and dance to".
