= Pull Up (Lil Mosey song) =

2017 debut single by Lil Mosey

Single by Lil Mosey

from the album Northsbest
- Released: December 7, 2017
- Length: 3:03
- Label: Mogul Vision; Interscope
- Songwriter(s): Lathan Echols; Kevin Essett
- Producer(s): BlackMayo

Lil Mosey singles chronology
"Pull Up" (2017)	"Boof Pack" (2018)

Music video
- "Pull Up" on YouTube

"Pull Up" is a song by American rapper Lil Mosey, released on December 7, 2017 and produced by BlackMayo. It is his debut commercial single, the lead single from his debut studio album Northsbest (2018), and considered his breakout hit.

== Background ==
Lil Mosey found the instrumental of the song on YouTube as a "Lil Uzi Vert type beat" and decided to write a catchy verse to it. The music video was shot in his hometown of Seattle. The song gained much attention upon release; according to Lil Mosey, "Everyone around me was just listening to it in my city. And it just kept getting farther. Because the first day it hit 10k, second day it hit, like, 30, then it hit 60, then, like, a hundred, 180. Then it kept going [up] to a million."

== Critical reception ==
Hef of Elevator Mag gave a favorable review of the song, writing "It's a well-done track that shows off his unique sound and style as he comes correct with some fiery rhymes and lines across the ethereal production, adding up to a dope track with a dope video to match."

== Certifications ==
Region	Certification	Certified units/sales
United States (RIAA)	Gold	500,000^{‡}
^{‡} Sales+streaming figures based on certification alone.
