= Kamikaze (Lil Mosey song) =

2018 song by Lil Mosey

Song by Lil Mosey

from the album Northsbest
- Released: October 19, 2018
- Recorded: 2018
- Genre: Hip hop • pop rap • trap
- Length: 2:19
- Label: Mogul Vision; Interscope
- Songwriters: Lathan Echols; Royce Pearson; Daniel Hackett; Claudio Cueni; Christopher Strokes
- Producers: Royce David; Kid Culture

Music video
- "Kamikaze" on YouTube

"Kamikaze" (also titled "Kamakaze" on the clean version) is a song by American rapper Lil Mosey. It is the first track from his debut studio album, Northsbest, released on October 19, 2018. Produced by Royce David and Kid Culture, it is built around a "Never Lie" sample by Immature. Lyrically, Lil Mosey gives the impression that he and his friends are ready for anything. Although not released as a single, the song quickly became a hit upon its music video release four days after Northsbest was released. "Kamikaze" peaked at number 97 on the US Billboard Hot 100 and has become one of Mosey's most popular songs.

== Music video ==
Directed by Cole Bennett, the music video was released on Lyrical Lemonade's YouTube channel on October 23, 2018. It sees Lil Mosey on a rooftop. At the end of the video, he narrowly escapes masked gunmen with help from a girl. The music video has amassed over 80 million views to date.

== Charts ==
Chart (2018)	Peak position
Canada Hot 100 (Billboard)	89
US Billboard Hot 100	97
US Hot R&B/Hip-Hop Songs (Billboard)	47

== Certifications ==
Region	Certification	Certified units/sales
New Zealand (RMNZ)	Gold	15,000^{‡}
United Kingdom (BPI)	Silver	200,000^{‡}
United States (RIAA)	Platinum	1,000,000^{‡}
^{‡} Sales+streaming figures based on certification alone.
