= By Yourself (Lil Mosey song) =

Single by Lil Mosey

from the album Love U Forever
- Released: July 26, 2024
- Genre: Alternative pop; hip-hop
- Length: 2:44
- Label: Love U Forever; Cinq Music Group
- Songwriters: Lathan Echols; Otisprod; JHURLY
- Producers: Otisprod; JHURLY

Lil Mosey singles chronology
"Thug Popstar" (2024)	"By Yourself" (2024)	"Not You" (2024)

"By Yourself" is a song recorded by American rapper Lil Mosey, released as a single on July 26, 2024. The song was produced by Otisprod and JHURLY. "By Yourself" is the lead single to Mosey's third EP Love U Forever.

== Background ==
At the 2024 BET Awards Mosey revealed he would be releasing an Extended Play in August and that the lead single would be released in July.

"The track empowers Black women to operate from self-love and self-assurance rather than co-dependency and falling in step with society’s misogynistic traditions. The tune follows the recent music trend of men cheering on women, like recent hits “You Got It” by Vedo and Skilla Baby’s “Bae.”"

Mosey performed and promoted the song on PIX11 News in September 2024.
