= Fall City (EP) =

EP by Lil Mosey
- Released: September 26, 2025
- Length: 16:25
- Labels: Love U Forever; Cinq Music Group
- Producers: fl0wzy; mlodyhubson; Naxy; prodf1sh; Skittles; Tadeoexq; yxngkenay

Lil Mosey chronology
Love U Forever (2024)	Fall City (2025)

Singles from Fall City
- 1. "Margiela Pink" Released: September 19, 2025

Fall City is the fourth extended play by American rapper Lil Mosey, it follows his previous EP Love U Forever. It was released on September 26, 2025, by Mosey's own record label Love U Forever and Cinq Music Group. The EP was supported by one single, "Margiela Pink", released on September 19, 2025.

== Singles ==
The lead and only single for Fall City, "Margiela Pink" was released one week prior to the release of the EP on September 19, 2025. A music video was released the same day.

== Track listing ==
All tracks are written by Lathan Echols.

Fall City track listing
No.	Title	Producer(s)	Length
1.	"Heavily"	Tadeoexq; Naxy	2:27
2.	"Loaded"	Tadeoexq	2:06
3.	"Margiela Pink"	Tadeoexq	1:32
4.	"Love U Bby"	Tadeoexq	1:45
5.	"<3"	fl0wzy; yxngkenay	2:12
6.	"24/7"	mlodyhubson; yxngkenay; prodf1sh	2:00
7.	"Maybeezy"	Tadeoexq	1:53
8.	"Feel"	Skittles; yxngkenay	2:28
Total length:			16:25
