= Love U Forever =

EP by Lil Mosey
- Released: August 9, 2024
- Length: 22:54
- Labels: Love U Forever; Cinq Music Group
- Producers: Cha Cha Malone; Gabe Lucas; JHurly; Nobuddy; Otisprod; Supah Mario

Lil Mosey chronology
VER (2022)	Love U Forever (2024)	Fall City (2025)

Singles from Love U Forever
- 1. "By Yourself" Released: July 26, 2024

Love U Forever is the third extended play by American rapper Lil Mosey. It was released on August 9, 2024, by Mosey's own record label Love U Forever and Cinq Music Group. The EP was supported by a sole single, "By Yourself", released on July 26, 2024.

== Singles ==
The lead and sole single to the project, "By Yourself" was released on July 26, 2024. Rashad Milligan of Rolling Out said "The track empowers Black women to operate from self-love and self-assurance rather than co-dependency and falling in step with society's misogynistic traditions. The tune follows the recent music trend of men cheering on women, like recent hits 'You Got It' by Vedo and Skilla Baby's 'Bae.'"

== Track listing ==
All tracks are written by Lathan Echols.

Love U Forever track listing
No.	Title	Producer(s)	Length
1.	"Go Ahead"	Otisprod	2:59
2.	"By Yourself"	Otisprod; JHurly	2:44
3.	"Planet"	Otisprod; Supah Mario	3:19
4.	"Me vs Me"	Otisprod	2:31
5.	"Stuck in October"	Otisprod	2:50
6.	"So What"	Otisprod	2:49
7.	"This Time"	Nobuddy; Gabe Lewis	2:51
8.	"She Knows"	Cha Cha Malone	2:48
Total length:			22:54
