= Prod by Bloc =

Single by BlocBoy JB
- Released: April 17, 2018
- Length: 2:59
- Label: Bloc Nation
- Songwriter: James Lee Baker
- Producer: BlocBoy JB

BlocBoy JB singles chronology
| "Bad Company" (2018) | "Prod by Bloc" (2018) | "Let It Go" (2018) |

"Prod by Bloc" (released on streaming platforms as "Produced by Blocboy") is a song by American rapper BlocBoy JB. It was released as a standalone single on April 17, 2018.

== Background ==
The song is the first song that BlocBoy JB has ever produced. He spoke about the making of the track in an interview with The Fader.

One day I was in the studio with Trakboi and he left his drum pad on. So, I hopped on it and was like "Fucc it let me make a beat" because Tay Keith was moving too slow. I was just joking around, but Trak was like "Go 'head and try it out." It resulted in me making this beat is like one or two minutes. My beats remind me of beatin' on a desk in the classroom once the teacher leaves. But hell yeah, I plan on making more beats for sure.

— BlocBoy JB

== Music video ==
The music video was released on April 17, 2018, along with the single. The video features BlocBoy and his friends dancing with pots and pans.

=== Reception ===
Peter A. Berry of XXL called the video "energetic".

== Critical reception ==
The track received generally positive reviews. Seamus Fay of Lyrical Lemonade called the track "a banger in every sense of the word". Liam of Elevator called the track an "anthem", and said it was "one of BlocBoy's strongest efforts yet".
