= Blueberry Faygo =

2020 single by Lil Mosey

Single by Lil Mosey

from the album Certified Hitmaker (reissue)
- Released: February 7, 2020
- Recorded: June 5, 2019
- Genre: Hip hop
- Length: 2:42
- Label: Mogul Vision; Interscope
- Songwriters: Lathan Echols; Johnny Gill; Darryl Simmons; Antonio Reid; Kenneth Edmonds; Callan Wong
- Producer: Callan

Lil Mosey singles chronology
"Live This Wild" (2019)	"Blueberry Faygo" (2020)	"Only the Team" (2020)

Music video
- "Blueberry Faygo" on YouTube

"Blueberry Faygo" is a song by American rapper Lil Mosey. The song was made and leaked on June 5, 2019, when multiple imposters distributed bootleg versions of the song onto Spotify, racking up millions of streams, before being removed. The song's release was delayed due to a sample clearance agreement and was eventually released on February 7, 2020, by Mogul Vision Music and Interscope Records. It was released concurrently with the reissue of Lil Mosey's second studio album Certified Hitmaker (2019), which the single appears on. It is Mosey's most successful song to date, peaking at number 8 on the US Billboard Hot 100, and is his only top 10 entry on the chart. On February 26, 2022, about two years after its release, it surpassed one billion streams on Spotify. The song's title refers to Faygo, a brand of soft drinks. The song has since come to be regarded as Lil Mosey's signature song.

== Background ==
In June 2019, a leaked version of the song surfaced online. Soon after that, the lyrics were transcribed onto Genius. The page attracted a small but consistent amount of attention over the next few months, and fans asked Lil Mosey to release the song on social media. In late 2019, a leaked upload of the track on Spotify reached 22 million streams before it was taken down. It was followed by numerous others; uploaded with fake titles and artist credits by fans and hackers aiming to capitalize on its streaming potential, using names like "Blueberry Fuego," "Blueberry Fayego," and other similar titles, which also led to them charting on the New Zealand Singles Chart. At the same time, the song went viral, before it was officially released on February 7, 2020. It was released concurrently with the reissue of Lil Mosey's second album Certified Hitmaker, with Mosey's management explaining that fans had begged for the song to be released (on the reissue).

== Composition ==
"Blueberry Faygo" was produced by Callan; the basis is composed by a sped-up sample of "My, My, My", a 1990 song by American singer-songwriter Johnny Gill. The track has been noted for its appeal to the TikTok demographic. Alex Zidel of HotNewHipHop labelled "Blueberry Faygo" a "bouncy summer joint", and further complimented Lil Mosey's "clever" rhyme scheme in the hook, with the rapper "counting up and using nursery rhyme tactics to ensure a hit on his part". Jessica McKinney of Complex had a similar notion, also calling it "bouncy", with a "catchy hook", and stated the track has "'summer vibes' written all over it".

== Music video ==
The song's official music video was released on March 26, 2020. It was released through music video director Cole Bennett's YouTube channel as he produced and directed it for his company Lyrical Lemonade. The video features appearances from Australian rapper The Kid Laroi and TikTok stars Addison Rae and Lil Huddy. It was filmed at The Hype House, a TikTok mansion in Los Angeles, where Mosey is throwing a pool party with an army of synchronized swimmers. The music video has been viewed over 300 million times and is one of the most viewed music videos on Lyrical Lemonade's YouTube channel.

== Chart performance ==
"Blueberry Faygo" debuted at number 62 on the US Billboard Hot 100, tying with Lil Mosey's single "Stuck in a Dream", his highest-charting song before. It later surpassed "Stuck in a Dream", peaking at number 8, becoming Mosey's first top 10 entry on the US Billboard Hot 100. Outside the US, Blueberry Faygo topped the Belgium Ultratip. It also reached the top 5 in Ireland and Greece, peaking at number 4 in both countries.

== Charts ==
=== Weekly charts ===
==== Official version ====
Chart (2020)	Peak position
Australia (ARIA)	16
Austria (Ö3 Austria Top 40)	29
Belgium (Ultratip Bubbling Under Flanders)	1
Belgium (Ultratip Bubbling Under Wallonia)	5
Canada Hot 100 (Billboard)	8
Canada CHR/Top 40 (Billboard)	34
Czech Republic Singles Digital (ČNS IFPI)	16
Denmark (Tracklisten)	13
Estonia (Eesti Tipp-40)	6
Finland (Suomen virallinen lista)	10
France (SNEP)	109
Germany (GfK)	37
Global 200 (Billboard)	62
Greece International (IFPI)	4
Hungary (Stream Top 40)	7
Iceland (Tónlistinn)	15
Ireland (IRMA)	4
Italy (FIMI)	77
Lithuania (AGATA)	12
Netherlands (Single Top 100)	34
New Zealand (Recorded Music NZ)	10
Norway (VG-lista)	15
Portugal (AFP)	9
Romania (Airplay 100)	70
Scotland Singles (OCC)	72
Singapore (RIAS)	11
Slovakia Singles Digital (ČNS IFPI)	14
Sweden (Sverigetopplistan)	20
Switzerland (Schweizer Hitparade)	28
UK Singles (OCC)	9
US Billboard Hot 100	8
US Dance/Mix Show Airplay (Billboard)	25
US Hot R&B/Hip-Hop Songs (Billboard)	5
US Pop Airplay (Billboard)	13
US Rhythmic Airplay (Billboard)	1
US Rolling Stone Top 100	6

==== Mikey.Otx leaked version ====
Chart (2020)	Peak position
New Zealand Hot Singles (RMNZ)	21

==== 73bands leaked version ====
Chart (2020)	Peak position
New Zealand Hot Singles (RMNZ)	27

=== Year-end charts ===
Chart (2020)	Position
Australia (ARIA)	43
Canada (Canadian Hot 100)	29
Denmark (Tracklisten)	54
Hungary (Stream Top 40)	27
Iceland (Tónlistinn)	56
Ireland (IRMA)	30
Netherlands (Single Top 100)	94
New Zealand (Recorded Music NZ)	29
Portugal (AFP)	24
Sweden (Sverigetopplistan)	62
Switzerland (Schweizer Hitparade)	85
UK Singles (OCC)	39
US Billboard Hot 100	27
US Hot R&B/Hip-Hop Songs (Billboard)	13
US Mainstream Top 40 (Billboard)	46
US Rhythmic (Billboard)	4

Chart (2021)	Position
Portugal (AFP)	156

== Certifications ==
Region	Certification	Certified units/sales
Australia (ARIA)	2× Platinum	140,000^{‡}
Austria (IFPI Austria)	Gold	15,000^{‡}
Brazil (Pro-Música Brasil)	Diamond	160,000^{‡}
Canada (Music Canada)	4× Platinum	320,000^{‡}
Denmark (IFPI Danmark)	Platinum	90,000^{‡}
France (SNEP)	Gold	100,000^{‡}
Germany (BVMI)	Gold	200,000^{‡}
Italy (FIMI)	Gold	35,000^{‡}
New Zealand (RMNZ)	3× Platinum	90,000^{‡}
Poland (ZPAV)	Platinum	50,000^{‡}
Portugal (AFP)	2× Platinum	20,000^{‡}
Spain (Promusicae)	Gold	30,000^{‡}
United Kingdom (BPI)	Platinum	600,000^{‡}
United States (RIAA)	6× Platinum	6,000,000^{‡}
Streaming
Greece (IFPI Greece)	Platinum	2,000,000^{†}
^{‡} Sales+streaming figures based on certification alone.^{†} Streaming-only figures based on certification alone.

== Release history ==
Country	Date	Format	Label	Ref.
Various	February 7, 2020	Digital download; streaming	Interscope	
United States	March 10, 2020	Rhythmic contemporary radio	Interscope	
United States	May 19, 2020	Contemporary hit radio	Interscope	
