= Swervin (BlocBoy JB song) =

Single by BlocBoy JB

from the album FatBoy
- Released: March 26, 2020
- Length: 2:13
- Label: Foundation; Interscope
- Songwriters: James Baker; Amari Freement
- Producer: Ace Charisma

BlocBoy JB singles chronology
"ChopBloc 2" (2019)	"Swervin" (2020)	"No Chorus, Pt. 12" (2020)

"Swervin" is a song by American rapper BlocBoy JB. It was released on March 26, 2020, through Foundation Entertainment and Interscope, as the lead single from his debut studio album FatBoy.

== Background ==
"Swervin" was BlocBoy's first streaming release of 2020.

== Music video ==
The music video was released on March 26, 2020. The video was shot at a car warehouse. In the video, BlocBoy and his friends are seen doing a dance called "The Clutch". He described the video as "last minute" with "limited resources".

I was on Trippie Redd's Love Me More Tour while we shot this video. It was a day off in Des Moines, Iowa. I had videographer Zach Hurth and gang with me, so we decided to pull off something last minute. We couldn't rent any exotic cars last minute so we just found this random car lot warehouse, dressed up and made this happened. Random shit.

— BlocBoy JB,

The music video has currently over one million views on YouTube.

== Critical reception ==
The song received generally positive reviews. Sheldon Pearce of Pitchfork said the track was "proof of what BlocBoy is still capable of", and said that "the still-promising rapper rediscovers his fun-loving, tongue-in-cheek style". Charlie Zhang of Hypebeast called the track "catchy".
