= Rover (BlocBoy JB song) =

2018 song by BlocBoy JB

Single by BlocBoy JB
- Released: January 13, 2018
- Length: 3:32
- Label: Bloc Nation
- Songwriters: James Lee Baker; Brytavious Lakeith Chambers
- Producer: Tay Keith

BlocBoy JB singles chronology
"Shoot" (2017)	"Rover" (2018)	"Look Alive" (2018)

"Rover" is a song by American rapper BlocBoy JB. It was released on January 13, 2018, as a standalone single. It was produced by Tay Keith.

A remix titled "Rover 2.0" featuring rapper 21 Savage was released on March 23, 2018. The remix peaked at number two on the US Bubbling Under Hot 100 Singles chart.

== Music video ==
A music video for the track was released on January 4, 2018, nine days before the track was released on streaming services. The video premiered on the WorldStarHipHop channel on YouTube.

== Critical reception ==
Michelle Kim of Pitchfork called the track a "banger" and a "bop", and said that the beat was "danceable".

== Remix ==
"Rover 2.0"

Single by BlocBoy JB featuring 21 Savage

from the album Simi
- Released: March 23, 2018
- Length: 4:36
- Label: Bloc Nation
- Songwriters: James Lee Baker; Shéyaa Bin Abraham-Joseph; Brytavious Lakeith Chambers
- Producer: Tay Keith

BlocBoy JB singles chronology
"Look Alive" (2018)	"Rover 2.0" (2018)	"Bad Company" (2018)

21 Savage singles chronology
"Since When" (2018)	"Rover 2.0" (2018)	"4 5 (Remix)" (2018)

The remix of the track was released on March 23, 2018, with a feature from 21 Savage. The remix also included a brand new first verse by BlocBoy JB. The remix later appeared on BlocBoy JB's mixtape Simi.

=== Music video ===
The music video was released on March 23, 2018, the same day as the single.

=== Critical reception ===
Michelle Kim of Pitchfork said the remix "wasn't exactly an upgrade", and called BlocBoy's new verse "somewhat stilted".

=== Charts ===
Chart performance for "Rover"
Chart (2018)	Peak position
US Bubbling Under Hot 100 Singles (Billboard)	2
US Hot R&B/Hip-Hop Songs (Billboard)	49
US R&B/Hip-Hop Airplay (Billboard)	39
