= No Chorus, Pt. 12 =

Single by BlocBoy JB featuring Tay Keith

from the album FatBoy
- Released: May 19, 2020
- Length: 3:51
- Label: Foundation; Interscope; Bloc Nation
- Songwriters: James Baker; Brytavious Chambers
- Producer: Tay Keith

BlocBoy JB singles chronology
"Swervin" (2020)	"No Chorus, Pt. 12" (2020)	"Do What I Do" (2020)

"No Chorus, Pt. 12" is a song by American rapper BlocBoy JB featuring record producer Tay Keith. It was released on May 19, 2020, as the second single from his debut studio album FatBoy.

== Background ==
The track is BlocBoy's 12th installment in his popular "No Chorus" song series, with the previous installment being "No Chorus, Pt. 11" in May 2018, more than two years before this installment. BlocBoy first teased the song back in June 2019. BlocBoy and Tay Keith last collaborated back in June 2019, on BlocBoy's track "Head In My Lap".

== Music video ==
BlocBoy said that the music video for the track was "done" on May 13, 2020, with a tweet of an earlier snippet he posted of the track. However, the video was not released alongside the track. On May 20, 2020, a day after the track's release, he posted a video of the music video shoot. The video showed police officers at the shoot. An officer started firing his gun, prompting many people to run away. The music video was finally released on May 26, 2020, with guest appearances from NLE Choppa and more.

== Critical reception ==
The song received generally positive reviews. Charlie Zhang of Hypebeast said the track "delivered a steady flow of bars" and called it "lyrical", and that the instrumental was "trap-tinged with pounding 808s". Aron A. of HotNewHipHop called the track a "banger", and called the instrumental "bass-heavy" and "minimalistic", saying that although "the pair doesn't necessarily deliver the same type of hit-making magic as they did in 2018", it was "certainly one of the tighter efforts from BlocBoy in recent times".
