= Look Alive (BlocBoy JB song) =

Single by BlocBoy JB featuring Drake

from the album Simi
- Released: February 9, 2018
- Recorded: 2017
- Genre: Hip hop; trap
- Length: 3:01
- Label: OVO; Warner Bros.
- Songwriters: James Baker; Aubrey Graham; Brytavious Chambers
- Producer: Tay Keith

BlocBoy JB singles chronology
"Rover" (2018)	"Look Alive" (2018)	"Rover 2.0" (2018)

Drake singles chronology
"God's Plan" (2018)	"Look Alive" (2018)	"Lemon (Drake Remix)" (2018)

Music video
- "Look Alive" on YouTube

"Look Alive" is a song by American rapper BlocBoy JB featuring Canadian rapper Drake. Written alongside the late producer Tay Keith, it was released on February 9, 2018, as the lead single off BlocBoy JB's mixtape Simi. It debuted at number six and later peaked at number five on the US Billboard Hot 100, which makes it the first top 10 single for BlocBoy JB and 23rd for Drake.

== Music video ==
The music video of the song was released the same day as the song itself, It features BlocBoy JB, Drake, Tay Keith, rappers Moneybagg Yo and Quando Rondo, former Memphis Grizzlies forward Zach Randolph, and their crew at various locations in Memphis. The video has gained 400 million YouTube views as of August 2025.

== Remix ==
On February 11, 2018, British rapper Scarlxrd released a remix of the song and titled it “LXXK DEAD”.

On March 4, 2018, American rapper Joyner Lucas released a remix onto SoundCloud and YouTube.

On March 24, 2019, Australian rapper Fortay released a remix of "Look Alive" using the same beat, but new lyrics.

On August 31, 2018 American Rapper Eminem released his Album Kamikaze containing the song Not Alike. In the first part of the song, the Tay Keith-produced instrumental interpolates BlocBoy JB's "Look Alive", while Eminem imitates the flow of Migos' "Bad and Boujee".

== Charts ==
=== Weekly charts ===
Chart (2018)	Peak position
Australia (ARIA)	24
Austria (Ö3 Austria Top 40)	48
Belgium (Ultratip Bubbling Under Flanders)	2
Belgium (Ultratip Bubbling Under Wallonia)	11
Canada Hot 100 (Billboard)	4
Czech Republic Singles Digital (ČNS IFPI)	50
Denmark (Tracklisten)	36
France (SNEP)	125
Germany (GfK)	48
Hungary (Stream Top 40)	34
Ireland (IRMA)	16
Netherlands (Single Top 100)	35
New Zealand (Recorded Music NZ)	15
Norway (VG-lista)	21
Portugal (AFP)	14
Slovakia Singles Digital (ČNS IFPI)	49
Sweden (Sverigetopplistan)	30
Switzerland (Schweizer Hitparade)	34
UK Singles (OCC)	17
UK Hip Hop/R&B (OCC)	9
US Billboard Hot 100	5
US Hot R&B/Hip-Hop Songs (Billboard)	3
US Rhythmic Airplay (Billboard)	2

=== Year-end charts ===
Chart (2018)	Position
Australia (ARIA)	79
Canada (Canadian Hot 100)	23
New Zealand (Recorded Music NZ)	47
Portugal (AFP)	43
UK Singles (Official Charts Company)	65
US Billboard Hot 100	23
US Hot R&B/Hip-Hop Songs (Billboard)	11
US Rhythmic (Billboard)	20

== Certifications ==
Region	Certification	Certified units/sales
Australia (ARIA)	2× Platinum	140,000^{‡}
Denmark (IFPI Danmark)	Platinum	90,000^{‡}
France (SNEP)	Gold	100,000^{‡}
Italy (FIMI)	Gold	25,000^{‡}
New Zealand (RMNZ)	3× Platinum	90,000^{‡}
Portugal (AFP)	Gold	5,000^{‡}
Switzerland (IFPI Switzerland)	Gold	10,000^{‡}
United Kingdom (BPI)	Platinum	600,000^{‡}
United States (RIAA)	5× Platinum	5,000,000^{‡}
^{‡} Sales+streaming figures based on certification alone.
