= Lil Mosey =

American rapper (born 2002)

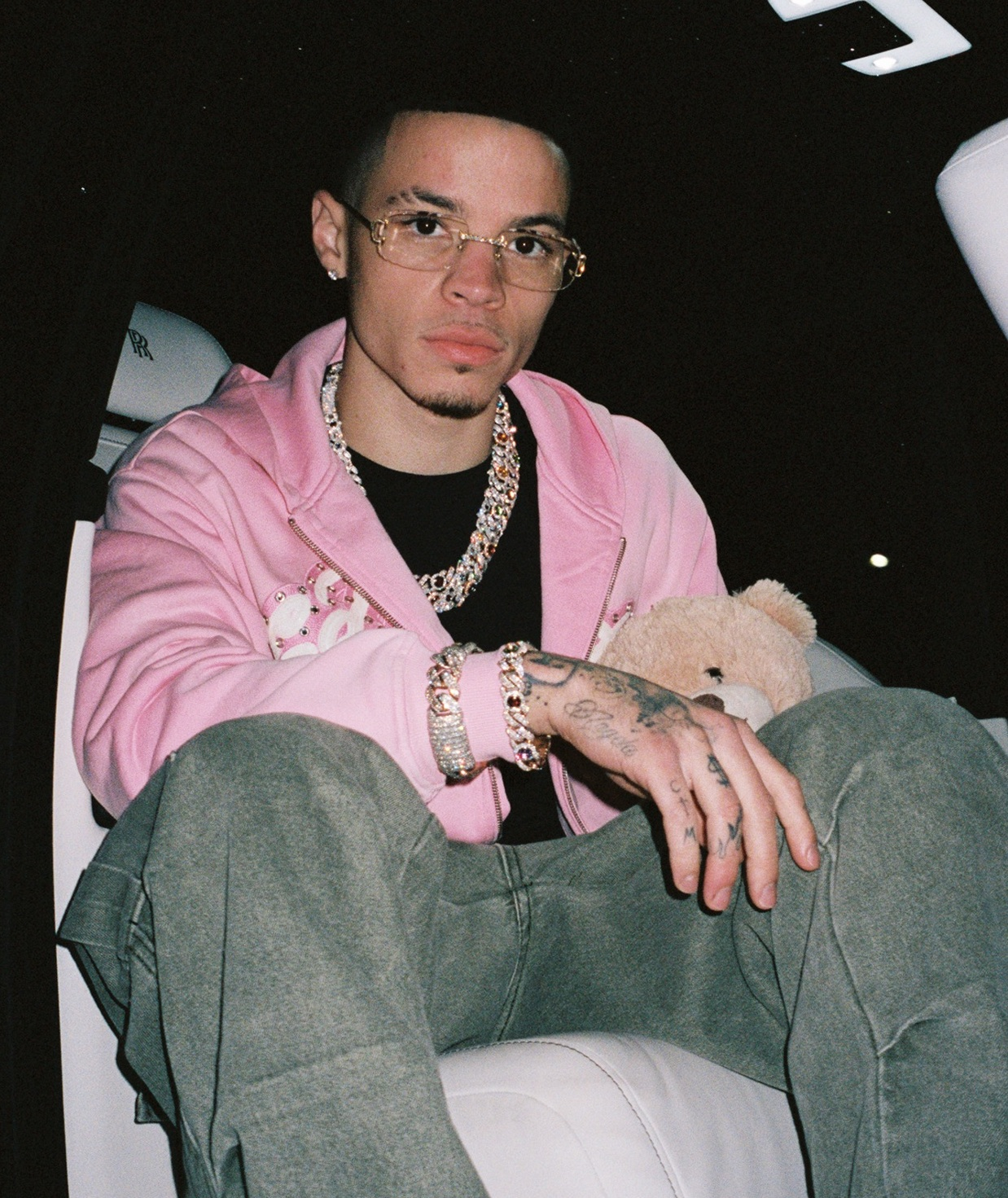
- Lil Mosey in 2024

Background information
- Born: Lathan Stanley Echols; January 25, 2002 (age 24); Seattle, Washington, U.S.
- Genres: Northwestern hip-hop; trap
- Occupations: Rapper; singer; songwriter
- Years active: 2016–present
- Labels: Love U Forever; Cinq; Interscope; Mogul Vision
- Producer(s): Royce David
- Website: lilmosey.com

Lathan Moses Stanley Echols (born January 25, 2002), known professionally as Lil Mosey, is an American rapper and singer-songwriter. His 2017 single, "Pull Up", received gold certification by the Recording Industry Association of America (RIAA) and led him to sign with Interscope Records. His 2018 single, "Noticed", became his first Billboard Hot 100 entry and preceded his debut studio album, Northsbest (2018). His second studio album, Certified Hitmaker (2019), peaked at number 12 on the Billboard 200 and spawned the single "Stuck in a Dream" (featuring Gunna). The album's 2020 re-issue spawned the single "Blueberry Faygo", which peaked at number eight on the Billboard Hot 100 and yielded Mosey's furthest commercial success.

== Early life ==
Lathan Moses Stanley Echols was born on January 25, 2002, in Seattle, Washington, to a white mother and a mixed black and Puerto Rican father. He was raised by his mother in the north end of Seattle. He began rapping in his early teens and started his music career in the eighth grade. Echols first attended Mountlake Terrace High School, then transferred to Shorecrest High School in the tenth grade. He later dropped out of school following the success of his song "Pull Up", and went on to pursue his career, heading to Los Angeles to record.

== Career ==
=== 2016–2019: Career beginnings and Northsbest, and Certified Hitmaker ===
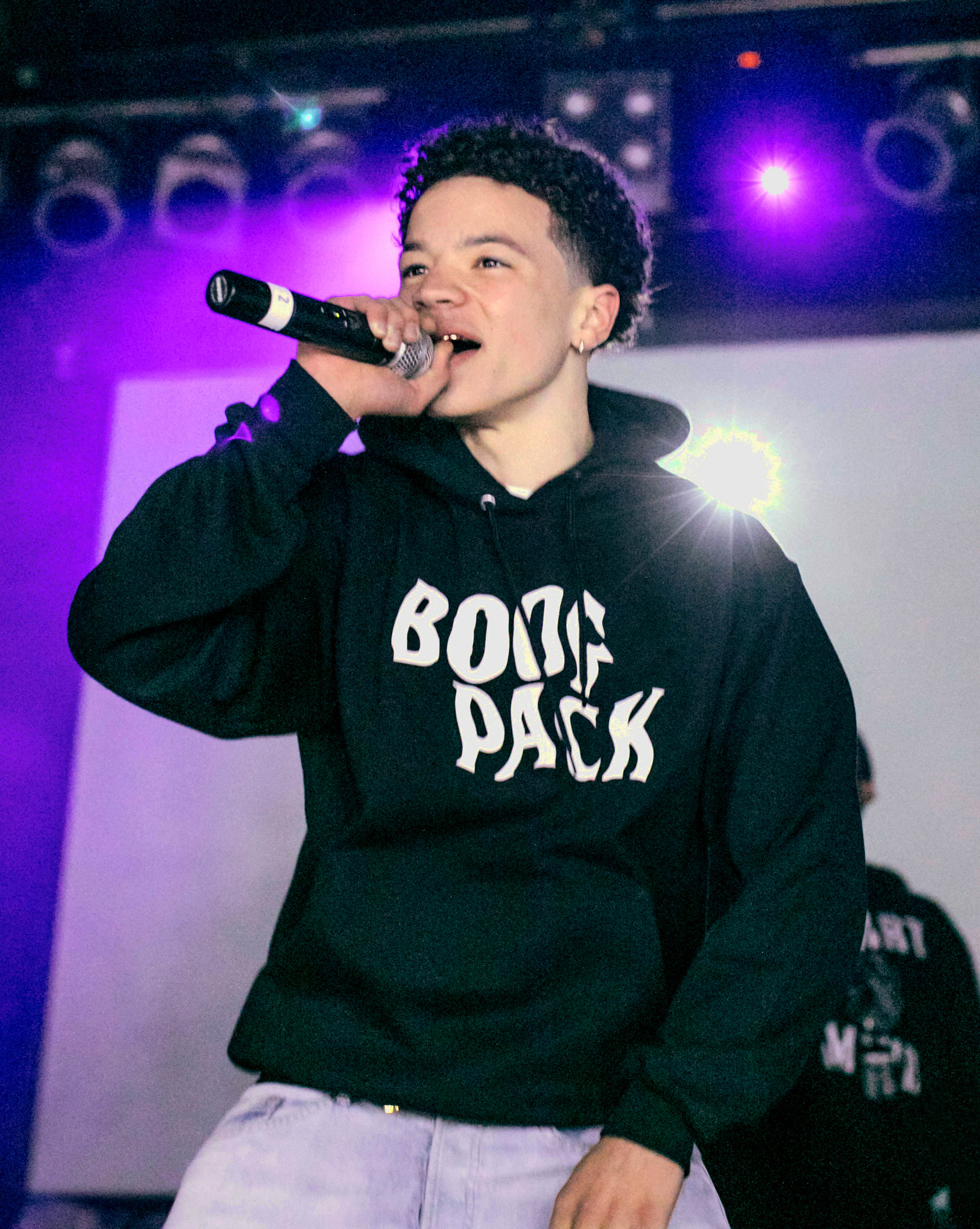
Lil Mosey in 2018

"Pull Up" was Mosey's first released track and served as his debut commercial single. Its music video reached over 25 million views on YouTube in the first 16 months upon its release. On March 14, 2018, Mosey released his second commercial single "Boof Pack". Its music video was released on the WorldStarHipHop channel, and received over 13 million views on YouTube in just over a year after its release. Around four months later, he released "Noticed" as his third commercial single alongside a music video directed by Cole Bennett. The song peaked at number 80 on the US Billboard Hot 100, while its music video has gone on to become one of the most popular videos on Lyrical Lemonade, amassing almost 290 million views to date. In the video, "Mosey and his friends live the good life as they relax in a luxury apartment, which overlooks a beautiful beach".

On October 19, 2018, Mosey released his debut studio album titled Northsbest, which includes the four previously released singles and seven other tracks.

Certified Hitmaker was released on November 8, 2019, containing the three singles and eleven other tracks.

=== 2020: Rise to mainstream popularity with "Blueberry Faygo" and feature run ===
On January 31, 2020, Mosey was featured on "Safe With Me", a song from Puerto Rican rapper Eladio Carrión's debut studio album Sauce Boyz. On February 7, 2020, Mosey released the single "Blueberry Faygo", after it garnered traction and went viral after being leaked on streaming platform Spotify throughout 2019. It later became his highest-peaking song on the Billboard Hot 100, peaking at number 8 and charting well internationally.

On June 26, Mosey released the song "Back at It", featuring fellow American rapper Lil Baby, as the first single of the deluxe edition of Certified Hitmaker. The song charted at number 9 on the US Bubbling Under the Hot 100. The deluxe's second single, "Top Gone", was released on August 5, featuring Puerto Rican rapper Lunay. The deluxe edition of Certified Hitmaker, marketed as Certified Hitmaker (AVA Leak), was released on August 14, 2020. It includes the two singles as well as three additional tracks.

On August 30, during an interview with The Hollywood Fix, Mosey teased a new project by playing a snippet of new music. The project was later announced to be a new mixtape titled Universal. The mixtape will act as a transition between Certified Hitmaker, and his upcoming third studio album: The Land of Make Believe.

=== 2021–2023: Delay of Universal and standalone releases ===
To start off 2021, Mosey was featured on the remix of "Blueberry Eyes" on January 22, the 2020 hit single by American singer MAX, which also features South Korean rapper Suga from BTS and American singer Olivia O'Brien. On January 25, 2021, his nineteenth birthday, Mosey celebrated by releasing "Holy Water", as the second single for Universal. Four days later, Mosey was featured on "Boom Boom", the fourth track on the EP Lucky 7 by American rapper Rich the Kid. On February 5, Mosey released "We Outside", a song in collaboration with fellow American rapper Smokepurpp. A week later, he released the album's third single, "Enough", which coincided with a Valentine's Day release.

Echols released the single "Flu Game" in 2023, a song that pays tribute to Michael Jordan. He followed up in 2024 with the single "Life Goes On", a song from his upcoming EP. He also signed a global distribution partnership with Cinq Music Group the same year after his release from Interscope.

=== 2024–2025: Love U Forever, Fall City and standalone releases ===
After a nearly year long hiatus, Echols released multiple standalone singles including "One Too Many" on March 21, 2024, "Life Goes On" on March 22, "Backdown Road" on March 29 and "Thug Popstar" on April 5. Echols would then release the first and only single of his third extended play titled "By Yourself" which released July 26. His extended play Love U Forever was then released August 9. Echols then went onto release single "Not You" on October 4. He then released the single "Call" on November 8, the single was dedicated to his mother who had died October 19.

Echols began 2025 by releasing single, "Anybody" on January 10.

On February 21, Echols released his single, "Call My Phone." Which was followed by "Selfish" on May 16. Echols would release the sole single, "Margiela Pink", for his fourth extended play Fall City. The single was released on September 19, 2025. Fall City would then be released a week later on September 26, sporting eight tracks. Echols went on to release "Soulja" on November 11 before ending the year with "2017" on December 9, 2025.

In 2020, Mosey opened his own record label, Certified Hitmakers. His first signee was Jae Lynx, who released his debut single "Bad Girl Vibes" under the label on November 6, 2020. On January 14, 2021, Lynx released his second single, "Regrets", with YNW BSlime. As of 2024, Jae Lynx is still the only signee to the label.

=== 2026-present: New Album rollout ===
Echols began 2026 by releasing "Every Night" on June 26. Echols stated the song would be the lead single to his new album Northsbest 2, the sequel to his 2018 debut album Northsbest. On October 9 Echols released "Lifestyle" alongside American rapper Hurricane Wisdom followed by "Mercer Hotel" on October 23 and "Bad Habits" on November 13, in which he teased the album is on the way.

== Musical style ==
Lil Mosey is known for his melodic flow and lyrics. When asked if the term "mumble rap" applies to him in an interview with Complex, Lil Mosey says "I wouldn't consider myself a mumble rapper, because I don't know what that is. But when I talk, I mumble." Although, Lil Mosey does not consider his sound to be similar to Meek Mill's, he does consider the rapper an influence as in an interview with XXL Magazine, he describes how he would always listen to Meek Mill's song "Dreams and Nightmares" when he was younger. When asked in the same interview about what comparisons he has drawn, Mosey responded "Music-wise, they be comparing me to Drake".

== Personal life ==
On April 2, 2021, Echols was charged with one count of second-degree rape in Lewis County, Washington, for allegedly engaging in sexual intercourse with an individual that was incapable of giving consent. He pled not guilty and passed two polygraph tests that were not admissible in court. Echols was tried in a joint trial alongside co-defendants Francisco P. Prater and Joshua D. Darrow. The trial began in February 2023 and in March 2023 he was found not guilty.

== Discography ==
=== Studio albums ===
Title	Album details	Peak chart positions										Certifications
Title	Album details	US	US R&B/HH	AUS	CAN	DEN	FRA	IRE	NOR	SWE	UK	Certifications
Northsbest	Released: October 19, 2018; Label: Mogul Vision, Interscope; Formats: CD, LP, digital download, streaming	29	17	—	20	35	—	—	16	26	—	RIAA: Gold; RMNZ: Gold
Certified Hitmaker	Released: November 8, 2019; Label: Mogul Vision, Interscope; Formats: CD, LP, digital download, streaming	12	9	91	8	—	184	92	15	45	67	RIAA: Platinum; RMNZ: Gold

=== Extended plays ===
Title	EP details
Uni	Released: October 19, 2022; Label: Mogul Vision, Interscope; Formats: Digital download, streaming
Ver	Released: November 29, 2022; Label: Mogul Vision, Interscope; Formats: Digital download, streaming
Love U Forever	Released: August 9, 2024; Label: Love U Forever, Cinq; Formats: Digital download, streaming
Fall City	Released: September 26, 2025; Label: Love U Forever, Cinq; Formats: Digital download, streaming

=== Mixtapes ===
Title	Mixtape details
NorthsBest	Released: April 7, 2017; Label: Self-released; Formats: Digital download, streaming

=== Singles ===
Title	Year	Peak chart positions										Certifications	Album
Title	Year	US	US R&B/HH	AUS	CAN	CZE	IRE	NZ	POR	SWE Heat.	UK	Certifications	Album
"Pull Up"	2017	—	—	—	—	—	—	—	—	—	—	RIAA: Gold	Northsbest
"Boof Pack"	2018	—	—	—	—	—	—	—	—	—	—		Northsbest
"Noticed"	2018	80	37	—	50	81	67	— (Note: "Noticed" did not chart on the NZ Top 40 Singles chart, but did peak at number 33 on the NZ Hot Singles chart.)	67	1	—	RIAA: 3× Platinum; BPI: Gold; RMNZ: Platinum	Northsbest
"Yoppa" (with BlocBoy JB)	2018	—	—	—	—	—	—	—	—	—	—		Northsbest
"K For Christmas"	2018	—	—	—	—	—	—	—	—	—	—		Non-album single
"Bust Down Cartier"	2019	—	—	—	—	—	—	— (Note: "Bust Down Cartier" did not enter the NZ Top 40 Singles Chart, but peaked at number 31 on the NZ Hot Singles Chart.)	—	—	—		Northsbest (Extended)
"G Walk" (with Chris Brown)	2019	—	—	—	—	—	—	— (Note: "G Walk" did not enter the NZ Top 40 Singles Chart, but peaked at number 24 on the NZ Hot Singles Chart.)	—	—	—	RIAA: Gold	Certified Hitmaker
"Stuck in a Dream" (featuring Gunna)	2019	62	30	92	34	—	82	— (Note: "Stuck in a Dream" did not enter the NZ Top 40 Singles Chart, but peaked at number 27 on the NZ Hot Singles Chart.)	93	6	83	RIAA: 2× Platinum; BPI: Silver; RMNZ: Gold	Certified Hitmaker
"Live This Wild"	2019	—	—	—	80	—	—	— (Note: "Live This Wild" did not enter the NZ Top 40 Singles Chart, but peaked at number 31 on the NZ Hot Singles Chart.)	—	—	—	RIAA: Gold	Certified Hitmaker
"Blueberry Faygo"	2020	8	6	16	8	16	4	10	9	1	9	RIAA: 6× Platinum; ARIA: Platinum; BPI: Platinum; MC: 4× Platinum; RMNZ: 3× Platinum	Certified Hitmaker
"Only the Team" (with Rvssian and Lil Tjay)	2020	—	—	—	—	—	—	—	—	—	—		Non-album singles
"Vicious" (with Tate McRae)	2020	—	—	—	—	—	—	— (Note: "Vicious" did not enter the NZ Top 40 Singles Chart, but peaked at number 35 on the NZ Hot Singles Chart.)	—	—	—		Non-album singles
"Back at It" (featuring Lil Baby)	2020	— (Note: "Back at It" did not chart on the Hot 100, but did peak at number nine on the Bubbling Under Hot 100 chart.)	—	—	—	—	—	— (Note: "Back at It" did not enter the NZ Top 40 Singles Chart, but peaked at number 19 on the NZ Hot Singles Chart.)	—	—	—		Certified Hitmaker (Deluxe)
"Past Life" (Remix) (with Trevor Daniel and Selena Gomez)	2020	—	—	—	—	—	—	—	—	—	—		Non-album single
"Top Gone" (with Lunay)	2020	—	—	—	—	—	—	—	—	—	—		Certified Hitmaker (Deluxe)
"Krabby Step" (with Swae Lee and Tyga)	2020	—	—	—	—	—	—	—	—	—	—		Sponge on the Run
"Jumpin Out the Face"	2020	—	—	—	—	—	—	—	—	—	—		Non-album singles
"Holy Water"	2021	—	—	—	—	—	—	— (Note: "Holy Water" did not enter the NZ Top 40 Singles Chart, but peaked at number 28 on the NZ Hot Singles Chart.)	—	—	—		Non-album singles
"Enough"	2021	—	—	—	—	—	—	— (Note: "Enough" did not enter the NZ Top 40 Singles Chart, but peaked at number 32 on the NZ Hot Singles Chart.)	—	—	—		Non-album singles
"Try Me"	2021	– (Note: "Try Me" did not chart on the Hot 100, but did peak at number 25 on the Rhythmic Airplay chart.)	—	—	—	—	—	— (Note: "Try Me" did not enter the NZ Top 40 Singles Chart, but peaked at number 37 on the NZ Hot Singles Chart.)	—	—	—		Non-album singles
"Jetski" (with Internet Money and Lil Tecca)	2021	— (Note: "Jetski" did not chart on the Hot 100, but did peak at number 19 on the Bubbling Under Hot 100 chart.)	—	—	88	—	—	— (Note: "Jetski" did not enter the NZ Top 40 Singles Chart, but peaked at number 16 on the NZ Hot Singles Chart.)	—	—	—		Non-album singles
"Pass Out" (with Ava MakeBelieve)	2021	—	—	—	—	—	—	—	—	—	—		Non-album singles
"Not The Same God As Mine"	2021	—	—	—	—	—	—	—	—	—	—		Non-album singles
"Ain't It A Flex"	2022	—	—	—	—	—	—	—	—	—	—		Non-album singles
"Falling"	2022	—	—	—	—	—	—	—	—	—	—		Non-album singles
"Breathin Again"	2022	—	—	—	—	—	—	—	—	—	—		Non-album singles
"Flu Game"	2023	—	—	—	—	—	—	—	—	—	—		Non-album singles
"One Too Many"	2024	—	—	—	—	—	—	—	—	—	—		Non-album singles
"Life Goes On"	2024	—	—	—	—	—	—	—	—	—	—		Non-album singles
"Back Down Road"	2024	—	—	—	—	—	—	—	—	—	—		Non-album singles
"Thug Popstar"	2024	—	—	—	—	—	—	—	—	—	—		Non-album singles
"By Yourself"	2024	—	—	—	—	—	—	—	—	—	—		Love U Forever
"Not You"	2024	—	—	—	—	—	—	—	—	—	—		Non-album singles
"Call"	2024	—	—	—	—	—	—	—	—	—	—		Non-album singles
"Pull Up" (with MC PH and Jd On Tha Track)	2024	—	—	—	—	—	—	—	—	—	—		Bem-Vindo Ao Meu Mundo
"Anybody"	2025	—	—	—	—	—	—	—	—	—	—		Non-album singles
"Call My Phone"	2025	—	—	—	—	—	—	—	—	—	—		Non-album singles
"Selfish"	2025	—	—	—	—	—	—	—	—	—	—		Non-album singles
"Margiela Pink"	2025	—	—	—	—	—	—	—	—	—	—		Fall City
"Soulja"	2025	—	—	—	—	—	—	—	—	—	—		Non-album singles
"2017"	2025	—	—	—	—	—	—	—	—	—	—		Non-album singles
"Every Night"	2026	—	—	—	—	—	—	—	—	—	—		TBA
"Lifestyle" (with Hurricane Wisdom)	2026	—	—	—	—	—	—	—	—	—	—		TBA
"Mercer Hotel"	2026	—	—	—	—	—	—	—	—	—	—		TBA
"Bad Habits"	2026	—	—	—	—	—	—	—	—	—	—		TBA
"—" denotes a recording that did not chart or was not released in that territory.

==== As featured artist ====
Title	Year	Album
"Kickback" (Pimp Tobi featuring Lil Mosey)	2018	Non-album singles
"Kill Tek Piece" (Warhol.SS featuring Lil Mosey)	2019	Non-album singles
"Super Soaker" (Bandkidjay featuring Lil Mosey)	2020	Non-album singles
"Banana" (28AV featuring Lil Mosey & Souf Souf)	2020	Czarleo
"We Outside" (Smokepurpp featuring Lil Mosey)	2021	Psycho (Legally Insane)
"Bipolar" (Lit Killah featuring Lil Mosey)	2022	SnipeZ
"Bounce Bacc" (Lewie featuring Lil Mosey)	2022	Non-album singles
"Throw It Back" (Lil Elite featuring Lil Mosey)	2023	Non-album singles
"Leave Me Alone" (KnowKnow featuring Lil Mosey)	2024	Non-album singles
"Paseo De La Fama" (Ysrael Barajas featuring Lil Mosey)	2026	Metanoia

=== Other charted and certified songs ===
Title	Year	Peak chart positions						Cerfitications	Album
Title	Year	US	US R&B/HH	AUS	CAN	IRE	NZ Hot	Cerfitications	Album
"Kamikaze"	2018	97	47	—	89	—	—	RIAA: Platinum; RMNZ: Gold	Northsbest
"Burberry Headband"	2018	—	—	—	—	—	—	RIAA: Gold	Northsbest
"Greet Her"	2018	—	—	—	—	—	—	RIAA: Gold	Northsbest
"So Fast"	2019	—	—	—	—	—	37		Certified Hitmaker
"Wrong" (The Kid Laroi featuring Lil Mosey)	2020	— (Note: "Wrong" did not chart on the Hot 100, but did peak at number nine on the Bubbling Under Hot 100 chart.)	—	58	98	90	6	RIAA: Platinum; ARIA: Platinum; MC: Platinum; RMNZ: Gold	F*ck Love
"—" denotes a recording that did not chart or was not released in that territory.

=== Guest appearances ===
List of non-single guest appearances, with other performing artists
Title	Year	Other artist(s)	Album
"This Ain't That"	2019	Trippie Redd	A Love Letter to You 4
"Safe With Me"	2020	Eladio Carrión	Sauce Boyz
"Wrong"	2020	The Kid Laroi	F*ck Love
"Lost Me"	2020	Internet Money, Lil Skies, Iann Dior	B4 The Storm
"Addicted"	2020	Mook TBG	Death Chamber 2
"Be Happy (Remix)"	2020	Dixie D'Amelio, blackbear	Non-album remix
"Thug Kry"	2020	YG, Calboy	My Life 4Hunnid
"Lets Link (Remix)"	2020	WhosHeem, Tyga	Non-album remix
"No Honourable Mention"	2020	Trippie Redd, Quavo	Pegasus (Note: Also appears on Pegasus (Spooky Sounds Edition) and Pegasus: Neon Shark vs Pegasus Presented by Travis Barker)
"Gangang"	2020	Sfera Ebbasta	Famoso
"Fullys for Bullies"	2020	Drakeo the Ruler, Ralfy The Plug	We Know The Truth
"Fuck 69"	2020	Drakeo The Ruler, Ketchy The Great	We Know The Truth
"How We Doin It"	2020	French Montana	CB5
"Bussin Out"	2020	DJ Scheme, Ty Dolla $ign	Family
"Out The Mud"	2020	Hotboii	Double O Baby
"Enjoy Every Dolla"	2020	JackBoy	Love Me While I'm Here
"Blueberry Eyes (Remix)"	2021	MAX, SUGA, Olivia O'Brien	Colour Vision (Deluxe)
"Boom Boom"	2021	Rich The Kid	Lucky 7
"Gracias A Dios"	2022	Natanael Cano	NataKong
"Baby Boy"	2022	28AV	Underdog Turnt Legend
"2 Tone"	2022	28AV	Underdog Turnt Legend
"Be Honest"	2023	Jae Lynx	Learning To Fly
"龙舌兰日出 (Tequila Sunrise)"	2024	Capper	P.I.G
"Neat Party"	2024	Houdini	Hou I'm Meant To Be
"OXIGÊNIO"	2025	Wiu	808 Club
