= Yoppa (song) =

Song by Lil Mosey and BlocBoy JB

Single by Lil Mosey and BlocBoy JB

from the album Northsbest
- Released: October 4, 2018
- Genre: Hip hop; trap
- Length: 2:43
- Label: Mogul Vision; Interscope
- Songwriters: Lathan Echols; James Baker; Royce Pearson
- Producer: Royce David

Lil Mosey singles chronology
"Noticed" (2018)	"Yoppa" (2018)	"K For Christmas" (2018)

BlocBoy JB singles chronology
"Let It Go" (2018)	"Yoppa" (2018)	"Don't Say That" (2018)

Music video
- "Yoppa" on YouTube

"Yoppa" is a song recorded by American rappers Lil Mosey and BlocBoy JB, released on October 4, 2018, as the fourth single from Mosey's debut studio album Northsbest. The song was produced by Royce David, who has produced most of his songs. "Yoppa" is the only song on Northsbest featuring a guest appearance.

== Composition ==
The song was described as having an "upbeat melody paired with smooth beats as the two (Lil Mosey and BlocBoy JB) effortlessly breeze through lyrics." The rappers talk about their luxurious and confident lifestyles and how "ill-advised it be to step to them, lest they face the repercussions."

== Music video ==
The official music video was uploaded to Lil Mosey's Vevo channel on YouTube on January 29, 2019 and was directed by RaheemisBlind. In it, Mosey and BlocBoy appear as employees of a mattresses store named Northsbest Mattresses. After getting lambasted by their boss, Mosey and BlocBoy convert the place into a trap house, in which some individuals later entered carrying briefcases consisting of what was initially believed to be weapons. They were later revealed to be water guns. Mosey and BlocBoy then continue to celebrate by making it rain in the store.

== Critical reception ==
The song received generally positive reviews. Emina Lukarcanin of Billboard called the track "lyrical". Kevin Goddard of HotNewHipHop called the track "bouncy".
