= Bad Company (ASAP Rocky song) =

2018 single by ASAP Rocky featuring BlocBoy JB

Single by ASAP Rocky featuring BlocBoy JB
- Released: March 27, 2018
- Length: 3:03
- Label: ASAP Worldwide; Polo Grounds; RCA
- Songwriters: Rakim Mayers; James Baker; Jameel Bruner; Ricci Riera; Hector Delgado; Isaac de Boni; Michael Mule; Rory Quigley
- Producers: Kintaro; Riera

ASAP Rocky singles chronology
| "Cocky" (2018) | "Bad Company" (2018) | "ASAP Forever" (2018) |

BlocBoy JB singles chronology
| "Rover 2.0" (2018) | "Bad Company" (2018) | "Prod by Bloc" (2018) |

"Bad Company" is a single by American rapper ASAP Rocky featuring American rapper BlocBoy JB. It was released on March 27, 2018 and produced by Kintaro and Ricci Riera.

== Composition and lyrics ==
The song has an up-tempo beat and finds the rappers taking aim at their enemies. Through a "slightly auto-tuned drawl", ASAP Rocky raps about the problems related to his paranoia and feuds, including losing sleep. BlocBoy JB performs after Rocky's first verse without a chorus in between and adds some "Southern bounce" to the song, rapping about his jewelry and gunning down his enemies.

== Critical reception ==
Aron A. of HotNewHipHop praised the song, writing "The funky bassline and the flow from both rappers deliver some much needed jiggyness."

== Charts ==
| Chart (2018) | Peak position |
|---|---|
| Canada Hot 100 (Billboard) | 68 |
| US Bubbling Under Hot 100 (Billboard) | 1 |
| US Hot R&B/Hip-Hop Songs (Billboard) | 47 |

== Certifications ==
| Region | Certification | Certified units/sales |
|---|---|---|
| United States (RIAA) | Gold | 500,000^{‡} |
^{‡} Sales+streaming figures based on certification alone.
