= Northsbest =

Studio album by Lil Mosey
- Released: October 19, 2018
- Recorded: 2017–2018
- Genre: Hip hop; pop rap; trap
- Length: 28:16
- Label: Mogul Vision; Interscope
- Producer: BlackMayo; Dez Wright; Kid Culture; Lil Mosey; Royce David

Lil Mosey chronology
NorthsBest (2017)	Northsbest (2018)	Lil Mosey (2019)

Singles from Northsbest
- 1. "Pull Up" Released: December 7, 2017; 2. "Boof Pack" Released: May 4, 2018; 3. "Noticed" Released: July 20, 2018; 4. "Yoppa" Released: October 4, 2018; 5. "Bust Down Cartier" Released: March 15, 2019

Northsbest is the debut studio album by American rapper Lil Mosey. It was released on October 19, 2018, by Mogul Vision Music and Interscope Records. It is his major label debut, and shares the same name as his 2017 mixtape NorthsBest. (Note: HipHopDX has also referred to this release as a mixtape.) The album was preceded by four singles: "Pull Up", "Boof Pack", "Noticed" and "Yoppa". All eleven tracks were produced by Royce David except for "Pull Up", while "Yoppa" is the only song containing a guest appearance, with BlocBoy JB appearing on the track.

== Background ==
On August 9, 2018, in an interview with XXL, it was revealed that Lil Mosey was working on a studio album that served as the successor to his 2017 mixtape of the same name, slated for release in Fall 2018.

== Critical reception ==
Professional ratings
Review scores
Source	Rating
HotNewHipHop	87%

Northsbest received generally positive reviews from critics. At the music website HotNewHipHop, the album received an average score of 4.3 out of 5 stars (87%), based on 23 reviews.

== Track listing ==
All tracks produced by Royce David, except where noted. Credits adapted from Tidal.

No.	Title	Writer(s)	Producer(s)	Length
1.	"Kamikaze"	Lathan Echols; Royce Pearson; Daniel Hackett; Claudio Cueni; Christopher Strokes	Royce David; Kid Culture	2:19
2.	"Fu Shit"	Echols; Pearson		2:38
3.	"Noticed"	Echols; Pearson; Cody Collick		2:45
4.	"Rarri"	Echols; Pearson		1:45
5.	"Pull Up"	Echols; Kevin Essett	BlackMayo	3:03
6.	"Burberry Headband"	Echols; Pearson		2:26
7.	"Greet Her"	Echols; Pearson; Johntá Austin; Andre Harris; Vidal Davis		2:54
8.	"That’s My Bitch"	Echols; Pearson		3:04
9.	"Yoppa" (with BlocBoy JB)	Echols; Pearson; James Baker		2:43
10.	"Boof Pack"	Echols; Pearson; Dylan Cleary-Krell	Royce David; Dez Wright	2:15
11.	"Trapstar"	Echols; Pearson		2:24
Total length:				28:16

Extended edition
No.	Title	Writer(s)	Producer(s)	Length
12.	"Bust Down Cartier"	Echols	Lil Mosey	2:28
Total length:				30:46

Notes

- "Kamikaze" is known as "Kamakaze" on the clean version of the album.
- "Greet Her" contains sampled elements from "Yo (Excuse Me Miss)" by Chris Brown.

== Charts ==
=== Weekly charts ===
Chart (2018–2019)	Peak position
Belgian Albums (Ultratop Flanders)	167
Canadian Albums (Billboard)	20
Danish Albums (Hitlisten)	35
Dutch Albums (Album Top 100)	47
Norwegian Albums (VG-lista)	16
Swedish Albums (Sverigetopplistan)	26
US Billboard 200	29
US Top R&B/Hip-Hop Albums (Billboard)	17

=== Year-end charts ===
Chart (2019)	Position
US Billboard 200	181

== Certifications ==
Region	Certification	Certified units/sales
Denmark (IFPI Danmark)	Gold	10,000^{‡}
New Zealand (RMNZ)	Gold	7,500^{‡}
United States (RIAA)	Gold	500,000^{‡}
^{‡} Sales+streaming figures based on certification alone.
