= Royce David =

American record producer

- Also known as: Aye Royce
- Born: Royce David Pearson; February 10, 1999 (age 27); Seattle, Washington, U.S.
- Genre: Trap
- Occupations: Record producer; songwriter; disc jockey
- Years active: 2016–present
- Labels: Sony/ATV; OSiXX
- Website: roycedavid.com

Royce David Pearson (born February 10, 1999) is an American record producer and DJ. David is known for producing several songs for fellow Seattle native Lil Mosey's singles "Noticed", "Kamikaze", and "Stuck in a Dream", each of which entered the US Billboard Hot 100.

He has collaborated with and produced singles for multiple rappers including BlocBoy JB, Chris Brown, Gunna, and Trippie Redd. "Noticed" topped the Swedish national record chart, Sverigetopplistan, in October 2018.

== Early life and career ==
Royce David Pearson was born on February 10, 1999, in Seattle, Washington. He grew up in the north end of Seattle. He attended and graduated from Lakeside School. He began his music career making music alongside fellow rapper Lil Mosey in 2016 as the two started working together In 2018, David produced Mosey's debut studio album, Northsbest. The album was awarded with RIAA Gold certification and peaked at 29 on the US Billboard 200. In 2019, David produced Certified Hitmaker by Lil Mosey featuring Chris Brown, Trippie Redd, Gunna, and AJ Tracey. The album peaked at twelfth position on the US Billboard 200.

Due to their longtime collaboration, David has been recognized as the key element to Mosey's sound. He is also noted for his producer tag, "Aye Royce, you did it right here!"

== Production discography ==
=== Singles ===
Title	Year	Peak chart positions										Certifications	Album
Title	Year	US	US R&B/HH	AUS	CAN	CZE	IRE	NZ	POR	SWE Heat.	UK	Certifications	Album
"Noticed" (Lil Mosey)	2018	80	37	–	50	81	67	33	67	1	–	• RIAA: 2× Platinum	Northsbest
"Kamikaze" (Lil Mosey)	2018	97	47	–	89	–	–	–	–	–	–	• RIAA: Platinum	Northsbest
"Burberry Headband" (Lil Mosey)	2018	–	–	–	–	–	–	–	–	–	–	• RIAA: Gold	Northsbest
"Greet Her" (Lil Mosey)	2018	–	–	–	–	–	–	–	–	–	–	• RIAA: Gold	Northsbest
"So Fast" (Lil Mosey)	2019	–	–	–	–	–	–	37	–	–	–		Certified Hitmaker
"Stuck in a Dream" (Lil Mosey featuring Gunna)	2019	62	30	92	34	–	82	–	–	6	83	• RIAA: Platinum	Certified Hitmaker
"Live This Wild" (Lil Mosey)	2019	–	–	–	80	–	–	–	–	–	–		Certified Hitmaker

== Production credits ==
=== 2017 ===
Nathan Nzanga – Trixie

- 01. "Trixie"

=== 2018 ===
Nathan Nzanga – Welcome To Naytropolis!!!

- 03. "1st Gen"

Lil Mosey – Northsbest

- 01. "Kamikaze"
- 02. "Fu Shit"
- 03. "Noticed"
- 04. "Rarri"
- 06. "Burberry Headband"
- 07. "Greet Her"
- 08. "That's My Bitch"
- 09. "Yoppa (featuring Blocboy JB)"
- 10. "Boof Pack"
- 11. "Trapstar"
- 12. "Bust Down Cartier"

Lil Mosey

- 00. "K For Christmas"

=== 2019 ===
Lil Mosey – Certified Hitmaker

- 02. "Stuck In A Dream (featuring Gunna)"
- 03. "Live This Wild"
- 04. "So Fast"
- 05. "Rose Gold"
- 06. "Never Scared (featuring Trippie Redd)"
- 07. "Bankroll (featuring AJ Tracey)"
- 08. "Speed Racin"
- 09. "Jet To The West"
- 10. "See My Baby"
- 11. "Dreamin"
- 12. "Rockstars"
- 13. "Space Coupe"
- 14. "G Walk (featuring Chris Brown)"
- 15. "Kari's World"
