= Simi (mixtape) =

Mixtape by BlocBoy JB
- Released: May 4, 2018
- Recorded: 2017–18
- Genre: Hip hop; trap
- Length: 48:24
- Label: Bloc Nation
- Producer: ATL Jacob; Ben Billions; ChaseTheMoney; Deko; Dmac; Infamous; OG Parker; Richie Souf; Tay Keith; Tee Romano

BlocBoy JB chronology
The Purple M&M (2017)	Simi (2018)	Don't Think That (2018)

Singles from Simi
- 1. "Look Alive" Released: February 9, 2018; 2. "Rover 2.0" Released: March 23, 2018

Simi (stylized in all caps) is the seventh mixtape by American rapper BlocBoy JB. It was released by his label Bloc Nation on May 4, 2018. The mixtape features guest appearances from Drake, Lil Pump, Moneybagg Yo, 21 Savage, and YG. The mixtape was supported by two singles: "Look Alive" featuring Drake and "Rover 2.0" featuring 21 Savage, and one promotional single, "Nun of Dat" featuring Lil Pump.

== Promotion ==
=== Singles ===
The mixtape's lead single, "Look Alive", was released for digital download on February 9, 2018, after the release of the Fredrick Ali-directed music video on February 8, 2018. The song was produced by Tay Keith. The song peaked at number five on the Billboard Hot 100.

The mixtape's second single, "Rover 2.0" featuring 21 Savage, was released on March 23, 2018, along with the Fredrick Ali-directed music video. The song was produced by Tay Keith.

=== Promotional singles ===
The mixtape's lead promotional single, "Nun of Dat" featuring Lil Pump, was released on May 2, 2018. The song was produced by Tay Keith.

== Critical reception ==
The mixtape received generally positive reviews. Paul A. Thompson of Pitchfork called the mixtape "honest, clear, and incredibly fun". He also said the tape was "beautifully executed", noting "Good Day" and "No Chorus, Pt. 11" as standout tracks on the project. Israel Daramola of Spin said that BlocBoy "captured his electric persona" on the mixtape. On a slightly less positive note, Marcus Blackwell of HipHopDX said that BlocBoy's charisma "carried" the mixtape, but that he had "limited mic skills".

In a mixed review, Andre Gee of Uproxx said that although BlocBoy "showed that he has considerable room for growth", but called the mixtape "unmemorable".

== Commercial performance ==
Simi debuted at number 28 on the Billboard 200 on the week ending May 19, 2018.

== Track listing ==
No.	Title	Writer(s)	Producer(s)	Length
1.	"Turnt Up"	James Baker; Brytavious Chambers	Tay Keith	2:58
2.	"Look Alive" (featuring Drake)	Baker; Aubrey Graham; Chambers	Tay Keith	3:02
3.	"Nun of Dat" (featuring Lil Pump)	Baker; Gazzy Garcia; Chambers	Tay Keith	4:00
4.	"Good Day"	Baker; Tony Son	Richie Souf	1:39
5.	"Left Hand"	Baker; Jarven Harris	Track Gordy	1:41
6.	"Asian Bitch" (featuring Moneybagg Yo)	Baker; Demario White Jr.; Chase Rose	ChaseTheMoney	2:33
7.	"Rover 2.0" (featuring 21 Savage)	Baker; Shayaa Abraham-Joseph; Chambers	Tay Keith	4:35
8.	"Shoot"	Baker; Chambers	Tay Keith	3:09
9.	"Wait"	Baker; Chambers	Tay Keith	1:57
10.	"Nike Swoosh" (featuring YG)	Baker; Keenon Jackson; Chambers	Tay Keith	2:31
11.	"Mamacita"	Baker; Joshua Parker; Grant Decouto; Terence Williams	OG Parker; Deko; Tee Romano	1:32
12.	"Mexico"	Baker; Benjamin Diehl	Ben Billions	1:43
13.	"No Velcro"	Baker; Diehl; Marco Rodriguez-Diaz	Ben Billions; Infamous	3:06
14.	"Left Right"	Baker	Dmac	2:24
15.	"No Chorus, Pt. 11"	Baker; Chambers	Tay Keith	3:18
16.	"Straight Drop"	Baker; Jacob Canady	ATL Jacob	2:22
17.	"Feature"	Baker	Denaro Love	2:59
18.	"Outro"	Baker; Chambers	Tay Keith	3:36
Total length:				48:24

== Charts ==
=== Weekly charts ===
Chart (2018)	Peak position
Canadian Albums (Billboard)	35
US Billboard 200	28
US Top R&B/Hip-Hop Albums (Billboard)	16

=== Year-end charts ===
Chart (2018)	Position
US Billboard 200	194
US Top R&B/Hip-Hop Albums (Billboard)	82
