= BlocBoy JB =

American rapper (born 1996)

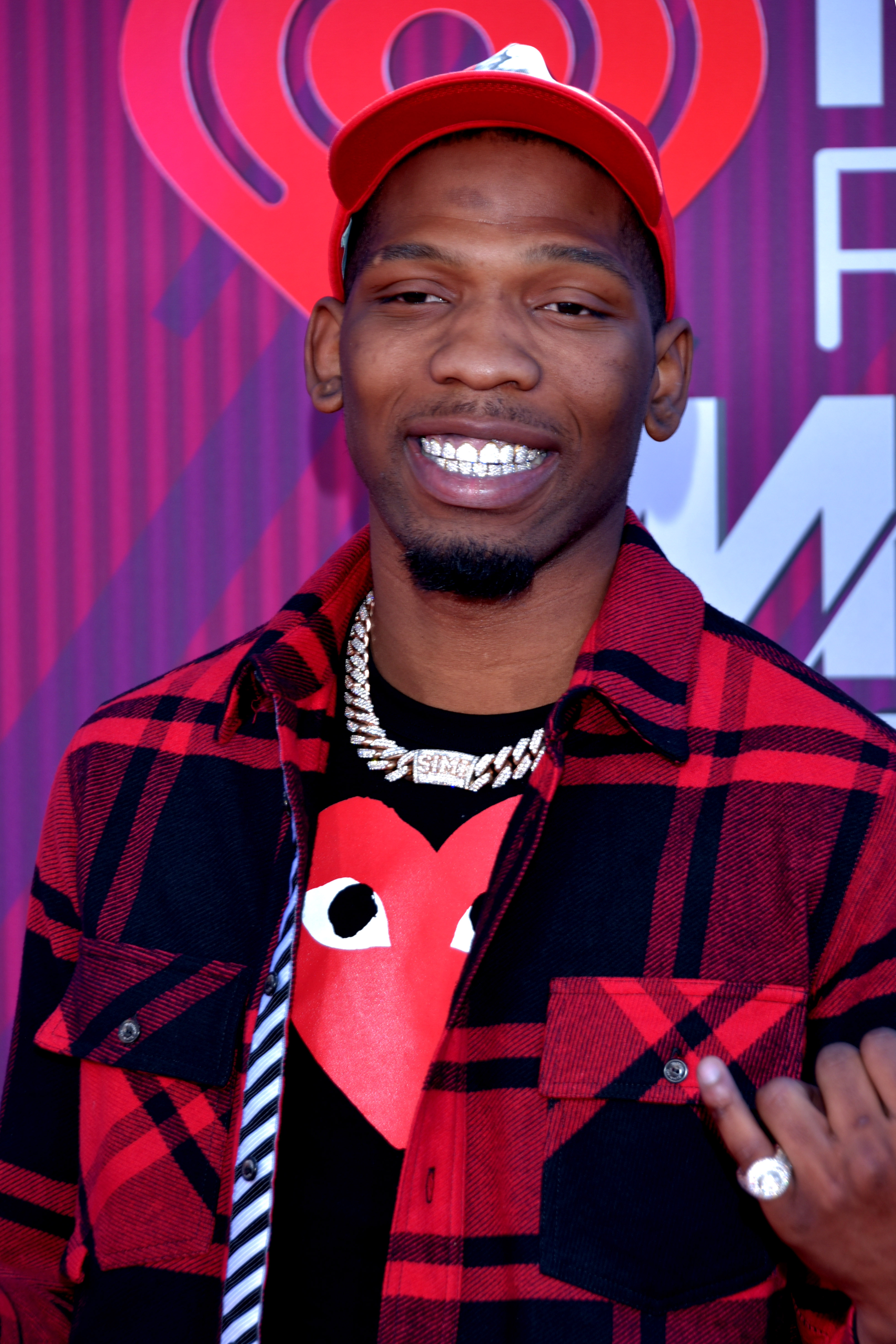
- BlocBoy JB at the 2019 iHeartRadio Music Awards

Background information
- Born: James Lee Baker; May 19, 1996 (age 30); Memphis, Tennessee, U.S.
- Genres: Memphis rap; trap
- Occupations: Rapper; songwriter
- Years active: 2012–present
- Labels: Bloc Nation; Foundation; Interscope
- Children: 1
- Website: blocboy.com
- Website: blockboy.com

James Lee Baker (born May 19, 1996), known professionally as BlocBoy JB, is an American rapper from Memphis, Tennessee. Baker is best known for his 2018 single "Look Alive" (featuring Drake), which peaked at number five on the Billboard Hot 100. Its follow-up, "Rover" (remixed featuring 21 Savage), entered the Bubbling Under Hot 100 chart, while both preceded the release of his seventh mixtape, Simi (2018). He signed with Interscope Records in August of that year. His debut studio album, FatBoy (2020) was released two years later and failed to chart.

== Early life ==
James Baker was born on May 19, 1996, in Memphis, Tennessee, and was mostly raised in Binghampton, Memphis. His name comes from his father. In 2008, when Baker was 12, his father broke out of prison and traveled to Baker's home to see him for a short period of time. At the age of 14, Baker became affiliated with the Grape Street Watts Crips. Although located in Los Angeles, the gang has an affiliated branch in Memphis called the Peda Roll Mafia. Baker's affiliation is mentioned throughout many of his songs, including "Rover". Baker served a month in prison in 2012 for committing a home invasion, and served the rest of his sentence on house arrest. Baker has said the invasion was "sloppy", and that they performed the invasion with no masks and a BB gun.

Baker began making music when he was fourteen when he moved to Raleigh in North Memphis and met Tay Keith (who later produced "Look Alive"), and the two began making music shortly afterwards.

== Career ==
=== 2012–2016: Early music ===
Baker started uploading music on his SoundCloud page in 2012. In 2016, he released his debut mixtape, Who Am I. It featured the track "No Chorus Pt. 6", which reached more than three million views on YouTube.

=== 2017–2018: Shoot dance, Billboard top 10, and XXL ===
The next summer, he released the song "Shoot", which spawned a dance craze called the "shoot dance". Another single, "Rover", followed in early 2018. The viral hits attracted the attention of Canadian rapper Drake who it was speculated was going to remix "Rover" though it resulted in the pair collaborating on a song titled, "Look Alive", which was released in February 2018 and debuted at number six on the Billboard Hot 100 chart.

Following the release of "Look Alive", Baker spurred rumors he would soon sign to Drake's label OVO Sound, saying "Somewhat. I'm trying to see what's my move." He was also featured on Moneybagg Yo's 2 Heartless project. On March 23, 2018, Baker released "Rover 2.0", a remix of "Rover", featuring rapper 21 Savage. The song was Baker's second lead song to chart on a Billboard chart, peaking at number two on the Bubbling Under Hot 100 singles. He was also featured on ASAP Rocky's "Bad Company" and No Jumper's "Hard" with Tay-K.

After releasing the single, "Prod by Bloc", he announced the mixtape Simi, while also revealing the tracklist which featured Lil Pump, YG, Drake and 21 Savage. Baker was named as one of the members of XXL's "2018 Freshman Class" on June 12, 2018.

On October 30, 2018, Baker released his debut extended play, Don't Think That, which included features from Lil Uzi Vert and Hoodrich Pablo Juan.

=== 2019–present: Eighth mixtape and debut studio album ===
Baker released his eighth mixtape, I Am Me, on June 14, 2019, which included features from Lil Durk and Moneybagg Yo. NLE Choppa and Baker, both from Memphis, Tennessee, have done 3 collaborations, named ChopBloc, ChopBloc 2, and ChopBloc 3, respectively.

In March 2020, Baker released "Swervin". In May 2020, he released his highly anticipated single "No Chorus, Pt. 12", which was produced by longtime collaborator Tay Keith. After a build-up on pre-release singles, Baker's debut studio album, FatBoy, was released on October 9, 2020.

== Controversies ==
In October 2017, Baker filmed a dice game allegedly inside of Hamilton High School. Shortly afterwards, Shelby County Schools started investigating the incident.

During an Instagram Live on March 16, 2020, Baker jumped from a two-story balcony into his pool, barely clearing the edge and clipping his heel on the side of the pool.

In June 2020, 6ix9ine had an Instagram Live with DJ Akademiks. In the livestream, 6ix9ine targeted Baker, calling him a "one-hit wonder" and asked if he was working at Wendy's. Baker responded by saying, "Don't mention my name if you ain't on no gangsta shit".

In November 2020, Baker received severe criticism and was accused of homophobia after he said PlayStation was "for the gays" and mocked the brand as "GayStation", even saying that Xbox is for "the street n*ggas".

Baker is known for popularizing the "shoot" dance, which was incorporated in the Fortnite video game, made by Epic Games. Following similar lawsuits against Epic Games, Baker filed his own lawsuit against Epic in January 2019, claiming the use of his dance move as a dance emote in-game is infringing on his copyright and personality rights.

=== Legal issues ===
In February 2019, Baker was arrested on drug, gun and robbery charges, weeks after a warrant was issued for his arrest. Later on, in May of that year, Baker was arrested again on gun and drug charges. The arrest happened hours before he was scheduled to perform at the Beale Street Music Festival.

On October 1, 2024, Baker allegedly fell asleep behind the wheel of his car with a loaded handgun and marijuana in his lap; he was arrested for felon in possession of a firearm, possession of marijuana, and driving on a revoked license.

== Personal life ==
In 2020, Baker publicly voiced his support for United States president Donald Trump. He has one child.

== Discography ==
- FatBoy (2020)
- Bacc 2 Da Blocc (2022)

== Awards and nominations ==
| Year | Awards | Category | Nominated work | Result |
|---|---|---|---|---|
| 2018 | BET Hip Hop Awards | Best New Hip Hop Artist | | Nominated |
| 2018 | BET Hip Hop Awards | Best Collabo, Duo or Group | "Look Alive" (with Drake) | Nominated |
| 2018 | BET Hip Hop Awards | Best Mixtape | Simi | Won |
