= List of Billboard Hot 100 top-ten singles in 2021 =

This is a list of singles that charted in the top ten of the Billboard Hot 100, an all-genre singles chart, in 2021.

== Top-ten singles ==
Key

- ↑ – indicates single's top 10 entry was also its Hot 100 debut
- † – indicates Best performing song of the year
- (#) – 2021 Year-end top 10 single position and rank
- The "weeks in top ten" column reflects each song's entire chart life, not just its run during 2021.

List of Billboard Hot 100 top ten singles that peaked in 2021
Top ten entry date	Single	Artist(s)	Peak	Peak date	Weeks in top ten	Ref.
Singles from 2020
August 1	"Go Crazy"^{[A]}	Chris Brown and Young Thug	3	March 6	13	
November 14	"34+35"^{[B]} ↑	Ariana Grande^{1}	2	January 30	10	
Singles from 2021
January 9	"Levitating"^{[D]}^{[K]}^{[M]} † (#1)	Dua Lipa featuring DaBaby^{3}	2	May 22	41	
January 16	"Anyone" ↑	Justin Bieber	6	January 16	1	
January 16	"Bang!"	AJR	8	January 23	4	
January 23	"Drivers License" ↑ (#8)	Olivia Rodrigo	1	January 23	16	
January 23	"Wasted on You" ↑	Morgan Wallen	9	January 23	1	
January 23	"Good Days"	SZA	9	February 6	3	
February 13	"Save Your Tears"^{[I]}^{[J]} (#2)	The Weeknd and Ariana Grande^{2}	1	May 8	27	
February 13	"Whoopty"	CJ	10	February 13	1	
February 20	"Up" ↑	Cardi B	1	March 27	12	
February 20	"What You Know Bout Love"^{[C]}^{[E]}	Pop Smoke	9	March 13	4	
February 27	"Calling My Phone" ↑	Lil Tjay featuring 6lack	3	February 27	3	
March 20	"What's Next" ↑	Drake	1	March 20	3	
March 20	"Wants and Needs" ↑	Drake featuring Lil Baby	2	March 20	2	
March 20	"Lemon Pepper Freestyle" ↑	Drake featuring Rick Ross	3	March 20	1	
March 20	"Leave the Door Open" ↑ (#7)	Silk Sonic (Bruno Mars and Anderson .Paak)	1	April 17	18	
April 3	"Peaches" ↑ (#10)	Justin Bieber featuring Daniel Caesar and Giveon	1	April 3	16	
April 10	"Montero (Call Me by Your Name)"^{[G]}^{[H]}^{[L]} ↑ (#9)	Lil Nas X	1	April 10	20	
April 17	"Deja Vu"^{[F]} ↑	Olivia Rodrigo	3	June 5	15	
April 17	"Astronaut in the Ocean"^{[F]}	Masked Wolf	6	May 22	11	
April 24	"Rapstar" ↑	Polo G	1	April 24	5	
April 24	"Kiss Me More"^{[K]} ↑ (#6)	Doja Cat featuring SZA	3	July 10	27	
May 15	"Without You"	The Kid Laroi and Miley Cyrus	8	May 15	2	
May 15	"Your Power" ↑	Billie Eilish	10	May 15	1	
May 22	"Interlude" ↑	J. Cole	8	May 22	1	
May 29	"Good 4 U"^{[K]} ↑ (#5)	Olivia Rodrigo	1	May 29	24	
May 29	"My Life" ↑	J. Cole, 21 Savage and Morray	2	May 29	1	
May 29	"Amari" ↑	J. Cole	5	May 29	1	
May 29	"Pride Is the Devil" ↑	J. Cole and Lil Baby	7	May 29	1	
May 29	"95 South" ↑	J. Cole	8	May 29	1	
June 5	"Butter" ↑	BTS	1	June 5	15	
June 5	"Traitor" ↑	Olivia Rodrigo	9	June 5	1	
June 19	"Yonaguni" ↑	Bad Bunny	10	June 19	1	
July 10	"Bad Habits"^{[K]} ↑	Ed Sheeran	2	August 28	26	
July 24	"Permission to Dance" ↑	BTS	1	July 24	3	
July 24	"Stay" ↑	The Kid Laroi and Justin Bieber	1	August 14	44	
August 7	"Industry Baby"^{[K]} ↑	Lil Nas X and Jack Harlow	1	October 23	21	
August 21	"Take My Breath" ↑	The Weeknd	6	August 21	1	
August 28	"Rumors" ↑	Lizzo featuring Cardi B	4	August 28	1	
September 11	"Hurricane" ↑	Kanye West	6	September 11	1	
September 11	"Fancy Like"^{[K]}	Walker Hayes	3	October 16	11	
September 11	"Jail" ↑	Kanye West	10	September 11	1	
September 18	"Way 2 Sexy" ↑	Drake featuring Future and Young Thug	1	September 18	9	
September 18	"Girls Want Girls" ↑	Drake featuring Lil Baby	2	September 18	2	
September 18	"Fair Trade" ↑	Drake featuring Travis Scott	3	September 18	1	
September 18	"Champagne Poetry" ↑	Drake	4	September 18	1	
September 18	"Knife Talk" ↑	Drake featuring 21 Savage and Project Pat	4	September 25	5	
September 18	"In the Bible" ↑	Drake featuring Lil Durk and Giveon	7	September 18	1	
September 18	"Papi's Home" ↑	Drake	8	September 18	1	
September 18	"TSU" ↑	Drake	9	September 18	1	
September 18	"Love All" ↑	Drake featuring Jay-Z	10	September 18	1	
October 9	"My Universe" ↑	Coldplay and BTS	1	October 9	1	
October 16	"Essence"	Wizkid featuring Justin Bieber and Tems	9	October 23	2	
October 30	"Easy on Me"	Adele	1	October 30	23	
November 6	"Need to Know"	Doja Cat	8	November 13	9	
November 20	"One Right Now" ↑	Post Malone and The Weeknd	6	November 20	1	
November 20	"Smokin out the Window" ↑	Silk Sonic (Bruno Mars and Anderson .Paak)	5	November 27	3	
November 27	"All Too Well (Taylor's Version)" ↑	Taylor Swift	1	November 27	2	
December 4	"Oh My God" ↑	Adele	5	December 4	1	
December 18	"I Hate U" ↑	SZA	7	December 18	1	

=== 2020 peaks ===
List of Billboard Hot 100 top ten singles in 2021 that peaked in 2020
Top ten entry date	Single	Artist(s)	Peak	Peak date	Weeks in top ten	Ref.
February 29	"Blinding Lights"^{[A]} (#3)	The Weeknd	1	April 4	57	
August 29	"Laugh Now Cry Later"^{[A]} ↑	Drake featuring Lil Durk	2	August 29	19	
August 29	"I Hope"^{[A]}	Gabby Barrett featuring Charlie Puth	3	November 21	14	
September 5	"Dynamite"^{[A]} ↑	BTS	1	September 5	13	
September 12	"Mood" (#4)	24kGoldn featuring Iann Dior	1	October 24	31	
October 3	"Holy"^{[A]} ↑	Justin Bieber featuring Chance the Rapper	3	October 3	14	
November 7	"Positions"^{[A]} ↑	Ariana Grande	1	November 7	17	

=== 2022 peaks ===
List of Billboard Hot 100 top ten singles in 2021 that peaked in 2022
Top ten entry date	Single	Artist(s)	Peak	Peak date	Weeks in top ten	Ref.
October 2	"Thats What I Want" ↑	Lil Nas X	8	April 2	9	
October 23	"Shivers"	Ed Sheeran	4	January 15	19	
November 13	"Heat Waves"	Glass Animals	1	March 12	37	

=== Holiday season ===
Holiday titles first making the Billboard Hot 100 top ten during the 2020–21 holiday season
Top ten entry date	Single	Artist(s)	Peak	Peak date	Weeks in top ten	Ref.
December 19, 2020	"Feliz Navidad"	José Feliciano	6	January 2, 2021	9	
January 2, 2021	"Let It Snow, Let It Snow, Let It Snow"	Dean Martin	7	January 6, 2024	8	
January 2, 2021	"Last Christmas"^{[P]}	Wham!	2	December 13, 2025	22	
January 2, 2021	"Run Rudolph Run"	Chuck Berry	10	January 2, 2021	1	

Recurring holiday titles, appearing in the Billboard Hot 100 top ten in previous holiday seasons
Top ten entry date	Single	Artist(s)	Peak	Peak date	Weeks in top ten	Ref.
December 30, 2017	"All I Want for Christmas Is You"^{[N]}	Mariah Carey	1	December 21, 2019	43	
December 29, 2018	"It's the Most Wonderful Time of the Year"^{[O]}	Andy Williams	5	January 2, 2021	24	
January 5, 2019	"Rockin' Around the Christmas Tree"^{[N]}	Brenda Lee	1	December 9, 2023	35	
January 5, 2019	"Jingle Bell Rock"^{[N]}	Bobby Helms	2	December 27, 2025	32	
January 5, 2019	"A Holly Jolly Christmas"^{[N]}	Burl Ives	4	January 4, 2020	26	

=== Notes ===
^{1} A remix of Ariana Grande's "34+35" that features Doja Cat and Megan Thee Stallion helped to bring the song back into the top ten, to its peak position of number 2, on January 30, 2021, and all three artists were credited on the song that week. As of the February 6, 2021 chart, Grande returned to being the only artist credited.
^{2} Ariana Grande is credited on a remix of The Weeknd's "Save Your Tears", with her name appearing on the song beginning with the Hot 100 chart dated May 8, 2021. Prior to that week, The Weeknd was the sole artist credit.
^{3} DaBaby is no longer listed as a featured artist beginning with the Hot 100 chart dated August 28, 2021. His name is being retained on the entry as he was credited for a majority of the song's run in the top ten, including the week it peaked at number two.

^{A} The single re-entered the top ten on the week ending January 9, 2021.
^{B} The single re-entered the top ten on the week ending January 30, 2021.
^{C} The single re-entered the top ten on the week ending March 13, 2021.
^{D} The single re-entered the top ten on the week ending March 27, 2021.
^{E} The single re-entered the top ten on the week ending April 3, 2021.
^{F} The single re-entered the top ten on the week ending June 5, 2021.
^{G} The single re-entered the top ten on the week ending June 12, 2021.
^{H} The single re-entered the top ten on the week ending June 26, 2021.
^{I} The single re-entered the top ten on the week ending August 14, 2021.
^{J} The single re-entered the top ten on the week ending September 4, 2021.
^{K} The single re-entered the top ten on the week ending September 25, 2021.
^{L} The single re-entered the top ten on the week ending October 2, 2021.
^{M} The single re-entered the top ten on the week ending October 9, 2021.
^{N} The single re-entered the top ten on the week ending December 11, 2021.
^{O} The single re-entered the top ten on the week ending December 18, 2021.
^{P} The single re-entered the top ten on the week ending December 25, 2021.

== Artists with most top-ten songs ==
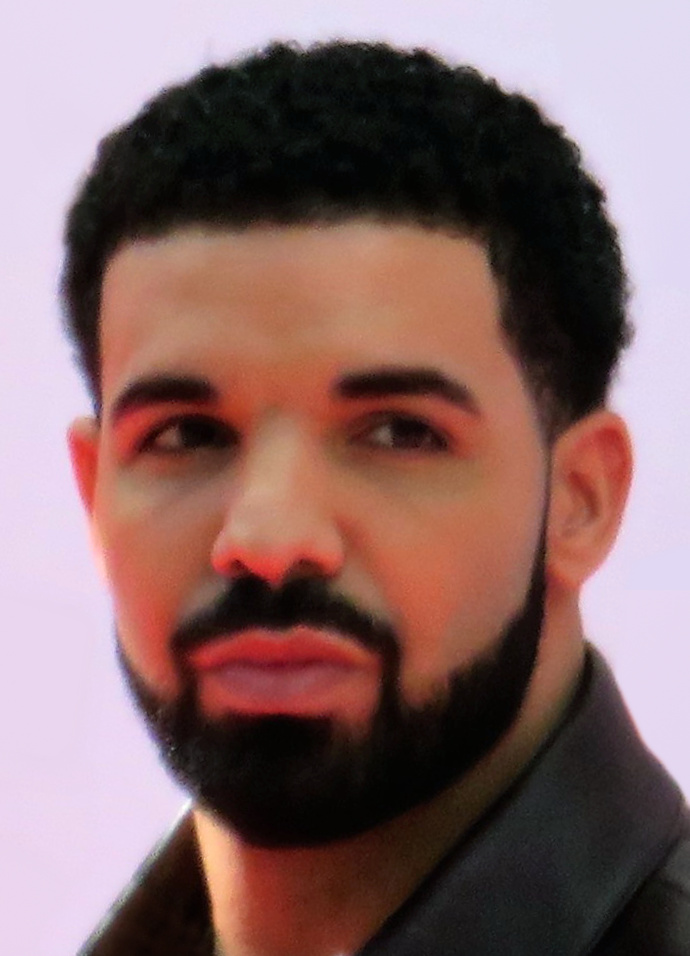
Drake (pictured) matched his record for the most top 10 hits in a calendar year in 2021 with thirteen, nine of which are from his sixth studio album, Certified Lover Boy, which broke the record for most top ten songs from one album. Those nine songs were all in the top ten in the same week.

List of artists by total songs peaking in the top-ten
Artist	Numbers of songs
Drake	13
J. Cole	5
Justin Bieber	5
BTS	4
Olivia Rodrigo	4
The Weeknd	4
Ariana Grande	3
Lil Nas X	3
SZA	3
Adele	2
Anderson .Paak	2
Bruno Mars	2
Cardi B	2
Doja Cat	2
Ed Sheeran	2
Giveon	2
Kanye West	2
The Kid Laroi	2
Lil Durk	2
Silk Sonic	2

== See also ==
- 2021 in American music
- List of Billboard Hot 100 number ones of 2021
- Billboard Year-End Hot 100 singles of 2021
