= Billboard Year-End Hot R&B/Hip-Hop Songs of 2021 =

American music chart

This is a list of Billboard magazine's Top Hot R&B/Hip-Hop Songs of 2021.

No.	Title	Artist(s)
1	"Leave the Door Open"	Silk Sonic
2	"Peaches"	Justin Bieber featuring Daniel Caesar and Giveon
3	"Astronaut in the Ocean"	Masked Wolf
4	"Up"	Cardi B
5	"Go Crazy"	Chris Brown and Young Thug
6	"Industry Baby"	Lil Nas X featuring Jack Harlow
7	"Rapstar"	Polo G
8	"Blinding Lights"	The Weeknd
9	"Calling My Phone"	Lil Tjay featuring 6lack
10	"Heartbreak Anniversary"	Giveon
11	"What You Know Bout Love"	Pop Smoke
12	"Best Friend"	Saweetie featuring Doja Cat
13	"Wants and Needs"	Drake featuring Lil Baby
14	"Beat Box"	SpotemGottem featuring Pooh Shiesty or DaBaby
15	"Wockesha"	Moneybagg Yo
16	"On Me"	Lil Baby
17	"You Right"	Doja Cat and The Weeknd
18	"For the Night"	Pop Smoke featuring Lil Baby and DaBaby
19	"Way 2 Sexy"	Drake featuring Future and Young Thug
20	"Whoopty"	CJ
21	"Good Days"	SZA
22	"Body"	Megan Thee Stallion
23	"Back in Blood"	Pooh Shiesty featuring Lil Durk
24	"You're Mines Still"	Yung Bleu featuring Drake
25	"Every Chance I Get"	DJ Khaled featuring Lil Baby and Lil Durk
26	"Laugh Now Cry Later"	Drake featuring Lil Durk
27	"Time Today"	Moneybagg Yo
28	"Essence"	Wizkid featuring Justin Bieber and Tems
29	"What's Next"	Drake
30	"Lemonade"	Internet Money, Gunna and Don Toliver featuring Nav
31	"Streets"	Doja Cat
32	"Late at Night"	Roddy Ricch
33	"Thot Shit"	Megan Thee Stallion
34	"Cry Baby"	Megan Thee Stallion featuring DaBaby
35	"Track Star"	Mooski
36	"No More Parties"	Coi Leray featuring Lil Durk
37	"Knife Talk"	Drake featuring 21 Savage and Project Pat
38	"Tombstone"	Rod Wave
39	"Throat Baby (Go Baby)"	BRS Kash
40	"Girls Want Girls"	Drake featuring Lil Baby
41	"Whole Lotta Money"	Bia featuring Nicki Minaj
42	"Wap"	Cardi B featuring Megan Thee Stallion
43	"My Life"	J. Cole, 21 Savage and Morray
44	"Ski"	Young Thug and Gunna
45	"Damage"	H.E.R.
46	"Wild Side"	Normani featuring Cardi B
47	"Fair Trade"	Drake featuring Travis Scott
48	"Ain't Shit"	Doja Cat
49	"Rockstar"	DaBaby featuring Roddy Ricch
50	"Tyler Herro"	Jack Harlow
51	"Holiday"	Lil Nas X
52	"Quicksand"	Morray
53	"2055"	Sleepy Hallow
54	"Street Runner"	Rod Wave
55	"Hurricane"	Kanye West
56	"Pick Up Your Feelings"	Jazmine Sullivan
57	"4 Da Gang"	42 Dugg and Roddy Ricch
58	"Masterpiece"	DaBaby
59	"Straightenin"	Migos
60	"Come Through"	H.E.R. featuring Chris Brown
61	"Miss the Rage"	Trippie Redd and Playboi Carti
62	"Gyalis"	Capella Grey
63	"Drankin n Smokin"	Future and Lil Uzi Vert
64	"Took Her to the O"	King Von
65	"Mr. Right Now"	21 Savage and Metro Boomin featuring Drake
66	"Family Ties"	Baby Keem and Kendrick Lamar
67	"Buss It"	Erica Banks
68	"Champagne Poetry"	Drake
69	"Woman"	Doja Cat
70	"Motley Crew"	Post Malone
71	"Back to the Streets"	Saweetie featuring Jhené Aiko
72	"Rumors"	Lizzo and Cardi B
73	"Moonwalking in Calabasas"	DDG
74	"Sharing Locations"	Meek Mill featuring Lil Baby and Lil Durk
75	"Said Sum"	Moneybagg Yo
76	"Pride Is the Devil"	J. Cole and Lil Baby
77	"Still Trappin'"	Lil Durk and King Von
78	"Hats Off"	Lil Baby, Lil Durk and Travis Scott
79	"No Friends in the Industry"	Drake
80	"Baddest"	Yung Bleu, Chris Brown and 2 Chainz
81	"In the Bible"	Drake featuring Lil Durk and Giveon
82	"Solid"	Young Thug and Gunna
83	"B.S."	Jhené Aiko featuring H.E.R.
84	"Lemon Pepper Freestyle"	Drake featuring Rick Ross
85	"Get Into It (Yuh)"	Doja Cat
86	"Skate"	Silk Sonic
87	"Hello"	Pop Smoke featuring A Boogie wit da Hoodie
88	"Hellcats & Trackhawks"	Lil Durk
89	"You Got It"	Vedo
90	"Hit Different"	SZA featuring Ty Dolla Sign
91	"TSU"	Drake
92	"Love All"	Drake featuring Jay-Z
93	"Twerkulator"	City Girls
94	"Maybach"	42 Dugg featuring Future
95	"Have Mercy"	Chlöe
96	"Ball If I Want To"	DaBaby
97	"N 2 Deep"	Drake featuring Future
98	"Outside"	MO3 and OG Bobby Billions
99	"WusYaName"	Tyler, the Creator featuring YoungBoy Never Broke Again and Ty Dolla Sign
100	"Rags2Riches"	Rod Wave featuring ATR Son Son

== See also ==
- 2021 in music
- Billboard Year-End Hot 100 singles of 2021
- Billboard Year-End Hot Rap Songs of 2021
- List of number-one R&B/hip-hop songs of 2021 (U.S.)
