= List of awards and nominations received by J. Cole =

J. Cole awards and nominations
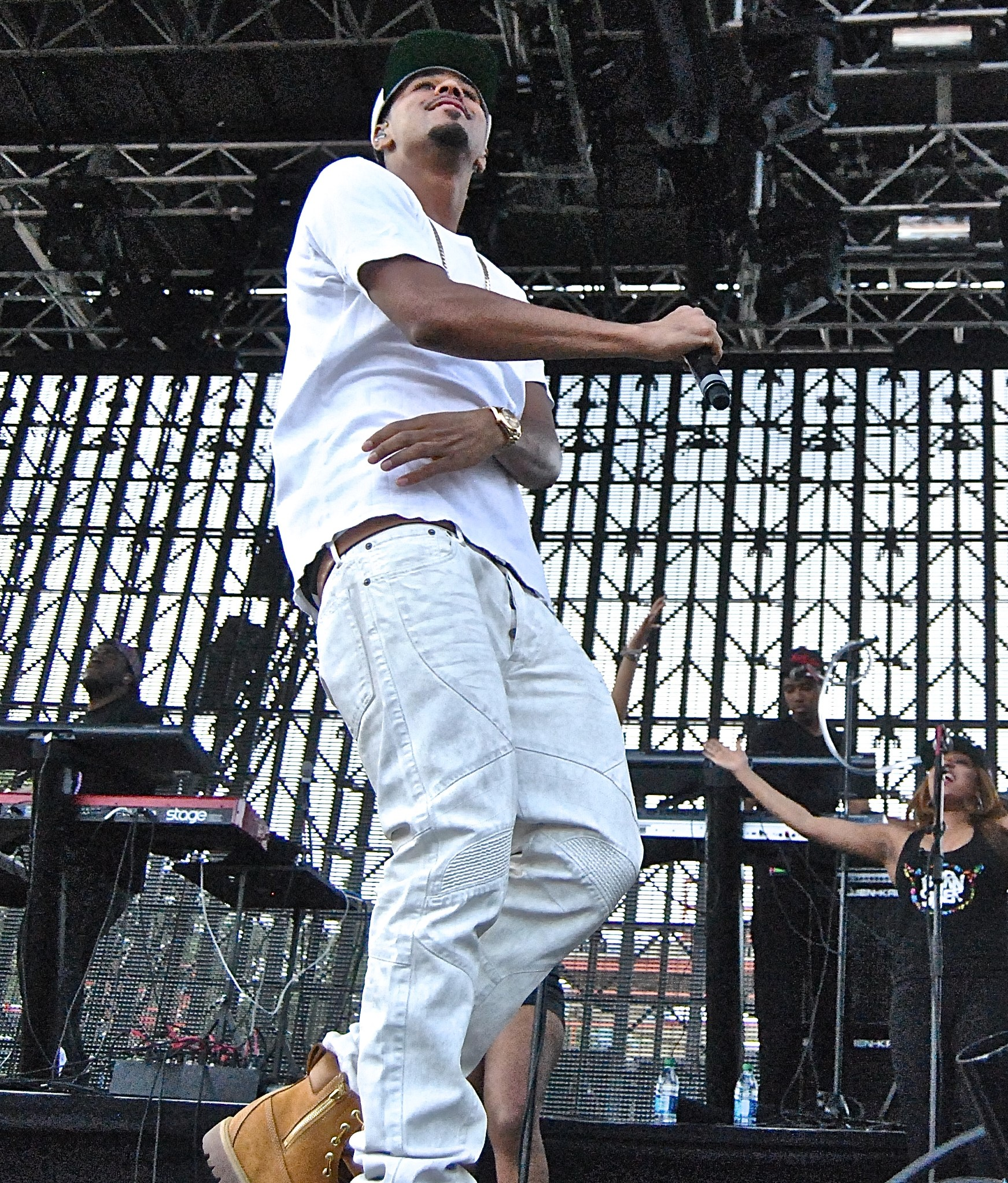
- J. Cole performing in 2014
Awards and nominations
Award	Wins	Nominations
American Music Award	0	3
BET Hip Hop Awards	8	37
Billboard Music Awards	1	7
Grammy Award	2	18
MTV Video Music Awards	0	7
NAACP Image Awards	0	6
Soul Train Music Awards	0	9

Totals (Note: Certain award groups do not simply award one winner. They acknowledge several different recipients, have runners-up, and have third place. Since this is a specific recognition and is different from losing an award, runner-up mentions are considered wins in this award tally. For simplification and to avoid errors, each award in this list has been presumed to have had a prior nomination.)
- Wins: 11
- Nominations: 122

Throughout his career, American rapper J. Cole has received more than 10 awards and over 100 nominations. Cole has been nominated for three American Music Awards, has won eight BET Hip Hop Awards from a total thirty-seven nominations, has won one Billboard Music Award from seven nominations, has won two Grammy Awards from eighteen nominations, and has been nominated for seven MTV Video Music Awards, six NAACP Image Awards, and nine Soul Train Music Awards.

== American Music Awards ==
Year	Nominee / work	Award	Result	Ref.
2012	Himself	New Artist of the Year	Nominated	
2012	Cole World: The Sideline Story	Favorite Rap/Hip Hop Album	Nominated	
2015	2014 Forest Hills Drive	Favorite Rap/Hip Hop Album	Nominated	

== BET Awards ==
Year	Nominee / work	Award	Result	Ref.
2011	Himself	Best New Artist	Nominated	
2012	Himself	Best Male Hip Hop Artist	Nominated	
2012	"Party (Remix)" (with Beyoncé)	Best Collaboration	Nominated	
2014	Himself	Best Male Hip Hop Artist	Nominated	
2016	Himself	Best Male Hip Hop Artist	Nominated	
2017	Himself	Best Male Hip Hop Artist	Nominated	
2017	4 Your Eyez Only	Album of the Year	Nominated	
2018	Himself	Best Male Hip Hop Artist	Nominated	
2019	Himself	Best Male Hip Hop Artist	Nominated	
2019	"A Lot" (with 21 Savage)	Video of the Year	Nominated	
2019	"A Lot" (with 21 Savage)	Best Collaboration	Nominated	
2019	"Middle Child"	Viewers' Choice Award	Nominated	
2021	Himself	Best Male Hip Hop Artist	Nominated	
2026	The Fall-Off	Album of the Year	Pending	
2026	Himself	Best Male Hip Hop Artist	Pending	

== BET Hip Hop Awards ==
Year	Nominee / work	Award	Result	Ref.
2011	Friday Night Lights	Best Mixtape	Won	
2012	Cole World: The Sideline Story	CD of the Year	Nominated	
2012	Himself	MVP of the Year	Nominated	
2012	Himself	Producer of the Year	Nominated	
2012	Himself	Lyricist of the Year	Nominated	
2012	Himself	Best Live Performer	Nominated	
2012	"Nobody's Perfect" (featuring Missy Elliott)	Reese's Perfect Combo Award (Best collaboration)	Nominated	
2013	Born Sinner	Album of the Year	Nominated	
2013	"Power Trip" (featuring Miguel)	Best Collabo, Duo or Group	Nominated	
2013	"Power Trip" (featuring Miguel)	Best Hip-Hop Video	Nominated	
2013	"Power Trip" (featuring Miguel)	Track of the Year	Nominated	
2013	"Power Trip" (featuring Miguel)	People's Champ Award	Nominated	
2013	Himself	MVP of the Year	Nominated	
2013	Himself	Producer of the Year	Nominated	
2013	Himself	Lyricist of the Year	Nominated	
2013	Himself	Best Live Performer	Nominated	
2013	"Crooked Smile" (featuring TLC)	Impact Track	Won	
2014	"Crooked Smile" (featuring TLC)	Best Hip Hop Video	Nominated	
2014	Himself	Lyricist of the Year	Nominated	
2015	Himself	Lyricist of the Year	Nominated	
2015	Himself	MVP of the Year	Nominated	
2015	Himself	Producer of the Year	Nominated	
2015	Himself	Best Live Performer	Won	
2015	Himself	Hustler of the Year	Nominated	
2015	2014 Forest Hills Drive	Album of the Year	Won	
2015	"Apparently"	Impact Track	Nominated	
2015	"Be Free"	Impact Track	Nominated	
2016	"Love Yourz"	Impact Track	Won	
2016	Himself	Hot Ticket Performer	Nominated	
2016	Himself	Lyricist of the Year	Nominated	
2017	4 Your Eyez Only	Album of the Year	Nominated	
2017	Himself	Hot Ticket Performer	Nominated	
2017	Himself	Lyricist of the Year	Nominated	
2018	KOD	Album of the Year	Nominated	
2018	Himself	MVP of the Year	Nominated	
2018	Himself	Lyricist of the Year	Nominated	
2019	Himself	Lyricist of the Year	Won	
2019	Himself	MVP of the Year	Nominated	
2019	Revenge of the Dreamers III	Album of the Year	Nominated	
2019	"A Lot" (with 21 Savage)	Best Hip Hop Video	Nominated	
2019	"A Lot" (with 21 Savage)	Best Collabo, Duo or Group	Nominated	
2019	"A Lot" (with 21 Savage)	Sweet 16: Best Featured Verse	Won	
2019	"A Lot" (with 21 Savage)	Impact Track	Won	
2019	"Middle Child"	Impact Track	Nominated	
2020	Himself	Lyricist of the Year	Nominated	
2020	"Snow on tha Bluff"	Impact Track	Nominated	
2021	Himself	Artist of the Year	Nominated	
2021	Himself	Lyricist of the Year	Won	
2021	The Off-Season	Album of the Year	Nominated	
2023	Himself	Artist of the Year	Nominated	
2023	Himself	Lyricist of the Year	Nominated	
2023	"All My Life"	Song of the Year	Nominated	
2023	"All My Life"	Best Collaboration	Won	
2023	"All My Life"	Sweet 16: Best Featured Verse	Nominated	
2023	"All My Life"	Impact Track	Won	

== Billboard Music Awards ==
Year	Nominee / work	Award	Result	Ref.
2014	Born Sinner	Top Rap Album	Nominated	
2015	2014 Forest Hills Drive	Top Rap Album	Won	
2015	Himself	Top Rap Artist	Nominated	
2017	Himself	Top Rap Artist	Nominated	
2017	4 Your Eyez Only	Top Rap Album	Nominated	
2018	4 Your Eyez Only World Tour	Top Rap Tour	Nominated	
2022	The Off-Season Tour	Top Rap Tour	Nominated	

== Grammy Awards ==
Year	Category	Work	Outcome	Ref.
2012	Best New Artist	Himself	Nominated	
2014	Best Rap/Sung Performance	"Power Trip"	Nominated	
2016	Best Rap Album	2014 Forest Hills Drive	Nominated	
2016	Best Rap Performance	"Apparently"	Nominated	
2016	Best R&B Performance	"Planez"	Nominated	
2019	Best Rap/Sung Performance	"Pretty Little Fears"	Nominated	
2019	Best R&B Song	"Come Through and Chill"	Nominated	
2020	Best Rap Performance	"Middle Child"	Nominated	
2020	Best Rap Performance	"Down Bad" (with JID, Bas, EarthGang and Young Nudy)	Nominated	
2020	Best Rap Song	"A Lot" (with 21 Savage)	Won	
2020	Best Rap/Sung Performance	"The London" (with Young Thug and Travis Scott)	Nominated	
2020	Best Rap Album	Revenge of the Dreamers III	Nominated	
2022	Best Rap Performance	"My Life" (featuring 21 Savage and Morray)	Nominated	
2022	Best Rap Song	"My Life" (featuring 21 Savage and Morray)	Nominated	
2022	Best Melodic Rap Performance	"Pride Is the Devil" (featuring Lil Baby)	Nominated	
2022	Best Rap Album	The Off-Season	Nominated	
2024	Best Melodic Rap Performance	"All My Life" (with Lil Durk)	Won	
2025	Best Rap Album	Might Delete Later	Nominated	

== MTV Europe Music Awards ==
Year	Nominee / work	Award	Result	Ref.
2018	Wireless Festival	Best World Stage	Nominated	
2019	Himself	Best Hip-Hop	Nominated	

== MTV Video Music Awards ==
Year	Nominee / work	Award	Result	Ref.
2013	"Power Trip" (featuring Miguel)	Best Hip Hop	Nominated	
2014	"Crooked Smile" (featuring TLC)	Best Video with a Social Message	Nominated	
2018	"ATM (Addicted to Money)"	Best Art Direction	Nominated	
2018	"ATM (Addicted to Money)"	Best Hip Hop	Nominated	
2019	"A Lot" (with 21 Savage)	Best Hip Hop	Nominated	
2019	"A Lot" (with 21 Savage)	Video of the Year	Nominated	
2019	"The London" (with Travis Scott and Young Thug)	Song of the Summer	Nominated	

== MTVU Woodie Awards ==
Year	Nominee / work	Award	Result	Ref.
2012	Himself	Woodie of the Year: Series of Popular Mixtapes	Nominated	

== NAACP Image Awards ==
Year	Nominee / work	Award	Result	Ref.
2016	"No Sleeep" (with Janet Jackson)	Outstanding Duo, Group or Collaboration	Nominated	
2016	"No Sleeep" (with Janet Jackson)	Outstanding Music Video	Nominated	
2016	"No Sleeep" (with Janet Jackson)	Outstanding Song, Contemporary	Nominated	
2020	"Shea Butter Baby" (with Ari Lennox)	Outstanding Duo, Group or Collaboration	Nominated	
2022	Himself	Outstanding Male Artist	Nominated	
2022	"My Life" (with 21 Savage)	Outstanding Hip Hop/Rap Song	Nominated	

== Soul Train Music Awards ==
Year	Nominee / work	Award	Result	Ref.
2012	Himself	Best New Artist	Nominated	
2013	Power Trip" featuring Miguel	Best Hip-Hop Song of the Year	Nominated	
2013	Power Trip" featuring Miguel	Best Collaboration	Nominated	
2013	"Crooked Smile" featuring TLC	The Ashford and Simpson Songwriter's Award	Nominated	
2015	"Apparently"	The Ashford and Simpson Songwriter's Award	Nominated	
2019	"A Lot" (with 21 Savage)	Best Hip-Hop Song Of The Year	Nominated	
2019	"Middle Child"	Best Hip-Hop Song Of The Year	Nominated	
2019	"Shea Butter Baby" (with Ari Lennox)	Best Collaboration Performance	Nominated	
2019	"Purple Emoji" (with Ty Dolla Sign)	Best Collaboration Performance	Nominated	
