= The Off-Season Tour =

2021–22 concert tour by J. Cole and 21 Savage

- Tour by J. Cole & 21 Savage
- Promotional poster
- Associated album: The Off-Season
- Start date: September 24, 2021
- End date: April 3, 2022
- Legs: 1
- No. of shows: 20
J. Cole tour chronology
KOD Tour (2018)	The Off-Season Tour (2021)	It's All a Blur Tour - As Big as the What? (2023)
21 Savage tour chronology
I Am > I Was Tour (2019)	The Off-Season Tour (2021)	It's All a Blur Tour (2023)

The Off-Season Tour was a co-headlining concert tour by American rapper J. Cole and Atlanta-based rapper 21 Savage, in support of Cole's sixth studio album The Off-Season (2021). The tour began on September 24, 2021, in Miami at the FTX Arena, and concluded on April 3, 2022, in Raleigh at his second Dreamville Festival.

== Background and development ==
On June 21, 2021, J. Cole posted a teaser on his official Twitter and Instagram accounts, respectively, asking his fans if he should tour for his album, The Off-Season, asking, "Should I tour this one?". He followed up the teaser the next day on June 22 by officially announcing the dates of the tour, along with announcing his co-headliner, 21 Savage, and support for the tour, Morray.

On June 23, 2021, Spotify held a presale for early access to tickets via Ticketmaster, while all venues held their own presale the following day. General sale for the tour began on June 25, both also via Ticketmaster.

On September 19, 2021, American comedian Druski, along with Cole's manager Ibrahim Hamad, and record label Dreamville announced that Druski would be an additional opener and "host" for the tour. An add-on date meet and greet package to meet Druski was released to the public for every arena show date the following day on September 20.

== Set lists ==
These set lists are representative of the show on September 25, 2021, in Orlando. They are not representative of all concerts for the duration of the tour.

J. Cole

1. "Punchin' the Clock" (Introduction)
2. "95 South"
3. "Amari"
4. "Applying Pressure"
5. "100 Mil'" (with Bas)
6. "Let Go My Hand" (with Bas)
7. "A Tale of 2 Citiez"
8. "G.O.M.D."
9. "Wet Dreamz"
10. "Back to the Topic"
11. "Nobody's Perfect"
12. "Work Out"
13. "Can't Get Enough"
14. "Power Trip"
15. "Under the Sun"
16. "Down Bad" (with Bas)
17. "The Jackie" (with Bas)
18. "The Climb Back"
19. "Close"
20. "Pride Is the Devil"
21. "A Lot" (with 21 Savage)
22. "Quicksand" (with Morray)
23. "My Life" (with 21 Savage & Morray)
24. "No Role Modelz"
25. "The London"
26. "Planez"
27. "Middle Child"

21 Savage

1. "Don't Come Out the House"
2. "10 Freaky Girls"
3. "Runnin"
4. "Red Opps"
5. "Mr. Right Now"
6. "rockstar"
7. "Knife Talk"
8. "No Heart"
9. "X"
10. "Bank Account"
Notes
- During the Miami show, Drake joined J. Cole and performed "Laugh Now Cry Later", "Knife Talk" (also with 21 Savage), and "Way 2 Sexy" (also with Future).
- During the Orlando show, there were a number of delays related to production issues and technical difficulties, which affected ticket entry and the audience being seated, as well as the start times. Only Cole and 21 Savage performed, with 21 Savage having a shortened set, and while Morray did not perform his opening act, he later joined J. Cole during his set for his song "Quicksand", and Cole's song "My Life" alongside 21 Savage.
- During the Atlanta show, JID and EarthGang joined J. Cole and Bas for the performances of "Down Bad" and "The Jackie"
- During the Greensboro show, there were again delays related to production issues and technical difficulties, affecting the concert in the same respects as the Orlando show; again Morray did not perform his opening act, but later joined Cole and 21 Savage for "My Life". 21 Savage did not perform his co-headlining set. Instead, 21 Savage joined Cole during his set, performing songs that were originally in his own set.
- During the Chicago show, G Herbo was brought onstage during 21 Savage's set and performed "2 Chains", "Statement", and" T.O.P."
- During the Houston and Inglewood shows, Ari Lennox joined J. Cole during his set.

== Tour dates ==
List of concerts, showing date, city, venue, opening act, and attendance
Dates	City	Venue	Opening acts	Attendance	Revenue
September 24, 2021	Miami	FTX Arena	Druski; Morray	12,061 / 12,061	$1,309,562
September 25, 2021	Orlando	Amway Center	—N/a	11,306 / 11,306	$1,220,678
September 27, 2021	Atlanta	State Farm Arena	Druski; Morray	11,951 / 11,951	$1,094,506
September 28, 2021	Greensboro	Greensboro Coliseum Complex	Druski	—	—
October 1, 2021	Boston	TD Garden	Druski; Morray	12,636 / 12,907	$1,382,446
October 2, 2021	Brooklyn	Barclays Center	Druski; Morray	13,643 / 13,643	$1,827,469
October 4, 2021	Washington, D.C.	Capital One Arena	Druski; Morray	—	—
October 7, 2021	Chicago	United Center	Druski; Morray	—	—
October 10, 2021	Houston	Toyota Center	Druski; Morray	11,910 / 11,910	$1,749,408
October 11, 2021	Dallas	American Airlines Center	Druski; Morray	12,873 / 12,873	$1,549,349
October 14, 2021	Denver	Ball Arena	Druski; Morray	—	—
October 16, 2021	Las Vegas	MGM Grand Garden Arena	Druski; Morray	12,541 / 12,541	$1,404,467
October 17, 2021	Phoenix	Footprint Center	Druski; Morray	12,144 / 12,144	$1,216,836
October 20, 2021	Oakland	Oakland Arena	Druski; Morray	13,070 / 13,505	$1,404,561
October 21, 2021	Inglewood	The Forum	Druski; Morray	13,641 / 13,641	$1,942,147
October 25, 2021	Detroit (Note: The concerts on October 25 and 27, 2021 in Detroit and Philadelphia, respectively were rescheduled from their original dates due to production delays. 21 Savage did not perform at either of these dates.)	Little Caesars Arena	Druski; Morray	14,599 / 20,000	$1,230,700
October 27, 2021	Philadelphia	Wells Fargo Center	Druski; Morray	12,134 / 12,134	$1,300,173
October 29, 2021	New York City (Note: The concert on October 29, 2021, at Citi Field in New York City is part of Rolling Loud. J. Cole only.)	Citi Field	—N/a	—N/a	—N/a
December 11, 2021	San Bernardino (Note: The concert on December 11, 2021 at NOS Event Center in San Bernardino is part of Rolling Loud. J. Cole and Morray only.)	NOS Event Center	—N/a	—N/a	—N/a
April 3, 2022	Raleigh	Dorothea Dix Park (Note: The concert on April 3, 2022 at Dorothea Dix Park in Raleigh is part of Dreamville Festival. J. Cole and Morray only.)	Performers Day 1 (April 2); Blxst; Fivio Foreign; EarthGang; Ja Rule + Ashanti; JID; Kehlani; Lil Baby; Lute; Mereba; Mikhala Jené; Moneybagg Yo; Morray; Wizkid; Day 2 Ari Lennox; Bas; Bia; Cozz; DJ Drama's Gangsta Grillz with Lil Wayne, Jeezy, T.I. Kyle Banks; Larry June; Rico Nasty; Omen; T-Pain; Wale; Wiz Khalifa	—N/a	—N/a
Total				164,509 / 170,616 (96.42%)	$18,632,302
