= Billboard Year-End Hot Rap Songs of 2021 =

American music chart

This is a list of Billboard magazine's Top Hot Rap Songs of 2021.

No.	Title	Artist(s)
1	"Mood"	24kGoldn featuring Iann Dior
2	"Astronaut in the Ocean"	Masked Wolf
3	"Up"	Cardi B
4	"Industry Baby"	Lil Nas X featuring Jack Harlow
5	"Rapstar"	Polo G
6	"Calling My Phone"	Lil Tjay featuring 6lack
7	"What You Know Bout Love"	Pop Smoke
8	"Best Friend"	Saweetie featuring Doja Cat
9	"Wants and Needs"	Drake featuring Lil Baby
10	"Beat Box"	SpotemGottem featuring Pooh Shiesty or DaBaby
11	"On Me"	Lil Baby
12	"Wockesha"	Moneybagg Yo
13	"For the Night"	Pop Smoke featuring Lil Baby and DaBaby
14	"Way 2 Sexy"	Drake featuring Future and Young Thug
15	"Whoopty"	CJ
16	"Laugh Now Cry Later"	Drake featuring Lil Durk
17	"Back in Blood"	Pooh Shiesty featuring Lil Durk
18	"Body"	Megan Thee Stallion
19	"Every Chance I Get"	DJ Khaled featuring Lil Baby and Lil Durk
20	"Time Today"	Moneybagg Yo
21	"Lemonade"	Internet Money, Gunna and Don Toliver featuring Nav
22	"Late at Night"	Roddy Ricch
23	"Thot Shit"	Megan Thee Stallion
24	"Cry Baby"	Megan Thee Stallion featuring DaBaby
25	"What's Next"	Drake
26	"Knife Talk"	Drake featuring 21 Savage and Project Pat
27	"Girls Want Girls"	Drake featuring Lil Baby
28	"No More Parties"	Coi Leray featuring Lil Durk
29	"Throat Baby (Go Baby)"	BRS Kash
30	"WAP"	Cardi B and Megan Thee Stallion
31	"Whole Lotta Money"	Bia
32	"Fair Trade"	Drake featuring Travis Scott
33	"Tombstone"	Rod Wave
34	"My Life"	J. Cole, 21 Savage and Morray
35	"Rockstar"	DaBaby featuring Roddy Ricch
36	"Tyler Herro"	Jack Harlow
37	"Holiday"	Lil Nas X
38	"Hurricane"	Kanye West and The Weeknd featuring Lil Baby
39	"Straightenin"	Migos
40	"Family Ties"	Baby Keem and Kendrick Lamar
41	"Ski"	Young Thug and Gunna
42	"Mr. Right Now"	21 Savage and Metro Boomin featuring Drake
43	"Said Sum"	Moneybagg Yo
44	"Ain't Shit"	Doja Cat
45	"Street Runner"	Rod Wave
46	"2055"	Sleepy Hallow
47	"Champagne Poetry"	Drake
48	"Rumors"	Lizzo featuring Cardi B
49	"No Friends in the Industry"	Drake
50	"Buss It"	Erica Banks

== See also ==
- 2021 in music
- Billboard Year-End Hot 100 singles of 2021
