= Street Sermons =

Mixtape by Morray
- Released: April 28, 2021
- Recorded: 2020–2021
- Genre: Hip-hop; R&B
- Length: 36:28
- Label: Pick Six; Interscope
- Producer: Andyr; Ant Chamberlain; Boston; Callari; Danny Couture; DatBoiGetro; DJ Chose; Dystinkt Beats; Dzimi; ForeignGotEm; Hagan; Jimmie Gutch; KC Supreme; LayZBeats; Mike Woods; P Crisco; Pat McManus; Poly Boy; SephGotTheWaves; Taz Taylor; The Beat Menace

Singles from Street Sermons
- 1. "Quicksand" Released: October 30, 2020; 2. "Switched Up" Released: November 20, 2020; 3. "Big Decisions" Released: January 7, 2021; 4. "Kingdom" Released: February 5, 2021; 5. "Trenches" Released: April 21, 2021

Street Sermons is the debut commercial mixtape by American rapper and singer Morray. It was released on April 28, 2021, by Pick Six Records and Interscope Records. The mixtape contains 13 tracks and it peaked at number 41 on the Billboard 200.

== Background ==
On April 16, 2021, Morray announced that he signed to Interscope, in a joint venture with Pick Six Records. His manager, Moe Shalizi spoke about the partnership, saying "there was so much synergy between our side and Interscope that it just felt right, we are really excited to be working with John Janick and the rest of the team." In an interview, Morray described the album, saying "I really want it to show more of my story and for people to get to know me more. I want it to be like, 'I listened to this and I understand why he does this.' This is supposed to be my reference to who I really am."

== Singles ==
On October 30, 2020, he released his first single "Quicksand", which charted on the Billboard Hot 100, and received co-signs from fellow North Carolina rappers J. Cole and DaBaby. The single amassed millions of streams and he was named on Billboard's Emerging Artists Spotlight. On November 20, 2020, he released the second single "Switched Up". In 2021, the third and fourth singles, "Big Decisions" and "Kingdom", were released.

On April 21, 2021, Morray released the fifth single "Trenches", a week ahead of the mixtape. The music video for "Can't Use Me" was released on April 28. On May 18, Morray made his television debut on Jimmy Kimmel Live. On May 24, he released the music video for "Nothing Now".

== Critical reception ==
Professional ratings
Review scores
| Source | Rating |
|---|---|
| Pitchfork | 6.9/10 |

In a positive review, Dylan Green of Pitchfork wrote "What makes Street Sermons largely so engaging is Morray's voice. It's a gritty tone that doesn't sound strained as he leaps from mid to high range with frightening ease. It even energizes the handful of otherwise rote songs peppered throughout the project. Street Sermons only stumbles when Morray drifts from the personal touch of his best songs into message-mongering."

== Track listing ==
Street Sermons track listing
| No. | Title | Writer(s) | Producer(s) | Length |
|---|---|---|---|---|
| 1. | "Mistakes" | Morae Ruffin; Tomislav Ratešić; Joseph Boyden | Dystinkt Beats; SephGotTheWaves | 3:01 |
| 2. | "Trenches" | Ruffin; Kim Candilora II; Omar Gomez; Danny Snodgrass, Jr. | KC Supreme; The Beat Menace; Taz Taylor | 3:13 |
| 3. | "Quicksand" | Ruffin; Hagan Lange; Anthony Phillips | Hagan; Ant Chamberlain | 3:44 |
| 4. | "That's On God" | Ruffin; Gregory Hein; James Gutch | Jimmie Gutch | 2:18 |
| 5. | "Nothing Now" | Ruffin; Michael Woods; Patrick McManus; Michael McCall | Poly Boy | 3:08 |
| 6. | "Reflections" | Ruffin; Thomas Horton; David McDowell; Carter Bryson; Angelo Callari | Mike Woods; Pat McManus; Boston; Callari | 2:17 |
| 7. | "Big Decisions" | Ruffin; Daniel Couture | Danny Couture | 3:00 |
| 8. | "Can't Use Me" | Ruffin; Vid Vucenovic; Nikola Pejović | ForeignGotEm; Dzimi | 2:50 |
| 9. | "Kingdom" | Ruffin; Vucenovic; Pejović | ForeignGotEm; Dzimi | 2:26 |
| 10. | "Switched Up" | Ruffin; Andrej Marko; Peter Gogola | Andyr; DatBoiGetro | 2:49 |
| 11. | "Facade" | Ruffin; Chrïstopher Fränk; Norman Payne | P Crisco; DJ Chose | 2:23 |
| 12. | "Real Ones" | Ruffin; Payne | DJ Chose | 2:18 |
| 13. | "Bigger Things" | Ruffin; Marko; Peter Gogola; Benjamin Hubble | Andyr; DatBoiGetro; LayZBeats | 2:56 |
| Total length: | | | | 36:28 |

== Charts ==
Chart performance for Street Sermons
| Chart (2021) | Peak position |
|---|---|
| US Billboard 200 | 41 |
| US Top R&B/Hip-Hop Albums (Billboard) | 20 |
