= The Off-Season =

2021 studio album by J. Cole

Studio album by J. Cole
- Released: May 14, 2021
- Recorded: 2018–2021
- Studio: The Sheltuh (Raleigh, North Carolina)
- Genre: Hip-hop
- Length: 39:03
- Labels: Dreamville; Roc Nation; Interscope
- Producers: Boi-1da; Coleman; DJ Dahi; Don Mills; DrtWrk; Frank Dukes; Jake One; J. Cole; Maneesh; Mario Luciano; Sucuki; Tae Beast; Fresh Dominic; Wilky Way; Timbaland; Moss Da Producer; T-Minus; Tommy Parker; Wu10

J. Cole chronology
Lewis Street (2020)	The Off-Season (2021)	Might Delete Later (2024)

Singles from The Off-Season
- 1. "My Life" Released: May 25, 2021

The Off-Season is the sixth studio album by American rapper J. Cole. It was released on May 14, 2021, by Dreamville Records, Roc Nation and Interscope Records. The album was executive produced by Cole, Ibrahim Hamad, and T-Minus. It also features guest vocals from Morray, 21 Savage, Lil Baby, Bas, and 6lack. Production was handled by multiple producers, including Cole himself, T-Minus, Timbaland, Boi-1da, Frank Dukes, DJ Dahi, Tae Beast, and Jake One, among others.

The Off-Season was supported by one single, "My Life", and promotional singles, "The Climb Back" and "Interlude". The Off-Season was accompanied by a twelve-minute short film upon its release titled, Applying Pressure: The Off-Season Documentary.

The Off-Season received positive reviews from critics and topped the US Billboard 200. It sold 282,000 album-equivalent units in its first week, earning Cole his sixth consecutive number-one album in the country. At the time of its release, The Off-Season achieved the largest streaming week of 2021, accumulating over 325.5 million streams. Four songs from The Off-Season debuted in the top ten on the US Billboard Hot 100; every song on the album charted in the top forty. The album scored a nomination for Best Rap Album at the 64th Annual Grammy Awards. Also, "Pride Is the Devil" was nominated for Best Melodic Rap Performance, while "My Life" was nominated for Best Rap Song and Best Rap Performance.

== Background ==
On August 7, 2018, Cole released "Album of the Year (Freestyle)", accompanied by a music video. Cole announced The Off-Season, which will precede the release of what was originally planned to be his sixth studio album, The Fall-Off. In the description to the video, it reads: "The Off Season coming soon... All roads lead to The Fall Off - Cole". In an interview with Billboard in September 2018, Cole announced his plans to take off time in 2019 from touring to finish work on The Off-Season, The Fall-Off, and his Kill Edward project.

On December 29, 2020, Cole posted a photo on Instagram where he documented a list titled, "The Fall Off Era". On the list crossed out, was features and Revenge of the Dreamers III. Also listed, but not crossed out was two projects, The Off-Season and It's a Boy, which he intends to release ahead of The Fall-Off. The caption of the post read: "I still got some goals I gotta check off for' I scram...", alluding to a potential retirement.

== Recording and production ==
As one of the executive producers of the album, T-Minus began producing with Cole in 2017, collaborating on "Kevin's Heart", "Middle Child", and "Lion King on Ice". He spoke on producing for Cole in an interview saying, "Cole is very much a producer, so he likes to direct where the music is going as far as arrangement, or the bounce, or the feeling that he wants to have. So he gave me a bunch of ideas and pointers for what he wanted to do." When asked about Cole's creative mindset for the mixtape, he said: "Cole is tapped into every aspect of the creation of the record. He writes all of his own music, writes all of the songs. He produces, he mixes; he's super involved [...] he's just that guy who's very grounded when it comes to the creation of the entire record, which is dope because when I create with him, he's very much directing where he wants the record to go."

== Artwork and title ==
The cover art was organized by Dreamville's creative director Felton Brown and shot in North Carolina by Justin Francis. The artwork shows Cole standing in front of a basketball hoop on fire, referencing the basketball theme on the covers of his mixtapes The Warm Up (2009) and Friday Night Lights (2010), and debut album Cole World: The Sideline Story (2011). Brown told Complex magazine:

We finished the album artwork two weeks before we announced it. We flew down to North Carolina and went through a few different renditions of creative and it got down to where the album was creatively, sonically, and the overall tone. We wanted something that was a little more encompassing of the whole feel of the album, so because of that, we had to go back [to North Carolina] again. Basically, Ib [Hamad] had an idea that he wanted me to flesh out, and usually that process—the vetting, figuring out who we’re going to use—takes some time, but because we didn’t have any time I knew I had to lean on things that I trust. We can’t fly him [J. Cole] somewhere to shoot it, so we’re going to shoot close to home. We leaned inwards. We reached out to Scott [Lazer], and he recommended a production team that we got, and I reached out to a close friend of mine who is an incredible photographer that I’ve worked with in my years in advertising named Justin Francis. He’s an incredible photographer, director, and cinematographer. I was just like, “Look, it’s fourth quarter, I need someone who’s super multi-disciplinary like me and who’s very agile on his feet,” and we talked through the whole night about the project and idea, put together a crazy presentation, and sent it to Cole and Ib. I wanted to meet and talk about it on the phone, but Cole was like, “Nah, that looks good. Let’s just get to it,” which was great because usually he’d want to talk about it. But I’m thinking, since he’s finishing recording it anyway, he looked at the game plan and saw it was solid, and he just gave me the blessing. We hit the ground running, Justin brought out this $50,000 camera, we got the pyrotechnic guys and got going.

On May 10, 2021, it was announced that J. Cole signed a contract with the Rwanda Patriots in the Basketball Africa League. Cole was also featured on the cover of the American basketball magazine Slam for the May 2021 issue. Cole explained the title of the mixtape, relating it to his basketball career saying:

The Off-Season symbolizes the work that it takes to get to the highest height. The Off-Season represents the many hours and months and years it took to get to top form. Just like in basketball, what you see him do in the court, that shit was worked on in the summertime. So for an athlete, if they take their career seriously and if they really got high goals and want to chase them, the offseason is where the magic really happens, where the ugly shit really happens, where the pain happens, the pushing yourself to uncomfortable limits.

== Release and promotion ==
On November 8, 2018, Cole made a playlist on streaming services titled, Where the fuck is The Off Season, which contains all of his 2018 features. The playlist also includes Jeezy's song "American Dream" (2017), J. Cole's singles "Everybody Dies" (2016), "False Prophets" (2016), "High for Hours" (2017), "Album of the Year (Freestyle)" (2018), and "1985" (2018).

On May 4, 2021, J. Cole officially announced the release date of the album on social media, and revealed the artwork. On May 10, 2021, Cole released a documentary titled, Applying Pressure: The Off-Season Documentary via YouTube. The short film is divided into four chapters where Cole shares a behind the scenes look in the studio as well as private moments during the album's creating process. The film was executive produced by Cole himself, Ibrahim Hamad, and Tripp Kramer, and directed by Scott Lazer. The film features a cameo from fellow rapper 21 Savage. While describing the inspiration of the mixtape, Cole said in the documentary:

This is the moment that a lot of your favorite rappers hit a crossroads. Are you okay with getting comfortable? Did you leave no stone unturned creatively? And when I thought about that feeling, I was like, 'Nah, I'm not cool with that.'

On May 13, 2021, hours prior to its release, Cole revealed the album's tracklist and production credits via social media.

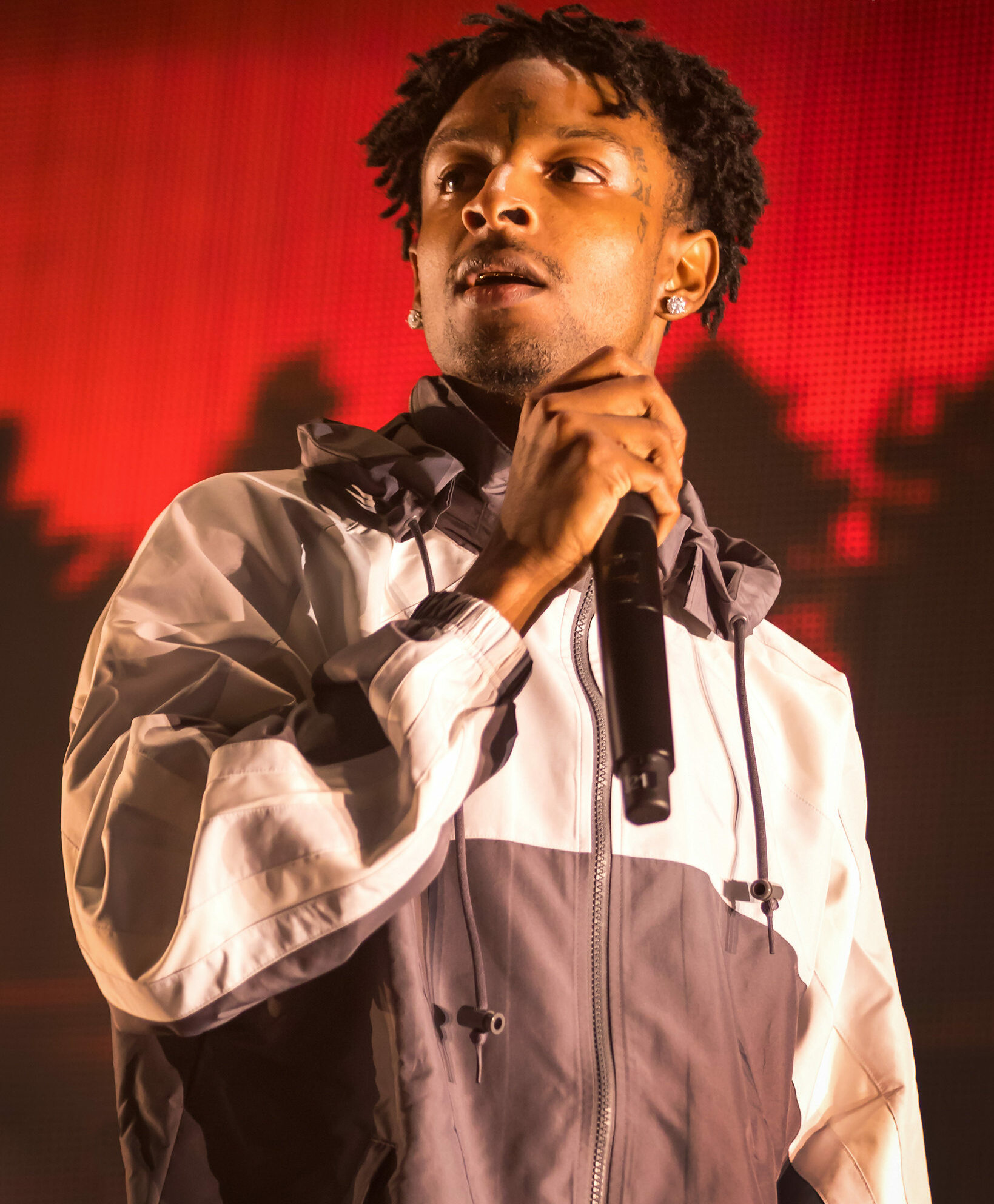
Atlanta-based rapper 21 Savage made an appearance on the album's single, "My Life".

=== Tour ===
To further promote the album, Cole announced The Off-Season Tour on June 22, 2021. The tour included 20 North American dates, and began on September 24, 2021 in Miami and concluded on April 3, 2022, in Raleigh at the Dreamville festival. 21 Savage served as the co-headliner and Morray served as their supporting act on the tour.

=== Singles ===
"My Life", with 21 Savage and Morray, impacted rhythmic contemporary radio in the United States on May 25, 2021, as the album's first official radio single. It debuted and peaked at number two on the Hot 100.

=== Other songs ===
On July 22, 2020, Cole released "The Climb Back" as a dual single along with, "Lion King on Ice", under the title Lewis Street. According to Cole, the two songs were originally intended to be the first singles from his upcoming album The Fall-Off. "The Climb Back" is included on the album.

On May 7, 2021, Cole released "Interlude", the first promotional single from the album, initially planning on releasing the album all at once with no singles prior to its release, as he had done in the past starting with his third studio album, 2014 Forest Hills Drive. The interlude was produced by T-Minus, Tommy Parker, and Cole himself. In the US, the song debuted with 8.5 million on-demand audio streams in its first day. It also reached number one on US Apple Music in less than a day. "Interlude" debuted and peaked at number eight on the US Billboard Hot 100.

On May 17, 2021, the music video was released for the song, "Amari", the video was directed by Raleigh-based rapper Mez, who also directed the music video for Cole's 2019 hit and multi-platinum single, "Middle Child". Cole released the music video for the song, "Applying Pressure" on May 25, 2021, and a music video for "Punchin' the Clock" on June 3, 2021. Both videos were directed by Scott Lazer and produced by Tripp Kramer. "Applying Pressure" features an appearance from rapper Dave East, who Cole also made a reference to in the song. All three music videos were filmed in New York City.

== Critical reception ==
Professional ratings
Aggregate scores
Source	Rating
AnyDecentMusic?	7.2/10
Metacritic	76/100
Review scores
Source	Rating
AllMusic	4/5 stars
Clash	9/10
Exclaim!	8/10
HipHopDX	3.8/5
NME	3/5 stars
Pitchfork	6.5/10
Rolling Stone	3.5/5 stars
Sputnikmusic	3.7/5
Tom Hull – on the Web	B+
Vinyl Chapters	4/5

The Off-Season was met with positive reception from music critics. At Metacritic, which assigns a normalized rating out of 100 to reviews from professional publications, the album received an average score of 76, based on ten reviews, indicating "generally favorable reviews". Aggregator AnyDecentMusic? gave it 7.2 out of 10, based on their assessment of the critical consensus.

Clash gave the album a positive review saying, Cole "reached astronomical heights. Fortunately for fans, they did not have to wait long, and the North Carolina rapper did not disappoint." The writer continued to say "The Off-Season is a solid project with no expiration date and can easily be digested for months and years to come. While some fans may be eager for more, The Off-Season is a great appetiser for the main dish and contains just enough for those that have been waiting for three years on The Real." Writing for Exclaim!, Luke Fox praised the album, calling Cole "refocused and rejuvenated", he continued saying: "If 2018's concept-heavy, dangerously didactic KOD was Cole drifting into the player-coach stage of his career, The Off-Season is Cole lacing up squeaky high-tops and drilling 100,000 hours of threes".

Variety's Brandon Yu wrote the following: "Particularly as hip-hop continues to transform as the new pop, Cole, a steadfast rap traditionalist now a good decade into his career, might appear as a relic (for some fans, the generation-war of his "1985" read as this very truth). On "The Off-Season," he is burnishing a reputation as a lingering titan. If "The Off-Season" is Cole's first record of The Fall Off Era, he appears far from ready to bow out, nor should he be." Yoh Phillips of Complex called the album a "workout session", he wrote, "The Off-Season sets Cole up to create the conversation about his place in rap history, and he'll need to deliver a blockbuster finale to fulfill the premonition he made 11 years ago on "Last Call." Craig Jenkins of Vulture said: "As the title suggests, The Off-Season is sort of a training montage, a blade-sharpening exercise like Drake's If You're Reading This It's Too Late in its core objective of showing the work it takes to stay on top while cultivating buzz for a future release (in this case, Cole's forthcoming The Fall-Off) – and maybe notching a few more hit records along the way." Writing for AllMusic, Fred Thomas said, "The album is a varied selection with solid performances and production throughout. Much like the title suggests, The Off-Season feels like Cole running through different exercises as he gets in shape for something bigger."

=== Accolades ===
Accolades for The Off-Season
Publication	List	Rank	Ref.
AllHipHop	AllHipHop’s 20 Best Albums Of 2021	—N/a	
American Urban Radio Networks	11 Best Hip Hop Albums of 2021	2	
Billboard	The 20 Best Hip-Hop Albums of 2021: Critics’ Picks	5	
Complex	The Best Albums of 2021 (So Far)	1	
Complex	The Best Albums of 2021	2	
HipHopDX	The Top Hip Hop Albums of 2021 (December – June)	—N/a	
HipHopDX	Best Hip Hop Albums of 2021	—N/a	
HotNewHipHop	Top 30 Hottest Hip-Hop Albums Of 2021	4	
Power 106 FM	Top 12 Hip-Hop Albums Of 2021	—N/a	
Revolt TV	11 top rap albums of 2021	—N/a	
NPR	The 25 Best Hip-Hop Albums of 2021	—N/a	
Rolling Stone	The 20 Best Hip-Hop Albums of 2021	20	
Vibe	The 21 Best Hip-Hop Albums Of 2021: Staff Picks	4	
Uproxx	The Best Hip-Hop Albums Of 2021	—N/a	
XXL	Best Hip-Hop Projects of 2021	—N/a	
Yardbarker	The best hip-hop albums of 2021	—N/a	

=== Industry awards ===
Awards and nominations for The Off-Season
Year	Organization	Award	Result	Ref.
2021	BET Hip Hop Awards	Album of the Year	Nominated	
2022	Grammy Awards	Best Rap Album	Nominated	
2022	iHeart Radio Music Awards	Hip Hop Album of the Year	Won	

== Commercial performance ==
On the day of its release, The Off-Season broke Spotify's one-day streaming record for 2021 up until that point with 62 million streams. In the United States, the album debuted at number one on the US Billboard 200, earning 282,000 album-equivalent units (including 37,000 copies as pure album sales) in its first week. This became Cole's seventh US number one album on the chart. At the time of its release, The Off-Season achieved the largest streaming week of 2021, accumulating over 325.5 million on-demand streams of the album's 12 tracks, surpassing Morgan Wallen’s Dangerous: The Double Album which debuted with 240.18 million streams for its 30 songs in its first week. The project also earned the largest week of 2021 for a hip-hop album, until being surpassed by Kanye West’s album Donda. and Drake's album Certified Lover Boy. In its second week, the album dropped to number two on the chart, earning an additional 92,000 units, while losing the number one position to Olivia Rodrigo's debut album, Sour. In its third week, the album dropped to number three on the chart, earning 58,000 more units. In its fourth week, the album dropped to number four on the chart, earning 44,000 units. As of December 2021, the album has earned over 1,000,000 album-equivalent units in the United States.

Four songs from The Off-Season debuted in the top ten on the US Billboard Hot 100, with "My Life" (at 2), "Amari" (at 5), "Pride Is the Devil" (at 7), and "95 South" (at 8). Drake, Juice WRLD, Lil Wayne & Lil Uzi Vert are the only other artists to have four songs debut in the top ten. "Interlude" debuted at number eight the previous week giving the album five top ten singles. Every song on the album charted in the top forty on the Hot 100.

== Track listing ==
The Off-Season track listing
No.	Title	Writer(s)	Producer(s)	Length
1.	"95 South"	Jermaine Cole; Matthew Samuels; Scotty Coleman; Maneesh Bidaye; Jonathan Smith; Sammie Norris	Boi-1da; Coleman; Maneesh^{[a]}	3:16
2.	"Amari"	Cole; Timothy Mosley; Tim Friedrich; Tyler Williams	Timbaland; Rodney Moss; Sucuki; J. Cole^{[a]}; T-Minus^{[a]}	2:28
3.	"My Life" (with 21 Savage and Morray)	Cole; Shéyaa Abraham-Joseph; Jacob Dutton; Kelvin Wooten; David Styles; Troy Jamerson; Lamont Dorrell; Walter McDaniel; Wendell Baker; Alonzo Bates III; Steve Glenn; Michael Smith	Jake One; Cole; Wu10^{[a]}	3:38
4.	"Applying Pressure"	Cole	Cole	2:57
5.	"Punchin' the Clock"	Cole; Donte Perkins; Mario Luciano Dragoi; Nichol Eskridge; Jabrile Williams	Tae Beast; Mario Luciano	1:52
6.	"100 Mil'" (with Bas)	Cole; T. Williams; Brian Evans; Melanesia Hendrickson; Mel Hugee	Cole; T-Minus	2:43
7.	"Pride Is the Devil" (with Lil Baby)	Cole; Dominique Jones; T. Williams; Adam Daniel	T-Minus	3:38
8.	"Let Go My Hand" (with Bas and 6lack)	Cole; Abbas Hamad; Dacoury Natche; Adam Feeney; Wooten	DJ Dahi; Frank Dukes; Cole^{[a]}; Wu10^{[a]}	4:26
9.	"Interlude"	Cole; T. Williams; Thomas Lumpkins; Hamad	Cole; T-Minus; Tommy Parker	2:13
10.	"The Climb Back"	Cole; Gary Bailey; Maximilian Axelrod; Montey Bailey	Cole	5:06
11.	"Close"	Cole; Gloria Jones; Pamela Sawyer	Cole	2:48
12.	"Hunger on Hillside" (with Bas)	Cole; Hamad; Samuels; Michal Suski; Milos Angelov; Junior Parker	Boi-1da; DrtWrk; Don Mills	3:58
Total length:				39:03

Notes

- ^{^[a]} signifies an additional producer
- All track titles are stylized in all lowercase and are letter spaced with a period between words. For example, "My Life" is stylized as "m y . l i f e".

Sample credits

- "95 South" contains samples of "Throw It Up" and "Put Your Hood Up", written by Jonathan Smith and Sammie Norris, and performed by Lil Jon & the East Side Boyz.
- "My Life" interpolates "The Life", written by David Styles, Troy Jamerson, Lamont Dorell and Steve Glenn, and performed by Styles P and Pharoahe Monch and a sample of "You Can’t Hurry God" performed by Rev. Walter McDaniel and The Gospel Wind.
- "Applying Pressure” contains a sample from "Calafia" performed by Gerald Wilson Orchestra of the 80's.
- "Punching the Clock" contains a sample of a post game interview from Damian Lillard.
- "100 Mil'" contains a sample from "There's Something Missing", written by Brian Evans, Melanesia Hendrickson (a.k.a. Gene Hendricks) and Mel Hugee, and performed by Double Exposure.
- "The Climb Back" contains a sample from "I'm So In Love With You”, written by Gary Bailey, Maximillian Axelrod and Montey Bailey, and performed by Brief Encounter.
- "Close" contains a sample from "Do It Again", written by Gloria Jones and Pamela Sawyer, and performed by The New Birth.
- "Hunger on Hillside" contains a sample from "I Wonder Where Our Love Has Gone” written and performed by Junior Parker.

== Personnel ==
Credits adapted from Tidal.

Vocals

- Cam'ron – additional vocals (1)
- Lil Jon – additional vocals (1)
- Damian Lillard – additional vocals (5)
- TS Rose – additional vocals (7)
- Diddy – additional vocals (8)

Technical

- Juro "Mez" Davis – mixer
- Mike Bozzi – mastering engineer
- Kuldeep Chudasama – recording engineer
- Kaleb Rollins – vocal producer (tracks 6, 8, 12)

== Charts ==
=== Weekly charts ===
Weekly chart performance for The Off-Season
Chart (2021–2022)	Peak position
Australian Albums (ARIA)	3
Austrian Albums (Ö3 Austria)	2
Belgian Albums (Ultratop Flanders)	1
Belgian Albums (Ultratop Wallonia)	7
Canadian Albums (Billboard)	1
Czech Albums (ČNS IFPI)	19
Danish Albums (Hitlisten)	1
Dutch Albums (Album Top 100)	1
Finnish Albums (Suomen virallinen lista)	4
French Albums (SNEP)	33
German Albums (Offizielle Top 100)	16
Irish Albums (Official Charts)	1
Italian Albums (FIMI)	23
Lithuanian Albums (AGATA)	1
New Zealand Albums (RMNZ)	1
Norwegian Albums (VG-lista)	1
Portuguese Albums (AFP)	49
Slovak Albums (ČNS IFPI)	7
Spanish Albums (Promusicae)	30
Swedish Albums (Sverigetopplistan)	2
Swiss Albums (Schweizer Hitparade)	5
UK Albums (Official Charts)	2
UK R&B Albums (Official Charts)	2
US Billboard 200	1
US Top R&B/Hip-Hop Albums (Billboard)	1

=== Year-end charts ===
2021 year-end chart performance for The Off-Season
Chart (2021)	Position
Australian Albums (ARIA)	70
Belgian Albums (Ultratop Flanders)	97
Canadian Albums (Billboard)	40
Dutch Albums (Album Top 100)	81
Icelandic Albums (Tónlistinn)	96
New Zealand Albums (RMNZ)	29
US Billboard 200	28
US Top R&B/Hip-Hop Albums (Billboard)	14

2022 year-end chart performance for The Off-Season
Chart (2022)	Position
US Billboard 200	114
US Top R&B/Hip-Hop Albums (Billboard)	86

== Certifications ==
Region	Certification	Certified units/sales
Denmark (IFPI Danmark)	Gold	10,000^{‡}
New Zealand (RMNZ)	Gold	7,500^{‡}
United Kingdom (BPI)	Gold	100,000^{‡}
United States (RIAA)	Platinum	1,000,000^{‡}
^{‡} Sales+streaming figures based on certification alone.

== Release history ==
List of release dates, showing region, format(s), label(s) and reference(s)
Region	Date	Format	Label	Ref.
Various	May 14, 2021	digital download; streaming	Dreamville; Roc Nation; Interscope	
Various	July 16, 2021	CD	Dreamville; Roc Nation; Interscope	
Various	August 27, 2021	Vinyl LP	Dreamville; Roc Nation; Interscope	

== See also ==
- 2021 in hip-hop
- List of Billboard 200 number-one albums of 2021
- Applying Pressure: The Off-Season Documentary
