= Amari (song) =

2021 song by J. Cole

Song by J. Cole

from the album The Off-Season
- Genre: Hip hop; trap
- Length: 2:28
- Label: Dreamville; Roc Nation; Interscope
- Songwriter: Jermaine Cole
- Producers: Timbaland; Sucuki; J. Cole; T-Minus

Music video
- "Amari" on YouTube

"Amari" (stylized as "a m a r i") is a song by American rapper J. Cole. It was released on May 14, 2021 on Cole's sixth studio album, The Off-Season.

== Background ==
The song title, "Amari", is named after Dreamville president and manager Ibrahim Hamad's son, also the nephew of Dreamville rapper Bas.

Even though the song is named for the son of Hamad, his name does not ever appear in the actual lyrics, and he is never referenced in the song itself. It’s believed that Cole’s goal with the song was to emphasize personal relationships help make music even if the listener does not hear or see the impact from those connections.

== Production and composition ==
J. Cole revealed how the song was created on Timbaland's BeatClub YouTube channel. The song was produced during a Twitch live stream by Timbaland. When Cole heard it, he contemplated reaching out, but wrote to the beat through a rip on the internet. He said "I looped up the YouTube lil' rip, made a whole song on this shit. I spent the next two days writing and recording the song, and right when I was 90% through writin' it, I was like, I should probably call him now and get the real file." After asking for the file and playing the song, Timbaland said he didn't save the beat and had to remake it.

== Music video ==
On May 17, 2021, Cole released the official music video for "Amari" directed by fellow North Carolina rapper Mez, who also directed the "Middle Child" video. Scenes in the video features Cole rapping in front of a Dreamville helicopter and in a dorm-room with the wall lined with platinum plaques. A message saying "hold on to your inner child," reads at the end.

== Critical reception ==
Writing for HipHopDX, Clark Trent said, "The Timbaland-assisted 'Amari' proves the magic ultimately falls on the beatpicker as T-Minus, Sucuki and Cole all combine for a relatively limp staccato blitz of guitar loops." Clash said Cole reflects "on his success and how he made it out even through trials and tribulations." Rolling Stone said the song was a standout on the album "as [J. Cole] alternates between agile rapping and serious singing."

== Commercial performance ==
Upon its first week of release, "Amari" debuted at number 5 on the US Billboard Hot 100, becoming his third top five song on the chart.

== Charts ==
Chart performance for "Amari"
Chart (2021)	Peak position
Australia (ARIA)	14
Canada Hot 100 (Billboard)	7
Lithuania (AGATA)	40
New Zealand (Recorded Music NZ)	12
Sweden (Sverigetopplistan)	58
UK Singles (Official Charts)	16
US Billboard Hot 100	5
US Hot R&B/Hip-Hop Songs (Billboard)	3

== Certifications ==
Region	Certification	Certified units/sales
Australia (ARIA)	Gold	35,000^{‡}
United Kingdom (BPI)	Silver	200,000^{‡}
United States (RIAA)	Platinum	1,000,000^{‡}
^{‡} Sales+streaming figures based on certification alone.
