= The Jackie =

2021 single by Bas and J. Cole featuring Lil Tjay

Single by Bas and J. Cole featuring Lil Tjay

from the EP [BUMP] Pick Me Up
- Released: July 9, 2021
- Genre: Trap
- Length: 3:24
- Label: Dreamville; Interscope
- Songwriters: Abbas Hamad; Jermaine Cole; Tione Merritt; Tyler Williams
- Producer: T-Minus

Bas singles chronology
"Romeo" (2021)	"The Jackie" (2021)	"Spill" (2021)

J. Cole singles chronology
"My Life" (2021)	"The Jackie" (2021)	"Your Heart" (2021)

Lil Tjay singles chronology
"Swallowa" (2021)	"The Jackie" (2021)	"Dreams Unfold" (2021)

Music video
- "The Jackie" on YouTube

"The Jackie" is a song by American rappers Bas and J. Cole featuring fellow American rapper Lil Tjay. It was released on July 9, 2021, with an accompanying music video, and was produced by T-Minus.

== Background ==
Dreamville Records teased the song on July 6, 2021 on social media, calling it a "summer anthem". "The Jackie" refers to Jackie Robinson Parkway.

== Composition ==
The melodic song features a "bouncy" beat produced by T-Minus. It begins with a chorus from J. Cole, with the lyrics "You see the drop top, bitch / Stop playing with me / She say she wanna let the waves splash down on me". Bas then sings the first verse, starting with "I'm on the way, send me the addy, I'm on the Jackie / Five on the belt, ten on the jacket, you gotta have me / It's been a day, I don't wanna wait no more". Lil Tjay handles the next verse, and Cole sings the last verse with eight lines.

== Critical reception ==
Abby Jones of Consequence called the song "a caffeinated, heavy-hitting trap song that acts as an ode of sorts to New York summer nights". Brad Callas of Complex wrote that Bas' "sing-song opening verse pairs well with Tjay's signature melodic approach". Sophie Caraan called the chorus "catchy", and wrote that the "imposing" verses from Bas and Lil Tjay "sound like they're currently at the top of their game". Wongo Okon of Uproxx described the track as "extremely confident".

== Music video ==
The music video, directed by John Tashiro, shows J. Cole as an Uber driver equipped with snacks and drinks. He picks up Bas and his girlfriend in an old school convertible and cruises around New York City before going to a party. Mark Phillips of RDCWorld, a content-creating group, appears in the video, in which he recreates a viral meme of J. Cole: he approaches Cole and calls him by his real name, then asks for an autograph before Cole drives away.

== Charts ==
Chart (2021)	Peak position
Canada Hot 100 (Billboard)	60
New Zealand Hot Singles (RMNZ)	7
UK Singles (Official Charts)	100
US Billboard Hot 100	78
US Hot R&B/Hip-Hop Songs (Billboard)	26
US Rolling Stone Top 100	55
