= Billboard Year-End Hot 100 singles of 2021 =

Ranking of recorded music

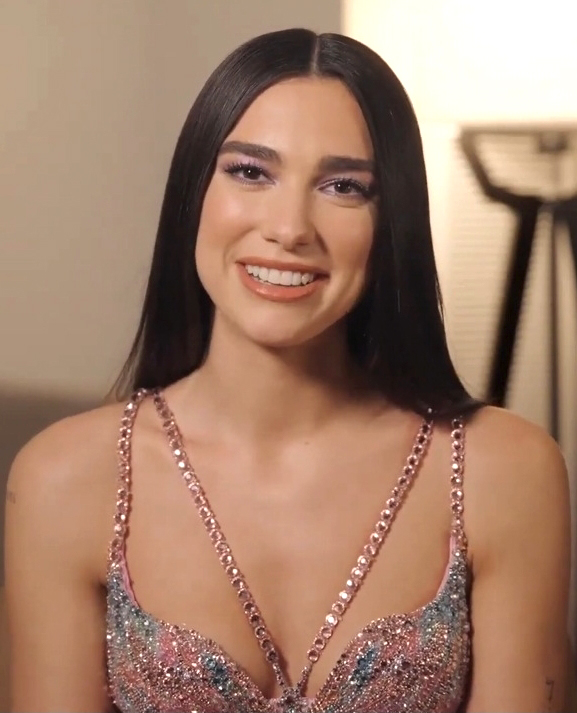
"Levitating" by Dua Lipa (pictured) came in at number one in the Year-End list, despite peaking at number two on the weekly Hot 100 chart. It became the first song to top a Year-End list without topping the weekly chart since Lifehouse's "Hanging by a Moment" in 2001.

The Billboard Hot 100 is a chart that ranks the best-performing singles of the United States. Its data, published by Billboard magazine and compiled by Nielsen SoundScan, is based collectively on each single's weekly physical and digital sales, as well as airplay and streaming. At the end of a year, Billboard will publish an annual list of the 100 most successful songs throughout that year on the Hot 100 chart based on the information. For 2021, the list was published on December 2, calculated with data from November 21, 2020 to November 13, 2021.

Billboard named Olivia Rodrigo the top Hot 100 artist of 2021, the youngest female artist to achieve this honor, and the first female artist since Katy Perry in 2014. Rodrigo placed four songs on the list, all in the top 40; the highest ranked of them, "Good 4 U", placed at number five.

== Year-end list ==
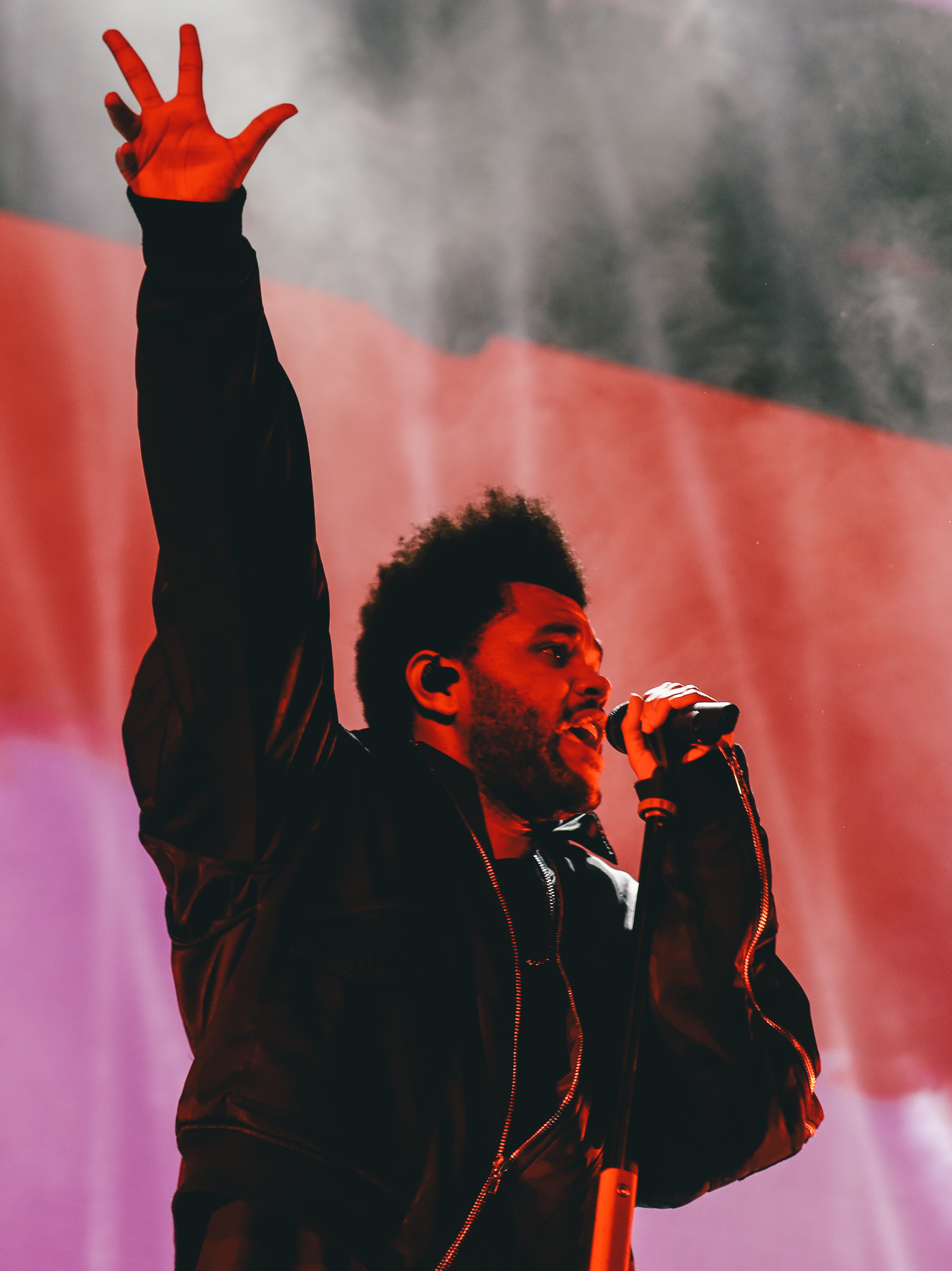
The Weeknd (pictured) has four songs on the Year-End list, with "Save Your Tears" (with Ariana Grande) and "Blinding Lights" ranking at #2 and #3; in addition, "Blinding Lights", previously the biggest performing song of 2020, was crowned by Billboard as the most successful Hot 100 single of all time, dethroning Chubby Checker's "The Twist".

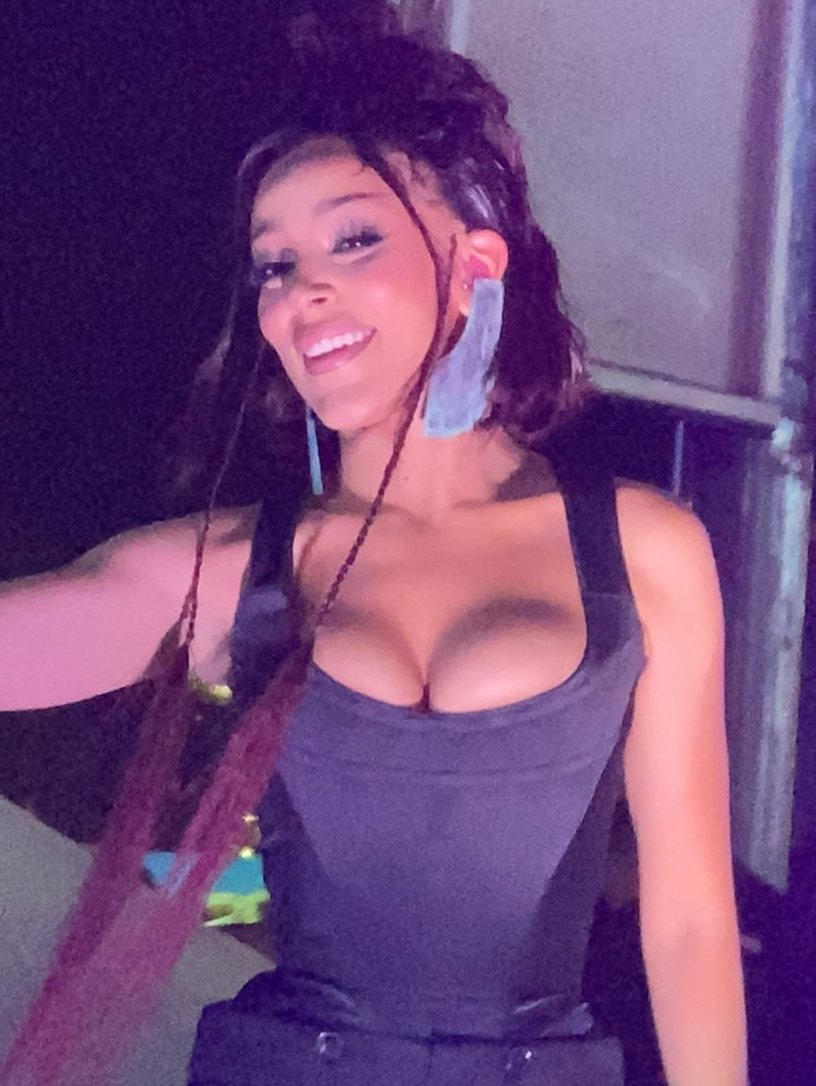
Doja Cat (pictured) ties Justin Bieber and Drake for the most songs on the list with six. "Kiss Me More" (featuring SZA) ranks the highest at number 6, while "34+35" (Ariana Grande featuring Doja Cat and Megan Thee Stallion), "Best Friend" (Saweetie featuring Doja Cat), "You Right" (with the Weeknd), "Need to Know", and "Streets" rank at number 21, number 29, number 43, number 46, and number 67 respectively.

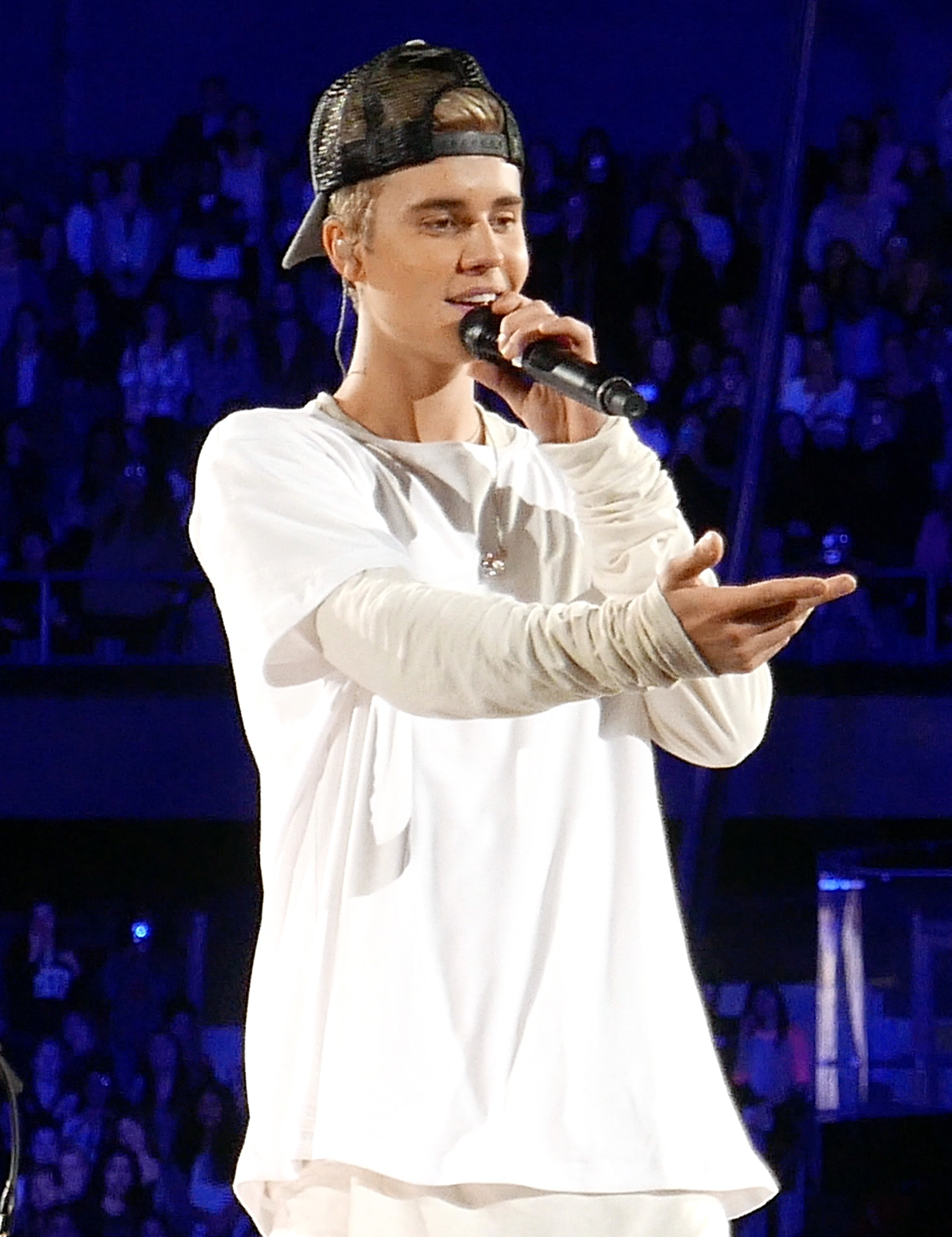
Justin Bieber (pictured) ties Doja Cat and Drake for the most songs on the list with six. His number ones "Peaches" (featuring Daniel Caesar and Giveon) and "Stay" (with the Kid Laroi) rank the highest at number 10 and number 12 respectively.

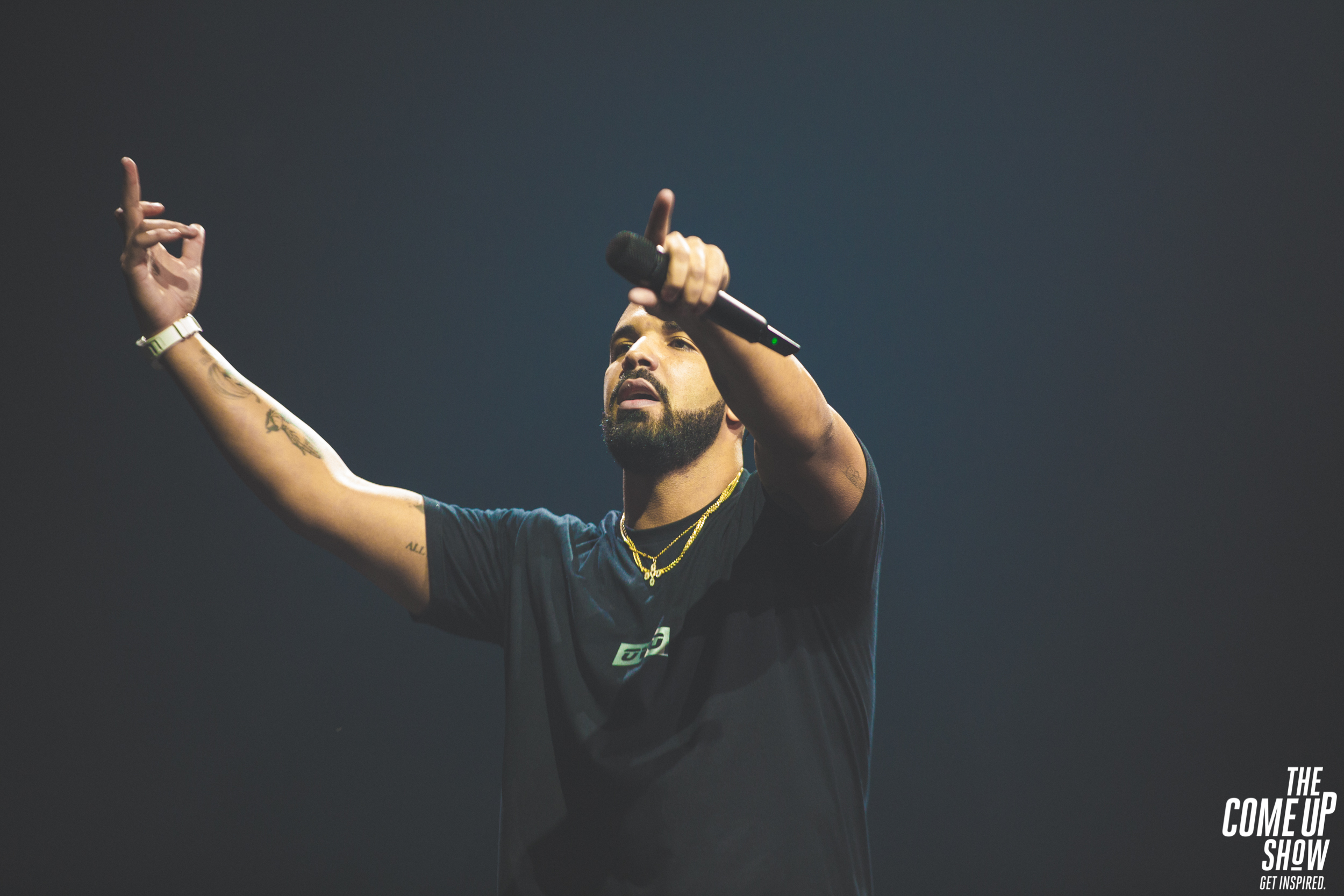
Drake (pictured) ties Doja Cat and Justin Bieber for the most songs on the list with six. "Laugh Now Cry Later" (featuring Lil Durk) ranks the highest at number 45, while his number ones "Way 2 Sexy" (featuring Future and Young Thug)" and "What's Next" rank at number 48 and number 68 respectively.

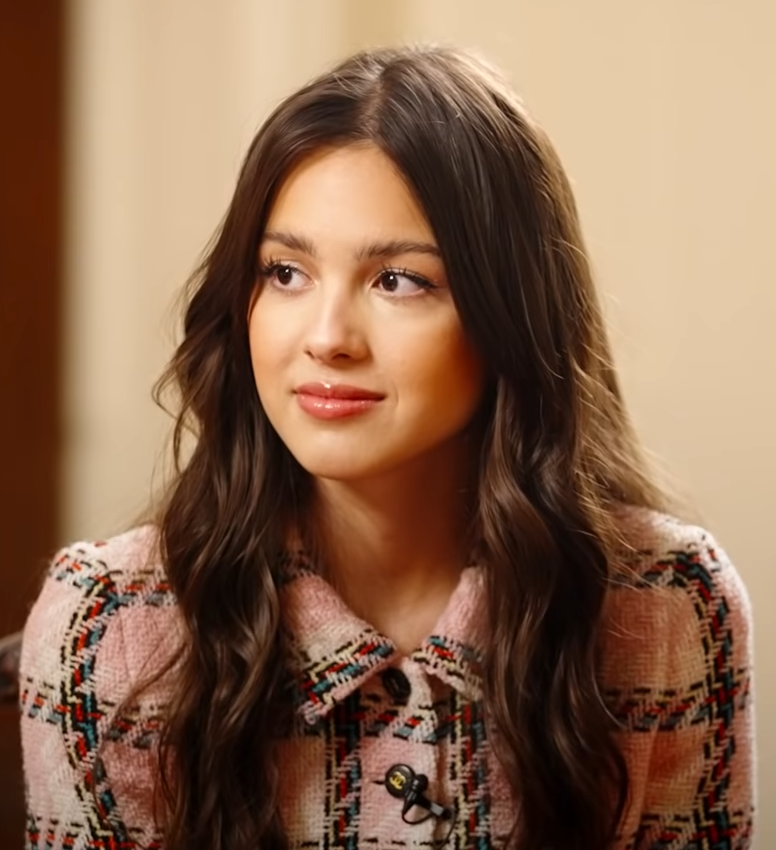
Four songs from Olivia Rodrigo's (pictured) debut studio album Sour rank within the top 40, with her number ones "Good 4 U" and "Drivers License" ranking within the top 10 at number 5 and number 8 respectively, while "Deja Vu" and "Traitor" rank at number 13 and number 38 respectively.

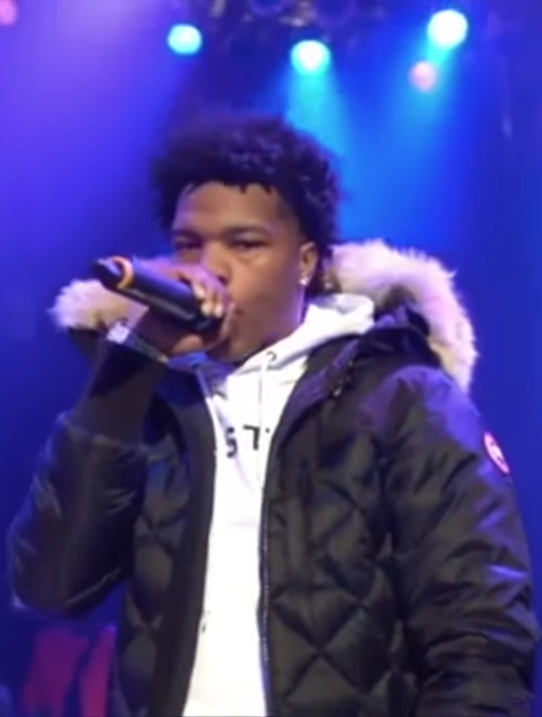
Lil Baby (pictured) has four songs on the list. "For the Night" (Pop Smoke featuring Lil Baby and DaBaby) ranks the highest at number 32, while "On Me", "Wants and Needs" (Drake featuring Lil Baby), and "Every Chance I Get" (DJ Khaled featuring Lil Baby and Lil Durk) rank at number 36, number 47, and number 59 respectively.

List of songs on Billboard's 2021 Year-End Hot 100 chart
No.	Title	Artist(s)
1	"Levitating"	Dua Lipa
2	"Save Your Tears"	The Weeknd and Ariana Grande
3	"Blinding Lights"	The Weeknd
4	"Mood"	24kGoldn featuring Iann Dior
5	"Good 4 U"	Olivia Rodrigo
6	"Kiss Me More"	Doja Cat featuring SZA
7	"Leave the Door Open"	Silk Sonic (Bruno Mars and Anderson .Paak)
8	"Drivers License"	Olivia Rodrigo
9	"Montero (Call Me by Your Name)"	Lil Nas X
10	"Peaches"	Justin Bieber featuring Daniel Caesar and Giveon
11	"Butter"	BTS
12	"Stay"	The Kid Laroi and Justin Bieber
13	"Deja Vu"	Olivia Rodrigo
14	"Positions"	Ariana Grande
15	"Bad Habits"	Ed Sheeran
16	"Heat Waves"	Glass Animals
17	"Without You"	The Kid Laroi
18	"Forever After All"	Luke Combs
19	"Go Crazy"	Chris Brown and Young Thug
20	"Astronaut in the Ocean"	Masked Wolf
21	"34+35"	Ariana Grande featuring Doja Cat and Megan Thee Stallion
22	"What You Know Bout Love"	Pop Smoke
23	"My Ex's Best Friend"	Machine Gun Kelly featuring Blackbear
24	"Industry Baby"	Lil Nas X and Jack Harlow
25	"Therefore I Am"	Billie Eilish
26	"Up"	Cardi B
27	"Fancy Like"	Walker Hayes
28	"Dakiti"	Bad Bunny and Jhay Cortez
29	"Best Friend"	Saweetie featuring Doja Cat
30	"Rapstar"	Polo G
31	"Heartbreak Anniversary"	Giveon
32	"For the Night"	Pop Smoke featuring Lil Baby and DaBaby
33	"Calling My Phone"	Lil Tjay and 6lack
34	"Beautiful Mistakes"	Maroon 5 featuring Megan Thee Stallion
35	"Holy"	Justin Bieber featuring Chance the Rapper
36	"On Me"	Lil Baby
37	"You Broke Me First"	Tate McRae
38	"Traitor"	Olivia Rodrigo
39	"Back in Blood"	Pooh Shiesty featuring Lil Durk
40	"I Hope"	Gabby Barrett featuring Charlie Puth
41	"Dynamite"	BTS
42	"Wockesha"	Moneybagg Yo
43	"You Right"	Doja Cat and the Weeknd
44	"Beat Box 2" / "Beat Box 3"	SpotemGottem featuring Pooh Shiesty / SpotemGottem featuring DaBaby
45	"Laugh Now Cry Later"	Drake featuring Lil Durk
46	"Need to Know"	Doja Cat
47	"Wants and Needs"	Drake featuring Lil Baby
48	"Way 2 Sexy"	Drake featuring Future and Young Thug
49	"Telepatía"	Kali Uchis
50	"Whoopty"	CJ
51	"Lemonade"	Internet Money and Gunna featuring Don Toliver and Nav
52	"Good Days"	SZA
53	"Starting Over"	Chris Stapleton
54	"Body"	Megan Thee Stallion
55	"Willow"	Taylor Swift
56	"Bang!"	AJR
57	"Better Together"	Luke Combs
58	"You're Mines Still"	Yung Bleu featuring Drake
59	"Every Chance I Get"	DJ Khaled featuring Lil Baby and Lil Durk
60	"Essence"	Wizkid featuring Justin Bieber and Tems
61	"Chasing After You"	Ryan Hurd and Maren Morris
62	"The Good Ones"	Gabby Barrett
63	"Leave Before You Love Me"	Marshmello and Jonas Brothers
64	"Glad You Exist"	Dan + Shay
65	"Lonely"	Justin Bieber and Benny Blanco
66	"Beggin'"	Måneskin
67	"Streets"	Doja Cat
68	"What's Next"	Drake
69	"Famous Friends"	Chris Young and Kane Brown
70	"Lil Bit"	Nelly and Florida Georgia Line
71	"Thot Shit"	Megan Thee Stallion
72	"Late at Night"	Roddy Ricch
73	"Kings & Queens"	Ava Max
74	"Anyone"	Justin Bieber
75	"Track Star"	Mooski
76	"Time Today"	Moneybagg Yo
77	"Cry Baby"	Megan Thee Stallion featuring DaBaby
78	"All I Want for Christmas Is You"	Mariah Carey
79	"No More Parties"	Coi Leray featuring Lil Durk
80	"What's Your Country Song"	Thomas Rhett
81	"One Too Many"	Keith Urban and Pink
82	"Arcade"	Duncan Laurence
83	"Yonaguni"	Bad Bunny
84	"Good Time"	Niko Moon
85	"If I Didn't Love You"	Jason Aldean and Carrie Underwood
86	"Knife Talk"	Drake featuring 21 Savage and Project Pat
87	"POV"	Ariana Grande
88	"Just the Way"	Parmalee and Blanco Brown
89	"Take My Breath"	The Weeknd
90	"We're Good"	Dua Lipa
91	"Hell of a View"	Eric Church
92	"Rockin' Around the Christmas Tree"	Brenda Lee
93	"Put Your Records On"	Ritt Momney
94	"Happier Than Ever"	Billie Eilish
95	"Single Saturday Night"	Cole Swindell
96	"Things a Man Oughta Know"	Lainey Wilson
97	"Throat Baby (Go Baby)"	BRS Kash
98	"Tombstone"	Rod Wave
99	"Drinkin' Beer. Talkin' God. Amen."	Chase Rice featuring Florida Georgia Line
100	"Todo de Ti"	Rauw Alejandro

== See also ==
- 2021 in American music
- Billboard Year-End Hot Rap Songs of 2021
- List of Billboard Hot 100 number ones of 2021
- List of Billboard Hot 100 top-ten singles in 2021
