= My Life (J. Cole, 21 Savage and Morray song) =

2021 song by J. Cole, 21 Savage and Morray

Single by J. Cole, 21 Savage and Morray

from the album The Off-Season
- Released: May 25, 2021
- Length: 3:38
- Label: Dreamville; Roc Nation; Interscope
- Songwriters: Jermaine Cole; Pharoahe Monch; Shéyaa Abraham-Joseph
- Producers: J. Cole; Jake One; Wu10

J. Cole singles chronology
"Interlude" (2021)	"My Life" (2021)	"The Jackie" (2021)

21 Savage singles chronology
"Let It Go" (2021)	"My Life" (2021)	"Knife Talk" (2021)

Morray singles chronology
"Trenches" (2021)	"My Life" (2021)

Audio video
- "My Life" on YouTube

"My Life" (stylized as "m y . l i f e") is a song by American rapper J. Cole, British-American rapper 21 Savage and fellow American rapper Morray. It is the third track from Cole's sixth studio album, The Off-Season, released on May 14, 2021. The song features the hook of "The Life" (2002) by American rapper Styles P, as interpolated by Morray. The song was sent to rhythmic contemporary radio in the United States on May 25, 2021, as the album's first single. The single debuted at number two on the Billboard Hot 100 chart, becoming Cole's highest charting single in the country as a lead artist (tying "All My Life" with Lil Durk), surpassing the number four peak of "Middle Child". It is also Morray’s highest-charting song, surpassing his single "Quicksand" which peaked at number 65 and 21 Savage's highest-charting song as a lead artist (tying "Rich Flex" with Drake), overall behind his features on Post Malone's number-one hit "Rockstar" and Drake's number-one hit "Jimmy Cooks".

The song received two nominations at the 64th Annual Grammy Awards for Best Rap Song and Best Rap Performance.

== Background ==
The song marks the second time Cole and Savage collaborated on a song, first time being "A Lot" (2019). Savage also appears in Cole's documentary Applying Pressure: The Off-Season. Cole and Morray were first linked in 2020, when Cole praised Morray's song "Quicksand", which led to speculations about a possible remix of the song.

== Composition ==
"My Life" features a notable switch-up in Cole's delivery, which starts "with a chilled out, melancholy feel" and changes to a "harder, razor-sharp tone". The lyrics see Cole and Savage exploring "how tragedy and hardship led them to develop strong characters", while "Morray's hook ties together the track with an homage to Styles P and Pharaohe Monch". Furthermore, Cole reflects his way of attaining financial success and wealth. In the context of the album, the song, along with "Applying Pressure", were seen as "playful statements of Cole's separation from other rappers". Cole name-drops American basketball player Ja Morant on the song.

== Critical reception ==
Carl Lammare of Billboard highlighted the contrast between Cole's and Savage's "styles and personalities", though both "prove how formidable they can be as a unit and that together, they can wreak havoc on any given track". Varun Krishan of The Indian Express praised the song, noting the "great lyrics, impeccable flow and excellent delivery" combined with a "smooth and soothing" hook, as well as a beat with a "vocal melody infused to it which enhances the sound to match the vibe the creators are trying to produce". Matthew Strauss at Pitchfork thought that neither Cole or 21 Savage had to adapt each other's style in order to fit on the song, instead the collaboration shows "that Cole wants to be seen as a connective tissue instead of some sort of anti-hype iconoclast". In comparison to the duo's first collaboration, Frazier Tharpe of GQ called the song "a banging companion".

== Awards and nominations ==
Year	Organization	Award	Result	Ref.
2022	Grammy Awards	Best Rap Performance	Nominated	
2022	Grammy Awards	Best Rap Song	Nominated	

== Charts ==
=== Weekly charts ===
Chart performance for "My Life"
Chart (2021)	Peak position
Australia (ARIA)	11
Austria (Ö3 Austria Top 40)	70
Canada Hot 100 (Billboard)	8
Global 200 (Billboard)	4
Ireland (IRMA)	12
Lithuania (AGATA)	42
Netherlands (Single Top 100)	44
New Zealand (Recorded Music NZ)	5
Portugal (AFP)	10
Slovakia (Singles Digitál Top 100)	93
Sweden (Sverigetopplistan)	66
Switzerland (Schweizer Hitparade)	34
UK Singles (Official Charts)	13
UK Hip Hop/R&B (Official Charts)	3
US Billboard Hot 100	2
US Hot R&B/Hip-Hop Songs (Billboard)	1
US Rhythmic Airplay (Billboard)	12

=== Year-end charts ===
Year-end chart performance for "My Life"
Chart (2021)	Position
US Hot R&B/Hip-Hop Songs (Billboard)	43

== Certifications ==
Region	Certification	Certified units/sales
Australia (ARIA)	Platinum	70,000^{‡}
Brazil (Pro-Música Brasil)	Gold	20,000^{‡}
New Zealand (RMNZ)	Platinum	30,000^{‡}
United Kingdom (BPI)	Silver	200,000^{‡}
United States (RIAA)	2× Platinum	2,000,000^{‡}
^{‡} Sales+streaming figures based on certification alone.
