= Interlude (J. Cole song) =

2021 single by J. Cole

Promotional single by J. Cole

from the album The Off-Season
- Released: May 7, 2021
- Length: 2:11
- Label: Dreamville; Roc Nation
- Songwriters: Jermaine Cole; Tyler Williams; Thomas Lumpkins
- Producers: J. Cole; T-Minus; Tommy Parker

Audio video
- "Interlude" on YouTube

"Interlude" (stylized as "i n t e r l u d e") is a song by American rapper J. Cole, released on May 7, 2021, as a promotional single from his sixth studio album, The Off-Season. A brief track, it consists of a single verse as J. Cole reflects on his come-up and status in the rap game. "Interlude" marked the first time Cole released a single prior to a studio album since 2013's "Power Trip" off Born Sinner.

== Background and composition ==
The song was announced by Cole via social media less than 11 hours before its release. Cole also shared that he did not initially plan on releasing a song before the album. It marked the first time in eight years that he released a single before an album.

During the just under two minute track, J. Cole raps over a soul sample, heavy drums, and his "signature" fast-paced hi-hats delivering melodic, "compact" rhymes about his state of mind, including, as noted by Billboard's Jason Lipshutz, the rap landscape, religion, personal pain and gun violence. He also boasts about his streaming numbers: "Cole World, niggas knowin' what it is / Just in case they don't, I show 'em what it is / In summer, I do real numbers / Couldn't dare touch it if they sold a double disc". Cole further pays homage to two late rappers, Pimp C and Nipsey Hussle, mentioning how they both died around the same age as Jesus (age 33-36), before rapping about being at his lowest and now rising to the top of his game. He also touches on gun violence. Andrew Sacher of Brooklyn Vegan summarized: "[The song] finds Cole delivering one long stream-of-consciousness verse over warped, vintage soul samples". Hip Hop Wired's D.L. Chandler analyzed the song as a "trademark chip-on-shoulders verse [...] along with some requisite shit talking at the end of the track".

== Critical reception ==
"Interlude" was very well received by music critics upon release. Complex's Jordan Rose said "If 'Interlude' is any indication of what The Off-Season has to offer, then [the album] should be scorching hot". Uproxx's Wongo Okon deemed Cole "confident as ever" on the song, while noting that the tracks' instrumental is "a bit distant from the sound Cole has given us over the years". Bella Morais of The Root wrote: "Coming out the gate with a critique on the ways Black people are treated in America, specifically Black mothers, while still keeping to the narrative of 'it might get better' emulates the same energy as his debut mixtape from 14-years-ago…only more political". Hip Hop Wired's D.L. Chandler found that "J. Cole deserves far more credit than he receives and it still appears as if he's not concerning himself with plumping up his ego and, instead, making music that means something". Hypebeast's Sophie Caraan lauded: "Sounding reinvigorated and more confident than ever, Cole uses "i n t e r l u d e" as a refresher course for listeners and an introduction to the next sonic echelon he's been prepping for the past three years". Vulture's Justin Curto opined: "The song does not, in fact, sound like an interlude — Cole delivers a full, motivated verse over a soul sample". Aleia Woods of XXL said the song finds Cole "coming out hard with a melodic flow over the sample-driven track". Erika Marie of HotNewHipHop called the song "fire", and said it finds "J. Cole in his bag as he spins clever bars over a T-Minus production". Devon Jefferson of HipHopDX said the rapper makes a "volatile return to his mythical lyrical form."

== Commercial performance ==
In the United States, the song debuted with 8.5 million on-demand audio streams in its first day. Following its first complete tracking week, the song debuted at number eight on both the Global 200 chart and the Billboard Hot 100 chart, earning Cole his first top ten entry on the former, and his sixth top ten entry on the latter.

== Charts ==
Chart performance for "Interlude"
Chart (2021)	Peak position
Australia (ARIA)	20
Belgium (Ultratip Bubbling Under Flanders)	19
Canada Hot 100 (Billboard)	16
Global 200 (Billboard)	8
Ireland (IRMA)	18
Lithuania (AGATA)	24
Netherlands (Single Top 100)	60
New Zealand (Recorded Music NZ)	7
Portugal (AFP)	17
Sweden (Sverigetopplistan)	69
Switzerland (Schweizer Hitparade)	56
UK Singles (Official Charts)	25
UK Hip Hop/R&B (Official Charts)	9
US Billboard Hot 100	8
US Hot R&B/Hip-Hop Songs (Billboard)	5

== Certifications ==
Region	Certification	Certified units/sales
Australia (ARIA)	Gold	35,000^{‡}
United States (RIAA)	Platinum	1,000,000^{‡}
^{‡} Sales+streaming figures based on certification alone.
