= 95 South (song) =

2021 song by J. Cole

Song by J. Cole

from the album The Off-Season
- Length: 3:16
- Label: Dreamville; Roc Nation; Interscope
- Songwriter: Jermaine Cole
- Producers: Boi-1da; Coleman

Audio video
- "95 South" on YouTube

"95 South" (stylized as "9 5 . s o u t h") is a song written and performed by American rapper J. Cole. It is the opening track of his sixth studio album, The Off-Season, released on May 14, 2021. The song features vocals by American rappers Cam'ron and Lil Jon, the former of which provides narration throughout the song. It was produced by Coleman and Boi-1da.

== Composition ==
"95 South" samples Jay-Z's "U Don't Know" (2001), a song featured on The Blueprint, as well as Bobby Byrd's "I'm Not to Blame" (1970). The title is a nod to Interstate 95, which ranges from New York City to Cole's home town Fayetteville, North Carolina. The lyrical content sees the rapper boasting his success, saying how he achieved multiplatinum records since the beginning of his career. He furthermore alluded to other rappers barely doing numbers despite releasing "thirty-song albums". Popular references include the Super Mario Bros., the doughnut company Krispy Kreme, and SpaghettiOs.

== Critical reception ==
Variety's Brandon Yu complimented the track for having "a glorious kind of pitbull grandiosity to both its production and to Cole's scoffing cockiness". Yu also noted the contrast between the impression that the albums gives off "that strain of a wiser star" and the opening track denying the listener "any notion of fatherly compassion". J. Bachelor from 92Q praised both Cole's and Cam'ron's presence on the song, saying that while Cam'ron "talks that talk the way only a Harlemite can", "Cole doesn't just fire a warning shot here, he empties the clip". Matthew Strauss at Pitchfork noted the "triumphant beat that echoes the JAY-Z classic "U Don't Know"", as well as "a boisterous Lil Jon & The East Side Boyz sample" at the end of the song. According to Carl Lammare of Billboard, "Cam's unexpected guest slot is a perfect way to kick off the 12-track collection". He further praised his guest appearance, saying how his "pseudo hype-man certainly gives the project a nice jolt, as he entertains fans with his trash-talking ways". Lamarre further suggested Cam to appear in more interludes. Jacob DeLawrence at Consequence opined that the song felt like a clearer start to the album than any of his previous openers, saying that "it's clear that we're getting a different J. Cole". Clash said the song "is a wake-up call for those that may need a reminder that Jermaine's pen and paper is lethal and have been for a long time. Drawing comparison to artists that release bloated albums for streams, Cole reiterates that he outsells with much less content proving once more that quality > quantity."

== Charts ==
Chart performance for "95 South"
Chart (2021)	Peak position
Australia (ARIA)	22
Canada Hot 100 (Billboard)	13
Global 200 (Billboard)	11
New Zealand Hot Singles (RMNZ)	5
Portugal (AFP)	33
Sweden (Sverigetopplistan)	94
UK Hip Hop/R&B (Official Charts)	10
US Billboard Hot 100	8
US Hot R&B/Hip-Hop Songs (Billboard)	6

== Certifications ==
Region	Certification	Certified units/sales
United States (RIAA)	Platinum	1,000,000^{‡}
^{‡} Sales+streaming figures based on certification alone.
