= Love All (song) =

2021 song by Drake featuring Jay-Z

Song by Drake featuring Jay-Z

from the album Certified Lover Boy
- Released: September 3, 2021
- Genre: Hip hop
- Length: 3:48
- Label: OVO; Republic
- Songwriters: Aubrey Graham; Shawn Carter; Ozan Yildirim; Dylan Cleary-Krell; Leon Thomas III; Khristopher Riddick-Tynes; Christopher Wallace; Sean Combs; Steven Jordan
- Producers: Oz; Dez Wright; Thomas

"Love All" is a song by Canadian rapper Drake from his sixth studio album Certified Lover Boy (2021). It features American rapper Jay-Z and was produced by Oz, Dez Wright and Leon Thomas III.

== Composition ==
The song contains a sample of "Life After Death (Intro)" by The Notorious B.I.G. In the lyrics, Drake and Jay-Z point out the negative factors associated with their fame, including a lack of loyalty toward them and people taking their kindness for weakness. Much of the content has been regarded as referring especially to Kanye West.

== Critical reception ==
The song was met with a mixed reception. Sam Moore of The Independent called it "drumless inertia". Writing for The Guardian, Alim Kheraj described the song as "sparse and underwhelming" and Jay-Z's verse "sleepy, barely present". Jeff Ihaza of Rolling Stone deemed the song as "overly dramatic" and particularly criticized the disses toward Kanye West, writing, "It carries all of the intensity of high school bickering, but with somehow even lower stakes."

Conversely, Erika Marie of HotNewHipHop gave the song a "Very Hottttt" rating.

== Charts ==
Chart performance for "Love All"
Chart (2021)	Peak position
Australia (ARIA)	12
Australia Hip-Hop/R&B Singles (ARIA)	9
Canada Hot 100 (Billboard)	20
Denmark (Tracklisten)	27
France (SNEP)	34
Global 200 (Billboard)	10
Greece International (IFPI)	38
Iceland (Tónlistinn)	36
Italy (FIMI)	82
Lithuania (AGATA)	35
Portugal (AFP)	23
South Africa (TOSAC)	4
Sweden (Sverigetopplistan)	57
UK Audio Streaming (Official Charts)	7
US Billboard Hot 100	10
US Hot R&B/Hip-Hop Songs (Billboard)	9

== Certifications ==
Certifications for "Love All"
Region	Certification	Certified units/sales
Australia (ARIA)	Gold	35,000^{‡}
New Zealand (RMNZ)	Gold	15,000^{‡}
United Kingdom (BPI)	Silver	200,000^{‡}
United States (RIAA)	Platinum	1,000,000^{‡}
^{‡} Sales+streaming figures based on certification alone.
