= Quicksand (Morray song) =

2020 single by Morray

Single by Morray

from the album Street Sermons
- Released: October 30, 2020
- Length: 3:43
- Label: Pick Six; Interscope
- Songwriters: Morae Ruffin; Hagan Lange; Anthony Phillips
- Producers: Hagan; Ant Chamberlain

Morray singles chronology
"Quicksand" (2020)	"Switched Up" (2020)

Music video
- "Quicksand" on YouTube

"Quicksand" is the debut single by American rapper Morray. The song's music video premiered in March 2020, before it was released again on October 30, 2020, by Pick Six Records and Interscope Records. It is the lead single from Morray's debut mixtape Street Sermons (2021). The song debuted at number 100 on the Billboard Hot 100 in February 2021, and peaked at number 65.

== Background ==
Morray composed the track in January 2020. He has described "Quicksand" as a track that truly reflects who he is, different from his older songs, and said that he wrote it after his wife encouraged him to write songs that are really about himself. A music video for the song was uploaded onto Morray's YouTube channel in March 2020. The song became his breakout hit, leading to him being discovered by media manager Moe Shalizi and receiving co-signs from many artists such as J. Cole, Rick Ross and DaBaby.

== Composition ==
In the song, Morray sings over a guitar-driven beat about surviving his early life, including the streets, poverty and feuding: "Since a jit, stood tall with a kickstand / Thinking of a plan to get quick bands / Falling in deep with the quicksand / Flag out my ass, no quick brand".

== Critical reception ==
Dylan Green of Pitchfork wrote that the song "pairs Morray's rapid-fire delivery with tales about his time in the streets, full of close-call shootings and desperation, and elevates the narrative with trills that breach the surface of Hagan and Ant Chamberl[a]in's warm production like a shark's fin."

== Charts ==
=== Weekly charts ===
Weekly chart performance for "Quicksand"
Chart (2021)	Peak position
US Billboard Hot 100	65
US Hot R&B/Hip-Hop Songs (Billboard)	25
US Rhythmic (Billboard)	12

=== Year-end charts ===
Year-end chart performance for "Quicksand"
Chart (2021)	Position
US Hot R&B/Hip-Hop Songs (Billboard)	52

== Certifications ==
Region	Certification	Certified units/sales
United States (RIAA)	Gold	500,000^{‡}
^{‡} Sales+streaming figures based on certification alone.
