= Middle Child =

2019 single by J. Cole

Single by J. Cole

from the album Revenge of the Dreamers III
- Released: January 23, 2019
- Recorded: December 2018
- Studio: The Sheltuh, Raleigh, North Carolina
- Genre: Hip hop; trap
- Length: 3:33
- Label: Dreamville; Roc Nation; Interscope
- Songwriters: Jermaine Cole; Allan Felder; Norman Harris; Tyler Williams
- Producers: T-Minus; Cole

J. Cole singles chronology
"A Lot" (2019)	"Middle Child" (2019)	"Shea Butter Baby" (2019)

Music video
- "Middle Child" on YouTube

"Middle Child" (stylized in all caps) in is a song by American rapper J. Cole. The song was released on January 23, 2019, through Dreamville Records, Roc Nation and Interscope Records, as the first single from Dreamville's 2019 compilation album, Revenge of the Dreamers III. The song was written by J. Cole, T-Minus, Allan Felder, & Norman Harris, and produced by the former two. It was serviced to rhythmic and urban contemporary radio on February 5, 2019. The track contains a sample from "Wake Up to Me", written by Felder and Harris, as performed by First Choice. On the song, J. Cole explores "his place between the old and new generations of hip hop, making him the 'middle child' of rap."

== Background and release ==
On January 20, 2019, J. Cole cleared his Instagram page, the next day Cole cryptically posted a series of posts with lines from the song. They read: I'm Counting My Bullets, I'm Loading My Clips, I'm Writing Down Names, I'm Making A List, J Cole later deleted the posts. Then, later that same day, Cole announced on social media that he was releasing "Middle Child" on January 23, 2019, at 9:00 PM EST, and uploaded the cover art which featured the song's title capitalized over a static grey background.

On January 25, 2019, in an interview with Complex, producer T-Minus revealed that they made the song about two months before the highly promoted Dreamville recording sessions, which were held the same month "Middle Child" was released. He also spoke about the process he and Cole took making the song:

No. Well, the way we work is we kind of just start from scratch, and we just brainstorm from there. Him and his manager had an idea to pull a sample out, so we went online and we found this really cool loop. The moment we heard it, we all reacted to it. Cole fell in love with it, and I could tell he had the vision for what he wanted. So he heard the sample and we were like, "Yo, we gotta do something on this." So we started filling the track out. It all happened in one day. We filled this beat out, he started writing to it, he recorded it—it was pretty much done within that day. The whole record. It was just a moment and it was actually one of the last days of sessions that we did. We did like a five day run of just working, and it was the last day, so it came right in the nick of time.

== Production ==
"Middle Child" was produced by both J. Cole and Canadian hip-hop producer T-Minus. The song includes an exclusive multi-track sample of the horns section from "Wake Up to Me" by '70s Philadelphia trio First Choice, which was found and cleared through music licensing site Tracklib. This allowed them to isolate horns before adding in the drums. In an episode of Genius' Deconstructed, T-Minus explained he "put some reverb on [the horn sample] to give it that effect of it being a little bit more airy, a little bit bigger". Next was the addition of drums to the song, which T-Minus said was reminiscent of KOD "'cause a lot of it's very like stuttery kind of hats, very short but rhythmic". The drums added a variety of sounds, but J. Cole wanted to add an 808 pattern to the song, with the beat going from high to low. T-Minus noted the 808 for being "really hard" and also incorporated hi-hats to add "more energy to the song when it drops". The last production detail was including T-Minus' signature "trippy vibe", which he previously utilized on song like Kendrick Lamar's "Swimming Pools (Drank)" and Lil Wayne's "She Will"—"at the end of the record, we kind of added this effect to make everything kind of sound dark and kind of trippy".

== Commercial performance ==
With only one day of tracking, the song debuted at number 26 on the US Billboard Hot 100. The following week, the song peaked at number 4, later becoming J. Cole's best performing track and highest-charting song until the release of My Life with 21 Savage & Morray, which peaked at number two. The song also peaked at number 2 on the US Hot R&B/Hip-Hop Songs chart.

== Music video ==
An accompanying music video for the track was uploaded to Cole's official YouTube channel on February 25, 2019. Cole announced the video via Twitter on February 22, 2019. The video was shot in Georgia, and was directed by fellow North Carolina rapper Mez, and features cameos from Dreamville artists Lute, Omen, and Cozz. The video serves as Mez' first directed video.

In an interview with Complex, Mez spoke about the creation of the video, he said:

I came up with everything from scratch, but [J. Cole's go-to director] Scott [Lazer] had an idea for the Bentley. He was like, "Man, we should get the Bentley dirty, we should ride it through the mud," you know what I mean? And we ended up having a conversation about how to expand on that idea. It's funny because we're all from North Carolina, so mudding cars is something we all know and understand. But when they said that, I then came up with the whole concept for the video. I was like, "Oh, I know what I want it to be." The whole video is a concept. It's like a flip of Middle America: the NASCAR shit, the mudding shit, the hunting shit, everything. Almost every single shot—even in the grocery store setting, with the white woman purchasing the black girl's features, you know what I'm saying?

Reviewing the music video, Laura Dzubay of The Michigan Daily said, "The visuals used in the "MIDDLE CHILD" video are very evocative: Between the lit-up marching band, the covered dead bodies, the stuffed rappers' heads on the mantle and the woman at the end picking a Saran-wrapped head out of a sale freezer at the grocery store, it's almost hard to land on which theme (if any) might be the most significant. What does seem clear is that J. Cole is asserting his readiness to dominate the music scene no matter which direction it takes next." Writing for The Fader, Jordan Darville described the video as "a fun, symbolic, and provocative set of visuals."

== Live performances ==
J. Cole performed "Middle Child" at the 2019 NBA All-Star Game halftime show on February 17, 2019, in Charlotte, North Carolina.

== Remixes ==
Many remixes have been made, including by rappers Deante' Hitchcock, released on January 28, 2019, Reason, released on March 8, 2019, and Montana of 300, released on March 24, 2019.

== Awards and nominations ==
Year	Organization	Award	Result	Ref.
2019	BET Awards	Coca-Cola Viewer's Choice Award	Nominated	
2019	BET Hip Hop Awards	Impact Track	Won	
2019	Soul Train Music Awards	Rhythm & Bars Award	Nominated	
2020	Grammy Awards	Best Rap Performance	Nominated	

== Charts ==
=== Weekly charts ===
Chart (2019)	Peak position
Australia (ARIA)	15
Austria (Ö3 Austria Top 40)	40
Belgium (Ultratip Bubbling Under Flanders)	3
Belgium (Ultratip Bubbling Under Wallonia)	19
Canada Hot 100 (Billboard)	4
Czech Republic Singles Digital (ČNS IFPI)	40
Denmark (Tracklisten)	29
France (SNEP)	192
Germany (GfK)	70
Greece (IFPI)	4
Hungary (Stream Top 40)	22
Ireland (IRMA)	3
Latvia (LAIPA)	4
Lithuania (AGATA)	4
Netherlands (Single Top 100)	47
New Zealand (Recorded Music NZ)	6
Norway (VG-lista)	16
Portugal (AFP)	9
Slovakia Singles Digital (ČNS IFPI)	22
Sweden (Sverigetopplistan)	15
Switzerland (Schweizer Hitparade)	28
UK Singles (Official Charts)	9
US Billboard Hot 100	4
US Hot R&B/Hip-Hop Songs (Billboard)	2
US Rhythmic Airplay (Billboard)	1
US Rolling Stone Top 100	21

=== Year-end charts ===
Chart (2019)	Position
Australia (ARIA)	63
Canada (Canadian Hot 100)	36
Latvia (LAIPA)	43
New Zealand (Recorded Music NZ)	30
Portugal (AFP)	83
US Billboard Hot 100	25
US Hot R&B/Hip-Hop Songs (Billboard)	8
US Rhythmic (Billboard)	17
US Rolling Stone Top 100	7

== Certifications ==
Region	Certification	Certified units/sales
Australia (ARIA)	5× Platinum	350,000^{‡}
Brazil (Pro-Música Brasil)	2× Platinum	80,000^{‡}
Denmark (IFPI Danmark)	Platinum	90,000^{‡}
Italy (FIMI)	Gold	50,000^{‡}
New Zealand (RMNZ)	5× Platinum	150,000^{‡}
Poland (ZPAV)	Gold	25,000^{‡}
Portugal (AFP)	Gold	5,000^{‡}
Spain (Promusicae)	Gold	30,000^{‡}
United Kingdom (BPI)	Platinum	600,000^{‡}
United States (RIAA)	Diamond	10,000,000^{‡}
^{‡} Sales+streaming figures based on certification alone.

== Release history ==
Region	Date	Format	Label	Ref.
Various	January 23, 2019	Digital download; streaming	Dreamville; Roc Nation; Interscope	
