= A Lot =

Single by rapper 21 Savage

Single by 21 Savage featuring J. Cole

from the album I Am > I Was
- Released: January 8, 2019
- Genre: Hip-hop
- Length: 4:49
- Label: Slaughter Gang; Red; Epic
- Songwriters: Shayaa Joseph; Jermaine Cole; Dacoury Natche; Anthony White; Shelia Young
- Producers: DJ Dahi; J. White Did It

21 Savage singles chronology
"Cocky" (2018)	"A Lot" (2019)	"Enzo" (2019)

J. Cole singles chronology
"Off Deez" (2018)	"A Lot" (2019)	"Middle Child" (2019)

Music video
- "A Lot" on YouTube

"A Lot" is a song by British-American rapper 21 Savage. The audio of the song was released on December 20, 2018, a day ahead of the album's official release, via the rapper's YouTube account. The song was sent to rhythmic and urban contemporary radio on January 8, 2019, as the lead single from his second album I Am > I Was.

"A Lot" features fellow American rapper J. Cole, though he only appears in the streaming and digital versions, as well as later CD pressings. The song was written by the artists and its producers DJ Dahi and J. White Did It. It samples "I Love You" by East of Underground, which is a cover of "I Love You for All Seasons" performed by the Fuzz; Fuzz member Shelia Young is credited as a co-writer. The song received acclaim from critics, with Billboard ranking it as the 6th best song of 2019. It won a Grammy Award for Best Rap Song at the 2020 ceremony, marking both 21 Savage and J. Cole's first Grammy wins.

== Background ==
Speaking to The Breakfast Club radio show, 21 Savage recalled how the song came about after he and J. Cole first met at the Made in America Festival in 2018; the two exchanged cellphone numbers and a random text from Cole ended up in a studio session.

21 further elaborated:

He took the song with him back home to Raleigh, 'cause he drove [...] and then he sent me the shit. And I was like, "Damn, this shit hard as fuck". That was just like some spur-of-the-moment shit. You know I had to go up there and fuck with Cole."

== Composition and lyrics ==
On the song, 21 Savage reflects "just how much he's endured and how far he's come". J. Cole meanwhile "speaks directly on the dubious machinations of the music industry, the justice system, media spin and his own place in the larger narrative", according to Billboard. The magazine praised the "heady, honest lyricism that gives the song its timeless appeal". The song's video and the original CD edition feature an additional verse by 21, which included the line "Been through some things, but I couldn't imagine my kids stuck at the border", a reference to the Trump administration family separation policy. The hook contains similarities to Gucci Mane's 2009 song of the same name.

== Music video ==
The music video was released on February 1, 2019, and was directed by filmmaker Aisultan Seitov. It depicts 21 Savage having a family reunion in a luxurious mansion, with alternate shots intercut of his family members in dire situations such as being pulled over by police, in the hospital, refining cocaine, in jail, held hostage by organized crime, being sexually trafficked, or mourning the death of a son. The video was influenced by the films Cold War and The Godfather Part II.

Both J. Cole's verse and 21 Savage's alternate verse from the album version are featured, with J. Cole also appearing in the video.

== Alleged correlation to ICE detention ==
After the arrest and detention of 21 Savage by ICE just days after the release of the music video for "A Lot", it was purported that besides his immigration status, the rapper was targeted due to his alternate verse for the album version of the song. Lawyers for 21 Savage, in addition to U.S. Representative Alexandria Ocasio-Cortez, all suspect that ICE targeted him for his views and comments including the stanza of the song that criticized issues with the Mexico–U.S. border, especially the Trump administration family separation policy:

Been through some things but I couldn't imagine my kids stuck at the border

Flint still need water

Niggas was innocent, couldn't get lawyers.

== Charts ==
=== Weekly charts ===
Chart (2019)	Peak position
Australia (ARIA)	61
Belgium (Ultratip Bubbling Under Flanders)	15
Belgium (Ultratip Bubbling Under Wallonia)	16
Canada Hot 100 (Billboard)	21
Czech Republic Singles Digital (ČNS IFPI)	50
Hungary (Stream Top 40)	37
Ireland (IRMA)	25
Latvia (LAIPA)	5
Lithuania (AGATA)	8
New Zealand (Recorded Music NZ)	26
Portugal (AFP)	38
Slovakia Singles Digital (ČNS IFPI)	41
Sweden (Sverigetopplistan)	86
Switzerland (Schweizer Hitparade)	79
UK Singles (Official Charts)	29
US Billboard Hot 100	12
US Hot R&B/Hip-Hop Songs (Billboard)	5
US Hot Rap Songs (Billboard)	5
US Rhythmic Airplay (Billboard)	1
US Rolling Stone Top 100	99

=== Year-end charts ===
Chart (2019)	Position
Canada (Canadian Hot 100)	84
Portugal (AFP)	196
US Billboard Hot 100	42
US Hot R&B/Hip-Hop Songs (Billboard)	19
US Rhythmic (Billboard)	19
US Rolling Stone Top 100	32

== Certifications ==
Region	Certification	Certified units/sales
Australia (ARIA)	Gold	35,000^{‡}
Brazil (Pro-Música Brasil)	3× Platinum	120,000^{‡}
Canada (Music Canada)	6× Platinum	480,000^{‡}
Denmark (IFPI Danmark)	Gold	45,000^{‡}
France (SNEP)	Gold	100,000^{‡}
Italy (FIMI)	Gold	50,000^{‡}
Mexico (AMPROFON)	2× Platinum+Gold	150,000^{‡}
New Zealand (RMNZ)	4× Platinum	120,000^{‡}
Poland (ZPAV)	Platinum	50,000^{‡}
Portugal (AFP)	Platinum	10,000^{‡}
United Kingdom (BPI)	Platinum	600,000^{‡}
United States (RIAA)	5× Platinum	5,000,000^{‡}
^{‡} Sales+streaming figures based on certification alone.

== Awards ==
Ceremony	Category	Result	Ref.
2020 Grammy Awards	Best Rap Song	Won	
