= What's Next (Drake song) =

2021 song by Drake

Single by Drake

from the EP Scary Hours 2
- Released: March 5, 2021
- Genre: Trap
- Length: 2:58
- Label: Republic; OVO
- Songwriters: Aubrey Graham; Jonathan Priester; Maneesh Bidaye
- Producers: Maneesh; Supah Mario

Drake singles chronology
"Talk to Me" (2021)	"What's Next" (2021)	"Over the Top" (2021)

Music video
- "What’s Next" on YouTube

"What's Next" is a song by Canadian rapper Drake. It was released on March 5, 2021, as a single from Drake's fourth EP Scary Hours 2, through Republic Records and OVO Sound.

With the song's debut at the top of the US Billboard Hot 100, it became Drake's eighth US number-one single in the country. Additionally, it became his fourth song to debut atop the chart.

== Background ==
An earlier version of the song surfaced on the internet on February 27, 2021. It was noted that various lines of the song resembled those of on an unreleased track with Young Thug titled "What a Time to Be a Slime". On March 3, 2021, Drake took to his social media to announce the release of his upcoming EP Scary Hours 2 on March 5, as well as the return of OVO Sound Radio the next day. The song was released as track one of the EP.

In May 2021, rapper Baby Keem revealed he was originally intended to be featured on the single alongside American rapper Playboi Carti (who Drake would later work with on the track Pain 1993). In the early morning of September 4, 2021, a day after the release of Drake's Certified Lover Boy, Drake premiered the original version of What's Next with Baby Keem on his radio show. The original version includes all vocals from the released version, with an additional verse from Keem.

== Composition ==
The song was described as Drake being "on his rapping shit" and "in flex mode", with a "grungy trap production" and a "triumphant-sounding instrumental". Lyrically, the rapper shows off "grandiose flexes that only he could relate to".

== Music video ==
An accompanying music video was released alongside the single and was directed by Theo Skudra. The video was shot in early March 2021 in Toronto and shows Drake dancing at different sites of the city, including the top of the CN Tower, as well as the TTC Subway, Yonge-Dundas Square (now Sankofa Square), and Ripley's Aquarium of Canada.

== Commercial performance ==
The song debuted atop the US Billboard Hot 100 on the chart dated March 20, 2021, dethroning Olivia Rodrigo's "Drivers License" which ruled for eight consecutive weeks. The remaining tracks from the Scary Hours 2 EP, "Wants and Needs" and "Lemon Pepper Freestyle", managed to debut at number two and three, respectively, thus making him the first artist in history to have three songs debut in the top 3 of the Billboard Hot 100.

== Personnel ==
Credits adapted from Tidal.

- Aubrey Graham – lead vocals, songwriting
- Jonathan Priester – songwriting, production
- Maneesh Bidaye – songwriting, production, additional production
- Noah Shebib – mixing, studio personnel
- Noel Cadastre – recording, studio personnel

== Charts ==
=== Weekly charts ===
Weekly chart performance for "What's Next"
Chart (2021)	Peak position
Australia (ARIA)	7
Austria (Ö3 Austria Top 40)	32
Belgium (Ultratip Bubbling Under Flanders)	2
Canada Hot 100 (Billboard)	1
Czech Republic Singles Digital (ČNS IFPI)	72
Denmark (Tracklisten)	34
France (SNEP)	74
Germany (GfK)	36
Global 200 (Billboard)	1
Iceland (Tónlistinn)	25
Ireland (IRMA)	7
Italy (FIMI)	88
Lithuania (AGATA)	12
Netherlands (Single Top 100)	43
New Zealand (Recorded Music NZ)	12
Norway (VG-lista)	27
Portugal (AFP)	18
Slovakia (Singles Digitál Top 100)	26
Sweden (Sverigetopplistan)	47
Switzerland (Schweizer Hitparade)	14
UK Singles (Official Charts)	4
UK Hip Hop/R&B (Official Charts)	1
US Billboard Hot 100	1
US Hot R&B/Hip-Hop Songs (Billboard)	1
US Pop Airplay (Billboard)	40
US Rhythmic Airplay (Billboard)	1

=== Year-end charts ===
Year-end chart performance for "What's Next"
Chart (2021)	Position
Canada (Canadian Hot 100)	68
Global 200 (Billboard)	179
US Billboard Hot 100	68
US Hot R&B/Hip-Hop Songs (Billboard)	29
US Rhythmic (Billboard)	32

== Certifications ==
Certifications for "What's Next"
Region	Certification	Certified units/sales
Australia (ARIA)	Platinum	70,000^{‡}
Canada (Music Canada)	Platinum	80,000^{‡}
United Kingdom (BPI)	Silver	200,000^{‡}
^{‡} Sales+streaming figures based on certification alone.

== Release history ==
List of release dates and formats for "What's Next"
Country	Date	Format	Label(s)	Ref.
United States	March 9, 2021	Rhythmic contemporary radio	OVO; Republic	

== See also ==
- List of Billboard Hot 100 number ones of 2021
