= Pride Is the Devil =

2021 song by J. Cole and Lil Baby

Song by J. Cole and Lil Baby

from the album The Off-Season
- Length: 3:38
- Label: Dreamville; Roc Nation; Interscope
- Songwriters: Jermaine Cole; Dominique Jones
- Producer: T-Minus

Audio video
- "Pride Is the Devil" on YouTube

"Pride Is the Devil" (stylized as "p r i d e . i s . t h e . d e v i l") is a song written and performed by American rappers J. Cole and Lil Baby. Produced by T-Minus, it was released on May 14, 2021, as part of the former's sixth studio album, The Off-Season.

== Production and composition ==
The song is produced by T-Minus and samples Aminé's "Can’t Decide" from his 2020 album Limbo, also produced by T-Minus. It is the first collaboration between Cole and Lil Baby, after the two appeared together in 2019 for Dreamville's recording sessions for the compilation album Revenge of the Dreamers III.

== Critical reception ==
Variety's Brandon Yu said Lil Baby's feature was a standout appearance on the song. Carl Lammare of Billboard also mentioned Lil Baby's feature on Drake's "Wants and Needs" and Cole's "Pride Is the Devil" in 2021 saying he "floated on both tracks, most notably the latter, where he solidified his standing as one of rap's premier stars."

== Commercial performance ==
Upon its first week of release, "Pride Is the Devil" debuted at number 7 on the US Billboard Hot 100 along with three other tracks from the album, making Cole the third artist to debut four songs in the top ten.

== Awards and nominations ==
| Year | Organization | Award | Result | Ref. |
|---|---|---|---|---|
| 2022 | Grammy Awards | Best Melodic Rap Performance | Nominated | |

== Charts ==
=== Weekly charts ===
Weekly chart performance for "Pride Is the Devil"
| Chart (2021) | Peak position |
|---|---|
| Australia (ARIA) | 15 |
| Canada Hot 100 (Billboard) | 10 |
| Lithuania (AGATA) | 45 |
| New Zealand (Recorded Music NZ) | 8 |
| Sweden (Sverigetopplistan) | 59 |
| UK Singles (OCC) | 15 |
| US Billboard Hot 100 | 7 |
| US Hot R&B/Hip-Hop Songs (Billboard) | 5 |

=== Year-end charts ===
Year-end chart performance for "Pride Is the Devil"
| Chart (2021) | Position |
|---|---|
| US Hot R&B/Hip-Hop Songs (Billboard) | 76 |

== Certifications ==
Certifications for "Pride Is the Devil"
| Region | Certification | Certified units/sales |
|---|---|---|
| Australia (ARIA) | Platinum | 70,000^{‡} |
| Denmark (IFPI Danmark) | Gold | 45,000^{‡} |
| United Kingdom (BPI) | Silver | 200,000^{‡} |
| United States (RIAA) | 2× Platinum | 2,000,000^{‡} |
^{‡} Sales+streaming figures based on certification alone.
