= Morray =

American rapper

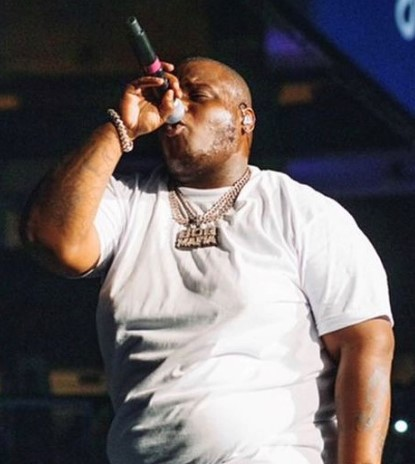
- Morray performing at J. Cole's The Off-Season Tour in 2021

Background information
- Born: Morae Ebony Ruffin; November 10, 1993 (age 32); New York City, New York, U.S.
- Origin: Fayetteville, North Carolina, U.S.
- Genres: Southern hip hop; trap; R&B
- Occupations: Producer; singer; Director; songwriter
- Years active: 2014–present
- Labels: Dreamchasers Records; Pick Six; Interscope

Morae Ebony Ruffin (born November 10,1993), known professionally as Morray, is an American singer and producer. He first saw recognition for his 2020 single "Quicksand", which led him to sign with Interscope Records and release his debut mixtape, Street Sermons (2021) the following year. The song peaked at number 65 on the Billboard Hot 100, while his 2021 single "My Life" (with J. Cole and 21 Savage) peaked at number two on the chart and received platinum certification by the Recording Industry Association of America (RIAA).

== Early life ==
Growing up in Fayetteville, North Carolina, Ruffin was raised on R&B and gospel music, singing in his local church by the age of four. He moved to Lebanon, Pennsylvania at age 12 and lived there for six years before moving back to North Carolina. While in Pennsylvania, he met a rap collective called SGS which inspired him to start making music. With stints in juvenile detention at age 19, he served jail time in his early 20s.

While raising a child, he worked construction and recorded music on the side. In 2014, he released his first song, which he recorded for his wife's birthday, and started taking music seriously. In 2020, he lost his job at a call center and chose to pursue his music career to support his three children.

== Career ==
In March 2020, Morray released his first music video "Quicksand", which led to his being discovered by media manager Moe Shalizi. He became Morray's manager and launched a record label called Pick Six Records. Morray also featured two more songs with Mo Chedda in 2020, "Snitch On Ya Man's" and "In Da Trap". On October 30, Morray and Shalizi re-released "Quicksand" as a single; it later charted on the Billboard Hot 100. Following the single, he received co-signs from fellow North Carolina rappers J. Cole and DaBaby. The single amassed millions of streams, and he was featured as part of Billboard's Emerging Artists Spotlight. In an interview with Billboard, he said "I want to be that light in the ghetto, I want be the person that makes you smile and shows you the hood ain't all bad. I appreciate where I came from and I know that the ghetto can bring both positive and negative memories." He released three more singles in 2020: "Switched Up", "Low Key", and "Dreamland".

In 2021, Morray released the singles "Big Decisions" and "Kingdom". On April 16, Morray announced that he had signed to Interscope Records in a joint venture with Pick Six. He released the single "Trenches" ahead of his debut project in April. His mixtape Street Sermons was released on April 28, 2021. The mixtape debuted on the US Billboard 200 at number 41. On May 14, Morray was a guest feature on J. Cole's album The Off-Season, on the song "My Life" with 21 Savage. The song debuted at number two on the Hot 100, becoming his highest charting and best performing song. Also in 2021, he was featured on the 2021 XXL Freshman Class. On June 22, it was announced he would be joining J. Cole and 21 Savage on their co-headlining The Off-Season Tour as their opener. On July 30, Morray released a remix of his song "Trenches" featuring Polo G.

== Artistry ==
Morray grew up listening to artists like Usher and took inspiration from Drake's rapping and singing fluidity. His style has been compared to CeeLo Green, and described as combining "the soulfulness of Big K.R.I.T. with the bounce of Outkast".

== Discography ==
=== Studio albums ===
List of studio albums
Title	Details
Long Story Short	Released: February 21, 2025; Label: Empire; Format: Digital download, streaming

=== Mixtapes ===
List of mixtapes, with selected chart positions
Title	Details	Peak chart positions		
Title	Details	US	US R&B /HH	US Rap
Street Sermons	Released: April 28, 2021; Label: Pick Six, Interscope; Format: Digital download, streaming	41	20	17

=== Singles ===
==== As lead artist ====
List of singles, with selected chart positions
Title	Year	Peak chart positions			Certifications	Album
Title	Year	US	US R&B /HH	US Rap	Certifications	Album
"Quicksand"	2020	65	29	23	RIAA: Gold	Street Sermons
"Switched Up"	2020	—	—	—		Street Sermons
"Low Key"	2020	—	—	—		Non-album singles
"Dreamland"	2020	—	—	—		Non-album singles
"Big Decisions"	2021	—	—	—		Street Sermons
"Kingdom"	2021	—	—	—		Street Sermons
"Trenches" (solo or with Polo G)	2021	—	—	—		Street Sermons
"Bad Situations"	2021	—	—	—		Non-album singles
"Mime"	2021	—	—	—		Madden NFL 22
"Never Fail" (with Benny the Butcher)	2021	—	—	—		Non-album singles
"Still Here" (with Cordae)	2022	—	—	—		Non-album singles
"Momma's Love"	2022	—	—	—		Non-album singles
"Ticket"	2022	—	—	—		Non-album singles

==== As featured artist ====
List of featured singles, with selected chart positions
Title	Year	Peak chart positions										Certifications	Album
Title	Year	US	US R&B /HH	US Rap	AUS	CAN	IRE	NZ	SWI	UK	WW	Certifications	Album
"My Life" (J. Cole with 21 Savage and Morray)	2021	2	1	1	11	8	12	5	34	13	4	RIAA: Platinum; ARIA: 3× Platinum; BPI: Silver	The Off-Season
"In My Blood" (MO3 featuring Morray)	2021	—	—	—	—	—	—	—	—	—	—		Shottaz 4Eva

=== Guest appearances ===
List of non-single guest appearances, with other performing artists, showing year released and album name
Title	Year	Other artist(s)	Album
"Snitch on Ya Man's"	2020	Mo Chedda, AR	Non-album songs
"In Da Trap"	2020	Mo Chedda	Non-album songs
"Mime"	2021	—N/a	Madden NFL 22
"Hands Up"	2021	Tyla Yaweh	Non-album songs
"All Them Days"	2021	Derez De'Shon	Non-album songs
"Tail Lights"	2023	Macklemore	Ben

== Tours ==
Supporting

- The Off-Season Tour (with J. Cole) (2021)
