= 2021 in American music =

The following is a list of events and releases that happened in 2021 in music in the United States.

== Notable events ==
=== January ===
- 8 – Olivia Rodrigo releases her debut single, "Drivers License", which was met with critical acclaim and goes on to break several records.
- 29 – Lia Ices releases her first album in four years, Family Album.

=== February ===
- 5 – Foo Fighters release their first album in nearly four years, Medicine at Midnight.
- 7 – Eric Church and Jazmine Sullivan performs the national anthem, H.E.R. performs "America The Beautiful", and The Weeknd performs the halftime show during Super Bowl LV at Raymond James Stadium in Tampa, Florida.
- 12
  - Jillette Johnson releases her first album in four years, It's A Beautiful Day And I Love You.
  - Robin Thicke releases his first album in seven years, On Earth, and in Heaven.
  - In response to her dispute with her former record label, Big Machine Records, over the ownership of master recordings to her earlier discography, Taylor Swift releases "Love Story (Taylor's Version)", a re-recording of her 2008 song, and the first in a series of re-recordings of both her older songs and albums.
- 26 – Julien Baker releases her first album in four years, Little Oblivions.
  - NOFX release their first album in five years, Single Album.

=== March ===
- 5 – Tigers Jaw release their first album in four years, I Won't Care How You Remember Me.
  - A Day to Remember release their first album in nearly five years, You're Welcome. It was also the final album featuring founding bassist Josh Woodard before he departed from the band in October 2021.
  - Chevelle release their first album in five years, Niratias. It was also their first album released as a duo following the departure of longtime bassist Dean Bernardini at the end of 2019.
  - Kings of Leon release their first album in nearly five years, When You See Yourself.
  - The Spill Canvas release their first album in nine years, Conduit.
- 12 – Rob Zombie releases his first album in five years, The Lunar Injection Kool Aid Eclipse Conspiracy.
  - Nick Jonas release his first solo album in nearly five years, Spaceman.
  - Eyehategod release their first album in seven years, A History of Nomadic Behavior.
- 14 – The 63rd Annual Grammy Awards took place at the Los Angeles Convention Center. The Awards were originally scheduled for January 31, at the Staples Center but were pushed back due to escalating COVID-19 cases and health concerns in Los Angeles County. Beyoncé won the most awards with four. Billie Eilish won her second consecutive Record of the Year award for "Everything I Wanted", while Taylor Swift won her third Album of the Year award for Folklore.
- 19 – KSHMR releases his debut album Harmonica Andromeda.
  - Justin Bieber releases his sixth album, Justice. It was Bieber's first album in over a year.
- 26 – Evanescence release their first album of all-original material in ten years, and first overall in four years, The Bitter Truth.
  - Tomahawk release their first album in eight years, Tonic Immobility.
  - The Juliana Theory release their first album in 16 years, A Dream Away.
  - Adrian Smith (Iron Maiden) and Richie Kotzen (The Winery Dogs) release their self titled debut album, Smith/Kotzen.

=== April ===
- 2 – Demi Lovato releases her first album in nearly four years, Dancing with the Devil... the Art of Starting Over.
- 9 – Taylor Swift releases Fearless (Taylor's Version), a re-recorded version of her 2008 album of the same name. Swift had announced her intention to re-record her first six studio albums after her master recordings were sold to Scooter Braun. The album became the first ever re-recorded album to top the US Billboard 200 chart.
  - Rapper DMX dies at the age of 50, one week after suffering a heart attack from a drug overdose.
- 16 – Cannibal Corpse release their first album in four years, Violence Unimagined.
  - Liquid Tension Experiment release their first album in 22 years, Liquid Tension Experiment 3.
  - The Offspring release their first album in nearly nine years, Let the Bad Times Roll. It is also their first album without original bassist Greg K., who was fired from the band in 2018, and their last album with drummer Pete Parada who was ejected from the band in August 2021.
- 18 – The 56th Academy of Country Music Awards takes place at various locations in Nashville.
- 23 – Porter Robinson releases his sophomore album, and also his first in seven years, Nurture.
  - Dinosaur Jr. release their first album in five years, Sweep It Into Space.
- 30 – Flotsam and Jetsam are scheduled to begin their Demolition of North America tour at the Club Red in Tempe, Arizona; this tour had previously been postponed from 2020 to this year, due to the COVID-19 pandemic, but was put on hold until further notice. A new album, Blood in the Water, previously expected to coincide with the tour, is released on June 4.
  - Manchester Orchestra release their first album in four years, The Million Masks of God.
  - Dropkick Murphys release their first album in four years, Turn Up That Dial.
  - Shelley, formerly DRAM, releases his first album in nearly five years, Shelley FKA DRAM.

=== May ===
- 7 – Miranda Lambert, Jack Ingram and Jon Randall release their collaborative album, The Marfa Tapes.
  - Travis Tritt releases his first album in fourteen years, Set in Stone.
- 14 – Alan Jackson releases his first album in six years, Where Have You Gone.
  - St. Vincent releases her first album in nearly four years, Daddy's Home.
- 21 – Blake Shelton releases his first album in nearly four years, Body Language.
  - Olivia Rodrigo's debut album, Sour, is released to critical acclaim and commercial success.
  - Counting Crows release their first new music in seven years, Butter Miracle, Suite One, a four-song EP that plays as a suite.
- 22 – Italy wins the Eurovision Song Contest 2021 with “Zitti e Buoni” by Mäneskin.
- 23 – The Billboard Music Awards take place in Los Angeles.
  - Chayce Beckham wins the nineteenth season of American Idol. Willie Spence is named runner-up.
- 24 – Megadeth parts ways with its co-founder, bassist David Ellefson, following accusations of sexual misconduct on his part. Ellefson denied the allegations as false and is currently pursuing charges and a defamation lawsuit against the accuser. The woman involved also made a statement denying the allegations.
- 25 – Cam Anthony wins the twentieth season of The Voice. Kenzie Wheeler was named runner-up. Jordan Matthew Young, Rachel Mac, and Victor Solomon finish third, fourth, and fifth place respectively.
- 28 – DMX's first album in nine years (and also his final album), Exodus, is released following his death in April.

=== June ===
- 4 – Rise Against release their first album in four years, Nowhere Generation.
  - – Atreyu release Baptize, their first album without co-frontman Alex Varkatzas (who left in 2020), and also with Brandon Saller moving away from the drums to focus only on vocals.
  - – Lloyd Banks releases his first album in 11 years, The Course of the Inevitable.
  - – Liz Phair releases her first album in 11 years, Soberish.
  - – Japanese Breakfast release their first album in four years, Jubilee.
- 9 – The CMT Music Awards take place in Nashville. Kane Brown and Kelsea Ballerini hosts.
- 11 – AFI release their first album in four years, Bodies.
  - – Azure Ray release their first album in 11 years, Remedy.
  - – Garbage release their first album in five years, No Gods No Masters.
  - – Maroon 5 release their first album in nearly four years, Jordi.
- 18 – Fear Factory release their first album in six years, Aggression Continuum. It is their first studio album released following former vocalist Burton C. Bell's departure from the previous year, though his vocals from the album's 2017 sessions are still present.
- 25
  - Gary Allan releases his first album in eight years, Ruthless.
  - Modest Mouse release their first album in six years, The Golden Casket.

=== July ===
- 9 – The Wallflowers release their first album in nine years, Exit Wounds.
- 16 – Caveman release their first album in five years, Smash.
  - – John Mayer releases his first album in four years, Sob Rock.
- 23
  - Descendents release their first album in five years, 9th & Walnut.
  - Dave Matthews Band embarked on their 2021 Summer Tour, playing the first show in Raleigh, NC.
- 24 – Green Day, Fall Out Boy, and Weezer kicked off the Hella Mega Tour, which had been postponed from 2020 due to the COVID-19 pandemic.
- 30 – Jack Antonoff's project Bleachers releases its first album in four years, Take the Sadness Out of Saturday Night.
  - – Isaiah Rashad releases his first album in five years, The House Is Burning.

=== August ===
- 6 – Willy Mason releases his first album in eight years, Already Dead.
  - Billy Currington releases his first album in six years, Intuition.
- 13 – Quicksand release their first album in four years, Distant Populations.
- 18 – Kiss resumed their End of the Road World Tour at Xfinity Center in Mansfield, Massachusetts, following 17 months of postponement due to the COVID-19 pandemic.
- 20 – Connie Smith releases her first album in ten years, The Cry of The Heart.
  - James McMurtry releases his first album in six years, The Horses and the Hounds.
- 27 – OneRepublic release their first album in nearly five years, Human.

=== September ===
- 3 – Molly Lewis releases her first album in six years, The Forgotten Edge.
- 10 – Sleigh Bells release their first album in five years, Texis.
- 12 – The 2021 MTV Video Music Awards took place at the Barclays Center in Brooklyn, New York.
- 17 – Candlebox release their first album in five years, Wolves.
- 17 – ZillaKami releases his debut album, DOG BOY.
- 24 – Angels & Airwaves release their first album in seven years, Lifeforms.

=== October ===
- 12 – Smash Mouth singer Steve Harwell announced his retirement from the band to focus on his health following an erratic performance at the Big Sip festival in Bethel, New York.
- 15 – Kelly Clarkson releases her second Christmas album, and also first in nearly four years, When Christmas Comes Around....
  - Gemini Syndrome release their first album in five years, 3rd Degree – The Raising.
- 19 – The 52nd GMA Dove Awards were held at the Allen Arena located in Nashville, Tennessee. Steven Furtick led the non-artist nominations with ten nominations, whilst Elevation Worship and Brandon Lake led the artist nominations with seven each.
- 22 – Fuel release their first album in seven years, Anomaly. It is their first and only album to feature lead singer John Corsale, following the second departure of original lead singer Brett Scallions. Co-founding member Carl Bell made his return on this album for the first time since 2007's Angels & Devils, and drummer Kevin Miller appeared for the first time since 2003's Natural Selection.
  - Every Time I Die release their first album in five years, Radical.
  - Together Pangea release their first album in eleven years, Dye.
- 29 – Mastodon release their first album in four years, Hushed and Grim.
  - The War on Drugs release their first album in four years, I Don't Live Here Anymore.
  - Tori Amos releases her first album in four years, Ocean to Ocean.
  - Jerry Cantrell releases his first solo album in 19 years, Brighten.
- 31 – Limp Bizkit release their first album in ten years, Still Sucks.

=== November ===
- 10 – The Country Music Association Awards took place at the Bridgestone Arena in Nashville; Luke Bryan hosts.
- 12 – Taylor Swift releases her second re-recorded album, Red (Taylor's Version), a freshly recorded issue of her 2012 studio album, Red.
  - Silk Sonic, consisting of Bruno Mars and Anderson .Paak, release their debut album, An Evening with Silk Sonic. It was Mars' first album in five years.
  - Walk the Moon release their first album in four years, Heights. It was their first album recorded as a trio after the band parted ways with bassist Kevin Ray in 2020.
- 19 – Exodus release their first studio album in seven years, Persona Non Grata.
  - Converge and Chelsea Wolfe release their collaborative album, Bloodmoon: I. It was Converge's first album in four years.
- 21 – The American Music Awards take place at the Microsoft Theatre in Los Angeles. BTS, Doja Cat and Megan Thee Stallion take home the most awards with three each.
- 26 – Marvin Peterson reissues his live album, In Concert.
  - Cynic release their first album in seven years, Ascension Codes. It was their first release since the 2020 deaths of bassist Sean Malone and former founding drummer Sean Reinert.

=== December ===
- 10 – Marie Osmond releases her first album in five years, Unexpected.
- 14 – Girl Named Tom wins the twenty-first season of The Voice. Wendy Moten was named runner-up. Paris Winningham, Hailey Mia, and Jershika Maple finished third, fourth, and fifth place respectively.
- 17 – John Dwyer releases his first album in fifteen years, Gong Splat
- 31 – Mourning Noise release their compilation album Mourning Noise

== Bands formed ==
- Dexter and the Moonrocks
- Silk Sonic

== Bands reformed ==
- 7 Seconds
- Big Time Rush
- The Bravery
- Crossbreed
- Element Eighty
- Mudvayne
- New Radicals
- Seven Mary Three
- Straylight Run
- The Summer Set
- The Walters

== Bands disbanded ==
- Beach Slang
- Jack Blanchard & Misty Morgan
- Fat Boys
- Hollywood Monsters
- Rascal Flatts
- Return to Forever

== Albums released in 2021 ==
=== January ===
Date	Album	Artist	Genre (s)
1	Distant	Bun B & Le$	Hip hop
1	J.T.	Steve Earle	Country; heartland rock
1	No Harm Done	Josephine Foster	Folk; Americana
1	Circuit Boredom	Ben Kweller	Indie rock
1	Your Parents Are Sellouts	That Handsome Devil	Alternative rock; rock
8	Greatest Hits	Corrin Campbell	Rock; alternative rock
8	Heaux Tales (EP)	Jazmine Sullivan	Hip hop; R&B
8	American Soul	Aaron Watson	Country
15	AAR at the Movies (EP)	The All-American Rejects	Alternative rock
15	Fillmore West 1-31-71	Allman Brothers Band	Southern rock; rock
15	Magic Mirror	Pearl Charles	Indie rock; folk rock
15	Catspaw	Matthew Sweet	Rock; indie pop
22	Sam Amidon	Sam Amidon	Folk
22	Melatonin Dreams	BoyWithUke	Alternative rock
22	Livin For Love	Bill Champlin	Pop; rock
22	Paranoia EP	Maggie Lindemann	Indie pop; pop
29	Dead Hand Control	Baio	Indie rock; indie pop
29	I've Seen All I Need To See	The Body	Doom metal; noise
29	Family Album	Lia Ices	Alternative rock; indie pop
29	OK Human	Weezer	Rock

=== February ===
Date	Album	Artist	Genre (s)
5	Medicine at Midnight	Foo Fighters	Alternative rock; hard rock; dance-rock
5	The Light Below	Walking Papers	Hard rock; blues
5	Flowers for Vases / Descansos	Hayley Williams	Folk
12	Life Rolls On	Florida Georgia Line	Country; country pop
12	I Only Want to Live Once	John the Ghost	Rock
12	It's A Beautiful Day And I Love You	Jillette Johnson	Indie pop; pop
12	Internet Killed the Rockstar	Mod Sun	Pop punk; pop rock
12	The Lucky Ones	Pentatonix	Pop; a cappella
12	Death by Rock and Roll	The Pretty Reckless	Hard rock; alternative rock
12	On Earth, and in Heaven	Robin Thicke	R&B
19	The Sophtware Slump	Grandaddy	Indie rock; space rock
19	Open Door Policy	The Hold Steady	Indie rock; post-punk revival
19	Trauma Factory	Nothing, Nowhere	Pop punk; emo rap
19	A Billion Little Lights	Wild Pink	Indie rock; heartland rock
26	Little Oblivious	Julien Baker	Indie folk; indie rock; alternative rock
26	Life Support	Madison Beer	Pop; R&B
26	The Shadow I Remember	Cloud Nothings	Indie rock; garage rock
26	Dark River	Lydia Luce	Classical; folk
26	Single Album	NOFX	Punk rock; skate punk

=== March ===
Date	Album	Artist	Genre (s)
5	Niratias	Chevelle	Alternative metal; hard rock
5	You're Welcome	A Day to Remember	Metalcore; pop punk
5	When You See Yourself	Kings of Leon	Alternative rock
5	Conduit	The Spill Canvas	Alternative rock; emo
5	I Won't Care How You Remember Me	Tigers Jaw	Rock; pop
12	-!-	Dead Poet Society	Rock; indie rock
12	A History of Nomadic Behavior	Eyehategod	Sludge metal
12	This is This	Grouplove	Indie pop; alternative rock
12	Spaceman	Nick Jonas	Pop
12	Topaz	Israel Nash	Rock; indie rock
12	The Lunar Injection Kool Aid Eclipse Conspiracy	Rob Zombie	Heavy metal; industrial metal
19	No Other Godz Before Me	Agent Steel	Hard rock; heavy metal
19	Greatest Hits Vol 2 (Reissue)	Papa Roach	Hard rock; heavy metal
26	El Dorado	24kGoldn	Alternative rock; pop rock; hip hop
26	OK Orchestra	AJR	Indie pop; alternative rock
26	The Bitter Truth	Evanescence	Alternative metal; gothic metal; hard rock; Christian rock
26	A Dream Away	The Juliana Theory	Alternative rock; emo
26	Tonic Immobility	Tomahawk	Alternative rock
26	sketchy.	Tune-Yards	Indie pop; art pop; indie rock
26	My Savior	Carrie Underwood	Gospel

=== April ===
Date	Album	Artist	Genre (s)
2	Gary Bartz JID 006	Gary Bartz	Jazz; funk
2	Midlife Priceless	Mark Bryan	Rock; pop
2	Head of Roses	Flock of Dimes	Indie pop; indie rock
2	Dancing with the Devil... the Art of Starting Over	Demi Lovato	Pop
2	Return of the Dragon	Sacred Oath	Hard rock; heavy metal
9	Greatest Hits Live	Ace Frehley	Hard rock; heavy metal
9	Trophies	Apollo Brown	Alternative hip hop; underground hip hop
9	Roadrunner: New Light, New Machine	Brockhampton	Hip hop; pop rap
9	Fearless (Taylor's Version) (Re-recording)	Taylor Swift	Country pop
16	Violence Unimagined	Cannibal Corpse	Death metal
16	Chemical Warfare	Escape the Fate	Post-hardcore; hard rock; metalcore
16	The Battle at Garden's Gate	Greta Van Fleet	Hard rock; blues rock
16	Let the Bad Times Roll	The Offspring	Punk rock
16	Liquid Tension Experiment 3	Liquid Tension Experiment	Progressive metal
16	High Dive	SHAED	Pop; indie pop
16	Max Maco is Dead Right?	Two Feet	Electronic; alternative rock
23	Into The Future (Reissue)	Bad Brains	Hard rock; rock
23	Heart & Soul	Eric Church	Country
23	Sweep It Into Space	Dinosaur Jr.	Alternative rock; indie rock
23	Nurture	Porter Robinson	Electronic; synth-pop
23	The Rise & Fall of Loverboy	Sir Sly	Indie pop; alternative rock
30	Love & Rage	Carsie Blanton	Folk; jazz
30	Turn Up That Dial	Dropkick Murphys	Celtic punk
30	The Million Masks of God	Manchester Orchestra	Indie rock; alternative rock
30	Shelley FKA DRAM	Shelley	R&B; hip hop
30	There Used To Be Horses Here	Amy Speace	Americana; folk

=== May ===
Date	Album	Artist	Genre (s)
7	Ashlyn	Ashe	Indie pop; alternative rock
7	When God Was Great	The Mighty Mighty Bosstones	Ska punk; punk rock
7	The Marfa Tapes	Miranda Lambert, Jack Ingram and Jon Randall	Country; Texas country
7	Better Mistakes	Bebe Rexha	pop; dance-pop
7	Set In Stone	Travis Tritt	Country
7	Van Weezer	Weezer	Alternative rock; rock; hard rock
7	Sincerely, Kentrell	Youngboy Never Broke Again	Hip hop
14	Delta Kream	The Black Keys	Rock; blues rock
14	Blood	Juliana Hatfield	Rock; pop
14	Where Have You Gone	Alan Jackson	Country
14	The Ides Of March	Myles Kennedy	Hard rock; heavy metal
14	Road To The Sun	Pat Metheny	Jazz; pop
14	Daddy's Home	St. Vincent	Indie pop; rock; indie rock
20	TV	Tai Verdes	Roots rock; pop rock
21	Butter Miracle, Suite One (EP)	Counting Crows	Alternative rock
21	Harmony House	Dayglow	Indie pop; indie rock; alternative rock
21	January Flower	Mat Kearney	Folk; soft rock
21	Long Lost	Lord Huron	Baroque pop; folk; outlaw country
21	Perfectly Preserved	Love and Death	Hard rock; heavy metal
21	Sour	Olivia Rodrigo	Pop; indie pop; pop-punk
21	Body Language.	Blake Shelton	Country
21	Scaled and Icy	Twenty One Pilots	Pop rock; alternative rock
21	Greatest Hits	Waterparks	Pop rock; alternative rock
28	You Hear Georgia	Blackberry Smoke	Hard rock; southern rock
28	Based on a True Story (EP)	Brynn Cartelli	Pop
28	Exodus	DMX	Hip hop
28	Doom Loop (Reissue)	Mansions	Indie rock; alternative rock
28	The Waylon Sessions	Shannon McNally	Rock; pop
28	Reprise	Moby	Electronica; techno
28	The Iceberg	Oddisee	Hip hop

=== June ===
Date	Album	Artist	Genre (s)
4	Baptize	Atreyu	Hard rock; heavy metal
4	The Course of the Inevitable	Lloyd Banks	Hip hop
4	Fever Dreams	BoyWithUke	Alternative rock
4	Book of My Blues	Mark Collie	Country
4	Blood in the Water	Flotsam and Jetsam	Thrash metal
4	Garbage Band Kids	Green Jellÿ	Comedy rock; heavy metal; punk rock; alternative metal
4	Soberish	Liz Phair	Alternative rock; indie rock
4	Nowhere Generation	Rise Against	Punk rock; melodic hardcore
4	Changephobia	Rostam	Electronic; indie pop; alternative rock
4	Welcome To Sparks Nevada	Sun Kil Moon	Folk rock; indie rock
11	Bodies	AFI	Alternative rock; gothic rock; new wave
11	Fistful of Metal (Reissue)	Anthrax	Hard rock; heavy metal
11	Remedy	Azure Ray	Dream pop; indie pop
11	No Gods No Masters	Garbage	Alternative rock
11	Jordi	Maroon 5	Pop
11	Troubled Paradise	Slayyyter	Dance-pop; pop
11	Path of Wellness	Sleater-Kinney	Punk rock; indie rock
18	The Summer House Sessions	Don Cherry	Big band; pop
18	Aggression Continuum	Fear Factory	Industrial metal; groove metal
18	Smoke and Mirrors	Steve Cole	Jazz; pop
18	Gentle Man	Rory Feek	Country; pop
25	Ruthless	Gary Allan	Country
25	Below	Beartooth	Hard rock; metal
25	Planet Her	Doja Cat	Pop; Hip hop; R&B
25	Grim Value (EP)	Eve 6	Pop punk; alternative rock
25	Boy for Michigan	John Grant	Folk; indie rock
25	Fake Ideas	Hurry	Indie pop; indie rock
25	Every Window is a Mirror (EP)	Joywave	Indie rock; alternative rock
25	What a Song Can Do (Chapter One)	Lady A	Country
25	Roundtable	Doyle Lawson & Quicksilver	Bluegrass; gospel
25	Cinema	The Marías	Indie pop; indie rock
25	The Golden Casket	Modest Mouse	Indie rock; alternative rock
25	Dark in Here	The Mountain Goats	Indie rock; folk rock
25	Death of a Cheerleader	Pom Pom Squad	Indie rock; indie pop
25	The Original Motion Picture Soundtrack	Saint Motel	Indie pop; alternative rock

=== July ===
Date	Album	Artist	Genre (s)
2	Tell Me About Tomorrow	Jxdn	Pop-punk; emo rap
2	Bushido	Mello Music Group	Hip hop; jazz
2	Freedom Over Everything	Vince Mendoza	Jazz; pop
2	Fist Full Of Devils	Earl Slick	Blues rock; hard rock
9	Mythopoetics	Half Waif	Synth-pop; electronic
9	Kings of Crunk	Lil Jon & The East Side Boyz	Hip hop
9	XOXO: From Love and Anxiety in Real Time	The Maine	Alternative rock; pop rock
9	Twin Shadow	Twin Shadow	New wave; pop rock
9	Exit Wounds	The Wallflowers	Alternative rock; rock
16	Smash	Caveman	Indie rock
16	Chicago at Carnegie Hall Complete	Chicago	Rock
16	Sling	Clairo	Pop; folk rock; indie pop
16	The Best of Dirty Heads	Dirty Heads	Alternative hip hop; alternative rock
16	Fallen Embers	Illenium	EDM; melodic dubstep; future bass
16	Sob Rock	John Mayer	Pop; soft rock
16	Inner Feelings	Roy Porter	Jazz; pop
16	Good Morning America	Lawrence Rothman	Alternative rock; art pop
16	Hideaway	Wavves	Garage rock; indie rock; pop-punk
16	Lately I Feel Everything	Willow	Pop-punk
17	Hail Satin	Dee Gees	Disco; rock
23	Perpetual Burn	Jason Becker	Heavy metal; rock
23	Downhill From Everywhere	Jackson Browne	Rock; pop music
23	9th & Walnut	Descendents	Punk rock; pop-punk
23	Watch Over Me	Lissie	Country; pop
23	The Ghost and the Wall	Joshua Radin	Acoustic; folk
30	Take the Sadness Out of Saturday Night	Bleachers	Indie pop; synth-pop; new wave
30	Traveler's Blues	Blues Traveler	Blues rock; folk rock
30	Happier Than Ever	Billie Eilish	Electropop; dark pop
30	ARETHA Box Set	Aretha Franklin	R&B; soul; pop
30	Rise from the Ashes Live at the Shrine	The Ghost Inside	Hard rock; metalcore
30	Welcome 2 America	Prince	R&B; soul
30	The House Is Burning	Isaiah Rashad	Hip hop

=== August ===
Date	Album	Artist	Genre (s)
3	Harmonizer	Ty Segall	Garage rock; psychedelic rock; indie rock
6	Mirror Mirror	Chick Corea	Jazz; jazz fusion
6	A Czar Is Born	Czarface	Hip hop; alternative hip hop
6	Fighting Words	Ellen Foley	Rock; pop
6	Already Dead	Willie Mason	Blues; country
6	Lavatorium	Sponge	Alternative rock
6	Never Too Late to Call	Paul Thorn	Country; blues; southern rock
13	One in a Million (25th Anniversary Re-issue)	Aaliyah	Urban pop; pop
13	Blacktop Mojo	Blacktop Mojo	Post-grunge; rock
13	Live from the Ryman & More	Sheryl Crow	Rock; pop
13	United States vs. Billie Holiday	Andra Day	Jazz; pop
13	Ekundayo Inversions	El Michels Affair	Soul; jazz
13	Pressure Machine	The Killers	Folk rock
13	Distant Populations	Quicksand	Post-hardcore; alternative metal
13	My Name Is Suzie Ungerleider	Suzie Ungerleider	Alternative country
13	Pillows & Therapy	Weathers	Alternative rock; indie rock
20	Colors II	Between the Buried and Me	Progressive metal; technical death metal
20	Infinite Granite	Deafheaven	Hard rock; post-metal
20	Maybe We Will Never Die	Anderson East	Roots rock; blues rock
20	The Body Remembers	Debbie Gibson	Pop; dance-pop
20	The Horses and the Hounds	James McMurtry	Alternative country; roots rock; Americana
20	Have a Seat	Maggie Rose	Country; pop
20	The Cry of The Heart	Connie Smith	Country; pop
27	Need	3OH!3	Pop; trap; hip hop; crunkcore
27	The Bronx VI	The Bronx	Punk rock; garage rock
27	Pure	Robben Ford	Blues; jazz; rock
27	Umbra	Grayscale	Pop punk; alternative rock
27	If I Can't Have Love, I Want Power	Halsey	Alternative rock; grunge-pop; industrial
27	Human	OneRepublic	Pop rock; pop
27	In a Roomful of Blood With a Sleeping Tiger	Bob Schneider	Rock; pop; country
27	Annette	Sparks	Art pop; synth-pop
27	Glow On	Turnstile	Hardcore punk; punk rock; alternative rock

=== September ===
Date	Album	Artist	Genre (s)
3	Mercury – Act 1	Imagine Dragons	Alternative rock; pop rock
3	The Forgotten Edge	Molly Lewis	Acoustic
3	Amputechture (Reissue)	The Mars Volta	Progressive rock
3	Last of the Better Days Ahead	Charlie Parr	Piedmont blues; blues rock
3	All the Brilliant Things	Skyzoo	Hip hop
10	God is Partying	Andrew W.K.	Hard rock; heavy metal
10	Live at Roadburn 2013 (live album)	Elder	Stoner rock; doom metal
10	No Way Out But Through	Face to Face	Punk rock; rock
10	The Rain Just Follows Me	Hawthorne Heights	Emo; pop-punk; post-hardcore
10	Star–Crossed	Kacey Musgraves	Country; country pop
10	Thank You	Diana Ross	Pop; soul; R&B
10	Texis	Sleigh Bells	Noise pop; indie pop; indie rock
10	K Bay	Matthew E. White	Alternative rock; indie rock
17	Lindsey Buckingham	Lindsey Buckingham	Rock; pop
17	Wolves	Candlebox	Hard rock; alternative rock
17	Dearly Beloved	Daughtry	Rock; alternative rock; hard rock
17	Ain't It Tragic	Dead Sara	Rock; hard rock
17	One Way Out	Melissa Etheridge	Heartland rock; roots rock
17	1984	Neon Christ	Hardcore punk; thrashcore
17	29: Written in Stone	Carly Pearce	Country
17	Swan Song	The Plot in You	Metalcore; post-hardcore
17	DOG BOY	ZillaKami	Alternative rap; Hip hop
17	Montero	Lil Nas X	Hip hop
17	Horizons/East	Thrice	Post-hardcore; alternative rock
24	Lifeforms	Angels & Airwaves	Alternative rock; space rock
24	This is How the World Ends	Badflower	Hard rock; rock
24	New Age Norms 3	Cold War Kids	Alternative rock; indie rock
24	We Weren't Here	Film School	Indie rock
24	Letting Go	Hayden Pedigo	Ambient; avant-garde
24	Forgiving It All	Christopher Paul Stelling	Folk; rock
24	Our Bande Apart	Third Eye Blind	Alternative rock
24	Downtown Rockers (Reissue)	Tom Tom Club	New wave; pop
24	The Beautiful Liar	X Ambassadors	Alternative rock; pop rock

=== October ===
Date	Album	Artist	Genre (s)
1	In These Silent Days	Brandi Carlile	Americana; country; folk
1	Distant Fires	Heiress	Post-metal; sludge metal; hard rock
1	Let Me Do One More	Illuminati Hotties	Indie pop
1	Trying Not To Think About It	Jojo	R&B; Pop
1	Error Boy	Lil Lotus	Post-hardcore; metalcore
1	The Metallica Blacklist	Metallica	Hard rock; heavy metal
1	American Nights (Reissue)	Plain White T's	Alternative rock; pop punk
1	Manic	Wage War	Metalcore; hard rock
8	WORD?	Atmosphere	Hip hop
8	Amanita (Reissue)	Bardo Pond	Noise rock; space rock
8	A Very Darren Crissmas	Darren Criss	Christmas
8	Open Mouth, Open Heart	Destroy Boys	Punk rock; garage rock
8	SuperBlue	Kurt Elling	Jazz; pop
8	Geist	Shannon Lay	Folk rock; punk rock
8	Mercurial World	Magdalena Bay	Synth-pop; electropop; indie pop
8	Revived Remixed Revisited	Reba McEntire	Country
8	Huffy	We Are Scientists	Indie rock; alternative rock
8	Illusory Walls	The World Is a Beautiful Place & I Am No Longer Afraid to Die	Post-rock; progressive rock; indie rock
15	Could It Get Better Than This	The 502s	Folk rock; indie rock
15	When Christmas Comes Around...	Kelly Clarkson	Christmas; pop
15	3rd Degree – The Raising	Gemini Syndrome	Alternative metal; nu metal; hard rock
15	Orange Print	Larry June	Hip hop
15	Flash (Reissue)	Moving Sidewalks	Blues rock; rock
15	Juno	Remi Wolf	Pop rock; soul; funk rock
15	The Comeback	Zac Brown Band	Country
22	A Dream About Love (EP)	Circa Survive	Post-hardcore; emo
22	A View from the Top of the World	Dream Theater	Progressive metal
22	Mr. Christmas	Brett Eldredge	Christmas; country
22	Radical	Every Time I Die	Metalcore; hardcore punk
22	Hayday	Feeble Little Horse	Indie rock
22	Ånomåly	Fuel	Hard rock; rock
22	Far In	Helado Negro	Latin; electronic
22	My Morning Jacket	My Morning Jacket	Indie rock; psychedelic rock
22	The Good Fight	Oddisee	Hip hop
22	Sympathy for Life	Parquet Courts	Indie rock; garage rock; post-punk
22	Dye	Together Pangea	Indie rock; alternative rock
22	Civilian + Cut All The Wires 2009-11	Wye Oak	Indie pop; dream pop
29	Ocean to Ocean	Tori Amos	Alternative rock; chamber pop
29	The Phantom Tomorrow	Black Veil Brides	Hard rock; heavy metal
29	Brighten	Jerry Cantrell	Rock
29	Hushed and Grim	Mastodon	Heavy metal; progressive metal
29	Into the Mystery	Needtobreathe	Alternative rock; southern rock
29	Book	They Might Be Giants	Alternative rock; indie rock
29	I Don't Live Here Anymore	The War on Drugs	Indie rock; heartland rock
29	Kin	Whitechapel	Deathcore; groove metal
31	Yum Yum Bedlam	Insane Clown Posse	Horrorcore; rap rock
31	Still Sucks	Limp Bizkit	Nu metal

=== November ===
Date	Album	Artist	Genre (s)
5	Good for You	Houndmouth	Folk rock; indie rock
5	The Solution Is Restless	Joan As Police Woman	Rock; pop
5	So Many Me	Michael League	Pop; jazz
5	Queens of The Summer Hotel	Aimee Mann	Pop; rock
5	The Future	Nathaniel Rateliff & the Night Sweats	Rock; soul; roots rock
5	Valentine	Snail Mail	Indie pop; indie rock; pop rock
5	Mantis (Reissue)	Umphrey's McGee	Progressive rock; rock
12	Macon	Jason Aldean	Country
12	Bloodless	Claire Cronin	Folk; pop
12	Acoustic	Flipsyde	Hip hop; alternative rock
12	Keyboard Fantasies Reimagined	Beverly Glenn-Copeland	Jazz; new age
12	An Evening with Silk Sonic	Silk Sonic	R&B; neo soul; funk
12	Red (Taylor's Version)	Taylor Swift	Country; pop
12	Sick Sesh	Teenage Bottlerocket	Pop-punk; punk rock
12	HEIGHTS	Walk the Moon	Alternative rock; pop rock
19	Bloodmoon: I	Converge & Chelsea Wolfe	Metalcore; hardcore punk; gothic rock
19	Marriage	Deap Vally	Alternative rock; blues rock
19	Walk Like Me	Robert DeLong	Electronic
19	Persona Non Grata	Exodus	Thrash metal
19	Everything Pale Blue	Annie Hart	Synth-pop; pop
19	What It Means to Fall Apart	Mayday Parade	Emo; punk rock; pop-punk
19	Deciphering The Message	Makaya McCraven	Hip hop; jazz
19	How Flowers Grow	Scowl	Punk rock; hardcore punk
26	Doom Crew Inc.	Black Label Society	Hard rock; heavy metal
26	Ascension Codes	Cynic	Progressive rock; progressive metal
26	Arise Dan Sartain Arise	Dan Sartain	Punk rock; rock and roll; blues
26	Live and Rare	Helmet	Alternative rock; noise rock
26	In Concert (Reissue)	Marvin Peterson	Free jazz; pop

=== December ===
Date	Album	Artist	Genre (s)
3	Wild Type Droid	Failure	Alternative rock; post-grunge
3	Against the World	Hanson	Pop rock; power pop
3	Glowing Lantern	The Mother Hips	Indie rock; folk rock
3	December's Here	New Found Glory	Punk rock; pop-punk; Christmas
3	The Odd Tape (Reissue)	Oddisee	Hip hop
3	Echo	Of Mice & Men	Metalcore
3	Peace Meter	Marissa Paternoster	Indie rock; punk rock
10	A Beautuiful Revolution Vol. 2	Common	Hip hop
10	The BBC Sessions	Green Day	Punk rock; alternative rock; pop-punk
10	Keys	Alicia Keys	R&B
10	Moral Hygiene	Ministry	Industrial rock; thrash metal
10	Unexpected	Marie Osmond	Classical; pop
17	Fear Streets Parts 1–3	Marco Beltrami	Classical
17	Gong Splat	John Dwyer	Garage rock; punk rock
17	Big Moon	William Hooker	Jazz; R&B
17	Live Life Fast	Roddy Ricch	Hip hop
17	At My Piano	Brian Wilson	Rock; pop
24	NOIR (Reissue)	Blue Sky Black Death	Alternative hip hop; trip hop
24	Great Zeppelin (Reissue)	Great White	Hard rock; Heavy metal
24	And I Return To Nothingness	Lorna Shore	Deathcore; heavy metal
24	Magic	Nas	Hip hop
24	Hitler Wears Hermes Eight	Westside Gunn	Hip hop
31	Pearl (Reissue)	Janis Joplin	Soul blues; blues rock
31	Wok World	Marty Baller & Hell Rell	Hip hop
31	Mourning Noise	Mourning Noise	Hardcore punk; horror punk
31	Radiant Moon	Watchtower	Hard rock; heavy metal
31	Judas and the Black Messiah	Various Artists	Hip hop

== Top songs on record ==
=== Billboard Hot 100 No. 1 Songs ===
- "All I Want for Christmas Is You" – Mariah Carey (2 weeks in 2019, 2 weeks in 2020, 2 weeks in 2021)
- "All Too Well (Taylor's Version)" – Taylor Swift (1 week)
- "Butter" – BTS (10 weeks)
- "Drivers License" – Olivia Rodrigo (8 weeks)
- "Easy on Me" – Adele (7 weeks)
- "Good 4 U" – Olivia Rodrigo (1 week)
- "Industry Baby" – Lil Nas X and Jack Harlow (1 week)
- "Leave the Door Open" – Silk Sonic, Bruno Mars and Anderson .Paak (2 weeks)
- "Mood" – 24kGoldn feat. Iann Dior (6 weeks in 2020, 2 weeks in 2021)
- "Montero (Call Me by Your Name)" – Lil Nas X (1 week)
- "My Universe" – Coldplay and BTS (1 week)
- "Peaches" – Justin Bieber feat. Daniel Caesar and Giveon (1 week)
- "Permission to Dance" – BTS (1 week)
- "Rapstar" – Polo G (2 weeks)
- "Save Your Tears" – The Weeknd and Ariana Grande (2 weeks)
- "Stay" – The Kid Laroi and Justin Bieber (7 weeks)
- "Up" – Cardi B (1 week)
- "Way 2 Sexy" – Drake feat. Future and Young Thug (1 week)
- "What's Next" – Drake (1 week)

=== Billboard Hot 100 Top 20 Hits ===
All songs that reached the Top 20 on the Billboard Hot 100 chart during the year, complete with peak chart placement.

- "1 Step Forward, 3 Steps Back" – Olivia Rodrigo (#19)
- "100 Mil'" – J. Cole and Bas (#14)
- "34+35" – Ariana Grande feat. Doja Cat and Megan Thee Stallion (#2)
- "7 Summers" – Morgan Wallen (#6 in 2020, #18 in 2021)
- "7AM on Bridle Path" – Drake (#16)
- "95 South" – J. Cole (#8)
- "A Holly Jolly Christmas" – Burl Ives (#4)
- "ABCDEFU" – Gayle (#15)
- "All I Want for Christmas Is You" – Mariah Carey (#1)
- "All Too Well (Taylor's Version)" – Taylor Swift (#1)
- "Already Dead" – Juice Wrld (#20)
- "Am I the Only One" – Aaron Lewis (#14)
- "Amari" – J. Cole (#5)
- "Anyone" – Justin Bieber (#6)
- "Applying Pressure" – J. Cole (#13)
- "Astronaut in the Ocean" – Masked Wolf (#6)
- "Back in Blood" – Pooh Shiesty feat. Lil Durk (#13)
- "Bad Habits" – Ed Sheeran (#2)
- "Bang!" – AJR (#8)
- "Beat Box" – SpotemGottem feat. Pooh Shiesty or DaBaby (#12)
- "Beautiful Mistakes" – Maroon 5 feat. Megan Thee Stallion (#13)
- "Beggin'" – Måneskin (#13)
- "Best Friend" – Saweetie feat. Doja Cat (#14)
- "Better Together" – Luke Combs (#15)
- "Blinding Lights" – The Weeknd (#1 in 2020, #3 in 2021)
- "Body" – Megan Thee Stallion (#12 in 2020, #16 in 2021)
- "Brutal" – Olivia Rodrigo (#12)
- "Bubbly" – Young Thug, Drake and Travis Scott (#20)
- "Butter" – BTS (#1)
- "Calling My Phone" – Lil Tjay feat. 6lack (#3)
- "Champagne Poetry" – Drake (#4)
- "Christmas (Baby Please Come Home)" – Darlene Love (#17)
- "Cold Heart (Pnau remix)" – Elton John and Dua Lipa (#11)
- "Dakiti" – Bad Bunny and Jhay Cortez (#5 in 2020, #17 in 2021)
- "Deja Vu" – Olivia Rodrigo (#3)
- "Drivers License" – Olivia Rodrigo (#1)
- "Dynamite" – BTS (#1 in 2020, #5 in 2021)
- "Easy on Me" – Adele (#1)
- "Enough for You" – Olivia Rodrigo (#14)
- "Escape Plan" – Travis Scott (#11)
- "Essence" – Wizkid feat. Tems and Justin Bieber (#9)
- "Every Chance I Get" – DJ Khaled feat. Lil Baby and Lil Durk (#20)
- "Fair Trade" – Drake feat. Travis Scott (#3)
- "Family Ties" – Baby Keem and Kendrick Lamar (#18)
- "Fancy Like" – Walker Hayes (#3)
- "Favorite Crime" – Olivia Rodrigo (#16)
- "Feliz Navidad" – José Feliciano (#6)
- "For the Night" – Pop Smoke feat. Lil Baby and DaBaby (#6 in 2020, #11 in 2021)
- "Forever After All" – Luke Combs (#2 in 2020, #12 in 2021)
- "Girls Want Girls" – Drake feat. Lil Baby (#2)
- "Go Crazy" – Chris Brown and Young Thug (#3)
- "Good 4 U" – Olivia Rodrigo (#1)
- "Good Days" – SZA (#9)
- "Good Time" – Niko Moon (#20)
- "Happier" – Olivia Rodrigo (#15)
- "Happier Than Ever" – Billie Eilish (#11)
- "Happy Holiday / The Holiday Season" – Andy Williams (#18)
- "Hats Off" – Lil Baby, Lil Durk and Travis Scott (#16)
- "Having Our Way" – Migos feat. Drake (#15)
- "Heartbreak Anniversary" – Giveon (#16)
- "Heat Waves" – Glass Animals (#7)
- "Hold On" – Justin Bieber (#20)
- "Holy" – Justin Bieber feat. Chance the Rapper (#3 in 2020, #4 in 2021)
- "Hurricane" – Kanye West (#6)
- "I Drink Wine" – Adele (#18)
- "I Hate U" – SZA (#7)
- "I Hope" – Gabby Barrett feat. Charlie Puth (#3 in 2020, #8 in 2021)
- "If I Didn't Love You" – Jason Aldean and Carrie Underwood (#15)
- "In the Bible" – Drake feat. Lil Durk and Giveon (#7)
- "Industry Baby" – Lil Nas X and Jack Harlow (#1)
- "Interlude" – J. Cole (#8)
- "It's Beginning to Look a Lot Like Christmas" – Michael Bublé (#20)
- "It's Beginning to Look a Lot Like Christmas" – Perry Como and The Fontane Sisters with Mitchell Ayres and His Orchestra (#12 in 2020, #15 in 2021)
- "It's the Most Wonderful Time of the Year" – Andy Williams (#5)
- "Jail" – Kanye West (#10)
- "Jingle Bell Rock" – Bobby Helms (#3)
- "Junya" – Kanye West (#16)
- "Kings & Queens" – Ava Max (#13 in 2020, #15 in 2021)
- "Kiss Me More" – Doja Cat feat. SZA (#3)
- "Knife Talk" – Drake feat. 21 Savage and Project Pat (#4)
- "Last Christmas" – Wham! (#9)
- "Late at Night" – Roddy Ricch (#20)
- "Laugh Now Cry Later" – Drake feat. Lil Durk (#2 in 2020, #7 in 2021)
- "Leave Before You Love Me" – Marshmello and Jonas Brothers (#19)
- "Leave the Door Open" – Silk Sonic, Bruno Mars and Anderson .Paak (#1)
- "Lemon Pepper Freestyle" – Drake feat. Rick Ross (#3)
- "Lemonade" – Internet Money and Gunna feat. Don Toliver and Nav (#6 in 2020, #12 in 2021)
- "Let Go My Hand" – J. Cole, Bas and 6lack (#19)
- "Let It Snow, Let It Snow, Let It Snow" – Dean Martin (#8)
- "Levitating" – Dua Lipa feat. DaBaby (#2)
- "Lonely" – Justin Bieber and Benny Blanco (#12)
- "Love All" – Drake feat. Jay-Z (#10)
- "Love Story (Taylor's Version)" – Taylor Swift (#11)
- "Miss the Rage" – Trippie Redd and Playboi Carti (#11)
- "Montero (Call Me by Your Name)" – Lil Nas X (#1)
- "Mood" – 24kGoldn feat. Iann Dior (#1)
- "Moon" – Kanye West (#17)
- "More Than My Hometown" – Morgan Wallen (#15 in 2020, #16 in 2021)
- "Motley Crew" – Post Malone (#13)
- "My Ex's Best Friend" – Machine Gun Kelly feat. Blackbear (#20)
- "My Life" – J. Cole, 21 Savage and Morray (#2)
- "My Universe" – Coldplay and BTS (#1)
- "N 2 Deep" – Drake feat. Future (#12)
- "Need to Know" – Doja Cat (#8)
- "No Friends in the Industry" – Drake (#11)
- "No Love" – Summer Walker and SZA (#13)
- "Off the Grid" – Kanye West (#11)
- "Oh My God" – Adele (#5)
- "Ok Ok" – Kanye West (#12)
- "On Me" – Lil Baby (#15)
- "One Right Now" – Post Malone and The Weeknd (#6)
- "Papi's Home" – Drake (#8)
- "Peaches" – Justin Bieber feat. Daniel Caesar and Giveon (#1)
- "Permission to Dance" – BTS (#1)
- "Pipe Down" – Drake (#14)
- "Positions" – Ariana Grande (#1 in 2020, #2 in 2021)
- "Praise God" – Kanye West (#20)
- "Pride Is the Devil" – J. Cole and Lil Baby (#7)
- "Punchin' the Clock" – J. Cole (#20)
- "Race My Mind" – Drake (#18)
- "Rapstar" – Polo G (#1)
- "Rockin' Around the Christmas Tree" – Brenda Lee (#2)
- "Rudolph the Red-Nosed Reindeer" – Gene Autry (#16)
- "Ruff Ryders' Anthem" – DMX (#16)
- "Rumors" – Lizzo and Cardi B (#4)
- "Run Rudolph Run" – Chuck Berry (#10)
- "Santa Tell Me" – Ariana Grande (#17)
- "Save Your Tears" – The Weeknd and Ariana Grande (#1)
- "Seeing Green" – Nicki Minaj, Drake and Lil Wayne (#12)
- "Shivers" – Ed Sheeran (#5)
- "Skate" – Silk Sonic, Bruno Mars and Anderson .Paak (#14)
- "Ski" – Young Thug and Gunna (#18)
- "Sleigh Ride" – The Ronettes (#13)
- "Smokin Out the Window" – Silk Sonic, Bruno Mars and Anderson .Paak (#5)
- "Solid" – Young Thug and Gunna feat. Drake (#12)
- "State of Grace (Taylor's Version)" – Taylor Swift (#18)
- "Stay" – The Kid Laroi and Justin Bieber (#1)
- "Street Runner" – Rod Wave (#16)
- "Streets" – Doja Cat (#16)
- "Super Gremlin" – Kodak Black (#20)
- "Take My Breath" – The Weeknd (#6)
- "Thats What I Want" – Lil Nas X (#10)
- "The Christmas Song (Merry Christmas to You)" – Nat King Cole (#11)
- "The Good Ones" – Gabby Barrett (#19)
- "Therefore I Am" – Billie Eilish (#2 in 2020, #12 in 2021)
- "Thot Shit" – Megan Thee Stallion (#16)
- "Thriller" – Michael Jackson (#4 in 1984, #19 in 2021)
- "Tombstone" – Rod Wave (#11)
- "Traitor" – Olivia Rodrigo (#9)
- "TSU" – Drake (#9)
- "Underneath the Tree" – Kelly Clarkson (#12)
- "Up" – Cardi B (#1)
- "Wants and Needs" – Drake feat. Lil Baby (#2)
- "Wasted on You" – Morgan Wallen (#9)
- "Way 2 Sexy" – Drake feat. Future and Young Thug (#1)
- "What You Know Bout Love" – Pop Smoke (#9)
- "What's Next" – Drake (#1)
- "White Christmas" – Bing Crosby (#12 in 1962, #20 in 2021)
- "Who Want Smoke??" – Nardo Wick feat. G Herbo, Lil Durk and 21 Savage (#17)
- "Whole Lotta Money" – Bia feat. Nicki Minaj (#16)
- "Whoopty" – CJ (#10)
- "Wild Side" – Normani feat. Cardi B (#14)
- "Without You" – The Kid Laroi and Miley Cyrus (#8)
- "Wockesha" – Moneybagg Yo (#20)
- "WusYaName" – Tyler, the Creator feat. YoungBoy Never Broke Again and Ty Dolla Sign (#14)
- "Yonaguni" – Bad Bunny (#10)
- "You Broke Me First" – Tate McRae (#17)
- "You Right" – Doja Cat and The Weeknd (#11)
- "You're Mines Still" – Yung Bleu feat. Drake (#18)
- "Your Power" – Billie Eilish (#10)

== Deaths ==
- January 1 – Misty Morgan, 75, country music singer
- January 7 –
  - Deezer D, 55, rapper, singer
  - Jamie O'Hara, 70, country music singer, songwriter
- January 8 – Ed Bruce, 81, country music singer, songwriter
- January 11 –
  - Howard Johnson, 79, jazz musician
  - Don Miller, 80, pop singer
- January 13 –
  - Tim Bogert, 76, rock bassist
  - Duke Bootee, 69, rapper, producer and songwriter
  - Sylvain Sylvain, 69, glam rock guitarist
- January 14 –
  - Duranice Pace, 62, gospel singer
  - Larry Willoughby, 73, country music singer, songwriter
- January 16 –
  - Jason Cope, 43, country music guitarist
  - Phil Spector, 81, record producer, pop musician and songwriter
- January 17 –
  - Junior Mance, 92, jazz pianist
  - Sammy Nestico, 96, jazz composer and arranger
- January 18 – Jimmie Rodgers, 87, pop singer
- January 21 – Randy Parton, 67, country music singer, songwriter
- January 22 – James Purify, 76, R&B singer (James & Bobby Purify)
- January 24 – Tom Stevens, 64, alternative country music bassist
- January 29 – Grady Gaines, 86, blues saxophonist
- January 30 – Double K, 43, rapper (People Under the Stairs)
- February 2 – Aaron Wegelin, indie rock drummer
- February 3 –
  - Anne Feeney, 69, folk singer-songwriter
  - Jim Weatherly, 77, pop and country singer, songwriter
- February 4 –
  - Matt Harris, power pop bassist
  - Nolan Porter, 71, R&B singer-songwriter
  - Gil Saunders, soul singer
- February 5 – Douglas Miller, 71, gospel singer
- February 7 – Elliot Mazer, 79, record producer and audio engineer
- February 8 – Mary Wilson, 76, soul singer (The Supremes)
- February 9 –
  - Chick Corea, 79, jazz keyboardist and composer
  - Cedrick Cotton, 46, R&B singer
- February 10 – Lee Sexton, 92, bluegrass banjoist
- February 12 – Milford Graves, 79, jazz drummer
- February 14 – Ari Gold, 47, R&B singer
- February 16 – Carman, 65, contemporary Christian singer
- February 18 –
  - Prince Markie Dee, 52, rapper (The Fat Boys)
  - Miles Seaton, 41, indie rock singer
- February 19 –
  - James Burke, 70, soul singer
  - Jerold Ottley, 86, choral conductor
- February 20 – Gene Taylor, 68, rock keyboardist
- February 26 – Bob James, 68, hard rock singer
- February 28 – Ian North, 68, power pop singer and guitarist
- March 1 – Ralph Peterson Jr., 58, jazz drummer
- March 2 – Mark Goffeney, 51, rock bassist
- March 3 – Duffy Jackson, 67, jazz drummer
- March 4 – Barbara Ess, 72, post-punk multi-instrumentalist
- March 5 – Michael Stanley, 72, rock singer-songwriter and guitarist
- March 11 –
  - Ray Campi, 86, rockabilly musician
  - Jewlia Eisenberg, 50, avant-rock singer
- March 14 –
  - Reggie Warren, 52, R&B singer
  - Taylor Dee, 33, country music singer
- March 17 –
  - Matt Miller, 34, indie rock keyboardist
  - Freddie Redd, 92, jazz keyboardist
  - Corey Steger, 42, metalcore guitarist
- March 18 – Paul Jackson, 73, jazz fusion bassist
- March 19 – Gary Leib, 65, new wave keyboardist
- March 20 – Dan Sartain, 39, garage rock and rockabilly singer-songwriter
- March 23 – Don Heffington, 70, roots rock drummer
- March 25 – Tavish Maloney, 24, emo guitarist
- March 26 – Brett Bradshaw, 50, glam metal drummer
- April 2 – Morris Dickerson, 71, funk bassist and singer
- April 9 – DMX, 50, rapper, songwriter and actor
- April 10 – Bob Petric, indie rock guitarist
- April 14 – Rusty Young, 75, country rock singer-songwriter and guitarist
- April 16 – Mike Mitchell, 77, rock guitarist
- April 17 – Black Rob, 51, rapper
- April 18 – Paul Oscher, 71, blues singer
- April 19 – Jim Steinman, 73, rock lyricist, composer, pianist, and record producer
- April 21 – Joe Long, 88, pop rock bassist
- April 23 – Shock G, 57, rapper (Digital Underground)
- April 25 – Denny Freeman, 76, blues guitarist
- April 29 –
  - Johnny Crawford, 75, pop singer
  - Tony Markellis, 68, jam band bassist
  - Will Mecum, 48, stoner rock guitarist
- April 30 – John Dee Holeman, 92, Piedmont blues guitarist, singer, songwriter
- May 1 – Wondress Hutchinson, 56, dance singer
- May 2 – Tommy West, 78, music producer and singer-songwriter
- May 3 – Lloyd Price, 88, singer-songwriter and businessman
- May 6 – Pervis Staples, 85, gospel singer
- May 8 – Curtis Fuller, 86, jazz trombonist
- May 13 –
  - Norman Simmons, 91, jazz pianist and arranger
  - Jack Terricloth, 50, dark cabaret singer
  - Bill Tsamis, 60, metal guitarist
- May 15 – Mario Pavone, 80, jazz pianist
- May 16 – Patsy Bruce, 81, country songwriter
- May 17 – Neal Ford, 78, psychedelic rock singer
- May 19 – Alix Dobkin, 80, folk singer-songwriter and guitarist
- May 20 – Roger Hawkins, 75, rock and soul drummer
- May 24
  - John Davis, 66, dance pop music singer
  - Samuel E. Wright, 74, pop singer and actor
- May 29
  - B.J. Thomas, 78, rock and pop singer
  - Johnny Trudell, 82, jazz trumpeter
- May 31 – Lil Loaded, 20, rapper
- June 3 – Karla Burns, 66, opera singer
- June 7 – David C. Lewis, soft rock and new age keyboardist
- June 8 – Dean Parrish, 79, soul singer
- June 9 – Juan Nelson, 62, blues rock bassist
- June 18 – Gift of Gab, 50, rapper (Blackalicious)
- June 20 –
  - Gianna Rolandi, 68, opera singer
  - Jeanne Lamon, 71, violinist and conductor
- June 23 – Ellen McIlwaine, 75, psychedelic rock and blues singer, guitarist
- June 26 –
  - Jon Hassell, 84, jazz trumpeter
  - Johnny Solinger, 55, hard rock singer (Skid Row)
- June 28 – Burton Greene, 84, free jazz pianist
- July 1 – Bryan St. Pere, 52, alternative rock drummer
- July 4 – Sanford Clark, 85, rockabilly singer
- July 9 – Andrew Williams, 49, Christian rock drummer
- July 10 –
  - Byron Berline, 77, bluegrass fiddler
  - Chris Hutka, 35, post-hardcore singer
- July 11 – Juini Booth, 73, jazz bassist
- July 14 –
  - Gary Corbett, 63, blues rock keyboardist
  - Jeff LaBar, 58, glam metal and blues rock guitarist (Cinderella)
- July 16 – Biz Markie, 57, rapper
- July 17 – Robby Steinhardt, 71, progressive rock singer and violinist (Kansas)
- July 19 – Chuck E. Weiss, 76, blues rock singer-songwriter
- July 21 – Clarence McDonald, 76, pianist, composer, arranger and producer
- July 25 – Count M'Butu, 75, blues rock percussionist (The Derek Trucks Band)
- July 26 –
  - Joey Jordison, 46, heavy metal drummer (Slipknot)
  - Mike Howe, 55, heavy metal singer
- July 27 – Willie Winfield, 91, doo-wop singer
- July 28 – Dusty Hill, 72, rock singer and bassist (ZZ Top)
- July 29 – Gonzoe, 45, rapper (Kausion)
- August 1 – Paul Cotton, 78, country rock singer
- August 3 – Kelli Hand, 56, techno DJ
- August 4 –
  - Razzy Bailey, 82, country singer
  - Paul Johnson, 50, house DJ
- August 7 – Dennis Johnson, 70, saxophonist
- August 9 – Chucky Thompson, 53, record producer
- August 11 –
  - Mike Finnigan, 76, rock and jazz keyboardist
  - Roy Gaines, 83, electric blues guitarist
  - Caroline Peyton, 69, folk singer songwriter
- August 12 – Ronnell Bright, 91, jazz pianist
- August 13 –
  - Baba Zumbi, 49, rapper
  - Nanci Griffith, 68, folk singer songwriter
- August 17 – Squeak, 26, hip hop producer
- August 20 –
  - Tom T. Hall, 85, country singer songwriter
  - Larry Harlow, 82, salsa keyboardist
  - Michael Morgan, 64, classical conductor
- August 21 –
  - Bill Emerson, 83, bluegrass banjoist
  - Don Everly, 84, country-rock singer and songwriter (The Everly Brothers)
- August 22 – Eric Wagner, doom metal singer
- August 26 – Kenny Malone, 83, country music drummer
- August 29 –
  - John Drake, 74, rock singer
  - Ron Bushy, 79, psychedelic rock drummer
- August 30 – Lee Williams, 75, gospel singer
- September 1 – Carol Fran, 87, soul blues singer and pianist
- September 5 – Rickie Lee Reynolds, 72, rock guitarist
- September 7 – Warren Storm, 84, swamp pop singer and drummer
- September 8 – Susan Anway, 70, indie rock singer
- September 12 – Don Maddox, 90, country singer
- September 13 – George Wein, 95, jazz pianist
- September 15 – Leonard Gibbs, 73, jazz percussionist
- September 16 – Jane Powell, 92, pop singer
- September 20 –
  - Sarah Dash, 76, R&B and funk singer
  - Warner Williams, 91, blues guitarist
- September 22 – Bob Moore, 88, country music bassist
- September 23 – Sue Thompson, 96, pop and country singer
- September 24 – Pee Wee Ellis, 80, jazz and soul saxophonist
- September 26 – George Frayne IV, 77, country rock singer and keyboardist
- September 27 – Andrea Martin, 49, R&B singer and songwriter
- September 28 –
  - Karan Armstrong, 79, opera soprano
  - Lonnie Smith, 79, jazz organist
- September 29 – Mike Renzi, 80, jazz pianist and conductor
- September 30 – Carlisle Floyd, 95, opera composer
- October 1 – Raymond Gniewek, 89, classical violinist
- October 8 – Jem Targal, 74, psychedelic rock bassist
- October 9 – Dee Pop, 65, post-punk drummer
- October 11 – Deon Estus, 65, R&B bassist and singer
- October 14 –
  - Emani 22, 22, R&B singer
  - Phil Leadbetter, 59, bluegrass resonator guitarist
  - Tom Morey, 86, jazz drummer
- October 15 – Regi Hargis, 70, funk guitarist and singer
- October 16 – Ron Tutt, 83, rock drummer
- October 17 – Bruce Gaston, 74, classical instrumentalist
- October 21 –
  - Tommy DeBarge, 64, funk bassist and singer
  - Robin McNamara, 74, pop rock singer-songwriter
- October 22 – Jay Black, 82, pop rock singer
- October 24 –
  - Willie Cobbs, 89, blues singer and harmonica player
  - Sonny Osborne, 83, bluegrass banjoist
- October 26 – Rose Lee Maphis, 98, country singer
- October 27 – William Shelby, 65, funk keyboardist
- November 1 –
  - Emmett Chapman, 85, jazz guitarist
  - Pat Martino, 77, jazz guitarist
- November 2 – Ronnie Wilson, 73, funk instrumentalist
- November 8 – Margo Guryan, pop singer-songwriter
- November 10 – Mike Gresema, 56, hard rock drummer
- November 11 – John Goodsall, 68, progressive rock and jazz guitarist
- November 13 – Philip Margo, 79, doo-wop singer
- November 17 –
  - Young Dolph, 36, rapper
  - Keith Allison, 79, garage rock bassist
  - Dave Frishberg, 88, jazz pianist and songwriter
- November 18 − Slide Hampton, 89, jazz trombonist
- November 20 − Billy Hinsche, 70, pop singer, guitarist and keyboardist
- November 21 − Yul Anderson, 63, blues and gospel singer, guitarist and pianist
- November 22 − Joanne Shenandoah, 63, folk singer-songwriter and guitarist
- November 24 − Marilyn McLeod, 82, R&B singer and songwriter
- November 26 − Stephen Sondheim, 91, film and theater composer and lyricist
- December 1 – Alvin Lucier, 90, experimental composer and sound artist
- December 4 − Stonewall Jackson, 89, country music singer
- December 7 − Greg Tate, 63, multi-genre guitarist and music critic
- December 8 −
  - Gil Bridges, 80, rock saxophonist
  - Barry Harris, 91, jazz pianist
  - Ralph Tavares, 79, R&B singer
- December 9 − David Lasley, 74, pop and R&B singer
- December 10 − Michael Nesmith, 78, rock and country singer, songwriter and guitarist (The Monkees)
- December 13 − Joe Simon, 85, R&B and soul singer
- December 15 − Hub, 62, hip hop bassist (The Roots)
- December 16 − Wanda Young, 78, R&B singer
- December 18 − Kangol Kid, 55, rapper (UTFO)
- December 19 − Drakeo the Ruler, 28, rapper
- December 20 − Paul Mitchell, 53, R&B singer
- December 24 − J.D. Crowe, 84, bluegrass banjo player
- December 25 − Tiffini Hale, 54, pop singer (The Party)
- December 30 − Stephen J. Lawrence, 82, television composer

== See also ==
- 2021 in music
