= Free Larry Hoover Benefit Concert =

Benefit concert from rappers Kanye West and Drake

- One-off concert by Kanye West with special guest Drake
- Location: Los Angeles, California, U.S.
- Date: December 9, 2021
- Duration: 124 minutes
- No. of shows: 1
- Producers: Amazon Prime Video; IMAX Corporation
Kanye West concert chronology
Saint Pablo Tour (2016)	Free Larry Hoover Benefit Concert (2021)	Vultures Listening Experience (2024)
Drake concert chronology
Assassination Vacation Tour (2019)	Free Larry Hoover Benefit Concert (2021)	It's All a Blur Tour (2023–2024)

The Kanye with Special Guest Drake Free Larry Hoover Benefit Concert, or simply the Free Larry Hoover Benefit Concert, was a one-off concert by American rapper Kanye West (accompanied by his choir, the Sunday Service Choir) and Canadian rapper Drake. It was held at the Los Angeles Memorial Coliseum in Los Angeles, California, on December 9, 2021. A benefit concert, it was designed to bring awareness about prison and sentencing reform in the United States through the case of incarcerated former gangster, Larry Hoover.

After a lengthy feud and album sales battles regarding their respective 2021 releases Donda and Certified Lover Boy, West and Drake briefly stopped under the guidance of J Prince. The concert was livestreamed by Amazon via Prime Video and Twitch, and was the first concert to be livestreamed directly in theaters with IMAX screens.

An edited and audio remixed version, directed by Aus Taylor, was later released on Amazon Prime Video on demand on December 17, 2021. The edit removes Drake's performance (with the exception of his Forever duet with West) for unspecified reasons.

== Background ==
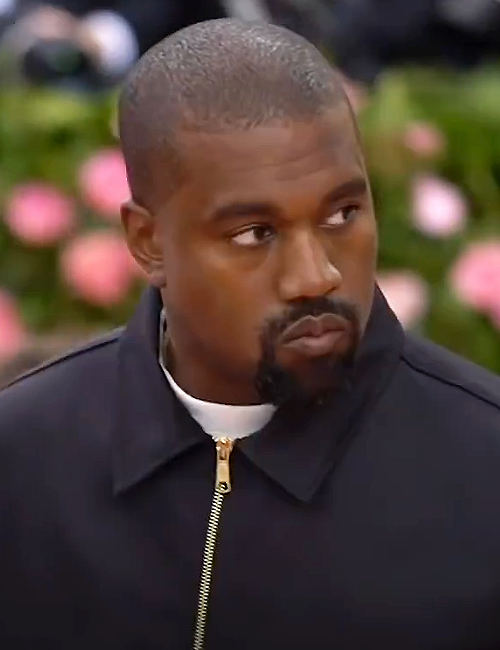
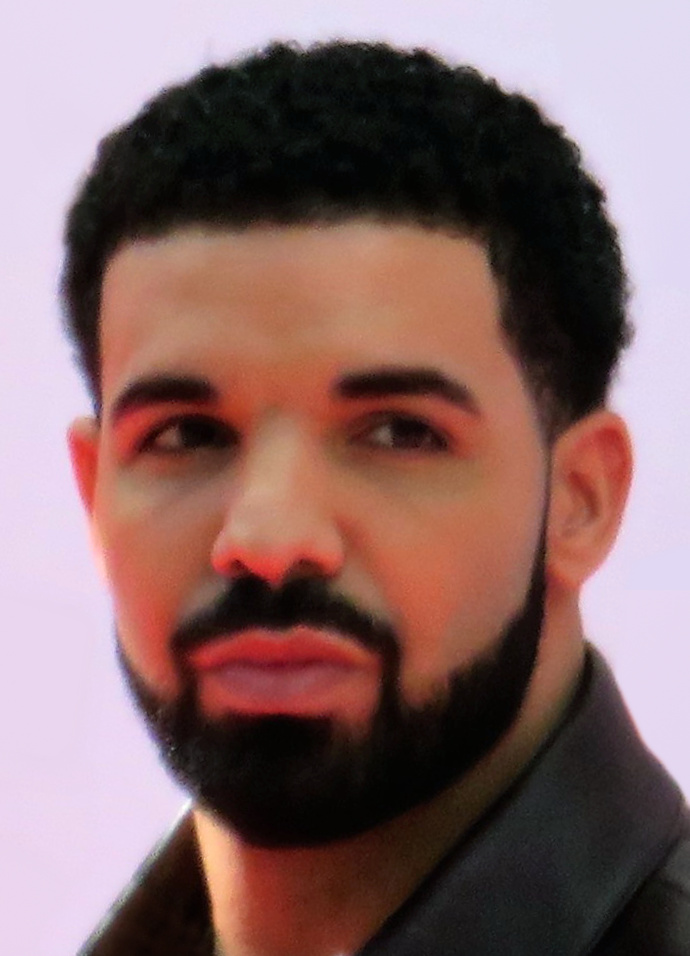
West (left, pictured in 2019) and Drake (right, pictured in 2017) had been feuding online prior to planning the concert

== Promotion ==
=== Merchandise ===
On the night of the concert, West would announce a collection of "Free Larry Hoover" clothing to coincide with the event. Created by Yeezy Gap as part of West's "Engineered by Balenciaga" series, they were exclusively available for purchase on the Amazon Fashion store. Clothing consisted of t-shirts, hoodies, jumpsuits, baseball tees, hats, and repurposed Levi's jeans, with prices ranging from USD$60 to USD$400. All merchandise featured the words "Free Hoover" printed in all caps in white block letters. West and Drake would wear the merchandise during the show itself.

== Ticket sales ==
=== Amazon Music broadcast ===
There are currently no verifiable published ticket sale records available for this concert, but multiple sources estimate that there were about 70,000 people in attendance.

=== Theatrical broadcast ===
Along with its broadcast on Amazon Music, select IMAX theaters in the United States would play the concert film. Tickets for the film would first appear online on December 6, 2021, through multiple ticket websites.

Jennifer Salke, head of Amazon Studios, expressed that the company was "extremely proud to be working with Kanye and Drake on this historic concert in support of a cause they are both so passionate about, and to collaborate across Amazon for this epic entertainment event".

== Setlist ==
The show included an introduction from the Sunday Service Choir followed by two sets from West, separated by a Drake set. Songs performed by West were picked out by Drake, and include his biggest songs throughout his career. Drake's set consisted of newer material, most of it from his recent album Certified Lover Boy.

=== Sunday Service ===
1. Carl Orff - O Fortuna (cover)
2. The Fugees - Ready or Not (cover)
3. Adele - Easy On Me (cover)
4. Sunday Service Choir - Back to Life (cover of Soul II Soul - Back to Life (However Do You Want Me))
5. Sunday Service Choir - Puer
6. Sunday Service Choir - Ultralight Beam (cover of Kanye West's Ultralight Beam)

=== Kanye West set 1 ===
1. Kanye West - Praise God
2. Kanye West - Jesus Walks
3. Kanye West - All Falls Down
4. Kanye West - Gold Digger
5. Kanye West - Touch the Sky
6. Kanye West - Stronger
7. Kanye West - All of the Lights
8. Kanye West - Black Skinhead
9. Kanye West - All Day
10. Kanye West - Mercy
11. Kanye West - Good Life
12. Kanye West - Flashing Lights
13. Kanye West - Say You Will
14. Kanye West - I Wonder
15. Drake - Find Your Love (cover)
16. Kanye West - Runaway
17. Kanye West - Can't Tell Me Nothing (with Drake)

=== Drake ===
1. Kanye West - 24 (cover)
2. Drake - Wants and Needs
3. Drake - No Friends in the Industry
4. Drake - What's Next
5. Future ft. Drake - Life Is Good
6. Drake - IMY2
7. Drake - Laugh Now Cry Later
8. Drake - Girls Want Girls
9. Drake - In the Bible
10. Drake - Way 2 Sexy
11. Drake - Knife Talk
12. Drake - God's Plan (with Kanye West)

=== Kanye West set 2 ===
1. Kanye West - Hurricane
2. Kanye West - Father Stretch My Hands Pt. 1
3. Jay-Z & Kanye West - Niggas in Paris (West verse only)
4. Kanye West - Bound 2
5. Kanye West - Come to Life
6. Drake & Kanye West - Forever
