= Hot R&B Songs =

Billboard chart

Hot R&B Songs is a chart released weekly by Billboard in the United States. It lists the 25 most popular contemporary R&B songs, calculated weekly by airplay on All-Format radio stations, digital download sales and streaming data. It was established on October 11, 2012, as a way to highlight "the differences between pure R&B and rap titles in the overall, wide-ranging R&B/hip-hop field" and serves, along with the Hot Rap Songs chart, as a distillation of the overall Hot R&B/Hip-Hop Songs chart.

== Song achievements ==
=== Most weeks at number one ===
Weeks	Artist(s)	Song	Year(s)	Ref.
48	The Weeknd	"Blinding Lights"	2020–21	
43	Bruno Mars	"I Just Might"	2026	
34	Leon Thomas	"Mutt"	2025	
32	SZA	"Snooze"	2023–24	
30	SZA	"Kill Bill"	2022–23	
22	Tommy Richman	"Million Dollar Baby"	2024	
20	Drake featuring Wizkid and Kyla	"One Dance"	2016	
20	The Weeknd featuring Daft Punk	"Starboy"	2016–17	
20	Bruno Mars	"That's What I Like"	2017	
20	The Weeknd and Playboi Carti	"Timeless"	2024–25	

== Artist achievements ==
=== Most number-one songs ===
Number	Artist	Song	Date
12	The Weeknd	"Earned It"	April 11, 2015
12	The Weeknd	"Can't Feel My Face"	July 18, 2015
12	The Weeknd	"The Hills"	October 3, 2015
12	The Weeknd	"Starboy" (featuring Daft Punk)	October 15, 2016
12	The Weeknd	"Call Out My Name"	April 14, 2018
12	The Weeknd	"Heartless"	December 14, 2019
12	The Weeknd	"Blinding Lights"	March 7, 2020
12	The Weeknd	"You Right" (with Doja Cat)	September 4, 2021
12	The Weeknd	"Sacrifice"	January 22, 2022
12	The Weeknd	"Creepin'" (with Metro Boomin & 21 Savage)	December 17, 2022
12	The Weeknd	"Die for You" (with Ariana Grande)	March 11, 2023
12	The Weeknd	"Timeless" (with Playboi Carti)	October 12, 2024
10	Drake	"Hold On, We're Going Home" (featuring Majid Jordan)	October 12, 2013
10	Drake	"Tuesday" (ILoveMakonnen featuring Drake)	November 29, 2014
10	Drake	"Work" (Rihanna featuring Drake)	February 13, 2016
10	Drake	"One Dance" (featuring Wizkid & Kyla)	May 7, 2016
10	Drake	"Don't Matter to Me" (with Michael Jackson)	July 14, 2018
10	Drake	"No Guidance" (Chris Brown featuring Drake)	September 7, 2019
10	Drake	"Race My Mind"	September 18, 2021
10	Drake	"Slime You Out" (featuring SZA)	September 20, 2023
10	Drake	"Act II: Date @ 8" (4Batz featuring Drake)	March 23, 2024
10	Drake	"Solar Eclipse" (with Don Toliver)	October 17, 2026
7	SZA	"The Weekend"	July 1, 2017
7	SZA	"I Hate U"	December 18, 2021
7	SZA	"Kill Bill"	December 24, 2022
7	SZA	"Snooze"	July 29, 2023
7	SZA	"Slime You Out" (Drake featuring SZA)	September 20, 2023
7	SZA	"Saturn"	March 9, 2024
7	SZA	"30 for 30" (with Kendrick Lamar)	January 4, 2025
6	Rihanna	"Diamonds"	October 20, 2012
6	Rihanna	"FourFiveSeconds" (with Kanye West & Paul McCartney)	February 21, 2015
6	Rihanna	"Work" (featuring Drake)	February 13, 2016
6	Rihanna	"Needed Me"	September 24, 2016
6	Rihanna	"Wild Thoughts" (DJ Khaled featuring Rihanna & Bryson Tiller)	July 15, 2017
6	Rihanna	"Lift Me Up"	November 12, 2022
6	Justin Bieber	"No Brainer" (DJ Khaled featuring Justin Bieber, Chance the Rapper and Quavo)	August 11, 2018
6	Justin Bieber	"Yummy"	January 18, 2020
6	Justin Bieber	"Intentions" (featuring Quavo)	February 22, 2020
6	Justin Bieber	"Peaches" (featuring Daniel Caesar and Giveon)	April 3, 2021
6	Justin Bieber	"Essence" (Wizkid featuring Justin Bieber & Tems)	September 11, 2021
6	Justin Bieber	"Yukon"	July 26, 2025
5	Bruno Mars	"That's What I Like"	March 4, 2017
5	Bruno Mars	"Finesse" (featuring Cardi B)	January 20, 2018
5	Bruno Mars	"Leave the Door Open" (with Anderson .Paak as Silk Sonic)	March 20, 2021
5	Bruno Mars	"Smokin Out the Window" (with Anderson .Paak as Silk Sonic)	November 20, 2021
5	Bruno Mars	"I Just Might"	January 24, 2026
3	Chris Brown	"Freaky Friday" (Lil Dicky featuring Chris Brown)	April 21, 2018
3	Chris Brown	"No Guidance" (featuring Drake)	September 7, 2019
3	Chris Brown	"Go Crazy" (with Young Thug)	December 26, 2020
3	Doja Cat	"Say So"	May 16, 2020
3	Doja Cat	"You Right" (with The Weeknd)	September 4, 2021
3	Doja Cat	"Woman"	March 12, 2022
3	Khalid	"Young Dumb & Broke"	November 4, 2017
3	Khalid	"Better"	January 19, 2019
3	Khalid	"Talk"	May 4, 2019
3	Beyoncé	"Drunk in Love (featuring Jay-Z)	January 4, 2014
3	Beyoncé	"7/11"	December 20, 2014
3	Beyoncé	"Break My Soul"	August 4, 2022

=== Most number-one debuts ===
Number	Artist	Song	Date
6	The Weeknd	"Can't Feel My Face"	July 18, 2015
6	The Weeknd	"Call Out My Name"	April 14, 2018
6	The Weeknd	"Sacrifice"	January 22, 2022
6	The Weeknd	"Creepin'" (with Metro Boomin & 21 Savage)	December 17, 2022
6	The Weeknd	"Die for You" (with Ariana Grande)	March 11, 2023
6	The Weeknd	"Timeless" (with Playboi Carti)	October 12, 2024
5	Drake	"Work" (Rihanna featuring Drake)	February 13, 2016
5	Drake	"Don't Matter to Me" (with Michael Jackson)	July 14, 2018
5	Drake	"Race My Mind"	September 18, 2021
5	Drake	"Slime You Out" (featuring SZA)	September 20, 2023
5	Drake	"Solar Eclipse" (with Don Toliver)	October 17, 2026
4	Justin Bieber	"No Brainer" (DJ Khaled featuring Justin Bieber, Chance the Rapper and Quavo)	August 11, 2018
4	Justin Bieber	"Intentions" (featuring Quavo)	February 22, 2020
4	Justin Bieber	"Peaches" (featuring Daniel Caesar and Giveon)	April 3, 2021
4	Justin Bieber	"Yukon"	July 26, 2025
3	Rihanna	"Diamonds"	October 20, 2012
3	Rihanna	"Work" (featuring Drake)	February 13, 2016
3	Rihanna	"Lift Me Up"	November 12, 2022
2	Quavo	"No Brainer" (DJ Khaled featuring Justin Bieber, Chance the Rapper and Quavo)	August 11, 2018
2	Quavo	"Intentions" (Justin Bieber featuring Quavo)	February 22, 2020

=== Artists with most weeks at number one on the chart ===
Weeks	Artist	Ref.
133	The Weeknd	
100	Bruno Mars	
68	Drake	
65	SZA	
55	Rihanna	
44	Khalid	
32	Justin Bieber	
32	Pharrell Williams	
29	Wizkid	
27	Ella Mai	

=== Most top ten hits ===
Number of singles	Artist	Ref.
66	Drake	
55	Chris Brown	
54	The Weeknd	
36	SZA	
32	Beyoncé	
27	Summer Walker	
22	Khalid	
21	Bryson Tiller	
19	Justin Bieber	
17	Rihanna	

=== Most chart entries ===
Entries	Artist	Source
112	Chris Brown	
88	Drake	
86	The Weeknd	
69	Summer Walker	
62	Bryson Tiller	
60	Kehlani	
60	Beyoncé	
60	SZA	
56	Jhené Aiko	
50	Khalid	

== Album achievements ==
=== Most number-one songs from one album ===
Number	Artist	Album	Year
3	The Weeknd	Beauty Behind the Madness	2015
3	SZA	SOS	2022
2	Rihanna	Anti	2016
2	Bruno Mars	24K Magic	2016
2	Justin Bieber	Changes	2020
2	The Weeknd	After Hours	2020
2	Silk Sonic	An Evening with Silk Sonic	2021
2	Doja Cat	Planet Her	2021

=== Most top ten songs from one album ===
Number	Artist	Album	Year
10	SZA	SOS	2022
9	The Weeknd	Beauty Behind the Madness	2015
8	The Weeknd	Starboy	2016
8	The Weeknd	After Hours	2020
8	Drake	Honestly, Nevermind	2022
8	Beyoncé	Renaissance	2022
7	Drake	Scorpion	2018
7	Khalid	Free Spirit	2019
7	Summer Walker	Over It	2019
7	Summer Walker	Still Over It	2021
6	The Weeknd	Dawn FM	2022
6	Justin Bieber	Swag	2025
5	Beyoncé	BEYONCÉ	2013
5	Rihanna	Anti	2016
5	Drake	More Life	2017
5	The Weeknd	My Dear Melancholy	2019
5	Bryson Tiller	Anniversary	2020

== Selected additional R&B Songs chart achievements ==
- Khalid is the first and only artist to occupy the entire top 5 of the R&B Songs chart. He achieved this on the chart dated April 20, 2019 with the songs "Better" and "Talk" staying steady at positions 1 and 2, respectively, while "My Bad" and "Saturday Nights" climbed up to numbers 3 and 4, and "Outta My Head" entered the chart at number 5.
- Khalid, The Weeknd, and Drake all hold the record for charting the most songs within the top 10 simultaneously – eight songs. Summer Walker holds the female record, with six, on the October 19, 2019 chart.
