= TSU (song) =

2021 song by Drake

Song by Drake

from the album Certified Lover Boy
- Released: September 3, 2021
- Genre: Pop rap • R&B
- Length: 5:08
- Label: Republic; OVO
- Songwriters: Aubrey Graham; Harley Arsenault; Noel Cadastre; Christopher Cross; Robert Kelly; Justin Timberlake; Timothy Mosley; Floyd Hills
- Producer: Arsenault

"TSU" is a song by Canadian rapper and singer Drake released on September 3, 2021, as the eighth track from Drake's sixth studio album Certified Lover Boy.

== Background and controversy ==
The sample of R. Kelly, who was on trial for sexual trafficking and racketeering at the time of the song's release, drew controversy. The Drake producer 40 claimed he was "forced to license" the song because the voice recording of OG Ron C played in the intro had "Half on a Baby" playing faintly in the background.

== Charts ==
=== Weekly charts ===
Chart performance for "TSU"
Chart (2021)	Peak position
Australia (ARIA)	16
Australia Hip-Hop/R&B Singles (ARIA)	12
Canada Hot 100 (Billboard)	7
Denmark (Tracklisten)	38
France (SNEP)	47
Global 200 (Billboard)	11
Greece International (IFPI)	32
Iceland (Tónlistinn)	31
Lithuania (AGATA)	41
Portugal (AFP)	30
Slovakia (Singles Digitál Top 100)	83
South Africa (TOSAC)	8
Sweden (Sverigetopplistan)	76
UK Audio Streaming (OCC)	13
US Billboard Hot 100	9
US Hot R&B/Hip-Hop Songs (Billboard)	8

=== Year-end charts ===
Year-end chart performance for "TSU"
Chart (2021)	Position
US Hot R&B/Hip-Hop Songs (Billboard)	91

== Certifications ==
Certifications for "TSU"
Region	Certification	Certified units/sales
Australia (ARIA)	Gold	35,000^{‡}
United Kingdom (BPI)	Silver	200,000^{‡}
^{‡} Sales+streaming figures based on certification alone.
