= Jillette Johnson =

American singer-songwriter

- Born: June 3, 1989 (age 37); California, U.S.
- Origin: Pound Ridge, New York, U.S.
- Genres: Pop, piano rock, indie, folk
- Occupations: Singer-songwriter, musician
- Instrument: Piano
- Years active: 2012–present
- Labels: Wind-Up, Rounder
- Website: jillettejohnson.com

Jillette Johnson (born June 3, 1989) is an American singer-songwriter and musician from New York.

Her debut album, Water in a Whale, was released on June 25, 2013, by Wind-Up Records and earned her comparisons to the likes of artists such as Fiona Apple and Adele. Johnson then released her Dave Cobb-produced second record, All I Ever See in You Is Me, via Rounder Records in 2017. Johnson currently resides in Nashville, Tennessee, and released her first album in three years, It's a Beautiful Day and I Love You, on February 12, 2021. In March, 2026 she released The Pain, My Friend, a 5-song EP.

== Early life ==
Jillette got an early start in music, learning to play piano by the age of five, and beginning to write her own music by age eight. By the age of 12, she had begun playing three hour sets of original music at a restaurant near her home, and soon after, clubs in the New York City area like The Bitter End and Tin Angel.

== Career ==
=== Whiskey & Frosting and Water in a Whale ===
Jillette moved to Manhattan full time at the age of 18 to continue to pursue a career in music and attend New York University. She released her debut EP, Whiskey & Frosting, on August 14, 2012, on Wind-up Records. The EP contains five tracks that were written by Jillette in her apartment over the previous year, and she claims that the track "When The Ship Goes Down" is the best track she has ever written.

Her debut album with Wind-up, Water in a Whale, was released June 25, 2013. It led to her television debuts on The Rachael Ray Show and VH1 Big Morning Buzz. The album consists of the five tracks from the preview EP plus eight new tracks and a new version of "Cameron". It was produced by Peter Zizzo and Michael Mangini. In support of the record, she toured the US extensively, appearing at major festivals such as Bonnaroo and Firefly, as well as a support act for artists such as Mary Lambert, Delta Rae, OAR, and Marc Broussard.

The song "Cameron", about a young transgender boy, became one of Jillette's most beloved songs, which was inspired by a real life Cameron she knew and loved. Chicago's Go Pride called it "one of the most powerful statements by a straight performer to the LGBT community since Patty Griffin's 'Tony'".

=== All I Ever See in You Is Me ===
After many years in New York City, Johnson moved to Los Angeles briefly before permanently making her way to Nashville. She released her sophomore album All I Ever See in You Is Me on July 28, 2017, through Rounder Records. The album marked a sonic departure from her first album, eschewing grand production in favor of sparse, live band instrumentation that highlighted her classic songwriting roots and vocal command. Produced by Dave Cobb at RCA Studio A in Nashville, it was met with widespread critical acclaim from Billboard, Paste, Marie Claire, ELLE and AllMusic who rated it 9/10 stars and touted its "emotionally rich feast of countrypolitan-tinged confessionals that find the sweet spot between balmy '70s FM pop and agile and arty 21st century indie Americana." Johnson embarked on a headline tour and also supported artists such as Penny & Sparrow and Parker Millsap.

=== It's a Beautiful Day and I Love You ===
In the four years since relocating to Nashville after making All I Ever See in You Is Me, Johnson said she made friends easily in the new city and also met and married her husband. The new relationships, both personal and professional, brought with them a renewed creative confidence, which resulted in Johnson's third studio album, It's a Beautiful Day and I Love You. Released on February 12, 2021, it was recorded in East Nashville and was produced by Joe Pisapia, engineered by Dan Knobler, and features bassist Owen Biddle and drummer Jamie Dick. It has already garnered praise from Rolling Stone, American Songwriter, CMT, and Refinery29. American Songwriter called Johnson a rare gem in Nashville, having written the entirety of the album alone, running contrary to the common Music City practice of co-writing. British music monthly Uncut also commented, "Following the ostentatious piano pop of 2013's Water in a Whale and the austere Nashville twang of 2017's All I Ever See in You Is Me, her latest uses country as a springboard into '60s pop, '70s rock, and Noughties indie. It's an adventurous palette that suits her well."

== Discography ==
=== Studio albums ===
- Water in a Whale (June 25, 2013)
- All I Ever See in You Is Me (July 28, 2017)
- It's a Beautiful Day and I Love You (February 12, 2021)

=== EPs ===
- Whiskey & Frosting (August 12, 2012)
- Normal Kid (June 15, 2022)
- The Pain, My Friend (March 6, 2026)

=== Singles ===
- "River" (November 17, 2014)
- "I'll Be Home For Christmas" (November 17, 2014)
- "I Shouldn't Go Anywhere" (August 6, 2020)
- "Cancel Christmas" (December 17, 2020)
- "I Shouldn't Go Anywhere (Stripped)" (April 29, 2021)
- "Daddy Dopamine" (September 15, 2021)
- "Honest" (October 27, 2022)
- "Bon Adventure" (December 2, 2022)
- "Success" (July 20, 2023)
- "Dull Thud" (August 16, 2023)
- "Deep Fake" with Molly Parden (September 19, 2024)
- "Love Island" (November 6, 2025)
- "Hard Candy Christmas" with Lera Lynn (November 28, 2025)
