= Where Have You Gone =

Studio album by Alan Jackson
- Released: May 14, 2021
- Genre: Country
- Length: 82:52
- Label: ACR/EMI Nashville
- Producer: Keith Stegall

Alan Jackson chronology
Angels and Alcohol (2015)	Where Have You Gone (2021)

Singles from Where Have You Gone
- 1. "The Older I Get" Released: October 2017; 2. "Where Have You Gone" Released: April 2021; 3. "You'll Always Be My Baby" Released: August 16, 2021

Where Have You Gone is the twenty-first studio album by American country artist Alan Jackson, released on May 14, 2021, through ACR/EMI.

== Content ==
Where Have You Gone is Jackson's first new studio album since Angels and Alcohol in 2015. Jackson wrote 15 of the songs on the album. It was produced by Keith Stegall, who has produced every studio album of Jackson's except for Like Red on a Rose (2006). Many of the studio musicians are ones who have played on his previous albums, including guitarist J. T. Corenflos, fiddler Stuart Duncan, drummer Eddie Bayers, and steel guitarist Paul Franklin. Three songs were released in advance: "The Older I Get" was a single in 2017 prior to the album's release. Also released were the title track, in which Jackson comments on the contemporary state of the country music genre, and "You'll Always Be My Baby", a song that he wrote with the intention of having listeners play at weddings. Also included on the vinyl version of the album is a cover of the Lefty Frizzell-Sanger D. Shafer composition "That's the Way Love Goes", which has been a hit single for both Johnny Rodriguez and Merle Haggard.

== Critical reception ==
Rating it 4 out of 5 stars, Stephen Thomas Erlewine of AllMusic wrote that "Jackson knows himself so well as a singer and songwriter that he doesn't shy from his strengths, he writes songs to showcase his smooth, supple voice and love of old-fashioned country. The simplicity of his goals means Where Have You Gone might seem a bit modest even at its oversized length, but that's also its charm."

== Track listing ==
All songs written by Alan Jackson, except where noted.

1. "Where Have You Gone" – 4:47
2. "Wishful Drinkin'" – 3:50
3. "I Can Be That Something" – 4:40
4. "Where the Cottonwood Grows" – 3:01
5. "Way Down in My Whiskey" – 3:56
6. "Things That Matter" (Keith Stegall, Michael White) – 3:42
7. "Livin' on Empty" – 4:31
8. "You'll Always Be My Baby" (Written For Daughters' Weddings) – 3:46
9. "Where Her Heart Has Always Been" – 3:27
10. "The Boot" (Adam Wright) – 3:24
11. "Back" – 5:13
12. "Write It in Red" – 4:15
13. "So Late So Soon" (Scotty Emerick, Daniel Tashian, Sarah Buxton) – 3:46
14. "This Heart of Mine" (Wright) – 3:18
15. "A Man Who Never Cries" – 4:55
16. "Chain" – 3:06
17. "I Was Tequila" – 5:10
18. "I Do" (Written For Daughters' Weddings) — 2:51
19. "Beer:10" – 4:18
20. "The Older I Get" (Hailey Whitters, Wright, Sarah Turner) – 3:49

== Personnel ==
Adapted from liner notes.

- Roy Agee – trombone, gang vocals (track 20)
- Eddie Bayers – drums
- Vinnie Ciesielski – trumpet, gang vocals (track 20)
- J.T. Corenflos – electric guitar
- Stuart Duncan – fiddle, mandolin
- Robbie Flint – Dobro
- Paul Franklin – steel guitar
- Brad Guin – saxophone, gang vocals (track 20)
- Tania Hancheroff – background vocals, gang vocals (track 20)
- Travis Humbert – gang vocals (track 20)
- John Kelton – bass guitar, gang vocals (track 20)
- Brent Mason – acoustic guitar, electric guitar, gut string guitar
- Rob McNelley – electric guitar
- Alecia Nugent – background vocals
- Dave Pomeroy – bass guitar
- Gary Prim – Hammond B-3 organ, keyboards, piano, Wurlitzer electric piano
- John Wesley Ryles – background vocals, gang vocals (track 20)
- Scotty Sanders – Dobro, steel guitar
- Sammy Shelor – banjo
- Keith Stegall – gut string guitar, Hammond B-3 organ, hand drums, piano, gang vocals (track 20)
- Bruce Watkins – acoustic guitar
- Glenn Worf – bass guitar

== Charts ==
=== Weekly charts ===
Weekly chart performance for Where Have You Gone
Chart (2021)	Peak position
Australian Albums (ARIA)	14
Austrian Albums (Ö3 Austria)	68
Belgian Albums (Ultratop Flanders)	70
Canadian Albums (Billboard)	33
German Albums (Offizielle Top 100)	44
Scottish Albums (OCC)	19
Swiss Albums (Schweizer Hitparade)	16
UK Country Albums (OCC)	1
US Billboard 200	9
US Top Country Albums (Billboard)	2

=== Year-end charts ===
Year-end chart performance for Where Have You Gone
Chart (2021)	Position
Australian Country Albums (ARIA)	15
US Top Country Albums (Billboard)	78
