= Papi's Home =

2021 song by Drake

Song by Drake

from the album Certified Lover Boy
- Released: September 3, 2021
- Length: 2:58
- Label: Republic; OVO
- Songwriters: Aubrey Graham; Raynford Humphrey; Jonathan Priester; Jarrel Young; Mark Borino; Oriyomi Ojelade; Montell Jordan; Anthony Crawford; Onika Maraj
- Producers: Jarrel the Young; Supah Mario; Skip2Fame; Young; Borino; Preme

"Papi's Home" is a song by Canadian rapper Drake. It is the second track from Drake's sixth studio album Certified Lover Boy, released in 2021. The song features uncredited vocals from Drake's former Young Money labelmate Nicki Minaj.

== Charts ==
Chart performance for "Papi's Home"
Chart (2021)	Peak position
Australia (ARIA)	8
Australia Hip-Hop/R&B Singles (ARIA)	6
Canada Hot 100 (Billboard)	23
Denmark (Tracklisten)	24
France (SNEP)	30
Global 200 (Billboard)	8
Greece (IFPI)	35
Iceland (Tónlistinn)	27
Italy (FIMI)	76
Lithuania (AGATA)	30
Norway (VG-lista)	34
Portugal (AFP)	24
Slovakia (Singles Digitál Top 100)	61
South Africa (TOSAC)	5
Sweden (Sverigetopplistan)	56
UK Audio Streaming (OCC)	10
US Billboard Hot 100	8
US Hot R&B/Hip-Hop Songs (Billboard)	7

== Certifications ==
Certifications for "Papi's Home"
Region	Certification	Certified units/sales
Australia (ARIA)	Gold	35,000^{‡}
^{‡} Sales+streaming figures based on certification alone.
