= Race My Mind =

2021 song by Drake

Song by Drake

from the album Certified Lover Boy
- Released: September 3, 2021
- Genre: R&B
- Length: 4:29
- Label: Republic; OVO
- Songwriters: Aubrey Graham; Noah Shebib; Scott Zhang; Nile Goveia; Christopher Wallace; Osten Harvey; David Axelrod; Michael Axelrod; Herman Blount (Sun Ra); James Johnson Jr.
- Producers: 40; Monsune; Govi

"Race My Mind" is a song by Canadian rapper Drake. Released on September 3, 2021, as the fifteenth track from Drake's sixth studio album Certified Lover Boy.

== Composition ==
"Race My Mind" contains samples of "Dead Wrong", written by Christopher Wallace and Osten Harvey, as performed by The Notorious B.I.G., as well as samples of Sun Ra's recording and composition "Rumpelstiltskin" and "The Signs Part IV" by David Axelrod. It also interpolates lyrics from "Give It to Me Baby" by Rick James.

== Charts ==
Chart performance for "Race My Mind"
| Chart (2021) | Peak position |
|---|---|
| Australia (ARIA) | 29 |
| Australia Hip-Hop/R&B Singles (ARIA) | 21 |
| Canada Hot 100 (Billboard) | 12 |
| France (SNEP) | 111 |
| Global 200 (Billboard) | 17 |
| Greece International (IFPI) | 66 |
| Lithuania (AGATA) | 95 |
| Portugal (AFP) | 55 |
| South Africa (TOSAC) | 16 |
| Sweden (Sverigetopplistan) | 69 |
| UK Audio Streaming (OCC) | 30 |
| US Billboard Hot 100 | 18 |
| US Hot R&B/Hip-Hop Songs (Billboard) | 14 |

=== Year-end charts ===
Year-end chart performance for "Race My Mind"
| Chart (2021) | Position |
|---|---|
| US Hot R&B Songs (Billboard) | 31 |
