= Champagne Poetry =

2021 song by Drake

Song by Drake

from the album Certified Lover Boy
- Released: September 3, 2021
- Genre: Chipmunk soul
- Length: 5:36
- Label: Republic; OVO
- Songwriters: Aubrey Graham; Noah Shebib; Micah Davis; Maneesh Bidaye; Jean-Andre Lawrence; John Lennon; Paul McCartney; Gabriel Hardeman, Jr.
- Producers: 40; J.L.L.; Masego; Maneesh

"Champagne Poetry" is a song by Canadian rapper Drake. Released on September 3, 2021, as the first track from Drake's sixth studio album Certified Lover Boy.

The songs intro was received well by critics and remixed by other artists such as Lupe Fiasco, Freddie Gibbs, IDK.

== Sampling ==
The song's main sample comes from "Navajo", a song performed by Jamaican-American artist Masego. Masego is credited as a producer on the track. Masego's song samples The Singers Unlimited's cover of "Michelle" by The Beatles. The main sample, the phrase "I love you, I love you, I love you" is a musical and lyrical quote taken originally from "Michelle". Respectively, Drake credits the Lennon-McCartney songwriting partnership on the track.

== Charts ==
=== Weekly charts ===
Chart performance for "Champagne Poetry"
| Chart (2021) | Peak position |
|---|---|
| Australia (ARIA) | 6 |
| Australia Hip-Hop/R&B Singles (ARIA) | 4 |
| Canada Hot 100 (Billboard) | 3 |
| Czech Republic Singles Digital (ČNS IFPI) | 86 |
| Denmark (Tracklisten) | 18 |
| France (SNEP) | 22 |
| Global 200 (Billboard) | 5 |
| Greece International (IFPI) | 19 |
| Iceland (Tónlistinn) | 20 |
| Ireland (IRMA) | 6 |
| Italy (FIMI) | 61 |
| Lithuania (AGATA) | 20 |
| Netherlands (Single Top 100) | 20 |
| New Zealand (Recorded Music NZ) | 4 |
| Norway (VG-lista) | 21 |
| Portugal (AFP) | 17 |
| Slovakia (Singles Digitál Top 100) | 41 |
| South Africa (TOSAC) | 3 |
| Sweden (Sverigetopplistan) | 32 |
| UK Singles (OCC) | 5 |
| UK Hip Hop/R&B (OCC) | 3 |
| US Billboard Hot 100 | 4 |
| US Hot R&B/Hip-Hop Songs (Billboard) | 4 |

=== Year-end charts ===
Year-end chart performance for "Champagne Poetry"
| Chart (2021) | Position |
|---|---|
| US Hot R&B/Hip-Hop Songs (Billboard) | 68 |

== Certifications ==
| Region | Certification | Certified units/sales |
|---|---|---|
| Australia (ARIA) | Platinum | 70,000^{‡} |
| New Zealand (RMNZ) | Platinum | 30,000^{‡} |
| United Kingdom (BPI) | Silver | 200,000^{‡} |
^{‡} Sales+streaming figures based on certification alone.
