= N 2 Deep =

2021 song by Drake

Song by Drake featuring Future

from the album Certified Lover Boy
- Released: September 3, 2021
- Recorded: 2020
- Genre: R&B; trap
- Length: 4:33
- Label: Republic; OVO
- Songwriters: Aubrey Graham; Nayvadius Wilburn; Harley Arsenault; Kaushik Barua; Noah Shebib; Alexander Lustig; Noel Cadastre; Bernard Freeman; Chad Butler; Joseph McVey IV; Jay Jenkins; Shawn Carter; Leroy Williams, Jr.
- Producers: Arsenault; Kid Masterpiece

"N 2 Deep" is a song by Canadian rapper Drake featuring American rapper Future. It was released on September 3, 2021 as the eighth track from Drake's sixth studio album Certified Lover Boy. The song sampled the song Get Throwed produced by producer Leroy Williams, Jr.

== Charts ==
=== Weekly charts ===
Chart performance for "N 2 Deep"
Chart (2021)	Peak position
Australia (ARIA)	19
Australia Hip-Hop/R&B Singles (ARIA)	14
Canada Hot 100 (Billboard)	24
France (SNEP)	58
Global 200 (Billboard)	14
Greece International (IFPI)	46
Lithuania (AGATA)	64
Portugal (AFP)	39
Slovakia (Singles Digitál Top 100)	90
South Africa (TOSAC)	11
Sweden Heatseeker (Sverigetopplistan)	1
UK Audio Streaming (OCC)	16
US Billboard Hot 100	12
US Hot R&B/Hip-Hop Songs (Billboard)	11

=== Year-end charts ===
Year-end chart performance for "N 2 Deep"
Chart (2021)	Position
US Hot R&B/Hip-Hop Songs (Billboard)	97
