= Wants and Needs =

2021 song by Drake featuring Lil Baby

Song by Drake featuring Lil Baby

from the EP Scary Hours 2
- Released: March 5, 2021
- Genre: Trap
- Length: 3:14
- Label: Republic; OVO
- Songwriters: Aubrey Graham; Dominique Jones; Ronald LaTour Jr.; Dylan Cleary-Krell; Noah Shebib
- Producers: Cardo; Dez Wright; 40

"Wants and Needs" is a song by Canadian rapper Drake featuring American rapper Lil Baby. It was released as the second out of three tracks from the former's fourth extended play, Scary Hours 2, through Republic Records and OVO Sound, on March 5, 2021. The artists wrote the song alongside producers Cardo, Dez Wright, and 40. The song debuted at number 2 on the Billboard Hot 100, making it Lil Baby's highest-charting single on the chart, eventually becoming tied with "Girls Want Girls", another collaboration with Drake, and "Do We Have a Problem?", with Nicki Minaj.

== Background ==
The song serves as the fourth collaboration between Drake and Lil Baby, following 2018's collaborative singles "Yes Indeed" and "Never Recover", the latter alongside Gunna, plus the two artists' features alongside DaBaby on the remix of Future's 2020 single "Life Is Good", in which Drake is also featured on the original version.

It also received attention due to speculations that Drake slept with American model and media personality Kim Kardashian, the wife of American rapper Kanye West. Drake and West's feud has been dating back to multiple issues starting from around 2010.

== Critical reception ==
Jordan Rose of Variety felt that "Lil Baby steals the show" with "Drake taking a back seat after delivering a verse with a purposefully offbeat flow as Lil Baby takes over in the second act and absolutely bodies his guest appearance" and the song "was just a Lil Baby exposition, with the Atlanta rapper proving that he still has plenty in the tank after scorching 2020".

== Personnel ==
Credits adapted from Tidal.

- Drake – lead vocals, songwriting
- Lil Baby – featured vocals, songwriting
- Cardo – production, songwriting
- Dez Wright – production, songwriting
- 40 – production, songwriting, mixing, studio personnel
- Noel Cadastre – recording, studio personnel

== Charts ==
=== Weekly charts ===
Weekly chart performance for "Wants and Needs"
Chart (2021)	Peak position
Australia (ARIA)	15
Austria (Ö3 Austria Top 40)	38
Canada Hot 100 (Billboard)	2
France (SNEP)	115
Germany (GfK)	58
Global 200 (Billboard)	2
Iceland (Tónlistinn)	21
Ireland (IRMA)	8
Lithuania (AGATA)	28
Netherlands (Single Top 100)	52
New Zealand (Recorded Music NZ)	20
Portugal (AFP)	31
South Africa (RISA)	3
Sweden (Sverigetopplistan)	77
Switzerland (Schweizer Hitparade)	24
UK Singles (Official Charts)	10
UK Hip Hop/R&B (Official Charts)	5
US Billboard Hot 100	2
US Hot R&B/Hip-Hop Songs (Billboard)	2
US Rhythmic Airplay (Billboard)	32

=== Year-end charts ===
Year-end chart performance for "Wants and Needs"
Chart (2021)	Position
Canada (Canadian Hot 100)	46
Global 200 (Billboard)	77
US Billboard Hot 100	47
US Hot R&B/Hip-Hop Songs (Billboard)	13

== Certifications ==
Certifications for "Wants and Needs"
Region	Certification	Certified units/sales
Australia (ARIA)	2× Platinum	140,000^{‡}
Denmark (IFPI Danmark)	Gold	45,000^{‡}
Italy (FIMI)	Gold	50,000^{‡}
Portugal (AFP)	Gold	5,000^{‡}
United Kingdom (BPI)	Gold	400,000^{‡}
United States (RIAA)	5× Platinum	5,000,000^{‡}
^{‡} Sales+streaming figures based on certification alone.
