= Girls Want Girls =

2021 song by Drake featuring Lil Baby

Single by Drake featuring Lil Baby

from the album Certified Lover Boy
- Released: September 28, 2021
- Recorded: 2020–2021
- Genre: R&B; trap
- Length: 3:41
- Label: Republic; OVO
- Songwriters: Aubrey Graham; Dominique Jones; Ozan Yildirim; Mathias Liyew
- Producers: Oz; Ambezza

Drake singles chronology
"Way 2 Sexy" (2021)	"Girls Want Girls" (2021)	"Bubbly" (2021)

Lil Baby singles chronology
"Hurricane" (2021)	"Girls Want Girls" (2021)	"Silence" (2021)

"Girls Want Girls" is a song by Canadian rapper Drake featuring American rapper Lil Baby. It is the third track on the former's sixth studio album Certified Lover Boy, released on September 3, 2021, and sent to rhythmic contemporary radio on September 28, 2021, as the album's second official single.

The R&B and trap song, written alongside producers Oz and Ambezza, is about the artists being attracted to lesbians. It received mixed reviews, with critics praising it as catchy but criticizing the lyrics as confusing and fetishistic. Criticisms were also levelled against lyrics about Drake being a lesbian himself, which critics considered immature. It peaked at number two on the UK Singles Chart, the ARIA Singles Chart, and the Billboard Hot 100, matching "Wants and Needs", another Drake collaboration, as well as "Do We Have a Problem?" with Nicki Minaj, as Baby's highest charting song on the latter chart.

== Composition ==
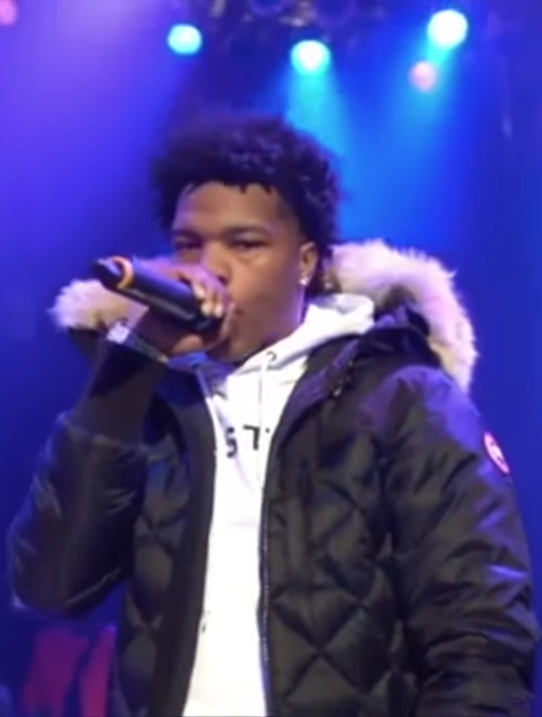
"Girls Want Girls" features vocals from American rapper Lil Baby.

"Girls Want Girls" is a downtempo, melodic R&B and trap song which contains interpolations of Drake's song "Time Flies". It was produced by Oz and Ambezza and features vocals from Lil Baby. It is the fifth collaboration between Drake and Lil Baby, after "Yes Indeed", "Never Recover", "Wants and Needs", and the remix of Future's "Life Is Good" also featuring DaBaby. On the song, Drake raps about being attracted to lesbians, and about attempting to seduce a homosexual woman by claiming that he is also a lesbian, rapping, "Yeah, say that you a lesbian, girl, me too". The Guardian's Alim Kheraj wrote that the song was "either about a night out picking up women with a lesbian friend or...[the] insinuation that [Drake] could 'turn' a queer woman".

== Reception ==
Variety included the song in their list of the worst songs of 2021. Pitchfork's Matthew Strauss called "Girls Want Girls" a "pleasant, classic Drake moment", while Brandon Yu of Variety described it as "infectiously moody". Billboard's Carl Lamarre ranked the song eighth out of the 21 songs on Certified Lover Boy, calling it a "catchy earworm" and an "instant classic" with a "sticky hook", also complimenting Lil Baby's "frenzied delivery". The A.V. Club's Nina Hernandez opined that the song "has everything you need in a next-gen pop hit" and praised the song for its "catchy" hook, Lil Baby's "effortless" verse, and its appreciation of lesbians. William Rosebury of The Line of Best Fit wrote that "Girls Want Girls" was one of several songs on Certified Lover Boy that followed the "classic Drake formula" of having "nocturnal and soulful" production and "melodic", "stream-of-consciousness" lyrics, which had "countless quotables and yet little to no depth".

Jon Caramanica of The New York Times described "Girls Want Girls" as "silly", while Clash's Nathan Evans called the song a "dud" that "welcome[s] in the familiar malaise of a Drake project", adding that Lil Baby's verse takes the song's concept "well beyond its limit". The Guardian's Alim Kheraj called the song "confusing and meandering", while Slant Magazine's Charles Lyons-Burt described it as "nonsensical". Josh Milton of PinkNews wrote that the song was proof that "straight men never know where to draw the line". For the Financial Times, Ludovic Hunter-Tilney wrote that "Drake's sexism becomes ludicrous" on the song; Time's Cady Lang identified "Girls Want Girls" as "the most overt instance" of Drake's "no-longer-so subtle misogyny", adding that he fetishizes lesbians on the song. Craig Jenkins of Vulture stated that Drake "serves reheated lesbian jokes" on the song.

Much of the criticism toward the song was levelled against a lyric in which Drake raps about being a lesbian. Sam Moore of The Independent wrote that the lyric was the worst punchline on the album, calling it "rote" and "so grating even Eminem would balk at [it]", adding that it fetishized bisexuality. Elamin Abdelmahmoud of BuzzFeed News wrote that the line was "god-awful" and delivered with "the charm of a middle-aged dad in the club". Writing for NME, Rhian Daly described it as "cringe-y as fuck" and "the kind of thing kids think is smart when they've just hit puberty", adding that it was "just tragic" coming from a 34-year-old man. Pitchfork's Matthew Strauss also wrote that Drake rapped the line "like the cleverest little boy at sleepaway camp", with Ludovic Hunter-Tilney deeming the line an "absurd claim". Jon Caramanica remarked that the "deep-sigh" line was aimed at "those in search of a cheap wink". Charles Holmes of The Ringer called it a "cringe pickup line that no cisgendered man has ever sold throughout recorded history". Listeners also expressed their confusion about the lyric on social media.

== Commercial performance ==
"Girls Want Girls" debuted at number two on the Billboard Hot 100, earning 57.4 million streams and 1.5 million in airplay audience and selling 3,000 copies in its first week. The song matches "Wants and Needs", another Drake and Lil Baby collaboration, as the latter's highest-charting song. In its second week on the chart, it fell eight spots to number 10. The song also peaked at number two in the UK and in Australia, and at number three on the Billboard Global 200 chart.

== Charts ==
=== Weekly charts ===
Chart performance for "Girls Want Girls"
Chart (2021)	Peak position
Australia (ARIA)	2
Australia Hip-Hop/R&B Singles (ARIA)	2
Austria (Ö3 Austria Top 40)	17
Belgium (Ultratop 50 Flanders)	49
Belgium (Ultratop 50 Wallonia)	48
Canada Hot 100 (Billboard)	8
Czech Republic Singles Digital (ČNS IFPI)	28
Denmark (Tracklisten)	4
France (SNEP)	12
Germany (GfK)	94
Global 200 (Billboard)	3
Greece International (IFPI)	8
Hungary (Stream Top 40)	22
Iceland (Tónlistinn)	9
India International Singles (IMI)	11
Ireland (IRMA)	3
Italy (FIMI)	33
Lithuania (AGATA)	10
Netherlands (Single Top 100)	11
New Zealand (Recorded Music NZ)	2
Norway (VG-lista)	11
Portugal (AFP)	7
Singapore (RIAS)	17
Slovakia (Singles Digitál Top 100)	22
South Africa (TOSAC)	2
Spain (Promusicae)	89
Sweden (Sverigetopplistan)	11
Switzerland (Schweizer Hitparade)	8
UK Singles (Official Charts)	2
UK Hip Hop/R&B (Official Charts)	1
US Billboard Hot 100	2
US Hot R&B/Hip-Hop Songs (Billboard)	2
US Rhythmic Airplay (Billboard)	2

=== Year-end charts ===
2021 year-end chart performance for "Girls Want Girls"
Chart (2021)	Position
Global 200 (Billboard)	170
US Hot R&B/Hip-Hop Songs (Billboard)	40

2022 year-end chart performance for "Girls Want Girls"
Chart (2022)	Position
US Hot R&B/Hip-Hop Songs (Billboard)	24
US Rhythmic (Billboard)	32

== Certifications ==
Certifications for "Girls Want Girls"
Region	Certification	Certified units/sales
Australia (ARIA)	2× Platinum	140,000^{‡}
Brazil (Pro-Música Brasil)	Gold	20,000^{‡}
Denmark (IFPI Danmark)	Gold	45,000^{‡}
France (SNEP)	Gold	100,000^{‡}
New Zealand (RMNZ)	Platinum	30,000^{‡}
United Kingdom (BPI)	Platinum	600,000^{‡}
^{‡} Sales+streaming figures based on certification alone.

== Release history ==
Region	Date	Format	Label	Ref.
United States	September 28, 2021	Rhythmic contemporary radio	OVO; Republic	

== See also ==
- Fetishization of LGBTQ people
