= Knife Talk =

2021 song by Drake featuring 21 Savage and Project Pat

Single by Drake featuring 21 Savage and Project Pat

from the album Certified Lover Boy
- Released: November 16, 2021
- Recorded: 2020 (21 Savage verse); September 2, 2021 (Drake Verse)
- Genre: Horrorcore; trap
- Length: 4:02
- Label: OVO; Republic
- Songwriters: Aubrey Graham; Shéyaa Abraham-Joseph; Patrick Houston; Leland Wayne; Peter Lee Johnson; Jordan Houston; Rakim Mayers; Robert Mandell; Jerami Davis
- Producers: Metro Boomin; Johnson

Drake and 21 Savage singles chronology
"Mr. Right Now" (2020)	"Knife Talk" (2021)	"Jimmy Cooks" (2022)

Drake singles chronology
"Bubbly" (2021)	"Knife Talk" (2021)	"Wait for U" (2022)

21 Savage singles chronology
"Outlawz" (2021)	"Knife Talk" (2021)	"Surround Sound" (2022)

Project Pat singles chronology
"Egoísta" (2021)	"Knife Talk" (2021)	"Carolina Blue" (2021)

Music video
- "Knife Talk" on YouTube

"Knife Talk" is a song by Canadian rapper Drake featuring Atlanta-based rapper 21 Savage and American rapper Project Pat. It was released on November 16, 2021, as the third single from Drake's sixth studio album Certified Lover Boy. The song was produced by Metro Boomin and Peter Lee Johnson.

== Background ==
The song was originally planned to appear on 21 Savage and Metro Boomin's collaboration album Savage Mode II. The official music video was released on November 4, 2021.

== Composition ==
"Knife Talk" samples a part of Project Pat's verse from "Feed the Streets", written by Juicy J, Project Pat, A$AP Rocky, and Metro Boomin, as performed by the former three from the album, Rubba Band Business. Like this song, it was co-produced by the latter.

== Charts ==
=== Weekly charts ===
Chart performance for "Knife Talk"
Chart (2021–2022)	Peak position
Australia (ARIA)	13
Australia Hip-Hop/R&B Singles (ARIA)	10
Canada Hot 100 (Billboard)	6
France (SNEP)	83
Global 200 (Billboard)	6
Greece International (IFPI)	16
Iceland (Tónlistinn)	21
Ireland (IRMA)	55
Italy (FIMI)	100
Lithuania (AGATA)	29
New Zealand (Recorded Music NZ)	14
Norway (VG-lista)	38
Portugal (AFP)	48
Slovakia (Singles Digitál Top 100)	55
South Africa (TOSAC)	13
Sweden (Sverigetopplistan)	74
UK Singles (Official Charts)	87
UK Hip Hop/R&B (Official Charts)	38
US Billboard Hot 100	4
US Hot R&B/Hip-Hop Songs (Billboard)	2
US Rhythmic Airplay (Billboard)	6

=== Year-end charts ===
2021 year-end chart performance for "Knife Talk"
Chart (2021)	Position
Canada (Canadian Hot 100)	74
Global 200 (Billboard)	168
US Billboard Hot 100	86
US Hot R&B/Hip-Hop Songs (Billboard)	37

2022 year-end chart performance for "Knife Talk"
Chart (2022)	Position
Global 200 (Billboard)	136
US Billboard Hot 100	60
US Hot R&B/Hip-Hop Songs (Billboard)	17
US Rhythmic (Billboard)	30

== Certifications ==
Certifications for "Knife Talk"
Region	Certification	Certified units/sales
Australia (ARIA)	2× Platinum	140,000^{‡}
Denmark (IFPI Danmark)	Gold	45,000^{‡}
New Zealand (RMNZ)	2× Platinum	60,000^{‡}
Poland (ZPAV)	Gold	25,000^{‡}
United Kingdom (BPI)	Gold	400,000^{‡}
United States (RIAA)	5× Platinum	5,000,000^{‡}
^{‡} Sales+streaming figures based on certification alone.
