= No Friends in the Industry =

2021 song by Drake

Song by Drake

from the album Certified Lover Boy
- Released: September 3, 2021
- Genre: Hip hop; crunk
- Length: 3:24
- Label: Republic; OVO
- Songwriters: Aubrey Graham; Anderson Hernandez; Ozan Yildirim; Nicolas Frascona; Robert DeBarge, Jr.; Gregory Williams
- Producers: Vinylz; OZ; Nik D

"No Friends in the Industry" is a song by Canadian rapper Drake. Released on September 3, 2021, as the twelfth track from Drake's sixth studio album Certified Lover Boy.

== Charts ==
=== Weekly charts ===
Chart performance for "No Friends in the Industry"
Chart (2021)	Peak position
Australia (ARIA)	18
Australia Hip-Hop/R&B Singles (ARIA)	13
Canada Hot 100 (Billboard)	6
France (SNEP)	69
Global 200 (Billboard)	12
Greece International (IFPI)	25
Italy (FIMI)	95
Lithuania (AGATA)	37
Portugal (AFP)	38
Slovakia (Singles Digitál Top 100)	78
South Africa (TOSAC)	10
Sweden (Sverigetopplistan)	90
UK Audio Streaming (Official Charts)	15
US Billboard Hot 100	11
US Hot R&B/Hip-Hop Songs (Billboard)	9

=== Year-end charts ===
Year-end chart performance for "No Friends in the Industry"
Chart (2021)	Position
US Hot R&B/Hip-Hop Songs (Billboard)	79

== Certifications ==
Certifications for "No Friends in the Industry"
Region	Certification	Certified units/sales
Australia (ARIA)	Gold	35,000^{‡}
^{‡} Sales+streaming figures based on certification alone.
