= Certified Lover Boy =

Studio album by Drake
- Released: September 3, 2021
- Recorded: 2019–2021
- Genre: Hip-hop
- Length: 86:02
- Labels: OVO; Republic
- Producers: 40; Alex Lustig; Ambezza; Austin Powerz; Bink; B-Nasty; Cardo; Dez Wright; Eli Brown; FaxOnly; Govi; Harley Arsenault; J.L.L.; BKH; Jahaan Sweet; James Francies; Jarrel Young; Jean Bleu; Kid Masterpiece; Leon Thomas III; Maneesh; Mark Borino; Masego; Metro Boomin; Monsune; Nineteen85; Noel Cadastre; OZ; PartyNextDoor; Patron; Peter Lee Johnson; Preme; Skip2Fame; Supah Mario; TM88; Too Dope; Travis Scott; Tresor; Vinylz; WondaGurl; Yebba

Drake chronology
Scary Hours 2 (2021)	Certified Lover Boy (2021)	Honestly, Nevermind (2022)

Singles from Certified Lover Boy
- 1. "Way 2 Sexy" Released: September 3, 2021; 2. "Girls Want Girls" Released: September 28, 2021; 3. "Knife Talk" Released: November 16, 2021

Certified Lover Boy is the sixth studio album by Canadian rapper Drake, released on September 3, 2021, by OVO Sound and Republic Records. Its production was handled by frequent collaborators 40, Nineteen85, PartyNextDoor, OZ, and Vinylz, among others. Lil Baby, Lil Durk, Giveon, Jay-Z, Travis Scott, Future, Young Thug, Yebba, 21 Savage, Project Pat, Tems, Ty Dolla Sign, Lil Wayne, Rick Ross, and Kid Cudi appear as guest artists. It is the first part of what Drake described as a "trilogy" of albums, that also includes the follow-ups Honestly, Nevermind and Her Loss (both 2022).

Similar to Drake's previous releases, the album predominantly deals with his views on fame and success, particularly his dominance within the music industry, alongside misplaced loyalty, tainted romances, feuds, and loneliness. Primarily a hip hop record, a hazy atmosphere dominates the album's sound, which includes elements of crunk and trap. Several writers found aspects of the album to be reminiscent of Thank Me Later (2010), Take Care (2011) and Nothing Was the Same (2013). The album's artwork, designed by English artist Damien Hirst, which features 12 emojis of pregnant women, was the subject of controversy.

Certified Lover Boy was met with mixed reviews from music critics upon release, most of whom felt it was comparable to Drake's other releases and highlighted its structure, but criticized the level of lyrical insight and the production's lack of sonic variety. Nevertheless, it was nominated for Best Rap Album at the 2022 Grammy Awards, until Drake withdrew the album from consideration in December 2021, and won Top Rap Album at the 2022 Billboard Music Awards.

The album was a commercial success, debuting at number one on the Billboard 200 with 613,000 album-equivalent units. It became Drake's tenth US number-one album and achieved the largest opening week in the US for an album in 2021 at the time, breaking Apple Music and Spotify records for the biggest opening-day streams on those platforms. It achieved the then-all-time record for the most US top-ten singles from one album (9), with its lead single, "Way 2 Sexy", debuting atop the Billboard Hot 100 as Drake's ninth US number-one hit.

== Background ==
During one of his concerts, in April 2019, Drake announced that he had started to work on a new album. In June 2019, he teased the album via Instagram, where he captioned a post with "Album mode". On December 10, Drake made a guest appearance at DaBaby's concert in Toronto, where he revealed that he was working on the album: "I'ma go back to the crib and try to finish this album up so we can turn up in 2020". In March, on Instagram Live, Drake confirmed a finalized version of "Not Around", a leaked song later retitled to "TSU", would feature on Certified Lover Boy. That same month, frequent collaborator Boi-1da previewed two snippets of songs with Drake during a Verzuz with Hit-Boy. The two snippets were dubbed "I Did" and another snippet with Roddy Ricch was dubbed "In the Cut". Drake officially announced his sixth studio album just hours before the release of Dark Lane Demo Tapes, and scheduled for release in late 2020.

Drake later previewed two new songs, one an unreleased track titled "Lie to Me" and the other a demo version of his 2020 DJ Khaled collaboration "Greece", on Instagram Live. On July 29, 2020, Drake's recording engineer Noel Cadastre revealed the album was "90% done". On August 14, 2020, Drake announced the title of the album. In October, Drake announced that the album would be released in January 2021, but it was postponed once again due to Drake suffering an anterior cruciate ligament injury.

Certified Lover Boy was dedicated to the late models Nadia Ntuli and Miss Mercedes Morr. Ntuli, who was a close friend of Drake's, was killed in a motor vehicle accident in Dubai in early 2021. Morr, born Janae Gagnier, was found dead in her Texas apartment on August 29, 2021. She was believed to be the victim of a murder–suicide. On November 26, 2022, Drake revealed that the album is part of a trilogy of albums with Honestly, Nevermind and Her Loss.

== Themes ==
Some critics found aspects of Certified Lover Boy to be reminiscent of Thank Me Later (2010), Take Care (2011) and Nothing Was the Same (2013). The album generally surrounds individualism; similar to Drake's previous records, it predominantly deals with his views on fame and success, particularly his dominance within the music industry. Further themes concern disloyalty and tainted romance, feuds and loneliness. The album is noted for its hazy atmosphere. Genres featured on the album include chipmunk soul, crunk, and trap.

Craig Jenkins of Vulture called Certified Lover Boy a "patient trickle of Drake lore and fan service that could have come out as is at almost any point along the last decade in his career". "We worry not about the shaky present and the unknowable future but about the recent past, the objects of our scorn and the ones who got away", Jenkins notes.

== Release and promotion ==
On May 1, 2020, Drake released his mixtape Dark Lane Demo Tapes, which was announced mere hours before its release. In the mixtape announcement shared on his Instagram account, Drake revealed that his sixth studio album, then untitled, would be released sometime in the third quarter of 2020. Although the album was not released that summer, the non-album single "Laugh Now Cry Later" featuring Lil Durk was released in August. On October 24, a teaser trailer for the album was released, revealing that the album was to be released in January 2021. American football player Odell Beckham Jr. later said it would be released on January 1, 2021, which later went unreleased. The teaser referenced covers of Drake's previous albums and mixtapes: So Far Gone (2009), Take Care (2011), Nothing Was the Same (2013) and Dark Lane Demo Tapes (2020). Drake announced in January 2021 that the album would no longer be released that month, due to a leg injury he sustained that required surgery.

On March 5, 2021, Drake released an extended play titled Scary Hours 2, a sequel to the 2018 EP, to generate further anticipation for the upcoming album. The EP included three songs, and includes guest appearances from Lil Baby and Rick Ross. The music video for the EP's lead single, "What's Next", premiered on the same day. All three songs from the EP respectively debuted at number one, two and three on the Billboard Hot 100. In April, Drake appeared on the YSL Records song "Solid" with Gunna and Young Thug. The song was originally intended for Certified Lover Boy, but because the album was postponed, Drake gave the song to Gunna.

On June 13, 2021, Drake revealed on Caffeine.TV that he would be releasing the album before the end of summer. Making an appearance on Fri Yiy Friday on July 30, a radio show on SiriusXM channel Sound 42, Drake revealed that Certified Lover Boy "is ready. [I'm] looking forward to delivering it". On August 27, the album's release date of September 3 was revealed during a teaser aired on ESPN's SportsCenter. Drake later confirmed the date and revealing the album artwork on August 30. That same day, billboards featuring lyrics from the album were plastered around Drake's hometown of Toronto.

On September 1, two days before the album's release, billboards were placed throughout the United States, Canada, and Nigeria revealing the album's featured artists according to their hometown. An Atlanta billboard announced 21 Savage, Future, Lil Baby, and Young Thug, a Chicago billboard announced Lil Durk, and a New York City billboard announced "the GOAT", which was assumed, and later confirmed, to be Jay-Z. A Memphis billboard announced Yebba and Project Pat, while Tems was announced on a Lagos billboard. Both Giveon and Ty Dolla Sign were announced on a California billboard. As the reveal continued, a Cleveland billboard announced Kid Cudi, a Miami billboard announced Rick Ross, cited as "the biggest boss", a Houston billboard announced Travis Scott, referred to as "the hometown hero", and another Toronto billboard announced Lil Wayne, who Drake coined as the "best rapper alive".

"Way 2 Sexy" was released as the album's lead single on September 3, 2021, as well an accompanying music video. The song peaked at number one on the Billboard Hot 100. "Girls Want Girls" featuring Lil Baby, was released to rhythmic contemporary radio on September 28, 2021, as the album's second single, the song peaked at number two on the Billboard Hot 100.

The music video for "Knife Talk" featuring 21 Savage and Project Pat, was released on November 4, 2021, The song peaked at number four on the Billboard Hot 100. It later impacted US rhythmic radio on November 16, 2021, as the album's third single.

== Artwork ==
Alternative, unused covers for Certified Lover Boy

The album's artwork features 12 iOS emojis of pregnant women in varying clothing colours, hair colours and skin tones. It was designed by English artist Damien Hirst. The artwork was met with a negative reception from fans and critics alike, who called the image "lazy" and "ridiculous". It was named the worst album artwork of the year by Exclaim! on their "30 Worst Album Covers of 2021" list.

On August 6, 2024, Drake released 100 gigabytes of media files—including behind-the-scenes clips, tour rehearsals, studio footage, and three unheard tracks—which were posted to Instagram, via an account named plottttwistttttt, as well as to the ad-hoc website 100gigs.org. Among the 100 gigabytes of media were several unused artworks, which were uncovered for previously released Drake albums, including Honestly, Nevermind (2022), Her Loss (2022), For All the Dogs (2023); there was also a scrapped sequel of Care Package (2019). An unseen promotional poster for Drake's It's All a Blur Tour, as well as unseen artworks and posters (such as three unused cover arts for Certified Lover Boy), were all released to 100gigs.

== Critical reception ==
Professional ratings
Aggregate scores
Source	Rating
AnyDecentMusic?	5.5/10
Metacritic	60/100
Review scores
Source	Rating
AllMusic	3/5 stars
The Arts Desk	3/5 stars
Clash	6/10
Entertainment Weekly	C
The Guardian	3/5 stars
The Independent	2/5 stars
The Line of Best Fit	5/10
NME	2/5 stars
Pitchfork	6.6/10
Rolling Stone	3.5/5 stars

Certified Lover Boy was met with mixed reviews. At Metacritic, the album received an average score of 60 out of 100 based on 20 reviews, indicating "mixed or average reviews". Aggregator AnyDecentMusic? gave it 5.5 out of 10, based on their assessment of the critical consensus.

Reviewing the album for Pitchfork, Matthew Strauss stated, "With much of Certified Lover Boy, Drake seems to be doing what he thinks Drake would do, and ticking the box is taking its toll". Brandon Yu of Variety praised the album, stating, "Certified Lover Boy is a perfectly fine record – it's expensively well-produced, like all of Drake's albums, and easily likable with a decent batting average for a nearly hour-and-a-half record". Okla Jones of Consequence said, "Drake's new release may lack some of the variety of his previous albums, but its concepts and musical structure make for a solid body of work". Mikael Wood of the Los Angeles Times wrote a glowing review of the album, defending Drake's usage of an R. Kelly credit as a "thoughtless error", and saying it "expertly displays his strengths" while showing a new tendency to understate his accomplishments by merely predicting in "You Only Live Twice" that the album would go platinum when previous albums have been certified platinum several times. Wood described the album as being "enjoyment even at its bleakest".

In a lukewarm review, The Guardian's Alim Kheraj wrote, "Personally, sonically and thematically, Drake seems resistant to change. It's frustrating: the songs aren't bad, and in some cases they're excellent, a reminder of the unflattering emotional honesty that initially set him apart from his peers. However, they also hew to a formula that works for him". Nathan Evans of Clash said, "Aubrey Graham hands over his fifth project to cross 80 minutes, an hour and a half smorgasbord of all-new tracks. In his defence, the Drake cuisine is far too extensive and varied at this point, but this dilemma has been around for a number of years now and some sort of sacrifice for a better, more cohesive project has to be made if he wants to release another classic".

Writing for The Independent, Sam Moore stated, "Certified Lover Boy's greatest crime is just how bland and boring it is. There's very little here that Drake has not done better or more emphatically elsewhere; his album is deprived of any kind of experimentation or insight. He rose to the top baring his soul. Now it feels like there's no soul to bare". In a mixed review, The Arts Desk's Harry Thorfinn-George stated, "A lot of CLB feels rehashed, but the way it captures Drake at an awkward junction in his life is intriguing". Gary Suarez of Entertainment Weekly said, "The new album is like watching the eighth season of a sitcom and growing hyper-aware of all the recycled jokes and actors' laugh lines".

=== Year-end lists ===
Select year-end rankings of Certified Lover Boy
Publication	List	Rank	Ref.
Billboard	The 50 Best Albums of 2021	18	
Complex	The Best Albums of 2021	12	
Rolling Stone	The 50 Best Albums of 2021	48	
Rolling Stone	The 20 Best Hip-Hop Albums of 2021	10	
Vibe	The 21 Best Hip-Hop Albums of 2021	14	

=== Industry awards ===
Certified Lover Boy was nominated for Best Rap Album at the 2022 Grammy Awards until Drake withdrew the nomination on December 6, 2021.

Awards and nominations for Certified Lover Boy
Year	Ceremony	Category	Result	Ref.
2021	American Music Awards	Favorite Rap/Hip Hop Album	Nominated	
2022	BET Awards	Album of the Year	Nominated	
2022	BET Hip Hop Awards	Album of the Year	Nominated	
2022	Billboard Music Awards	Top Billboard 200 Album	Nominated	
2022	Billboard Music Awards	Top Rap Album	Won	
2022	iHeartRadio Music Awards	Best Comeback Album	Nominated	
2022	NAACP Image Awards	Outstanding Album	Nominated	

== Commercial performance ==
Certified Lover Boy was highly anticipated. It broke Apple Music and Spotify 2021 records for largest streaming debut within a single day, beating Drake's own previous album Scorpion (2018). The album set the record for most US top-ten singles from one album, with lead single "Way 2 Sexy" becoming his ninth number one, surpassing albums by Michael Jackson, Janet Jackson and Bruce Springsteen.

In the United States, Certified Lover Boy debuted at number one on the Billboard 200 chart as Drake's tenth consecutive chart-topping album in the country. It opened with 613,000 album-equivalent units, which consists of 46,000 album sales, and 562,000 streaming units calculated from the 743.7 million on-demand streams of the album's tracks. The 613,000 tally marked the biggest debut-week units of 2021 at that time, surpassing Kanye West's Donda (309,000), and the biggest opening week since Taylor Swift's Folklore (2020) debuted with 846,000 units. Drake became the eighth artist in the Billboard 200 history to accumulate ten number-one albums. Certified Lover Boy also marked the biggest week for an R&B/hip-hop album, a rap album, and an album by a male artist, since his own Scorpion. As of December 27, 2021, Certified Lover Boy was the third best-selling album of the year according to Hits, moved a total 1,850,000 album-equivalent units, including 67,000 pure album sales, 181,000 song sales, 2.275 billion audio-on-demand streams, and 110 million video-on-demand streams. As of January 7, 2022, the album has moved two million album-equivalent units, being only rap album from 2021 to reach double platinum status. The album was the tenth best-selling album of the 2022 in the United States, according to Hits, moved a total 1,197,000 album-equivalent units. On October 25, 2023, the album was certified triple platinum by the Recording Industry Association of America (RIAA) for combined sales and album-equivalent units of over a three millions units in the United States. As of December 27, 2023, Certified Lover Boy was the thirty second best-selling album of the year according to Hits, moved a total 862,000 album-equivalent units.

In the United Kingdom, Certified Lover Boy debuted at number one on the UK Albums Chart with 46,000 units sold in its first week while the tracks were streamed 70.4 million times, accounting for 96% of his first-week sales, becoming Drake's fourth album to reach the top spot in the country.

In February 2022, the International Federation of the Phonographic Industry (IFPI) reported that Drake was the world's fourth best selling artist of 2021, behind BTS, Taylor Swift and Adele.

== Track listing ==
Certified Lover Boy track listing
No.	Title	Writer(s)	Producer(s)	Length
1.	"Champagne Poetry"	Aubrey Graham; Noah Shebib; Micah Davis; Maneesh Bidaye; Jean-Andre Lawrence; John Lennon; Paul McCartney; Gabriel Hardeman, Jr.	40; J.L.L.; Masego; Maneesh; Shlohmo^{[a]}	5:36
2.	"Papi's Home"	Graham; Jonathan Priester; Oriyomi Ojelade; Jarrel Young; Mark Borino; Raynford Humphrey; Montell Jordan; Anthony Crawford	Supah Mario; Skip2Fame; Young; Borino; Preme	2:58
3.	"Girls Want Girls" (featuring Lil Baby)	Graham; Dominique Jones; Ozan Yildirim; Mathias Liyew	Oz; Ambezza	3:41
4.	"In the Bible" (featuring Lil Durk and Giveon)	Graham; Durk Banks; Giveon Evans; Shebib; Leon Thomas III; Eliel Afari-Brown; Austin Schindler; Simon Gebrelul	40; Thomas; Eli Brown; Austin Powerz	4:56
5.	"Love All" (featuring Jay-Z)	Graham; Shawn Carter; Yildirim; Dylan Cleary-Krell; Thomas; Khristopher Riddick-Tynes; Christopher Wallace; Sean Combs; Steven Jordan	Oz; Dez Wright; Thomas	3:48
6.	"Fair Trade" (featuring Travis Scott)	Graham; Jacques Webster II; Yildirim; Ebony Oshunrinde; Jahaan Sweet; Stephane Reibaldi; Charlotte Day Wilson; Kenneth Edmonds; Varren Wade; Marcus Reddick; Brandon Banks; Kyla Moscovich; Michael Gordon; Dernst Emile II; Teo Halm	Travis Scott; Oz; WondaGurl; Sweet; Patron	4:51
7.	"Way 2 Sexy" (featuring Future and Young Thug)	Graham; Nayvadius Wilburn; Jeffery Williams; Bryan Simmons; Lesidney Ragland; Fred Fairbrass; Richard Fairbrass; Robert Manzoli	TM88; Too Dope	4:17
8.	"TSU"	Graham; Harley Arsenault; Noel Cadastre; Christopher Cross; Robert Kelly; Justin Timberlake; Timothy Mosley; Floyd Hills	Arsenault; Cadastre^{[c]}; OG Ron C^{[a]}	5:08
9.	"N 2 Deep" (featuring Future)	Graham; Wilburn; Arsenault; Kaushik Barua; Shebib; Alexander Lustig; Cadastre; Bernard Freeman; Chad Butler; Joseph McVey IV; Jay Jenkins; S. Carter; Leroy Williams, Jr.	Arsenault; Kid Masterpiece; 40^{[c]}; Alex Lustig^{[c]}; Cadastre^{[a]}	4:33
10.	"Pipe Down"	Graham; Thomas; Robert Fairfax III; Abdelhady Hafez; Anthoine Walters; Lazaro Camejo; Derek Kastal; Gebrelul	Thomas; FaxOnly; Jean Bleu; Walters^{[a]}	3:25
11.	"Yebba's Heartbreak" (with Yebba)	Abigail Smith; James Francies	Yebba; Francies; 40	2:13
12.	"No Friends in the Industry"	Graham; Anderson Hernandez; Yildirim; Nicolas Frascona; Robert DeBarge, Jr.; Gregory Williams	Vinylz; OZ; Nik D^{[c]}	3:24
13.	"Knife Talk" (with 21 Savage featuring Project Pat)	Graham; Shéyaa Abraham-Joseph; Patrick Houston; Leland Wayne; Peter Lee Johnson; Jordan Houston; Rakim Mayers; Robert Mandell; Jerami Davis	Metro Boomin; Johnson	4:02
14.	"7AM on Bridle Path"	Graham; Ronald LaTour, Jr.; Cleary-Krell; David Duodu; Bidaye	Cardo; Dez Wright; KND^{[c]}; Maneesh^{[a]}; Jarom Su'a^{[c]}; Arum the Producer^{[c]}; Dude Clayy^{[c]}	3:59
15.	"Race My Mind"	Graham; Shebib; Scott Zhang; Nile Goveia; Wallace; Osten Harvey; David Axelrod; Michael Axelrod; Herman Blount; James Johnson Jr.	40; Monsune; Govi	4:29
16.	"Fountains" (featuring Tems)	Graham; Temilade Openiyi; Tresor Riziki	Tresor; Monsune; 40; Batundi^{[a]}	3:12
17.	"Get Along Better" (featuring Ty Dolla Sign)	Graham; Tyrone Griffin Jr.; Anthony Jeffries; Shebib; Cadastre	Nineteen85; 40^{[c]}; Cadastre^{[c]}	3:49
18.	"You Only Live Twice" (featuring Lil Wayne and Rick Ross)	Graham; Dwayne Carter Jr.; William Roberts II; Roosevelt Harrell III; Brian Reid	Bink; B-Nasty^{[a]}	3:33
19.	"IMY2" (featuring Kid Cudi)	Graham; Scott Mescudi; Arsenault; Clifford Owuor; Ayoub Benfaress; Kaniel Castañeda; Eddy Bizimana; Dounia Aznou	Arsenault; Clibbo^{[c]}; Houssam^{[c]}; KanielTheOne^{[a]}; 3ddy^{[a]}; Yume^{[a]}	4:12
20.	"Fucking Fans"	Graham; Jahron Brathwaite; Cadastre; Shebib; Peter Ring	PartyNextDoor; Cadastre; 40^{[a]}; Aliby^{[a]}	4:05
21.	"The Remorse"	Graham; Anthony Hamilton; Shebib	40	5:51
Total length:				86:02

Notes

- ^{^[c]} signifies a co-producer
- ^{^[a]} signifies an additional producer

Sample credits

- "Champagne Poetry" contains samples of:
  - "Navajo", written by Micah Davis and Jean-Andre Lawrence, as performed by Masego, which itself samples "Michelle", written by John Lennon and Paul McCartney, as performed by The Singers Unlimited;
  - and "Until I Found the Lord (My Soul Couldn't Rest)", written by Gabriel Hardeman Jr., as performed by the Gabriel Hardeman Delegation.
- "Papi's Home" contains samples from "Daddy's Home", written by Montell Jordan and Anthony Crawford, as performed by Jordan.
- "Girls Want Girls" contains interpolations of "Time Flies", written by Aubrey Graham and Ozan Yildirim, as performed by Drake.
- "Love All" contains a sample from "Life After Death Intro", written by Christopher Wallace, Sean Combs and Steven Jordan, as performed by The Notorious B.I.G.
- "Fair Trade" contains samples of "Mountains", written by Charlotte Day Wilson, Kenneth Edmonds, Varrel Wade, Marcus Reddick, Brandon Banks, Kyla Moscovich, Michael Gordon, Dernst Emile II and Teo Halm, as performed by Wilson.
- "Way 2 Sexy" contains elements of "I'm Too Sexy", written by Fred Fairbrass, Richard Fairbrass and Robert Manzoli, as performed by Right Said Fred.
- "TSU" contains samples of:
  - "Half" by OG Ron C, which itself is a remix of "Half on a Baby", written and performed by R. Kelly;
  - "Sailing", written by Christopher Cross, as performed by NSYNC;
  - and "Until the End of Time", written by Justin Timberlake, Timothy Mosley, and Floyd Hills, as performed by Timberlake.
- "N 2 Deep" contains samples of "Get Throwed", written by Bernard Freeman, Chad Butler, Jay Jenkins, Shawn Carter, Joseph McVey IV and Leroy Williams Jr., as performed by Bun B.
- "No Friends in the Industry" contains samples of:
  - "I Call Your Name", written by Robert DeBarge Jr and Gregory Williams, as performed by Switch;
  - and "Niggaz Ain't Barin Dat", written by Paul Beauregard and Jordan Houston, and performed by Three 6 Mafia.
- "Knife Talk" contains samples of "Feed the Streets", written by Jordan Houston, Patrick Houston, Rakim Mayers, Leland Wayne, Robert Mandell and Jerami Davis, as performed by Juicy J.
- "Race My Mind" contains:
  - samples of "Dead Wrong", written by Christopher Wallace and Osten Harvey, as performed by The Notorious B.I.G.;
  - "The Signs Part IV", written by David Axelrod and Michael Axelrod, as performed by David Axelrod;
  - "Rumpelstiltskin", written by Herman Blount, as performed by Sun Ra;
  - and interpolations of "Give It to Me Baby", written by James Johnson Jr., as performed by Rick James.
- "You Only Live Twice" contains uncredited samples of "Can't Get You Off of My Mind", written by Richard Dunbar, Fred Bridges and Bobby Eaton, as performed by the Brothers of Soul.

== Personnel ==
Performers

- Mark Ronson – additional vocals (2)
- Chubbs – additional vocals (2)
- Roxx – additional vocals (2)
- Nicki Minaj – background vocals (2)
- DJ Screw – background vocals (8)
- Kiefer – piano (13)
- Brian "B-Nasty" Reid – keyboards (18)
- Harley Arsenault – bass, drums, keyboards (19)
- PartyNextDoor – background vocals (20)
- Anthony Hamilton – additional vocals (21)

Technical

- Chris Athens – mastering engineer
- Noah "40" Shebib – mix engineer (all tracks), recording engineer (4, 6, 8–10, 15–17, 20)
- Les "Bates" Bateman – engineer (1–5, 18), recording engineer (1)
- Harley Arsenault – recording engineer (2, 3, 7, 12)
- Noel Cadastre – recording engineer (3–6, 8–10, 12–21), assistant mixer (1–5, 18)
- John Rooney – recording engineer (11)
- Young Guru – vocal engineer (5)
- Eric Manco – vocal engineer (7, 9)
- Dave Huffman – assistant mastering engineer (1–5, 18)
- Greg Moffet – assistant mixer (1–5, 18)

== Charts ==
=== Weekly charts ===
Weekly chart performance
Chart (2021)	Peak position
Australian Albums (ARIA)	1
Austrian Albums (Ö3 Austria)	3
Belgian Albums (Ultratop Flanders)	2
Belgian Albums (Ultratop Wallonia)	3
Canadian Albums (Billboard)	1
Czech Albums (ČNS IFPI)	5
Danish Albums (Hitlisten)	1
Dutch Albums (Album Top 100)	1
Finnish Albums (Suomen virallinen lista)	3
French Albums (SNEP)	3
German Albums (Offizielle Top 100)	3
Icelandic Albums (Tónlistinn)	1
Irish Albums (Official Charts)	1
Italian Albums (FIMI)	2
Japanese Digital Albums (Oricon)	37
Lithuanian Albums (AGATA)	1
New Zealand Albums (RMNZ)	1
Norwegian Albums (VG-lista)	1
Portuguese Albums (AFP)	43
Slovak Albums (ČNS IFPI)	2
Spanish Albums (Promusicae)	5
Swedish Albums (Sverigetopplistan)	1
Swiss Albums (Schweizer Hitparade)	2
UK Albums (Official Charts)	1
UK R&B Albums (Official Charts)	2
US Billboard 200	1
US Top R&B/Hip-Hop Albums (Billboard)	1

=== Year-end charts ===
Year-end chart performance
Chart (2021)	Position
Australian Albums (ARIA)	18
Austrian Albums (Ö3 Austria)	60
Belgian Albums (Ultratop Flanders)	36
Belgian Albums (Ultratop Wallonia)	92
Canadian Albums (Billboard)	7
Danish Albums (Hitlisten)	16
Dutch Albums (Album Top 100)	21
French Albums (SNEP)	131
Icelandic Albums (Tónlistinn)	27
Irish Albums (IRMA)	24
New Zealand Albums (RMNZ)	19
Norwegian Albums (VG-lista)	20
Swiss Albums (Schweizer Hitparade)	30
UK Albums (OCC)	22
US Billboard 200	5
US Top R&B/Hip-Hop Albums (Billboard)	2

Year-end chart performance
Chart (2022)	Position
Australian Albums (ARIA)	31
Belgian Albums (Ultratop Flanders)	54
Belgian Albums (Ultratop Wallonia)	119
Canadian Albums (Billboard)	7
Danish Albums (Hitlisten)	44
Dutch Albums (Album Top 100)	38
French Albums (SNEP)	184
Icelandic Albums (Tónlistinn)	38
Lithuanian Albums (AGATA)	50
New Zealand Albums (RMNZ)	22
UK Albums (OCC)	34
US Billboard 200	9
US Top R&B/Hip-Hop Albums (Billboard)	1

Year-end chart performance
Chart (2023)	Position
Australian Albums (ARIA)	68
Belgian Albums (Ultratop Flanders)	122
Canadian Albums (Billboard)	24
Danish Albums (Hitlisten)	97
Dutch Albums (Album Top 100)	88
Swiss Albums (Schweizer Hitparade)	97
UK Albums (OCC)	79
US Billboard 200	27
US Top R&B/Hip-Hop Albums (Billboard)	9

Year-end chart performance
Chart (2024)	Position
Australian Hip Hop/R&B Albums (ARIA)	30
Belgian Albums (Ultratop Flanders)	185
US Billboard 200	61
US Top R&B/Hip-Hop Albums (Billboard)	20

Year-end chart performance
Chart (2025)	Position
Belgian Albums (Ultratop Flanders)	164
US Billboard 200	85
US Top R&B/Hip-Hop Albums (Billboard)	29

== Certifications ==
Certifications
Region	Certification	Certified units/sales
Australia (ARIA)	Platinum	70,000^{‡}
Belgium (BRMA)	Platinum	20,000^{‡}
Denmark (IFPI Danmark)	Platinum	20,000^{‡}
France (SNEP)	Platinum	100,000^{‡}
Italy (FIMI)	Platinum	50,000^{‡}
New Zealand (RMNZ)	2× Platinum	30,000^{‡}
Poland (ZPAV)	Platinum	20,000^{‡}
United Kingdom (BPI)	Platinum	300,000^{‡}
United States (RIAA)	5× Platinum	5,000,000^{‡}
^{‡} Sales+streaming figures based on certification alone.
