= APRA billion streams list =

The APRA billion streams list or The 1,000,000,000 list was established in 2019 by APRA AMCOS (Australasian Performing Right Association and Australasian Mechanical Copyright Owners Society) to acknowledge Australasian songwriters whose works have achieved one billion (1,000,000,000) streams on various services. Streaming services used for the list include Apple Music, Amazon Music, Google Play, Spotify, Vevo, and YouTube.

Australian-born singer-songwriter Sia is the most prolific writer on the list, with a total of 15 entries, as from October 2022.

List of recipients, with year certified, song(s) certified, writers, and references shown
Year	Song(s)	Writer(s)	Ref(s)
2019	"Friends"	Nat Dunn	
2019	"Be Alright"	Dean Lewis; Jon Hume	
2019	"Never Be Like You"	Harley Streten p.k.a. Flume	
2019	"This Girl"	Jake Mason; Dan West; Ivan Khatchoyan; (p.k.a. Cookin' on 3 Burners)	
2019	"Call on Me"	Starley Hope p.k.a. Starley; Peter Wadams p.k.a. P-Money	
2019	"Youth"	Troye Sivan; Alex Hope	
2020	"Dance Monkey"	Toni Watson p.k.a. Tones and I	
2020	"Youngblood"	Calum Hood; Ashton Irwin; Luke Hemmings (p.k.a. 5 Seconds of Summer); Ali Tamposi; Andrew Watt; Louis Bell	
2020	"Whatever It Takes", "Young Dumb & Broke"	Joel Little	
2020	"Stay"; "The Middle"	Sarah Aarons	
2020	"Somebody That I Used to Know"	Wouter de Backer p.k.a. Gotye	
2020	"Riptide"	James Keogh p.k.a. Vance Joy	
2020	"In My Mind"	Ivan Gough; Aden Forte; Josh Soon (p.k.a. Feenixpawl); Georgi Kay	
2020	"Alive"; "Chained to the Rhythm"; "Chandelier"; "Cheap Thrills"; "Diamonds"; "Dusk Till Dawn"; "Elastic Heart"; "The Greatest"; "Titanium"	Sia Furler p.k.a. Sia	
2020	"Bad"	Vassy Karagiorgos p.k.a. Vassy	
2021	"Needed Me"	Lewis Hughes; Nicholas Audino; Khaled Rohaim; Te Whiti Warbrick p.k.a. Twice as Nice	
2021	"The Less I Know the Better"	Kevin Parker	
2021	"Astronaut in the Ocean"	Harry Michael and Tyron Hapi	
2021	"Company"	Leroy Clampitt and James Wong	
2021	"Royals"	Lorde and Joel Little	
2021	"Me!"	Joel Little	
2021	"Break My Heart"	Andrew Farriss and Michael Hutchence	
2021	"Heaven"	Lindsay Rimes	
2022	"Supalonely"	Benee and Josh Fountain	
2022	"Head & Heart"	John Courtidis	
2022	"Just a Dream"	David Ryan Harris	
2022	"Wild Ones", "Flashlight", "Thunderclouds", "Flames", "She Wolf (Falling to Pieces)", "Try Everything"	Sia	
2022	"Down Under"	Colin Hay	
2022	"Cold Heart (Pnau remix)"	Nicholas Littlemore, Peter Mayes and Sam Littlemore	
2023	"July"	PJ Harding	
2023	"Love Tonight"	Shouse (Jack Madin and Ed Service)	
2023	"Go Crazy"	Trè Samuels	
2024	"Walking on a Dream"	Nicholas Littlemore, Luke Steele and Jonathan Sloan	
2024	"You Say"	Paul Mabury	
2024	"Freaks"	Ivan Gough, Timothy Jude Smith p.k.a. Timmy Trumpet, Jeremy Alexander Bunawan, Mathieu Francois E Valton and Demetrius Christian Savelio p.k.a. Savage	
