= Summer (Cassadee Pope EP) =

EP by Cassadee Pope
- Released: June 3, 2016
- Recorded: 2015–16
- Genre: Country, country pop
- Length: 13:04
- Label: Republic Nashville
- Producer: Corey Crowder

Cassadee Pope chronology
Frame by Frame (2013)	Summer (2016)	Stages (2019)

Singles from Summer
- 1. "Summer" Released: June 3, 2016

Summer is the second EP by American singer-songwriter Cassadee Pope, released through Republic Nashville on June 3, 2016. The title track was released as the EP's lead single on the same day and has since reached 55 on Country Airplay.

Upon release, the EP debuted at No. 164 on the Billboard 200, but bowed at number 14 on the Top Country Albums sales chart, with 3,800 copies sold in its first week.

== Background ==
After "I Wish I Could Break Your Heart" stalled on the country charts in mid-2014, promotion for the song's parent album, Frame by Frame, ended and Pope began working on a follow-up record. "I Am Invincible" was released in July 2015 as the intended lead single for Pope's forthcoming second studio album but failed to reach to top 50 of the Country Airplay chart. However, Pope did reach the number one spot on both the American and Canadian country airplay charts in 2016 with her duet with Chris Young, titled "Think of You", featured on Young's 2015 album, I'm Comin' Over.

To capitalize on the success and recognition stemming from the song, Pope recorded a new set of songs with the track's producer, Corey Crowder. Pope co-wrote three of the four songs on the EP, including the lead single, "Summer". The extended play was announced in early May 2016 and was released on June 3, 2016. The title track impacted country radio on June 6, 2016. According to Pope, the theme of the record is self-confidence and the songs all tell a story and "[touch] on different experiences that I've had."

== Track listing ==
No.	Title	Writer(s)	Length
1.	"Summer"	Cassadee Pope; Kelly Archer; Emily Shackelton	3:09
2.	"Piano"	Pope; Jimmy Robbins; Laura Veltz	3:04
3.	"Kisses at Airports"	Jessi Alexander; Connie Harrington; Chase McGill	3:23
4.	"Alien"	Pope; Ross Copperman; Jon Nite	3:28
Total length:			13:04

== Chart performance ==
Chart (2016)	Peak position
US Billboard 200	164
US Top Country Albums (Billboard)	14
