= Cassadee Pope =

American singer and songwriter (born 1989)

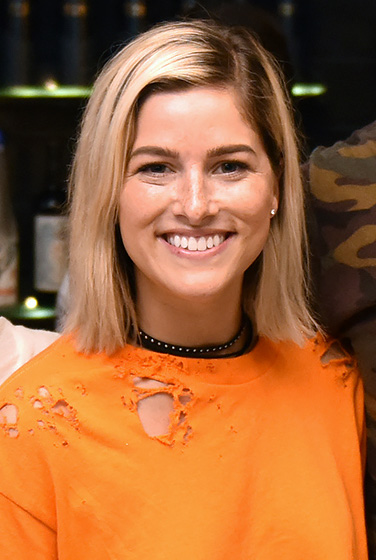
- Pope in 2019

Background information
- Born: Cassadee Blake Pope; August 28, 1989 (age 37); West Palm Beach, Florida, U.S.
- Genres: Country pop; pop rock; power pop; pop-punk; emo pop
- Occupations: Singer; songwriter
- Years active: 2008–present
- Labels: Universal; Nashville Harbor; DCD2; Awake Music
- Member of: Hey Monday
- Website: cassadeepope.com

Cassadee Blake Pope (born August 28, 1989) is an American singer and songwriter. She is the lead vocalist and songwriter of the pop punk band Hey Monday, with whom she released one studio album and two EPs. Pope embarked on a solo career in early 2012 and released the EP Cassadee Pope in May 2012. She took part in the 3rd season of The Voice and became the first female winner in December 2012. Her debut solo country album, Frame by Frame, was released in 2013 to a top 10 Billboard 200 charting. It debuted at No. 1 on Top Country Albums, with 43,000 copies sold in its first week.

== Life and career ==
=== 2008–2011: Career beginnings and Hey Monday ===
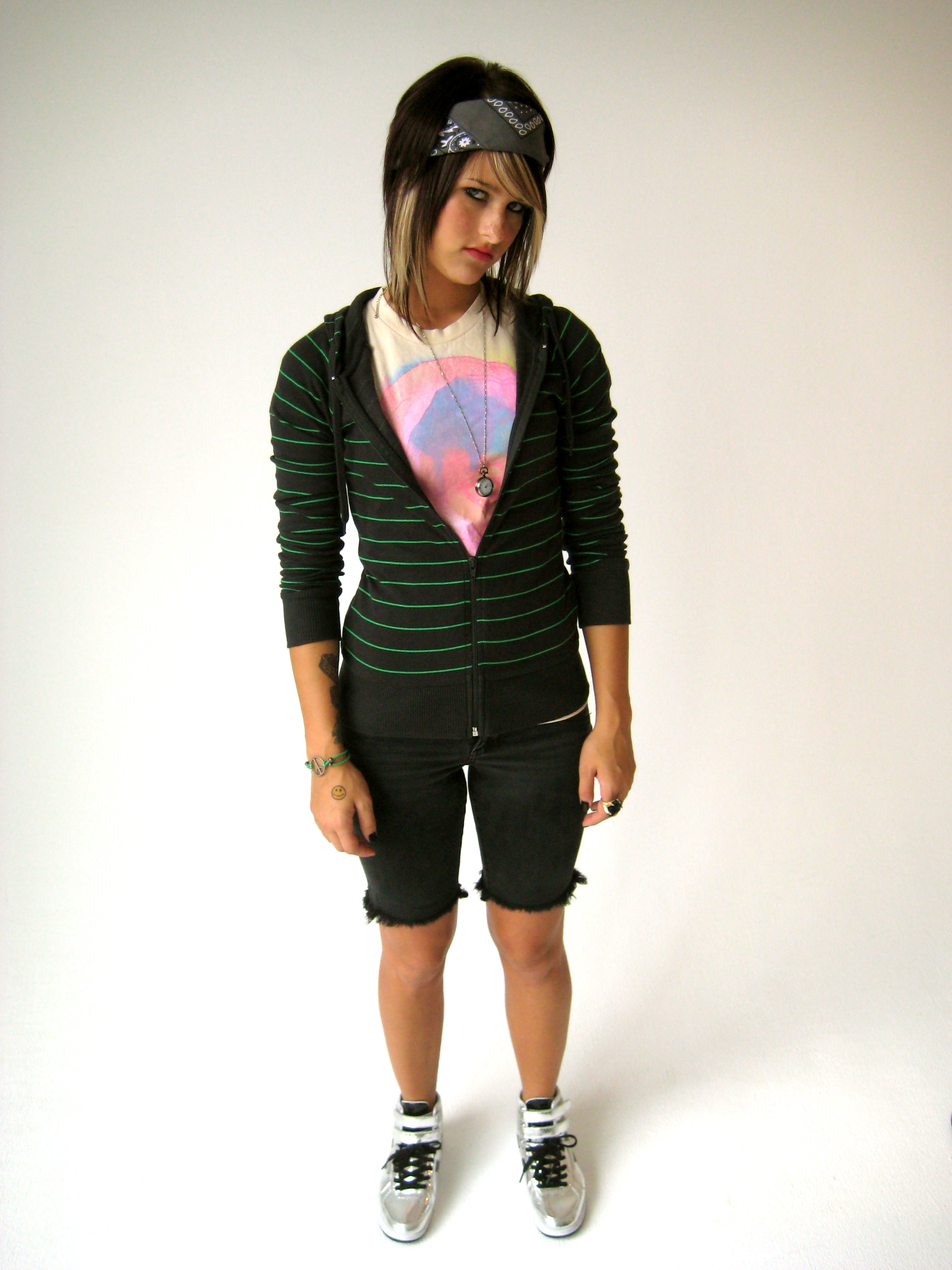
Pope in 2008

While attending Wellington High School in Wellington, Florida, Pope formed the band Blake with her friend Mike Gentile. The project disbanded before being signed. In 2008, she and Gentile founded the pop punk band Hey Monday along with Alex Lipshaw, Michael "Jersey" Moriarty, and Elliot James. Hey Monday released their first studio album, Hold on Tight, in October 2008. Pope wrote two songs and co-wrote the other nine songs. She appeared in Fall Out Boy's video for "America's Suitehearts", from their 2008 album Folie à Deux. She also provided guest vocals for The Cab's remix version of their song "Take My Hand" that appeared on Fall Out Boy's mixtape, Welcome to the New Administration, and appeared in the music video for it the following summer of 2009. James left the band at the end of 2009. Hey Monday's first EP Beneath It All was released in August 2010; to promote the album the group toured the US and played on the 2010 Warped Tour. The Christmas EP was released on December 6, 2011, and later that month Hey Monday took an indefinite hiatus on good terms.

=== 2012–2014: Solo career, The Voice and Frame by Frame ===
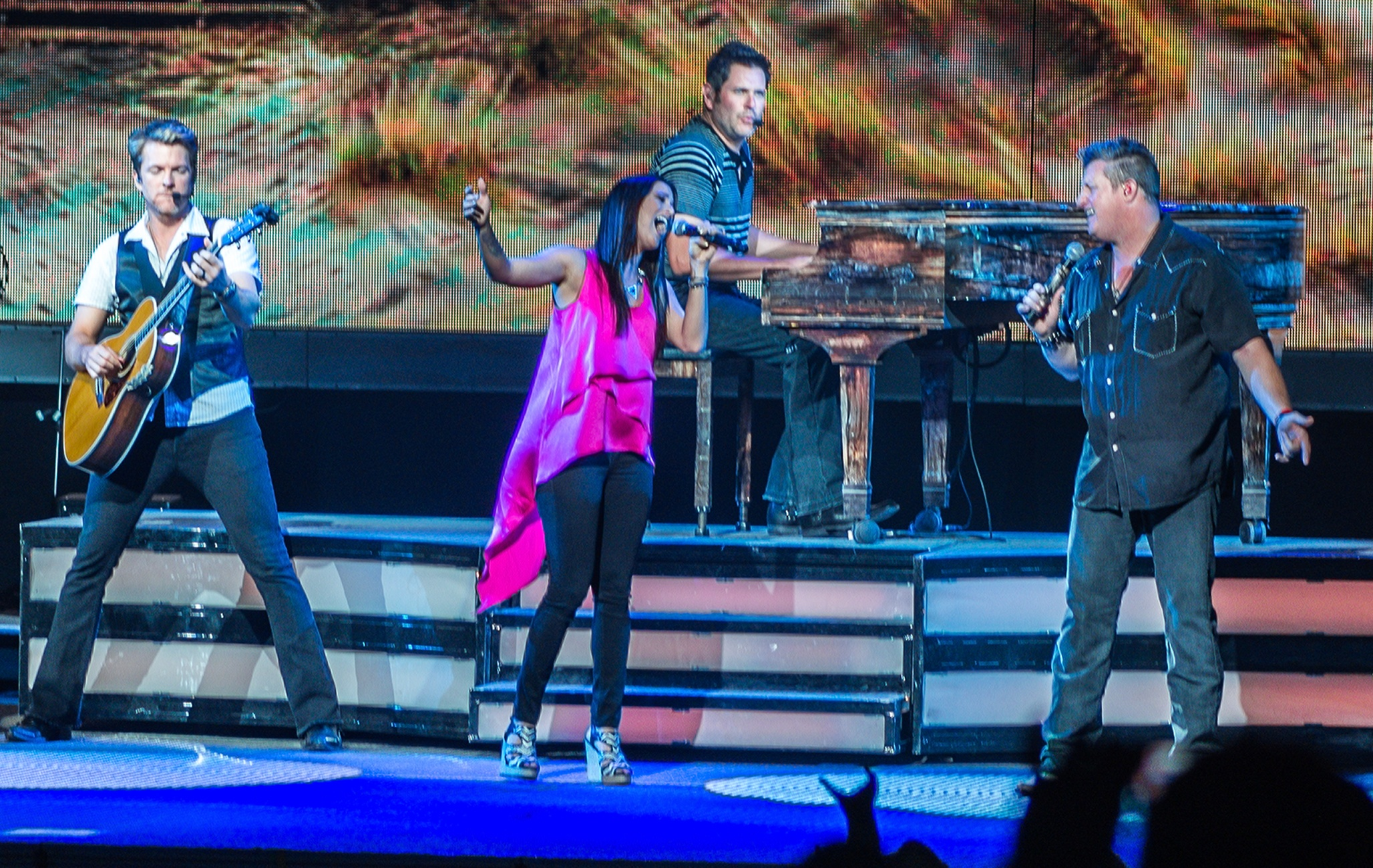
Pope performing with Rascal Flatts in 2013

In January and February 2012, Pope embarked on her first solo acoustic tour across the east and west coasts of the United States. She released her debut self-titled EP (self-labeled) on May 22, 2012, containing four songs written by Pope. She auditioned for season 3 of the singing competition The Voice during the summer and had all four coaches offer her a place on their teams; she ultimately picked country singer Blake Shelton. In the third live round, Pope performed "Over You", co-written by mentor Shelton. The song reached number one on the iTunes chart, beating Psy's "Gangnam Style" down to number two. She was the only female contestant to advance to the Top 4 round in the season where she performed "Stupid Boy" by country singer-songwriter Keith Urban, which also reached number one on iTunes. She advanced to The Voice finals, winning the title on the live finale results day in December. An album compiling her performances on The Voice entitled The Voice: The Complete Season 3 Collection reached number 1 on the Heatseekers and sold 11,000 copies, and 8,000 more copies in the following week. Her self-titled EP also re-entered the chart at number 42, selling 1,000 copies.

=== The Voice (2012) ===
– Studio version of performance reached the top 10 on iTunes

Stage	Song	Original Artist	Date	Order	Result
Blind Audition	"Torn"	Ednaswap	Sept. 25, 2012	7.6	All four chairs turned Joined Team Blake
Battles (Top 64)	"Not Over You" (vs Ryan Jirovec)	Gavin DeGraw	Oct. 22, 2012	14.4	Saved by Blake
Knockouts	"Payphone" (vs Suzanna Choffel)	Maroon 5	Oct. 30, 2012	17.10	Saved by Blake
Live Playoffs	"My Happy Ending"	Avril Lavigne	Nov. 5, 2012	18.5	Saved by Public Vote
Live Top 12	"Behind These Hazel Eyes"	Kelly Clarkson	Nov. 12, 2012	21.7	Saved by Public Vote
Live Top 10	"Over You"	Miranda Lambert	Nov. 19, 2012	23.9	Saved by Public Vote
Live Top 8	"Are You Happy Now?"	Michelle Branch	Nov. 26, 2012	25.8	Saved by Public Vote
Live Top 6	"Stand"	Rascal Flatts	Dec. 3, 2012	27.2	Saved by Public Vote
Live Top 6	"I'm With You"	Avril Lavigne	Dec. 3, 2012	27.11	Saved by Public Vote
Live Top 4 (Semifinals)	"Stupid Boy"	Keith Urban	Dec. 10, 2012	29.3	Saved by Public Vote
Live Finale (Final 3)	"Over You"	Miranda Lambert	Dec. 17, 2012	31.2	Winner
Live Finale (Final 3)	"Steve McQueen" (with Blake Shelton)	Sheryl Crow	Dec. 17, 2012	31.6	Winner
Live Finale (Final 3)	"Cry"	Faith Hill	Dec. 17, 2012	31.9	Winner

In January 2013, Pope signed with country music label Republic Nashville; the lead single of her solo album, "Wasting All These Tears", was released on May 31, 2013. It debuted at number 37 on the Billboard Hot 100 and number 7 on the Billboard Hot Country Songs chart. It sold 125,000 copies in first week of release. The album, Frame by Frame, was released in October 2013. Pope spent most of 2014 touring with country artists Tim McGraw and Dierks Bentley. She also was featured on the Nashville Outlaws: A Tribute to Mötley Crüe album where she covered "The Animal In Me".

=== 2015–2021: Summer EP, Stages, and Thrive ===
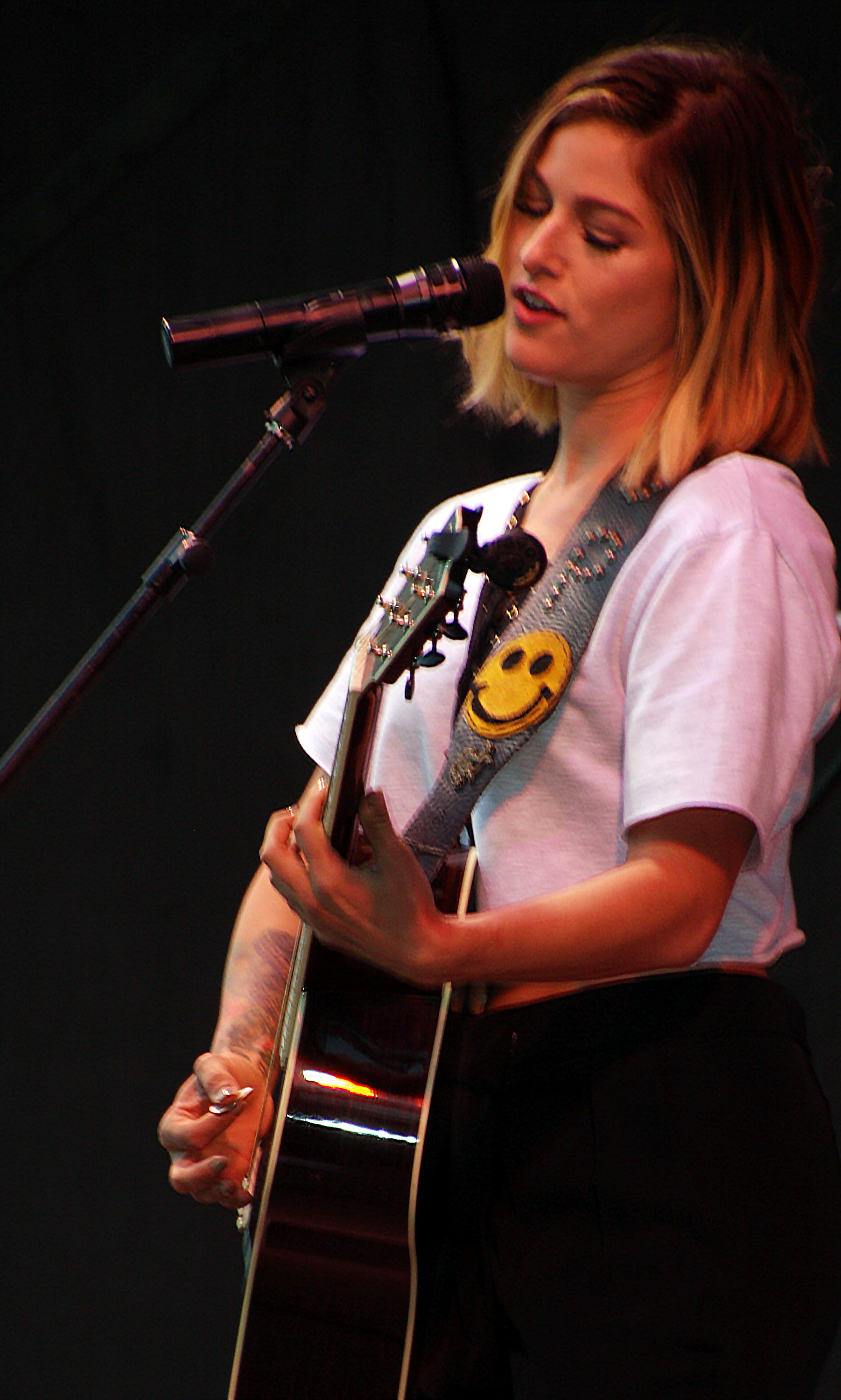
Pope playing acoustic guitar in 2017

Pope released the lead single, "I Am Invincible" from her then-upcoming second studio album. During late 2015, Pope recorded a duet with Chris Young, titled "Think of You" for his 2015 album I'm Comin' Over. This single became Pope's first song to peak at number one on the US Country Airplay chart in May 2016. In March 2017, Pope traveled to London and performed several times as part of the C2C: Country to Country festival lineup, including an appearance on the main stage with Young.

Pope's EP, Summer, was released on June 3, 2016, and the title track was released as a single on June 6, 2016.

In 2016, Pope performed the "Star Spangled Banner", the United States national anthem, at two sporting events, first before the Brickyard 400 NASCAR race at the Indianapolis Motor Speedway on July 24, and second before the Houston Texans and Colts game on October 16.

Pope and Young were nominated for Best Country Duo/Group Performance for "Think of You", making her first contestant from The Voice to receive a Grammy nomination. In May 2017, Pope departed with Nashville Harbor Records & Entertainment.

On March 30, 2018, she independently released her first single in nearly two years, called "Take You Home". It was followed on August 10 by her second single of 2018, called "One More Red Light".

On February 1, 2019, Pope released her second full-length studio album, Stages. It released four singles; "Take You Home", "One More Red Light", "If My Heart Had a Heart", and "I've Been Good".

On October 15, 2021, Pope released her third full-length studio album, Thrive. Two singles were released from the album; "What the Stars See" featuring Karen Fairchild and Lindsay Ell, and "Say It First".

=== 2022–present: Return to pop-punk and Hereditary ===
In December 2022, Pope said that she was leaving country music and going back to her roots in pop-punk, and collaborated with Levi Hummon on the song "RSVP". She says that "RSVP" is "a great bridge for what I did before and where I'm headed with my next solo project." About her return to the genre she says, "This next project has an authenticity that I've never been able to tap into before now," "Pop and rock music is such a staple in my creativity so to fully return back that genre feels special and like coming back home."

Her new single "People That I Love Leave" was released on April 14, 2023. On June 10, 2023, Pope performed the National Anthem at Game 4 of the 2023 Stanley Cup Final. Pope released another single "Almost There" in July 2023. The song was inspired by her boyfriend Sam Palladio.

On October 13, 2023, Pope released a re-recording of "Wasting All These Tears", changing the style of the song from country to pop-punk, and marking the 10-year anniversary of the song's original 2013 release. The third single from her first full-length pop-punk project, "Eye Contact", was released in March 2024.

In February 2024, Pope revealed on an interview with Rolling Stone explaining her decision to leave country music and that part of the reason was due to the racist and sexist politics that were associated with the genre. In May 2024, she announced the upcoming release of her fourth studio album, Hereditary, and released its fourth single, "Three of Us".

== Acting ==
In the 2020s, Pope started performing Off-Broadway including starring as Rose in Titanique. In 2025, she starred in Rolling Thunder which closed September 7, 2025.

== Personal life ==
In January 2010, Pope began dating drummer Rian Dawson, who is a member of the band All Time Low. They became engaged in February 2017. In July 2017, it was announced that the couple had ended their relationship.

Pope was in a relationship with British actor and musician Sam Palladio from December 2017 to 2024. In July 2026, reports emerged that Pope and fellow singer Maren Morris had appeared to publicly confirm a romantic relationship after the pair shared affectionate posts on social media.

== Influences ==
When it comes to Pope's influences she has said "I'm all over the place. I tend to go backwards a little bit and listen to Natalie Imbruglia's Left of the Middle and old Shania, Michelle Branch, Avril, Blink 182…I'm kind of all over the board. And then more recently I'm into the new Blake Shelton album, not gonna lie. Hunter Hayes and Taylor Swift."

== Filmography ==
=== Television ===
Year	Title	Role	Notes
2009	Degrassi Goes Hollywood	Herself	Television film
2010	Hellcats	Herself	Episode: "Nobody Loves Me But My Mother"
2012	The Voice	Herself	Artist / Winner (Season 3)
2016	Lip Sync Battle	Herself	Episode: "Cassadee Pope vs. Dustin Lynch"
2017	Nashville	Herself	Episode: "'Til I Can Make It on My Own"
2018	Audience Music	Herself	Episode: "Cassadee Pope"
2022	Name That Tune	Herself	Episode: "Country Divas and Spicy Stars of The Stage"

== Discography ==
=== Studio albums ===
Title	Album details	Peak chart positions					Sales
Title	Album details	US Country	US	US Indie	CAN	UK Country	Sales
Frame by Frame	Release date: October 8, 2013; Label: Republic Nashville; Formats: CD, digital download	1	9	—	16	3	US: 181,000
Stages	Release date: February 1, 2019; Label: Awake Music; Format: Digital download	39	— (Note: Stages did not enter the Billboard 200, but did chart at number 81 on the Top Album Sales component chart that tracks physical and digital albums sales.)	7	—	—	US: 2,300
Thrive	Release date: October 15, 2021; Label: Awake Music; Format: Digital download	—	—	—	—	—	
Hereditary	Release date: July 12, 2024; Label: Awake Music; Format: Digital download, LP	—	—	—	—	—	
"—" denotes a recording that failed to chart or was ineligible for that chart.

=== Extended plays ===
Title	Album details	Peak chart positions		
Title	Album details	US Country	US	US Heat
Cassadee Pope	Release date: May 22, 2012; Label: Self-released; Formats: Extended play	—	—	25
Summer	Release date: June 3, 2016; Label: Republic Nashville; Formats: Extended play	14	164	—
Rise and Shine	Release date: August 7, 2020; Label: Awake Music; Format: Digital download	—	—	13
"—" denotes items which failed to chart.

=== Singles ===
Single	Year	Peak chart positions					Sales	Certifications (sales threshold)	Album
Single	Year	US Country	US Country Airplay	US	CAN Country	CAN	Sales	Certifications (sales threshold)	Album
"Wasting All These Tears"	2013	5	10	37	26	41	US: 1,013,000	RIAA: Platinum	Frame by Frame
"I Wish I Could Break Your Heart"	2014	35	32	—	—	—	US: 92,000		Frame by Frame
"I Am Invincible"	2015	—	52	—	—	—	US: 22,000		Non-album single
"Think of You" (with Chris Young)	2016	2	1	40	1	57	US: 513,000	RIAA: Platinum; MC: Platinum	I'm Comin' Over
"Summer"	2016	—	55	—	—	—			Summer
"Take You Home"	2018	49	—	—	—	—			Stages
"One More Red Light"	2018	—	— (Note: "One More Red Light" did not enter the Billboard Country Airplay chart, but reached number 54 on the Country Indicator airplay chart that employs the same methodology with an alternate panel of reporting stations.)	—	—	—			Stages
"If My Heart Had a Heart"	2019	—	—	—	—	—			Stages
"I've Been Good"	2019	—	—	—	—	—			Stages
"What the Stars See" (featuring Karen Fairchild and Lindsay Ell)	2021	—	—	—	—	—			Thrive
"Say It First"	2021	—	—	—	—	—			Thrive
"People That I Love Leave" (solo or featuring Jax)	2023	—	—	—	—	—			Hereditary
"Almost There"	2023	—	—	—	—	—			Hereditary
"Eye Contact"	2024	—	—	—	—	—			Hereditary
"Three of Us"	2024	—	—	—	—	—			Hereditary
"—" denotes items which failed to chart or was not released to that territory.

=== Promotional singles ===
Single	Year	Peak chart positions	Album
Single	Year	US Country	Album
"You Hear a Song"	2013	44	Frame by Frame
"11"	2013	38	Frame by Frame
"Good Times"	2013	50	Frame by Frame
"Champagne"	2013	— (Note: "Champagne" did not enter the Hot Country Songs, but did chart at number 43 on the Country Digital Song Sales component chart that tracks the top downloaded country songs based on Nielsen SoundScan sales data.)	Frame by Frame
"Wasting All These Tears (Cassadee's Version)"	2023	—	Non-album single
"—" denotes items which failed to chart or was not eligible.

=== Music videos ===
Year	Video	Director	Ref.
2013	"Wasting All These Tears"	Brian Lazzaro	
2014	"I Wish I Could Break Your Heart"	Wes Edwards	
2015	"I Am Invincible"	Roman White	
2016	"Think of You" (with Chris Young)	David McClister/Trey Fanjoy	
2016	"Summer"	TK McKamy	
2018	"Take You Home"	Justin Nolan	
2020	"Sand Paper"	Unlisted	
2020	"Let Me Go"	Unlisted	
2020	"Hangover"	Unlisted	
2020	"Built This House"	Unlisted	
2020	"Hoodie"	Unlisted	
2020	"California Dreaming"	Unlisted	
2020	"Rise and Shine"	Unlisted	
2021	"What the Stars See"	Ed Pryor	
2021	"Say It First"	Ed Pryor	
2021	"Tomorrow Night"	Kamren Kennedy	
2021	"Thrive"	Kamren Kennedy	
2023	"People That I Love Leave"	Ed Pryor	
2023	"Almost There"	Ed Pryor	
2023	"Coma" (with Taylor Acorn)	Doltyn Snedden	
2023	"Wasting All These Tears (Cassadee's Version)"	Erika Rock	
2024	"Three of Us"	Unlisted	

=== Releases from The Voice ===
==== Compilation albums ====
Title	Album details	Peak chart positions	
Title	Album details	US	US Heat
The Complete Season 3 Collection	Release date: December 18, 2012; Label: Republic Records; Formats: CD, digital download	125	1

==== Singles ====
Single	Year	Peak chart positions			Sales	Album
Single	Year	US Country	US	CAN	Sales	Album
"Over You"	2012	3	25	15	US: 340,000	The Complete Season 3 Collection
"Are You Happy Now?"	2012	—	95	92		The Complete Season 3 Collection
"Stand"	2012	—	— (Note: "Stand" did not enter the Billboard Hot 100, but peaked at number 3 on the Bubbling Under Hot 100 Singles chart, which acts as a 25-song extension.)	—		The Complete Season 3 Collection
"I'm With You"	2012	—	— (Note: "I'm With You" did not enter the Billboard Hot 100, but peaked at number 11 on the Bubbling Under Hot 100 Singles chart, which acts as a 25-song extension.)	—		The Complete Season 3 Collection
"Stupid Boy"	2012	4	40	28		The Complete Season 3 Collection
"Cry"	2012	—	60	53		The Complete Season 3 Collection
"Steve McQueen" (with Blake Shelton)	2012	42	—	—		The Complete Season 3 Collection
"—" denotes items which failed to chart.

=== Guest appearances ===
Year	Artist	Album	Song	Record label
2008	The Cab	Welcome to the New Administration	"Take My Hand Machine Shop Production"	Decaydance
2009	The Cab	The Lady Luck EP	"Take My Hand (Remix)"	Decaydance, Fueled By Ramen
2011	Vonnegutt	$FREE.99	"When I Come Around"	Purple Ribbon
2011	Yellowcard	When You're Through Thinking, Say Yes (Acoustic)	"Hang You Up"	Hopeless
2011	It Boys!	Introduction	"Shy"	Hollywood Waste
2012	I See Stars	Digital Renegade	"Electric Forest"	Sumerian
2012	Yellowcard	Southern Air	"Telescope"	Hopeless
2012	All Time Low	Don't Panic and Don't Panic: It's Longer Now!	"Backseat Serenade" (backing vocals)	Hopeless
2012	All Time Low	Don't Panic and Don't Panic: It's Longer Now!	"So Long, Soldier" (backing vocals)	Hopeless
2012	I See Stars	The Hardest Mistakes – Single	"The Hardest Mistakes"	Sumerian
2015	Chris Young	I'm Comin' Over	"Think of You" (duet)	RCA Nashville
2020	Jordie Ireland and Tyron Hapi	non album singles	"Make You Mine"	Teamwrk
2020	Leaving Austin	non album singles	"American Avenue"	
2022	Levi Hummon	non album singles	"RSVP"	Reservoir
2023	Taylor Acorn	non album singles	"Coma (ft. Cassadee Pope)"	
2024	Voilà	Glass Half Empty (Part 1)	"Blind Spot"	
2025	Silverstein	Pink Moon	"Autopilot"	UNFD
2025	Cartel	Chroma - 2025	"Q&a - 2025"	Field Day Records
2025	Acceptance	Phantoms/Twenty	"Glory/Us"	Equal Vision

=== Other appearances ===
Year	Song	Album	Record label
2014	"The Animal in Me" (featuring Robin Zander)	Nashville Outlaws: A Tribute to Motley Crue	Big Machine

== Awards and nominations ==
Year	Ceremony	Category	Awards	Result
2013	American Country Awards	New Artist of the Year	Herself	Nominated
2014	CMT Music Awards	Female Video of the Year	Wasting All These Tears	Nominated
2014	CMT Music Awards	Breakthrough Video of the Year	Wasting All These Tears	Won
2014	American Country Countdown Awards	Female Vocalist of the Year	Herself	Nominated
2016	People's Choice Awards	Favorite Female Country Artist	Herself	Nominated
2017	Grammy Award	Best Country Duo/Group Performance (with Chris Young)	Think of You	Nominated
2018	Taste of Country Fan Choice Awards	Top Indie Artist of 2018	Herself	Won

== Tours ==
Headlining

- Solo Acoustic Tour (2012) with Stephen Jerzak, Justin Young, and Darling Parade
- CMT Next Women of Country Tour (2019) with Clare Dunn and Hannah Ellis

Supporting

- Live & Loud Tour (2013) with Rascal Flatts & The Band Perry
- Crop Circles and Tractor Beams Tour (2014) with Dean Brody
- Sundown Heaven Town Tour (2014) with Tim McGraw & Kip Moore
- Riser Tour (2014) with Dierks Bentley & Randy Houser
- Southern Style Tour (2015) with Darius Rucker & David Nail
- I'm Comin' Over World Tour (2016) with Chris Young
- GIRL: The World Tour (2019) with Maren Morris
- The Force of Nature Tour (2024) with Marianas Trench

== Notes ==
Awards and achievements
Preceded by Jermaine Paul	The Voice (American); Winner; 2012 (Fall)	Succeeded by Danielle Bradbery
Preceded by "I Believe I Can Fly"	The Voice (American); Winner's song "Cry"; 2012 (Fall)	Succeeded by Born To Fly
