= Miles and Miles =

Studio album by Stephen Jerzak
- Released: June 14, 2011
- Genre: Dance-pop
- Length: 40:06
- Label: Universal Republic
- Producer: Josh Abraham; John Fields; Ian Kirkpatrick; The Matrix; Mark Maxwell; Oligee; Matt Squire

Stephen Jerzak chronology
My Uke Has a Crush On You (2010)	Miles and Miles (2011)	The Nashville Sessions (with Jamestown Story) (2012)

Singles from Stephen Jerzak
- 1. "She Said" Released: June 13, 2010; 2. "Party Like You're Single" Released: July 1, 2011

Professional ratings
Review scores
Source	Rating
AllMusic	2/5 stars

Miles and Miles is the major label debut studio album by American electropop and acoustic-pop singer Stephen Jerzak. It was released on June 14, 2011. It was preceded by the lead single, "She Said" featuring Leighton Meester which was released on July 13, 2010. The second single was released along its music video directed by Amy Lynn Straub on July 1, 2011. On March 12, 2013 some unreleased songs that didn't made into the album's final tracklisting along multiple remixes of the first single "She Said" were released on Jerzak's BandPage account under a mixtape called Miles and Miles B-Side.

== Composition ==
The album's sound has been described as "Radio Disney dance-pop", noted to be influenced by both Owl City's electropop and Never Shout Never's teen folk. The record also explores "a more full-fledged pop sound", compared to Jerzak's previous works.

== Track listing ==
Credits taken from Tidal.

No.	Title	Writer(s)	Producer(s)	Length
1.	"Miles n' Miles"	Stephen Jerzak; Sterling Fox; Daniel Omelio	Ian Kirkpatrick	3:15
2.	"Stood Me Up"	Jerzak; John Fields	Fields	2:52
3.	"Party Like You're Single"	Jerzak; Scott Harris; James Patterson; Benjamin Ruttner	Josh Abraham; Oligee	3:17
4.	"Cute"	Jerzak	Kirkpatrick	3:00
5.	"Love is Strong"	Jerzak	Mark Maxwell	4:37
6.	"Let Your Heart Do the Talking"	Jerzak; Fields	Fields	3:06
7.	"Hot Over Summer"	Jerzak; Maxwell	Kirkpatrick	3:09
8.	"Queen"	Jerzak; Kirkpatrick; Simon Wilcox	Kirkpatrick	3:36
9.	"Next Level"	Jerzak; Matt Squire	Squire	3:08
10.	"She Said" (featuring Leighton Meester)	Jerzak; Kirkpatrick	Kirkpatrick	3:22
11.	"HA to the PPY"	Jerzak; Lauren Christy; Graham Edwards; Scott Spock	The Matrix	3:19
12.	"Peace Out"	Jerzak; Maxwell	Kirkpatrick	3:25
Total length:				40:06

== Charts ==
Chart (2011)	Peak position
US Heatseekers Albums (Billboard)	22

== Release history ==
Date	Format	Label	Ref.
June 14, 2011	CD; digital download	Universal Republic	
