= Fallout (Masked Wolf song) =

Single by Masked Wolf featuring Bring Me the Horizon
- Released: 1 April 2022
- Recorded: 2021
- Genre: Nu metal; rap rock; pop rock
- Length: 3:14
- Label: Elektra Records
- Songwriters: Harry Michael; Oliver Sykes; Jordan Fish; Hvdes; Tyron Hapi
- Producers: Tyron Hapi; Evil Twin

Masked Wolf singles chronology
"Just Names (Remix)" (2021)	"Fallout" (2022)	"Jenny, I'm Sorry" (2022)

Bring Me the Horizon singles chronology
"Maybe" (2022)	"Fallout" (2022)	"Bad Life" (2022)

Music video
- "Fallout" on YouTube

"Fallout" is a song by Australian rapper Masked Wolf featuring British rock band Bring Me the Horizon. Produced by Tyron Hapi and Evil Twin and written by Harry Michael, Oliver Sykes, Jordan Fish, Hvdes and Tyron Hapi, the song interpolates the hook of HVDES's earlier song of the same title. It was released on 1 April 2022 through Elektra Records.

== Background ==
On 29 March 2022, Bring Me the Horizon shared a cryptic post onto their TikTok account with the caption "This is the Fallout" while the band were jamming to a snippet of the song in the teaser. Masked Wolf teased on his Instagram page with a glitchy video that would reveal that he would be collaborating with Bring Me the Horizon on a new song called "Fallout" that would be slated to release on 1 April 2022.

== Composition ==
"Fallout" has been described as a nu metal, rap rock and a pop rock song by critics. It runs for three minutes and 14 seconds. Speaking to Metal Hammer about the collaboration, Masked Wolf explained:

"I haven’t done a collaboration that felt dark; I always felt that my brand had that edge of darkness to it, and I was waiting for the right opportunity to come along. When I heard Fallout, it grabbed me straight away. The way I felt like I was meant to be in the rubble but could still be brought out, that’s the feeling it gave me... To me, it’s perfectly structured and gives me the emotions I love diving deeper into when writing songs."

== Music video ==
The music video for "Fallout" was released onto YouTube on 11 April 2022.

The video stars Masked Wolf who walks into a room filled with computers. On one of the monitors, Bring Me Horizon's frontman Oli Sykes appears and the two perform the song together.

== Personnel ==
Credits adapted from Tidal.

Musicians

- Harry Michael – lead vocals, composer
- Oliver Sykes – featured vocals, composer

Additional personnel

- Tyron Hapi – producer, composer
- Evil Twin – producer
- Zakk Cervini – mixer
- Klaus Hill – mastering engineer
- Jordan Fish – composer
- Hvdes – composer

== Charts ==
Weekly chart performance for "Fallout"
Chart (2022)	Peak position
New Zealand Hot Singles (RMNZ)	40
UK Rock & Metal (OCC)	29
US Hot Hard Rock Songs (Billboard)	14
