= Wasting All These Tears =

2013 single by Cassadee Pope

Single by Cassadee Pope

from the album Frame by Frame
- Released: May 31, 2013
- Recorded: 2013
- Genre: Pop rock; country pop
- Length: 3:35
- Label: Republic Nashville
- Songwriters: Caitlyn Smith; Rollie Gaalswyk
- Producer: Dann Huff

Cassadee Pope singles chronology
"Wasting All These Tears" (2013)	"I Wish I Could Break Your Heart" (2014)

"Wasting All These Tears" is a song recorded by American singer-songwriter Cassadee Pope, written by Caitlyn Smith and Rollie Gaalswyk. It was released as Pope's debut solo single from her debut solo studio album Frame by Frame on May 31, 2013. It is the first song by Pope to reach Gold status, and has since been certified Platinum as of March 5, 2014.

== Reception ==
=== Critical reception ===
The song received mixed to favorable reviews from music critics. Billy Dukes of Taste of Country gave the single 3 stars out of 5, saying that "While enjoyable, ‘Wasting All These Tears’ exemplifies the difference between a pop-country song and a country song performed by a pop singer." Giving it 3.5 stars out of 5, Matt Bjorke of Roughstock said that "While "Wasting All These Tears" is clearly a modern Country/Pop song, there's nothing here that says that it couldn't crossover into the pop realm, something Pope and her label likely had in their minds all along. Still, despite the crossover nature of the track, Pope delivers a strong sense of attitude and connects with the lyrics and that's more than enough to suggest the birth of a potential star." It received a "B" from Jon Freeman of Country Weekly, who praised Pope's voice and said that the arrangement was "Avril Lavigne plus banjo". He thought that the song would have the potential to make Pope a breakout on The Voice. Newsday's Glenn Gamboa was also critical commenting that "Cassadee may want to claim a country base, but her vocals are still closer to Avril Lavigne than Carrie Underwood" and that "songs like "Wasting All These Tears" feel hollow and misplaced". Ben Foster of Country Universe wrote of the song, "The didactic, heavy-handed treatment all but kills off whatever potency the song might otherwise have carried" and gave the song a C−.

=== Chart performance ===
"Wasting All These Tears" debuted at number 54 on the U.S. Billboard Country Airplay chart for the week of June 22, 2013. It also debuted at number 7 on the U.S. Billboard Hot Country Songs chart for the week of June 22, 2013. It also debuted at number 37 on the U.S. Billboard Hot 100 chart for the week of June 22, 2013. It also debuted at number 41 on the Canadian Hot 100 chart for the week of June 22, 2013. In its first week, "Wasting All These Tears" sold 125,000 copies. According to roughstock, the single has sold 1,013,000 copies as of 2 April 2014.

== Music video ==
The music video was directed by Brian Lazzaro and premiered on CMT on July 17, 2013.

== Track listing ==
Digital download

- "Wasting All These Tears" – 3:35

== Chart performance ==
Chart (2013–2014)	Peak position
Canada Hot 100 (Billboard)	41
Canada Country (Billboard)	26
US Billboard Hot 100	37
US Hot Country Songs (Billboard)	5
US Country Airplay (Billboard)	10

=== Year-end charts ===
Chart (2013)	Position
US Country Airplay (Billboard)	100
US Hot Country Songs (Billboard)	49

Chart (2014)	Position
US Country Airplay (Billboard)	66
US Hot Country Songs (Billboard)	59

== Certifications ==
Region	Certification	Certified units/sales
United States (RIAA)	Platinum	1,013,000

== Awards and nominations ==
Year	Ceremony	Category	Result
2014	CMT Music Awards	Female Video of the Year	Nominated
2014	CMT Music Awards	Breakthrough Video of the Year	Won

== Release history ==
Country	Date	Format
United Kingdom	June 4, 2013	Digital download
Canada	May 31, 2013	Digital download
United States	May 31, 2013	Digital download

== "Wasting All These Tears (Cassadee's Version)" ==
"Wasting All These Tears (Cassadee's Version)"

Single by Cassadee Pope
- Released: October 13, 2023
- Genre: Pop punk
- Length: 3:30
- Label: Awake Music
- Songwriters: Caitlyn Smith; Rollie Gaalswyk
- Producers: Alex Lipshaw; Cassadee Pope

Cassadee Pope singles chronology
"Coma" (2023)	"Wasting All These Tears (Cassadee's Version)" (2023)

The re-recorded version of the song was released on October 13, 2023, with more prominent electric guitars and upbeat drums, as part of Cassadee's return to the pop punk genre.
