= Astronaut in the Ocean =

2019 single by Masked Wolf

Single by Masked Wolf

from the album Astronomical
- Released: 7 June 2019
- Recorded: 2019
- Genre: Pop-rap; trap; rap rock
- Length: 2:12
- Label: Teamwrk; Elektra
- Songwriters: Tyron Hapi; Harry Michael
- Producer: Hapi

Masked Wolf singles chronology
"Numb" (2019)	"Astronaut in the Ocean" (2019)	"Evil on the Inside" (2019)

Music video
- "Astronaut in the Ocean" on YouTube

"Astronaut in the Ocean" is a song by Australian rapper Masked Wolf. It was released in June 2019. the song became a sleeper hit in 2021 and achieved major success, peaking at number four on the Australian ARIA Charts and number six on the US Billboard Hot 100. It was released as the lead single from his mixtape Astronomical. The song was produced by Tyron Hapi.

In September 2021, the song was added to the APRA billion streams list for its achievement. At the 2021 ARIA Music Awards, the song was nominated for Song of the Year, Best Hip Hop Release and Breakthrough Artist – Release. Masked Wolf was nominated for Best Artist and Daniele Cernera was nominated for Best Video for their work on this release. About the lyrics, the rapper said, "'Astronaut in the Ocean' touches on mental depression, how I was stuck in a place of anxiety and feeling low."

== Release ==
The song was first released through Teamwrk Records on 8 June 2019, achieving minor success within Australia and becoming Masked Wolf's most popular single at the time. However, in late 2020, the track started to gain attention on social media by being used in a number of twitter videos. He was signed by Elektra Records in early 2021, and the song was re-released on 6 January 2021. By that time, the song had already reached more than 32 million streams on Spotify and was steadily gaining more traction through social media and clips on TikTok.

In February 2021, it surpassed the 100 million Spotify streams mark, becoming Teamwrk Records' most streamed track. The song was also included in the playlist "The Shazam Predictions 2021", compiled by Shazam and Apple Music.

== Remixes ==
The song has received many remixes, including that of Brazilian DJ Alok. The official remix features American rappers G-Eazy and DDG, and was released on May 7, 2021.

== Music video ==
The "Astronaut in the Ocean" music video was directed by Daniele Cernera, who also served as the director of photography, and 1st AC Sophian Ferey. The video was produced by Cerne Studios, based in Sydney, Australia and filmed at their studio in Sydney in under half a day.

The team at Cerne Studios used retro projection on a cyclorama to create the visual effects of space. The lighting design included an overhead softbox for backlight and ambient light, as well as RGB tubes for added colour saturation. For the second set, a black backdrop and warm spotlight were used to create a smoky, ethereal look. The CGI effects were added by 180 Creative in Melbourne during the post-production process. The video premiered on October 27, 2020.

The video received widespread recognition for its creative and high-quality production value, with over 350 million views on YouTube and 2+ billion plays on digital platforms. It was nominated for ARIA Award 2021 for Best Video.

== Charts ==
=== Weekly charts ===
2021 weekly chart performance for "Astronaut in the Ocean"
Chart (2021)	Peak position
Australia (ARIA)	4
Austria (Ö3 Austria Top 40)	2
Belgium (Ultratop 50 Flanders)	26
Belgium (Ultratop 50 Wallonia)	24
Bulgaria Airplay (PROPHON)	5
Canada (Canadian Hot 100)	5
CIS Airplay (TopHit)	2
Croatia International Airplay (Top lista)	73
Czech Republic Airplay (ČNS IFPI)	69
Czech Republic Singles Digital (ČNS IFPI)	1
Denmark (Tracklisten)	20
Finland (Suomen virallinen lista)	3
France (SNEP)	29
Germany (GfK)	4
Global 200 (Billboard)	3
Greece International (IFPI)	1
Hungary (Dance Top 40)	8
Hungary (Single Top 40)	1
Hungary (Stream Top 40)	1
Iceland (Tónlistinn)	38
India International (IMI)	1
Ireland (IRMA)	14
Italy (FIMI)	33
Lebanon Airplay (Lebanese Top 20)	5
Lithuania (AGATA)	1
Malaysia (RIM)	12
Mexico Airplay (Billboard)	5
Netherlands (Dutch Top 40)	14
Netherlands (Single Top 100)	7
New Zealand (Recorded Music NZ)	6
Norway (VG-lista)	10
Poland Airplay (ZPAV)	23
Poland (Polish Airplay TV)	2
Portugal (AFP)	3
Romania (Airplay 100)	1
Russia Airplay (TopHit)	1
Singapore (RIAS)	11
Slovakia Airplay (ČNS IFPI)	29
Slovakia (Singles Digitál Top 100)	1
South Africa (RISA)	19
Spain (Promusicae)	87
Sweden (Sverigetopplistan)	16
Switzerland (Schweizer Hitparade)	4
Ukraine Airplay (TopHit)	13
UK Singles (Official Charts)	12
UK Hip Hop/R&B (Official Charts)	4
US Billboard Hot 100	6
US Adult Pop Airplay (Billboard)	27
US Hot R&B/Hip-Hop Songs (Billboard)	3
US Pop Airplay (Billboard)	8
US Rhythmic (Billboard)	3
Venezuela (Record Report)	50

2022 weekly chart performance for "Astronaut in the Ocean"
Chart (2022)	Peak position
CIS Airplay (TopHit)	62
Russia Airplay (TopHit)	63
Slovakia Airplay (ČNS IFPI)	93
Ukraine Airplay (TopHit)	26

2023 weekly chart performance for "Astronaut in the Ocean"
Chart (2023)	Peak position
Belarus Airplay (TopHit)	37
CIS Airplay (TopHit)	103
Kazakhstan Airplay (TopHit)	125
Romania Airplay (TopHit)	91
Russia Airplay (TopHit)	159
Ukraine Airplay (TopHit)	58

2024 weekly chart performance for "Astronaut in the Ocean"
Chart (2024)	Peak position
Belarus Airplay (TopHit)	172
Romania Airplay (TopHit)	115
Ukraine Airplay (TopHit)	60

2025 weekly chart performance for "Astronaut in the Ocean"
Chart (2025)	Peak position
Belarus Airplay (TopHit)	161
Kazakhstan Airplay (TopHit)	72

=== Monthly charts ===
2021 monthly chart performance for "Astronaut in the Ocean"
Chart (2021)	Peak position
CIS Airplay (TopHit)	2
Czech Republic (Rádio Top 100)	71
Czech Republic (Singles Digitál Top 100)	1
Russia Airplay (TopHit)	1
Slovakia (Rádio Top 100)	37
Slovakia (Singles Digitál Top 100)	1
Ukraine Airplay (TopHit)	14

2022 monthly chart performance for "Astronaut in the Ocean"
Chart (2022)	Peak position
CIS Airplay (TopHit)	66
Russia Airplay (TopHit)	81
Ukraine Airplay (TopHit)	39

2023 monthly chart performance for "Astronaut in the Ocean"
Chart (2023)	Peak position
Belarus Airplay (TopHit)	64
Ukraine Airplay (TopHit)	82

=== Year-end charts ===
2021 year-end chart performance for "Astronaut in the Ocean"
Chart (2021)	Position
Australia (ARIA)	12
Austria (Ö3 Austria Top 40)	19
Belgium (Ultratop Flanders)	85
Belgium (Ultratop Wallonia)	37
Brazil Streaming (Pro-Música Brasil)	132
Bulgaria Airplay (PROPHON)	9
Canada (Canadian Hot 100)	14
CIS Airplay (TopHit)	7
Denmark (Tracklisten)	55
France (SNEP)	79
Germany (Official German Charts)	15
Global 200 (Billboard)	14
Hungary (Dance Top 40)	82
Hungary (Single Top 40)	11
Hungary (Stream Top 40)	12
Iceland (Tónlistinn)	47
India International (IMI)	7
Ireland (IRMA)	50
Netherlands (Dutch Top 40)	97
Netherlands (Single Top 100)	43
New Zealand (Recorded Music NZ)	20
Norway (VG-lista)	31
Portugal (AFP)	37
Russia Airplay (TopHit)	10
Sweden (Sverigetopplistan)	52
Switzerland (Schweizer Hitparade)	16
Ukraine Airplay (TopHit)	46
UK Singles (OCC)	41
US Billboard Hot 100	20
US Hot R&B/Hip-Hop Songs (Billboard)	3
US Hot Rap Songs (Billboard)	2
US Mainstream Top 40 (Billboard)	31
US Rhythmic (Billboard)	21

2022 year-end chart performance for "Astronaut in the Ocean"
Chart (2022)	Position
Belgium (Ultratop 50 Wallonia)	177
CIS Airplay (TopHit)	78
Global 200 (Billboard)	127
Russia Airplay (TopHit)	114
Ukraine Airplay (TopHit)	71

2023 year-end chart performance for "Astronaut in the Ocean"
Chart (2023)	Position
Belarus Airplay (TopHit)	129
Ukraine Airplay (TopHit)	82

=== Decade-end charts ===
20s Decade-end chart performance for "Astronaut in the Ocean"
Chart (2020–2025)	Position
Belarus Airplay (TopHit)	16
CIS Airplay (TopHit)	24
Kazakhstan Airplay (TopHit)	177
Romania Airplay (TopHit)	34
Russia Airplay (TopHit)	42
Ukraine Airplay (TopHit)	70

== Certifications ==
Certifications for "Astronaut in the Ocean"
Region	Certification	Certified units/sales
Australia (ARIA)	3× Platinum	210,000^{‡}
Austria (IFPI Austria)	2× Platinum	60,000^{‡}
Brazil (Pro-Música Brasil)	3× Platinum	120,000^{‡}
Brazil (Pro-Música Brasil) Alok remix	Gold	20,000^{‡}
Denmark (IFPI Danmark)	Platinum	90,000^{‡}
France (SNEP)	Diamond	333,333^{‡}
Germany (BVMI)	Platinum	400,000^{‡}
Italy (FIMI)	Platinum	70,000^{‡}
New Zealand (RMNZ)	4× Platinum	120,000^{‡}
Poland (ZPAV)	4× Platinum	200,000^{‡}
Portugal (AFP)	Platinum	10,000^{‡}
Spain (Promusicae)	Gold	30,000^{‡}
United Kingdom (BPI)	Platinum	600,000^{‡}
United States (RIAA)	2× Platinum	2,000,000^{‡}
^{‡} Sales+streaming figures based on certification alone.

== See also ==
- List of Airplay 100 number ones of the 2020s
