= Rise and Shine (EP) =

EP by Cassadee Pope
- Released: August 7, 2020
- Genre: Country pop
- Length: 27:12
- Label: Awake Music
- Producer: Todd Lombardo; Cassadee Pope

Cassadee Pope chronology
| Stages (2019) | Rise and Shine (2020) | Thrive (2021) |

Rise and Shine is the third EP by American singer and songwriter Cassadee Pope, released on August 7, 2020 through Awake Music. Pope co-wrote all eight of the tracks and also co-produced the record with Todd Lombardo, both firsts in her solo career.

== Recording ==
Rise and Shine includes a cover of "Hangover", originally recorded by Pope's band Hey Monday on their 2010 extended play, Beneath It All. The other seven songs were written in 2017 but were not recorded in full until 2020 during the COVID-19 pandemic. Pope's boyfriend, actor and musician Sam Palladio, is featured as a backing vocalist on "California Dreaming". The album is recorded acoustically to showcase the song's messages. "I wanted people to hear these in their purest form so I went with a more stripped back sound that really lets the lyrics stand out," Pope told MusicRow.

== Promotion ==
Pope announced the release of the album on June 22, 2020. "Let Me Go" and "Built This House" were released to online music stores and music streaming services on June 26. Two more songs - "Hoodie" and "Counting on the Weather" - were then released July 17, 2020. Pope hosted virtual release parties for the lyric video of "Let Me Go" and "Hoodie", respectively, on June 25 and July 16. A lyric video for the title track premiered August 6, 2020 one day ahead of the album's release.

== Critical reception ==
Rianna Turner of Forbes wrote that the acoustic format "puts [Pope's] flexible voice front-and-center," and that Pope's vocal performance is "marked by its clarity." Markos Papadatos of Digital Journal gave the song an "A" rating and wrote that Pope's "voice is crystalline and heavenly on this organic record."

== Track listing ==
| No. | Title | Writer(s) | Length |
|---|---|---|---|
| 1. | "Let Me Go" | Cassadee Pope; Tina Parol; Kevin Rudolph | 3:26 |
| 2. | "Hoodie" | Pope; Johan Fransson; Emily Weisband | 3:01 |
| 3. | "California Dreaming" (featuring Sam Palladio) | Pope; Alex Kline; Shane Stevens | 3:39 |
| 4. | "Counting on the Weather" | Pope; Bobby Huff; Blair Daly | 3:30 |
| 5. | "Hangover" | Pope; Butch Walker | 3:09 |
| 6. | "Rise and Shine" | Pope; Danny Orton; Matt Scannell | 3:40 |
| 7. | "Sand Paper" | Pope; Kline; Stevens | 3:33 |
| 8. | "Built This House" | Pope; Forest Glen Whitehead; Kelly Archer | 3:14 |
| Total length: | | | 27:12 |

== Chart performance ==
| Chart (2020) | Peak position |
|---|---|
| UK Country Albums (OCC) | 13 |
| US Current Album Sales (Billboard) | 82 |
