= Stages (Cassadee Pope album) =

stages

Studio album by Cassadee Pope
- Released: February 1, 2019
- Genre: Country pop
- Length: 33:53
- Label: Awake Music
- Producer: Corey Crowder

Cassadee Pope chronology
| Summer (2016) | stages (2019) | Rise and Shine (2020) |

Singles from stages
- 1. "Take You Home" Released: March 30, 2018; 2. "One More Red Light" Released: August 10, 2018; 3. "If My Heart Had a Heart" Released: January 31, 2019; 4. "I've Been Good" Released: August 2, 2019

Stages (stylized in all lowercase) is the second studio album by American country music singer and songwriter Cassadee Pope, released on February 1, 2019, through Awake Music. Pope co-wrote 7 of the 11 tracks on the album produced by Corey Crowder.

== Recording ==
About writing and recording for the new album, Pope stated: "I really don’t know how I would have moved on with my life without this album. In the past, I made records I thought everyone could relate to. This time, I didn’t think about that at all. I wanted to tell a story of my truths and perspective on how I approached life in hopes that the messages reach someone who may need help in their own stumble."

Guest vocals are provided by Shay Mooney (of Dan + Shay) on "If My Heart Had a Heart" and RaeLynn, Lauren Alaina, and Lindsay Ell on "Distracted."

== Promotion ==
On November 30, 2018, Pope was announced as the headliner during the CMT Next Women of Country Tour with guests Clare Dunn and Hannah Ellis starting in April 2019. On January 17, 2019, Pope announced she would be joining the US leg of country singer Maren Morris' GIRL: The World Tour as a supporting act to promote her album.

== Commercial performance ==
As of February 2019 the album has sold 2,300 copies in the US.

== Track listing ==
| No. | Title | Writer(s) | Length |
|---|---|---|---|
| 1. | "Take You Home" | Paul DiGiovanni; Ben Hayslip; Emily Weisband | 3:19 |
| 2. | "One More Red Light" | Cassadee Pope; Kelly Archer; Emily Shackleton | 3:30 |
| 3. | "How I Feel Right Now" | Pope; Sarah Buxton; Corey Crowder | 3:07 |
| 4. | "Bring Me Down Town" | Pope; Buxton; Crowder; Jared Mullins | 2:33 |
| 5. | "If My Heart Had a Heart" | Hannah Ellis; Josh Kerr; Matt McGinn | 3:22 |
| 6. | "FYI" | Pope; Blake Hubbard; Jarrod Ingram; Maghan Kabir | 3:24 |
| 7. | "Distracted" | Pope; Crowder | 2:48 |
| 8. | "Gavi" | Jason Gaviati | 1:29 |
| 9. | "Don't Ask Me" | Pope; Crowder; Zach Abend; Cale Dodds | 3:19 |
| 10. | "Still Got It" | Pope; Shackleton; Victoria Banks | 3:34 |
| 11. | "I've Been Good" | Andy Albert; Marc Beeson; Jordan Walker | 3:28 |
| Total length: | | | 33:53 |

== Personnel ==
Performers

- Cassadee Pope - lead vocals
- Shay Mooney - background vocals (track 5)
- RaeLynn - background vocals (track 7)
- Lauren Alaina - background vocals (track 7)
- Lindsay Ell - background vocals (track 7)

== Charts ==
| Chart (2019) | Peak position |
|---|---|
| US Independent Albums (Billboard) | 7 |
| US Top Album Sales (Billboard) | 81 |
| US Top Country Albums (Billboard) | 39 |

== Release history ==
| Region | Date | Format(s) | Label |
|---|---|---|---|
| Various | February 1, 2019 | CD; digital download | Awake Music |
