= Jamestown Story =

American band

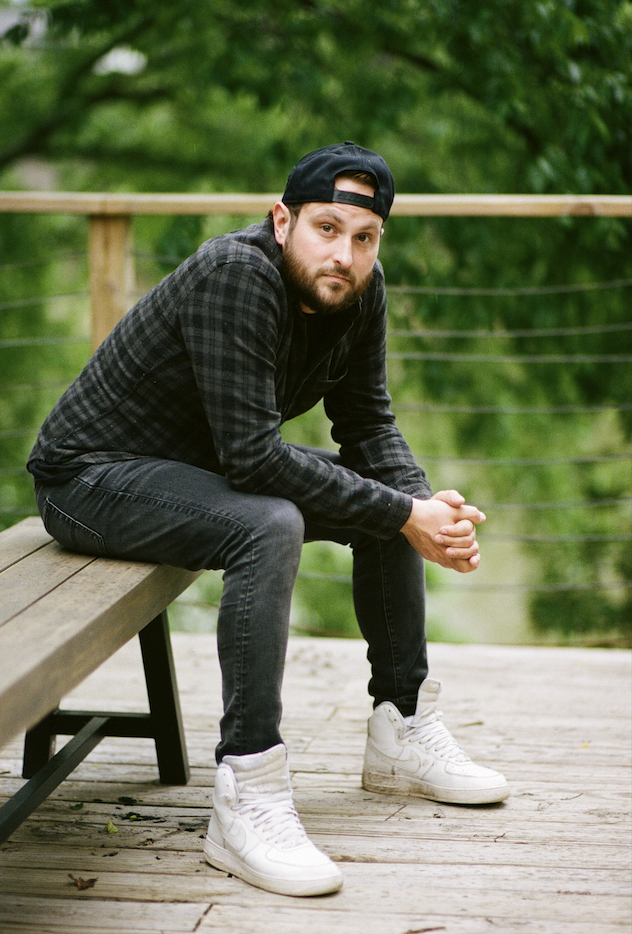
- Dane Schmidt

Background information
- Also known as: And Then I Turned Seven (2003–2007)
- Origin: Duluth, Minnesota
- Genres: Acoustic pop, alternative rock
- Years active: 2003–present
- Members: Dane Schmidt
- Past members: Pat Tarnowski; Kieren Smith; Chris Lee; Chad Snell; Sam Dean; Trevor MacKenzie; Brandyn Anderson
- Website: jamestownstory.com

Jamestown Story is an American acoustic-based music project created by Dane Schmidt, a singer-songwriter from Minneapolis, Minnesota. Schmidt released his first album under the name And Then I Turned Seven in late 2003 and has since released 7 albums as well as singles and EP's as Jamestown Story. As an A&R, Schmidt signed songwriters Jordan Schmidt, Zach Kale, along with artists Gabby Barrett, Mitchell Tenpenny, The Band Camino, Kameron Marlowe, and Adam Doleac. He resides in Nashville, TN.

== History ==
=== 2003–2007: Formation and early years ===
Schmidt released his first album, Broken Summer, under the moniker And Then I Turned Seven in August 2003 before leaving his hometown of Duluth, Minnesota, to attend college at Moorhead State University. While at school, Schmidt started playing shows in the Moorhead, Minnesota, and Fargo, North Dakota, area to promote his music. He ended up leaving Moorhead State University after his first semester to attend community college in Duluth while focusing on his music. In the fall of 2004 Schmidt put Broken Summer up for stream on PureVolume, a fast-growing music website, and quickly became one of the site's top unsigned artists. Jamestown Story has since had over 2,500,000 million plays on PureVolume. In late 2004 he decided to take time off from college to start touring and focus on his music full-time. After two solo tours on the East Coast and in the South, he recruited local musicians Pat Tarnowski, Kieren Smith, Trevor McKenzie, and Indianapolis, Indiana-based drummer Chris Lee to join the band. The band independently played over 100 shows in 2005. The band started working on their EP titled The Jamestown Story in the fall of 2005 with producer/engineer Jordan Schmidt, who has since recorded all of Jamestown Story's music. The EP was released on October 30, 2005, and soon after, McKenzie left the band. McKenzie was replaced by local musician Sam Dean while the band continued to tour the US before putting their music on the popular social networking site Myspace in early 2006. Jamestown Story has since received over 12,000,000 plays on Myspace. In the spring of 2006, Dean left the band and was replaced by Chad Snell. The band continued to tour independently, playing more than 100 shows before changing the name to Jamestown Story on January 1, 2007. After a series of difficult tours in 2007, Tarnowski, Snell and Lee left the band in the spring of 2007.

=== 2007–2008: One Last Breath and Sing It Loud ===
Schmidt and Smith started working on the band's next release, One Last Breath while Smith simultaneously recorded an EP for his new project, Sing It Loud. After signing with music distributor Tunecore, One Last Breath was released on August 9, 2007, along with "Sing It Loud"'s self-titled EP, which Schmidt played drums on. Schmidt became the band's drummer and they both moved to Minneapolis, Minnesota, where Sing It Loud signed with Epitaph Records in early 2008. Soon after the signing, Smith left Jamestown Story to focus on Sing It Loud and shortly thereafter Schmidt left Sing It Loud to focus on Jamestown Story full-time. In the spring of 2008 Jamestown Story's song "In Loving Memory" was featured on the TV show One Tree Hill. Schmidt released The Prologue EP on May 25, 2008 before starting to work on his next full-length album. On August 19, 2008, "In Loving Memory" was featured on ABC's The Secret Life of the American Teenager. Schmidt released Love vs. Life, his first solo album as Jamestown Story. The album eventually sold over 70,000 songs on iTunes, received millions of plays on Myspace, and had songs featured on Dr. Phil, Jersey Shore, The Real World, Keeping Up with the Kardashians, 16 & Pregnant, True Life, I Used To Be Fat, The Challenge, Bad Girls Club, 90210, Bad Sex, and Couples Therapy.

=== 2009–2011 ===
Schmidt continued to promote and sell his music independently throughout 2009, releasing a split EP on July 9, 2009, with fellow Myspace artist Stephen Jerzak, as well as the Never Enough EP on December 28, 2009. In late 2009 Schmidt met Brandyn Anderson, a local Minneapolis-based musician, and the two began playing Jamestown Story shows as a duo. Anderson officially joined in 2010 and the two started writing for the next release before heading to Yuigahama Beach, Japan on August 6, 2010, to play two shows. After returning to the US, Schmidt and Anderson continued working on their next release with Jordan Schmidt, which was recorded at Onkio Haus in Ginza, Tokyo. The album, Find A Way, was independently released on January 11, 2011. Their song "Ashamed" was featured on an episode of Jersey Shore that originally aired on September 1, 2011. The album has since had songs featured on The Challenge: Rivals, Keeping Up with the Kardashians, Bad Girls Club, Teen Mom, Life Unexpected, Virgin Territory, Are You the One?, The Challenge: Rivals II, Best Ink, The Real World, and the video game Rollercoaster Dreams. On November 24, 2011, Jamestown Story released an EP titled A Walk Through Time before Schmidt decided to move to Nashville, Tennessee.

=== 2012–present ===
Schmidt moved to Nashville on January 2, 2012, and started writing for the band's next release. Schmidt made frequent writing trips back to Minneapolis to work with Anderson before they began recording the album in March 2012. They released another split EP with Stephen Jerzak on August 28, 2012, titled The Nashville Sessions before Anderson parted ways with the band. On September 9, 2012, the song "I'll Help Get You Through" was featured on episodes of Dr. Phil. Schmidt continued to write and record throughout the rest of 2012 and the album Show Me Tomorrow was released on December 12, 2012. Throughout 2013, Schmidt wrote and recorded with numerous Nashville songwriters and released an EP of those songs titled Jamestown Story & Friends on September 9, 2013. The day before, Schmidt released a single song and video for "Who I Am" which focuses on suicide and depression. On September 9, 2013, Schmidt released the Jamestown Story & Friends EP. On November 11, 2013, he re-released a Christmas album titled A Jamestown Story Christmas. On July 29, 2016, Jamestown Story released its latest EP, Flashbacks.

- On July 10, 2013, the song "Nothing's Forever" was featured on an episode of The Challenge: Rivals II.
- On September 18, 2013, the song "Scarred" was featured on an episode of The Challenge: Rivals II.
- On April 1, 2014, the song "Falling feat. Corey Wagar" was featured on an episode of The Real World: Ex-Plosion.
- On January 20, 2015, the song "Barefoot and Bruised" was featured on an episode of The Challenge: Battle of the Exes II.

== Members ==
=== Current ===
- Dane Schmidt – lead vocals, acoustic guitar, piano, drums (2003–present)

=== Former ===
- Brandyn Anderson – piano (2010–2012)
- Kieren Smith – violin, guitar (2005–2008)
- Pat Tarnowski – guitar (2005–2007)
- Chris Lee – drums (2005–2007)
- Chad Snell – bass (2006–2007)
- Sam Dean – bass (2005–2006)
- Trevor MacKenzie – bass (2005)

== Discography ==
=== Albums ===
- Broken Summer (2007)
- Love vs. Life (2008)
- Find A Way (2011)
- A Walk Through Time (2011)
- A Jamestown Story Christmas (2012)
- Show Me Tomorrow (2012)
- Flashbacks (2016)

=== EPs ===
==== Solo ====
- The Jamestown Story (2005)
- One Last Breath (2007)
- The Prologue (2008)
- Never Enough (2009)
- Jamestown Story & Friends (2013)
- The Recollection (2017)

==== Split EPs ====
- Stephen Jerzak & Jamestown Story EP (2009)
- The Nashville Sessions (2012)
- Hard Days EP (2013)

=== Compilations ===
- A Collection Of Covers (2011)
- The EP Collection (2011)
- Spotify Collection (2013)

== Articles ==
Date	Title	Publication
Jun 2023	Dane Schmidt Talks His Journey Leading To One Year Of Daschent [Interview]	MusicRow
Jun 2022	Dane Schmidt Launches New Creative Management Company, Daschent	MusicRow
Jun 2022	Dane Schmidt Launches New Venture Daschent	Country Insider
May 2020	Sony/ATV Nashville Signs Gabby Barrett to Worldwide Deal	MusicBusiness Worldwide
Jun 2022	Sony Music Publishing's Dane Schmidt Leaving To Launch New Company	All Access
Apr 2018	Sony/ATV Beefs Up Its Creative Team	Hits Daily Double
Apr 2018	Sony/ATV Nashville Adds New Faces to A&R Team	Broadway World
