= 11 (song) =

Promotional single by Cassadee Pope

from the album Frame by Frame
- Released: August 27, 2013
- Genre: Country
- Length: 3:50
- Label: Republic Nashville
- Songwriters: Cassadee Pope, Nathan Chapman
- Producer: Dann Huff

"11" is a song by American singer-songwriter Cassadee Pope from her debut solo album, Frame by Frame (2013). Pope co-wrote the song, which tells the story of her parents' divorce, with Nathan Chapman, while the production was handled by Dann Huff.

== Background and release ==
"11" was released onto iTunes on August 27, 2013 as the second of four promotional countdown singles leading up to the album's release. A music video featuring childhood photos and clips of home videos from her family was posted on Pope's YouTube channel August 28 and on her VEVO channel on September 12, 2013.

Upon release, the song was met with generally positive reviews from music critics. It debuted at #38 on the Hot Country Songs chart, the highest debut of the promotional tracks.

== Chart performance ==
Chart (2013)	Peak position
US Hot Country Songs (Billboard)	38
US Country Digital Songs (Billboard)	19
