= Darling Parade =

- Origin: Nashville, Tennessee, U.S.
- Genres: Alternative rock Pop rock
- Years active: 2007–2015
- Label: Independent
- Members: Kristin Kearns; Nate McCoy; Dustin McCoy; Casey Conrad
- Website: darlingparade.com

Darling Parade is an American Alternative Rock band from Nashville, formed in early 2007. The band consists of Kristin Kearns (vocals/guitar), Nate McCoy (guitar/vocals), Dustin McCoy (bass/vocals), and Casey Conrad (drums). By December 5, 2011, the band were ranked at No. 8 on the Billboard Next Big Sound Chart. On May 4, 2012, their music video for "Never Wrong" was voted to the No. 1 position on The Freshmen mtvU. Their debut full-length studio album, Battle Scars & Broken Hearts was released on April 2, 2013, by Page 2 Music.

In June 2013, Darling Parade was declared the winner of the “Let’s Make a Band Famous” category at MTV and VH1’s O Music Awards, a fan-driven competition that generated more than 100 million votes across digital platforms. The victory earned the band a performance slot during MTV’s VMA Week in New York City and recognition as MTV’s “Artist to Watch.”

Prior to this achievement, the band had gained national attention through chart success and media exposure. In December 2011, Darling Parade reached No. 8 on the Billboard Next Big Sound chart, reflecting their growth in online popularity and fan engagement. Their music video for “Never Wrong” was voted No. 1 on mtvU’s The Freshmen in 2012, further increasing their visibility among college audiences.

Darling Parade’s music has been featured across multiple television networks, including ABC Family, The CW, Syfy, and Showtime, and the band appeared in Supercuts’ national “Rock the Cut” advertising campaign in 2013. They were also named Channel One’s “Artist of the Year” for 2012–2013, and received airplay on platforms such as AOL Radio and Slacker Radio.

The band released their debut full-length album, Battle Scars & Broken Hearts, on April 2, 2013, following a series of independently released EPs. Darling Parade has toured nationally, sharing the stage with artists including Fifth Harmony, Hot Chelle Rae, Trapt, Major League, 3 Pill Morning, Cassadee Pope, Chevelle, and The Red Jumpsuit Apparatus, and has performed at festivals such as Summerfest and Shout Fest.

In 2015, Darling Parade inexplicably ceased public activity as a band and entered an indefinite hiatus. As of that time, the band has not issued an official statement regarding future plans, and it remains unclear whether they intend to reunite or release new material.

== Tours ==
- Supporting act in January and February 2012 on national tour with Cassadee Pope, Stephen Jerzak, and Justin Young
- Performance at Summerfest 2012 opening for Cherri Bomb & Chevelle.
- Performed multiple shows at Shout Fest 2010 where they opened for Switchfoot, Plumb, and Sixpence None The Richer.
- Supporting act on national tour with Trapt in 2014

== Use in Film & TV ==
- Promotional Trailer for Stargate Universe on SyFy Channel (2009)
- The Lying Game – ABC Family
- Fly Girls – The CW
- Featured in SuperCuts "Rock the Cut" Ad (2013)

== Band members ==
Current

- Kristin Kearns – Lead Vocals, Rhythm Guitar
- Nate McCoy – Lead Guitar, Backing Vocals
- Dustin McCoy – Bass, Backing Vocals
- Casey Conrad – Drums

Past

- Adam Gooch
- Jonathan Davis
- Scott Adams
- Robert Fairless
- Nathan Thurston

== Discography ==
=== Studio albums ===
Year	Album	Chart positions		
Year	Album	Billboard 200	Top Heatseekers	Independent Albums
2013	Battle Scars & Broken Hearts: Release date: April 2, 2013; Label: Page 2 Music	-	77	-

=== EPs ===
- Darling Parade (self-titled) (2009)
- What You Want (2010)
- Until We Say It's Over (2011)

=== Singles ===
- "Ghost"
- "Never Wrong"
- "Crash And Burn"
- "Run Away"

== Collaborations ==
- Stephen Christian of Anberlin co-wrote and provided guest vocals on "Remember" for the band's 3rd EP, Until We Say It's Over.
