= Summer (Cassadee Pope song) =

Single by Cassadee Pope

from the album Summer
- Released: June 3, 2016
- Genre: Country pop
- Length: 3:09
- Label: Republic Nashville
- Songwriters: Cassadee Pope, Kelly Archer, Emily Shackelton
- Producer: Corey Crowder

Cassadee Pope singles chronology
"Think of You" (2016)	"Summer" (2016)	"Take You Home" (2018)

"Summer" is a song by American singer-songwriter Cassadee Pope from her second extended play, also titled Summer (2016). Pope wrote the song with Kelly Archer and Emily Shackelton. Production was handled by Corey Crowder, who also produced Pope's chart-topping collaboration with Chris Young that year, "Think of You". It serves as the EP's lead single.

The song was made available to American country radio stations on May 23, 2016, via PlayMPE and was officially sent for adds through Republic Nashville on June 6, 2016. It was released to digital retailers June 3, 2016 as part of the Summer EP.

== Reception ==
=== Critical ===
Matt Bjorke of Roughstock wrote that "Summer" is a "radio-ready" anthem with hit potential and which demonstrates how Pope has "grown into her country music career." Taste of Country and Sounds Like Nashville both praised the song as a highlight from the EP. Writing for the former, Billy Dukes praised Pope's delivery as "easy to believe."

=== Commercial ===
"Summer" debuted at number 59 on the Billboard Country Airplay chart dated June 25, 2016.

== Music video ==
The music video for "Summer" was filmed at the Opal Sands Resort, and on the Clearwater Beach Boardwalk in Clearwater Beach, FL and was directed by TK McKamy. It premiered June 3, 2016 in conjunction with the song's digital release. Inspired by events Pope experienced at age seventeen, the video recounts a summer fling between Pope and a love interest played by Sam Krumrine

== Live performances ==
Pope has performed "Summer" as part of her setlist on Chris Young's I'm Comin' Over Tour since February 25, 2016.

== Chart performance ==
Chart (2016)	Peak position
US Country Airplay (Billboard)	55
