= I Am Invincible =

Single by Cassadee Pope
- Released: July 24, 2015
- Genre: Country, pop rock
- Length: 3:32
- Label: Republic Nashville
- Songwriter(s): Brett Boyett, Nash Overstreet
- Producer(s): Julian Raymond

Cassadee Pope singles chronology
"I Wish I Could Break Your Heart" (2014)	"I Am Invincible" (2015)	"Think of You" (2016)

"I Am Invincible" is a song written by Brett Boyett and Nash Overstreet, and recorded by the American singer-songwriter Cassadee Pope for her forthcoming second studio album. It was released to digital retailers through Republic Nashville on July 24, 2015 as the album's intended lead single and impacted American country radio on September 8, 2015. Ultimately the song did not appear on Pope’s second studio album. Pope debuted the empowerment anthem at the opening ceremonies of the 2015 Special Olympics World Summer Games on July 25, 2015.

Upon its release, "I Am Invincible" received generally positive reviews from critics, who praised Pope's vocal range as well as the song's blending of country elements and the rock styling of Pope's work with Hey Monday. The song also garnered significant fan attention, reaching number four on the Billboard Twitter Real-Time chart.

== Content ==
"The song is for those people who have gone through a very tough experience and come out with a thicker skin and just take life by the horns..."

- Pope on the song's underlying message.

"I Am Invincible" is an anthemic ballad written by Brett Boyett and Nash Overstreet with a duration of three minutes and thirty-two seconds. The song begins with a spoken word dedication "For my girls, the fighters, the warriors," before transitioning into the first verse. Its lyrics convey a message of self-empowerment and surviving obstacles in one's life, with Pope affirming of the chorus that she is "invincible." Critics have noted the song's thematic similarity to recent pop anthems, including Katy Perry's "Roar" (2013) and Rachel Platten's "Fight Song" (2015). Pope related to the song's message on a personal level, but also felt the song reflected the struggles she and other female artists had been facing in finding success in country music.

Musically, the song combines elements of pop, rock, and country. It is instrumented by banjo, mandolin, guitar, and keyboard. Pope's vocals lack the twang emulated on Frame by Frame (2013), but the song follows the storytelling approach and instrumentation of modern country music. With its "heavy rock guitar" and "powerful", country-influenced vocal arrangement, the song's style was described by Marissa R. Moss of Rolling Stone Country as "Paramore-meets-Carrie Underwood." Country music blog Taste of Country also likened Pope's delivery to that of American recording artist Kelly Clarkson.

== Music video ==
The music video was directed by Roman White and premiered in September 2015.

== Chart performance ==
Chart (2015–16)	Peak position
US Country Airplay (Billboard)	52
US Country Digital Songs (Billboard)	43

== Release history ==
Country	Date	Format	Label	Ref.
Canada	July 24, 2015	Digital download	Republic Nashville	
United States	July 24, 2015	Digital download	Republic Nashville	
United States	September 8, 2015	Country radio	Republic Nashville	
