= Stephen Jerzak =

American musician (born 1992)

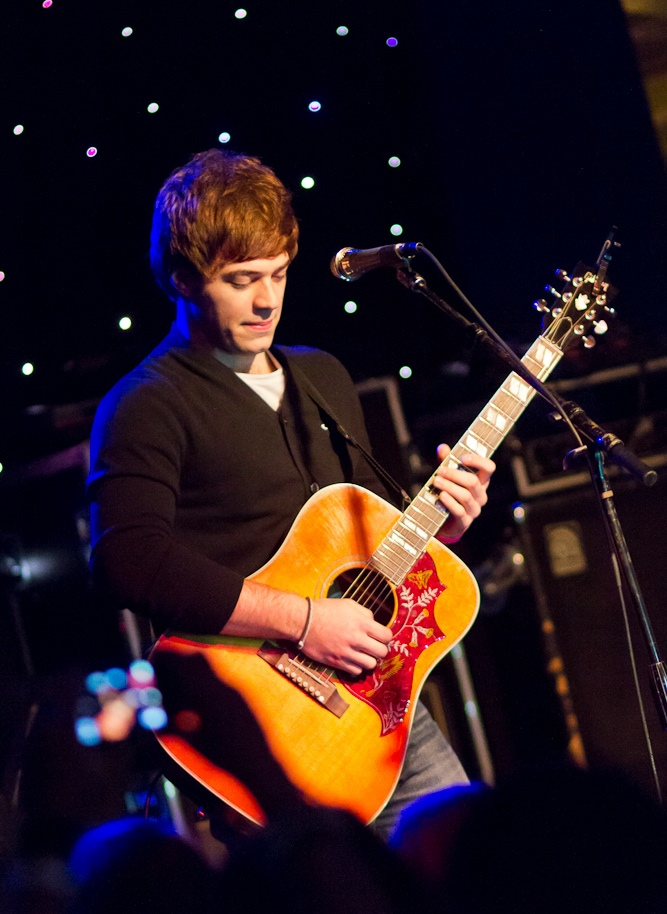
- Stephen Jerzak in 2012

Background information
- Born: Stephen Lewis Jerzak; May 5, 1992 (age 34); La Crosse, Wisconsin, United States
- Genres: Acoustic, pop
- Occupations: Singer-songwriter, musician
- Instruments: Vocals, guitar
- Years active: 2007–present
- Label: Universal
- Website: stephenjerzak.com

Stephen Lewis Jerzak (born May 5, 1992) is an American alternative-pop musician, singer, and songwriter from La Crosse, Wisconsin. Some of his notable singles include "Cute" which gained popularity on social media networks in his early career, and "She Said", a record label release of a song that was done collaboratively with American actress and singer Leighton Meester.

== Biography ==
=== 2004–07: Early Career ===
Growing up in La Crosse, Wisconsin, Jerzak began playing music as a preteen, teaching himself several instruments in his father's home studio. He joined his first band as lead singer and guitarist at age 12. The band "Under Age" consisted of classmates including his friend and now producer, Joel Tock. At age 14, he wrote and professionally recorded his first full-length album titled "Two Years Broken ", in which he released only a minimal number of physical copies and were mainly sold through his local record shops to his hometown following.

=== 2008–09: EP Releases, Nationwide Touring ===
Stephen joined MySpace in November 2008 at age 16. He started uploading cover songs and quickly became one of the website's most popular newcomers. With a steadily growing fan base, Stephen released his debut EP called "The Sky High EP" in January 2009. His second EP, "Peace.Love.Truth" followed in May 2009 consisting of his hugely popular song "Cute". Later that year, "Smile, Happy Looks Good on You" was released in November and "Snow Looks Good on You" was released in December giving the fans exactly what they wanted with more songs they could relate to; Most notably, "King" and "Party Girl". By the end of 2009 he had already amassed well over 10 million song plays on his MySpace music player and ultimately became the site's Number #1 Unsigned Artist. With an artist management deal already in place and his first major record label offer on the table, Stephen had already turned his attention to touring. Starting in the summer of 2009, Stephen co-headlined the "Bromance Tour" which took him on the road to meet his fans for the first time. On that tour he performed in 23 cites across the United States, including dates in New York, Florida, and Texas. Stephen participated in three additional tours in 2009, including an opening slot on the "EZBronz Tour" with Breathe Carolina. By the end of 2009, Stephen participated in a total of four tours which he traveled over 22,000 miles and played 70 shows from coast to coast, including his first concert appearance at the Unsilent Night 3 Festival at the Dr. Pepper Star Center in Frisco, Tx. on December 27, 2009.

=== 2010: Record Label Signing, High Profile Touring ===
At age 17, and after several major record label offers considered, Stephen signed to Universal/Republic Records in January 2010. Afterwards, he immediately moved to Los Angeles, CA to start writing his first full length Album. He began working with high-profile producers such as DJ Swivel, Mark Maxwell, Matt Squire and John Fields. After the first three months in LA, and with some tracks recorded, he hit the road again to play SXSW in March 2010 and also, continued on "The Class of 2010 Tour" with Stereo Skyline and The Downtown Fiction which took him from Texas all the way to New York. On May 1, 2010 Stephen played The Bamboozle music festival in New Jersey just before moving back out to LA to continue writing and tracking songs for his highly anticipated debut album release on a major record label. While finishing up his record, Stephen was notified that he was slated for a direct support spot on "The Up in the Air Tour" with Mike Posner, a national recording artist, that would begin in September 2010. Other performing acts on the high-profile tour included Far East Movement, 2AM Club, and Bad Rabbits. This would be followed by another tour in late 2010 called " The Suddenly Yours Tour" with Allstar Weekend, a band who gained its popularity from the Disney Channel television network. While anticipating these upcoming tours and also, a tour he would begin in August 2010 called "Hot Over Summer". Stephen's lead off single from his debut album, featuring Leighton Meester "She Said was released on July 13, 2010. This high energy, club-friendly song would ultimately define Stephen's new musical direction with the upcoming release of "Miles and Miles" in 2011. Due to Stephen's heavy touring schedule and facing the reality that "Miles and Miles" would not be released in 2010, Universal Republic and Stephen agreed to release a full-length album from his current catalog on November 9, 2010 titled "My Uke Has A Crush on You", an album which featured mainly ukulele-based songs.

=== 2011: Miles and Miles Album Release, Warped Tour ===
Fresh off tour in January 2011, Stephen began planning "The Peace Out Tour" starting in March that would ultimately take him into Mission, Texas where he performed at the Never Say Never Festival and then again in Houston, TX at SXSW Festival. Coming off the road in April 2011, Stephen was confirmed to perform on the Skull Candy Stage on the entire 44 city 2011 Vans Warped Tour which was set to kick off on June 24. Ten days prior, on June 14, 2011, Jerzak's album, "Miles and Miles" was released unveiling his new full-fledged pop sound and new musical direction.

=== 2012–13: Cassadee Pope Tour, Nashville, TN ===
In January 2012, Jerzak landed a spot with Cassadee Pope, formerly of Hey Monday on her "Solo Tour" which began in Anaheim, California and ended in Fort Lauderdale, Florida. Other participants on the 21 date tour included Darling Parade and Justin Young. In March 2012, Jerzak moved to Nashville, Tennessee to seek other musical opportunities. While there, he has since written and recorded five EPs with other artist as collaborations. "The Nashville Sessions" w/Jamestown Story was released in August 2012 and "Dance and Drive" w/Romance on a Rocketship was released in September 2012. "Taking on Eternity", a single off the Dance and Drive EP, was featured in Hollister Co. Stores across the country on the 2013 Spring Playlist. Other EP releases include 3 that were recorded with Dylan Lloyd, "What Could Be Better" released in September 2012, "This is Better" released in January 2013 and "Find A Way There" released in September 2013. Also, Jerzak released his first cover EP titled "Stephen Jerzak Covers, EP – Vol.1 in March 2013.

=== 2022: Mixed Emotion ===
Jerzak released "Mixed Emotion" on February 22, 2022. Taking elements from his old pop/acoustic style mixed with modern pop songwriting and production, the album contains 10 new songs. The album was produced by drummer Joel Tock, who also produced his first 2 EPs "Sky High" and "Peace. Love. Truth.", and also his ukulele themed album "My Uke Has a Crush on You".

== Tours ==
Tour name	Participating acts	Location	Participating from – to
Bromance Tour	Stephen Jerzak, Chase Coy, Romance on a Rocketship, Breathe Electric	North America	July 8 – August 2, 2009
Summer To Remember Tour	Scene Aesthetic, Stephen Jerzak, The Ready Set, Tyler Brown Williams, The Color Fred	North America	August 15 – September 5, 2009
EZ Bronz Tour	Breathe Carolina, Stephen Jerzak, Cash Cash, Kill Paradise	North America	November 10 – December 12, 2009
A Very Acoustic Christmas	Stephen Jerzak, The Ready Set, Breathe Electric	North America	December 27–30, 2009
The Class of 2010 Tour	Stereo Skyline, Stephen Jerzak, The Downtown Fiction, Great Big Planes, We Should Whisper	North America	March 21 – April 3, 2010
Hot Over Summer Tour	Stephen Jerzak, Let's Get It, Call The Cops, Plug in Stereo	North America	August 4–20, 2010
Up in the Air Tour	Mike Posner, Far East Movement, Stephen Jerzak, 2AM Club, Bad Rabbits	North America	September 12 – October 19, 2010
Suddenly Yours Tour	Allstar Weekend, Stephen Jerzak, Action Item, The Scene Aesthetic	North America	November 4 – December 21, 2010
Peace Out Tour	Stephen Jerzak, Breathe Electric	North America	March 3–27, 2011
Warped Tour 2011	Stephen Jerzak On Skull Candy Stage – 2011 Vans Warped Tour – All Dates	North America	June 24 – August 14, 2011
Cassadee Pope Solo Tour	Cassadee Pope, Stephen Jerzak, Justin Young, Darling Parade	North America	January 12 – February 24, 2012

== Discography ==
=== Studio albums ===
- My Uke Has a Crush on You (2010)
- Miles and Miles (2011)
- Mixed Emotion (2022)

=== EPs ===
- The Sky High (2009)
- Peace. Love. Truth. (2009)
- Smile, Happy Looks Good on You (2009)
- Snow Looks Good on You (2009)
- The Nashville Sessions with Jamestown Story (2012)
- Dance & Drive with Romance on a Rocketship (2012)
- What Could Be Better with Dylan Lloyd (2012)
- This Is Better with Dylan Lloyd (2013)
- Stephen Jerzak Covers, Vol. 1 (2013)
- Find a Way There with Dylan Lloyd (2013)

=== Singles ===
Title	Year	Album
"Goodnight, Central Park'"	2009	—N/a
"She Said" (featuring Leighton Meester)	2010	Miles and Miles
"Where Did You Go"	2011	—N/a
"With You" (featuring Dylan Lloyd)	2011	—N/a

=== Promotional singles ===
Title	Year	Album
"She Said" (The Killabits Dubstep Remix) (featuring Leighton Meester)	2011	—N/a
