= Jordie Ireland =

- Born: Matthew Jordan Ireland; 3 September 1997 (age 29)
- Origin: Sydney, New South Wales, Australia
- Occupations: Record producer; musician
- Years active: 2017–present
- Label: Casablanca Records

Matthew Jordan Ireland, professionally known as Jordie Ireland, is an Australian-based record producer, best known for his single "Take Cover". Ireland names his musical influences as Avicii, Martin Garrix, Flume and Zedd.

== Career ==
=== Early life ===
Born in 1997, Jordie Ireland grew up with a love of musical instruments. By the age of 11 Ireland was classically trained in both piano and guitar as well as drums and violin. At the age of 14, Ireland saw Avicii perform at an under-18s festival and knew straight away that's what he wanted to do.

=== 2017–present ===
In 2017, Ireland signed with Casablanca Records and in October, released his debut single "Take Cover". The song was certified Gold in Australia in 2018. In May 2018, Ireland released "One in a Million" featuring Ava Hayz.

In November 2022, Ireland released his debut EP Stages of a Heartbreak.

== Discography ==
=== Extended plays ===
List of EPs, with selected details
Title	Details
Stages of a Heartbreak	Released: 16 November 2022; Format: Digital; Label: Jordie Ireland, Sony Music

=== Singles ===
List of singles, with selected details
Title	Year	Peak chart positions	Certification	Album
Title	Year	AUS	Certification	Album
"Take Cover"	2017	112	ARIA: Gold	non album singles
"One in a Million" (featuring Ava Hayz)	2018	—		non album singles
"Throw Away My Number" (featuring Riley Biederer)	2019	—		non album singles
"Make You Mine" (with Tyron Hapi featuring Cassadee Pope)	2020	—		non album singles
"You're Not Mine" (featuring Cam Robertson)	2021	—		Stages of a Heartbreak
"Crying At the Party" (featuring Bby Ivy)	2022	—		Stages of a Heartbreak
