= Taylor Acorn =

- Born: September 21, 1993 (age 33)
- Origin: Wellsboro, Pennsylvania, U.S.
- Genres: Pop-punk; emo; pop-rock; country
- Occupations: Singer; songwriter; musician
- Instruments: Vocals; guitar
- Years active: 2014–present
- Label: Fearless
- Website: www.tayloracorn.com

Taylor Acorn (born September 21, 1993) is an American singer and songwriter. Originally gaining prominence in the country music scene, she transitioned to pop-punk and alternative rock in 2020. She is best known for her singles "Psycho" and "Shapeshifting", and her 2025 studio album Poster Child, which reached the Official UK Album Downloads Chart.

== Early life ==
Acorn was born and raised in Wellsboro, Pennsylvania. Following the death of her father when she was eight years old, her family settled in North Central Pennsylvania. She began teaching herself guitar at age 15 and was a track and field athlete at Kutztown University of Pennsylvania before withdrawing in 2014 to pursue a music career.

== Career ==
=== 2017–2019: Country music beginnings ===
Acorn moved to Nashville in 2017 after gaining a following for acoustic covers on YouTube. She signed a publishing deal with Play It Again and released the EP Put It in a Song (2017). During this period, she was named a "country artist to watch" by Billboard, performing alongside acts such as Old Dominion and Dustin Lynch.

=== 2020–2023: Pivot to pop-punk and Certified Depressant ===
During the COVID-19 pandemic, Acorn returned to her pop-punk and emo roots. She gained viral traction on TikTok for her cover of Mayday Parade's "Jamie All Over". In 2021, she released the acoustic cover EP Stay Emo, Pt. 1.

In 2022, she released original pop-punk singles "Psycho" and "Shapeshifting". In September 2023, she released the EP Certified Depressant, featuring a collaboration with Cassadee Pope on the track "Coma". The EP led to her first headlining tours in the United States and Australia.

=== 2024–present: Fearless Records and Poster Child ===
In September 2024, Acorn released her debut full-length album, Survival In Motion. The album name was inspired by a poetry phrase that Acorn found with her co-writer, Emma Lynn. In July 2025, she signed with Fearless Records and released her second album, Poster Child. The album explored themes of mental health and childhood nostalgia, receiving a 3/5 rating from Kerrang!. It debuted at number 89 on the Official UK Album Downloads Chart.

== Musical style and influences ==
Acorn's music is noted for its blending of early 2000s pop-punk energy with modern mental health-focused lyricism. She has cited Paramore, Avril Lavigne, and Kelly Clarkson as significant influences.

== Discography ==
=== Studio albums ===
Title	Details
Survival in Motion	Released: September 13, 2024; Label: Independent; Formats: Digital download, vinyl
Poster Child	Released: October 24, 2025; Label: Fearless; Formats: CD, LP, digital download

=== Extended plays ===
- Put It in a Song (2017)
- Stay Emo, Pt. 1 (Acoustic) (2021)
- Certified Depressant (2023)
