= Cassadee Pope (EP) =

Cassadee Pope EP

EP by Cassadee Pope
- Released: May 22, 2012
- Recorded: April–May 2012
- Genres: Pop rock, power pop
- Length: 14:21
- Label: Self-released
- Producers: Andrew Dixon, Jason Gavi

Cassadee Pope chronology
Cassadee Pope EP (2012)	Frame by Frame (2013)

Professional ratings
Review scores
Source	Rating
idobi radio	link

Cassadee Pope EP is the debut solo EP by American singer-songwriter Cassadee Pope, the vocalist of pop punk band Hey Monday and winner of season three of NBC's The Voice. It was released digitally on Google Play on May 22, 2012 (before her participation on, and later winning of, The Voice), and was later released on iTunes Store with a digital booklet. Pope went solo after Hey Monday went on an indefinite hiatus in December 2011. Shortly after the hiatus was announced, she played an acoustic tour in the U.S. For the album, Rian Dawson (of All Time Low) played the drums, Keith Ruddell played the bass, Andrew Dixon and Jason Gavi handling the production duties of the EP.

"This EP represents everything I am, everything I’ve worked for, and everything I’m working towards. I’m so proud of this work, and feel so close to it. I’ve always been a writer and put my heart into every lyric. But this for some reason really hits home. I’ve had some of these songs for a year, and some I’ve written just recently. I hope the passion and love that went into them shines through. Enjoy my first ever solo release!"

== Track listing ==
All tracks are written by Cassadee Pope.

No.	Title	Length
1.	"Original Love"	3:45
2.	"Secondhand"	4:10
3.	"I Guess We're Cool"	3:33
4.	"Told You So"	3:33
Total length:		14:21

== Charts ==
Chart (2012)	Peak position
U.S. Billboard Top Heatseekers	25
