= I Wish I Could Break Your Heart =

Single by Cassadee Pope

from the album Frame by Frame
- Released: March 17, 2014
- Studio: Blackbird Studio, Nashville, Tennessee
- Length: 3:41 (album version); 3:24 (radio edit)
- Label: Republic Nashville
- Songwriters: Gordie Sampson, Ashley Monroe, Jon Green
- Producer: Dann Huff

Cassadee Pope singles chronology
| "Wasting All These Tears" (2013) | "I Wish I Could Break Your Heart" (2014) | "I Am Invincible" (2015) |

"I Wish I Could Break Your Heart" is a song by recorded American country music singer Cassadee Pope, written by Gordie Sampson, Ashley Monroe and Jon Green. It was released as the second single from Pope's debut solo studio album Frame by Frame on March 17, 2014.

== Background and recording ==
The song was written in 2012 as a creative collaboration between Nashville songwriters Gordie Sampson, Ashley Monroe and Jon Green at the former's writing room, The Shack, with no particular artist in mind. According to Green, the song was written and demoed within 90 minutes, with all three "immediately latching onto" the idea. The song's title came from Monroe early in the process, providing the writers a premise and emotional angle to work with.

When the song was pitched to The Big Machine Label Group, the recently signed Cassadee Pope connected with the song and put it on hold for her forthcoming debut album. "I'd felt that before in past relationships," Pope revealed to Billboard, "Weird emotions came over me when I first heard it, and I loved it right away."

== Composition ==
"I Wish I Could Break Your Heart" is a mid-tempo ballad with a duration of three minutes and forty-one seconds. The song features drums and steel guitar, played by Chris McHugh and Paul Franklin, respectively.

According to songwriter Ashley Monroe, the song is told from the perspective of someone who loves their partner too much to actually want to hurt them but still wishes they "had the power to". This concept led her to the song's title, which became both the first line and the chorus's hook. Pope also explained her interpretation in an interview with Radio.com: "It’s not a heartbroken song where the world’s going to end but it’s a song about loving somebody. [...] You’re happy but you know that they could break you so easily and you feel so vulnerable [...] and you wish you could see if you could break them..." She described "Break Your Heart" as a positive song, with a "silly, playful" undertone. The chorus is purposely pitched higher than the surrounding verses to give the titular lyric a sense of desperation.

== Music video ==
The music video for "I Wish I Could Break Your Heart" was directed by Wes Edwards and premiered February 18, 2014 on CMT, before being released onto Vevo the following day.

== Chart performance ==
"I Wish I Could Break Your Heart" debuted at No. 49 on the Billboard Country Airplay chart for the week ending April 5, 2014.

| Chart (2014) | Peak position |
|---|---|
| US Country Airplay (Billboard) | 32 |
| US Hot Country Songs (Billboard) | 35 |

== Release history ==
| Country | Date | Format |
|---|---|---|
| United States | March 17, 2014 | Country radio |
| United Kingdom | May 9, 2014 | Digital download |
