= Virgin Territory (TV series) =

Television series

- Starring: See below
- Country of origin: United States
- Original language: English
- No. of seasons: 1
- No. of episodes: 12

Production
- Executive producers: Lauren Dolgen; Colin Nash; James DeSimas; Julie Schwachenwald; Cat Rodriguez; Dena Waxman; R. Greg Johnston
- Running time: 60 minutes
- Production company: Endemol USA

Original release
- Network: MTV
- Release: July 16 – September 24, 2014

Virgin Territory is an American reality television series that follows the real-life stories of 15 young adults from across the country as they navigate the complexities of relationships and one of the most complicated and emotional decisions of their young adult lives: whether to have sex or remain a virgin. Each episode lasts one hour and explores four different cast members from all walks of life. The series premiered on MTV in July 2014.

== Cast ==
=== The girls ===
Name	Age	Story
Abby	18	
Anike	20	
Anna	20	Anna grew up with her conservative family in Ohio, where she was always taught to save sex for marriage, but when she moved to Orlando for school, the college life and club scene came with many temptations. Anna attempts to settle down with the one boy who is not supposed to be the relationship type and make him an offer he cannot refuse.
Dominique	22	Dominique decided to abstain from sex until marriage after watching a few family members become pregnant out of wedlock. She is determined to wait for sex until she finds the right person.
Emily	21	
Keyaira	18	
Lisa	23	Lisa was raised in a religious family with strong Christian values. Now that she is engaged and with her wedding quickly approaching, she is preparing to lose her virginity to her fiancé, Nick.
Marjorie	18	
Mikaela	19	Mikaela is on a mission to find herself a nice, tattooed, alternative hipster to lose her virginity to so her friends stop singling her out as the virgin of the group. She fears that she ill have to lower her standards to find the right partner.
Shelby	22	

=== The boys ===
Name	Age	Story
Alec	21	
David	19	
John	20	
Kyle	20	Kyle, described as a popular college guy, has been keeping his virginity a secret from his friends for fear of losing their respect. He finally reveals his secret, asking his friends to help him find the special someone. When an old flame returns home and volunteers to help Kyle lose his virginity, things might become a bit easier.
Luke	22	As a pastor's son in a small town in northern Minnesota, Luke grew up as a pure-living Christian. He earned a reputation as a "kissing bandit" after going to college in Virginia. Although he stops himself from going all the way, Luke admits he struggles to control his hormones for the sake of his religious convictions.

== Episodes ==
No.	Synopsis	Original release date
1	"Dominique, Mikaela, Kyle and Lisa are introduced and explain why they are still virgins"	July 16, 2014
2	"Luke is tempted by college girls and Dominique has a heart-to-heart with her cousin about why she is waiting to have sex"	July 23, 2014
3	"Anna dumps her boyfriend, Luke struggles to avoid temptation, Dominique confronts her mother and Kyle debates giving up his virginity"	July 30, 2014
4	"New cast member Shelby is introduced and Anna, Luke and Kyle continue their stories"	August 6, 2014
5	"Anike is introduced, Shelby considers breast implants, and Anna and Alex go on a weekend getaway"	August 13, 2014
6	"David goes on his first date ever and Anna, Shelby and Anike deal with making decisions regarding their lives and virginity"	August 20, 2014
