= Frame by Frame (album) =

Studio album by Cassadee Pope
- Released: October 8, 2013
- Recorded: 2012–2013
- Genre: Country pop
- Length: 41:17
- Labels: Republic Nashville, Universal Republic
- Producers: Scott Borchetta (exec.); Cassadee Pope (exec.); Nathan Chapman; Dann Huff; Max Martin; Shellback

Cassadee Pope chronology
Cassadee Pope EP (2012)	Frame by Frame (2013)	Summer (2016)

Singles from Frame by Frame
- 1. "Wasting All These Tears" Released: May 31, 2013; 2. "I Wish I Could Break Your Heart" Released: March 17, 2014

Frame by Frame is the debut solo studio album by American singer-songwriter Cassadee Pope, lead vocalist of pop punk band Hey Monday and winner of the third season of The Voice. It was released on October 8, 2013, by Republic Nashville. The album was produced by Dann Huff with additional production from Nathan Chapman on three tracks, and Max Martin and Shellback on one.

The lead single "Wasting All These Tears" was released on May 31, 2013, charting within the Top 40 of the Billboard Hot 100 and Hot Country Songs charts. Upon release, Frame by Frame debuted on the Billboard 200 at #9 in the US, and at #1 of the Top Country Albums chart.

== Background and recording ==
Originally, Pope was the lead vocalist for the American rock band Hey Monday, which went on hiatus in 2011. While each member pursued in their own side projects, Pope decided to go solo and auditioned for the third season of the popular singing competition The Voice in 2012.

After turning the chairs of all four judges in the Blind Audition round, she chose country singer Blake Shelton to be her mentor. Pope advanced through to all ten rounds of the competition and eventually won the title of winner of The Voice 2012, while also achieving a high number of downloads of covers of songs she sang on the show that regularly topped the iTunes sales charts along the way.

In January 2013, Pope became signed to the country music label Republic Nashville – an imprint of Big Machine Records – and immediately began work on her solo debut studio album with producers Dann Huff and Nathan Chapman.

== Promotion ==
On August 3, 2013, Pope confirmed the title of the album as Frame by Frame and announced the publication of a voting poll allowing her fans to choose between two different cover arts for the album via the social networks Facebook and Twitter.

Once the votes were finalized and the cover was chosen, Pope announced that Frame by Frame would be released on October 8, 2013, later unveiling the official track listing on August 13. Pope later premiered the track "Everybody Sings" on October 4, 2013, in the lead-up to the album's release.

On October 7, 2013, Pope performed a set of songs from the album in Bryant Park, New York City.

=== Singles ===
"Wasting All These Tears" was released as the album's lead single on May 31, 2013, receiving generally positive reviews. The song peaked at number 5 on the US Billboard Hot Country Songs chart, 37 on the Hot 100, and 10 on Country Airplay. A music video followed its release; premiering on CMT on July 13, 2013. The album's second single, "I Wish I Could Break Your Heart", impacted US radio stations on March 17, 2014 its music video premiered on February 18, 2014, on CMT and was released via Vevo the next day.

The track "You Hear a Song" was released as the album's first promotional countdown single on August 13, 2013, reaching number 44 of the Billboard Hot Country Songs chart. Three more countdown singles followed; "11" on August 27 which charted at #38, "Good Times" on September 10 peeking at #50 and "Champagne" on September 24, 2013, respectively.

== Reception ==
=== Critical reception ===
Professional ratings
Review scores
Source	Rating
Roughstock	4/5 stars
Alter The Press!	4/5 stars
Allmusic	3/5 stars
HitFix	C+
Digital Journal	A
Country Weekly	B+

The album received mostly mixed to positive reviews, with most of the criticism targeting its pop-styled production and a lack of originality. Markso Papadatos of Digital Journal responded very positively to the album, noting that it "showcases [Pope's] powerful vocals and her superb storytelling ability." He concluded by rating Frame by Frame an A. Matt Bjorke of Roughstock gave the album four stars; he described Frame by Frame as "exactly the kind of crossover-ready record that was expected" from Pope, drawing comparisons to country-pop artists Taylor Swift and Carrie Underwood, and stated that every track had single potential. Bjorke went on to praise Pope's emotive vocal delivery and strength as a singer-songwriter. Allmusic gave the album three-out-of-five stars. Reviewer Steve Leggett commented on the diverse lyrical subject matter and noted that Pope's performances were "very good" but forgettable. The review also questioned Frame by Frame being marketed as country music: "It isn't really country, at least not in the old sense, instead being that kind of thinly veneered pop that passes for country these days." Victoria Patneaude of Alter the Press! gave the album a glowing review, noting that despite "some less-than-stellar moments", Pope successfully "found exactly where she belongs" in the music industry and delivered a strong debut. "This release is a testament to how far Cassadee has come and how far she is planning to go," Patneaude explains, "So move over, Taylor Swift, there's a new country pop princess here to take the throne."

Country music blog Taste of Country described the album as "America's introduction to Pope as a songwriter," and asserted that "she shows promise" in this regard. Their review also highlighted that Pope's "[undeniable] pop-rock influences" resulted in a country-pop mix that "will be unique on country radio". Country Weekly reviewer Jon Freeman rated the album "B+", saying that "[A] word of caution for fans wanting to hear some twang: this one probably isn't for you. That said, Cassadee is a tremendous vocalist and Frame by Frame wisely sticks to narratives that dig deeper into her life". He praised the writing of "Wasting All These Tears" and "11", and compared the album's sound to Avril Lavigne.

HitFix editor Melinda Newman was more critical of the "generic, slick country pop" sound and songs that sounded "like they could have gone to any number of female pop singers." However, Newman complimented Pope's "powerful and rich", if not particularly distinctive, voice, and suggested that Pope could be the first Voice winner to succeed in the industry. She gave the album a C+ rating. Brian Cantor of entertainment news blog Headline Planet cited a lack of artistic identity as the album's greatest weakness. "Poor strategy, indecisive branding and generic songwriting irrefutably plague the album," Cantor explains. Though disappointed with the project overall, Cantor praised Pope as an artist, who he deemed charismatic, promising and unique, and highlighted the few "winners" on the album. Newsday′s Glenn Gamboa was also critical, giving the album a C+ and commenting that Pope "may want to claim a country base, but her vocals are still closer to Avril Lavigne than Carrie Underwood" and that "songs like "Wasting All These Tears" feel hollow and misplaced".

=== Chart performance ===
Frame by Frame debuted at #9 on the Billboard 200 chart in the US for the week of October 16, 2013, selling 43,000 copies, and also debuted at the top of the Top Country Albums chart. The album has sold a total of 170,000 copies in the US as of May 2014.

On the Canadian Albums Chart the album debuted at #16.

== Track listing ==
No.	Title	Writer(s)	Producer(s)	Length
1.	"Good Times"	Nathan Chapman; Sarah Buxton; Blair Daly	Dann Huff; Chapman	3:42
2.	"Champagne"	Hillary Lindsey; James T. Slater; Ben West	Huff	3:52
3.	"Wasting All These Tears"	Caitlyn Smith; Rollie Gaalswyk	Huff; Chapman	3:38
4.	"I Wish I Could Break Your Heart"	Gordie Sampson; Ashley Monroe; Jon Green	Huff	3:41
5.	"Everybody Sings"	Cassadee Pope; Daly; Troy Verges	Huff	3:40
6.	"You Hear a Song"	Pope; Chapman	Huff; Chapman	3:29
7.	"This Car"	Pope; David Hodges; Sampson	Huff	4:13
8.	"One Song Away"	Lindsey; Verges; Aaron Pearce; Mike Green	Huff	3:43
9.	"Easier to Lie"	Max Martin; Shellback; Savan Kotecha	Huff; Martin; Shellback	4:01
10.	"11"	Pope; Chapman	Huff	3:50
11.	"Proved You Wrong"	Pope; Emily Shackelton; Phil Barton	Huff	3:28
Total length:				41:17

Target/Deluxe edition bonus tracks
No.	Title	Writer(s)	Producer(s)	Length
12.	"Edge of a Thunderstorm"	Pope; Liz Rose; Busbee	Huff	3:43
13.	"Cinematic"	Pope; J. T. Harding; Andy Dodd	Huff	2:51
14.	"Good Times" (acoustic version)	Chapman; Buxton; Daly	Pope	3:43
15.	"Wasting All These Tears" (acoustic version)	Smith; Gaalswyk	Pope	3:45
Total length:				55:19

== Personnel ==
Credits adapted from the liner notes of Frame by Frame

Musicians

- Tom Bukovac – electric guitar
- Nathan Chapman – acoustic guitar
- Perry Coleman – background vocals
- Eric Darken – percussion
- Shannon Forrest – drums
- Paul Franklin – steel guitar
- Dann Huff – electric guitar
- David Huff – percussion
- Charlie Judge – accordion, hammond B-3, keyboards, piano, strings, synthesizer
- Chris McHugh – drums
- Jerry McPherson – electric guitar
- Gene Miller – background vocals
- Cherie Oakley – background vocals
- Danny Rader – banjo, bouzouki, acoustic guitar, mandolin
- Jimmie Lee Sloas – bass
- Aaron Sterling – drums
- Ilya Toshinsky – acoustic guitar
- Jonathan Yudkin – fiddle, mandolin

Addition Credits

- Adam Ayan – Mastering
- Irving Azoff – Management
- Leann Bennett – Production Coordination
- Cory Bice – Assistant
- Drew Bollman – Assistant
- Sandi Spika Borchetta – Artistic Director
- Scott Borchetta – Executive Producer
- Nathan Chapman – production
- Ivan Clow – Photography
- Amy Fucci – Photo Enhancement
- Mike Griffith – Production Coordination
- Austin Hale – Graphic Design
- Sam Holland – Engineer
- Dann Huff – Producer
- David Huff – Programming
- Allison Jones – A&R
- Tina Kennedy – Management
- Justin Key – Photo Enhancement
- Andrew MacPherson – Photography
- Steve Marcantonio – Engineer
- Max Martin - production
- Seth Morton – Assistant, Engineering
- Sean Neff – Assistant
- Justin Niebank – Engineering, Mixing
- Cassadee Pope – Executive Producer
- Aaron Rayburn – Graphic Design
- Becky Reiser – Artistic Director
- Lowell Reynolds – Assistant, Engineer
- Shellback – production

== Chart performance ==
=== Weekly charts ===
Chart (2013)	Peak position
Canadian Albums (Billboard)	16
US Billboard 200	9
US Top Country Albums (Billboard)	1

Chart (2014)	Peak position
UK Country Albums (Official Charts)	3

=== Year-end charts ===
Chart (2013)	Position
US Top Country Albums (Billboard)	49

Chart (2014)	Position
US Top Country Albums (Billboard)	53

== Release history ==
Country	Date	Label	Format
Canada	October 8, 2013	Nashville, Universal Republic	CD, digital download
United States	October 8, 2013	Nashville, Universal Republic	CD, digital download
United Kingdom	May 19, 2014	Decca	CD, digital download
