= Masked Wolf =

Australian rapper (born 1991)

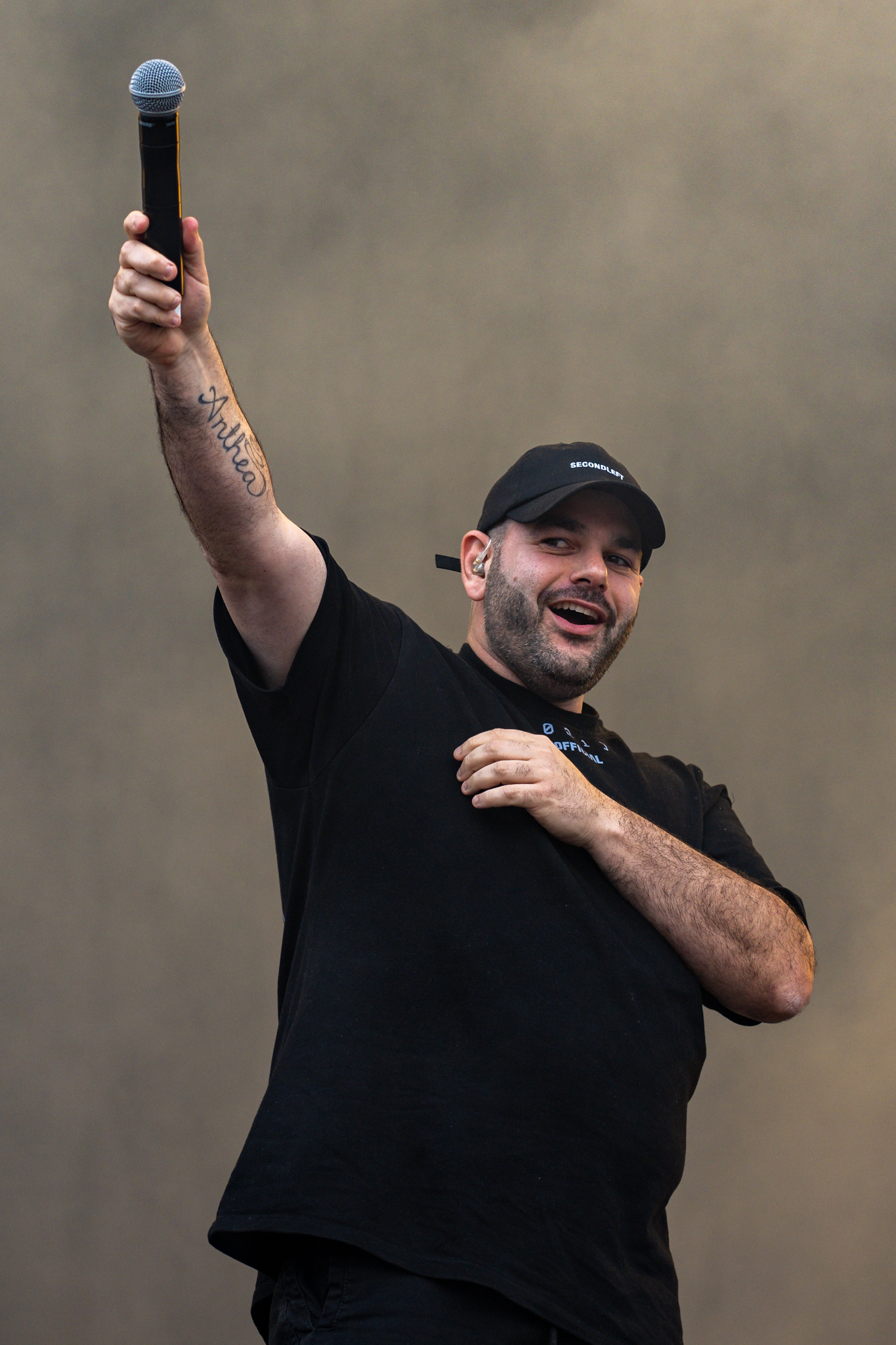
- Masked Wolf at Rock im Park in 2022
- Born: Harry Michael; 12 February 1991 (age 35); Sydney, Australia
- Occupations: Rapper; singer; songwriter
- Years active: 2018–present
- Spouse: Charlie Sky (m. 2024)
- Children: 1
- Website: https://maskedwolf.com/

Harry Michael (born 12 February 1991), known professionally as Masked Wolf, is an Australian rapper from Sydney, New South Wales. He is best known for his song "Astronaut in the Ocean", which became a sleeper hit in 2021, peaking at number 4 on the Australian ARIA Charts and number 6 on the US Billboard Hot 100, having been initially released in June 2019.

== Early life ==
Michael was raised by his grandparents who were Greek immigrants to Australia. In an interview in 2019, Michael said, "I've always been interested in music and as a young kid, my musical outlet was actually playing instruments like the piano, keyboard, guitar and drums." He is a "huge fan" of American hip hop. He began writing at the age of 13.

== Career ==
Michael signed to Teamwrk Records and released his debut single "Speed Racer" in December 2018. All of his subsequent releases were on the label, up until 2021, when "Astronaut in the Ocean" was re-released.

On 28 January 2021, Michael signed to US-based label Elektra Records, owned by Warner Music Group, in a multi-album deal. Elektra represents Michael's music in all regions except Australia and New Zealand, where he continues to be represented by Teamwrk Records. In a statement, Michael said: "I'm so happy to be a part of the Elektra family, I am really excited to be able to have the opportunity for the world to now hear my music... not only do they develop artists, but they care about each song and that's why I wanted to join them." On 4 June, Michael released the single "Gravity Glidin". The following week, "Gravity Glidin" debuted and peaked at number 40 on the NZ Hot Singles Chart for the chart dated 13 June. On 8 July, Michael released the single "Say So". The following week, "Say So" debuted and peaked at number twenty on the NZ Hot Singles Chart for the chart dated 18 July. On 21 July, Michael was announced as having the highest listener growth on Spotify in the first half of the year, which saw more than 27 million new listeners. On 24 July, Michael performed at the Splendour in the Grass virtual festival Splendour XR. On 4 September, Michael announced his debut mixtape, Astronomical, and released the single "Razor's Edge", which features X Ambassadors. Astronomical was released on 10 September.

On 19 November 2021, Masked Wolf released "It's You, Not Me (Sabotage)" with Bebe Rexha; a reimagined version of Rexha's own "Sabotage".

== Discography ==
=== Studio albums ===
List of studio albums, with release date and label shown
Title	Album details
The Devil Wears Prada But God Wears Gucci	Released: 8 November 2024; Label: TeamWrk; Formats: Digital download, streaming

=== Mixtapes ===
List of mixtapes, with release date, label, and selected chart positions shown
Title	Mixtape details	Peak chart positions	
Title	Mixtape details	CAN	US Heat.
Astronomical	Released: 10 September 2021; Labels: TeamWrk, ADA, Warner; Formats: Digital download, streaming	75	2

=== Charted singles ===
==== As lead artist ====
List of charted singles, with year released, selected chart positions and certifications, and album name shown
Title	Year	Peak chart positions										Certifications	Album
Title	Year	AUS	CAN	GER	IRE	NZ	NLD	SWE	SWI	UK	US	Certifications	Album
"Astronaut in the Ocean"	2019	4	5	4	14	6	7	16	4	12	6	ARIA: 3× Platinum; BPI: Platinum; BVMI: Platinum; RIAA: 2× Platinum; RMNZ: 4× Platinum	Astronomical
"Gravity Glidin"	2021	—	—	—	—	— (Note: "Gravity Glidin" did not enter the NZ Top 40 Singles Chart, but peaked at number forty on the NZ Hot Singles Chart.)	—	—	—	—	—		Astronomical
"Say So"	2021	—	—	—	—	— (Note: "Say So" did not enter the NZ Top 40 Singles Chart, but peaked at number twenty on the NZ Hot Singles Chart.)	—	—	—	—	—		Astronomical
"It's You, Not Me (Sabotage)" (with Bebe Rexha)	2021	—	—	—	—	— (Note: "It's You, Not Me (Sabotage)" did not enter the NZ Top 40 Singles Chart, but peaked at number 31 on the NZ Hot Singles Chart.)	—	—	—	—	—		Non-album singles
"Fallout" (featuring Bring Me the Horizon)	2022	—	—	—	—	— (Note: "Fallout" did not enter the NZ Top 40 Singles Chart, but peaked at number 40 on the NZ Hot Singles Chart.)	—	—	—	— (Note: "Fallout" did not enter the UK Singles Chart but peaked at number 29 on the UK Rock & Metal Singles Chart.)	— (Note: "Fallout" did not enter the US Billboard Hot 100 but peaked at number 14 on the Hot Hard Rock Songs chart.)		Non-album singles
"—" denotes a recording that did not chart or was not released in that territory.

==== As featured artist ====
List of singles, with year released and album name shown
Title	Year	Album
"The Den" (Joel Fletcher and Restricted featuring Masked Wolf)	2020	Non-album singles
"Something Beautiful" (Tom Walker featuring Masked Wolf)	2021	Non-album singles
"Light Year" (Crooked Colours featuring Jesiah and Masked Wolf)	2021	Tomorrows

Stone Cold Killer (With Ryan Oakes)

== Awards and nominations ==
=== APRA Awards ===
The APRA Awards are held in Australia and New Zealand by the Australasian Performing Right Association to recognise songwriting skills, sales and airplay performance by its members annually.

Year	Nominee / work	Award	Result	Ref.
2022	Tyon Hapy & Harry Michael (Masked Wolf)	Breakthrough Songwriter of the Year	Nominated	

=== ARIA Music Awards ===
The ARIA Music Awards is an annual ceremony presented by Australian Recording Industry Association (ARIA), which recognise excellence, innovation, and achievement across all genres of the music of Australia. They commenced in 1987.

Year	Nominee / work	Award	Result	Ref.
2021	"Astronaut in the Ocean"	Best Artist	Nominated	
2021	"Astronaut in the Ocean"	Breakthrough Artist	Nominated	
2021	"Astronaut in the Ocean"	Best Hip Hop Release	Nominated	
2021	"Astronaut in the Ocean"	Song of the Year	Nominated	
2021	Daniele Cernera for "Astronaut in the Ocean"	Best Video	Nominated	

=== Rolling Stone Australia Awards ===
The Rolling Stone Australia Awards are awarded annually in January or February by the Australian edition of Rolling Stone magazine for outstanding contributions to popular culture in the previous year.

Year	Nominee / work	Award	Result	Ref.
2022	Masked Wolf	Best New Artist	Nominated	
2022	Masked Wolf	Rolling Stone Global Award	Nominated	
