= Future Brown (album) =

- Cover art by DIS Magazine and D.V. Caputo

Studio album by Future Brown
- Released: February 15, 2015
- Studios: The Space Pit, Brooklyn; Shelter Studios, Perth; Nguzunguzu Studios, Los Angeles; Red Bull Studios, New York City; The Mastering Palace, Manhattan
- Genres: Electronica; UK bass; grime; dancehall; reggaeton; alternative R&B; hip hop; trap; minimal
- Length: 36:20
- Label: Warp
- Producer: Future Brown

Future Brown chronology
Future Brown Mix Vol. 1 (2015)	Future Brown (2015)

Singles from Future Brown
- 1. "Wanna Party" Released: August 2, 2013; 2. "Talkin Bandz" Released: December 4, 2014; 3. "Room 302" Released: January 8, 2015

Future Brown is the self-titled debut studio album by American electronic music supergroup Future Brown, consisting of Fatima Al Qadiri, J-Cush, and members of the duo Nguzunguzu (Asma Maroof and Daniel Pineda). Future Brown is an electronica album fusing together genres from a variety of different cultures and backgrounds. It features several rappers and musicians also associated with from a diverse set of music scenes such as Kelela, Tink, Riko Dan, Maluca, Shawnna, 3D Na'Tee, Tim Vocals, and Ruff Sqwad members Dirty Danger, Prince Rapid, and Roachee.

Released by Warp Records in February 2015, Future Brown received generally positive critical reviews and landed on the year-end lists of publications such as PopMatters, Exclaim!, and Mixmag. However, the LP's critical reception also garnered controversy, as Future Brown lambasted some reviewers for suggesting that the group intended to have art school-level concepts behind the album.

== Background ==
Fatima Al Qadiri and Asma Maroof were the first to notice that they, Daniel Pineda, and Jamie Imanian-Friedman (J-Cush) had all been working together on various solo projects. Qadiri and Maroof had thought about working together in person for a year after meeting on the internet, "and me and Jamie had just hatched the idea to start working together, so we just had a very quick conversation about why is this happening, and that we should all work together," explained Qadiri. Future Brown started sketching songs in early 2013 in a studio in New York City. Uno Recordings leader Charles Damga was responsible for investing both a studio pace and vocal features for Future Brown. 90% of the songs were done by the group together in person, Qadiri explaining that "only minor editing has been done over the internet or remotely." Only roughly half of the album's featured guests recorded in the studio. These included American rapper Tink, who appears on two tracks on the album, "Room 302" and "Wanna Party," and had vocals for both of the tracks be tracked in Future Brown's studio all in around two hours.

== Composition ==
Future Brown employs what The Fader described as "raucous club rhythms, graceful melodies, icy synths, and enchanting percussive licks" that "call out to different corners of the planet." The LP contains many signature aspects of the works of Qadiri and Nguzunguzu, including "hushed synthesizers, tropical percussion inflated with reverb and a sense of space that leaves the spotlight on the guest artists," wrote Andrew Ryce. As Crack Magazine categorized Future Brown, the group follows a hybrid of styles that "exists through a constant traffic of ideas but arrives [on the album] in the fashion that all things do in the online age: compressed, compact and finite. The nucleus of the album is a hyperreal, glossy presentation of hybridised club sounds in various contemporary mutations."

Labeled by Colin Fitzgerald as "richly textured and cleanly mixed," the record has what some critics described as a futuristic science fiction sound that is "counterpoint[ed]" by its lyrical content about partying, Killian Fox of The Observer wrote. Critic Calum Slingerland wrote that the record's clean sounds and minimal arrangements were the most similar to those on Qadiri's debut full-length album Asiatisch (2014). A HipHopDX review by Bryan Hahn analyzed the music having a "cold, metallic vibe" where "most of the sounds used would be nearly impossible to recreate with acoustic instruments, giving you a feeling of distant familiarity at best."

In addition to lyrics about sex and getting drunk usual for party music, Future Brown also deals with serious subject matter. "Asbestos" is a song about racism, where grime rapper Dirty Danger says that because his "jeans low and my face too black," he's unable to appear on The X Factor. "No Apology" deals with female empowerment, while on "Vernáculo," Maluca raps about resistance against the upper class in terms of language, where she rhymes the Spanish word culo with vernáculo.

The music follows a European electronica fusion of multiple genres from a variety of nations and cultural backgrounds, including grime, kuduro, dancehall, reggaeton, drill, bop, footwork, industrial noise, bass, and cumbia. The lyrics feature lines in languages such as English, Spanish, and Japanese as well as various regional dialects and accents such as American, British, and Jamaican. The record's set of collaborators include reggaeton acts and rappers mostly from Chicago and London. This has led multiple reviews to mislabel the LP as a pro-cultural-diversity album (see controversy section).

== Release and promotion ==
On August 2, 2013, the website of Complex magazine premiered Future Brown's first single, "Wanna Party," which landed at number 26 on a list by Fact magazine of the best tracks of 2013. A remix of "Wanna Party" featuring 3D Na'Tee, Future Brown's first release for Warp Records, was distributed on September 16, 2014 via streaming and issued to digital and vinyl formats on November 3. Future Brown wanted to sign with Warp because of the album's big production budget. Imanian-Friedman said in an interview, "Warp were very experienced: they understood what we were trying to do and weren't trying to alter our vision in the slightest, which is really just what we were looking for."

The video for "Vernáculo" was first presented at the 2014 Art Basel Miami Beach event held by Pérez Art Museum Miami, which lasted from December 4 to December 5, 2014, and then released online on December 17, 2014. Described by the museum's official website as an "exercise in capitalist surrealism," the video "appropriate[s]" methods of advertising used by companies such as L’Oreal and Revlon as a way to commentate on fake standards set by beauty product commercials. Future Brown was also promoted with two other pre-album track releases, "Talkin Bandz" on December 4, 2014, and "Room 302" January 8, 2015. NPR Music premiered Future Brown via streaming on February 15, 2018 before Warp released it to other formats on February 23, 2015.

== Critical reception ==
Professional ratings
Aggregate scores
Source	Rating
AnyDecentMusic?	7.1/10
Metacritic	69/100
Review scores
Source	Rating
AllMusic	2.5/5 stars
The Guardian	3/5 stars
The Observer	4/5 stars
Pitchfork	6.5/10
PopMatters	7/10 stars
Q	3/5 stars
Resident Advisor	3.4/5
Rolling Stone	4/5 stars
Spin	7/10
Uncut	7/10

Hahn placed a majority of the praise on Future Brown's dynamic and unique production. He wrote that it contained "strange, new sounds" that "challenge what perceptions you may have had of the vocalists," and each instrumental is "constantly evolving, swelling and shrinking, to complement the vocalists’ acoustics. [...] Not only do they know that less is more, they know when to execute it." He also complemented how diverse the set of featured vocalists were, noting that they gave the album the feel of "a personal mixtape that four friends put together for your own enjoyment." Now magazine favorably compared Future Brown to the mixtape Cut 4 Me (2013) by Kelela (who also features on Future Brown) for its combination of elements of experimental and pop music: "Future Brown unabashedly push the needle forward on stark "post-Timberland" production values by ceding the floor to a worldwide underground of vocalists [...] whose hooks, melodies and attitude give the music a familiar shape."

The 405 praised Future Brown for "highlight[ing]" the LP's featured artists of many different genres "rather than attempting to sand down everything to find common ground." Slingerland wrote that the album's musical variety "gives the record's impressive roster of vocalists plenty of space to work with, ranging from the smoothest of soul singers to the sharpest emcees," also writing that "the diversity of Future Brown never once feels overwhelming, making the trip through these sounds from a futuristic dance floor satisfying throughout." Irish critic Jim Carroll described it as "an album full of smart ideas, genre hopscotching and next- level brainstorming. The constant ducking and diving between hip-hop, dancehall, grime, r’n’b and electronica results in an imaginative rush of sound." Spin described it as "a collection with the thinnest of underlying threads to keep things from falling apart, each track standing completely apart from the rest."

Ryce wrote that the "group's individual backgrounds blend together like watercolour paints, creating a consistent, adaptable style that works well across such a wide spectrum of sounds." He also found Future Brown superior to most records that are heavy on collaborations in that "the group take the time to understand and mold to the artists they're working with." Colin Fitzgerald stated in his review of the album, "Unlike most supergroups of years past, Future Brown fulfill all the criteria for success: originality, intellectual and commercial value, and a healthy predilection for the familiar." He noted that the record's wide range of stylings and sounds "easily coalesce, and the record feels expansive and worldly as a result." However, he also noted that a few of the tracks were "sterile and shallow" because they "reveal how thin Future Brown’s methodology actually is when the novel elements don’t come together."

The Guardian claimed that the featured artists "display an intensity and character that is absent from the music," summarizing, "Every track on Future Brown is expertly constructed and polished, but rather than an exhilarating modern collaboration, it sounds like a curated exhibition." AllMusic claimed that, despite encompassing a wide variety of guest acts and genres, Future Brown was "stilted and clinical." A critic for Pretty Much Amazing opined that while "certain tracks on the album illustrate the kind of promise you’d expect from four of the world’s most eclectic production entities," the album suffered from a lack of "direction" and occasionally being "so derivative it’s infuriating."

=== Controversy ===
Because of Future Brown's globally-tinged styles, multi-lingual lyrics, and featured artists of various genres, multiple written pieces about Future Brown described it as a pro-cultural-diversity album. The Fader claimed the record challenges the existence of "English being the predominant language of popular music" and the amount of white male electronic music producers. Journalist Jazz Monroe analyzed Future Brown as having a "transcultural discord," where it "toys with an unconscious web of associations, partly generated by our casual consumption of cross-continental music." Fitzgerald described the musical content as "the manifestation of our post-modern obsession with a universal social uplink, a record prophetic of a global future where world cultures converge and evolve as one, thereby representing the progressive ideals of contemporary life."

Writer Alex Macpherson, however, opined the album actually appropriated musical styles in a negative review of Future Brown for Red Bull Music Academy titled "Is Future Brown’s Shtick 4Real?," which was published on February 17, 2015. Both Macpherson's review and an article for Pitchfork by writer Meaghan Garvey suggested Future Brown had art school-level concepts behind it and criticized the album based on that. While Garvey acknowledged that Future Brown claimed themselves to be "a free-form, vibes-based passion project, steered by the unrestricted contributions of the featured collaborators as much as the producers’ whims," both reviews used the album's promotional material (particularly the music video for "Vernáculo"), the group members' previous experiences in the modern art community, and the fact that postinternet art magazine DIS Magazine was responsible for the cover art as evidence the LP was something more than that.

Macpherson suggested the band intended to make a record promoting "cultural hybridity, to make, so says their press release, “connections between global street sounds”," and that "articles about them tend to reel off the names of these global genres in an awed tone – footwork, cumbia, reggaeton and grime, among them." He criticized the instrumentals for being "weirdly detached, uncanny-valley version[s]" of these styles: "[Future Brown's] relationship to both these genres and the guest appearances brought into the fold is a top-down one rather than ground-level; no wonder these beats sound so pristinely lofty juxtaposed with their vocals." He also battered the quartet for using art school-level ideas to gain a huge amount of attention from the press, given that the LP's featured artists had been receiving far less popularity: " This is both telling with regards to issues of class and privilege, and also an immense shame. [...] Future Brown has failed to recognise their collaborators as innovators of long standing in their own right." Garvey wrote that "it’s about everything and nothing, partying and post-postmodernism, global street music and the New York art world, commodity fetishism and basketball," but these concepts were unidentifiable when listening to the music itself, and the songs are actually "weirdly unremarkable."

Garvey and Macpherson's reviews of Future Brown garnered negative attention from members of Future Brown as well as several readers, Dummy claiming that they "rippled fast and divisive through the caverns of music Twitter." The band claimed that they weren't making Future Brown based on a high-level thesis. Al Qadiri called the reviews "attacks" in a Facebook post, reasoning that they were "proliferating theories and false notions of a malicious nature that have no factual bearing." She summarized the following: "Writers who see fit to assert a theory or thesis on behalf of an artist when there isn’t one, or posit a privilege or claim of appropriation without access, proof or knowledge, create a hostile environment for artists and readers who demand credible journalism, filled with genuine criticism and facts, good or bad." In a 2015 interview with Future Brown, Dummy asked questions about sources stating the album was appropriating foreign musical styles. J-Cush said that he was frustrated by the responses, reasoning that the group simply wanted to "bring people together on a record and make something special." He also had a reason for the album's accidental appropriation: "When you're making music and thinking about who you want to spit on the tune, that affects what comes out. If you wanna have somebody like Riko or [Prince] Rapid or Skepta come do a tune, you should think about how they're gonna fit on it."

Stereogum sided with the reviewers in this conflict, reasoning that "[The critics] seems correct in [their] assertion that Future Brown, not the critical community, are the ones who affixed high-concept baggage to their music via Art Basel exploits and loaded graphic design." The source also stated, "musicians don’t get to dictate how their music is perceived, and human beings in general aren’t always aware of how they might strike other people." Tim Wilson of The Ransom Note, on the other hand, stated that while the modern art associations with Future Brown were "unavoidable," an album "should be judged on its own merits and underpinnings, not past or peripheral ones." Wilson stated Future Brown were not entirely to blame for their appropriated representations of other styles, nor for the lack of success of the featured artists: "The collective have previously revealed that the project comes with no manifesto and all of the collaborations were conducted in a studio. It doesn’t appear that the collective remained anonymous, lofty outsiders to those involved [...] Macpherson and Garvey should look to critiquing the prejudices of their colleagues before firing barbs at young bands."

Because Red Bull Music Academy had a long previous history of promoting members from Future Brown, the publication had to remove Macpherson's review from the website by having the link for it redirect to a positive interview with the group. Gawker writer Jordan Sargent claimed it to be an example of issues that result from most music publications developing "coherent, identifiable taste, which becomes a problem when artists you once stumped for begin to suck." He reasoned that "artists are the ones who, theoretically, attract readers. So while most editors and writers would love to write as bluntly as possible about the music they cover, the truth is that the health of every magazine and website depends, to varying degrees, on which artists—and PR firms and labels—feel comfortable enough with your coverage to continue to play ball."

== Accolades ==
Publication	Accolade	Rank	Ref.
Dazed	The Top 20 Albums of 2015	20	
Exclaim!	Best of 2015: Top 10 Electronic Albums	9	
Mixmag	The Top 50 Albums of 2015	40	
PopMatters	The 80 Best Albums of 2015	46	
PopMatters	The Best Hip-Hop of 2015	8	
Rolling Stone	45 Best Albums of 2015 So Far	—N/a	

== Track listing and personnel ==
All songs written and produced by Future Brown, recorded at The Space Pit in Brooklyn, Shelter Studios in Perth, and Nguzunguzu Studios in Los Angeles, mixed by Chris Tabron at Red Bull Studios in New York City, and mastered by Dave Kutch at The Mastering Palace in Manhattan. Co-production on "Wanna Party" by Mike Q. Additional writers and vocal mixers are noted.

No.	Title	Writer(s)	Vocal mixer	Length
1.	"Room 302" (featuring Tink)	Trinity Home		2:59
2.	"Talkin Bandz" (featuring DJ Victorious and Shawnna)	DeAndre Woods; Rashawnna Guy		3:59
3.	"Big Homie" (featuring Sicko Mobb)	Delon Sneed (Lil Travis); Maurice Larry (Lil Cenotaph)	Michael "Oncore" Gougis	3:15
4.	"No Apology" (featuring Timberlee)	Timber-Lee Heaven		3:22
5.	"Vernáculo" (featuring Maluca)	Natalie Ann Yepez	Alana Da Fonseca	3:08
6.	"Dangerzone" (featuring Ian Isiah and Kelela)	I. Smith		3:45
7.	"Speng" (featuring Riko Dan)	Zane Williams		3:02
8.	"Killing Time" (featuring Johnny May Cash, King Rell and YB)	Darrell Redmond; Duan Bates; Tyrone Pittman	Chris Barnett	3:33
9.	"MVP" (3D Na'Tee and Tim Vocals)	Samantha James; Timothy Hodge		3:35
10.	"Asbestos" (featuring Dirty Danger, Prince Rapid, and Roachee)	David Nkrumah; Prince Owusu-Agyekum; R. Roach		2:59
11.	"Wanna Party" (featuring Tink)	Trinity Home		2:43
Total length:				36:20

== Release history ==
Region	Date	Format(s)	Label
Worldwide	February 15, 2015	Streaming	NPR Music
Worldwide	February 23, 2015	CD; digital download; vinyl	Warp
