= Thanks 4 Nothing =

Studio album by Tink
- Released: February 24, 2023
- Genre: R&B
- Length: 38:44
- Label: Winter's Diary; WD; Empire
- Producer: Hitmaka, Arum The Producer (co-producer)

Tink chronology
Pillow Talk (2022)	Thanks 4 Nothing (2023)	Winter's Diary 5 (2024)

Singles from Thanks 4 Nothing
- 1. "Toxic" Released: February 3, 2023; 2. "Fake Love" Released: February 21, 2023; 3. "Save Your Soul" Released: February 27, 2023; 4. "Gangsta’s Paradise" Released: April 4, 2023

Thanks 4 Nothing is the fourth studio album by American rapper and singer Tink, released on February 24, 2023, through Winter's Diary, WD Records and Empire Distribution. It was described as a "break-up song cycle", with Tink stating that she made the album for "single ladies". The album was primarily produced by Hitmaka and includes collaborations with Ty Dolla Sign and Yung Bleu.

== Critical reception ==
Professional ratings
Review scores
Source	Rating
AllMusic	3/5 stars
Pitchfork	7.6/10

Andy Kellman of AllMusic wrote that it is "almost as varied in emotions and scenarios" as Tink's previous release, Pillow Talk, and felt that the producers "serve up another round of uncluttered production" that provides Tink "ample space". Reviewing the album for Pitchfork, Tatiana Lee Rodriguez felt that although "a couple of safe songs threaten to slow the momentum, the Chicago artist sounds more defiant and grounded than ever" on the album, which "flows through heartbreak, eventually remembering her worth and finding a graceful sense of self-awareness". Rodriguez concluded by calling the album "not just Tink's exhale, it's her ecstasy, and her vengeance".

== Track listing ==
Thanks 4 Nothing track listing
No.	Title	Length
1.	"Thanks 4 Nothing (Intro)"	0:56
2.	"Fake Love"	3:25
3.	"Toxic"	2:14
4.	"Save Your Soul"	3:07
5.	"Someone on You"	3:24
6.	"I'm the Catch"	3:07
7.	"Let Down My Guard" (with Ty Dolla Sign)	3:12
8.	"Trust Issues"	3:04
9.	"Stingy" (with Yung Bleu)	3:20
10.	"Gangsta's Paradise"	2:39
11.	"Streets Ain't for Me"	2:06
12.	"Tongue Tied"	2:52
13.	"Fake Love"	2:49
14.	"New Nigga"	2:29
Total length:		38:44

== Charts ==
Chart performance for Thanks 4 Nothing
Chart (2023)	Peak position
US Billboard 200	147
US Independent Albums (Billboard)	25
US Top R&B Albums (Billboard)	22
