= Tink (musician) =

American singer (born 1995)

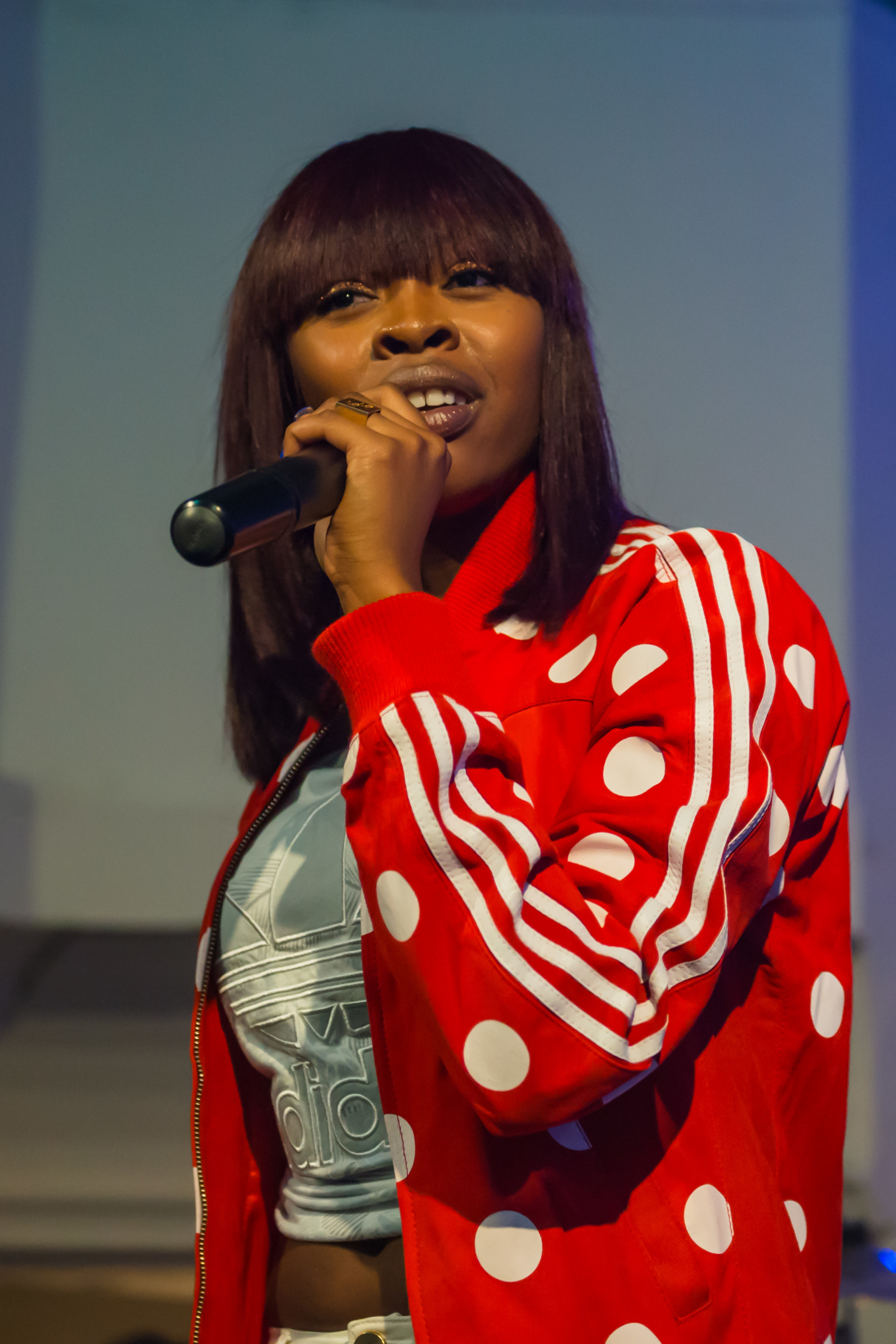
- Tink performing at NXNE in 2015

Background information
- Born: Trinity Laure'Ale Home; March 18, 1995 (age 31); Calumet City, Illinois, U.S.
- Genres: R&B; hip-hop
- Occupations: Singer; rapper; songwriter
- Years active: 2011–present
- Labels: Epic; Mosley Music; Makasound; Machine; Sony RED; Empire
- Website: thisistink.com

Trinity Laure'Ale Home (born March 18, 1995), better known by her stage name Tink, is an American singer and rapper. She signed with record producer Timbaland's Mosley Music Group, an imprint of Epic Records to release her 2014 debut single, "Treat Me Like Somebody". Her 2015 single, "Million", entered the Bubbling Under Hot 100. Both produced by Timbaland, the songs were intended to precede her debut studio album Think Tink, although disagreements with the producer led her to part ways with the label in 2017.

Tink was chosen as part of the XXL 2015 Freshman Class.

== Early life and education ==
Trinity Laure'Ale Home was born on March 18, 1995, in Calumet City, Illinois. She was nicknamed Tink by friends in elementary school and has used the name since. Tink started singing in church when she was five years old and began writing songs at age 11, including some for her father's friends. She attended high school at Chicago's Simeon Career Academy where she participated in talent shows and joined the school choir. English was one of her favorite subjects because it helped her become a stronger writer. She started rapping and recording music in her father's basement studio at the age of 15. At age 16, she and her brother posted a clip of her freestyling over Clipse's "Grindin'" to Facebook and received local buzz.

== Career ==
=== 2011–2014: Winter's Diary 2 and Timbaland ===
Tink's career officially began with the release of her 2011's mixtape, Winter's Diary, while she was still in high school under Lyrical Eyes Management. In 2012, she followed that up with two more mixtape releases Alter Ego and Blunts & Ballads. In 2013, she released her fourth mixtape, Boss Up, and she was featured on Future Brown's debut single "Wanna Party". In 2013, the buzz surrounding her mixtape releases and her collaboration with Future Brown, which led her to have a meeting with record executives in Los Angeles. At the time, Tink noted that she was comfortable staying independent.

Tink's next mixtape, Winter's Diary 2: Forever Yours, which was named the eighth-best R&B album of 2014 by Rolling Stone and the ninth-best R&B album of 2014 by Billboard. In 2014, Tink performed alongside Sleigh Bells at South by Southwest (SXSW), and the acts released a joint single, "That Did It," on the same year. She also collaborated with Kelela on a song, titled "Want It" and collaborated with Jeremih on a song, titled "Don't Tell Nobody". In October 2014, Tink signed a deal with Timbaland's Mosley Music Group, an imprint of Epic Records. Tink appeared in the WorldStarHipHop documentary showcasing Chicago's burgeoning Hip Hop scene titled "The Field: Chicago" in January 2014.

=== 2014–2017: ThinkTink and label issues ===
Her debut studio album had been scheduled to be released in 2015 and was preceded by the single "Ratchet Commandments". Timbaland made headlines in 2015 by indicating at SXSW that Aaliyah had appeared to him and described Tink as "the one." Tink would later perform an unreleased track that samples Aaliyah's "One in a Million". In April 2015, the unreleased track, now titled "Million", was released.

Epic scheduled a July 2015 release for Think Tink but Timbaland decided to delay the project. "The album was actually finished. There was an intro, I had interludes." Tink told the FADER in February 2018. "It was [Timbaland's] call to hold back on it, and I think, I want to say, for the benefit of the doubt, he did want to perfect it. But it was Tim's call not to put it out." Frustrated by Mosley and Epic's resistance to letting her share new material with her fans, Tink returned to the formula that had initially earned her a loyal following, and released her third mixtape in the Winter's Diary series called Winter's Diary 3 which featured one of her most famous songs to date named "I Like".

In 2016, Tink released several tracks throughout the beginning of the year and dropped her seventh mixtape named Winter's Diary 4. The mixtape was mentioned on Rolling Stone's "40 Best Rap Albums of 2016" and ended up on number 20.

In 2017, Tink released few songs and had a six month long social media break, the reason for which would later become clear. In a February 2017 interview, Tink told DJ Vlad that she hadn't spoken to Timbaland in three months and said that the ball was still in his court when it came to releasing Think Tink. That spring, she began to seek a permanent solution that would get her out of her contract with Mosley, eventually reaching an agreement with the label at the end of the year with the rights to her unreleased music. Tink is now an independent artist. She does not have any interest in releasing any of her songs with Timbaland as she wants to start from scratch.

=== 2018–2020: Independence, Pain & Pleasure and Hopeless Romantic ===
In January 2018, Tink's mixtape catalog appeared on all streaming services. After leaving Mosley Music Group and Epic Records, Tink released her first EP Pain & Pleasure in March 2018 through Machine Entertainment Group and Sony RED.

In 2019, Tink founded her own label, Winter's Diary, under Empire. On April 28, 2019, she released the mixtape Voicemails, through Winter's Diary and Empire. The lead single was Bad Side.

Tink released the album Hopeless Romantic through Winter's Diary and Empire on February 14, 2020.

=== 2021–present: Heat of the Moment ===
On July 30, 2021, Tink released her second album Heat of the Moment, which was executive produced by Hitmaka.

== Musical style ==
Tink has been compared to Lauryn Hill, Ms. Jade and Da Brat. Her first mixtape, Winter's Diary, was largely filled with R&B ballads, but her second mixtape, Alter Ego, established her rapping skills. Her subsequent mixtapes have blended her R&B and rap styles. Tink has also been loosely associated with the Drill movement that was birthed in Chicago. Some of her early songs (like "Bad Girl") display some of the genre's hallmarks like aggressive beats and violent lyrics. She has since distanced herself from that movement, saying that she wants to become "a positive, realistic vision of female empowerment."

Much of the lyrical content in her music deals with complex emotional issues that are geared toward a primarily teenage demographic. She often uses a Chicago setting to convey her feelings about love, heartbreak, faithfulness, and teenage melodrama. Tink has been praised for her storytelling ability. Her music has also taken on issues like female empowerment and the Black Lives Matter movement.

== Discography ==
=== Studio albums ===
List of studio albums
Title	Details	Peak chart positions			
Title	Details	US	US R&B/HH	US R&B	US Ind.
Hopeless Romantic	Released: February 14, 2020; Label: Winter's Diary, Empire Distribution; Format: Digital download, streaming	99	—	12	11
Heat of the Moment	Released: July 30, 2021; Label: Winter's Diary, Empire; Format: Digital download, streaming	54	31	5	7
Pillow Talk	Released: August 19, 2022; Label: Winter's Diary, Empire; Format: Digital download, streaming	43	25	9	8
Thanks 4 Nothing	Released: February 24, 2023; Label: Winter's Diary, Empire; Format: Digital download, streaming	147	—	22	25
Winter's Diary 5	Released: July 12, 2024; Label: Winter's Diary, Empire; Format: Digital download, streaming	140	48	14	24
Fuck, Marry, Kill	Released: April 10, 2026; Label: Winter's Diary, Empire; Format: Digital download, streaming	—	—	—	—

=== Mixtapes ===
List of mixtapes
Title	Album details
Winter's Diary	Released: March 14, 2012; Label: Self-released; Format: Digital download
Alter Ego	Released: July 20, 2012; Label: Self-released; Format: Digital download
Blunts & Ballads	Released: December 28, 2012; Label: Self-released; Format: Digital download
Boss Up	Released: September 30, 2013; Label: Self-released; Format: Digital download
Winter's Diary 2: Forever Yours	Released: January 10, 2014; Label: Self-released; Format: Digital download
Winter's Diary 3	Released: July 30, 2015; Label: Self-released; Format: Digital download
Winter's Diary 4	Released: August 25, 2016; Label: Self-released; Format: Digital download
Voicemails	Released: April 28, 2019; Label: Winter's Diary, Empire; Format: Digital download

=== Extended plays ===
List of extended plays
Title	EP details	Peak chart positions		
Title	EP details	US	US R&B	US Ind.
Pain & Pleasure	Released: March 30, 2018; Label: Self-released; Format: Digital download	147	19	15
A Gift and a Curse	Released: December 25, 2020; Label: Winter's Diary, Empire; Format: Digital download, streaming	—	—	44

=== Singles ===
==== As lead artist ====
List of singles, with selected chart positions, showing year released and album name
Title	Year	Peak chart positions						Certifications	Album
Title	Year	US Bub.	US R&B /HH	US R&B	US Elec.	NZ Hot	UK	Certifications	Album
"Treat Me Like Somebody"	2014	—	—	—	—	—	— (Note: "Treat Me Like Somebody" did not enter the UK Singles Chart, but peaked at number 13 on the Independent Singles Breakers Chart.)		Winter's Diary 2: Forever Yours
"Ratchet Commandments"	2015	—	— (Note: "Ratchet Commandments" did not enter the Billboard Hot R&B/Hip-Hop Songs chart, but peaked at number 35 on the Mainstream R&B/Hip-Hop Airplay chart.)	—	—	—	—		Non-album singles
"Million"	2015	14	38	13	—	—	—		Non-album singles
"I Like"	2015	—	—	—	—	—	—		Winter's Diary 3
"Wet Dollars" (featuring Tazer)	2015	—	—	—	33	—	63		Non-album single
"Different"	2018	—	—	—	—	—	—		Voicemails
"Bad Side"	2019	—	—	—	—	—	—		Voicemails
"Fuck Around"	2019	—	—	—	—	—	—		Hopeless Romantic
"Cut It Out"	2020	—	—	—	—	—	—	RIAA: Gold	Hopeless Romantic
"Bottom Bitch"	2020	—	—	24	—	—	—	RIAA: Gold	A Gift and a Curse
"Selfish" (featuring Yung Bleu)	2021	—	—	—	—	—	—		Heat of the Moment
"Rebel" (featuring Jeremih)	2021	—	—	20	—	—	—		Heat of the Moment
"Heat of the Moment"	2021	—	—	23	—	—	—		Heat of the Moment
"Cater" (with 2 Chainz)	2022	—	— (Note: "Cater" did not enter the Hot R&B/Hip-Hop Songs chart, but peaked at number 20 on the R&B/Hip-Hop Airplay chart.)	23	—	—	—		Pillow Talk
"Goofy"	2022	—	—	—	—	—	—		Pillow Talk
"Switch"	2022	—	—	—	—	—	—		Pillow Talk
"Fake Love"	2023	—	— (Note: "Fake Love" did not enter the Billboard Hot R&B/Hip-Hop Songs chart, but peaked at number 33 on the Mainstream R&B/Hip-Hop Airplay chart.)	—	—	—	—		Thanks 4 Nothing
"Stingy" (with Yung Bleu)	2023	—	—	—	—	—	—		Thanks 4 Nothing and Love Scars II
"40x"	2023	—	—	—	—	—	—		Non-album single
"Charged Up"	2024	—	—	—	—	—	—		Winter's Diary 5
"Huh"	2024	—	—	—	—	—	—		Winter's Diary 5
"Songs About U" (with Summer Walker)	2024	—	— (Note: "Songs About U" did not enter the Billboard Hot R&B/Hip-Hop Songs chart, but peaked at number 15 on the Mainstream R&B/Hip-Hop Airplay chart.)	11	—	28	—		Winter's Diary 5
"Insane"	2024	—	— (Note: "Insane" did not enter the Billboard Hot R&B/Hip-Hop Songs chart, but peaked at number 11 on the Adult R&B Airplay chart.)	—	—	—	—		Winter's Diary 5
"Can We Talk?" (featuring Bryson Tiller)	2025	—	—	—	—	—	—		Fuck, Marry, Kill
"Emergency"	2025	—	—	—	—	—	—		Fuck, Marry, Kill
"Gang" (with G Herbo)	2026	—	—	—	—	—	—		Fuck, Marry, Kill
"Overrated"	2026	—	—	—	—	—	—		Fuck, Marry, Kill
"Non Negotiables"	2026	—	—	—	—	—	—		Fuck, Marry, Kill
"Bedrock" (featuring Rob49)	2026	—	—	—	—	—	—		Fuck, Marry, Kill
"—" denotes a recording that did not chart.

==== As featured artist ====
List of singles as featured performer, showing year released and album name
Title	Year	Album
"Wanna Party" (Future Brown featuring Tink)	2013	Wanna Party / World's Mine
"That Did It" (Sleigh Bells featuring Tink)	2014	Non-album single
"Can't Sleep Love" (Pentatonix featuring Tink)	2015	Pentatonix
"Work" (Bekoe featuring Moneydudetazo and Tink)	2015	Illanoize
"UFO" (Timbaland featuring Future and Tink)	2015	Non-album single
"Rock Steady" (Paris Libretto featuring Tink)	2015	Non-album single
"Outta Line" (Jacquees featuring Tink)	2016	Non-album single
"Mine" (G Herbo featuring Tink)	2017	Humble Beast
"G.M.O. (Got My Own)" (Mýa featuring Tink)	2018	Non-album single
"Black Men Don't Cheat" (K Camp featuring Ari Lennox, 6lack and Tink)	2020	Kiss Five
"So Fine" (Anycia featuring DJ Drama and Tink)	2025	TBA

=== Guest appearances ===
List of non-single guest appearances, with other performing artists, showing year released and album name
Title	Year	Other performer(s)	Album
"Temporary"	2015	Saba	—N/a
"Put The Guns Down"	2015	R. Kelly	Chi-Raq (Soundtrack)
"Frenemies"	2015	Timbaland, Sy Ari Da Kid	King Stays King
"Tables Turn"	2015	Timbaland, Obsessed	King Stays King
"Drama Queen"	2015	Timbaland	King Stays King
"If He Find Out"	2015	Lil Bibby, Jacquees	Free Crack 3
"All Falls Down"	2016	Chocolate Droppa	Kevin Hart: What Now? (The Mixtape Presents Chocolate Droppa)
"Senses"	2017	Mack Wilds	AfterHours
"Girls Need Love (Girls Mix)"	2023	Summer Walker, Victoria Monét, Tyla	—N/a
"Way Too Much"	2023	Lady London	S.O.U.L.
