= Beautiful Lies (Yung Bleu and Kehlani song) =

2021 single by Yung Bleu and Kehlani

Single by Yung Bleu and Kehlani

from the album Moon Boy
- Released: November 2, 2021
- Length: 3:32
- Label: Vandross; Empire
- Songwriters: Jeremy Biddle; Kehlani Parrish; Chaz Jackson; Dashawn “ Happie “ White; Darrien Overton
- Producers: Chazzz Music; Dashawn “Happie” White; Dinuzzo

Yung Bleu singles chronology
"Trying" (2021)	"Beautiful Lies" (2021)	"Stay Down" (2021)

Kehlani singles chronology
"I Like Dat (Remix)" (2021)	"Beautiful Lies" (2021)	"Little Story" (2022)

Music video
- "Beautiful Lies" on YouTube

"Beautiful Lies" is a song by American singers Yung Bleu and Kehlani from the former's debut studio album Moon Boy (2021). It was initially released as a promotional single on July 21, 2021, before being sent to rhythmic contemporary radio on November 2, 2021 as the album's fifth single. The song was produced by Chazzz Music, Dashawn “Happie” White and Dinuzzo.

== Critical reception ==
Reviewing Moon Boy for AllMusic, Fred Thomas wrote that "Bleu is at his best when he's matching powers with his collaborators" and "the cloudy ambiance of 'Beautiful Lies' with Kehlani push Moon Boy's already versatile range even further."

== Music video ==
An official music video was released on December 2, 2021. Directed by Jon Primo, it is set in a deserted military camp, where Yung Bleu camps out with his troop. The clip begins with him walking around the base with his love interest, before they board a UFO and ventures off into a portal. Bleu is transported to an alternate universe, where he is greeted by Kehlani. After he spends some time in the new dimension, Kehlani uses her superpowers to transport Bleu back to his base. Bleu is then reunited with his partner. The clip stars actress Parker McKenna Posey.

== Charts ==
=== Weekly charts ===
Weekly chart performance for "Beautiful Lies"
Chart (2021–2022)	Peak position
New Zealand Hot Singles (RMNZ)	18
US Billboard Hot 100	65
US Hot R&B/Hip-Hop Songs (Billboard)	20
US Rhythmic Airplay (Billboard)	2

=== Year-end charts ===
2022 year-end chart performance for "Beautiful Lies"
Chart (2022)	Position
US Hot R&B/Hip-Hop Songs (Billboard)	69
US Rhythmic (Billboard)	21
