= Love in the Way =

Single by Yung Bleu and Nicki Minaj

from the album Tantra
- Released: September 16, 2022
- Genre: R&B
- Length: 3:42
- Label: Moon Boy University; Empire
- Songwriters: Jeremy Biddle; Onika Maraj; Sam Tompkins; Daniel Goudie; Rug Wilson; Ashley Milton
- Producers: Sam Tompkins; Dnny Phntm; Dson Beats; Julio Fernandez; JulyDaProducer; TheBoyKam; Sauce Boy; Preme

Yung Bleu singles chronology
"One Light (Remix)" (2022)	"Love in the Way" (2022)	"Life Worth Living" (2022)

Nicki Minaj singles chronology
"Super Freaky Girl" (2022)	"Love in the Way" (2022)	"Tukoh Taka" (2022)

Music video
- "Yung Bleu & Nicki Minaj - Love In The Way (Official Video)" on YouTube

"Love in the Way" is song by American rappers Yung Bleu and Nicki Minaj. It was released on September 16, 2022, through Moon Boy University and Empire Distribution as the second single from Yung Bleu's second studio album Tantra. The song samples "Whole" by British singer Sam Tompkins. Lyrically, it is a break-up song, with the two artists "bemoan[ing] how it hurts to love again in the aftermath of an intense relationship."

== Music video ==
The song's official music video dropped on September 22, 2022. The video opens with Minaj in a "pink peacock-esque" bodysuit atop a golden throne, with Bleu joining in from a balcony in between two "futuristic" buildings. These solo shots are interspersed with the two accompanied by backup dancers in "sleek African attire."

== Charts ==
Chart performance for "Love in the Way"
Chart (2022)	Peak position
New Zealand Hot Singles (RMNZ)	24
US Billboard Hot 100	93
US Hot R&B/Hip-Hop Songs (Billboard)	25
US R&B/Hip-Hop Airplay (Billboard)	29
US Rhythmic Airplay (Billboard)	25

== Release history ==
Release history and formats for "Love in the Way"
Country	Date	Format	Labels	Ref.
Various	September 16, 2022	Digital download; streaming	Moon Boy University; Empire	
United States	September 20, 2022	Rhythmic contemporary radio	Vandross; Empire	
