= AfterHours (album) =

Studio album by Mack Wilds
- Released: April 7, 2017
- Recorded: 2016–17
- Genre: R&B
- Length: 37:27
- Label: The Ninety Five Percent; EMPIRE
- Producer: Mack Wilds; Remi; Riley; Storch; Poyser

Mack Wilds chronology
New York: A Love Story (2013)	AfterHours (2017)

Singles from AfterHours
- 1. "Love in the 90z" Released: November 24, 2015

AfterHours is the second studio album by American R&B singer Mack Wilds. It was released on April 7, 2017, by The Ninety Five Percent and EMPIRE. The album features guest appearances from Wale, Tink and Cam Wallace.

== Background ==
The album's title was inspired by the recording process. Mack created AfterHours at night and wanted to reflect this in the content. Wilds “A lot of these songs, when I had a chance to actually record — they were recorded at night," Mack said "while I was shooting 'The Breaks' and 'Shots Fired', that was the only time I had to myself or to even get into the studio. I drew on inspiration that came from looking around and seeing how things change at night time, how things feel at night time. Text messages at 2 a.m. look different than text messages at 2 p.m. Break-ups feel different at night."

== Release ==
The single "Love in the 90z" was released on November 24, 2015. The music video premiered on YouTube on January 16, 2016, and directed by Benny Boom. In the video, Wilds can be seen pursuing a girl in New York City. The song makes several references to 1990s musical acts, particularly in contemporary R&B. These include TLC, Keith Sweat, Will Smith, R. Kelly and Jodeci.

== Track listing ==
No.	Title	Producer(s)	Length
1.	"Intro"	Mack Wilds	1:40
2.	"Bonnie and Clyde" (featuring Wale)	Mack Wilds	3:43
3.	"Obsession"	Mack Wilds	3:13
4.	"Senses" (featuring Tink)	Mack Wilds	3:28
5.	"Vibes" (featuring Cam Wallace)	Mack Wilds	3:12
6.	"Stolen Gold"	Mack Wilds	2:30
7.	"Couldthisbelove?"	Mack Wilds	1:51
8.	"Stingy"	Mack Wilds	2:55
9.	"Go Crazy"	Mack Wilds	4:40
10.	"Explore"	Mack Wilds	2:15
11.	"Choose"	Mack Wilds	4:22
12.	"Crash"	Mack Wilds	3:17
13.	"Love in the 90z"	Salaam Remi; Teddy Riley; Scott Storch; Poyser	4:04
