= Future Brown =

American hip hop group

- Origin: Los Angeles, United States
- Genres: Electronic
- Years active: 2013–present
- Label: Warp Records
- Members: Fatima Al Qadiri; J-Cush; Asma Maroof; Daniel Pineda
- Website: futurebrown.com

Future Brown are a production group formed of Fatima Al Qadiri, J-Cush, Asma Maroof and Daniel Pineda (the Los Angeles based duo also known as Nguzunguzu).

In July 2013, the group posted their first single "Wanna Party" featuring Chicago based rapper/singer Tink, followed by "World's Mine" in November. The two tracks made up the band's debut release for Warp Records after the announcement of their signing to the label in September 2014. The band released their eponymous debut album on February 24 via Warp.

== Discography ==
=== Studio albums ===
- Future Brown (2015)

=== EPs ===
- Wanna Party / World's Mine (2014)

=== Mixtapes ===
- Future Brown Mix Vol. 1 (2015)
