= Baddest (Yung Bleu, Chris Brown, and 2 Chainz song) =

Song by American musicians Yung Bleu, Chris Brown, and 2 Chainz

Single by Yung Bleu, Chris Brown, and 2 Chainz

from the album Moon Boy
- Released: June 11, 2021
- Recorded: 2021
- Genre: R&B; hip hop; trap
- Length: 3:22
- Label: Vandross; Empire
- Songwriters: Ivory Scott IV; Jeremy Biddle; Christian Ward; Tauheed K. Epps; Chris Brown; Tee Romano; Joshua Parker; Brian Morgan; Christopher Dotson; Ivory Scott IV; Mike Woods; Oliver Scott; Ronnie Wilson; Terrence Williams
- Producers: Hitmaka; OG Parker; Romano; Mike Woods

Yung Bleu singles chronology
"Thieves in Atlanta" (2021)	"Baddest" (2021)	"Selfish" (2021)

Chris Brown singles chronology
"Rain Down" (2021)	"Baddest" (2021)	"Angles" (2021)

2 Chainz singles chronology
"Nah Nah Nah (Remix)" (2020)	"Baddest" (2021)	"Million Dollars Worth of Game" (2022)

Music video
- "Baddest" on YouTube

"Baddest" is a song by American musicians Yung Bleu, Chris Brown, and 2 Chainz. It was released through Vandross Music Group and Empire as the third anticipation single from Bleu's album Moon Boy on June 11, 2021. The song was written produced by Hitmaka, OG Parker, Romano, and Mike Woods.

== Background and composition ==
Bleu and Hitmaka sketched the song during the first months of 2021, and Bleu asked the producer, that at the time was working on Chris Brown's album Breezy, if he could've get him to sing the hook and chorus that they wrote. After 2 Chainz added his verse, in April Hitmaka previewed the song on his Instagram posting snippets of it.

The song is an R&B, hip hop, and trap mid-tempo produced by OG Parker, Hitmaka, Romano and Mike Woods. The instrumental of the song contains a vocal sample of SWV's song "You're Always on My Mind" (from the group's debut album It's About Time), a song that was already used by Brown in an interpolation for the 2017 single "Always" by A1, where he was featured alongside Ty Dolla $ign.

== Critical reception ==
The song received positive responses from music critics. Pitchfork reviewer Alphonse Pierre defined the song as one of Moon Boy highlights, stating that "Brown's hook carried the song to a whole other level". HotNewHipHop called the song a "smooth banger" praising Brown and 2 Chainz appearances. Fred Thomas of AllMusic complimented the song "thoughtfully constructed hook" and "gentle gliding" saying that the song has a "sunny R&B flavor".

== Music video ==
The official music video for the song was released on July 7, 2021. In the video Bleu navigates a hood party looking for a lady, while Brown dances in a balcony looking at a full moon.

== Charts ==
=== Weekly charts ===
Weekly chart performance for "Baddest"
Chart (2021)	Peak position
New Zealand Hot Singles (RMNZ)	38
US Billboard Hot 100	56
US Hot R&B/Hip-Hop Songs (Billboard)	17
US R&B/Hip-Hop Airplay (Billboard)	3
US Rhythmic Airplay (Billboard)	5

=== Year-end charts ===
Year-end chart performance for "Baddest"
Chart (2021)	Position
US Hot R&B/Hip-Hop Songs (Billboard)	80
US Rhythmic (Billboard)	38

== Certifications ==
Certifications for "Baddest"
Region	Certification	Certified units/sales
New Zealand (RMNZ)	Gold	15,000^{‡}
United States (RIAA)	Gold	500,000^{‡}
^{‡} Sales+streaming figures based on certification alone.

== Release history ==
Region	Date	Format(s)	Label
Various	June 11, 2021	Digital download; streaming	Empire
