= You're Mines Still =

2020 song by Yung Bleu

"You're Mines Still (Remix)"

Single by Yung Bleu featuring Drake

from the album Love Scars: The 5 Stages of Emotions (Deluxe) and Moon Boy
- Released: October 2, 2020 (original); October 16, 2020 (remix)
- Recorded: 2020
- Genre: R&B; hip hop
- Length: 3:46
- Label: Vandross; Empire; OVO; Warner
- Songwriters: Jeremy Biddle; Aubrey Graham; Nate Rhoads
- Producer: Rhoads

Yung Bleu singles chronology
"Territory" (2020)	"You're Mines Still (Remix)" (2020)	"Ghetto Love Birds" (2021)

Drake singles chronology
"Mr. Right Now" (2020)	"You're Mines Still (Remix)" (2020)	"Outta Time" (2020)

Audio video
- "You're Mines Still" (Original) on YouTube

Audio video
- "You're Mines Still" (Remix) on YouTube

"You're Mines Still" is a song by American rapper Yung Bleu. It was released on October 2, 2020, as the third track from his EP Love Scars: The 5 Stages of Emotions. A remix featuring Canadian rapper Drake was released on October 16, 2020, as part of the deluxe version of the EP and was later included on his debut studio album Moon Boy (2021). The remix came about after basketball player DeMarcus Cousins reached out to both artists, urging them to collaborate. The soft, melodic song finds the two harmonizing about their ex-lovers who they still hold on to. Singer Chloe Bailey released a cover of the song in March 2021.

== Background ==
Yung Bleu announced in an interview with Flaunt that he intended to release a new EP on October 2. The EP, Love Scars: The 5 Stages of Emotions was released on the announced date and included "You're Mines Still". The EP marked his first release after departing Columbia Records and signing to Empire Distribution.

Basketball player DeMarcus Cousins, an associate of Yung Bleu, first reached out to Bleu, stating how much he loved his EP and how he envisioned Drake on the song. Cousins contacted Drake in the hopes of him remixing the song. Yung Bleu did not anticipate that a collaboration would occur, until three days later when Drake responded to Cousins, saying "send the record". After Yung Bleu posted the message on his Instagram, Drake eventually followed him on Instagram on October 9, and expressed interest in doing the remix.

According to Bleu, Drake finished his verse within a few hours: "Everybody on my team was thinking that if he did do it, it was going to take at least, like, three or four months to get it. He sent it back the same day". However, the collaboration almost did not come to fruition, as Yung Bleu missed a FaceTime call from Drake because he was sleeping: "I was so mad. I really thought it was over. I ended up texting him the next day and talking about it. But he was mad cool. Drake is a real genuine dude. He really doesn't care how big you are. [...] He's a real musical person, like the genius kind". Following the release of the remix, Yung Bleu said he received many requests to collaborate from other artists and revealed that he has a "big follow-up work" with another major artist.

== Composition ==
"You're Mines Still" was described as a "soft" and "emotionally-driven" melodic R&B song, that plays over a trap beat, built on an acoustic-guitar loop reminiscent of Juice Wrld's "Lucid Dreams" - which itself is an interpolation of Sting’s 1993 hit "Shape of My Heart". It finds the rappers "mulling" over their past relationships and their toxic ways, confessing on how they refuse to move on or let their exes move on. Drake arrives, with what Rolling Stone's Claire Shaffer deemed a "trademark petty zinger", with the line "Pretty face, pretty tempted/But pretty taught me ugly lessons".

== Critical reception ==
Revolt's Jon Powell named the track a standout from Love Scars: The 5 Stages of Emotions and noted Drake's "different perspective to the overall vibe of the melancholy cut". Joe Price of Complex wrote: "Perfectly suited to Drizzy's blend of singing and rapping, the two make for a compelling duo on the remix". Stereogum's Tom Breihan said Drake "gets into his usual jealous possessive-boyfriend bullshit", but concluded that "it does work as a showcase for Yung Bleu, a name that's new to most of us".

== Charts ==
=== Weekly charts ===
Weekly chart performance for "You're Mines Still" Remix
Chart (2020–2021)	Peak position
Canada Hot 100 (Billboard)	36
Netherlands Single Tip (MegaCharts)	27
New Zealand Hot Singles (RMNZ)	9
UK Singles (Official Charts)	45
UK Hip Hop/R&B (Official Charts)	22
US Billboard Hot 100	18
US Hot R&B/Hip-Hop Songs (Billboard)	10
US Rhythmic Airplay (Billboard)	1

=== Year-end charts ===
Year-end chart performance for "You're Mines Still"
Chart (2021)	Position
US Billboard Hot 100	58
US Hot R&B/Hip-Hop Songs (Billboard)	24
US Rhythmic (Billboard)	23

== Certifications ==
Certifications for "You're Mines Still"
Region	Certification	Certified units/sales
United Kingdom (BPI)	Gold	400,000^{‡}
United States (RIAA)	2× Platinum	2,000,000^{‡}
^{‡} Sales+streaming figures based on certification alone.
