= Track Star (song) =

2021 single by Mooski

Single by Mooski

from the album Melodic Therapy 4 the Broken
- Released: June 17, 2020 (TikTok); February 19, 2021 (official single)
- Length: 3:19
- Label: Universal
- Songwriter(s): Darien Hinton; Levi de Jong
- Producer(s): Woodpecker

Mooski singles chronology
"Track Star" (2020)	"Game of Love" (2021)

"Track Star" is a song by the American rapper Mooski. It is the lead single from his debut album Melodic Therapy 4 the Broken. It was released on TikTok on June 17, 2020, and other streaming services on February 19, 2021. The song was later remixed featuring American recording artists Chris Brown, Yung Bleu and A Boogie wit da Hoodie.

== Background ==
The track was released on February 19, 2021, following its success on TikTok. A remix featuring A Boogie wit da Hoodie, Chris Brown and Yung Bleu was released on May 18, 2021.

== Music video ==
A music video was released on April 7, 2021. It was directed by BenMarc and produced by VisionBank. Coi Leray also stars in the video.

== Reception and chart success ==
Robby Seabrook III of XXL wrote that the track is "a melodic ode centered on a woman who has let go of a troubled relationship despite her man's attempts to fix it", and of the artist, "Everything is looking up for the young artist from Alabama, making him a perfect fit for XXL's The Break this week."

In a Billboard article, Mooski spoke on his rise to success: "Where I come from, it's unheard of. I've been counted out my whole life and I've always been successful because I work hard. I didn't need anybody in my corner -- I wanted them in my corner."

"Track Star" debuted at number 21 on the US Bubbling Under Hot 100 on the week of February 26, 2021. It later reached number 99 and reaching number 31 on the Billboard Hot 100. Additionally, the song spent a total of 20 weeks on the latter chart. It also peaked at number 53 on the UK Singles Chart.

== Charts ==
=== Weekly charts ===
Weekly chart performance for "Track Star"
Chart (2021)	Peak position
New Zealand Hot Singles (RMNZ)	12
UK Singles (OCC)	53
UK Hip Hop/R&B (OCC)	19
US Billboard Hot 100	31
US Hot R&B/Hip-Hop Songs (Billboard)	12
US Pop Airplay (Billboard)	35
US Rhythmic (Billboard)	2

=== Year-end charts ===
Year-end chart performance for "Track Star"
Chart (2021)	Position
US Billboard Hot 100	75
US Hot R&B/Hip-Hop Songs (Billboard)	35
US Rhythmic (Billboard)	28

== Certifications ==
Certifications for "Track Star"
Region	Certification	Certified units/sales
Canada (Music Canada)	Gold	40,000^{‡}
United Kingdom (BPI)	Silver	200,000^{‡}
United States (RIAA)	Platinum	1,000,000^{‡}
^{‡} Sales+streaming figures based on certification alone.
