= Mooski =

American rapper and singer

- Mooski in 2021

Background information
- Also known as: Trip Lee Jr.
- Born: Darien Hinton; Opp, Alabama, U.S.
- Genres: Hip hop; R&B
- Occupations: Rapper; singer
- Years active: 2019–present
- Label: Capitol
- Website: www.mooskiofficial.com

Darien Hinton, known professionally as Mooski, is an American rapper and singer. Signed to Capitol Records, he is best known for his 2021 viral single "Track Star", which peaked at number 31 on the Billboard Hot 100. It also gained popularity on TikTok. He released a remix of "Track Star" (featuring Chris Brown, A Boogie wit da Hoodie and Yung Bleu) on May 18, 2021. Hinton later released his debut studio album, Melodic Therapy 4 the Broken, on March 11, 2022.

== Life and career ==
Hinton was born and raised in Opp, Alabama and is of African-American descent. Both of his parents had health issues. Hinton grew up with an interest in music as part of the choir in a local church. He began his musical career as a Gospel rapper before switching to hip hop after he listened to Lil Wayne and Drake. Other hip hop artists that Hinton listened to include PnB Rock, Fetty Wap, and Kevin Gates.

After graduating high school in 2015, Hinton served in the United States Marine Corps for four years before he began working to establish his musical career.

In June 2020, Mooski released "Track Star" through TikTok where it gained rapid popularity, over 475+ million views. In February 2021, the song start streaming on other platforms and was released as a single by Capitol Records. "Track Star" later entered the Billboard Hot 100 at number 99 and peaked at number 31, remaining on the chart for a record-breaking 20 weeks. It also peaked at number 53 on the UK Singles Chart. A remix of the song (featuring A Boogie wit da Hoodie, Chris Brown and Yung Bleu) was released on May 18, 2021.

On March 11, 2022, Hinton released his debut studio album Melodic Therapy for the Broken. The album features guest appearances from Chris Brown, Yung Bleu, A Boogie wit da Hoodie, and K Camp. The song "Counting Time" samples "Charlene" by Anthony Hamilton.

== Discography ==
=== Studio albums ===
List of albums with selected details
Title	Album details
Melodic Therapy 4 the Broken	Released: March 11, 2022; Label: Capitol; Formats: Digital download, streaming

=== Singles ===
==== As lead artist ====
Title	Year	Peak chart positions			Certifications	Album
Title	Year	US	US R&B/HH	UK	Certifications	Album
"Play Your Part" (with UnderGod Gwalla)	2019	—	—	—		Non-album single
"Track Star"	2021	31	12	53	RIAA: Platinum; BPI: Silver; MC: Gold	Melodic Therapy 4 the Broken
"Game of Love"	2021	—	—	—		Non-album single
"Track Star Remix" (featuring Chris Brown, A Boogie wit da Hoodie, and Yung Bleu)	2021	—	—	—		Melodic Therapy 4 the Broken
"Zodiac Killer"	2021	—	—	—		Non-album single

=== Guest appearances ===
List of non-single guest appearances, with other performing artists, showing year released and album name
Title	Year	Other performer(s)	Album
"Rain on Your Skin"	2021	K Camp	Float
