= Winter's Diary 5 =

2024 studio album by Tink

Studio album by Tink
- Released: July 12, 2024
- Genre: R&B
- Length: 44:06
- Label: Winter's Diary; Empire
- Producer: Alan Ami; Aphillyated; Bankroll Got It; The Breed; Bizness Boi; Camper; Cardiak; Chopsquad DJ; Daniel Church; CRVS; Derelle Rideout; Zach Ezzy; Cam Griff; Hitmaka; Hossy; Tyler James; Lou Xtwo; James Maddocks; Oh Gosh Leotus; RockBoyBeats; Tyler Rohn; Saint Luca; Jesse Salcedo; S.Dot; Skiponthebeat; SpenceDidThis; Th3ory; Vinnl; Wu10; Ye Ali

Tink chronology
Thanks 4 Nothing (2023)	Winter's Diary 5 (2024)

Singles from Winter's Diary 5
- 1. "Charged Up" Released: April 10, 2024; 2. "Huh" Released: May 10, 2024; 3. "Songs About U" Released: May 31, 2024; 4. "Insane" Released: January 29, 2025

Winter's Diary 5 is the fifth studio album by American rapper and singer Tink, released on July 12, 2024, through Winter's Diary and Empire Distribution. It is the fifth installment of the Winter's Diary series started by Tink in 2012. In order to promote the album, Tink joined Jhené Aiko's The Magic Hour tour as an opening act.

== Background ==
Three singles were released prior to the album. The lead single, Charged Up, was released on April 10, 2024, accompanied by a music video. The second single, Huh, was released on May 10, 2024 and the "sultry, Sam Brave-directed music video" premiered on the same day. The final single before the album release, Songs About U, featuring Summer Walker was released on May 31, 2024. The Source described the collaboration as "a testament to the enduring allure of R&B, transcending boundaries and leaving a lasting impact on contemporary music".

== Track listing ==
Winter's Diary 5 track listing
No.	Title	Writer(s)	Producer(s)	Length
1.	"WD5 Intro"	Trinity Home; Imani	Hitmaka; RockBoyBeats; The Breed	1:41
2.	"Huh"	Home	Bizness Boi; Hitmaka; Vinnl; Ye Ali	2:18
3.	"Stressin"	Home; Chrishan; Imani	Bizness Boi; Hitmaka; James Maddocks; Oh Gosh Leotus	2:48
4.	"Charged Up"	Home; Chrishan; Hitmaka; Imani	Alan Ami; Bizness Boi; CRVS; Cam Griff; Hitmaka; Skiponthebeat; Tyler James	2:59
5.	"Bless Me Don't Stress Me"	Home	Aphillyated; Bizness Boi; Daniel Church; Hitmaka; Jesse Salcedo; Th3ory; Tyler Rohn	3:06
6.	"Songs About U" (with Summer Walker)	Home; Imani; Summer Walker; Ron E	Griff; Hitmaka; S.Dot	3:14
7.	"Hit a Lick" (featuring NoCap)	Home; Hitmaka; No Cap	Chopsquad DJ	2:59
8.	"Playa" (featuring Skilla Baby)	Home; Trevon Gardner	Bankroll Got It; Hitmaka	2:14
9.	"Grip Tight"	Home; Goldiie	Hitmaka; Lou Xtwo; Saint Luca; Zach Ezzy	3:59
10.	"Make It Make Sense"	Home	Bizness Boi; Derelle Rideout; Hitmaka; Oh Gosh Leotus	2:14
11.	"Attention"	Home; Imani; Ron E	Cardiak; Hitmaka; Wu10	3:05
12.	"Past Those Interlude" (featuring Jeremih)	Home; Hitmaka; Chi Hoover; Jeremy Felton	Camper; Hitmaka	1:54
13.	"Jealous"	Home; Goldiie; Felton; Keith James; Michael Schultz	Hitmaka; Lou Xtwo	3:11
14.	"Insane"	Home; Imani	Hitmaka; Hossy; Lou Xtwo	2:48
15.	"Lows & Highs" (featuring Janine)	Home	SpenceDidThis	2:58
16.	"Pretty Girls"	Home; Imani; Ron E	Cardiak; Hitmaka; Wu10	2:38
Total length:				44:06

== Personnel ==
- Tink – vocals
- Mike Seaberg – mastering, engineering, mixing on all tracks except "Songs About U"
- Jaycen Joshua – mastering and mixing on all tracks except "Songs About U", engineering on "Charged Up" and "Bless Me Don't Stress Me"
- Nigel Johnston – mixing on "Songs About U"
- Jesse Jazz – recording
- Shawn "Source" Jarrett – recording on "Charged Up"

== Charts ==
Chart performance for Winter's Diary 5
Chart (2024)	Peak position
US Billboard 200	140
US Independent Albums (Billboard)	24
US Top R&B/Hip-Hop Albums (Billboard)	48
