= New York: A Love Story =

Studio album by Mack Wilds
- Released: September 30, 2013
- Recorded: 2012–13
- Genre: R&B
- Length: 49:44
- Label: Louder Than Life; RED
- Producer: Salaam Remi (exec.); Bink; Havoc; Ne-Yo; Rico Love; DJ Premier; James Fauntleroy; James Poyser; Pete Rock

Mack Wilds chronology
New York: A Love Story (2013)	AfterHours (2017)

Singles from New York: A Love Story
- 1. "Own It" Released: June 24, 2013

New York: A Love Story is the debut studio album by American R&B singer Mack Wilds. It was released on September 30, 2013, by Louder Than Life and RED Distribution. The album features guest appearances from Method Man, Raekwon and Doug E. Fresh. The album was nominated for Best Urban Contemporary Album at the 56th Grammy Awards, which was held on January 26, 2014.

== Background ==
In July 2013, in an interview with Bossip, Mack Wilds spoke about why he decided to name the album New York: A Love Story, saying: "We had a bunch of different titles. We had a bunch of different names, and thoughts and ideas. But it really just turned into what it sounds like. It sounded like New York and it sounded like a love story, so it really just kind of gave itself that name. We just let everybody know." In the same interview, he spoke about whose idea it was to use classic samples on the album, saying: "Yes. It was a mix of both our ideas and thoughts. Salaam [Remi] came to the table and first it was moreso like a test, he wanted to see what I could do with certain songs. I think the first song I recorded was "Own It". And he just wanted to see what I could do with that, and we did it. Then we just started talking about different beats we wanted to try and it was a real moment, us just trying to figure out different things we could flip around like "Yo, what if we flip this beat like this?" or "Yo, what if we just pull this from this and did that? Yo, that would be crazy." I think one of the first beats that we flipped was "Hennesy" with the Mobb Deep sample. And it just really came together. He played it for Havoc, Havoc loved it, gave him the original beat for it. Havoc twisted it, fixed it up. It was dope. It really just came together from there."

In November 2013, in an interview with Complex, he spoke about if he was surprised by the positive feedback he got from the album, saying: "I was and I think it's mainly because I didn't know what to expect. You do a project, you know it feels good to yourself, you know what it is but to really have it be respected everywhere, by everyone. I really haven't heard anything bad as of yet." He also spoke about how he wanted to represent New York on the album, saying: "We really wanted to just re-represent that iconic sound of New York. I feel like it right now we are in a soundscape where real musicality is coming back but in hip-hop, there is such a focus on trap rap. We wanted to do something where we fully established what the sound is in New York. Things have changed, years have gone by, but I feel like in certain aspects New York is still the same New York was when hip-hop was becoming hip-hop. New York still has the same heartbeat as it always has." He also spoke about how it was working with producer Salaam Remi on the album, saying: "Amazing. I think the best thing about it was that it wasn't even just a work relationship. Salaam is like my big brother. I've known since I was 18. From 18 to literally this past December, we were just kicking it. He would bring me to the studio and let me hear some stuff. I would let him hear the things I was working on and he would critique it. As I started to grow as an artist, he finally got to a point where he was like, "Come down to Miami, let's see what you can actually do." We went out there for a week and we knocked out like seven records in seven days and four of those records made the album."

He also spoke about remaking Michael Jackson's "Remember the Time", saying: "See, he tricked me with that! I say he tricked me because, I was in the room writing "Henny" and he called me into the other room, he was like, "Yo! Just record 'Remember the Time' over that." I'm like, "Are you serious?" He was like, "Yeah, yeah just record it." I'm thinking we are just playing around because we are in the studio, just having fun. I recorded it, he's listening to it and he's like, "That's good, we're going to keep it." "We are going to keep it? Do what? We're keeping a Michael Jackson's record?" I almost threw up. It was crazy. But it's amazing the way that it turned out especially after rerecording it, touching it up and hearing how the different aspects that he placed in it, like the orchestration or even the harps, it really turned it into a whole another monster."

== Singles ==
On June 24, 2013, the album's first single "Own It" was released. On July 30, 2013, the music video was released for "Own It". On December 16, 2013, the remix to "Henny" featuring Mobb Deep and French Montana, was released. On December 23, 2013, the music video was released for "Henny".

== Critical response ==
Professional ratings
Review scores
Source	Rating
AllMusic	4/5 stars

Upon its release, New York: A Love Story was met with generally positive reviews from music critics. Andy Kellman gave the album four out of five stars, saying "Tristan Wilds was only four years old when Enter the Wu-Tang was released, but he snared fellow Staten Island native Method Man for the first song of his debut album, in which The Wire and 90210 actor proclaims, "The Shaolin is back again." While Wilds is predominantly a singer who couldn't possibly be termed hardcore, music of the early to mid-'90s—specifically post-new jack R&B, or hip-hop soul—informs much of New York: A Love Story. Wilds even re-envisions Michael Jackson's 1992 single "Remember the Time" by softening and slowing it into something of a 1994-1995 throwback. Other high points include the breezy "My Crib," the harder "Henny" and "Own It," and "U Can Cry to Me," which would lose none of its appeal without the guest appearances from Raekwon and Doug E. Fresh. This is a promising first step from a smooth, thoughtful, and understated voice."

== Track listing ==
No.	Title	Producer(s)	Length
1.	"Wild Things" (featuring Method Man)	Salaam Remi	3:41
2.	"My Crib"	Salaam Remi; Bink	3:57
3.	"Henny"	Salaam Remi; Havoc	3:01
4.	"Own It"	Salaam Remi; Ne-Yo	4:14
5.	"MaGic!!!"	Salaam Remi; Rico Love	3:51
6.	"Keepin It Real"	Salaam Remi; DJ Premier	3:02
7.	"U Can Cry to Me" (featuring Raekwon and Doug E. Fresh)	Salaam Remi; James Fauntleroy	4:50
8.	"NY Love Story"	Salaam Remi	4:39
9.	"Don't Turn Me Down"	Salaam Remi; Rico Love	5:12
10.	"Sober Up"	Salaam Remi; James Poyser	3:58
11.	"The Art of Fallin'"	Pete Rock	2:53
12.	"Remember the Time"	Salaam Remi; Havoc	3:04
13.	"Duck Sauce"	Pete Rock	3:22

== Charts ==
Chart (2013)	Peak position
US Billboard 200	179
US Top R&B/Hip-Hop Albums (Billboard)	28
US Independent Albums (Billboard)	36
US Heatseekers Albums (Billboard)	7
