= Moon Boy (album) =

Studio album by Yung Bleu
- Released: July 23, 2021
- Recorded: 2020–2021
- Genre: Hip hop; R&B; trap
- Length: 49:23
- Label: Vandross; Empire
- Producer: Adriel Calaway; Bordeaux; CazNovBeats; Chaz Jackson; Crater; Aldaz; Dashawn "Happie" White; Dinuzzo; DMacTooBangin; DY; Eric Forcen; Ervin Garcia; HicksMadeThat; Hitmaka; JD On Tha Track; JuanRa; Mike Woods; Morgan O'Connor; Nate Rhoads; Non Native; OG Parker; ReoN; Romano; Swamiq; T.Hill; Triple Six; Turbo

Yung Bleu chronology
Love Scars: The 5 Stages of Emotions (2020)	Moon Boy (2021)	Tantra (2022)

Singles from Moon Boy
- 1. "You're Mines Still" Released: October 16, 2020; 2. "Ghetto Love Birds" Released: January 22, 2021; 3. "Baddest" Released: June 11, 2021; 4. "Way More Close (Stuck in a Box)" Released: July 9, 2021; 5. "Beautiful Lies" Released: November 2, 2021

Moon Boy is the debut studio album by American rapper and singer Yung Bleu. It was released on July 23, 2021, through Vandross Music Group and Empire. The album contains guest appearances from John Legend, H.E.R., Moneybagg Yo, Kodak Black, Kehlani, Big Sean, Jeezy, Drake, Gunna, Chris Brown, 2 Chainz, Davido, and A Boogie Wit da Hoodie. It features production from Nate Rhoads, Hitmaka, OG Parker, and Turbo, among others.

== Background and release ==
Bleu said that for his debut album he wanted to define "his unique sound, made of this era's wave of autotuned trap music mixed with R&B beats and melodies". He told The Breakfast Club, "I've always been a fan of R&B, and i was lucky enough to have some of my biggest inspirations on my album, such as John Legend and Chris Brown. Breezy actually inspired me with the moon concept with his Heartbreak on a Full Moon album, that I thought was unbelievable". He explained that his intention with the album was to become a notable mainstream artist: "I've been on the underground scene for a long time. This is my crossover to that bigger level".

== Singles ==
The lead single of the album, "You're Mines Still", which features Canadian rapper and singer Drake and is a reworked version of Bleu's single of the same name, was released on October 16, 2020. The second single, "Ghetto Love Birds", was released on January 22, 2021. The third single, "Baddest", which features American singer Chris Brown and American rapper 2 Chainz, was released on June 11, 2021. The fourth single, "Way Too Close (Stuck in a Box)", featuring Big Sean, was released on July 9, 2021. The fifth single, "Beautiful Lies", a collaboration with American singer Kehlani, was sent to rhythmic contemporary radio on November 2, 2021, after initially being released as a promotional single on July 21, 2021.

== Critical reception ==
Professional ratings
Review scores
Source	Rating
AllMusic	3.5/5 stars
Pitchfork	5.9/10
HipHopDX	3.5/5 stars
Popdust	6.5/10

Upon its release, the album was met with generally positive reviews from music critics. Fred Thomas of AllMusic complimented its versatile range, finding it unusual for a trapper, saying that "The album meanders somewhat through its various styles, and there are several less memorable tracks among the stronger material, but Moon Boy ultimately gels regardless." Pitchfork reviewer Alphonse Pierre said that "Moon Boy is weighed down by streaming bait, but thankfully it does include a handful of Bleu's highest highs, such as "Die Under the Moon" and "Baddest"". Ben Brutocao of HipHopDX praised Bleu's performances, stating "Bleu's autotuned voice is his greatest asset, powerful enough to deliver sonorous hooks", but was disappointed of its lyrical content, saying "his lyrics are devoid of anything unique or personable". Popdust said that the album shines on his "sugary autotuned R&B club hits" and falls flat on his "super cliché trap-influenced street tales"."

== Track listing ==
No.	Title	Producer(s)	Length
1.	"Die Under the Moon" (with John Legend)	Crater; CazNov Beats	3:38
2.	"Tired of You" (with H.E.R.)	Bordeaux; Non Native; Ervin Garcia; Eric Forcen	3:08
3.	"Angels Never Cry" (featuring Kodak Black and Moneybagg Yo)	ReoN; JuanRa; Aldaz	4:13
4.	"Beautiful Lies" (with Kehlani)	Chaz Jackson; Dashawn "Happie" White; Dinuzzo	3:32
5.	"Contract Killers"	JD On Tha Track; Swamiq	2:03
6.	"Way More Close (Stuck In A Box)" (featuring Big Sean)	Nate Rhoads; Hitmaka	4:08
7.	"Shoe Box" (featuring Jeezy)	Nate Rhoads	3:37
8.	"Late Summer"	Nate Rhoads	2:47
9.	"You're Mines Still" (featuring Drake)	Nate Rhoads	3:46
10.	"Water Works" (with Gunna)	Morgan O'Connor; Turbo; DY Krazy	3:14
11.	"Baddest" (with Chris Brown and 2 Chainz)	Hitmaka; OG Parker; Romano; Mike Woods	3:22
12.	"Unforgiving" (with Davido)	T.Hill; Adriel Calaway	2:37
13.	"Dark Clouds"	JD On Tha Track; Dmac	2:53
14.	"Old Days"	HicksMadeThat; Triple Six	3:10
15.	"Ghetto Love Birds" (with A Boogie wit da Hoodie)	Nate Rhoads	3:16
Total length:			49:23

== Charts ==
=== Weekly charts ===
Weekly chart performance for Moon Boy
Chart (2021)	Peak position
US Billboard 200	12
US Top R&B/Hip-Hop Albums (Billboard)	7

=== Year-end charts ===
Year-end chart performance for Moon Boy
Chart (2021)	Position
US Top R&B/Hip-Hop Albums (Billboard)	97
