= Ann Marie =

American rapper and songwriter

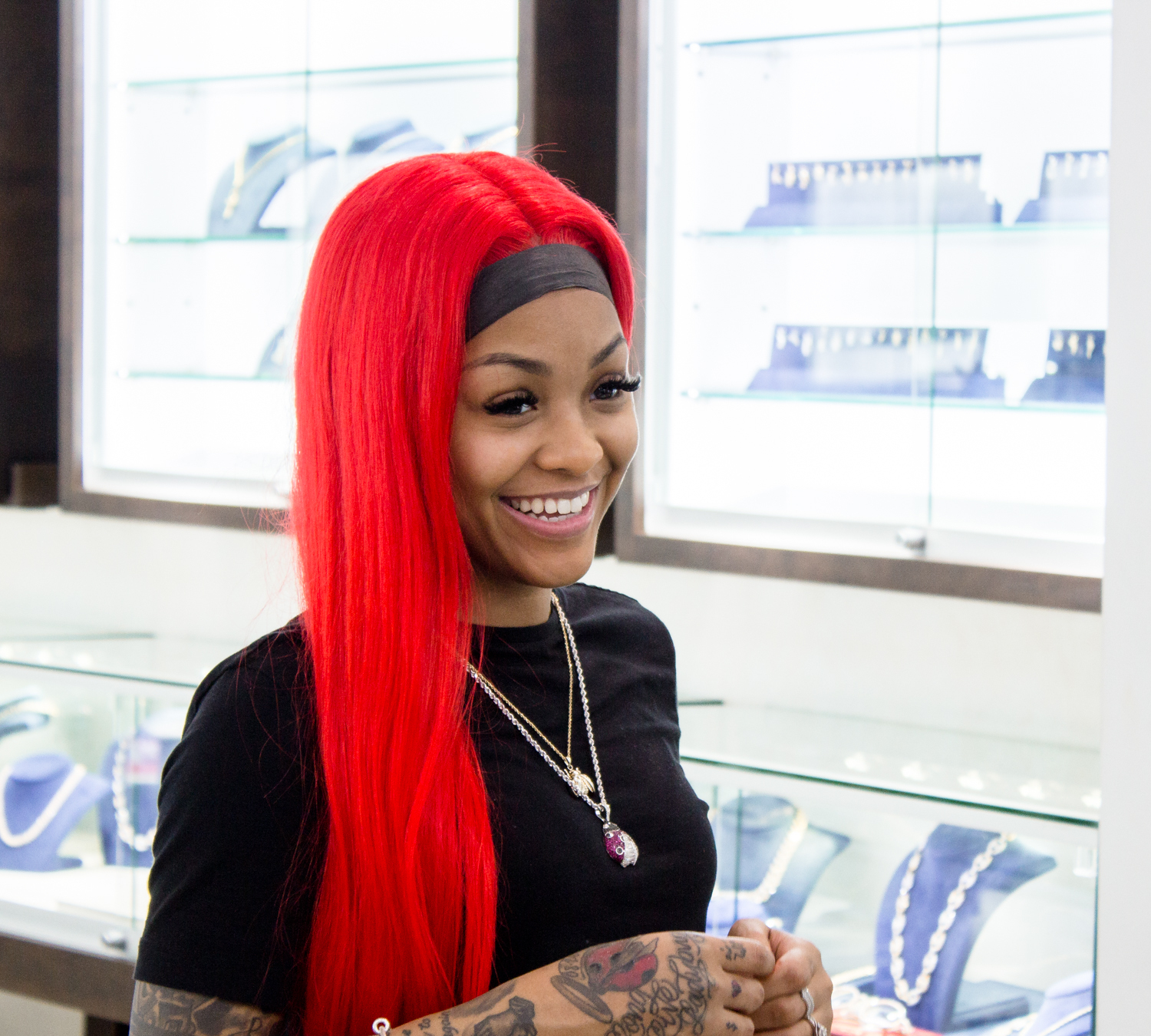
- Ann Marie in 2019

Background information
- Born: Joanne Marie Slater; November 20, 1995 (age 30); Chicago, Illinois, U.S.
- Genres: R&B; Hip hop
- Occupations: Singer; rapper
- Years active: 2015–present
- Label: Interscope
- Website: annmarieofficial.com

Joann Marie Slater (born November 20, 1995), known professionally as Ann Marie, is an American singer and rapper signed to Interscope Records. She is best known for her single "Secret", which has garnered over 100 million views on YouTube and peaked at number 22 on the Billboard Hot R&B Songs chart. Her debut EP Pretty Psycho was released on July 10, 2019.

== Early life ==
Ann Marie was born Joann Marie Slater in Englewood, Chicago, Illinois. She began singing at an early age, crediting her uncle for encouraging her to recite Whitney Houston's "My Love Is Your Love" repeatedly.

== Legal issues ==
In December 2020, Slater was charged with possession of a gun and aggravated assault with a deadly weapon in connection to an Atlanta hotel shooting of childhood friend and alleged boyfriend, Jonathon "Sandillo" Wright. Slater allegedly told an officer that a "gun fell off the table in the hotel room where the shooting happened". She was later released on bond.

== Influences ==
Slater has stated that she draws inspiration from 90s R&B, especially from artists like Aaliyah, Jagged Edge, SWV, Xscape.

== Discography ==
=== Studio albums ===
List of albums, with selected details
Title	Details
Hate Love	Released: September 8, 2021; Label: Zulu, Geffen; Format: Digital download
Goated	Released: December 26, 2025; Label: Ann Marie, StreamCut; Format: Digital download, streaming

=== EPs ===
List of EPs, with selected details
Title	Details
Pretty Psycho	Released: July 10, 2019; Label: Zulu, Interscope; Format: Digital download

=== Mixtapes ===
List of mixtapes, with selected details
Title	Details
Unfuckwitable	Released: May 24, 2017; Label: Self-released; Format: Digital download
Tripolar	Released: April 13, 2018; Label: Self-released; Format: Digital download
Tripolar 2	Released: January 1, 2019; Label: Self-released; Format: Digital download
Tripolar 3	Released: March 15, 2023; Label: Self-released; Format: Digital download

=== Singles ===
List of singles showing year released and album name
Title	Year	Peak chart positions	Certifications	Album
Title	Year	US R&B	Certifications	Album
"Handle It"	2018	—	RIAA: Gold	Tripolar
"Secret" (featuring YK Osiris)	2019	22	RIAA: Gold	Tripolar 2
"Ride for Me" (featuring Yung Bleu)	2019	—		Tripolar 2
"Drip" (featuring Jeremih)	2019	—		Pretty Psycho
"Touch Me"	2019	—		Pretty Psycho
"Throw It Back"	2019	—		Pretty Psycho
"—" denotes a title that did not chart, or was not released in that territory.

Pain Never Looked This Good (Day) released 2022 Pain Never Looked This Good (Night) released 2022

== Tours ==
=== Headlining ===
- The Tripolar Tour (2019)
- Moon Boy Tour (2021) with Yung Bleu
