= Pillow Talk (Tink album) =

Studio album by Tink
- Released: August 19, 2022
- Genre: R&B
- Length: 46:17
- Labels: Winter's Diary; Empire
- Producer: Hitmaka

Tink chronology
Heat of the Moment (2021)	Pillow Talk (2022)	Thanks 4 Nothing (2023)

Singles from Pillow Talk
- 1. "Cater" Released: April 29, 2022; 2. "Goofy" Released: July 22, 2022; 3. "Switch" Released: August 19, 2022

Pillow Talk is the third studio album by American rapper and singer Tink, released on August 19, 2022, through Winter's Diary and Empire Distribution. The album was produced by Hitmaka. The album features collaborations with other artists including 2 Chainz, Muni Long, Toosii, Fabolous, Layton Greene, Russ and G Herbo.

== Critical reception ==
Professional ratings
Review scores
Source	Rating
AllMusic	4/5 stars
Pitchfork	7.6/10

Brady Brickner-Wood of Pitchfork wrote that the album "fine-tunes her collaborative chemistry with Hitmaka and further establishes the pair as one of R&B's premier singer–producer teams. The album seamlessly flits between steamy slow jams and pristine pop songs, its architecture indebted to the opulence of '90s R&B". Andy Kellner of AllMusic described Pillow Talk as "another high-luster set of ballads and slow jams" and "expectedly rich with openhearted musings and uninhibited carnality, yet Tink's expressions here—finely accentuated by some of her loveliest background vocals—have a slightly deeper resonance".

== Track listing ==
Pillow Talk track listing
No.	Title	Length
1.	"Goin Bad"	2:42
2.	"Switch"	3:23
3.	"Opposite"	2:50
4.	"Goofy"	3:20
5.	"Cater" (with 2 Chainz)	2:44
6.	"Throwback"	3:23
7.	"Mine"	2:54
8.	"25 Reasons Interlude"	1:40
9.	"Cum See Me" (with Toosii)	3:33
10.	"Oooh Triflin" (with Fabolous)	2:29
11.	"Balance"	2:33
12.	"Drunk Text'n" (with Layton Greene)	3:27
13.	"News" (with Russ)	3:15
14.	"Ghetto Luv" (with G Herbo)	2:42
15.	"Cum'n 2"	2:58
16.	"I Choose Me"	2:17
Total length:		46:17

== Charts ==
Chart performance for Pillow Talk
Chart (2022)	Peak position
US Billboard 200	43
US Independent Albums (Billboard)	8
US Top R&B/Hip-Hop Albums (Billboard)	25
