= Love Scars II =

Studio album by Yung Bleu
- Released: April 14, 2023
- Recorded: 2022–2023
- Genre: Hip-hop; R&B
- Length: 42:40
- Label: Empire; Moon Boy
- Producer: Adam Korbesmeyer; Aifo; David Keiffer Johnston; FrancisGotHeat; Hitmaka; Jake Mende Fridkis; Jeremy Lawrence; Jerry Lang II; Kiko; Magnificent Curry; Moon Boy Productions; Nathan Mansour; Nathan Rhoads; OG Parker; OneTakeJake; Rhyan Douglas; Rob Holladay; Robert Weinacker Hale; Ted; Tee Romano; Teldrick Aundrice Smith; Xy; Young Nato

Yung Bleu chronology
Tantra (2022)	Love Scars II (2023)	Jeremy (2024)

Singles from Love Scars II
- 1. "Games Women Play" Released: February 14, 2023; 2. "Stingy" Released: February 24, 2023; 3. "Kissing on Your Tattoos" Released: April 7, 2023

Love Scars II is the third studio album by American rapper and singer Yung Bleu, released by Empire Distribution and Moon Boy University on April 14, 2023. The album contains guest appearances from Chris Brown, Tink, and Ty Dolla Sign. It was supported by three singles: "Games Women Play", "Stingy", and "Kissing on Your Tattoos". The album peaked at number 38 on the US Billboard 200.

== Background ==
The album serves as the sequel to Yung Bleu's 2020 EP Love Scars: The 5 Stages of Emotions. Shortly before the album's release, Yung Bleu wrote to his fans on social media about the project:

"Without you I am nothing. [...] I love to express myself to you because you never judge me! We got our heart broke together! We healed together. I helped you, and you helped me. It's like our souls are connected somehow. So when I say I love my fans I really do love y'all. Going Through the ups, the downs. We've grown together. Y'all loved my voice, my family. My story. So whether you been here since 2017 or since 'Love Scars Part 1!' Just understand y'all mean a lot to me. Music is definitely therapeutic. Maybe we all need a little therapy. So here I am, again! Exposing myself again. Still here. Exposing my flaws only because you made me feel comfortable enough to do so. Here I am, helping to heal while y'all help to heal me. We all got Love Scars. #EnjoyMyPain #EnjoyMyStory Here I am, unfiltered."

== Track listing ==
Love Scars II track listing
No.	Title	Writer(s)	Producer(s)	Length
1.	"Casamigos Nights"	Jeremy Biddle	Jeremy Lawrence; Jerry Lang II; Robert Weinacker Hale	3:11
2.	"Games Women Play"	Biddle	Lang II; Hale; Ted; Teldrick Aundrice Smith	2:48
3.	"The Way You Rock"	Biddle; Christian J. Ward	Aifo; Hitmaka; Kiko; OG Parker; Tee Romano	2:24
4.	"Lonely Winters"	Biddle	Lang II; Hale; Ted; Smith	3:04
5.	"Waterfalls" (with Ty Dolla Sign)	Biddle; Tyrone Griffin Jr.	Hitmaka; Romano; Xy	2:42
6.	"Under My Spell"	Biddle	Lang II; Moon Boy Productions; Hale; Ted	2:03
7.	"Distant Lover" (with Chris Brown)	Biddle; Ward; Christopher Dotson; Christopher Maurice Brown	FrancisGotHeat; Hitmaka; OG Parker; Rhyan Douglas; Romano; Williams; Xy	2:56
8.	"Angel Dust"	Biddle	David Keiffer Johnston; Jake Mende Fridkis; Lang II; OneTakeJake; Hale	3:03
9.	"2am in Dallas"	Biddle	Nathan Rhoads	3:10
10.	"Can't Help Who You Love"	Biddle; Ward; Ivory Scott	Hitmaka; Magnificent Curry; Rob Holladay	3:49
11.	"Kissing on Your Tattoos"	Biddle	Rhoads	2:34
12.	"Pussy Papa"	Biddle	Rhoads	2:47
13.	"You Got It (Interlude)"	Biddle	Adam Korbesmeyer; Lang II; Hale	2:46
14.	"Till the Death"	Biddle	Lang II; Nathan Mansour; Hale; Young Nato	2:01
15.	"Stingy" (with Tink)	Biddle; Trinity Home	Hitmaka; Rhoads	3:22
Total length:				42:40

== Charts ==
Chart performance for Love Scars II
Chart (2023)	Peak position
US Billboard 200	38
US Top R&B/Hip-Hop Albums (Billboard)	15
