= Tantra (album) =

Studio album by Yung Bleu
- Released: November 11, 2022
- Length: 52:43
- Label: Empire; Moon Boy
- Producer: Yung Bleu; Alexander Tsarng-Shuen Wu; Ayo Awosika; Dnny Phntm; Dson Beats; Elyas; Jeremy Lawrence; Jerry Lang II; Joshua Hui; Julio Fernandez; JulyDaProducer; Mfoss; Murda Beatz; Preme; Robby Hale; Sam Tompkins; Sauce Boy; Synco; Teldrick Smith; TheBoyKam; Vitals

Yung Bleu chronology
Moon Boy (2021)	Tantra (2022)	Love Scars II (2023)

Singles from Tantra
- 1. "Walk Through the Fire" Released: January 21, 2022; 2. "Love in the Way" Released: September 16, 2022; 3. "Life Worth Living" Released: September 21, 2022; 4. "Feel It Inside" Released: January 10, 2023

Tantra is the second studio album by American rapper and singer Yung Bleu. It was released through Empire Distribution and Moon Boy University on November 11, 2022. The album contains guest appearances from Fivio Foreign, Zayn, Nicki Minaj, Kelly Rowland, French Montana, Lucky Daye, Lil Wayne, Ty Dolla Sign, and Ne-Yo. Production was handled by a variety of record producers, including Bleu himself, Murda Beatz, Jerry Lang II, Synco, Robby Hale, Teldrick Smith, and Preme, among others.

== Background ==
In an interview with iHeartRadio, Bleu explained his reasoning behind choosing tantra as the title of the album, stating that he had been "reading things about the Moon and my sign. It's really called 'Moon Magic' and it's like some spiritual stuff so I been reading into it. I wanted it to be called something that people ain’t really know so they could read into it and find out about it. … certain little key things about spirituality and the moon."

== Release and promotion ==
After announcing the album and its cover art on November 4, 2022, Bleu revealed the tracklist for the album four days later.

=== Singles ===
The lead single of the album, "Walk Through the Fire", which features fellow American singer Ne-Yo, was released on January 21, 2022. The second single, "Love in the Way", a collaboration with Trinidadian-American rapper and singer Nicki Minaj, was released on September 16, 2022. The third single, "Life Worth Living", a collaboration with Moroccan-American rapper French Montana, was released on September 28, 2022. The sole promotional single, "Soul Child", which features fellow American rapper Lil Wayne, was released on November 8, 2022. "Feel It Inside" featuring Ty Dolla Sign was sent to rhythmic contemporary radio on January 10, 2023, as the fourth single.

== Track listing ==
Tantra track listing
No.	Title	Writer(s)	Producer(s)	Length
1.	"Don't Forget Me"	Jeremy Biddle	Yung Bleu; Ayo Awosika; Treehouz; Jeremy Lawrence; Jerry Lang II; Robby Hale; Teldrick Smith	3:07
2.	"What Type of Games"	Biddle	Murda Beatz; Elyas	3:03
3.	"One of Those Nights" (with Fivio Foreign)	Biddle; Maxie Ryles III	Yung Bleu; Lang; Hale; T. Smith	4:34
4.	"Fire Inside" (with Zayn)	Biddle; Zayn Malik; Deshawn White	T. Smith; Joshua Hui; Synco; Vitals; Alexander Tsarng-Shuen Wu	2:26
5.	"Fuck Her Face"	Biddle	Murda Beatz; Mfoss	2:32
6.	"The Real Side"	Biddle	Yung Bleu; Lang; Hale; T. Smith	3:06
7.	"Love in the Way" (with Nicki Minaj)	Biddle; Onika Maraj; Sam Tompkins; Daniel Goudie; Rug Wilson; Ashley Milton	Tompkins; Dnny Phntm; Dson Beats; Julio Fernandez; JulyDaProducer; TheBoyKam; Sauce Boy; Preme	3:41
8.	"Freak Freak" (with Kelly Rowland)	Biddle; Kelendria Rowland	Al Geno; Ljay Currie; LC	3:23
9.	"Life Worth Living" (with French Montana)	Biddle; Karim Kharbouch; Donny Flores; White	Yung Bleu; Lang; Hale; t. Smith	3:01
10.	"Rich Killaz"	Biddle	JD on the Track; 22 Cartel	2:43
11.	"Bad Lil Vibe"	Biddle	Yung Bleu; Lang; Hale; T. Smith; Nate Alford; Adam Korbesmeyer	2:59
12.	"Your Love Is Dangerous" (with Lucky Daye)	Biddle; David Brown; Dustin Dowie	Yung Bleu; Lang; Hale; T. Smith; David Johnston	2:49
13.	"Soul Child" (featuring Lil Wayne)	Biddle; Dwayne Carter, Jr.	Ljay Currie; Lil CC; Mike Woods	3:02
14.	"No Good Decisions"	Biddle	Yung Bleu; Lang; Hale; T. Smith; Alford	3:39
15.	"Feel It Inside" (featuring Ty Dolla Sign)	Biddle; Tyrone Griffin, Jr.	James Koo	2:58
16.	"Hard to Find"	Biddle	Yung Bleu; Lang; Hale; T. Smith	2:16
17.	"Walk Through the Fire" (featuring Ne-Yo)	Biddle; Shaffer Smith	Yung Bleu; Lang; Hale; T. Smith	3:19
Total length:				52:43

== Charts ==
Chart performance for Tantra
Chart (2022)	Peak position
US Billboard 200	99
US Top R&B/Hip-Hop Albums (Billboard)	48
