= Wanna Party / World's Mine =

EP by Future Brown
- Released: 2014
- Recorded: The Space Pit Studios
- Genre: Electronic
- Length: 15:25
- Label: Warp
- Producer: Future Brown; MikeQ

Future Brown chronology
Wanna Party / World's Mine (2014)	'Future Brown (2015)

Wanna Party / World's Mine is a 2014 EP by Future Brown, released on Warp Records.

== Track listing ==
No.	Title	Writer(s)	Producer(s)	Length
1.	"Wanna Party" (featuring Tink)	Future Brown, Trinity Home	Future Brown, MikeQ	2:42
2.	"Wanna Party (Remix)" (featuring Tink and 3D Na'Tee)	Future Brown, Trinity Home, Samantha James	Future Brown	2:43
3.	"World's Mine" (featuring Prince Rapid, Dirty Danger and Roachee)	Future Brown, Prince Owusu-Agyekum, David Nkrumah, Richard Roach	Future Brown	5:00
4.	"World's Mine" (Instrumental)	Future Brown	Future Brown	5:00
Total length:				15:25

== Personnel ==
- Fatima Al Qadiri - producer, writer
- Asma Maroof - producer, writer
- Daniel Pineda - producer, writer
- Jamie Imanian-Friedman - producer, writer
- Tink – vocals, rap, performer
- 3D Na'Tee – vocals, rap, performer
- Prince Rapid – vocals, rap, performer
- Dirty Danger – vocals, rap, performer
- Roachee – vocals, rap, performer
- Future Brown - producer
- MikeQ - producer
- Dis – design
- D.V. Caputo - design
- Jeremy Cox - Mixing Engineer
- Dave Kutch – mastering
