= Yung Bleu =

American rapper and singer

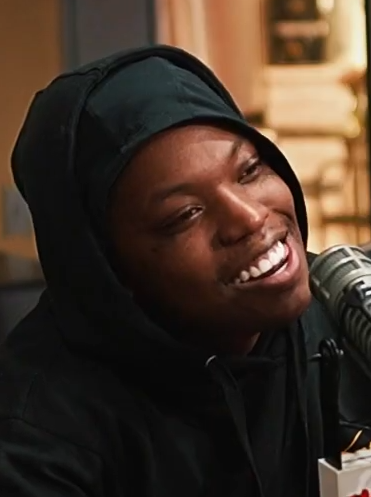
- Yung Bleu in 2024

Background information
- Also known as: Bleu Vandross
- Born: Jeremy Biddle; Mobile, Alabama, U.S.
- Genres: Hip hop; R&B
- Occupations: rapper; singer; songwriter; record producer
- Years active: 2013–present
- Labels: Vandross; Interscope; Epic; Columbia; Bad Azz Music Syndicate; EMPIRE
- Website: yungbleu.com

Jeremy Biddle, known professionally as Yung Bleu or Bleu, is an American rapper and singer. He is best known for his 2020 single "You're Mines Still", which peaked at number 18 on the Billboard Hot 100 after it was remixed by Canadian rapper Drake.

== Life and career ==
Biddle was born and raised in Mobile, Alabama. He started making music in 2013, releasing a string of mixtapes that had his name circulate throughout the Southern scene, and eventually signed a deal with Columbia Records through Boosie Badazz's label Bad Azz Music Syndicate.

In 2017, he came back on the scene with the singles "Miss It" and "Ice on My Baby" from the mixtape Investments 4, which featured a guest appearance from YoungBoy Never Broke Again. In 2018, he released a remix for "Miss It" featuring Kid Ink and for "Ice on My Baby" featuring Kevin Gates.

In 2020, he released the mixtape Inv 5 and the EP Bleu Vandross, which were his last releases under Columbia Records and Bad Azz Music. Later that year, he signed a deal with Empire Distribution and a management deal with Meek Mill's label Dream Chasers Records. The same year, he released the EP Love Scars: The 5 Stages of Emotions, which included the single "You're Mines Still". A remix for "You're Mines Still" featuring Canadian rapper and singer Drake was released through OVO Sound on October 16, 2020, after the two artists were connected by basketball player DeMarcus Cousins. The remix peaked at number 18 on the Billboard Hot 100, which helped Love Scars: The 5 Stages of Emotions to enter the Billboard 200 chart. In October 2023, Yung Bleu was arrested after bodyslamming his mother in her home.

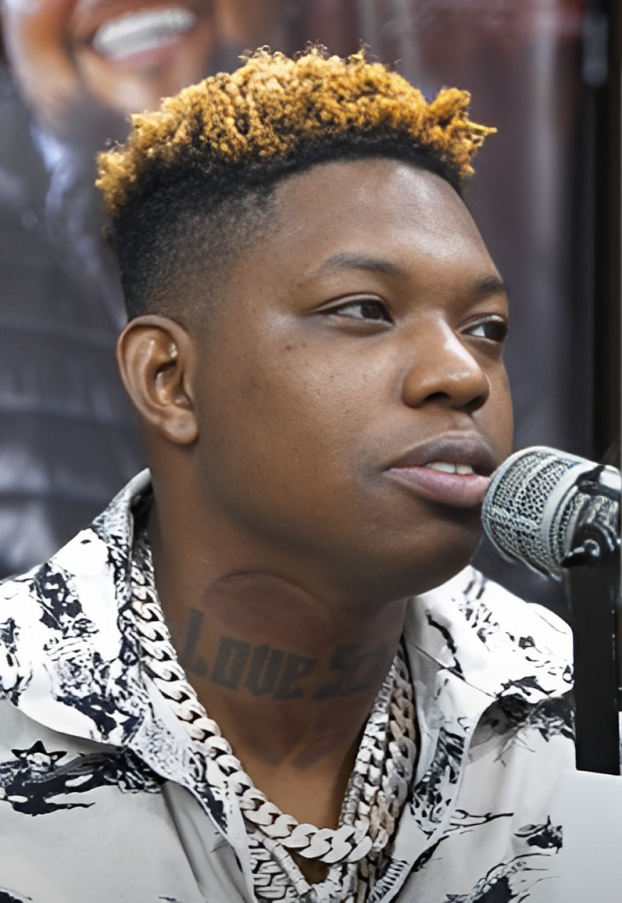
Yung Bleu in an interview with WHTA in 2021

In 2021, Biddle released the singles "Thieves in Atlanta" featuring Coi Leray, "Baddest" featuring Chris Brown and 2 Chainz, and "Way More Close (Stuck in a Box)" featuring Big Sean. All of the three songs appeared on Biddle's debut album Moon Boy, released on July 23 of the same year. The album features guest appearances from Drake, Gunna, Big Sean, Kehlani, Chris Brown, 2 Chainz, A Boogie wit da Hoodie, Moneybagg Yo, H.E.R., and Kodak Black.

On September 16, 2022, he released "Love in the Way" with Nicki Minaj, the lead single from his second studio album Tantra, which was released on November 11, 2022. The album also includes guest appearances by Fivio Foreign, Lucky Daye, Ty Dolla $ign, Ne-Yo, Zayn, Kelly Rowland and Lil Wayne. He released a follow-up five months later, named Love Scars II, a sequel to his 2020 EP, with guest appearances by Ty Dolla $ign, Tink, and Chris Brown.

== Discography ==
Yung Bleu discography
- Studio albums: 3
- EPs: 6
- Singles: 29
- Mixtapes: 8

=== Studio albums ===
Title	Album details	Peak chart positions			Certifications
Title	Album details	US	US R&B/HH	US Rap	Certifications
Moon Boy	Released: July 23, 2021; Label: Vandross Music Group, Empire; Format: Digital download, streaming	12	7	6	RIAA: Gold
Tantra	Released: November 11, 2022; Label: Empire, Moon Boy University; Format: Digital download, streaming	99	48	—	
Love Scars II	Released: April 14, 2023; Label: Empire, Moon Boy University; Format: Digital download, streaming	38	15	—	
Jeremy	Released: April 26, 2024; Label: Empire, Vandross Music Group; Format: Digital download, streaming	51	—	—	
"—" denotes a recording that did not chart or was not released in that territory.

=== Mixtapes ===
Title	Mixtape details
Investments	Released: September 29, 2015; Label: F.A.B. Nation; Format: Digital download, streaming
Investments 2	Released: May 12, 2016; Label: F.A.B. Nation; Format: Digital download, streaming
Investments 3	Released: December 2, 2016; Label: Bad Azz; Format: Digital download, streaming
Bleu Da Ruler	Released: May 5, 2017; Label: Bad Azz; Format: Digital download, streaming
Investments 4	Released: September 12, 2017; Label: Bad Azz; Format: Digital download, streaming
Investments 5	Released: February 14, 2018; Label: Bad Azz; Format: Digital download, streaming
Investments 6	Released: September 20, 2019; Label: Columbia; Format: Digital download, streaming
Bleu Vandross 3	Released: August 28, 2020; Label: Empire; Format: Digital download, streaming

=== Extended plays ===
Title	EP details	Peak chart positions	
Title	EP details	US	US R&B/HH
Bleu Vandross	Released: April 5, 2018; Label: Bad Azz; Format: Digital download, streaming	—	—
Bleu Vandross 2	Released: February 14, 2019; Label: Columbia; Format: Digital download, streaming	—	—
Throw Aways	Released: August 16, 2019; Label: Self-released; Format: Digital download, streaming	—	—
Since We Inside	Released: April 30, 2020; Label: Empire; Format: Digital download, streaming	—	—
Love Scars: The 5 Stages of Emotions	Released: October 16, 2020; Label: Empire; Format: Digital download, streaming	82	44
No, I'm Not Ok	Released: December 17, 2021; Label: Empire; Format: Digital download, streaming	—	—

=== Singles ===
==== As lead artist ====
List of singles as lead artist
Title	Year	Peak chart positions									Certifications	Album
Title	Year	US	US R&B/ HH	US R&B	US Rap	CAN	NZ Hot	UK	UK R&B	WW	Certifications	Album
"Miss It" (solo or remix with Kid Ink)	2017	— (Note: "Miss It" did not reach the US Hot 100, but peaked at number 12 on the Bubbling Under Hot 100.)	—	—	—	—	—	—	—	—	RIAA: Platinum	Bleu Da Ruler
"Man Man Man" (with Twinn U and Jo Slo)	2017	—	—	—	—	—	—	—	—	—		Non-album single
"Ice on My Baby" (solo or remix featuring Kevin Gates)	2018	—	—	—	—	—	—	—	—	—	RIAA: Gold	Investments 5
"On Cam" (featuring Moneybagg Yo)	2018	—	—	—	—	—	—	—	—	—		Bleu Money
"Unappreciated"	2018	—	—	—	—	—	—	—	—	—	RIAA: Gold	Bleu Vandross
"Elevatorz" (featuring PnB Rock)	2019	—	—	—	—	—	—	—	—	—		Investmens 6
"Boyz II Men"	2020	—	—	—	—	—	—	—	—	—		Non-album single
"Running Out of Love"	2020	—	—	—	—	—	—	—	—	—		Blue Vandross 3
"You're Mines Still" (featuring Drake)	2020	18	10	3	—	36	9	45	22	67	RIAA: 2× Platinum; BPI: Gold	Love Scars: The 5 Stages of Emotions and Moon Boy
"2AM in Houston"	2020	—	—	—	—	—	—	—	—	—		Love Scars: The 5 Stages of Emotions
"Come Over" (with Ann Marie)	2020	—	—	—	—	—	—	—	—	—		Non-album single
"Build a Bae" (with Muni Long)	2020	—	—	—	—	—	—	—	—	—		Nobody Knows
"Ghetto Love Birds" (solo or remix featuring A Boogie wit da Hoodie)	2021	—	—	—	—	—	—	—	—	—		Moon Boy
"Thieves in Atlanta" (featuring Coi Leray)	2021	—	—	—	—	—	—	—	—	—		Non-album single
"You Got It" (Remix) (with VEDO)	2021	—	—	—	—	—	—	—	—	—		Non-album single
"Baddest" (featuring Chris Brown and 2 Chainz)	2021	56	17	—	12	—	38	—	—	—	RIAA: Gold	Moon Boy
"Way More Close (Stuck in a Box)" (featuring Big Sean)	2021	—	—	18	—	—	—	—	—	—		Moon Boy
"Selfish" (with Tink)	2021	—	—	—	—	—	—	—	—	—		Heat of the Moment
"Beautiful Lies" (with Kehlani)	2021	65	20	5	—	—	—	—	—	—		Moon Boy
"Fans Go Crazy" (with Money Man)	2021	—	—	—	—	—	—	—	—	—		Non-album single
"Walk Through the Fire" (with Ne-Yo)	2022	—	—	—	—	—	—	—	—	—		Tantra
"Drip" (with Bored Brothers)	2022	—	—	—	—	—	—	—	—	—		Non-album single
"No Limit" (with Money Man and Key Glock featuring Babyface Ray)	2022	—	—	—	—	—	—	—	—	—		Non-album single
"Love in the Way" (with Nicki Minaj)	2022	93	25	11	—	—	24	—	—	—		Tantra
"Life Worth Living" (with French Montana)	2022	—	—	—	—	—	—	—	—	—		Tantra
"Feel It Inside" (featuring Ty Dolla Sign)	2023	—	—	—	—	—	—	—	—	—		Tantra
"Games Women Play"	2023	—	—	—	—	—	—	—	—	—		
"Stingy" (with Tink)	2023	—	—	—	—	—	—	—	—	—		
"Kissing On Your Tattoos"	2023	—	—	—	—	—	—	—	—	—		

==== As featured artist ====
List of singles as featured artist
Title	Year	Peak chart positions	Album
Title	Year	US R&B/ HH Air.	Album
"Mudd" (Boosie Badazz featuring Rich Homie Quan and Yung Bleu)	2016	–	Happy Thanksgiving and Merry Christmas
"Tomb Raider" (Hogg Booma featuring Yung Bleu)	2016	–	Non-album single
"Til I Came Up" (Hogg Booma featuring Yung Bleu)	2016	–	Non-album single
"Goin In" (Puncho featuring Yung Bleu)	2017	–	Non-album single
"Wild" (Them Bama Boyz featuring Yung Bleu)	2017	–	The Take Over
"We Was Broke" (DJ Chose featuring Yung Bleu)	2018	–	Non-album single
"24/7" (Shad Levi featuring Yung Bleu)	2018	–	Upper Echelon
"Him" (Remix) (Pikasso featuring Yung Bleu)	2018	–	Non-album single
"Nann" (D-Shep featuring Yung Bleu)	2018	–	Non-album single
"Distractions" (Lil' Nathan and The Zydeco Big Timers featuring Yung Bleu)	2018	–	Winning
"Twisted Fantasy" (Allan Cubas featuring Yung Bleu)	2018	–	Non-album single
"Unsure" (DJ Megan Ryte featuring Joey Badass, Yung Bleu, and Arin Ray)	2019	–	Non-album single
"Special Somebody" (Remix) (Prince Bopp featuring Yung Bleu)	2019	–	Non-album single
"Just in Case" (Ar'mon & Trey featuring Yung Bleu)	2019	–	Non-album single
"Drop Top" (Lil Coop featuring Yung Bleu)	2019	–	Non-album single
"Victim" (Yung OG featuring Yung Bleu)	2020	–	Non-album single
"My Story" (Da Captain featuring Yung Bleu)	2020	–	Non-album single
"Territory" (Tenille Arts featuring Yung Bleu)	2020	–	Non-album single
"I Luv It" (Bianca Clarke featuring Yung Bleu)	2020	–	Non-album single
"Tweakin'" (C-NILE featuring Yung Bleu)	2020	–	Back in da Lab
"Hate Me" (Aleksa Safiya featuring Yung Bleu)	2020	–	Introspection
"Beat da Odds" (Remix) (Nowayy featuring Yung Bleu)	2020	–	Non-album single
"Broken Scars" (JokaDaBoss featuring Yung Bleu and Brabra)	2021	–	Non-album single
"A Million Reasons" (Kelzhaunne featuring Yung Bleu)	2021	–	Non-album single
"Nasty Nasty" (Plies featuring Yung Bleu)	2021	–	Non-album single
"Track Star (Remix)" (Mooski, Chris Brown, and A Boogie wit da Hoodie featuring Yung Bleu)	2021	–	Melodic Therapy 4 the Broken
"Read My Mind" (Lonr. featuring Yung Bleu)	2021	–	Land of Nothing Real 2
"VVS" (Chicken P featuring Yung Bleu)	2021	–	Non-album single
"Trying" (DJ Chose featuring Yung Bleu)	2021	–	Multi
"Stay Down" (Ne-Yo featuring Yung Bleu)	2021	34	Self Explanatory
"3am" (Ceo Verse featuring Yung Bleu)	2022	–	My Advice Is, Live Life
"UonU" (Kaliii featuring Yung Bleu)	2022	–	Toxic Chocolate
"Talk 2 Me Nice" (David S Gray featuring Runtown and Yung Bleu)	2022	–	Non-album single
"Better" (Rasta Papii featuring Yung Bleu)	2022	–	Non-album single
"Do Not Disturb" (Vory featuring Nav and Yung Bleu)	2022	–	Lost Souls
"Marvin the Martian" (RoadRunna Nino featuring Yung Bleu)	2022	–	Non-album single
"One Light" (Remix) (Maroon 5 and Bantu featuring Yung Bleu and Latto)	2022	–	Non-album single

=== Other charted songs ===
List of other charted songs, with selected chart positions, showing year released and album name
Title	Year	Peak chart positions					Album
Title	Year	US	US R&B/ HH	US R&B	US Rap	WW	Album
"This Feeling" (Moneybagg Yo and Ja'niyah featuring Yung Bleu)	2021	–	– (Note: "This Feeling" did not enter the Hot R&B/Hip-Hop Songs chart but peaked at number 21 on the R&B/Hip-Hop Digital Song Sales chart.)	–	– (Note: "This Feeling" did not enter the Hot Rap Songs chart but peaked at number 15 on the Rap Digital Song Sales chart.)	–	A Gangsta's Pain: Reloaded
"Die Alone" (Gunna and Chris Brown featuring Yung Bleu)	2022	92	38	–	25	143	DS4Ever
"Possessive" (Chris Brown featuring Lil Wayne and Yung Bleu)	2022	98	31	9	–	–	Breezy
"—" denotes a recording that did not chart or was not released in that territory.

=== Guest appearances ===
Title	Year	Other artist(s)	Album
"Let Me Know"	2017	Boosie Badazz	BooPac
"Semi on Me"	2017	Boosie Badazz	BooPac
"Ride For Me"	2019	Ann Marie	Tripolar 2
"Dope Boy"	2019	Asian Doll	Fight Night
"Falling"	2020	TEC	Web Life Vol.3
"Bipolar"	2020	T-Rell	Smile Through It
"Friendly"	2020	K Camp	Kiss Five
"Perfect"	2021	Lakeyah	In Due Time
"Trance"	2021	YSL Records, Karlae	Slime Language 2
"More Than Average"	2021	Taleban Dooda	Fallen Angel
"Paradise"	2021	H.E.R.	Back of My Mind
"Nobody"	2021	Azjah	1:03 AM
"Build A Bae"	2021	Muni Long	Nobody Knows
"Polaroid"	2021	Rotimi	All or Nothing
"Changes"	2021	Ann Marie	Hate Love
"This Feeling"	2021	Moneybagg Yo, Ja'niyah	A Gangsta's Pain: Reloaded
"Worthless"	2021	Money Man	Blockchain
"Beat It"	2021	Smiley	Buy or Bye 2
"Bitter"	2021	LPB Poody	I'm The One
"What You Need"	2021	Dusty Locane	Untamed
"Die Alone"	2022	Gunna, Chris Brown	DS4Ever
"Aye Yai Yai"	2022	Coi Leray	Trendsetter
"World Watching"	2022	Fivio Foreign, Lil Tjay	B.I.B.L.E.
"Find My Way"	2022	Hd4president	Find My Way
"4 Letter Word"	2022	MTM DonDon	Mixed Emotions
"Who Are We"	2022	M Huncho	Chasing Euphoria
"Babysitter"	2022	Lobby Boyz, Jim Jones, Maino	The Lobby Boyz
"Possessive"	2022	Chris Brown, Lil Wayne	Breezy
"10:55"	2023	NandoSTL	Year of the Ape
