= Tristan Wilds =

American actor & musician (born 1989)

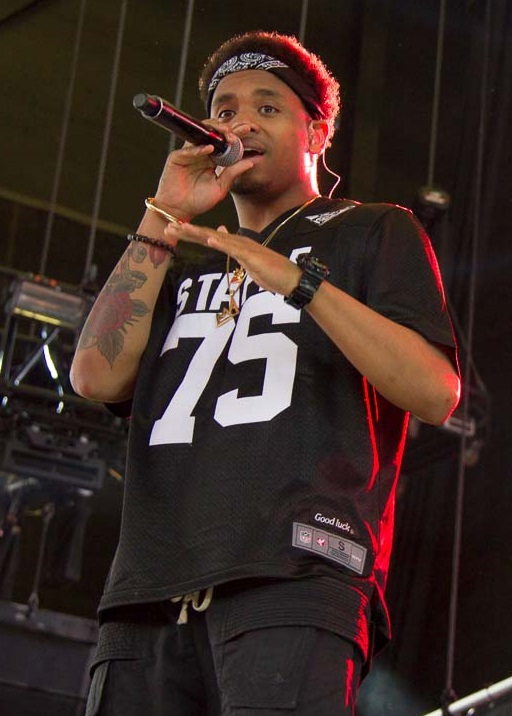
- Wilds performing in 2014

Background information
- Also known as: Mack Wilds
- Born: Tristan Paul Mack Wilds; July 15, 1989 (age 37); Staten Island, New York, U.S.
- Occupations: Actor, singer-songwriter, record producer
- Years active: 2005–present
- Labels: The Ninety Five Percent; EMPIRE (current); Louder Than Life; Epic; Sony RED (former)

Tristan Paul Mack Wilds (born July 15, 1989) is an American actor, singer-songwriter, and record producer. He is known for his roles as Michael Lee on the HBO original drama series, The Wire, and as Dixon Wilson on the CW teen drama series, 90210. He was also featured in the Adele music video for "Hello". As a recording artist, he signed with record producer Salaam Remi's Louder than Life Recordings, an imprint of Sony Music to release his debut studio album, New York: A Love Story (2013), which narrowly entered the Billboard 200 and received a nomination for Best Urban Contemporary Album at the 56th Annual Grammy Awards. Wilds' second album, AfterHours (2017), was released independently, and failed to chart.

== Early life and education ==
Wilds was born and grew up in Stapleton, Staten Island, New York City. His mother, Monique Moncion, is of Afro-Dominican and Irish descent, and his father, Paul Wilds, is African-American. His mother was first a beautician and then a stockbroker. Wilds attended and graduated from the Michael J. Petrides School in Staten Island.

== Acting career ==
His acting debut came in Miracle's Boys, a drama mini-series produced by Spike Lee on The N (now called TeenNick). He also made guest appearances on television shows such as Cold Case and Law & Order. In 2006, Wilds made his film debut in a bit-role in the independent drama film Half Nelson alongside Academy Award nominee Ryan Gosling. That same year, Wilds joined the cast of the HBO drama television series, The Wire (then into its fourth season) in a major recurring role as Michael Lee, a smart but troubled middle school student who lives in poverty and cares for his younger brother.

In 2007, Wilds appeared in the music videos for songs such as "Roc Boys", "Teenage Love Affair" and "Ghetto Mindstate", among others. In 2008, he appeared alongside Queen Latifah, Alicia Keys, and Dakota Fanning in The Secret Life of Bees, the film adaptation of the novel of the same name. Soon after his run on The Wire, he attended an acting workshop at the Roundabout Theatre Company where he worked alongside actress, Phylicia Rashad in productions of Stockholm Brooklyn and Wool at the Cherry Lane Theatre.

In 2008, Wilds returned to television in The CW's teen drama series, 90210, a spin-off of Beverly Hills, 90210. He played Dixon Wilson, a teenage boy who is adopted and moves with his family to Beverly Hills. The show ran until 2013, with Wilds appearing in all but three of its 114 episodes. In March 2009, he secured a role in the George Lucas-produced war film Red Tails. The film follows the Tuskegee Airmen, a group of African American United States Army Air Force (USAAF) servicemen, during World War II. Wilds portrayed Ray "Ray Gun" Knight. The film, which also starred Cuba Gooding, Jr. and Terrence Howard, was eventually released in January 2012 after numerous push-backs.

In 2015, Wilds starred as Adele's love interest in the music video for her song, "Hello", directed by Xavier Dolan. In early 2016, he starred in the VH1 television movie, The Breaks about the hip-hop industry in the 1990s. On the heels of its successful January TV movie premiere, VH1 greenlighted a full first season for the hip-hop drama, which started airing in 2017. That year, Wilds also played Officer Beck, the Black officer at the center of the controversial shooting of a young white male in a racially charged town in the TV show Shots Fired.

== Music career ==
Wilds met producer Salaam Remi in 2008 at the BMI Awards, which sparked Wilds' initial interest in becoming a music artist. In 2010, Wilds signed a recording contract with independent record label, Ten2one. He released several singles, including "2 Girlz" which was featured on the fourth season of his TV show, 90210. The song Fall 4 Her was produced by Rico Love. Wilds' debut EP, Remember Remember, was released toward the end of 2011.

Wilds began working with Salaam Remi on his debut studio album in 2012. He signed to Remi's Sony Music imprint, Louder than Life, that same year. He released the first single off the album, "Own It," in June 2013. The album, New York: A Love Story, was released in September 2013. It was well received by critics earning a Grammy nomination for the Best Urban Contemporary Album at the 56th Grammy Awards in 2014. The album would lose to Rihanna's Unapologetic. In November 2015, Wilds released the first single, "Love in the 90z", off his second album AfterHours. In March 2016, it was announced that Wilds had signed a management deal with Roc Nation.

== Discography ==
=== Studio albums ===
List of studio albums, with selected chart positions
Title	Album details	Peak chart positions				
Title	Album details	US	US Hip-Hop	US R&B	US Indie	US Heat
New York: A Love Story	Released: September 30, 2013; Label: Louder Than Life, Sony RED; Formats: CD, Digital Download	179	28	15	36	7
AfterHours	Released: April 7, 2017; Label: The Ninety Five Percent, EMPIRE; Formats: CD, Digital Download	—	—	—	46	15
"—" denotes a title that did not chart, or was not released in that territory.

=== Singles ===
List of singles, with selected chart positions and certifications, showing year released and album name
Title	Year	Peak chart positions			Album
Title	Year	US	US R&B	US Heat	Album
"Own It"	2013	—	35	18	New York: A Love Story
"Henny"	2014	—	—	—	New York: A Love Story
"Love in the 90z"	2016	—	—	—	AfterHours
"—" denotes a recording that did not chart or was not released in that territory.

=== Guest appearances ===
List of guest appearances
Title	Year	Other performer(s)	Album
"Situationships"	2013	Fabolous, Tiara Thomas	The Soul Tape 3
"Banned From Radio"	2014	Maino, Bodega Bamz, Chinx, Troy Ave, City Boy Dee	—N/a
"Debut"	2014	DJ Prostyle	—N/a
"Low"	2014	Mobb Deep	The Infamous Mobb Deep
"Henny (Remix)"	2014	Mobb Deep, Busta Rhymes, French Montana	The Infamous Mobb Deep
"All About You"	2014	Maino	King of Brooklyn 2
"Bottle Girl (Remix)"	2014	Consequence, Blue Gem	Movies on Demand 5
"Good Money"	2015	N.O.R.E., Troy Ave, Tweez, City Boy Dee	Drinks
"Act Like That"	2015	Bridget Kelly	—N/a
"50 Shots"	2015	Method Man, Streetlife, Cory Gunz	The Meth Lab
"Troubled Times"	2016	Torae	Entitled
"Money Dance II"	2016	J.U.S.T.I.C.E. League, Rick Ross, Camp Lo	—N/a

== Filmography ==
=== Film ===
Year	Title	Role	Notes
2006	Half Nelson	Jamal	
2008	The Secret Life of Bees	Zach Taylor	
2012	Red Tails	2nd Lt. Ray "Ray Gun" Gannon	
2020	Really Love	Nick Wright	
2023	Praise This	Pastor Nick "P.G." Goodman	
2025	Both Eyes Open	Owen	

=== Television ===
Year	Title	Role	Notes
2005	Miracle's Boys	A.J.	3 episodes
2006–08	The Wire	Michael Lee	22 episodes
2007	Cold Case	Skill Jones (2002)	Episode: ""8:03 AM"
2008	Law & Order	Will Manning	Episode: "Driven"
2008–13	90210	Dixon Wilson	111 episodes
2016	The Breaks	DeeVee	Television film
2016	Dinner in America with Brett Gelman	Himself	Television special
2017	The Breaks	DeeVee	8 episodes
2017	Shots Fired	Deputy Joshua Beck	10 episodes
2018	Dinner for Two	Chris	Television film
2019	Tales	Kayron	Episode: "Deep Cover"
2021	Swagger	Alonzo Powers	
2022	Profiled: The Black Man	Host	4-part documentary
2026	The Ms. Pat Show	Professor Christian DeWalt	3 episodes

=== Music video ===
Year	Title	Artist	Director
2007	"Teenage Love Affair"	Alicia Keys	Chris Robinson
2007	"Roc Boys"	Jay-Z	Chris Robinson
2011	"How to Love"	Lil Wayne	Chris Robinson
2015	"Hello"	Adele	Xavier Dolan

=== Web ===
Year	Title	Role	Notes
2013	Black Actress	Jared Smith	Episode 5

== Awards and nominations ==
=== Film ===
Year	Award	Category	Work	Result
2008	Black Reel Awards	Breakthrough Performance	The Secret Life of Bees	Nominated
2019	Newark International Film Festival	Best Actor in a Narrative Short	Fifteen	Won

=== Television ===
Year	Award	Category	Work	Result
2009	Teen Choice Awards	Choice TV Breakout Star: Male	90210	Nominated
2010	Teen Choice Awards	Choice TV Actor Drama	90210	Nominated
2011	ALMA Awards	Favorite TV Actor – Supporting Role	90210	Nominated
2012	Prism Award	Drama Series Multi-Episode Storyline – Substance Use	90210	Nominated
2012	Prism Award	Male Performance in a Drama Series Multi-Episode Storyline	90210	Nominated
2017	NAACP Image Awards	Outstanding Actor in a Television Movie, Limited Series or Dramatic Special	Shots Fired	Nominated

=== Music ===
Year	Award	Category	Work	Result
2014	Grammy Awards	Best Urban Contemporary Album	New York: A Love Story	Nominated
2014	BET Awards	Best New Artist	Mack Wilds	Nominated
2017	Soul Train Music Awards	Soul Train Certified Award	Mack Wilds	Nominated

== See also ==
- List of Afro-Latinos
