= Tim Vocals =

American rapper

- Born: Timothy Hodge; 1984 (age 41–42)
- Occupations: Singer, rapper, songwriter

Timothy Hodge (born October 17, 1985), better known by his stage name Tim Vocals, is an American recording artist, singer, rapper, and songwriter. He became an internet sensation in 2013, appearing in various a cappella freestyle videos, performing what would later be recognized as his signature "g-mixes". Over the next year, he released three mixtapes: Live From Harlem, Timtationz, and Tim's Up, Hoes Down, which were critically acclaimed. His musical style has been referred to as "gangsta R&B", blending elements of gangsta rap and contemporary R&B. He has performed and collaborated with contemporary artists such as Nino Man, Chief Keef, and Pusha T, among others, and has been featured and praised in articles and interviews by Rolling Stone magazine, Spin, Vibe, The Fader, Village Voice, and The New York Times. In 2015, Tim signed with Next Records and released his debut LP, R.N.B., to critical acclaim.
