= Montero (album) =

2021 studio album by Lil Nas X

Studio album by Lil Nas X
- Released: September 17, 2021
- Recorded: 2019–2020
- Genre: Pop rap
- Length: 41:17
- Label: Columbia
- Producers: Take a Daytrip; Omer Fedi; Roy Lenzo; Jasper Harris; Tom Levesque; Kanye West; Nick Lee; Blake Slatkin; Ryan Tedder; KBeaZy; Jasper Sheff; John Cunningham; Carter Lang; Nick Mira; DT

Lil Nas X chronology
| 7 (2019) | Montero (2021) | Days Before Dreamboy (2025) |

Singles from Montero
- 1. "Montero (Call Me by Your Name)" Released: March 26, 2021; 2. "Sun Goes Down" Released: May 21, 2021; 3. "Industry Baby" Released: July 23, 2021; 4. "Thats What I Want" Released: September 17, 2021; 5. "Lost in the Citadel" Released: April 8, 2022

Montero (stylized in all caps) is the debut studio album by American rapper Lil Nas X, released on September 17, 2021, by Columbia Records. The album has guest appearances from Jack Harlow, Doja Cat, Elton John, Megan Thee Stallion, and Miley Cyrus, while its production was primarily helmed by frequent collaborators Take A Daytrip, as well as Ryan Tedder, Tom Levesque, Kanye West, Nick Mira and Carter Lang, among others. Musically, Montero is a pop rap record with influence from various other genres. Its title is derived from Lil Nas X's real first name.

It received critical acclaim from music critics, who praised its eclectic production and catchy songwriting. Commercially, the album topped the charts in Australia, Denmark, Ireland, New Zealand, Norway, and Sweden. It peaked at number two on the US Billboard 200, also entering the top 10 in numerous other territories. Five singles supported Montero: the lead single "Montero (Call Me by Your Name)", "Sun Goes Down", "Industry Baby", "Thats What I Want", and "Lost in the Citadel". "Montero (Call Me by Your Name)" and "Industry Baby" topped the U.S. Billboard Hot 100, while "Thats What I Want" peaked within the top ten.

At the 64th Annual Grammy Awards, it received a nomination for Album of the Year making his second nomination in three years in the category, while "Montero (Call Me by Your Name)" was nominated for Record of the Year, Song of the Year and Best Music Video, and "Industry Baby" was nominated for Best Melodic Rap Performance, respectively. Lil Nas X also performed "Dead Right Now" during the ceremony.

== Background ==
In 2018, Lil Nas X released his song "Old Town Road", which set a record for the longest-charting number-one song on the Billboard Hot 100. However, with some people dismissing his success as a one-hit wonder, Lil Nas X wanted to depart from the country trap sound of "Old Town Road" when working on his debut album; instead, he focused on rap, pop, and R&B, influenced by Drake, Nicki Minaj, Katy Perry, Miley Cyrus, and Doja Cat. After releasing the EP 7, he said he was working on an album, noting that it was going to be more personal. In early 2020, he asked Take a Daytrip, a production duo who helped with 7, to produce his debut album, and started recording a series of demos during the 2020 COVID-19 lockdowns.

Months into production, Lil Nas X teased the album's lead single "Montero (Call Me by Your Name)" on Twitter, with positive reception. The track was later teased again in a Super Bowl commercial for Swiss hardware manufacturer Logitech, before its release was announced publicly alongside a music video directed by the Ukrainian music video director Tanu Muino on March 26, 2021. The album's second single "Sun Goes Down" came shortly after on May 21, 2021, which followed the theme of homosexuality seen in much of the final release. Both tracks were performed on Saturday Night Live just a day later on May 22, 2021. After the release of "Montero (Call Me by Your Name)," the popular art collective MSCHF partnered with Lil Nas X to release a modified version of the Nike Air Max 97 dubbed Satan Shoes which were temporally available on MSCHF's website. Nike was quick to sue MSCHF, which lead to a court case that was settled a month later. As a promotional technique for the project's third single "Industry Baby", Lil Nas X took to TikTok to announce that a mock court hearing would be held on the single's release date on July 23, 2021. The announcement was bundled with a promotional video featuring a fake court hearing which acted as the precursor to the song's music video, directed by Christian Breslauer of the music video production company London Alley. An early version of the album was leaked with unfinished versions of songs online on July 27. Also, 13 songs were leaked by the same person that never made it to the final release.

On August 26, 2021, Lil Nas X formally announced Montero in a promotional skit posted onto his YouTube channel. In the promotional video, the track "Thats What I Want" was teased as the album's fourth single. On September 17, 2021, the song and its accompanying music video was released along with the rest of the project. Sony Music Italy released "Lost in the Citadel" for radio airplay in Italy on April 8, 2022, as the album's fifth single.

== Music and lyrics ==
Montero has been described as a pop rap and pop-punk record. Primarily rooted in hip-hop and pop, the hook-dominated album incorporates trap beats and distorted hard rock, and draws elements from 2000s R&B and stadium ballads.

== Release and promotion ==
On March 26, 2021, following the release of "Montero (Call Me by Your Name)", Lil Nas X announced the title of the album Montero on Twitter, along with a 2021 release date. On June 29, 2021, a parody of the Marvel Studios production logo was uploaded to YouTube as a new trailer for the album featuring various clips from the music videos of his singles. On August 23, 2021, a partnership with Taco Bell to promote the album was announced, with Lil Nas X playing a role in "menu innovations". The album's release date was announced through another teaser video uploaded to YouTube on August 26, 2021. The video acted as a continuation of the music video for the third single "Industry Baby".

The track listing was announced on September 1, 2021. Alongside the announcement, collaborations with Doja Cat, Elton John, Megan Thee Stallion, and Miley Cyrus were revealed. In early September 2021, Lil Nas X participated in a fake pregnancy photoshoot, with the supposed baby being his album. He was inspired to do so by Megan Thee Stallion's verse on the track "Dolla Sign Slime". To accompany this, he created a "baby registry" which was used to gather donations for various LGBTQ charities. The album cover was created by artists Pilar Zeta and Charlotte Rutherford.

Montero was released on September 17, 2021, by Columbia Records. The album's launch was preceded by a livestream on YouTube showing Lil Nas X being interviewed by Montero, played by himself, on a fictional daytime talk show titled The Montero Show, before being sent to the hospital in an emergency to "give birth to his album".

== Tour ==
On April 26, 2022, Lil Nas X announced a concert tour to support the debut album, Montero. The tour, titled Long Live Montero Tour, was his first headlining concert tour, beginning on September 6, 2022, in Detroit, and concluded on November 17, 2022, in Barcelona. Tickets for North American dates went on sale on April 29, 2022, with European dates on May 6, 2022. Mobile payment service, Cash App, held pre-sales for North American dates on April 27 via Ticketmaster. In early September 2022, the artist announced that he would play an exclusive show in Sydney. The show took place at the Hordern Pavilion on January 4, 2023.

== Critical reception ==
Professional ratings
Aggregate scores
| Source | Rating |
|---|---|
| AnyDecentMusic? | 7.8/10 |
| Metacritic | 85/100 |
Review scores
| Source | Rating |
| AllMusic | 4.5/5 stars |
| Clash | 9/10 |
| Entertainment Weekly | A− |
| Exclaim! | 4/5 stars |
| The Guardian | 5/5 stars |
| The Independent | 5/5 stars |
| The Line of Best Fit | 10/10 |
| NME | 3/5 stars |
| Pitchfork | 7.1/10 |
| Rolling Stone | 3.5/5 stars |

Montero received acclaim from music critics, who often commended its bold and heartfelt subject matter, and the eclectic production. At Metacritic, which assigns a normalized rating out of 100 to reviews from professional publications, the album received an average score of 85 based on 19 reviews, indicating "universal acclaim". Aggregator AnyDecentMusic? gave it 7.8 out of 10, based on their assessment of the critical consensus.

Mike Wass of Variety praises how the project isn't shy to "give voice to the fears and longings of a generation of queer kids", citing the project's lead single "Montero (Call Me by Your Name)" to be "one of the most defiantly queer chart-toppers of all time" and that the track ranks as "the ultimate earworm on the album". Meanwhile, Alexis Petridis of The Guardian gave the album a five-star review in which he praised the album's lyrics, variety and change in tone halfway through, while also noting the album rollout's use of product placement, citing prominent advertising for American fast-food giant Taco Bell and the popular food delivery app Uber Eats. Melissa Ruggieri of USA Today highlighted the work of production duo Take a Daytrip, praising how the duo "pilot his music through valleys of beats and peaks of melody" and how it leads to "a pleasant exploratory ride" throughout the duration of the project. Eric Torres of Pitchfork comments that Montero helps "fulfills the promise of [turning Lil Nas X into] a new kind of pop star", mentioning that the album's contents are "radio-primed to work well beside Olivia Rodrigo's pop-punk or Doja's earworm rap".

Reviewing the album for AllMusic, Neil Z. Yeung called it "A breath of fresh air" and "one of those instant classics, packed with as many catchy jams as introspective musings." Concluding the four-star review for Evening Standard, David Smyth stated that "From slinky pop rap on 'Scoop' to tortured rock on 'Life After Salem', he's doing it all, and against the odds, proving that he has a long bright career ahead." At Clash Magazine, Laviea Thomas gave praise to the album, for being "one of 2021’s most daring, riveting, and honest pop statement[s]."

NME's El Hunt was amongst the few reviewers to give a more divided opinion on the album, claiming that "Without visuals to add a knowing wink and a flourish of pop absurdity, it sometimes settles into a comfortable groove of trap-influenced drum beats, moody instrumentals, Frank Ocean-y electric guitars and percussive brass peals." The Observer's Kitty Empire was also mildly critical, stating that she felt Lil Nas X "resorts to mainstream genre cliches rather than razing convention as he did on 'Old Town Road'." Reviewing in his "Consumer Guide" column, Robert Christgau gave Montero a three-star honorable mention and named "Tales of Dominica", "Sun Goes Down", and "Scoop" as highlights, while summing up the release as "fluke country-rap meisterhitman croons songful enough gay pop bildungsalbum for a biz that has yet to generate enough of them".

In June 2022, Rolling Stone ranked Montero #151 on its list of The 200 Greatest Rap Albums of All Time.

=== Year-end lists ===
Select year-end rankings of Montero
| Publication | List | Rank | Ref. |
|---|---|---|---|
| BBC | The 10 Best Albums of 2021 | —N/a | |
| Billboard | The 50 Best Albums of 2021 | 3 | |
| Entertainment Weekly | The 10 Best Albums of 2021 | 8 | |
| The Guardian | The 50 Best Albums of 2021 | 14 | |
| The Independent | The 40 Best Albums of 2021 | 6 | |
| Los Angeles Times | The 10 Best Albums of 2021 | 4 | |
| NME | The 50 Best Albums of 2021 | 20 | |
| Rolling Stone | The 50 Best Albums of 2021 | 6 | |

== Commercial performance ==
Montero was the most pre-added album on Apple Music two weeks preceding its release (August 27 to September 2, 2021), one place ahead of ABBA's Voyage (2021). The album debuted at number two on the Billboard 200 with first-week sales of 126,000 equivalent units, of which 22,000 were pure album sales. The album also spawned three Billboard Hot 100 hits: "Montero (Call Me by Your Name)", which reached No. 1 on April 10, 2021, "Industry Baby", which reached No. 1 on October 23, 2021, and "Thats What I Want", which peaked at No. 8 on April 2, 2022.

== Track listing ==
Montero track listing
| No. | Title | Lyrics | Music | Producer(s) | Length |
|---|---|---|---|---|---|
| 1. | "Montero (Call Me by Your Name)" | Montero Hill | Denzel Baptiste; David Biral; Omer Fedi; Roy Lenzo | Fedi; Lenzo^{[a]}; Take a Daytrip^{[a]} | 2:18 |
| 2. | "Dead Right Now" | Hill | Biral; Baptiste; Jasper Harris; Noel Goring; R.L. Stafford; Thomas James Levesque | Take a Daytrip^{[a]}; Harris; Levesque | 3:41 |
| 3. | "Industry Baby" (featuring Jack Harlow) | Hill; Jackman Harlow | Biral; Baptiste; Harlow; Kanye West; Mark Williams; Nick Lee; Raul Cubina; Lenzo | Take a Daytrip^{[a]}; West; Lee^{[b]} | 3:32 |
| 4. | "Thats What I Want" | Hill | Blake Slatkin; Keegan Bach; Fedi; Ryan Tedder | Slatkin; KBeaZy; Fedi; Tedder | 2:23 |
| 5. | "The Art of Realization" | Hill | Biral; Baptiste; Lenzo; David Dickensen; Drew Sliger; Mervin Hernandez | Take a Daytrip; Lenzo | 0:24 |
| 6. | "Scoop" (featuring Doja Cat) | Hill; Amala Zandile Dlamini | Biral; Baptiste; Lenzo | Take a Daytrip^{[a]}; Lenzo^{[a]}; Sliger^{[c]}; Fedi^{[c]} | 2:54 |
| 7. | "One of Me" (featuring Elton John) | Hill; Ilsey Juber | Jasper Sheff; John Cunningham | John Cunningham^{[a]}; Sheff; Sliger^{[c]}; Take a Daytrip^{[d]}; Kuk Harrell^{[d]} | 2:42 |
| 8. | "Lost in the Citadel" | Hill | Cunningham | Cunningham^{[a]}; Sliger^{[c]} | 2:50 |
| 9. | "Dolla Sign Slime" (featuring Megan Thee Stallion) | Hill; Megan Pete | Biral; Baptiste; Lee | Take a Daytrip^{[a]}; Lee^{[b]}; Sliger^{[c]} | 2:25 |
| 10. | "Tales of Dominica" | Hill | Biral; Baptiste; Fedi; Lenzo | Take a Daytrip^{[a]}; Fedi; Sliger^{[c]}^{[d]}; Lenzo^{[c]}; Harrell^{[d]} | 2:26 |
| 11. | "Sun Goes Down" | Hill | Andrew Luce; Biral; Baptiste; Slatkin; Bach; Michael Olmo; Fedi; Lenzo | Take a Daytrip^{[a]}; Fedi; Lenzo; Sliger^{[c]}; Popnick^{[c]}; Harrell^{[d]} | 2:48 |
| 12. | "Void" | Hill | Cunningham; Carter Lang | Cunningham^{[a]}; Lang; Sliger^{[c]}; Harrell^{[d]} | 4:08 |
| 13. | "Dont Want It" | Hill | Biral; Baptiste; Dorien Theus; Dylan Wiggins; Jade Wiggins; Martin Rodrigues; Nicholas Mira | Take a Daytrip^{[a]}; Nick Mira; DTS; Hello Yellow^{[c]}; Fedi^{[c]} | 2:12 |
| 14. | "Life After Salem" | Hill | Cunningham; Sheff; Lang | Cunningham; Sheff; Lang; Sliger^{[c]}; Take a Daytrip^{[d]} | 3:31 |
| 15. | "Am I Dreaming" (featuring Miley Cyrus) | Hill; Cyrus | Biral; Baptiste; Fedi; Vincent Goodyer; William K. Ward | Take a Daytrip^{[a]}; Fedi; 18YOMAN^{[c]}; Sliger^{[c]}; Ward^{[c]}; Fedi^{[d]}; Harrell^{[d]} | 3:03 |
| Total length: | | | | | 41:17 |

Notes

- ^{^[a]} denotes a producer who also produced the vocals
- ^{^[b]} denoted additional producer
- ^{^[c]} miscellaneous producer
- ^{^[d]} vocal producer only
- The chorus of "Dont Want It" contains a portion of the flow and lyrics from "Mockingbird" written by Eminem.

== Credits ==
=== Musicians ===
- Montero Hill – lead vocals (all tracks), background vocals (1–3, 6, 8–11, 15), whistles (14)
- Denzel Baptiste – bass, keyboards, programming (1–3, 6, 9–11, 13, 15); vocals (1–3, 6 9–11, 15), guitar (2), background vocals (3, 13)
- David Biral – bass, keyboards, programming, (1–3, 6, 9–11, 13, 15); vocals (1–3, 6 9–11, 15), background vocals (13)
- Omer Fedi – guitar (1, 4, 10, 11, 13, 15), vocals (1, 10, 11, 15), bass (4, 15); background vocals, drums, keyboards (4)
- Roy Lenzo – programming (1, 6, 10), vocals (1, 6, 10, 11)
- Kanye West – production, horns (3)
- James Connor – background vocals (2)
- Quishima S. Dixon – background vocals (2)
- Cassandra R. Chism – background vocals (2)
- Jason McGee and The Choir – choir (2)
- Thomas James Levesque – horn, keyboards (2)
- Jasper Harris – keyboards, strings (2)
- Noel Goring – organ (2)
- Jack Harlow – lead vocals, background vocals (3)
- Nick Lee – horn (3, 9)
- Raul Cubina – programming (3)
- Ryan Svendsen – trumpet (3)
- Maclean Porter – vocals (3, 6, 9)
- KBeazy – background vocals, keyboards, programming (4)
- Blake Slatkin – background vocals, keyboards, programming (4)
- Ryan Tedder – background vocals, keyboards, programming (4)
- Doja Cat – featured vocals, background vocals (6)
- John Cunningham – bass, drums (7, 8, 12); guitar (7, 8, 12, 14), keyboards (8); piano, strings (12)
- Jack Ward – cello (7, 8, 14, 15)
- Ben Ward – double bass (7, 8, 10, 14)
- Jasper Sheff – drum machine, piano (7); guitar (14)
- Elton John – piano (7)
- William K. Ward – strings (7, 8, 10–12, 14, 15)
- 18yoman – strings (7, 8, 10–12, 14, 15)
- Glenn Hopper – strings (7, 12, 14)
- Megan Thee Stallion – featured vocals, background vocals (9)
- Natalie Mavridis – violin (10)
- Lydia Sawires – violin (10)
- Harry Ward – violin (10, 11)
- Freya Schack-Arnott – cello (11)
- Nick Seeley – drums (11)
- Carter Lang – bass, drums, guitar, keyboards (12, 14)
- Drew Sliger – background vocals (13)
- Jacques Morel – background vocals (13)
- Hannah Storm – background vocals (13)
- Mervin Hernandez – background vocals (13)
- Delisa Shannon – background vocals (13)
- Nick Mira – bass, keyboards, programming (13)
- Jaden Wiggins – bass (13)
- Martin Rodrigues – drums (13)
- Dylan Wiggins – guitar (13)
- Hello Yello – keyboards (13)
- DT – keyboards (13)
- Miley Cyrus – featured vocals, background vocals (15)
- Ben Adler – violin (15)

=== Technical ===
- Chris Gehringer – mastering engineer (1, 2, 5–10, 12–15)
- Eric Lagg – mastering engineer (3, 11)
- Randy Merrill – mastering engineer (4)
- Serban Ghenea – mixing engineer (1, 4, 7, 11)
- Patrizio "Teezio" Pigliapoco – mixing engineer (2, 3)
- Nickie Jon Pabón – mixing engineer (3), recording engineer (3)
- Denzel Baptiste – mixing engineer (5), recording engineer (1–3, 5–7, 9, 11, 13, 15)
- David Biral – mixing engineer (5), recording engineer (6), assistant engineer (2, 3, 5–15)
- Manny Marroquin – mixing engineer (6, 9, 10, 13)
- Jon Castelli – mixing engineer (8)
- Joe Visciano – mixing engineer (12, 14)
- Roy Lenzo – recording engineer (1, 3, 6, 7, 11, 15)
- Drew Sliger – recording engineer (2, 5, 8, 9, 12, 14), assistant engineer (1–3, 5, 7–15)
- Blake Slatkin – recording engineer (4)
- Ryan Tedder – recording engineer (4)
- John Cunningham – recording engineer (7, 8, 12, 14)
- Kuk Harrell – recording engineer (7, 11, 12, 15), vocal engineer (11)
- Jelli Dorman – recording engineer (7, 10, 11, 12, 15)
- Josh Deguzman – engineer (8)
- John Hanes – engineer (11)
- Mervin Hernandez – assistant engineer (1–3, 5–12, 14, 15)
- David Dickenson – assistant engineer (1–3, 5–12, 14, 15)
- Ashley Jackson – assistant engineer (2, 3)

=== Art and photography ===
- Pilar Zeta – design and art direction
- Charlotte Rutherford – photography

== Charts ==
=== Weekly charts ===
Weekly chart performance for Montero
| Chart (2021) | Peak position |
|---|---|
| Australian Albums (ARIA) | 1 |
| Austrian Albums (Ö3 Austria) | 2 |
| Belgian Albums (Ultratop Flanders) | 3 |
| Belgian Albums (Ultratop Wallonia) | 6 |
| Canadian Albums (Billboard) | 2 |
| Czech Albums (ČNS IFPI) | 3 |
| Danish Albums (Hitlisten) | 1 |
| Dutch Albums (Album Top 100) | 3 |
| Finnish Albums (Suomen virallinen lista) | 2 |
| French Albums (SNEP) | 6 |
| German Albums (Offizielle Top 100) | 13 |
| Icelandic Albums (Tónlistinn) | 2 |
| Irish Albums (Official Charts) | 1 |
| Italian Albums (FIMI) | 9 |
| Lithuanian Albums (AGATA) | 1 |
| New Zealand Albums (RMNZ) | 1 |
| Norwegian Albums (VG-lista) | 1 |
| Slovak Albums (ČNS IFPI) | 2 |
| Spanish Albums (Promusicae) | 2 |
| Swedish Albums (Sverigetopplistan) | 1 |
| Swiss Albums (Schweizer Hitparade) | 6 |
| UK Albums (Official Charts) | 2 |
| US Billboard 200 | 2 |

| Chart (2024) | Peak position |
|---|---|
| Portuguese Albums (AFP) | 163 |

=== Year-end charts ===
2021 year-end chart performance for Montero
| Chart (2021) | Position |
|---|---|
| Australian Albums (ARIA) | 72 |
| Belgian Albums (Ultratop Flanders) | 129 |
| Belgian Albums (Ultratop Wallonia) | 153 |
| Danish Albums (Hitlisten) | 59 |
| Dutch Albums (Album Top 100) | 53 |
| French Albums (SNEP) | 122 |
| Icelandic Albums (Tónlistinn) | 74 |
| New Zealand Albums (RMNZ) | 44 |
| Norwegian Albums (VG-lista) | 21 |
| Swedish Albums (Sverigetopplistan) | 69 |
| US Billboard 200 | 126 |

2022 year-end chart performance for Montero
| Chart (2022) | Position |
|---|---|
| Australian Albums (ARIA) | 73 |
| Belgian Albums (Ultratop Flanders) | 161 |
| Belgian Albums (Ultratop Wallonia) | 159 |
| Canadian Albums (Billboard) | 16 |
| Danish Albums (Hitlisten) | 53 |
| Dutch Albums (Album Top 100) | 80 |
| French Albums (SNEP) | 84 |
| Icelandic Albums (Tónlistinn) | 65 |
| Lithuanian Albums (AGATA) | 21 |
| New Zealand Albums (RMNZ) | 44 |
| Swedish Albums (Sverigetopplistan) | 70 |
| US Billboard 200 | 44 |

2023 year-end chart performance for Montero
| Chart (2023) | Position |
|---|---|
| French Albums (SNEP) | 183 |

== Certifications and sales ==
| Region | Certification | Certified units/sales |
|---|---|---|
| Australia (ARIA) | Gold | 35,000^{‡} |
| Belgium (BRMA) | 2× Platinum | 40,000^{‡} |
| Brazil (Pro-Música Brasil) | Diamond | 160,000^{‡} |
| Canada (Music Canada) | 2× Platinum | 160,000^{‡} |
| Denmark (IFPI Danmark) | Platinum | 20,000^{‡} |
| France (SNEP) | Platinum | 100,000^{‡} |
| Iceland (FHF) | — | 1,089 |
| Italy (FIMI) | Platinum | 50,000^{‡} |
| New Zealand (RMNZ) | Platinum | 15,000^{‡} |
| Norway (IFPI Norway) | Platinum | 20,000^{‡} |
| Poland (ZPAV) | 2× Platinum | 40,000^{‡} |
| Portugal (AFP) | Gold | 3,500^{‡} |
| Singapore (RIAS) | Gold | 5,000^{*} |
| Sweden (GLF) | Platinum | 30,000^{‡} |
| Switzerland (IFPI Switzerland) | Platinum | 20,000^{‡} |
| United Kingdom (BPI) | Gold | 100,000^{‡} |
| United States (RIAA) | 2× Platinum | 2,000,000^{‡} |
^{*} Sales figures based on certification alone.^{‡} Sales+streaming figures based on certification alone.

== Release history ==
Release dates and formats for Montero
| Region | Date | Format(s) | Label |
|---|---|---|---|
| Various | September 17, 2021 | Digital download; streaming | Columbia |
