= Industry Baby =

2021 single by Lil Nas X

Single by Lil Nas X featuring Jack Harlow

from the album Montero
- Released: July 23, 2021
- Genre: Trap; pop rap
- Length: 3:32
- Label: Columbia
- Songwriters: Montero Hill; Jackman Harlow; Mark Williams; Raul Cubina; Roy Lenzo; Denzel Baptiste; David Biral; Kanye West; Nick Lee
- Producers: Take a Daytrip; Kanye West

Lil Nas X singles chronology
"Sun Goes Down" (2021)	"Industry Baby" (2021)	"Thats What I Want" (2021)

Jack Harlow singles chronology
"I Won" (2021)	"Industry Baby" (2021)	"SUVs (Black on Black)" (2021)

Music video
- "Industry Baby" on YouTube

"Industry Baby" (stylized in all caps) is a song by the American rapper Lil Nas X featuring Jack Harlow, released on July 23, 2021, through Columbia Records. The song features co-production by Kanye West and the duo Take a Daytrip. It is the third single from Lil Nas X's debut album, Montero (2021), following up the international success of lead single "Montero (Call Me by Your Name)". The song debuted at number 2 on the Billboard Hot 100 for the week of August 7, 2021, and became Lil Nas X's third and Harlow's first number-one single on the chart on the week of October 23, 2021 after a massive gain in digital sales. On October 9, 2021, an extended version was released that features a short verse from Lil Nas X during the outro. The song was nominated for Best Melodic Rap Performance at the 64th Annual Grammy Awards.

== Background and release ==
In March 2021, Nike, Inc. filed a lawsuit against the art collective MSCHF, who designed the Satan Shoes as promotion for Lil Nas X's song, "Montero (Call Me by Your Name)". The case was settled in April, though on July 16, Lil Nas X posted a video on TikTok claiming that he had an upcoming court hearing regarding it on July 19. The date of this supposed court hearing, however, turned out to be the release date of the teaser for "Industry Baby" in the form of a skit parodying the lawsuit, with him ostensibly appearing on trial for the Satan Shoes, but quickly shifting focus towards his sexuality. The teaser was accompanied by a website.

In late June, a demo version of the song with slightly different instrumentals was leaked online. The demo version included no features.

Ahead of the song's release, Lil Nas X shared a letter addressed to his 20-year-old self noting that the song is one "for us". Among other things, he writes of his stagnation during the COVID-19 pandemic, ostracization due to his sexuality, and staying strong in the face of adversity to witness his future success.

Regarding the involvement of Kanye West, David Biral of Take a Daytrip told Rolling Stone in September 2021:

[Me] and Denzel [Baptiste] didn't get to meet Kanye, but Nas had the opportunity to sit down with him and play him a bunch of records from the album, maybe two months ago now...Kanye specifically picked out 'Industry Baby' and just from what Nas told us, Kanye gravitated to that one just because it reminded him of some of his anthemic moments, like 'All of the Lights.' He just wanted to come in and really give it an overall finishing touch. So he came in and helped layer some instruments and really helped beef up the production.

West's frequent collaborators, production duo Ojivolta, are also given songwriting credits on the song.

Alongside the release of the song and music video on July 23, 2021, Lil Nas X also partnered with the non-profit organization The Bail Project through the Bail X Fund, raising money with the goal of ending cash bail in the United States in mind.

== Composition ==
Production duo Take a Daytrip produced "Industry Baby"'s initial instrumental. Lil Nas X met with Kanye West and played a number of tracks for him. West was drawn to "Industry Baby" and, alongside production duo Ojivolta, layered additional sounds onto the track. In the song, Lil Nas X sings and raps, bragging about his accomplishments and commercial success. He interpolates the Waka Flocka Flame song "O Let's Do It" in a verse. Jack Harlow delivers a "long and technically complex" feature verse, in one line interpolating the Rowdy Rebel's and Bobby Shmurda song "Computers".

Clash described the song "as a bubbling piece of pop-edged rap". Billboard described the song as an "expertly crafted rap anthem". It was originally planned to feature a guest appearance from Nicki Minaj; however, Lil Nas X did not receive a response from her.

== Accolades ==
Awards and nominations for "Industry Baby"
Year	Organization	Award	Result	Ref(s)
2021	MTV Video Music Award	Song of Summer	Nominated	
2021	UK Music Video Award	Best Pop Video – International	Won	
2021	UK Music Video Award	Best Choreography in a Video	Nominated	
2021	MTV Europe Music Award	Best Collaboration	Nominated	
2022	Grammy Award	Best Melodic Rap Performance	Nominated	
2022	MTV Video Music Award	Video of the Year	Nominated	
2022	MTV Video Music Award	Best Collaboration	Won	
2022	MTV Video Music Award	Best Direction	Nominated	
2022	MTV Video Music Award	Best Art Direction	Won	
2022	MTV Video Music Award	Best Choreography	Nominated	
2022	MTV Video Music Award	Best Visual Effects	Won	
2022	American Music Award	Collaboration of the Year	Nominated	
2022	American Music Award	Favorite Music Video	Nominated	
2022	American Music Award	Favorite Hip-Hop Song	Nominated	
2023	iHeartRadio Music Awards	Song of the Year	Nominated	
2023	iHeartRadio Music Awards	Best Collaboration	Nominated	

== Music videos ==
=== "Industry Baby (Prelude)" ===
The trailer video for "Industry Baby" was released on July 19, 2021, on YouTube. The skit features Lil Nas X playing multiple characters and parodies the Satan Shoes Court case, in which he was sued by Nike. At the end of the teaser, a judge sentences Lil Nas X to "five years in Montero State Prison."

=== "Industry Baby" ===
The music video for the song "Industry Baby" was uploaded on July 23, 2021, on Lil Nas X's YouTube channel through Vevo, and as of February 1, 2025, it had more than 491 million views. It was directed by Christian Breslauer and produced by Andrew Lerios, based on a story by Lil Nas X. Other credits include Luis Caraza as the video editor and Bryson Pintard as the art director. Luga Podesta and Brandon Bonfiglio executive produced. The video starred Lil Nas X, Jack Harlow, Colton Haynes as head of security and Vanessa Buchholz as a prison guard. Jason Momoa lookalike Phil Brandt is also visible in the prison yard. The dancing was choreographed by Sean Bankhead. According to the video credits, it also incorporated 20 dancers, 9 "prison guards" and 29 "prisoners".

The video starts with Lil Nas X being incarcerated in the Montero State Prison, 3 months after being sentenced in the prelude video. He is seen polishing his musical awards, walking around the prison and lifting weights in the courtyard, surrounded by the other inmates wearing bright pink uniforms. Jack Harlow brings a "Book of Montero" to Lil Nas X which contains a hammer, and the singer uses it to dig a tunnel in his cell wall. He manages to knock out a security guard, who is distracted by the "Montero (Call Me by Your Name)" music video playing on his phone, and pushes a button to open all the prison cells. The video switches to Harlow, who walks calmly through the prison as all the inmates escape. The video ends with the inmates leaving the prison aboard a prison bus, driven by Harlow and with Lil Nas X sitting on its roof, the prison in flames behind them.

The video pays homage to the 1994 film The Shawshank Redemption and the 1979 film Escape from Alcatraz.

=== "Industry Baby (Uncensored Video)" ===
Five days later, on July 28, 2021, Lil Nas X trolled fans by releasing the "uncensored" version of his "Industry Baby" music video. The title refers to the censoring of the naked shower dancing scene from the original. This version starts the same as the original, but when the shower head is shown just before the dance starts, the video appears to buffer, showing a spinning circle. The video stays this way for the remaining duration of the music video, never actually showing the rest of the video or uncensoring the censored scene.

== Usage in media ==
The song is featured in a 2023 episode of Beavis and Butt-Head. It's also featured in the 2021 game Forza Horizon 5, on the in-game hip-hop radio station "Horizon Block Party".

== Track listings ==
- Digital download and streaming
1. "Industry Baby" – 3:32
- Digital download and streaming – Industry Baby 2.0
1. "Industry Baby" – 3:32
2. "Industry Baby" (Extended) – 3:47

== Credits and personnel ==
Credits adapted from the digital liner notes.

Musicians

- Lil Nas X – vocals, songwriter
- Jack Harlow – vocals, songwriter
- Take a Daytrip — producer
- Kanye West – producer, songwriter
- David Biral – programming, keyboards, bass, songwriter, vocal producer
- Denzel Batiste – keyboards, programming, bass, background vocals, songwriter, vocal producer
- Nick Lee – trombone, songwriter
- Raul Cubina – programming, songwriter, co-producer
- Ryan Svendsen – trumpet
- Maclean Porter – background vocals
- Roy Lenzo – songwriter
- Mark Williams – songwriter
- Drew Sliger – additional producer
- Ojivolta – additional producer

Technicals

- Denzel Batiste – recording engineer
- David Biral – assistant engineer
- Roy Lenzo – recording engineer
- Drew Sliger – assistant engineer
- Nicki Jon Pabón – mixing engineer, recording engineer
- David Dickenson – assistant engineer
- Marvin Hernandez – assistant engineer
- Patrizio "Teezio" Pigliapoco – mixing engineer
- Eric Lagg – mastering engineer
- Ashley Jackson – assistant engineer

Art and photography

- Blunt Action – cover art

== Charts ==
=== Weekly charts ===
Chart performance for "Industry Baby"
Chart (2021–2022)	Peak position
Argentina Hot 100 (Billboard)	64
Australia (ARIA)	4
Austria (Ö3 Austria Top 40)	7
Belgium (Ultratop 50 Flanders)	19
Belgium (Ultratop 50 Wallonia)	9
Brazil (UBC)	6
Canada Hot 100 (Billboard)	3
Canada AC (Billboard)	48
Canada CHR/Top 40 (Billboard)	1
Canada Hot AC (Billboard)	40
CIS Airplay (TopHit)	22
Costa Rica (FONOTICA)	12
Croatia (HRT)	23
Czech Republic Singles Digital (ČNS IFPI)	3
Denmark (Tracklisten)	4
Dominican Republic (SODINPRO)	40
Finland (Suomen virallinen lista)	5
France (SNEP)	3
Germany (GfK)	9
Global 200 (Billboard)	2
Greece International (IFPI)	1
Hungary (Single Top 40)	11
Hungary (Stream Top 40)	2
Iceland (Tónlistinn)	5
India International Singles (IMI)	3
Ireland (IRMA)	2
Israel (Media Forest)	7
Italy (FIMI)	20
Lebanon (OLT20)	4
Lithuania (AGATA)	2
Luxembourg (Billboard)	12
Malaysia (RIM)	7
Mexico Ingles Airplay (Billboard)	17
Netherlands (Dutch Top 40)	27
Netherlands (Single Top 100)	10
New Zealand (Recorded Music NZ)	1
Norway (VG-lista)	3
Panama (PRODUCE)	15
Paraguay (SGP)	100
Peru (UNIMPRO)	34
Portugal (AFP)	1
Romania (Radiomonitor)	19
Russia Airplay (TopHit)	20
Singapore (RIAS)	3
Slovakia Airplay (ČNS IFPI)	19
Slovakia Singles Digital (ČNS IFPI)	2
South Africa (TOSAC)	16
South Korea (Gaon)	182
Spain (Promusicae)	27
Sweden (Sverigetopplistan)	8
Switzerland (Schweizer Hitparade)	4
UK Singles (Official Charts)	3
UK Hip Hop/R&B (Official Charts)	1
US Billboard Hot 100	1
US Adult Pop Airplay (Billboard)	26
US Dance Airplay (Billboard)	5
US Hot R&B/Hip-Hop Songs (Billboard)	1
US R&B/Hip-Hop Airplay (Billboard)	16
US Pop Airplay (Billboard)	1
US Rhythmic Airplay (Billboard)	1
US Rolling Stone Top 100	1
Vietnam (Vietnam Hot 100)	41

=== Year-end charts ===
2021 year-end chart performance for "Industry Baby"
Chart (2021)	Position
Australia (ARIA)	23
Austria (Ö3 Austria Top 40)	26
Belgium (Ultratop Flanders)	91
Belgium (Ultratop Wallonia)	39
Brazil Streaming (Pro-Música Brasil)	65
Canada (Canadian Hot 100)	21
CIS (TopHit)	147
Denmark (Tracklisten)	37
France (SNEP)	26
Germany (Official German Charts)	43
Global 200 (Billboard)	26
Hungary (Single Top 40)	69
Hungary (Stream Top 40)	14
Iceland (Tónlistinn)	29
India International Singles (IMI)	16
Ireland (IRMA)	31
Italy (FIMI)	76
Netherlands (Single Top 100)	50
New Zealand (Recorded Music NZ)	22
Norway (VG-lista)	25
Portugal (AFP)	6
Russia Airplay (TopHit)	129
Sweden (Sverigetopplistan)	68
Switzerland (Schweizer Hitparade)	31
UK Singles (OCC)	45
US Billboard Hot 100	24
US Hot R&B/Hip-Hop Songs (Billboard)	6
US Mainstream Top 40 (Billboard)	28
US Rhythmic (Billboard)	20

2022 year-end chart performance for "Industry Baby"
Chart (2022)	Position
Australia (ARIA)	16
Austria (Ö3 Austria Top 40)	47
Belgium (Ultratop 50 Flanders)	131
Belgium (Ultratop 50 Wallonia)	91
Brazil (Pro-Música Brasil)	91
Canada (Canadian Hot 100)	15
Denmark (Tracklisten)	61
Germany (Official German Charts)	62
Global 200 (Billboard)	12
Hungary (Stream Top 40)	49
Lithuania (AGATA)	29
New Zealand (Recorded Music NZ)	17
Russia Airplay (TopHit)	196
Switzerland (Schweizer Hitparade)	47
UK Singles (OCC)	100
US Billboard Hot 100	16
US Hot R&B/Hip-Hop Songs (Billboard)	6
US Mainstream Top 40 (Billboard)	15
US Rhythmic (Billboard)	27
Vietnam (Vietnam Hot 100)	100

== Certifications ==
Certifications for "Industry Baby"
Region	Certification	Certified units/sales
Australia (ARIA)	7× Platinum	490,000^{‡}
Belgium (BRMA)	Platinum	40,000^{‡}
Brazil (Pro-Música Brasil)	3× Diamond	480,000^{‡}
Canada (Music Canada)	7× Platinum	560,000^{‡}
Denmark (IFPI Danmark)	Platinum	90,000^{‡}
France (SNEP)	Diamond	333,333^{‡}
Germany (BVMI)	Platinum	600,000^{‡}
Italy (FIMI)	2× Platinum	200,000^{‡}
Mexico (AMPROFON)	2× Platinum+Gold	350,000^{‡}
New Zealand (RMNZ)	5× Platinum	150,000^{‡}
Norway (IFPI Norway)	Platinum	60,000^{‡}
Poland (ZPAV)	3× Platinum	150,000^{‡}
Portugal (AFP)	4× Platinum	40,000^{‡}
Spain (Promusicae)	2× Platinum	120,000^{‡}
Switzerland (IFPI Switzerland)	2× Platinum	40,000^{‡}
United Kingdom (BPI)	2× Platinum	1,200,000^{‡}
United States (RIAA)	7× Platinum	7,000,000^{‡}
Streaming
Greece (IFPI Greece)	2× Platinum	4,000,000^{†}
Japan (RIAJ)	Gold	50,000,000^{†}
Sweden (GLF)	Platinum	8,000,000^{†}
^{‡} Sales+streaming figures based on certification alone.^{†} Streaming-only figures based on certification alone.

== Release history ==
Release dates and formats for "Industry Baby"
Region	Date	Format(s)	Version	Label	Ref.
Various	July 23, 2021	Digital download; streaming	Original	Columbia	
United States	August 3, 2021	Contemporary hit radio	Original	Columbia	
United States	August 3, 2021	Rhythmic contemporary radio	Original	Columbia	
United States	August 3, 2021	Urban contemporary radio	Original	Columbia	
Various	October 9, 2021	Digital download; streaming	"2.0"	Columbia	

== See also ==
- List of Billboard Hot 100 number ones of 2021
