= Sun Goes Down (Lil Nas X song) =

2021 single by Lil Nas X

Single by Lil Nas X

from the album Montero
- Released: May 21, 2021
- Recorded: June 19, 2020
- Length: 2:48
- Label: Columbia
- Songwriters: Montero Hill; Denzel Baptiste; David Biral; Omer Fedi; Roy Lenzo; Michael Olmo; Keegan Bach; Blake Slatkin; Andrew Luce
- Producers: Take a Daytrip; Omer Fedi; Roy Lenzo

Lil Nas X singles chronology
"Montero (Call Me by Your Name)" (2021)	"Sun Goes Down" (2021)	"Industry Baby" (2021)

Music video
- "Sun Goes Down" on YouTube

"Sun Goes Down" (stylized in all caps) is a song by American singer and rapper Lil Nas X. It was released as a single through Columbia on May 21, 2021, as the second single from his first studio album Montero.

In the song, Lil Nas X addresses his younger closeted self, reflecting on his struggles with bullying and coming to terms with his homosexuality growing up. In contrast to his past music videos carrying surrealistic and futuristic elements, this one is more grounded in reality to reflect the more contemplative nature of the song.

== Background and release ==
On May 3, 2021, Lil Nas X announced that he would perform "Montero (Call Me by Your Name)" and a new song on Saturday Night Live on May 22. On May 13, he revealed the song title, release date and cover art of the song on his social media. The cover depicts him sitting in the sky in a suit controlling water with his fingers, drawing comparisons to Avatar: The Last Airbender. He wrote on Twitter on May 16 that the music video will depict him going back in time to uplift his younger closeted self, and that it is "really special" to him. He elaborates that it is his most "vulnerable" song, noting the song's exploration of his troubled upbringing.

Prior to the song's release, Lil Nas X posted the following message for his younger self on Twitter on February 2, 2021, "Dear 14 year old Montero, I wrote a song with our name in it. It's about a guy I met last summer. I know we promised to never come out publicly, I know we promised never to be 'that' type of gay person, I know we promised to die with the secret, but this will open doors for many other queer people to simply exist. You see this is very scary for me, people will be angry, they will say I'm pushing an agenda. But the truth is, I am. The agenda to make people stay the fuck out of other people's lives and stop dictating who they should be. Sending you love from the future."

The song was released on May 21, 2021, with a music video premiering on YouTube alongside it. Shortly after the song's release, he commented on people's negative reaction to a line about Nicki Minaj. He notes that the song was about his life, of which 6 years were "dedicated" to her, addressing his past as a former Barb, a term for someone who is part of the fandom surrounding Minaj.

== Composition ==
"Sun Goes Down" follows in the footsteps of his previous single "Montero (Call Me by Your Name)", containing prominent homosexual themes. Throughout the song, Lil Nas X describes his feeling of not fitting in with his peers while growing up, noting that the Nicki Minaj fandom community on social media was the only place where he felt he belonged. He further depicts his struggles with bullying and coming to terms with his sexuality, and in the song's chorus, he sings about contemplating suicide.

== Music video ==
The video starts with Lil Nas X depicted meditating above a lake of water with a galactic backdrop dressed in white, manipulating water with his hands. The video continues with him skimming through memories, including music videos for previous songs. He then enters a memory of himself in high school, first at his work at Taco Bell, and later being depicted praying in his bedroom to God to take away his gay thoughts. The video later cuts to a prom dance, where his teenage self struggles to fit in, before leaving to hide in the bathroom to cry. After composing himself in front of the mirror, his older self appears behind him, lending him a supporting hand, leading him back to the prom, where he is now far more comfortable, being depicted dancing with his friends.

Like past music videos of Lil Nas X, this video uses elements of surrealism and futurism, but tones it down to keep it grounded in reality, as he wanted it to feel "very real". The concept for the video was largely the brainchild of Lil Nas X himself, though the visuals were co-directed by the L.A.-based Psycho Films.

== Track listing ==
Digital download / streaming

1. "Sun Goes Down" – 2:48

== Credits and personnel ==
Credits adapted from Tidal.

- Lil Nas X – vocals, songwriting
- Omer Fedi – songwriting, production
- Roy Lenzo – songwriting, production
- Take a Daytrip – production
  - David Biral – songwriting
  - Denzel Baptiste – songwriting
- Popnick – miscellaneous producer
- Nick Seeley – drums
- Michael Olmo – songwriting
- Keegan Bach – songwriting
- Blake Slatkin – songwriting
- Andrew Luce – songwriting
- John Hanes – engineering
- Drew Sliger – engineering assistant
- Jelli Dorman – engineering assistant
- Kuk Harrell – recording engineering
- Serban Ghenea – mixing
- Chris Gehringer – mastering

== Charts ==
Chart performance for "Sun Goes Down"
Chart (2021)	Peak position
Australia (ARIA)	74
Belgium Urban (Ultratop)	30
Canada Hot 100 (Billboard)	41
France (SNEP)	150
Global 200 (Billboard)	47
Ireland (IRMA)	35
Lithuania (AGATA)	91
New Zealand Hot Singles (RMNZ)	6
Portugal (AFP)	69
Sweden (Sverigetopplistan)	88
Switzerland (Schweizer Hitparade)	85
UK Singles (Official Charts)	42
US Billboard Hot 100	66

== Certifications ==
Certifications for "Sun Goes Down"
Region	Certification	Certified units/sales
Brazil (Pro-Música Brasil)	Platinum	40,000^{‡}
Canada (Music Canada)	Gold	40,000^{‡}
United States (RIAA)	Gold	500,000^{‡}
^{‡} Sales+streaming figures based on certification alone.

== Release history ==
Release dates and formats for "Sun Goes Down"
Region	Date	Format(s)	Label	Ref.
Various	May 21, 2021	Digital download; streaming	Columbia	
