= Wang Contemporary =

Arts space in New York City

Coordinates: 40.7161°N 73.9965°W

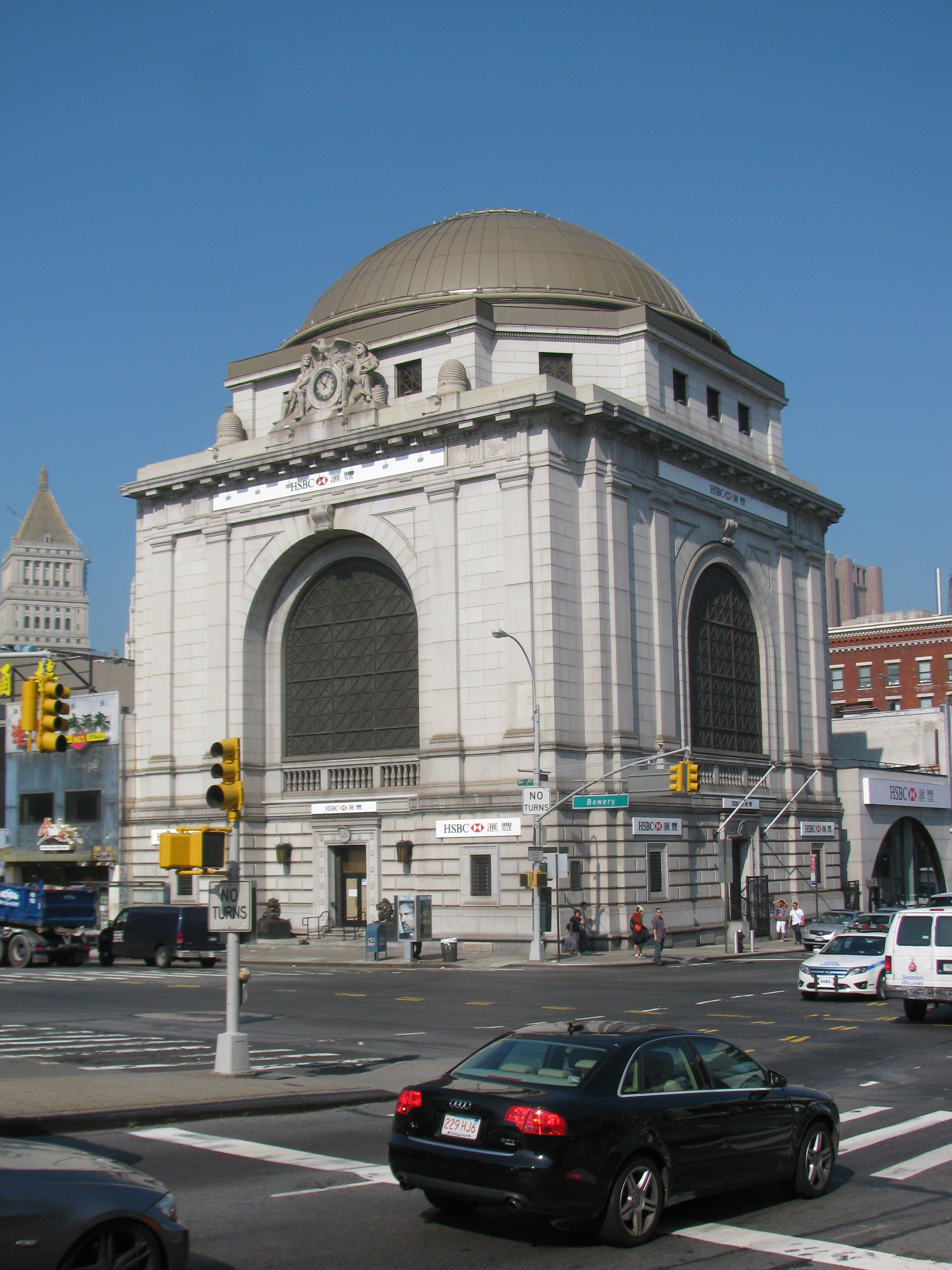
58 Bowery in 2012

The Wang Contemporary is an arts space located at 58 Bowery in Chinatown, New York City that was established by designer Alexander Wang and his mother Ying Wang to celebrate and showcase Asian and Asian-American creativity.

The space opened in February 2026 with an exhibition by the art collective MSCHF centered around Lunar New Year.

== History ==
Alexander Wang and Ying Wang purchased the 58 Bowery, a landmarked Beaux-Arts building that housed the former Citizen Banks, around August 2025. The pair had been eyeing the space for around seven years before the purchase, but the dream of an arts and creativity space dates back earlier.
