= Deep Instinct =

American cybersecurity company

Deep Instinct Inc
- Type: Private
- Industry: Cybersecurity
- Founded: 2015
- Founder: Guy Caspi; Dr. Eli David; Nadav Maman
- Headquarters: New York City, United States
- Area served: North America, APAC, EMEA, Japan
- Key people: Guy Caspi (CEO); Dr. Eli David; Nadav Maman
- Website: www.deepinstinct.com

Deep Instinct is a cybersecurity company that applies deep learning to cybersecurity. The company implements artificial intelligence to the task of preventing and detecting malware. The company was the recipient of the Technology Pioneer by The World Economic Forum in 2017.

Lane Bess has been CEO of the company since 2022.

== Overview ==
In 2015, Deep Instinct was founded by Guy Caspi, Dr. Eli David, and Nadav Maman. The headquarters of the company is located in New York City.

In July 2017, NVIDIA became an investor. According to Tom's Hardware, NVIDIA’s investment enabled access to a GPU-based neural network and CUDA platform, which they were using to achieve maximum vulnerability detection rates. As of February 2020, the company had raised $43 million in Series C funding round.

In April 2021, Deep Instinct raised $100 million in Series D funding to accelerate growth.

== Partnerships ==
In April 2019, Deep Instinct partnered with Chinese artist, Guo O. Dong on an art project titled, The Persistence of Chaos, consisting of a laptop infected with 6 pieces of malware that represented $95 billion in damages. The art was auctioned with a final bid of $1,345,000. In the same year, Globes reported that, HP Inc partnered with Deep Instinct to launch their security solution HP SureSense, which has been applied to the EliteBook and Zbook devices.
