= Nike Air Tailwind =

Line of shoes by Nike

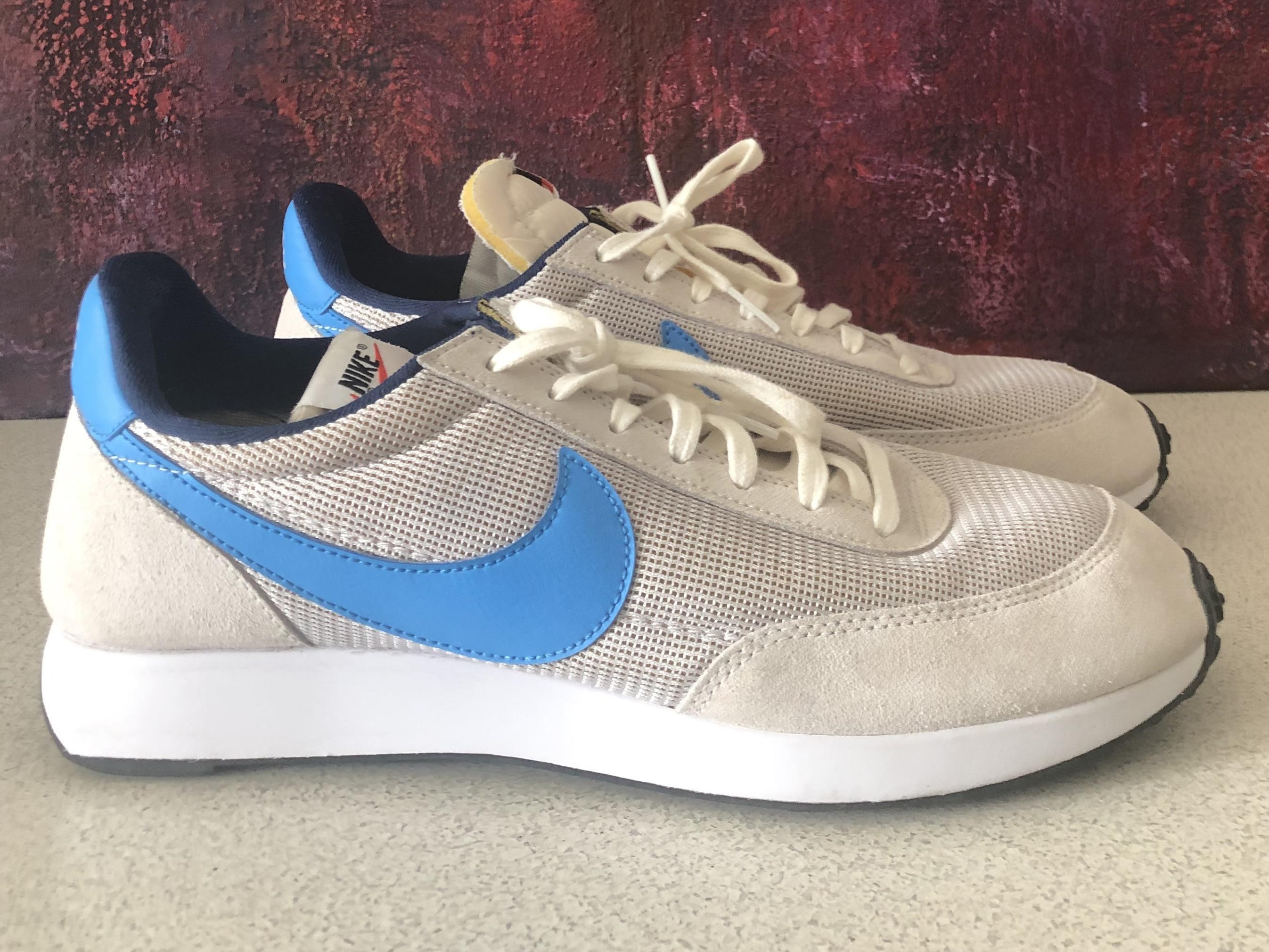
- A pair of the original Nike Air Tailwind shoes
- Type: Sneakers
- Inventor: Nike, Inc.
- Inception: 1978; 48 years ago
- Manufacturer: Nike
- Available: Yes

Nike Air Tailwind is a line of running shoes produced by Nike, Inc. The shoe is notable for being the first shoe to implement Nike's air technology in the sole. The technology would go on to become a pivotal part of the company's identity not only in the quality of its shoes but also in the design and style of its products.

== Overview ==
M. Frank Rudy, an aeronautical engineer, first brought the idea of an air-cushioned sole to Nike in 1977. Frank Rudy had visited 23 other shoe companies before approaching Nike with the idea. Many saw the implementation of air bags in the shoes as a gimmick including Phil Knight and Bill Bowerman. It wasn't until Phil Knight tested one of Frank Rudy's prototypes that he was convinced of the technology and decided to use it.

After a year of trial and error, Nike debuted the Nike Tailwind at the Honolulu Marathon in a limited release. It wouldn't see a worldwide released until the following year in 1979. The shoe would be renamed to Nike Air Tailwind with re-releases. In 1979, Frank Rudy patented a design using polyurethane sacs filled with pressurized inert gas that Nike would later use in various models in the years to follow.

== Models ==
=== Air Tailwind ===
The original model in the line. The first shoe was made with a main nylon upper with suede along the toe cap, back of the shoe, and along the lacing. The air unit runs from the back of the shoe to front, right before where the toes would be and sits on top of foam.

=== Air Tailwind 92 ===
A follow up to the original model would not be released until 1992. Instead of having the air bag hidden in the sole like the original, the second iteration followed the same design as the Nike Air Max and have a visible air unit. The shoe was released to coincide with the 1992 Summer Olympics.
