= Lost in the Citadel =

2022 single by Lil Nas X

Single by Lil Nas X

from the album Montero
- Released: April 8, 2022
- Genre: Pop rock; pop-punk
- Length: 2:50
- Label: Sony
- Songwriters: Montero Hill; John Cunningham
- Producer: Cunningham

Lil Nas X singles chronology
"Thats What I Want" (2021)	"Lost in the Citadel" (2022)	"Late to da Party (F*ck BET)" (2022)

Visualizer
- "Lost in the Citadel" on YouTube

"Lost in the Citadel" is a song by American rapper Lil Nas X. In limited release, it was sent to Italian contemporary hit radio through Sony Music on April 8, 2022, as the fifth and final single from his debut studio album, Montero (2021). The song was written by him and the track's producer John Cunningham.

== Composition and lyrics ==
"Lost in the Citadel" is an 1980s rock-inspired pop rock and pop-punk song that sees Lil Nas X reminiscing about a previous relationship that did not go so well that he cannot stop indulging in, which is in the middle of the complete pop songs and the guitar-heavy second half of the song. The song opens up with a synth melody that is identical to 2000s-inspired bedroom synth-pop, with Lil Nas X singing about his future lover on the "soaring chorus" before the song calms down. It has been described as "a troubled love song", with Lil Nas X belting out: "I need time to get up and get off the floor / I need time to realize that I can't be yours".

== Critical reception ==
Laviea Thomas of Clash deemed the "dystopian daydream" as "a trance-like break from the high energy run-ups", explaining that "it's the perfect break and further edges forward the otherworldly theme that is weaved throughout the entire album". Exclaim! music critic Jordan Currie felt that the song is "a unique standout on the tracklist" of Montero that showcases Lil Nas X's versatility. PJ Somervelle of The Line of Best Fit was reminded of Machine Gun Kelly and Willow from the muted chord riffs of "Lost in the Citadel" and was reminded of Travis Barker from the drums of the song.

== Charts ==
Chart performance for "Lost in the Citadel"
Chart (2021)	Peak position
Canada Hot 100 (Billboard)	76
Global 200 (Billboard)	87
US Billboard Hot 100	90

== Release history ==
Release history and formats for "Lost in the Citadel"
Region	Date	Format	Label	Ref.
Italy	April 8, 2022	Radio airplay	Sony Italy	
