= The Persistence of Chaos =

Virus-infected laptop as a work of art

- The Persistence of Chaos in 2019, with WannaCry visible onscreen
- Artist: Guo O Dong; MSCHF
- Year: 2019
- Dimensions: 10.3” (260 mm) × 1.2” (30 mm) × 7.3” (190 mm)
- Weight: 2.8 pounds (1.3 kg)
- Website: thepersistenceofchaos.com

The Persistence of Chaos is a work of art consisting of a laptop that contains six computer viruses, worms, and pieces of malware that have caused major damage. The artwork was created in 2019 by artist Guo O Dong and the collective MSCHF, and sold at auction for $1,345,000 in May 2019. Guo O Dong described it as a bestiary for historical malware, and expressed concern about the high price at which it sold, stating that he would either spend the money on another project or burn it.

== Background ==
We have this fantasy that things that happen in computers can't actually affect us, but this is absurd. Weaponized viruses that affect power grids or public infrastructure can cause direct harm.

— Guo O Dong, in The Verge

The Persistence of Chaos was created in 2019 by artist Guo O Dong and MSCHF after they were commissioned by Deep Instinct, a computer security company. It cost more than $10,000 to create, with much of the money spent on ensuring that the malware it contained was effectively firewalled so that it could not spread to other computers.

Guo O Dong originally intended to title the work Antivaxxer in reference to vaccine hesitancy, but changed the name as the intent of the artwork shifted during its creation. He told The Verge that the work was intended to be a physical manifestation of digital threats that might otherwise seem abstract, describing it as "a kind of bestiary — a catalogue of historical threats".

== Description ==
The technical basis for The Persistence of Chaos was a Samsung NC10, a netbook first released in 2008. The laptop computer equipped with Windows XP was deliberately infected with an assortment of viruses, worms, and malware which have caused $95 billion in financial damages: the ILOVEYOU virus, Mydoom worm, Sobig worm, WannaCry ransomware, DarkTequila malware, and BlackEnergy malware. The device was isolated and airgapped to prevent misuse of the malware it contained.

The artwork measures 10.3” (260 mm) × 1.2” (30 mm) × 7.3” (190 mm), and weighs 2.8 pounds (1.3 kg). In addition to the malware-loaded laptop, it includes the power cord for the device and a restart script.

== Auction ==
The Persistence of Chaos was sold in an online auction as a work of art. During the auction, a live stream showing the laptop was accessible through Twitch. A disclaimer on the auction webpage noted that selling malware for reuse "is illegal in the United States" and that bidders must "agree and acknowledge that you're purchasing this work as a piece of art or for academic reasons, and have no intention of disseminating any malware." It additionally stated that the computer's ports and capacity for internet connection would be disabled before shipping.

The auction closed on May 28, 2019, with a winning bid of $1,345,000 by an unknown buyer. The money went to Guo O Dong, who told Artnet News that he would either spend it on creating another artwork or burn it. He noted that the amount of public interest in The Persistence of Chaos was thought-provoking for him, stating that "this piece could be considered an exhibit of historical weaponry" and questioning why someone wanted to spend so much money on acquiring it.

== Reception ==
Infoblox executive Gary Cox told Verdict that The Persistence of Chaos was one of the things making him "rethink what constitutes art on a regular basis", comparing it to Banksy's Love Is in the Bin and noting that the laptop forming the basis of the work had a resale value of roughly $50. ESET security specialist Jake Moore said that the work "essentially contains modern-day history in the form of zeros and ones". Faye Mitchell, the deputy director of Coventry University's School of Computing, Electronics and Mathematics, expressed the concern that the artwork was a distortion and trivialization of cybersecurity and its purpose.
