= Thats What I Want =

2021 single by Lil Nas X

Single by Lil Nas X

from the album Montero
- Released: September 17, 2021
- Recorded: 2020
- Genre: Pop rock; electropop; power pop
- Length: 2:23
- Label: Columbia
- Songwriters: Montero Hill; Omer Fedi; Blake Slatkin; Ryan Tedder; Keegan Bach
- Producers: Omer Fedi; Blake Slatkin; Ryan Tedder; KBeaZy

Lil Nas X singles chronology
"Industry Baby" (2021)	"Thats What I Want" (2021)	"Lost in the Citadel" (2022)

Music video
- "Thats What I Want" on YouTube

"Thats What I Want" (stylized in all caps) is a song by the American rapper and singer Lil Nas X, released through Columbia Records on September 17, 2021, as the fourth single from his debut studio album, Montero (2021). It is a pop rock song with elements of power pop, in which he is singing about wanting love. It was written by Lil Nas X and the song's producers, Omer Fedi, Blake Slatkin, Ryan Tedder, and KBeaZy.

It received favorable reviews, with critics comparing it to Outkast's work, especially to their 2003 single "Hey Ya!". The song's release was accompanied by a Stillz-directed music video featuring the rapper falling in love with a football player. It contains a cameo from Billy Porter and an homage to the 2005 film Brokeback Mountain. Lil Nas X performed this song for the first time on BBC Radio 1's Live Lounge. It became a top ten hit in many countries, including the United States and the United Kingdom.

== Composition ==
"Thats What I Want" was written by Lil Nas X, and the song's producers: Omer Fedi, Blake Slatkin, Ryan Tedder, and KBeaZy. It is a pop rock song backed-up by acoustic guitar, "breezy" rhythm, "acoustic strums and hand claps and raindrop-bloopy synth notes." The song was compared by the critics to Outkast's "Hey Ya!" (2003), Taylor Swift's "Shake It Off" (2014) and the Kid Laroi and Justin Bieber's "Stay" (2021). The track begins with the rapper stating "Need a boy who can cuddle with me all night." The song's chorus is accompanied by "power pop" background choir and it sees Lil Nas X singing that he wants to have a lover. Sheet music for the song gives the key of C-sharp minor with a tempo of 88 beats per minute. Vocals range from the note of B_{3} and A_{5}.

== Release and promotion ==
Lil Nas X first previewed the song on TikTok on February 14, 2021. On August 26, 2021, Lil Nas X published another Montero announcement in a form of news, with "Thats What I Want" playing in the background. Hours before the album's release, the rapper uploaded a video on his YouTube channel entitled The Montero Show, where he presents his music videos from the least to the most favorite, but when he is about to announce the "Thats What I Want" video his water breaks. Deryck Whibley and Jason McCaslin talks about the Underclass Hero single of the song from the video. With the album's release, the song has been announced as its fourth single. On the same day it received airplay premiere on Australian mainstream radio station The Music Network and British BBC Radio 1. It impacted pop radios in Italy and the United States on September 24 and 28 respectively. Later it was sent to the US rhythmic contemporary stations on October 5. He debuted this song live on September 22, 2021, for BBC Radio 1's Live Lounge.

== Critical reception ==
Carl Wilson from Slate stated that "Thats What I Want" is a "fantastic" song and an "anthem of same-sex longing"; while Mike Wass of Variety called it "toe-tapper with massive radio appeal". Its chorus has been described as "indelible" by The Guardian's Alexis Petridis, "snappy" by Gil Kaufman of Billboard, and "stirring" in an article published on Entertainment Weekly by Maura Johnston. Calling its beat "infectious", David Smyth of Evening Standard said that Lil Nas X could have made the pronouns ambiguous for "mass appeal", but opposing to that he made the song "[ring] completely true". Writing for Rolling Stone, Jon Dolan assigned to the song adjectives such as "playful", "hopeful", "sweet", and "proud"; while New Statesman's Emily Bootle described it as an "innocent, emotive love song". Zoya Raza-Sheikh from Gay Times said it is a "soaring track packed with unapologetic queer heartache that builds the record's momentum". In an article published by Billboard in late September 2021, the song was described as "designed to be a charts favorite" by Stephen Daw, while Jason Lipshutz said that it "functions as a spiritual sequel to 'Montero (Call Me by Your Name)' (2021)".

== Commercial performance ==
"Thats What I Want" debuted at number 10 on Billboard Hot 100 on the chart issued October 2, 2021, giving Lil Nas X his third top ten debut and fifth top ten hit. It later peaked at number eight on the chart issued April 2, 2022. It charted within the top ten with the album's previous singles "Montero (Call Me by Your Name)" and "Industry Baby", giving the rapper his first time where three of his songs were simultaneously within top ten. It also appeared at number 5 on Streaming Songs chart with 24.2 million streams. Additionally, "Thats What I Want" debuted on the Mainstream Top 40 chart at number 34 and reached number one on the chart dated February 19, 2022, becoming Lil Nas X's third consecutive number one single on the chart. The song also went on to become his first multi-week chart topper on the Pop Airplay chart, retaining the top spot for 4 non-consecutive weeks.

It also debuted on Billboard's global charts, at number 4 on the main chart, while logging at number 8 on Excluding US chart with 39.6 million streams from outside the US.

Elsewhere, "Thats What I Want" became highest debut in UK Singles Chart on chart issue September 30, 2021, logging at number 10. It was also placed at number 7 on ARIA Singles Chart.

== Music video ==
A still from the music video, where Lil Nas X and his love interest are dressed like characters from 2005 film Brokeback Mountain.

The music video for "Thats What I Want" was directed by STILLZ and produced by Esteban Zuluaga, Malcolm Duncan, and Fabien Colas which premiered on September 17, 2021. During a football game at the fictional Montero University, whose players wear pink uniforms, Lil Nas X falls from the sky to crash on the field, causing him to injure his knee. As he is taken off the field, he meets the eyes of another player, played by Yai Ariza. The two of them meet alone in the locker room, where they begin to kiss. Later they are seen in a passionate sex scene in the shower, with Lil Nas X opening a Durex condom package.

In the second verse, the pair are seen next to a campfire in cowboy outfits as well as being intimate in a tent; the scene is a homage to Brokeback Mountain (2005). Next, Lil Nas X goes to the other man's house with flowers, only to discover he is married to a woman and has a child. Lil Nas X drives home in anguish, gets drunk, and eventually passes out. At the end of the video, Lil Nas X enters a church wearing a white wedding gown and walks down the aisle in tears. At the altar a priest, played by Billy Porter, gives him an electric guitar, on which Lil Nas X plays a solo.

Kaufman described the video as "steamy, drama-filled", adding that it is "fittingly high drama visual for an album that has already given us some other iconic videos for 'Industry Baby' and 'Montero (Call Me by Your Name)'." Writing for The Fader, Shaad D'Souza described it as "raunchy" and "cinematic". Wilson said that it is "tour de force performance of in-your-face queerness".

== Charts ==
=== Weekly charts ===
Weekly chart performance for "Thats What I Want"
Chart (2021–2022)	Peak position
Australia (ARIA)	7
Austria (Ö3 Austria Top 40)	7
Belgium (Ultratop 50 Flanders)	11
Belgium (Ultratop 50 Wallonia)	17
Canada Hot 100 (Billboard)	5
Canada AC (Billboard)	15
Canada CHR/Top 40 (Billboard)	1
Canada Hot AC (Billboard)	1
CIS Airplay (TopHit)	57
Croatia (HRT)	37
Czech Republic Airplay (ČNS IFPI)	2
Czech Republic Singles Digital (ČNS IFPI)	12
Denmark (Tracklisten)	8
Finland (Suomen virallinen lista)	10
France (SNEP)	39
Germany (GfK)	11
Global 200 (Billboard)	4
Greece International (IFPI)	10
Hungary (Rádiós Top 40)	2
Hungary (Single Top 40)	25
Hungary (Stream Top 40)	11
Iceland (Tónlistinn)	6
India International Singles (IMI)	13
Ireland (IRMA)	3
Italy (FIMI)	73
Japan Hot Overseas (Billboard)	7
Lithuania (AGATA)	11
Lithuania Airplay (TopHit)	169
Luxembourg (Billboard)	12
Mexico Airplay (Billboard)	27
Netherlands (Dutch Top 40)	9
Netherlands (Single Top 100)	22
New Zealand (Recorded Music NZ)	6
Norway (VG-lista)	7
Poland Airplay (ZPAV)	5
Portugal (AFP)	8
Romania Airplay (Media Forest)	5
Russia Airplay (TopHit)	106
San Marino (SMRRTV Top 50)	9
Singapore (RIAS)	9
Slovakia Airplay (ČNS IFPI)	12
Slovakia Singles Digital (ČNS IFPI)	11
South Africa (RISA)	18
Spain (PROMUSICAE)	51
Sweden (Sverigetopplistan)	12
Switzerland (Schweizer Hitparade)	10
UK Singles (Official Charts)	10
US Billboard Hot 100	8
US Adult Contemporary (Billboard)	19
US Adult Pop Airplay (Billboard)	1
US Dance Airplay (Billboard)	8
US Pop Airplay (Billboard)	1
US Rhythmic Airplay (Billboard)	19

=== Monthly charts ===
Monthly chart performance for "Thats What I Want"
Chart (2021)	Peak position
CIS Airplay (TopHit)	68

=== Year-end charts ===
2021 year-end chart performance for "Thats What I Want"
Chart (2021)	Position
Austria (Ö3 Austria Top 40)	72
Belgium (Ultratop Flanders)	81
CIS Airplay (TopHit)	175
Hungary (Stream Top 40)	80
Netherlands (Dutch Top 40)	51
Netherlands (Single Top 100)	96
Poland (Polish Airplay Top 100)	52
Portugal (AFP)	194
Switzerland (Schweizer Hitparade)	91

2022 year-end chart performance for "Thats What I Want"
Chart (2022)	Position
Australia (ARIA)	23
Austria (Ö3 Austria Top 40)	25
Belgium (Ultratop Flanders)	43
Belgium (Ultratop Wallonia)	57
Canada (Canadian Hot 100)	10
France (SNEP)	94
Germany (Official German Charts)	47
Global 200 (Billboard)	49
Hungary (Stream Top 40)	66
Lithuania (AGATA)	66
Netherlands (Dutch Top 40)	96
New Zealand (Recorded Music NZ)	48
Switzerland (Schweizer Hitparade)	35
US Billboard Hot 100	14
US Adult Contemporary (Billboard)	43
US Adult Top 40 (Billboard)	9
US Mainstream Top 40 (Billboard)	2

== Certifications ==
Certifications for "Thats What I Want"
Region	Certification	Certified units/sales
Australia (ARIA)	4× Platinum	280,000^{‡}
Belgium (BRMA)	Gold	20,000^{‡}
Brazil (Pro-Música Brasil)	Diamond	160,000^{‡}
Canada (Music Canada)	4× Platinum	320,000^{‡}
Denmark (IFPI Danmark)	Platinum	90,000^{‡}
France (SNEP)	Diamond	333,333^{‡}
Germany (BVMI)	Gold	200,000^{‡}
Italy (FIMI)	Platinum	100,000^{‡}
Mexico (AMPROFON)	Gold	70,000^{‡}
New Zealand (RMNZ)	2× Platinum	60,000^{‡}
Norway (IFPI Norway)	Gold	30,000^{‡}
Poland (ZPAV)	Platinum	50,000^{‡}
Portugal (AFP)	Platinum	10,000^{‡}
Spain (Promusicae)	Platinum	60,000^{‡}
Switzerland (IFPI Switzerland)	Platinum	20,000^{‡}
United Kingdom (BPI)	Platinum	600,000^{‡}
United States (RIAA)	3× Platinum	3,000,000^{‡}
Streaming
Greece (IFPI Greece)	Gold	1,000,000^{†}
Sweden (GLF)	Gold	4,000,000^{†}
^{‡} Sales+streaming figures based on certification alone.^{†} Streaming-only figures based on certification alone.

== Release history ==
Release dates and formats for "Thats What I Want"
Region	Date	Format	Label	Ref.
Italy	September 24, 2021	Radio airplay	Sony	
United States	September 27, 2021	Hot adult contemporary radio	Columbia	
United States	September 28, 2021	Contemporary hit radio	Columbia	
United States	October 5, 2021	Rhythmic contemporary radio	Columbia	
