= Tax Heaven 3000 =

- Publisher: MSCHF
- Platforms: Windows; macOS
- Release: March 22, 2023
- Genres: Dating sim, Tax compliance software

Tax Heaven 3000, abbreviated as TH3K, is a Japanese-styled dating simulator game released by American art collective MSCHF which helps the player prepare their federal income taxes. The game was released in March 2023 in preparation for the 2022 tax deadline by making the player go on dates with the protagonist in which they input personal information required to generate a tax return.

== Background ==
MSCHF, an American art collective, previously released a videogame on Steam titled Chair Simulator in 2021.

== Gameplay ==
Tax Heaven 3000 does not require an internet connection. The "visual novel dating game" has various scenarios for the player, in which they interact with a character named "Iris". The player goes on dates with Iris and "get to know each other," in which the player is required to input their personal details including their legal name, address, along with checking for potential tax benefit eligibility, as well as the player's social security number and their banking details. Tax Heaven 3000 then creates a PDF of the player's federal tax return for the IRS. In the game, Iris criticizes TurboTax and similar tax preparation software as "predatory, parasitic bottlenecks that deliberately complicate the tax filing process in order to make it unnavigable by ordinary people." The game features "Turbo", a character described as "an unsavory SaaS bro" whose 'likes' are characterized as "corporate lobbying, confusing forms, dark UX, and fleece vests".

== Release ==
Tax Heaven 3000 was released by MSCHF on March 22, 2023. It was released on itch.io and, for only around half a day, Steam, before being removed from the Steam Store by Valve, which did not comment on the reasons for the removal. According to Daniel Greenberg, the co-founder of MSCHF, the game was set to be released on April 4, 2023, after it later "went through Steam's standard verification process." It is available for Windows and macOS devices, and was released as a free-to-play game, although MSCHF also released a US$90 collector's edition as part of the project which contained a physical copy of the game, an instruction manual, an IRS mailing envelope, and a 5-foot dakimakura depicting the character Iris. Because the game is offline, Greenberg stated that the game was "probably safer than most big box tax software" regarding the handling of personal information. The game was also released as a message in criticism of TurboTax. The gameplay itself was described by TechCrunch as "pretty PG-13, though there are a few innuendos." MSCHF also released an "X-rated patch" for the project, which links to a Wattpad post titled "The BOFA Encounter", a not safe for work story "about Iris' abduction from TurboTax". Tax Heaven 3000 was also described as being "suitable for single filers without dependents" by MSCHF.

== Reception ==
The game received mixed reviews on itch.io. Kelly Phillips Erb of Forbes wrote that "the idea of handing my personal and financial information over in a game felt… weird," though acknowledged that the delivery is no different than tax software programs. Cecily Mauran of Mashable joked that "at least [Iris] won't break your heart like the IRS." Wailin Wong and Brittany Cronin, of NPR's The Indicator from Planet Money podcast, complimented the game for what they remarked as having a 2000s style.
