= Finger on the App =

2020 app and competition

- Screenshot
- Developer: MSCHF
- Release: June 30, 2020; 6 years ago
- Stable release: v1.0
- Written in: Python
- Operating system: Android (Android 9 and up) iOS (iOS 12 and up)
- Available in: English
- Type: Application software
- Website: fingeronthe.app

Finger on the App was a 2020 smartphone app. Players had to hold down on the app for as long as possible, and the person who held down the longest would win USD$25,000. It was created by YouTuber MrBeast and art collective MSCHF. Four players held down for 70 hours, at which point the game was ended. They each received $20,000.

Finger on the App 2 was a 2021 sequel. Unlike the original, it featured in-game purchases and a battle mode. The person who held down the longest won $100,000. The second-place finisher won $20,000.

== Finger on the App ==
The app was launched on Apple's App Store on June 30, 2020, at 3:00 PM Eastern Standard Time. It is a collaboration with MrBeast and the Brooklyn-based art collective MSCHF. The app claimed to be uncheatable; MSCHF's head of strategy, Daniel Greenberg, said they've "taken God knows how many precautions to prevent cheating, this app is uncheatable." The game started with 1.3 million players, and after 48 hours, there were 15 players left. The app was active for only 70 hours after its release, with it ending on July 3, at exactly 1:15 PM Eastern Standard Time. Four players were awarded $20,000 each as they tied for the first place. MrBeast said in a tweet: "Dear the four remaining contestants with your finger still on the app, I'm ending it here. Three days is insane! You ALL win and will ALL receive $20,000! CONGRATULATIONS!". On TikTok, videos with the hashtag #fingerontheapp had 105.9 million views collectively.

== Finger on the App 2 ==
Avatar of MrBeast

MrBeast
(@MrBeast)
tweeted:

After 2 days and 3 hours

@Swagbacon123 was the last person with his finger on the app and won $100,000!!!! CONGRATULATIONS!

I also felt bad for second place person so I'm giving them $20,000 as well ❤️

March 22, 2021

MrBeast announced Finger on the App 2, a sequel to the original game, on December 26, 2020, with the initial release date being December 29, 2020. Around 2 and a half months after the initial announcement, a release date of March 20, 2021, 5 PM Eastern Standard Time, was announced. The ending prize was USD$100,000, with the countdown being put on the MrBeast Games website. There was a delay was due to the system of the app crashing because of a massive amount of downloads. The rules stated that players must be at least 18 years old and reside in either the United States, Canada (excluding the province of Quebec), and Mexico. It was released for Android and iOS. A major difference between the original app and Finger on the App 2 is that there were now in-game purchases, where users could buy extra lives. There was also a battle mode where users could earn cookies, a form of ingame currency, which could also be used to buy extra lives. After 2 days and 3 hours, a user by the name of Swagbacon123 received the $100,000 prize. The second place user was awarded $20,000.

=== App glitches ===
According to many sources, the app had many problems including touch sensory issues and in-app purchasing problems with those who bought extra lives never receiving extra lives and being unable to get refunds. After the challenge, MrBeast directly offered refunds to anyone who bought extra lives.
