= M. Frank Rudy =

American inventor and engineer

- Born: Marion Frank Rudy; January 24, 1925; Cleveland, Ohio, U.S.
- Died: December 13, 2009 (aged 84); Calabasas, California, U.S.
- Resting place: San Fernando Mission Cemetery
- Education: Case Western Reserve University
- Engineering career
- Employer(s): Nike, Inc.
- Significant design: Inventor of Nike Air Sole

Marion Frank Rudy (24 January 1925 – 13 December 2009) was an American aeronautical engineer and inventor, most known for patenting what would become the Nike Air Sole.

== Early life and education ==
Rudy was born in Cleveland, Ohio and raised in Fairview Park, Ohio.

He was a graduate of Fairview High School and Case Western Reserve University's class of 1950, majoring in mechanical and aeronautical engineering. He was also a member of the Phi Kappa Tau fraternity.

== Career ==
Rudy's first job after graduation was with NASA, where he worked on projects for the Saturn and Apollo rocket engines.

With a slow down in the space industry in 1969, Ruby, an avid skier, took a job at Nike Inc. in Oregon. In 1977, Rudy designed a cushioning system based on an inert gas encapsulated in polyurethane plastic. The first shoe to implement the technology would be the Nike Air Tailwind in 1978. The design was ultimately trademarked by Nike as the "Air" sole.

Throughout his career, Rudy ultimately held more than 250 patents.

== Death ==
Rudy died in his home in California on December 13, 2009. He was 84 years old. Rudy is buried in San Fernando Mission Cemetery.

== Legacy ==
The 19 varsity athletic teams at his alma mater, Case Western Reserve Spartans, wear a special patch on their uniforms commemorating him and his invention. The emblem has Rudy's initials, MFR, with a 3D design of special texture and shine to resemble inflated air sole look, and has orbiting planets pay tribute to his career as an aerospace engineer.
