= Satan Shoes =

Series of custom Nike Air Max 97 shoes

Promotional image of the Satan Shoes

Satan Shoes were a series of custom Nike Air Max 97 shoes, created in 2021 as a collaboration between American musician Lil Nas X and MSCHF, a Brooklyn, New York art collective. Their design and marketing gained controversy through prominent satanic imagery. Nike, Inc. sued MSCHF for trademark infringement, false designation of origin, trademark dilution, and unfair competition. A settlement was reached in July 2021 which required MSCHF to offer refunds to any buyer who wished to return their shoes.

== Design and promotion ==
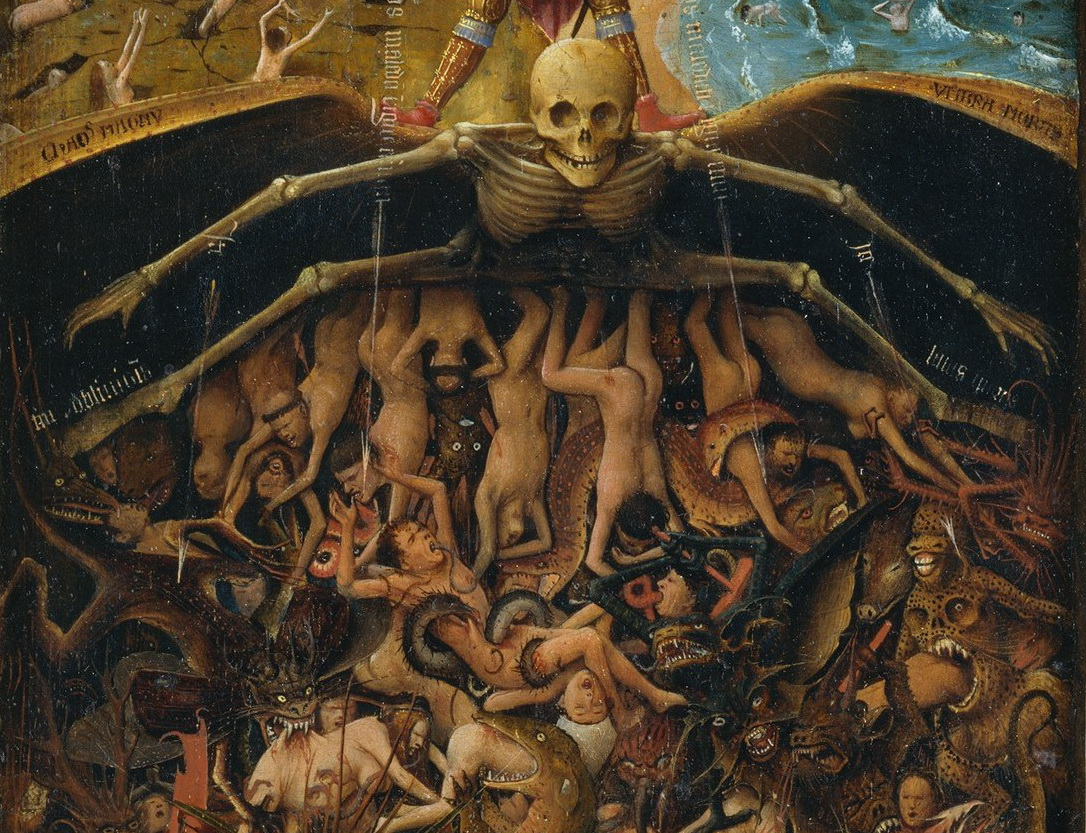
A detail from Jan van Eyck's Crucifixion and Last Judgement diptych (pictured) appears to be present on the shoebox.

Each pair of shoes is black, and features a bronze pentagram on the laces and an inverted cross, while on the sides of the shoes is a reference to the Biblical passage Luke 10:18. MSCHF claims that the shoes are made with "60cc of ink and 1 drop of human blood". According to MSCHF co-founder Daniel Greenberg, the blood came from "about six" MSCHF employees. A detail from Jan van Eyck's Last Judgement appears to be present on the packaging.

The shoes were released alongside the music video for Lil Nas X's song "Montero (Call Me by Your Name)", where the rapper can be seen descending into Hell on a stripper pole and giving Satan a lap dance before killing him and presumably becoming the new ruler of Hell. A pair of the shoes can be seen on Satan's feet in the music video. Additionally, only 666 pairs of the shoes were produced, priced at $1,018 each. The shoes sold out in under a minute.

Several publications compared the shoes to a comic book published by Marvel Comics in 1977 based on the rock band Kiss, for which the band members mixed vials of their own blood into the red ink used for printing the books.

== Artistic intent ==
A spokesperson for MSCHF told the New York Times the shoes were works of artistic expression "intended to comment on the absurdity of the collaboration culture practiced by some brands".

== Court case ==
Nike contended before federal judge Eric R. Komitee that the Satan Shoes were manufactured without authorization from Nike. Nike's lawyers argued that they have "submitted evidence that even sophisticated sneakerheads were confused" by the shoes. Nike lawyers cited the Rogers test.

Nike released a statement in response to the controversy generated, saying "Nike did not design or release these shoes and we do not endorse them". Additionally, the company initiated a lawsuit against MSCHF, alleging that they had made consumers believe that "Nike is endorsing satanism" and that the shoes and their promotion represented trademark infringement, false designation of origin, trademark dilution, and unfair competition.

As of April 1, 2021, Nike succeeded in obtaining a restraining order against MSCHF, blocking sales of the Satan Shoes. At the time the restraining order went into effect, all but one pair of the shoes had already been shipped to buyers. By July Nike had accepted a settlement that required MSCHF to offer refunds to any buyer who returned their purchase, as well as to any buyer of a previous "Jesus Shoes" release by MSCHF. At the time of the settlement the shoes were being offered on auction sites for as much as $15,000.

In response to the court case, Lil Nas X later released a prelude video for his next song "Industry Baby", which worked as a spoof of the case, staging a fake "Nike vs. Lil Nas X" trial in the supreme court, during which people discuss the Satan Shoes before condemning the rapper for being gay.

== Reception ==
The shoes were met with disapproval from some sports, entertainment, political and religious figures, including from basketball player Nick Young, Free Chapel pastor Jentezen Franklin, American football quarterback Trevor Lawrence, fellow rapper Joyner Lucas, evangelical pastor Mark Burns, conservative pundit Candace Owens and South Dakota governor Kristi Noem. The Church of Satan gave its full approval to the "Montero" music video and the shoes. Lil Nas X told critics via Twitter his agenda was to "make people stay the fuck out of other people’s lives and stop dictating who they should be." The rapper later called out the double standard after skateboarder Tony Hawk's announcement about releasing blood-infused skateboards didn't receive any backlash for the idea.
