= Nike Air Max =

Line of shoes produced by Nike, Inc.

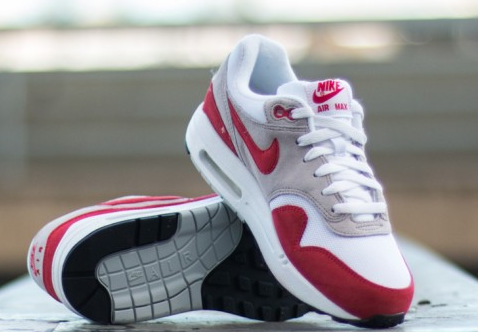
- A pair of Nike Air Max 1
- Type: Sneakers
- Inventor: Nike, Inc.
- Inception: 1986; 40 years ago
- Manufacturer: Nike, Inc.
- Website: nike.com/air-max-shoes

Nike Air Max is a line of shoes produced by Nike, Inc., with the first model released in 1986. Air Max shoes are identified by their midsoles incorporating flexible urethane pouches filled with pressurized gas, visible from the exterior of the shoe and intended to provide cushioning to the underfoot. Air Max was conceptualized by Tinker Hatfield, who initially worked for Nike designing stores.

== Overview ==
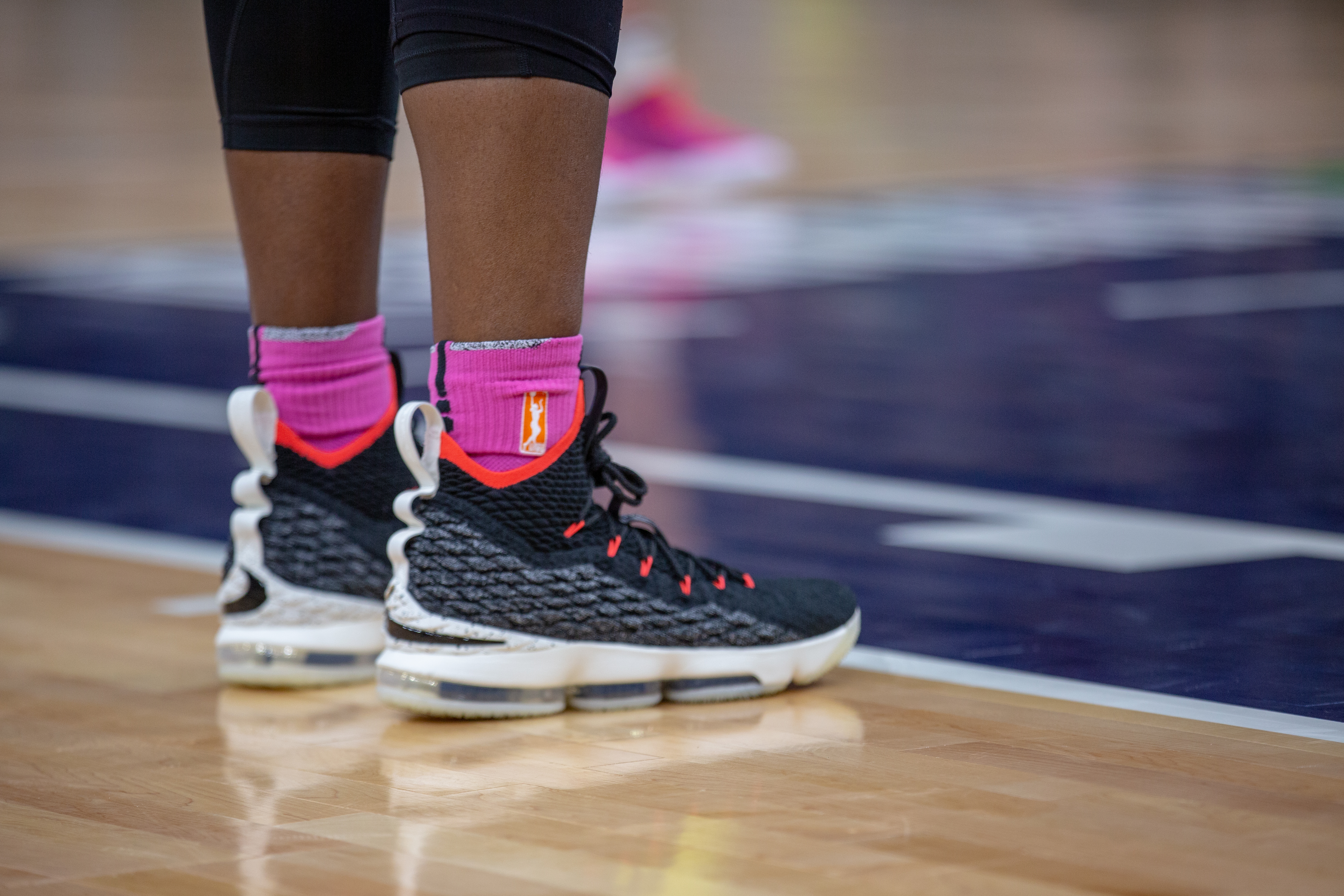
Sylvia Fowles wearing Nike LeBron 15 Air Max (2018)

Air technology was first used by Nike when M. Frank Rudy, an aeronautical engineer, approached them with the idea and design in 1977. The first shoe to implement the technology would be the Nike Air Tailwind in 1978. Air Max was conceptualized by Tinker Hatfield, who initially worked for Nike designing stores. As the name indicates, all Air Max shoes feature one or more translucent pouches of pressurized gas embedded in the midsole and visible from the outside of the shoe. Referred to as "Air units" or "airbags," their stated purpose is to provide superior cushioning to traditional foam while also reducing weight. The design originated from the company wanting to implement bigger air units in the sole but not being able to cover them up properly like previous models. The effectiveness of the technology for this purpose is disputed; nevertheless, the shoes enjoy consistent popularity, especially among sneaker enthusiasts and collectors.

The size, design, and number of air units varies within the product line; the "retro" Air Max 1 simply includes one small unit under the heel, while in the contemporary Air VaporMax, effectively the entire midsole is composed of air units with no conventional foam present.

== Culture and fashion ==
The line of sneakers is popular amongst many subcultures.

In the mid-1990s the line, particularly the Air Max 95, experienced such a surge of popularity in Japan that it led to a phenomenon known as "Air Max hunting". The extremely inflated prices of the shoes led to a rash of muggings in the normally-peaceful country wherein Air Max wearers were attacked and their shoes were stolen. Even used shoes were in demand, and fakes also became a problem.

== Models ==
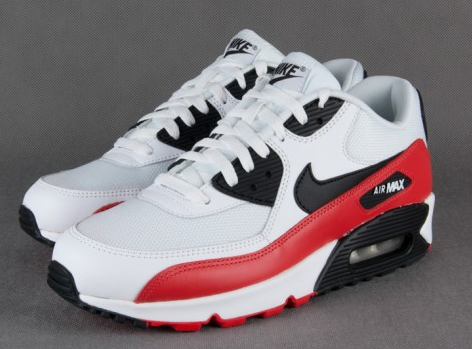
Nike Air Max 90

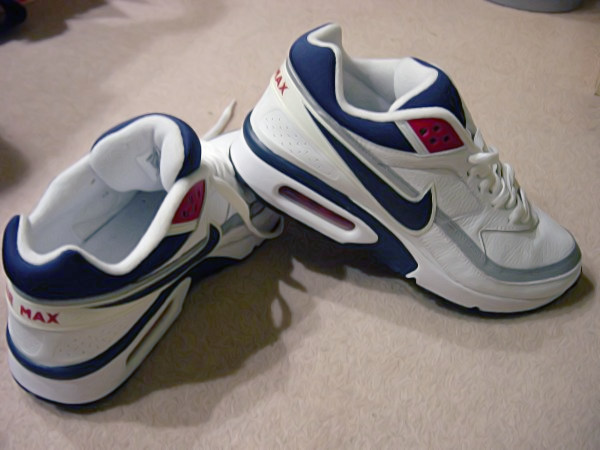
Nike Air Max BW

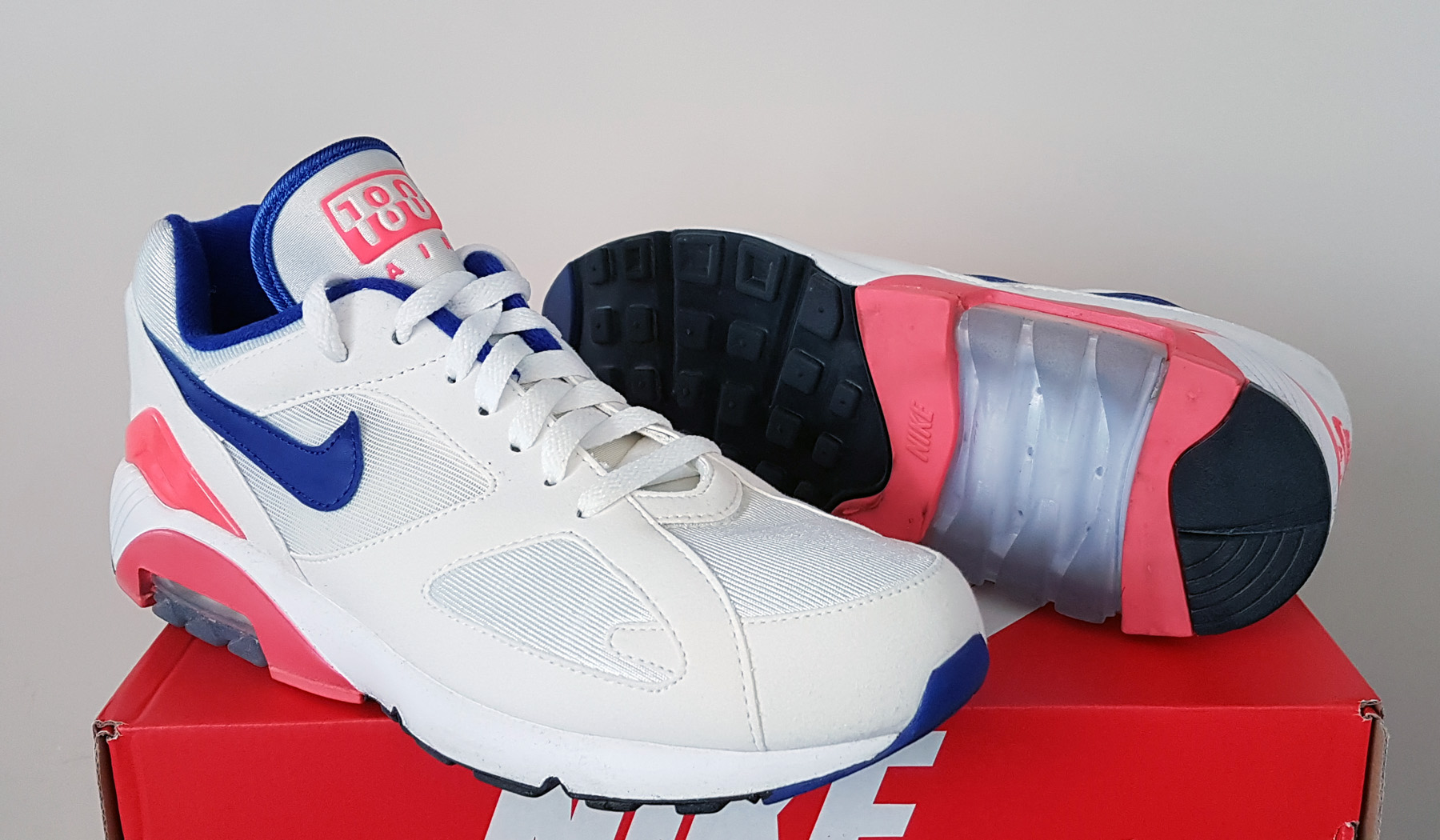
Nike Air Max 180

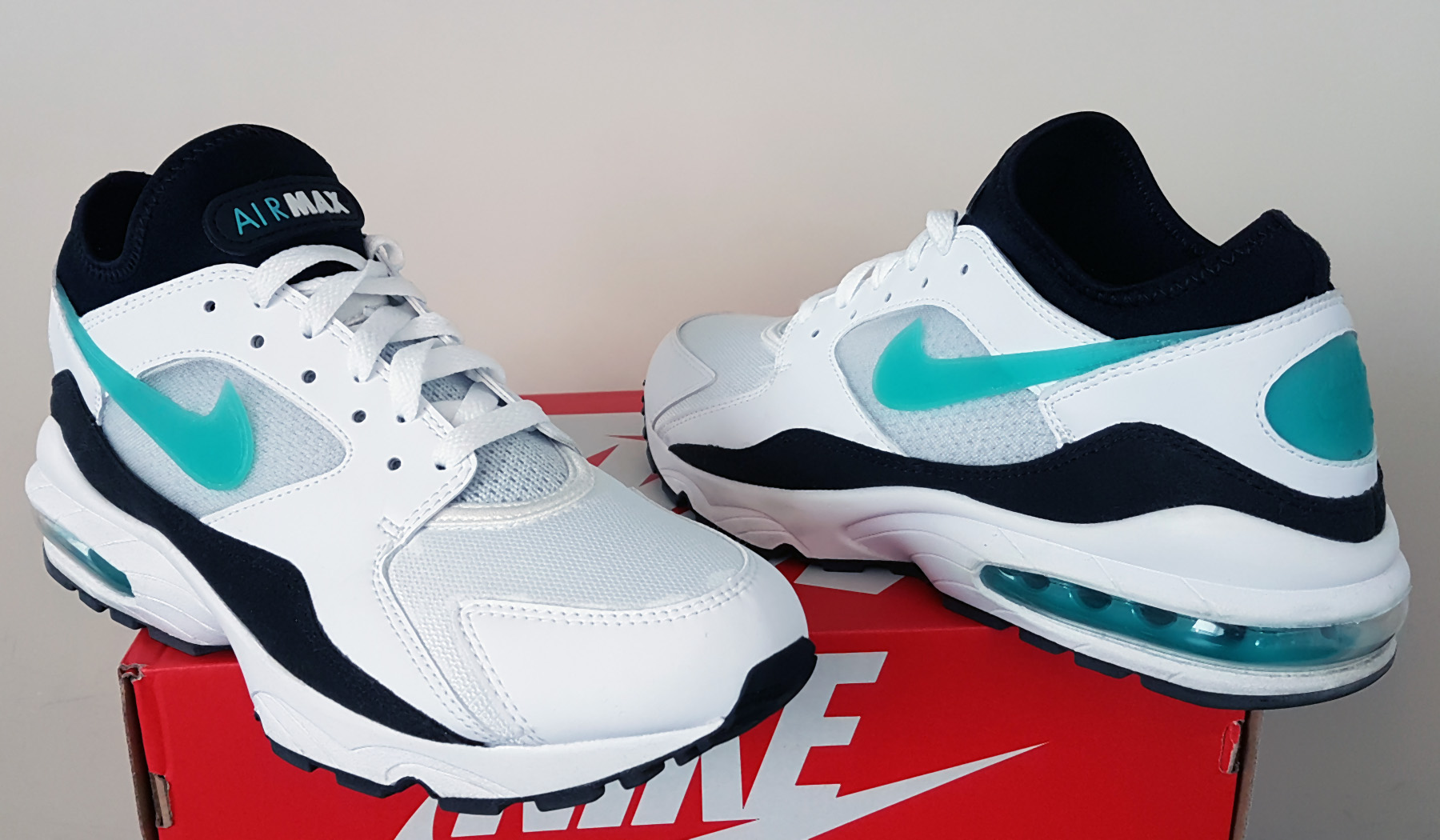
Nike Air Max 93

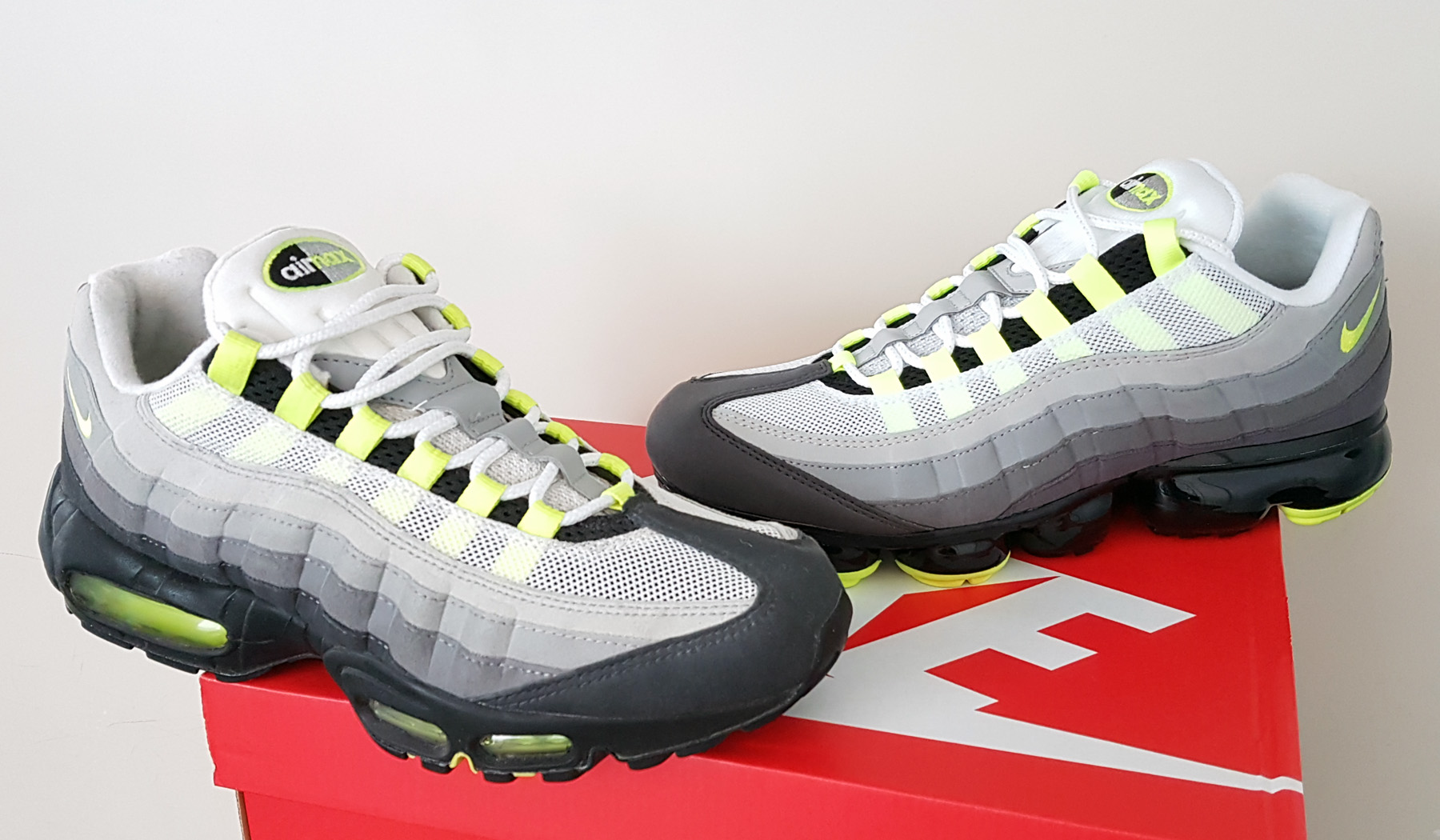
Nike Air Max 95 (1995) and Nike VaporMax 95 (2018)

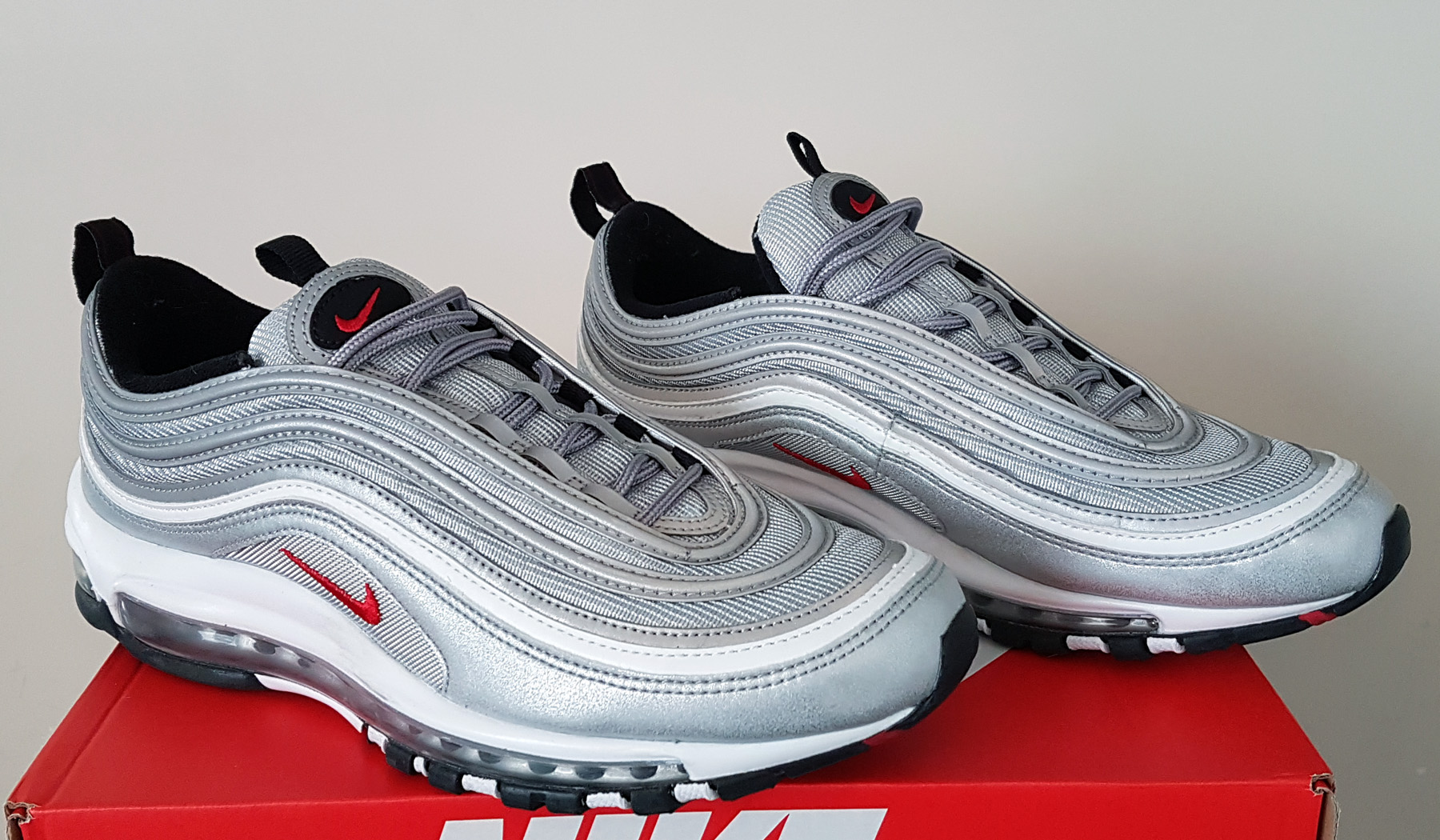
Nike Air Max 97

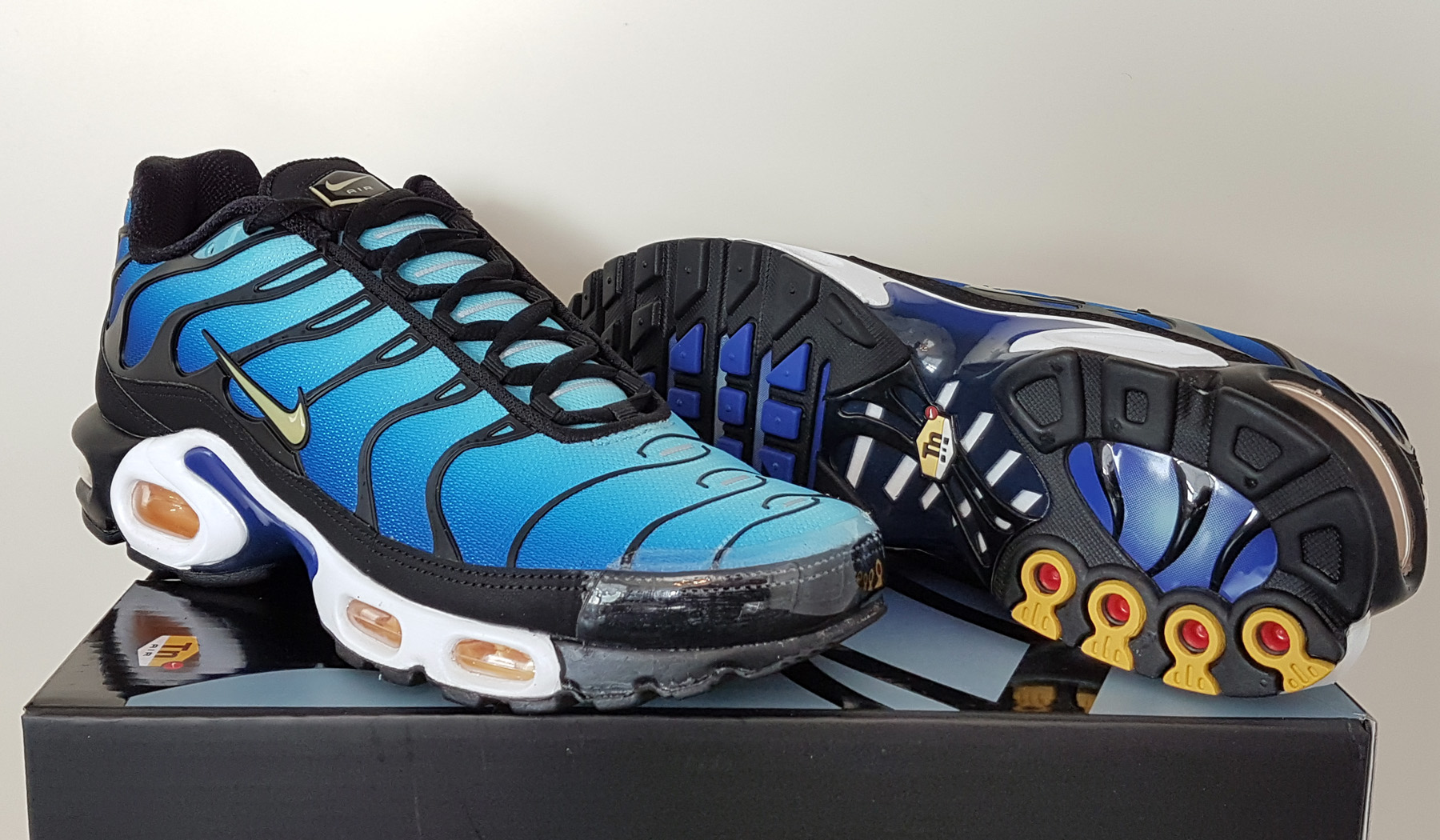
Nike Air Max Plus

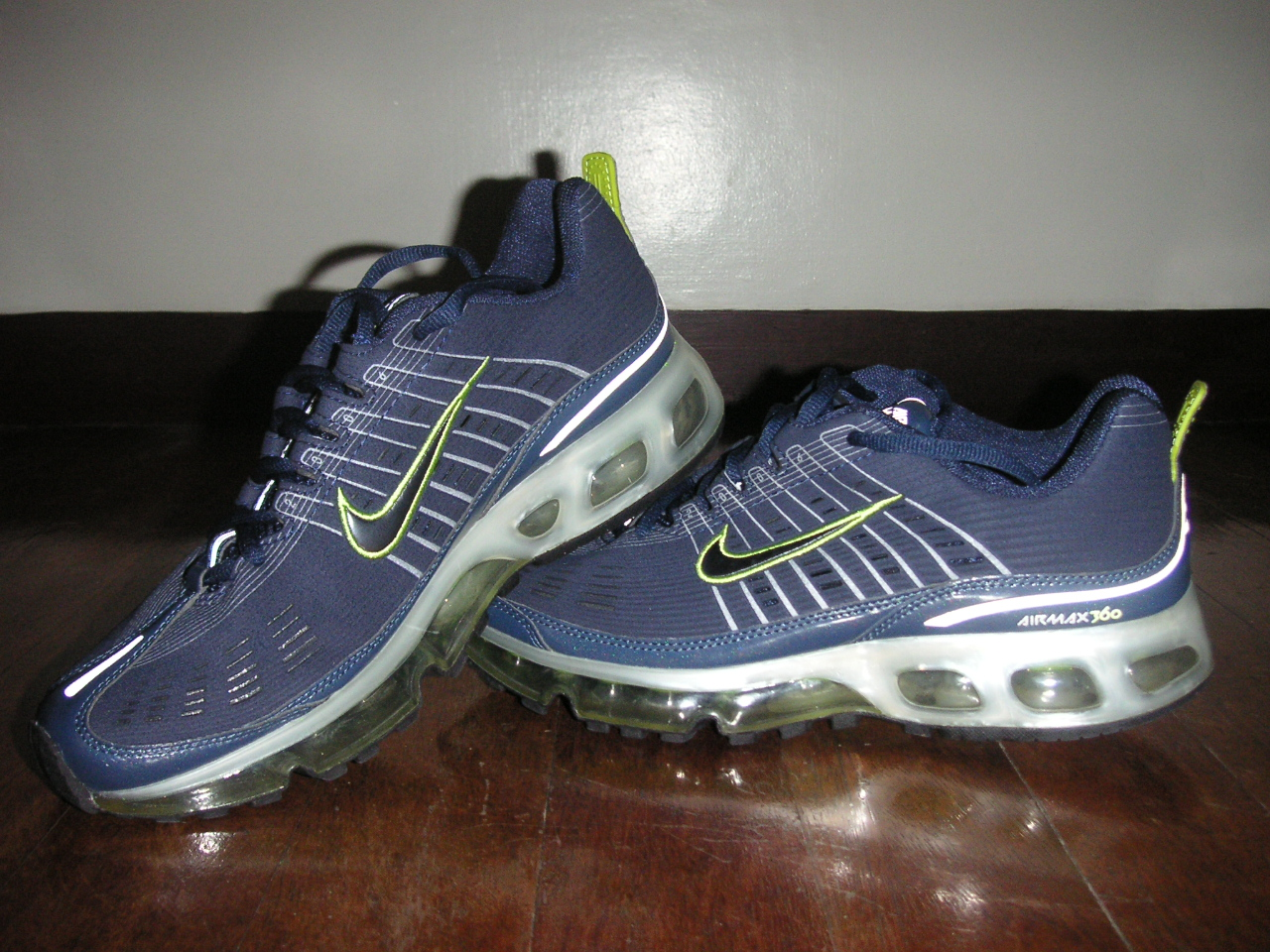
Nike Air Max 360

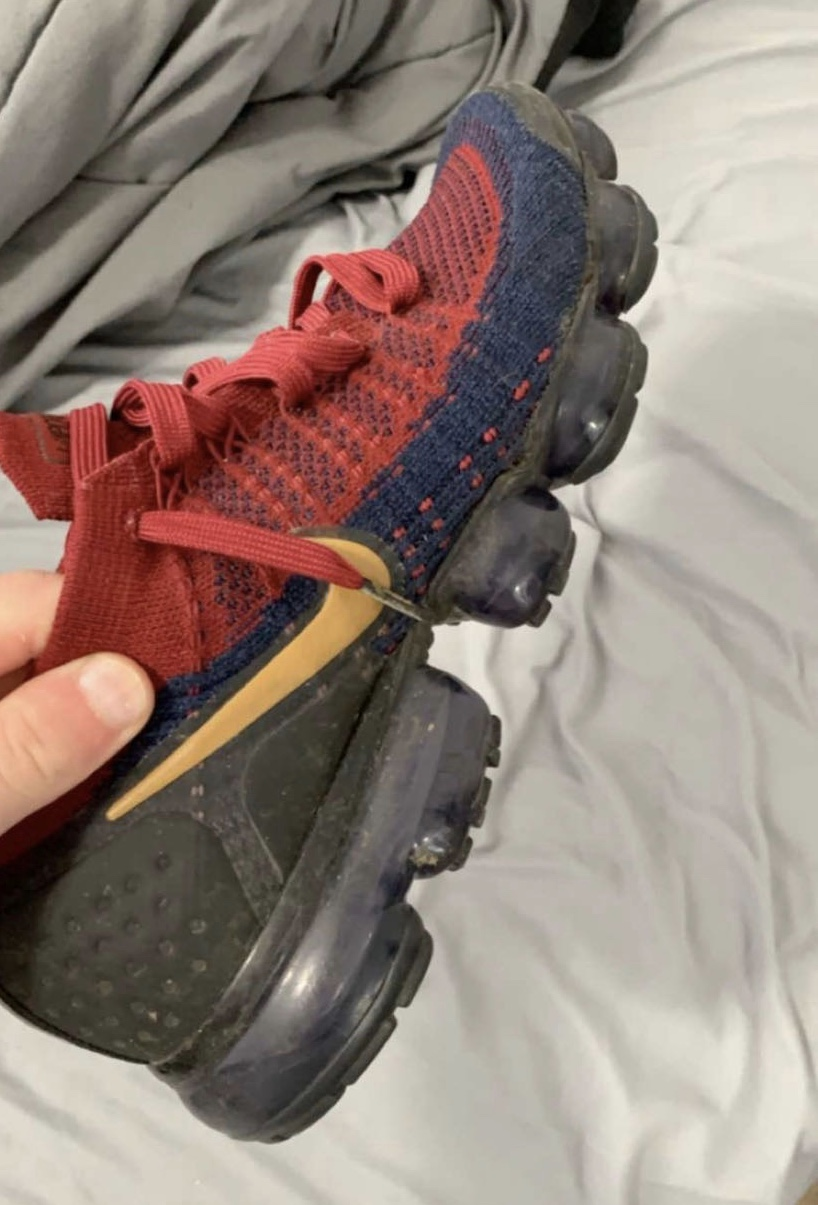
Nike VaporMax

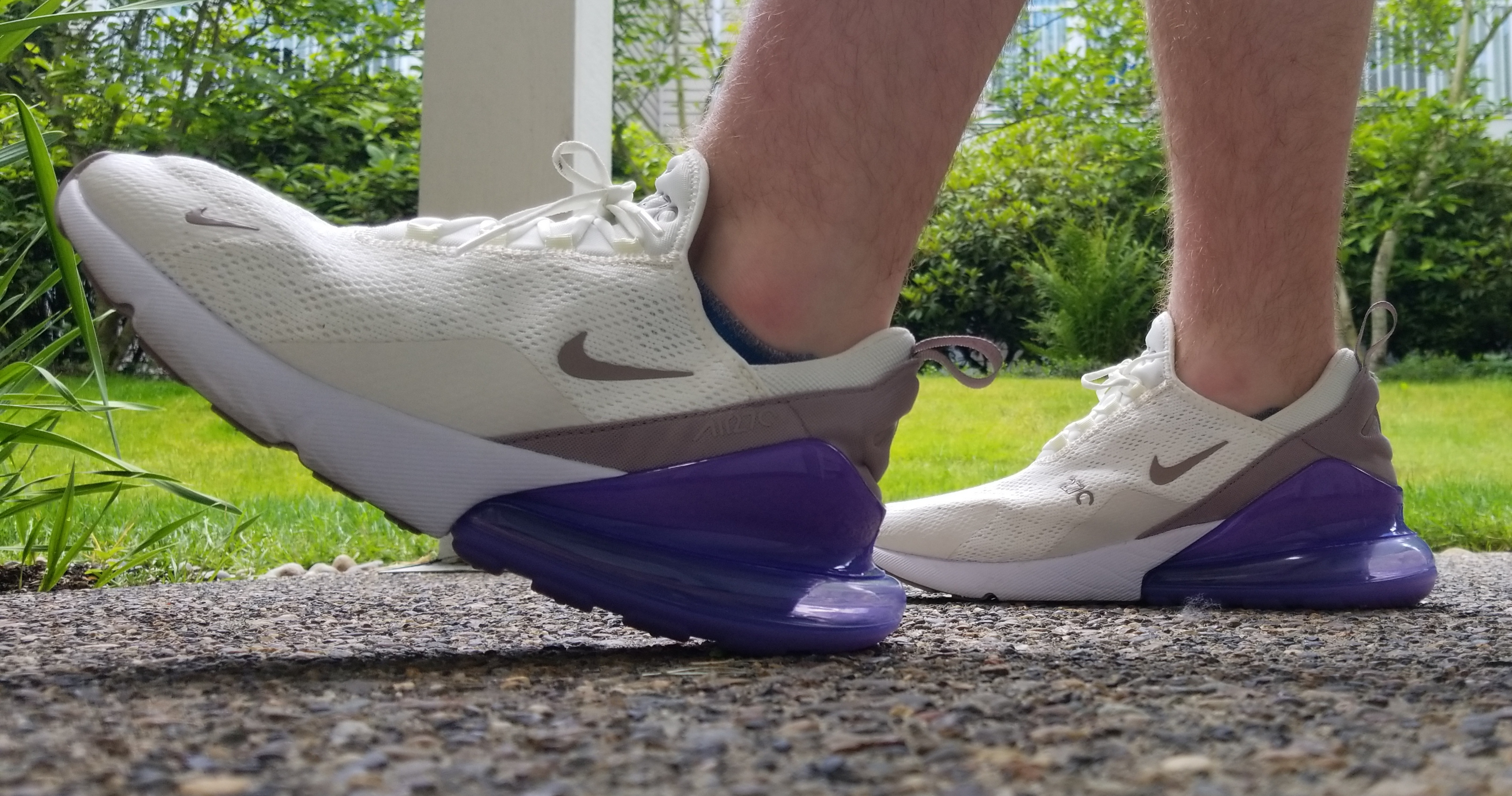
Nike Air Max 270

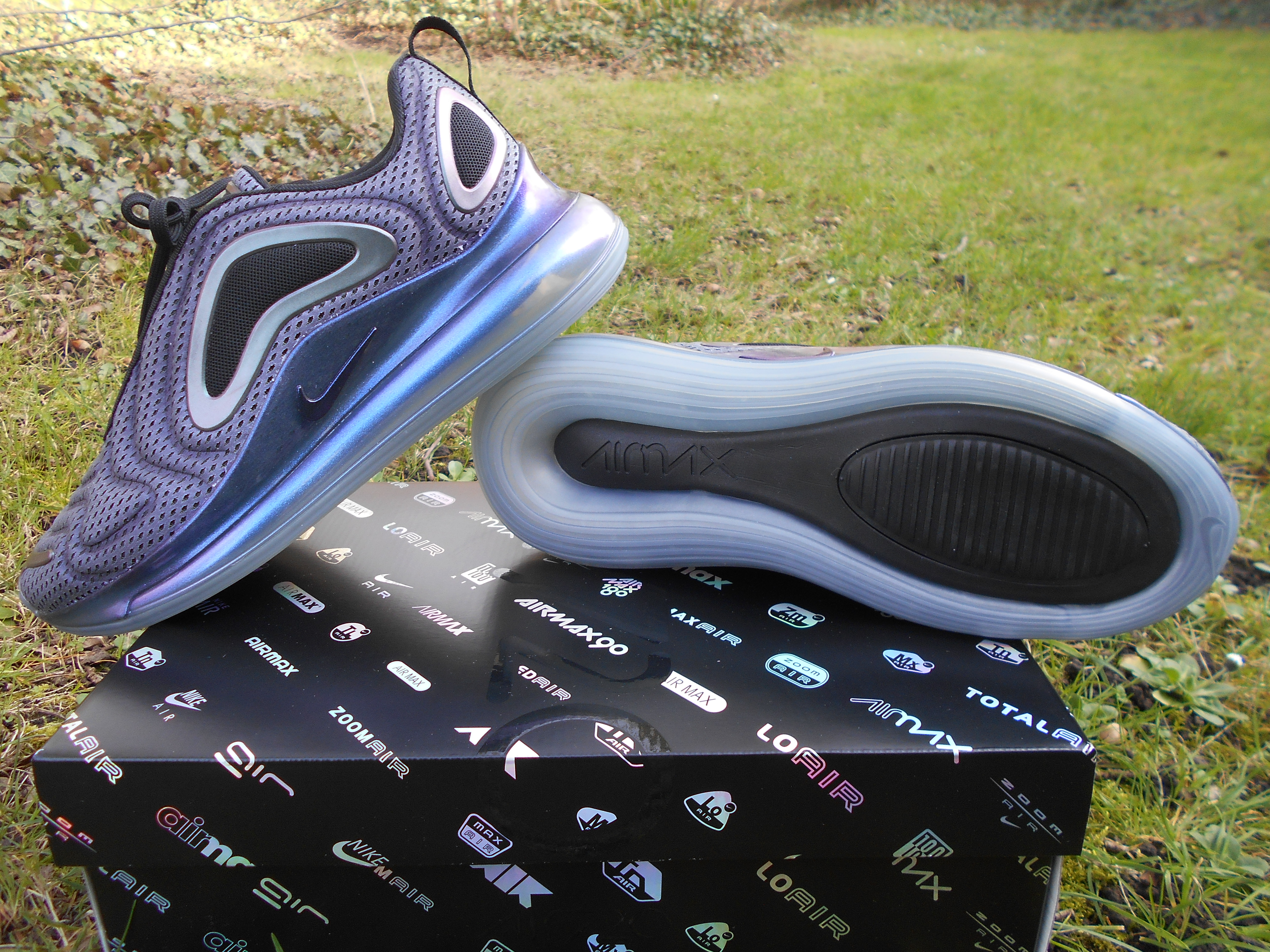
Nike Air Max 720

=== Air Max 1 ===
Released in 1986 as simply the Air Max, the Air Max 1 was the first shoe to employ Max Air technology. All Air Max designs starting with Max 1 were marketed for running until 2018's Air Max 270. Its upper was composed of nylon and synthetic felt, with a leather version being released in 1988. Its original development, however, showed issues within the big bubble when exposed to varying temperatures and had a tendency to pop. This in turn caused a recall and a reintroduction of The Air Max one as it is today with slight changes to the midsole and bubble sizing. However we saw a return of the "Air Max 86 Big Bubble" in 2023. The Air Max 1 continues to enjoy significant popularity with sneaker enthusiasts, and Nike re-releases the model with original and new exterior designs ("colorways") on a regular basis.

=== Air Max Light ===
Released in 1989 as the Air Max II, the Air Max Light weighed less than the original, achieved by replacing the forefoot polyurethane midsole with one made of EVA foam. Re-released in 2007, Nike has continued to release additional colorways.

=== Air Max 90 ===
The Air Max 90 was released in 1990 and known as the Air Max III until 2000, when it was reissued taking its name from the year of its launch. The original colourway of white/black/cool grey with infrared was chosen to exaggerate the thickness of the sole air cushion. The upper featured Duromesh, synthetic felt and synthetic leather. Nike specially designed a pair of Nike Air Max 90s for President George H. W. Bush. Images of the customized sneakers have been seen around the Department of Nike Archives, and feature AIR PRES branding along with what appears to be a unique colorway.

=== Air Max BW ===
Released in 1991 as Air Classic BW and also known as Air Max IV, the "BW" in the name stood for "Big Window" which was due to the bigger air unit in the sole of the shoe.

=== Air Max 180 ===
Released in 1991, the Air Max 180 featured a larger air unit visible through the outsole. The technology was later used in the Air Force 180 sneaker.

=== Air Max 93 ===
Released in 1993 as the Air Max 270, the Air Max 93 introduced a 270-degree air unit and colored air units to the range. Nike employed new manufacturing processes to provide the larger and more exposed air unit greater protection. The upper featured a more sock-like fit derived from 1991's Air Huarache sneaker.

=== Air Max2 CB 94 ===
The Air Max2 CB 94 was released in 1994. Designed as a basketball shoe by Tracy Teague, it was inspired by professional basketball player Charles Barkley.

=== Air Max 95 ===
The visual design of the Air Max 95 was created by Sergio Lozano, who based the design on the human anatomy, with the spine of the shoe resembling the human spine and the materials intended to represent skin, ribs, and tendons. The Air Max 95 was the first pair in the line to utilize two air cushions in the forefoot and used air pressure technology to fit the curvature of the wearer's forefoot. The first colorway was black, neon yellow and white. Neon yellow was used to emphasize the multiple air units. The shoe also introduced a smaller Nike swoosh minimized in the rear side panel. Original releases featured a "25 PSI" air pressure reading on the rear air unit. Uppers also featured 3M Scotchlite material.

The product was referenced in the hip hop song "Hate It or Love It" by The Game, which was a worldwide top 10 hit in 2005. It was also referenced by rappers Gucci Mane in the single "Bricks" and Waka Flocka Flame on the track "Head First" in his 2009 mixtape, "Lebron Flocka James". The rapper Eminem designed a limited-edition range of Air Maxes sold for charity.

The shoe’s former UK price of £110 led to the shoes receiving the nickname 110s among locals in the English city of Liverpool, where the shoe is known for its extreme popularity among locals.

In summer 2025, Nike announced the release of the limited-edition 'Muscle' line of the Nike Air Max 95 in collaboration with the Yu-Gi-Oh! series, portrayed as "Air Muscle" luxury brand athletic shoes worn by character Jounouchi Katsuya or Joey Wheeler and as the central story focus in the Muscle Hunters storyline arc of the original 1997 Yu-Gi-Oh! manga, where Joey tries to obtain the shoes for cheap from a reputed if shady independent fashion store in Domino City. The 'Muscle' line comes in two variants: the 'Joey' variant, exclusive to US and global releases, based upon the Yu-Gi-Oh! anime, and the 'Jounouchi' variant, exclusive to Japan, based upon the Yu-Gi-Oh! manga.

=== Air Max 97 ===
The Air Max 97 was first released in 1997 as a running shoe. Designed by Christian Tresser, its look was said to be inspired by high-speed Japanese bullet trains or the titanium metal frames on mountain bikes. Introduced in a metallic "Silver Bullet" colorway, it had a nearly full-length visible air unit, and the uppers featured a hidden lacing system and three lines made from Scotchlite.

The Air Max 97 retailed at $150, about $10 more than its predecessor. It enjoyed much popularity in Italy, where it was re-released in 2007 for its 10th anniversary. In 2017, Nike marked the 20th anniversary of the Air Max 97 by releasing many colorways and collaborations.

==== Satan Shoes ====
In March 2021, musician Lil Nas X collaborated with viral marketing company MSCHF to release "Satan Shoes", which were black Nike Air Max 97 shoes with satanic theming and created with "1 drop of human blood". The shoes were limited to 666 pairs, and caused controversy upon release, leading to Nike issuing a lawsuit against MSCHF. MSCHF had previously released "Jesus Shoes", a range of white Air Max 97 shoes which contained "60cc of holy water from the River Jordan".

=== Air Max Plus ===
Released in 1998, the Air Max Plus introduced Nike's Tuned Air system (TN), and as such became retrospectively known as the Air Max TN, Air Max Tuned, or Air Max Tuned 1 (TN1). Designed by Sean McDowell, the Air Max Plus featured transverse waves inspired by palm trees, and a prominent arch shank inspired by a whale tail. The initial release featured a "Hyper Blue" colorway, characterized by a fading blue airbrush effect. The Nike swoosh had a slightly irregular appearance as a border was added along the inner edge, as opposed to the outer surface. When talking about the design in an interview with mint. McDowell said “The Air Max Plus 1 almost never happened. The executives at Footlocker didn’t like it very much. It was too progressive and scared the 40-50 year old white men.” Although the shoe only had modest success in North America, in Europe they were massively popular—particularly in France, where the Plus grew to enjoy iconic status among youth culture in Paris and Marseille, with the nickname Le Requin ("The Shark"). Australia was another major market for the Air Max Plus—the shoe became popular with the youth gang culture known locally as Eshays, and wearers have been banned from some pubs and clubs due to the Eshay subculture surrounding the shoe.

=== Air Max 360 ===
On January 21, 2006, Nike launched the Air Max 360, a new shoe design that utilized Max Air throughout the shoe's midsole. In September 2006 Nike introduced a special 'one time only pack' which fused the 360 model with three classics. The three shoes used were the Air Max 90, Air Max 95, and Air Max 97. For this special release, the design of the 360 sole was used in place of the normal sole of the three classics. The shoes were released in the three original colors: red for the Air Max 90, green/yellow for the Air Max 95, and grey/silver for the Air Max 97.

=== Air VaporMax ===
The Air VaporMax released in March 2017, and was the first Air Max shoe to use no foam in the midsole. It discarded a traditional midsole/outsole design and in place used several entirely hollow air pouches, not connected to one another and positioned in different areas in accordance with where the wearer's foot would naturally strike. The VaporMax sole itself has not been significantly innovated upon since its initial release, but original shoes using the sole design continue to be released, including several "hybrids" which fuse a VaporMax sole with the upper design of an older Air Max shoe such as the Air Max 95, 97, and 360.

=== Air Max 270 ===
The shoe was originally released on 1 February 2018. It was named "270" for the 270 degrees of visibility in the Air unit around the shoe, and was inspired by the Air Max 93 and 180 shoes. It was the tallest Air unit to ever be released at the time, measuring 32 mm.

=== Air Max 720 ===
Nike debuted their second Air unit to be designed for lifestyle purposes with the Air Max 720 in 2019. It is 38 mm at its highest point. A New colours of the Air Max 720 and additional designs based on its Air unit, including the basketball-inspired Air Max 720 SATRN and a hybrid based on the retro Air More up-tempo, continue to be released.

=== Air Max 200 ===
Released in 2019, the Nike Air Max 200 featured one of the largest visible Air units of its time, providing enhanced cushioning and comfort. The design was inspired by natural phenomena such as lava flows and ocean waves, and the model offered a wide range of colorways aimed at lifestyle and casual wear markets.

=== Air Max 2090 ===
Debuting in 2020, the Nike Air Max 2090 reimagined the iconic Air Max 90 silhouette with futuristic design elements and updated cushioning. It retained the heel Air unit as a nod to its predecessor while introducing modern upper, translucent panels and bold lines. The 2090 was positioned as a tribute to the past and a step toward Nike's future of footwear innovation.

=== Air Max Pre-Day ===
The Nike Air Max Pre-Day was released in 2021, combining vintage running shoe aesthetics with modern sustainability goals. The model incorporated at least 20% recycled materials by weight and featured a retro upper paired with a modern, exposed heel Air unit. It was part of Nike’s broader Move to Zero campaign focused on reducing environmental impact.

=== Air Max Scorpion ===
Unveiled in 2022, the Air Max Scorpion introduced one of the most radical redesigns in the Air Max family, featuring a full-length Air sole unit engineered using digital tools and data-driven pressure mapping. The shoe was designed to maximize step-in comfort, with a Flyknit upper and bold platform aesthetic that signaled a new era in Air Max performance and style.

=== Air Max Pulse ===
Launched in 2023, the Air Max Pulse combined a sleek, urban-inspired silhouette with updated Air technology tailored for lifestyle comfort. It featured a textile-wrapped midsole and a redesigned Air unit that focused on improved underfoot feel and bounce. The Pulse was positioned as a versatile model bridging the gap between performance innovation and streetwear fashion.

=== Air Max DN ===
The Air Max DN was introduced on Air Max Day, March 26, 2024. This launch not only celebrated the 10th anniversary of Air Max Day but also marked the debut of Nike's future-forward Air technology called Dynamic Air. Priced at $160 for adult sizes, the Nike Air Max DN was made available in various colorways, including the standout "All Night" version, across Nike.com and its retail channels for both adults and youth.

== Use in basketball ==
In 2024, Nike incorporated Air Max technology into the second generation of its high-performance basketball model, the Nike G.T. Jump 2. Designed for vertical explosiveness and impact protection, the G.T. Jump 2 combines a large-volume Air Max unit in the heel with forefoot Zoom Air cushioning. This hybrid setup enhances responsiveness and provides maximum shock absorption, making it suitable for players who rely on high jumps and quick landings.

== Advertising ==
The line was initially advertised in 1987 with a TV campaign that used the Beatles' song "Revolution", the first time a Beatles song had been used in a TV commercial. Nike used the Just Do It slogan the following year. They were also endorsed by Bo Jackson in exchange for a $100,000 fee, with advertising agency Wieden, Kennedy, and Noah coming up with the slogan "Bo knows...".

Since 2014, March 26 has been declared by Nike as Air Max Day.
