= KBeazy =

American record producer

- Born: Keegan Christopher Bach; April 20, 2001 (age 24); Kalamazoo, Michigan, U.S.
- Origin: Los Angeles, California, U.S.
- Genres: Hip hop; trap; R&B; pop
- Occupations: Record producer; songwriter; YouTuber
- Years active: 2018–present

Keegan Christopher Bach (born April 20, 2001), known professionally as KBeazy (stylized KBeaZy), is an American record producer, songwriter, and YouTuber. He is best known for producing the singles "Mood" for 24kGoldn in 2020, as well as "That's What I Want" for Lil Nas X the following year.

He first gained recognition in 2017 after reproducing the instrumental of Lil Uzi Vert's "XO TOUR Llif3" on YouTube, and thereafter releasing beat tutorials and live streams. Since his rise to fame, KBeazy has most notably produced songs for Juice Wrld, Kehlani, Iann Dior, Roddy Ricch, Lil Nas X, Machine Gun Kelly, Becky G, Katy Perry, and Maroon 5, among others.

== Career ==
At age 19, KBeazy relocated to Los Angeles to pursue his passion for music full time. He signed a joint venture publishing deal with Prescription Songs and Day One Songs in 2019. Frequent collaborators include rappers 24kGoldn, Iann Dior, and The Kid Laroi, as well as fellow record producers Omer Fedi, Blake Slatkin, and Dr. Luke. KBeazy was named the youngest producer ever to secure a Billboard #1 record with "Mood", which topped the chart for 8 non-consecutive weeks and has over 1 billion streams on Spotify. He has been Grammy-nominated for his work with Lil Nas X and Machine Gun Kelly, received the BMI Pop Award twice, and was included in Forbes' 30 Under 30 list in 2023. His productions have earned over 3 billion global streams.

== Notable credits ==
Year	Title	Artist	Role
2025	A Cold Play	The Kid Laroi	Producer
2025	Catch Me if You Can	KSI	Producer
2022	Beat the Odds	Lil Tjay	Production
2022	I'm So Gone	Tate McRae	Production
2022	What's Your Problem?	Tate McRae	Production
2022	Bailé Con Mi Ex	Becky G	Production
2022	Fake Love Don't Last (with Iann Dior)	Machine Gun Kelly	Production
2022	Dark Angel (interlude)	Iann Dior	Production
2022	I Might	Iann Dior	Production
2021	Let You	Iann Dior	Production
2021	Not Enough	Juice Wrld	Production
2021	Go Hard	Juice Wrld	Production
2021	That's What I Want	Lil Nas X	Production
2021	Shots in the Dark (with Trippie Redd)	Iann Dior	Production
2021	Butterflies	24kGoldn	Production
2021	Empty (feat. Swae Lee)	24kGoldn	Production
2021	The Top	24kGoldn	Production
2021	Tired of Me	ssgkobe	Production
2021	Seasons	Maroon 5	Drums, Keyboards, Producer
2020	Mood (feat. Iann Dior)	24kGoldn	Composition, production
2020	Mood (Remix) (feat. Justin Bieber, J Balvin, and Iann Dior)	24kGoldn	Composition, production
2020	Prospect (feat. Lil Baby)	Iann Dior	Composition, production
2020	Toxic	Kehlani	Composition, production
2020	Holding On	Iann Dior	Composition, production
2020	Way Up	Quando Rondo	Composition, production
2020	Baby Blue (feat. Olivia O'Brien)	Dempsey Hope	Production
2020	Dem Times	Roy Woods	Composition, keyboards, production
2019	What I Please (feat. Denzel Curry)	Smokepurpp	Production
2019	Trippin Baby	Fetty Wap	Production
2018	Feed Tha Streets 2 (Intro)	Roddy Ricch	Production
2018	Check Please	Baby Keem	Production
2018	I Need More	Chief Keef	Production

== Collaborators ==
Recent collaborators include: Lunchmoney Lewis, Ryan Ogren, Honest Ave, Theron Thomas, Vaughn, Omer Fedi, Blake Slatkin, 8ae, Oliver, Kyle Stemberger, Dr. Luke, and Joseph Tilley.

== Upcoming Releases ==
Upcoming releases include songs with: Saweetie, Tanner Adell, and ENHYPEN.
