= MSCHF =

American art collective

- Industry: Art and fashion
- Founded: 2016; 10 years ago in New York, United States
- Headquarters: Brooklyn
- Key people: Gabriel Whaley (CEO); Lukas Bentel (CCO); Kevin Wiesner (CCO); Stephen Tetreault (COO)
- Number of employees: c. 30
- Website: mschf.com

MSCHF (pronounced "mischief", operating as MSCHF Product Studio, Inc.) is an American art collective based in Brooklyn, New York, United States. The group has around 30 employees.

Their notable work includes The Persistence of Chaos (2018), a laptop infected with viruses; Satan Shoes (2021), a series of custom Nike shoes which featured Satanic imagery; and Tax Heaven 3000 (2023), a dating simulator which filed the player's taxes.

In August 2025, MSCHF created Applied MSCHF, an advertising agency.

== History ==
The group was founded in 2016 by Gabriel Whaley, who is the chief executive officer, along with chief creative officers Lukas Bentel and Kevin Wiesner, and chief operating officer Stephen Tetreault. The group operates as a company under the name of MSCHF Product Studio, Inc.

As of July 2020, MSCHF had received $11.7 million in funding.

Josh Wardle, the Welsh software engineer who created the web-based word game Wordle, joined MSCHF in December 2021.

In August 2025, MSCHF created an advertising agency, Applied MSCHF. It operates as a division of MSCHF, and it employs around half of MSCHF's approximately 30 employees.

== Releases ==
The group announces the availability of their work in numbered "drops". The below is not an exhaustive listing of all of MSCHF's works.

In May 2019, MSCHF released its first work, The Persistence of Chaos, in collaboration with Guo O Dong. It is a single 2008 Windows laptop loaded with six malware programs. The programs included caused an estimated US$95 billion in damage to the global economy. It sold for $1.34 million.

In October 2019, in a drop titled Jesus Shoes, MSCHF bought a pair of Nike Air Max 97s at their regular price. They attached a shoelace charm of Jesus on a crucifix, and added holy water sourced from the Jordan River to the soles so that the wearer could "walk on water". They sold for $1,425.

A November 2019 release called Puff the Squeaky Chicken consisted of a rubber chicken that was also a functional bong.

In 2020, MSCHF released a dog collar called Cuss Collar. It turns barking into spoken swear words.

In April 2020, for the drop Severed Spots, MSCHF bought a $30,000 Damien Hirst spot print titled L-Isoleucine T-Butyl Ester. They then cut the individual spots out of the print, retitled each one 88 Spots, and sold them for $480 each. A second work consisting of the leftover paper, 88 Holes, sold for $261,400 in an online auction.

In June 2020, MSCHF and MrBeast released a one-time multiplayer mobile game titled Finger on the App. Players touched their phone screen, and the last person to remove their finger from the screen won $25,000. Four people ended up winning $20,000 each after keeping their finger on the app for 70 hours. A sequel titled "Finger on the App 2" was released in March 2021, featuring a grand prize of $100,000. The winner kept their finger on the phone screen for around 51 hours; the second-place finisher received a prize of $20,000.

In September 2020, MSCHF released Medical Bill Art, a series of paintings that were enlargements of medical bills received by American citizens. The paintings were sold for $78,000, and the proceeds were used to pay the bills the work was built upon.

In February 2021, MSCHF purchased a Boston Dynamics robot dog, and mounted a paintball gun on it. It was used in a live performance titled Spot's Rampage that allowed users of the MSCHF app to control the robot and its paintball gun. After MSCHF publicly criticized the potential use of robotic dogs by police forces, Boston Dynamics released a statement criticizing the use of the robot in an artwork. According to the Perrotin gallery, "Boston Dynamics remotely disabled MSCHF’s legally-purchased Spot® robot via an undisclosed backdoor." The artwork was subsequently reworked and titled Spot’s Revenge.

Also in February 2021, MSCHF purchased four Birkin bags and used them to make sandals, dubbed Birkinstocks after the Birkenstock brand of shoes. The shoes sold for between $34,000 and $76,000, depending on the size of shoe purchased.

In March 2021, MSCHF released Axe No 5, a mashup of Axe Body Spray and Chanel No. 5 perfume.

On March 29, 2021, MSCHF partnered with Lil Nas X to release a pair of modified Nike Air Max 97 shoes called Satan Shoes, in an edition of 666. The shoes sold for $1,018, referencing the Bible verse Luke 10:18. They featured a reversed bronze pentagram, an inverted cross and a drop of human blood in their soles. They sold out within the first minutes of being available for sale. The shoes garnered significant controversy, which led Nike to sue MSCHF for trademark infringement and dilution. In Nike's complaint against MSCHF and Lil Nas X, it argued that it had "suffered harm to its goodwill, including among consumers who believe that Nike is endorsing satanism." In April 2021, the two companies came to a settlement, after a U.S. District Court in Brooklyn granted Nike a temporary restraining order against MSCHF. As part of the settlement, MSCHF agreed to accept returns of the Satan Shoes.

In July 2021, MSCHF released Dead Startup Toys. The drop included miniature "toy" versions of the Juicero juicer, the One Laptop Per Child (OLPC) rugged laptop, the Theranos miniLab, the Jibo social robot, and the Coolest Cooler.

In October 2021, MSCHF bought the Andy Warhol drawing "Fairies" for $20,000, and produced 999 high-quality forgeries of it. They then mixed the fakes with the original, and claimed not to know which was the real Warhol. Each of the forgeries, and the lone original, were (re)titled Possibly Real Copy of 'Fairies' by Andy Warhol, and were sold for $250 each. The project was titled Museum of Forgeries.

In December 2021, MSCHF released Tontine, a betting pool based on the tontine. Participants entered $10 into the pot, and then must log in every day or be eliminated. The last person remaining gets the pot. There is currently $71,400 in the prize pool, and as of September 2026, 106 players are left in the game.

In January 2022, MSCHF released OnlyBags. The drop consisted of a website where users could browse and purchase shopping bags from luxury brands. All bags sold out in under a minute.

In February 2023, MSCHF trended on social media after revealing its upcoming drop, the Big Red Boots. It released on February 16, and sold for $350. American professional wrestler Seth Rollins prominently wore them on an episode of WWE's Monday Night RAW, bringing attention to them.

In April 2023, MSCHF released Tax Heaven 3000, a romantic visual novel video game that helped generate information for players' 2022 U.S. tax returns.

In June 2023, MSCHF sold a microscopic Louis Vuitton handbag for over $63,000 through an online auction.

In March 2024, MSCHF bought a cow, Angus, for a drop titled Our Cow Angus. They sold shares of Angus in the form of tokens, representing 1,200 hamburgers and four leather bags. Angus would be killed two years later, unless 50% of shareholders returned their tokens, in which case Angus would not be killed and no hamburgers or bags would ship. Ultimately, Angus survived. Our Cow Angus was controversial and caused divisive debates on social media. Annabel Keenan of The Art Newspaper criticized it for failing to "spark meaningful conversations on animal rights or the food and fashion industries ... [f]or a project that aimed to narrow the gap between buyers and the products they consume, the actual result worsened the distance, flattening intellectual dialogue." In a statement to The Art Newspaper, an associate director of People for the Ethical Treatment of Animals was also critical, saying that "MSCHF [should] stick to animal-free antics for any future attempts to shock the public".

In September 2024, Gufram and MSCHF released a version of the 1971 Pratone seat called Cut Pratone®, a Pratone with its tips "sliced off". It featured grass "clippings" and red "bloodied foam innards". It was exhibited in the Perrotin gallery, alongside other works, including an altered version of Gufram's Cactus coat stand rendered as a cellular base station with multiple 5G antennas.

== Legal issues ==
=== Vans, Inc. v. MSCHF Prod. Studio, Inc. ===
In 2023, MSCHF was issued a preliminary injunction by the Second Court of Appeals by a trademark and trade dress infringement claim by Vans, Inc. for MSCHF's Wavy Baby shoes. 4,306 pairs were sold. MSCHF argued that the use of the wave design was protected by the First Amendment and therefore not infringement. The Second Court of Appeals affirmed the District Court's order for the preliminary injunction.

== Publications ==
- Bentel, Lukas; Wiesner, Kevin; Wong, Karen (2025). Made by MSCHF. London: Phaidon Press. ISBN 978-1-83866-856-3.
