= List of Billboard Digital Song Sales number ones of 2021 =

2021 highest-selling digital singles in the United States

The Billboard Digital Song Sales chart is a chart that ranks the most downloaded songs in the United States. Its data is compiled by Nielsen SoundScan based on each song's weekly digital sales, which combines sales of different versions of a song by an act for a summarized figure.

In 2021, 28 acts reached number one (including features) with 22 songs. Fifteen artists achieved their first number-one digital song: Tom MacDonald, Gabby Barrett, Masked Wolf, Dua Lipa, DaBaby, Bryson Gray, Tyson James, Chandler Crump, Jack Harlow, State of Mine, Drew Jacobs, John Rich, Mike Rowe, Juice Wrld and Suga. The year was dominated by South Korean boy band BTS: they are the only act to have multiple number-one songs (5), one of only two acts to top the chart for multiple weeks, holding the top 10 digital song sales weeks of the year, and topping the chart for a total of 30 weeks. The band's "Dynamite" opened the year atop the chart, spending eight non-consecutive weeks in the lead (following its ten chart-topping weeks in 2020), making it the longest running number-one song in the chart's history, before being replaced by their own "Film Out". "Butter" later topped the chart for 18 non-consecutive weeks, tying the band's own "Dynamite", and accumulating at least 1,699,900 digital downloads.

Justin Bieber's "Anyone" became his 13th number-one song, breaking his tie with Drake for the most number-one songs by a male artist. It was replaced by singer-songwriter Olivia Rodrigo's debut single "Drivers License" which spent three weeks atop the chart, the only song not by BTS to top the chart for multiple weeks. Taylor Swift's "All Too Well (Taylor's Version)", a re-recorded version of her 2012 single "All Too Well", debuted atop the chart, extending her record as the artist with the most number-one songs on the chart, with 23. Following the release of a remix of The Weeknd's "Save Your Tears" with Ariana Grande, the song jumped to the number-one spot, becoming their sixth and eighth number-ones on the chart respectively.

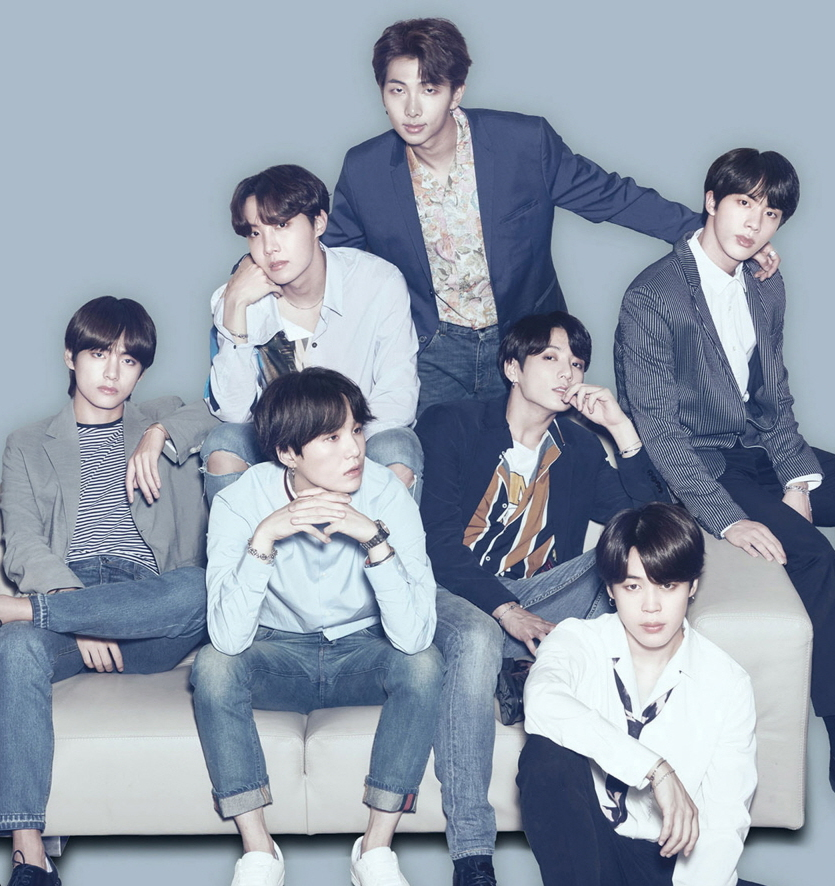
South Korean boy band BTS topped the chart for a total 30 weeks, aided by five songs and four self-replacements at the top spot

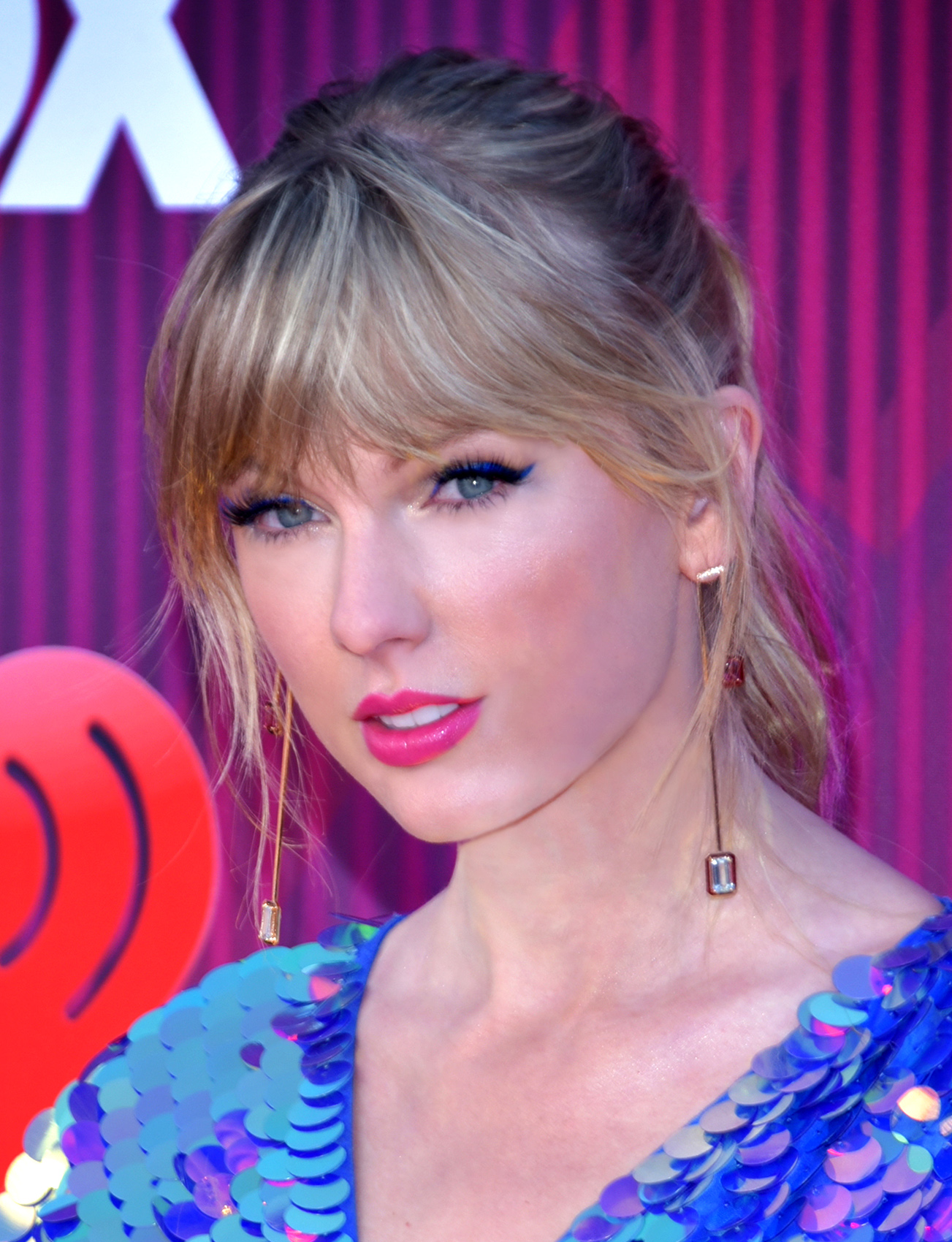
American singer-songwriter Taylor Swift achieved her 23nd chart-topper with "All Too Well (Taylor's Version)", extending her all-time record for the most number-ones for any act

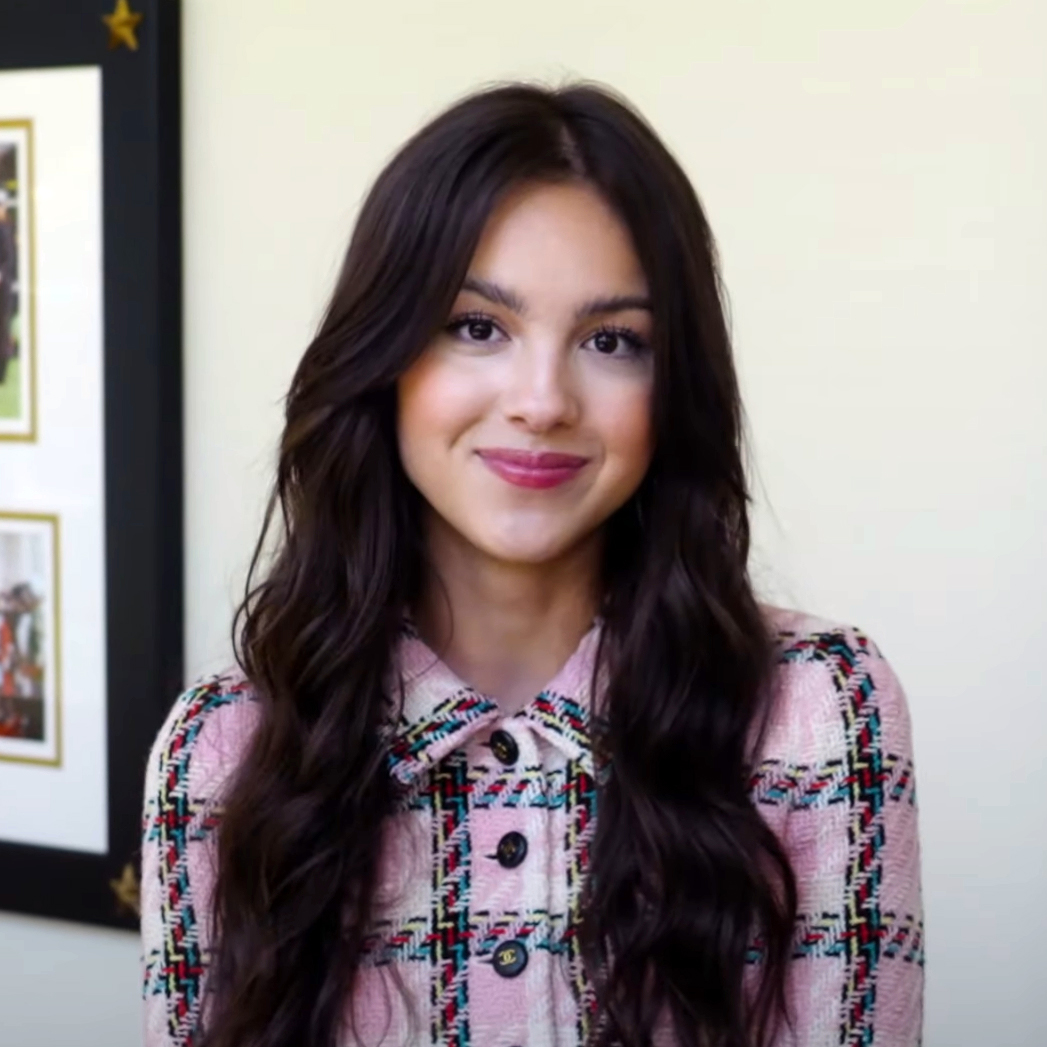
American singer-songwriter Olivia Rodrigo topped the chart for three weeks with her debut single, "Drivers License"

== Chart history ==
Key
†	Indicates best-performing song of 2021

Issue date	Song	Artist(s)	Weekly sales	Ref(s)
January 2	"Dynamite"	BTS	16,000	
January 9	"Dynamite"	BTS	45,000	
January 16	"Anyone"	Justin Bieber	22,000	
January 23	"Drivers License"	Olivia Rodrigo	38,000	
January 30	"Drivers License"	Olivia Rodrigo	27,000	
February 6	"Drivers License"	Olivia Rodrigo	17,000	
February 13	"Fake Woke"	Tom MacDonald	14,000	
February 20	"Up"	Cardi B	34,000	
February 27	"Love Story (Taylor's Version)"	Taylor Swift	25,000	
March 6	"Dynamite"	BTS	14,500	
March 13	"Dynamite"	BTS	24,000	
March 20	"Dynamite"	BTS	27,900	
March 27	"Dynamite"	BTS	26,700	
April 3	"Dynamite"	BTS	43,000	
April 10	"Dynamite"	BTS	37,700	
April 17	"Film Out"	BTS	19,000	
April 24	"Montero (Call Me by Your Name)"	Lil Nas X	19,500	
May 1	"The Good Ones"	Gabby Barrett		
May 8	"Save Your Tears"	The Weeknd and Ariana Grande	18,000	
May 15	"Astronaut in the Ocean"	Masked Wolf	12,500	
May 22	"Levitating"	Dua Lipa featuring DaBaby	19,900	
May 29	"Seeing Green"	Nicki Minaj featuring Drake and Lil Wayne	33,000	
June 5	"Butter" †	BTS	242,800	
June 12	"Butter" †	BTS	140,200	
June 19	"Butter" †	BTS	138,400	
June 26	"Butter" †	BTS	111,400	
July 3	"Butter" †	BTS	128,400	
July 10	"Butter" †	BTS		
July 17	"Butter" †	BTS	108,800	
July 24	"Permission to Dance"	BTS	140,100	
July 31	"Butter" †	BTS	115,600	
August 7	"Butter" †	BTS	112,900	
August 14	"Butter" †	BTS	79,200	
August 21	"Butter" †	BTS	62,900	
August 28	"Butter" †	BTS	55,000	
September 4	"Butter" †	BTS	68,800	
September 11	"Butter" †	BTS	143,000	
September 18	"Butter" †	BTS	84,500	
September 25	"Butter" †	BTS	48,000	
October 2	"Butter" †	BTS	33,500	
October 9	"My Universe"	Coldplay and BTS	127,000	
October 16	"My Universe"	Coldplay and BTS	42,600	
October 23	"Industry Baby"	Lil Nas X featuring Jack Harlow	34,300	
October 30	"Easy on Me"	Adele	74,000	
November 6	"Let's Go Brandon"	Bryson Gray featuring Tyson James and Chandler Crump	48,000	
November 13	"Let's Go Brandon"	Bryson Gray featuring Tyson James and Chandler Crump		
November 20	"Easy on Me"	Adele	14,600	
November 27	"All Too Well (Taylor's Version)"	Taylor Swift	57,800	
December 4	"God's Country"	State Of Mine and Drew Jacobs		
December 11	"Santa's Gotta Dirty Job"	John Rich and Mike Rowe	13,000	
December 18	"Butter" †	BTS	26,500	
December 25	"Girl of My Dreams"	Juice Wrld and Suga	40,000	

== See also ==
- 2021 in American music
- List of Billboard Hot 100 number ones of 2021
- List of number-one Billboard Streaming Songs of 2021
