= Drivers License (song) =

2021 single by Olivia Rodrigo

Single by Olivia Rodrigo

from the album Sour
- Written: 2020
- Released: January 8, 2021
- Recorded: 2020
- Studio: Amusement (Los Angeles)
- Genre: Bedroom pop; alternative pop; indie pop; power pop
- Length: 4:02
- Label: Geffen; Interscope
- Songwriters: Olivia Rodrigo; Dan Nigro
- Producer: Dan Nigro

Olivia Rodrigo singles chronology
"Drivers License" (2021)	"Deja Vu" (2021)

Music video
- "Drivers License" on YouTube

"Drivers License" (stylized in all lowercase) is the debut single by American singer-songwriter Olivia Rodrigo. It was released on January 8, 2021, by Geffen and Interscope Records, as the lead single from her debut studio album Sour. She wrote the song alongside producer Dan Nigro. Containing poignant lyrics detailing heartache, "Drivers License" is a pop power ballad blending bedroom pop, alternative pop, indie pop, and power pop styles. It is characterized by a minimalist, piano-led production, incorporating kick drums, harmonies, syncopated hand-claps, and a dreamy bridge. One of 2021's most successful songs, "Drivers License" launched Rodrigo's music career.

The song documents the "multifaceted" emotions Rodrigo endured after a heartbreak. She teased the song on her social media for many months in 2020, before announcing it on January 4, 2021. The official music video was posted to YouTube alongside the song's release, in which Rodrigo drives around a suburban area after receiving her driver's license and reminisces about her memories of the song's subject, who encouraged her to obtain the license. "Drivers License" was met with widespread critical acclaim; praise centered on Rodrigo's cathartic songwriting, emotional vocals, and the song's stirring production, with many underscoring its Taylor Swift and Lorde influences. The song won Best Pop Solo Performance at the 2022 Grammy Awards, where it was also nominated for Record of the Year and Song of the Year.

"Drivers License" broke a string of records, including the Spotify record for the most single-day streams for a non-holiday song (achieved on its fourth day of release) and the biggest first-week for a song on Spotify and Amazon Music. The song topped the US Billboard Hot 100 and made Rodrigo the youngest artist ever to debut atop the chart. The song spent eight consecutive weeks at number one. It has been certified six-times platinum by the Recording Industry Association of America (RIAA). Elsewhere, "Drivers License" reached number one in 25 countries, as well as spending multiple weeks atop the charts in Australia, Canada, Ireland, New Zealand, and the United Kingdom. It also peaked within the top ten in Brazil, France, Germany, Italy, Spain, South Africa and various others. As of November 2026, the song has over 3.0 billion streams on Spotify, ranking amongst the 100 most streamed songs on the platform.

In 2024, it was listed in Rolling Stone's 500 Greatest Songs of All Time list at 377.

== Background and release ==
While American singer-songwriter Olivia Rodrigo starred in the 2019 Disney+ mockumentary series High School Musical: The Musical: The Series, she contributed a self-written song called "All I Want" to the soundtrack, which was certified Gold by the Recording Industry Association of America (RIAA), for earning over 500,000 units in the United States. The series was renewed for a second season in 2021. Rodrigo signed to Geffen Records, a subsidiary of Interscope Records, intending to release her debut EP in 2021.

When I came up with 'Drivers License', I was going through a heartbreak that was so confusing to me, so multifaceted. Putting all those feelings into a song made everything seem so much simpler and clearer—and at the end of the day, I think that's the whole purpose of songwriting. There’s nothing like sitting at the piano in my bedroom and writing a really sad song. It’s truly my favorite thing in the world.

— Rodrigo on the origins of "Drivers License", Uproxx

She teased the song for many months in 2020, including some lyrics on Instagram. She posted a snippet, captioned "Wrote dis the other day. vv close to my heart. gonna call it drivers license I think lol", where she plays the song on a piano. The song was announced on January 4. The song was released to all digital music and streaming platforms four days later, alongside a music video on YouTube. It is the lead single to her debut studio album Sour, which Rodrigo had originally planned to be an EP. "Drivers License" impacted US contemporary hit radio on January 19.

== Composition and lyrics ==
"Drivers License" (2021)
A 24-second sample of the bridge in "Drivers License", which critics deemed the highlight of the song. It consists of Rodrigo's layered vocals over syncopated drum beats.

Steered by piano, "Drivers License" is an atmospheric pop power ballad that has been described as a bedroom pop, alt-pop, indie pop, and power pop song, with elements of folk and indie rock. It was inspired by the disorienting emotions Rodrigo felt after a recent breakup. She wrote the song with its producer, Daniel Nigro. The song is written in the key of B♭ major and has a fast tempo of 144 beats per minute, with double time kick drum and claps on the second verse and lead-in. Rodrigo's vocal range on the song spans from the low note of G_{3} to the high note of F_{5}. Lyrically, the song has Rodrigo drive through a suburban area, upset and angry, pondering whether any of the subject's feelings were ever true. The lyrics make prevalent use of personal deixis, with 74% of the song being personal pronouns, to further emphasize Rodrigo's intimate thoughts on the heartbreak.

The song begins with the sound of Rodrigo's mother's car engine starting, followed by a "door ajar" chime that fades into a pulsing piano key. Rodrigo delivers soprano vocals that grow into "cathartic howls of pain" as the song progresses, along with a swelling crescendo followed by an emotional chorus. The minimalist instrumentation also consists of syncopated hand-claps and stomping harmonies, and reaches its peak in a rich bridge of layered vocals with the catchphrase "I still fuckin' love you". As stated by Rodrigo, the song has Lorde and Taylor Swift influences, which was also noted by critics. Rodrigo also stated that the EP Minor (2020) by American singer-songwriter Gracie Abrams inspired the musical style of "Drivers License".

In an interview with Vogue magazine, Rodrigo acknowledged the song had grammatical errors, including the lack of an apostrophe ("Drivers License" vs "Driver's License") and the contradictory double negative: "I've never felt this way for no one".

== Critical reception ==
"Drivers License" received critical acclaim upon its release. Spencer Kornhaber of The Atlantic called it "The Breakout Pop Song of the Year". Clash critic Robin Murray dubbed the song a "sensational pop statement, an impeccable melodic moment right from the off". He praised its firm songwriting and atmospheric production. Matthew Kent, writing for The Line of Best Fit, complimented the song's euphoric sound and poignant lyricism, and asserted that the single is packed with "emotional punch after emotional punch". They dubbed the song a "stunning" and "stirring" debut single. Kelsie Gibson of PopSugar opined that the song gives off "major Lorde and Taylor Swift" influences, who are two of Rodrigo's musical inspirations. Stereogum critic Chris DeVille described "Drivers License" as a cinematic and old-fashioned power ballad, a "prime Spotify-core sadgirl fare" that starts "as a trembling Phoebe Bridgers song" and concludes as a "resplendent Folklore track".

Listing it amongst best new music, Teen Vogue's Claire Dodson commented that Rodrigo employs soaring vocals, and capture "small details" in the song. Dodson thought the song channels "the songwriting prowess she already brings to the table". Naming it one of the "10 Cool New Pop Songs to Get You Through The Week", Billboard writers Gab Linsberg and Jason Lipshutz branded "Drivers License" the type of debut single "that aspiring artists dream of", where Rodrigo perfects her heartbreak's "fragility and heightened emotion". They commended the singer's range in the song, swinging between the crescendo's "stomp-clap harmonies" and the bridge's "choked-up balladry". Ellise Shafer of Variety found the song relatable and vulnerable, and complimented its production and vocal performance. Shafer noted it as "a must-hear for any pop enthusiast".

Calling the song an "early contender for song of the year", Rolling Stone critic Brittany Spanos noted that the production of "Drivers License" is reminiscent of Lorde's Melodrama (2017), while the lyrics and "detailed" storytelling channel Swift's Fearless (2008). Spanos lauded Rodrigo's songwriting skills and emotional potency at age 17, and added that "she could likely become pop's next great raconteur". Justin Curto of Vulture opined that "Drivers License" mixes "the intimate arrangements of Folklore and Evermore with the high stakes pop of Lover, tying it all together with a dramatic, Swiftian bridge". He also added that Rodrigo's calm vocals sound like Billie Eilish, while her anthemic moments recall Lorde, with hints of Alessia Cara. Jared Richards of Junkee stated that the song has "an irreducible quality, capturing a very specific heartbreak", blending "the slow-build piano-belters and bridge breakdowns of Lorde's Melodrama with Swiftian songwriting", and regarded it 2021's "Big Pop Moment".

In May 2021, Billboard ranked "Drivers License" third on their ranking of the "100 Greatest Song Bridges of the 21st Century", and in June 2021, they ranked the song as the best song of 2021 so far, with Rania Aniftos calling the song "the start of Rodrigo's reign as pop's most captivating new storyteller".

Insider Inc. named "Drivers License" as "the year's defining hit". Associated Press placed it on their "Top Songs of 2021" list: "Anyone who's ever had their heart broken will feel how 18-year-old Olivia Rodrigo feels on this aching Grammy-nominated hit." Marie Claire placed it on their "The 16 Best Sad Songs of 2021 to Play When You're Feeling Down" list. Vogue Scandinavia placed it on their "12 best songs of 2021" list: "Capturing the essence of an entire generation's perception of youth, anxiety, and teen love — all in a blue and purple tint — Ms Rodrigo set herself on the map as one of the 21st century's most prolific songwriters and storytellers." Digg ranked it at number 10 based on their compilation of 2021 Top 10 best songs lists from different websites and magazines. In 2024, "Drivers License" was placed number 377 in Rolling Stone's "500 Greatest Songs of All Time" list, and number 14 in Billboard's list of "75 Best Breakup Songs of All Time".

== Accolades ==
Awards and nominations
Year	Organization	Award	Result	Ref(s)
2021	American Music Awards	Favorite Trending Song	Nominated	
2021	American Music Awards	Favorite Music Video	Nominated	
2021	American Music Awards	Favorite Pop Song	Nominated	
2021	Apple Music Awards	Song of the Year	Won	
2022	APRA Music Awards	Most Performed International Work	Nominated	
2021	Asia Pop 40	Top Asia Pop 40 Song of the Year	Won	
2022	Grammy Awards	Record of the Year	Nominated	
2022	Grammy Awards	Song of the Year	Nominated	
2022	Grammy Awards	Best Pop Solo Performance	Won	
2022	Joox Malaysia Music Awards	Top 5 International Songs	Won	
2021	LOS40 Music Awards	Best International Song	Nominated	
2021	MTV Europe Music Awards	Best Song	Nominated	
2021	MTV Millennial Awards	Global Hit of the Year	Nominated	
2021	MTV Video Music Awards	Song of the Year	Won	
2021	MTV Video Music Awards	Push Performance of the Year	Won	
2021	Premios MUSA	International Anglo Song	Nominated	
2021	Premios Odeón	Foreign Song of the Year	Nominated	
2021	Rockbjörnen	Foreign Song of the Year	Nominated	
2021	RTHK International Pop Poll Awards	Top Ten International Gold Songs	Won	

== Commercial performance ==
"Drivers License" was met with widespread commercial success worldwide, with publications calling it the year's biggest hit in early 2021. Upon release, the song reached number one on international Spotify, Apple Music and Amazon Music songs charts. Billboard reported that, in its first three days in the US, the song sold over 16,000 digital downloads and received more than 21 million streams. Compared to its release day, the song's total streams increased by 122% on its second day, and rose another 32% in its third day.

The song broke the Spotify record for most one-day streams for a non-holiday song, with over 15 million global streams on its fourth day (January 11, 2021). The next day, it extended its record with over 17 million streams. It also broke the record for fastest song to reach 100 million streams on Spotify. "Drivers License" went on to break the Spotify record for most streams of a song in a single week, with over 65 million streams in the week ending January 14, 2021. It also broke the record for the biggest global first-week streams for a song in Amazon Music history, and became the most requested song of a single day on Alexa.

"Drivers License" also reached number one on both Billboard Global and Billboard Global Excl. U.S. charts, generating 130 million streams and 49,000 sales with the former, and 54.5 million streams and 12,000 sales on the latter. It marked the highest weekly streaming total in the world for a song by a female artist, with 130.06 million streams, surpassing the 130.042 million sum for Mariah Carey's "All I Want for Christmas Is You". The song topped both the global charts for three consecutive weeks, becoming the first song by a female artist to do so ever since the charts' inauguration, and the second overall after "Dákiti" (2020) by Bad Bunny and Jhay Cortez. It stayed atop both the charts for eight consecutive weeks.

=== United States ===
"Drivers License" debuted atop the Billboard Hot 100, giving Rodrigo her first number-one single in the United States, and making her the first female artist since Carrie Underwood to have their first single debut at number-one on the chart. It marked her second entry on the chart, after "All I Want". It collected 76.1 million streams, 38,000 digital downloads, and 8.1 million airplay impressions in its opening week. Surpassing Jawsh 685, who topped the chart with "Savage Love (Laxed - Siren Beat)" (2020), Rodrigo became the most-recently-born artist to top the Hot 100, and the youngest since Billie Eilish, who achieved it with "Bad Guy" (2019), and is the youngest artist ever to debut atop the Hot 100. "Drivers License" topped the Billboard Streaming Songs and Digital Song Sales charts as well, staying atop both for three consecutive weeks. Billboard noted the song as one of the most dominant number-one hits of all time, garnering more than double the Hot 100 units of its closest competitor, "Mood" (2020). "Drivers License" spent eight consecutive weeks atop the Hot 100; it became the seventh single in the chart's history to have debuted at number one and spend at least its first eight weeks at the spot.

As of July 2021, "Drivers License" was the most streamed song of 2021 so far, with 582.8 million on-demand streams. It is also the most streamed audio track (460.2 million), the most watched video (122.6 million views), the sixth best-selling digital song (199,000 downloads), and the eighth biggest song across all formats of radio (1.227 billion audience impressions). As of June 2023, "Drivers License" has been certified 6× Platinum in the US by the RIAA with 6,000,000 units.

=== Other markets ===
In the United Kingdom, "Drivers License" debuted at the top of the UK Singles Chart dated January 21, 2021, earning 2.407 million total streams on January 12, 2021, alone. The song broke the record for highest single-day streams in British history for a non-Christmas song, surpassing the previous record held by Ed Sheeran's "Shape of You" (2017). With 95,000 units moved in its first week, "Drivers License" also had the biggest opening week for a number one debut single on the UK Singles Chart since Zayn Malik's "Pillowtalk" (2016). "Drivers License" spent nine weeks at the top of the UK Singles Chart, becoming the longest run at the top for a solo female artist since Tones and I' s "Dance Monkey" spent eleven consecutive weeks at the top in 2019. Spurred by "Drivers License", "All I Want" reached number 32, marking her second top-40 entry in the UK.

In Ireland, "Drivers License" debuted at the top of the Irish Singles Chart. It was the country's most downloaded and streamed song its first two weeks, outperforming the rest of the top five combined. It remained at number one for nine consecutive weeks; "All I Want" charted simultaneously, reaching a new peak of number 16.

In Australia, "Drivers License" debuted at the top of the ARIA Singles Chart dated January 24, 2021, scoring Rodrigo her first number one song in Australia. In doing so, the song became the first debut single to top the ARIA Singles Chart since Harry Styles' "Sign of the Times" in 2017. "Drivers License" spent six consecutive weeks atop the chart.

== Music video ==
A still from the music video, in which Rodrigo drives a car through a suburban neighborhood at night

The video, directed by Matthew Dillon Cohen, adopts a vignette aesthetic and depicts Rodrigo's healing from heartbreak. She receives her driver's license in the video, but instead of going to her old lover's house like she used to dream of, she finds herself aimlessly cruising suburban side streets. Rodrigo reminisces about moments from her brief relationship. At the beginning of the video, she is embraced by the happy memories only, but eventually, all the toxic traits of her ex-partner confront her. The video received positive comments from critics for its visuals.

The music video was filmed in Provo, Utah.

== Impact and legacy ==
When we were talking about the audience that [Rodrigo] had prior to the release—that's a very young, female, engaged audience. So they really sort of sparked the flame. But now what you have is it traveling well beyond that audience. And obviously social media platforms have helped that, but I think just word of mouth. This is a song you're talking about with everyone right now. Everyone's listening to it, everyone's obsessing over it.

— Spotify on the viral success of "Drivers License", Billboard

"Drivers License" has been credited with launching Rodrigo's music career. The instant commercial success of the song upon its release has been attributed to the rise of niche market for bedroom pop, the song's emotional lyricism and appeal, TikTok, the tabloid journalism and social media speculation surrounding the song, and Rodrigo's Disney career. The Indian Express opined that song is a part of the DIY movement in the music industry, where young artists (mostly post-millennials), such as Rodrigo, Billie Eilish, and Tate McRae, are capable of making music of "near-studio quality" without leaving the house. Commenting on the song's unprecedented success, Spotify's Becky Bass stated that "We've never seen anything like this, where you do have a newer artist that just comes out of the gate in such a dominant way, and just continues to grow".

Paper remarked that the song is a "product of years of pop trends" that resonates with millions of listeners, similar to the rise of Eilish in 2019, Lorde in 2013, or Taylor Swift in the late 2000s, but occurred instantly in Rodrigo's case, because of recent technological innovations like TikTok that has altered the course of the music industry. The TikTok hashtag "#driverslicense" amassed over 888.5 million views in one week. Paper also highlighted consumers' interest in the song's romantic background (a phenomenon of listeners being invested in the drama between Disney co-stars) as a factor for the song's success. The New York Times writer Joe Coscarelli wrote that the song was spurred not only by its quality, but also the gossips surrounding it, paired with the label's marketing plan, and support from celebrities like Swift. He noted the autobiographical song bolstered tabloids and listeners to "piece together its real-life parallels", while TikTok videos led to social media posts, "which led to streams, which led to news articles, and back around again", generating an "unbeatable" feedback loop. Coscarelli added that, similar to Britney Spears, Justin Timberlake, Christina Aguilera, Miley Cyrus, Demi Lovato, and Selena Gomez, Rodrigo took "her experiences within the Disney machine and attempted to translate them for a broader, more adult audience".

Stereogum's Chris DeVille found Rodrigo to be an example of "actor-turned-pop stars" who profit off their best-known roles, such as her Bizaardvark and High School Musical: The Musical: The Series, which "created a massive built-in audience for a prospective Rodrigo music career"; "Drivers License" maximized this interest by referencing the "behind-the-scenes drama" involving Joshua Bassett, who co-stars with Rodrigo in High School Musical: The Musical: The Series, and Sabrina Carpenter. DeVille added that the song "will have ripple effects" that affect the industry in 2021 and beyond, as its bedroom pop sound is challenging hip-hop's dominance on streaming platforms. Douglas Greenwood, writing for I-D, asserted that "Drivers License" contains "all of the old-school ingredients of a hit".

Insider dubbed the song an "early 2021 cultural touchstone", citing its "sad girl appeal" echoing Generation Z (similar to Lorde and Eilish), the celebrity romance associated with its lyrics (like that of Swift), the song's cinematic bridge, its TikTok popularity, and radio friendliness as contributing factors to the song's success. Music journalist Laura Snapes, writing for The Guardian, wrote "Drivers License" is the "epitome of new-school pop songwriting", in which power ballads are sonically intimate and subdued, rather than bombastic, with lyrics delving into specific and complex emotions. On Rodrigo's 18th birthday, the February 20, 2021 episode of Saturday Night Live included a skit in which English actor Regé-Jean Page and six other male cast members recited the song's lyrics. Responding to the tabloid speculation around the song's subjects, Rodrigo stated: "I put it out not knowing that it would get that reaction, so it was really strange [when] it did. I just remember [everyone being] so weird and speculative about stuff they had no idea about. I don't really subscribe to hating other women because of boys. I think that's so stupid, and I really resent that narrative that was being tossed around."

== Usage in media ==
- "Drivers License" was featured as the main music for Google's Year in Search commercial for 2021.
- "Drivers License" was the theme song of the Japanese drama In Love with Itaike.
- "Drivers License" is featured on the main track list of Just Dance 2023 Edition.
- A large portion of the song was used in the first episode of the second season of Amazon Prime Video's series, The Summer I Turned Pretty (2023).
- Rodrigo performed the song on January 30, 2025 at Intuit Dome in Inglewood, California for FireAid to help with relief efforts for the January 2025 Southern California wildfires.

== Track listing ==
CD single

1. "Drivers License" – 4:04
2. "Drivers License" (radio edit) – 3:48
3. "Drivers License" (instrumental) – 4:02

== Credits and personnel ==
Credits adapted from the liner notes of Sour.

Studio locations

- Recorded at Amusement Studios (Los Angeles)
- Mixed at SOTA Studios (Los Angeles)
- Mastered at Sterling Sound (New York)

Personnel

- Olivia Rodrigo – vocals, backing vocals, songwriting
- Daniel Nigro – songwriting, production, recording, piano, bass, percussion, drum programming, synthesizer, backing vocals
- Dan Viafore – assistant engineering
- Mitch McCarthy – mixing
- Randy Merrill – mastering

== Charts ==
=== Weekly charts ===
Weekly chart performance
Chart (2021–2022)	Peak position
Argentina Hot 100 (Billboard)	54
Australia (ARIA)	1
Austria (Ö3 Austria Top 40)	1
Belgium (Ultratop 50 Flanders)	1
Belgium (Ultratop 50 Wallonia)	4
Bolivia (Monitor Latino)	8
Canada Hot 100 (Billboard)	1
Canada CHR/Top 40 (Billboard)	1
Canada Hot AC (Billboard)	2
CIS Airplay (TopHit)	116
Colombia (National-Report)	41
Costa Rica (Monitor Latino)	15
Czech Republic Singles Digital (ČNS IFPI)	1
Denmark (Tracklisten)	1
El Salvador (Monitor Latino)	12
Finland (Suomen virallinen lista)	1
France (SNEP)	2
Germany (GfK)	2
Global 200 (Billboard)	1
Greece (IFPI)	1
Hungary (Rádiós Top 40)	5
Hungary (Single Top 40)	5
Hungary (Stream Top 40)	1
Iceland (Tónlistinn)	3
India International Singles (IMI)	19
Indonesia (Prambors)	1
Ireland (IRMA)	1
Israel (Media Forest)	1
Italy (FIMI)	8
Italy Airplay (EarOne)	24
Japan (Japan Hot 100)	94
Latvia (EHR)	1
Lithuania (AGATA)	1
Malaysia (RIM)	1
Mexico Top 20 General (Monitor Latino)	9
Netherlands (Dutch Top 40)	1
Netherlands (Single Top 100)	1
New Zealand (Recorded Music NZ)	1
Norway (VG-lista)	1
Philippines Hot 100 (Billboard Philippines)	73
Poland Airplay (ZPAV)	44
Portugal (AFP)	1
Puerto Rico (Monitor Latino)	14
Romania (Airplay 100)	55
Singapore (RIAS)	1
San Marino (SMRRTV Top 50)	46
Slovakia (Singles Digitál Top 100)	1
Slovakia Airplay (ČNS IFPI)	5
South Africa (RISA)	1
South Korea (Gaon)	128
Spain (PROMUSICAE)	4
Sweden (Sverigetopplistan)	1
Switzerland (Schweizer Hitparade)	2
UK Singles (Official Charts)	1
Uruguay (Monitor Latino)	16
US Billboard Hot 100	1
US Adult Contemporary (Billboard)	9
US Adult Pop Airplay (Billboard)	1
US Dance Airplay (Billboard)	4
US Pop Airplay (Billboard)	1
US Rhythmic Airplay (Billboard)	30
Venezuela (Record Report)	40
Vietnam Hot 100 (Billboard)	79

=== Monthly charts ===
Monthly chart performance
Chart (2021)	Peak position
Brazil (Pro-Música Brasil)	39
Czech Republic (Singles Digitál Top 100)	2
Slovakia (Singles Digitál Top 100)	1

=== Year-end charts ===
2021 year-end chart performance
Chart (2021)	Position
Australia (ARIA)	3
Austria (Ö3 Austria Top 40)	16
Belgium (Ultratop Flanders)	9
Belgium (Ultratop Wallonia)	25
Bolivia (Monitor Latino)	53
Brazil Streaming (Pro-Música Brasil)	88
Canada (Canadian Hot 100)	6
Chile (Monitor Latino)	28
Costa Rica (Monitor Latino)	64
Denmark (Tracklisten)	11
El Salvador (Monitor Latino)	62
France (SNEP)	74
Germany (Official German Charts)	26
Global 200 (Billboard)	4
Hungary (Rádiós Top 40)	43
Hungary (Stream Top 40)	28
Ireland (IRMA)	2
Italy (FIMI)	98
Mexico (AMPROFON)	5
Netherlands (Dutch Top 40)	33
Netherlands (Single Top 100)	14
New Zealand (Recorded Music NZ)	3
Norway (VG-lista)	6
Portugal (AFP)	4
Puerto Rico (Monitor Latino)	24
Spain (PROMUSICAE)	54
Sweden (Sverigetopplistan)	14
Switzerland (Schweizer Hitparade)	25
UK Singles (OCC)	3
Uruguay (Monitor Latino)	42
US Billboard Hot 100	8
US Adult Contemporary (Billboard)	18
US Adult Top 40 (Billboard)	11
US Mainstream Top 40 (Billboard)	13

2022 year-end chart performance
Chart (2022)	Position
Australia (ARIA)	59
Global 200 (Billboard)	60
Hungary (Rádiós Top 40)	30

2023 year-end chart performance
Chart (2023)	Position
Hungary (Rádiós Top 40)	73

== Certifications ==
Certifications
Region	Certification	Certified units/sales
Australia (ARIA)	11× Platinum	770,000^{‡}
Austria (IFPI Austria)	4× Platinum	120,000^{‡}
Belgium (BRMA)	Platinum	40,000^{‡}
Brazil (Pro-Música Brasil)	3× Diamond	480,000^{‡}
Canada (Music Canada)	9× Platinum	720,000^{‡}
Denmark (IFPI Danmark)	2× Platinum	180,000^{‡}
France (SNEP)	Diamond	333,333^{‡}
Germany (BVMI)	Platinum	400,000^{‡}
Ireland	—	111,000
Italy (FIMI)	Platinum	70,000^{‡}
Mexico (AMPROFON)	Diamond+4× Platinum	1,260,000^{‡}
New Zealand (RMNZ)	6× Platinum	180,000^{‡}
Norway (IFPI Norway)	4× Platinum	240,000^{‡}
Poland (ZPAV)	3× Platinum	150,000^{‡}
Portugal (AFP)	4× Platinum	40,000^{‡}
Spain (Promusicae)	3× Platinum	180,000^{‡}
Switzerland (IFPI Switzerland)	Platinum	20,000^{‡}
United Kingdom (BPI)	4× Platinum	2,400,000^{‡}
United States (RIAA)	6× Platinum	6,000,000^{‡}
Streaming
Central America (CFC)	Platinum	7,000,000^{†}
Greece (IFPI Greece)	Platinum	2,000,000^{†}
Sweden (GLF)	2× Platinum	16,000,000^{†}
^{‡} Sales+streaming figures based on certification alone.^{†} Streaming-only figures based on certification alone.

== Release history ==
Release dates and formats
Region	Date	Format(s)	Label	Ref.
Various	January 8, 2021	Digital download; streaming	Geffen	
Italy	January 15, 2021	Radio airplay	Universal	
United States	January 19, 2021	Contemporary hit radio	Interscope	
DACH	April 1, 2021	CD single	Geffen	

== David Byrne version ==
"Drivers License"

Single by David Byrne
- B-side: "Burning Down the House"
- Released: January 8, 2026
- Length: 3:26
- Label: Geffen
- Songwriters: Olivia Rodrigo; Dan Nigro
- Producer: Ray Suen

David Byrne singles chronology
"T Shirt" (2025)	"Drivers License" (2026)

Official audio
- "Drivers License" on YouTube

On January 8, 2026, exactly five years after the release of "Drivers License", Rodrigo announced that a series of covers of Sour tracks by various artists would be released that year in commemoration of the album's fifth anniversary. Alongside the announcement, the first of the covers, former Talking Heads frontman David Byrne's rendition of "Drivers License", was released on streaming services.

That same day, it was also announced that the cover would appear on a 7" vinyl available on Rodrigo's website, with Rodrigo and Byrne's 2025 live performance of the Talking Heads song "Burning Down the House" serving as the single's B-side.

=== Personnel ===
Credits adapted from the cover's Tidal release.

- David Byrne – vocals
- Ray Suen – acoustic guitar, background vocals, bass guitar, violin, production, recording arrangement
- Dan Nigro – background vocals, songwriting
- Olivia Rodrigo – songwriting
- Hannah Straney – background vocals, vocal arrangement
- Jordan Dodson – background vocals
- Sasha Rivero – background vocals
- Sean Donovan – background vocals
- Tendayi Kuumba – background vocals
- Yuri Yamashita – Caixa, cymbals, tambourine
- Kely Pinheiro – cello
- Stephane San Juan – drums
- Tim Keiper – drums
- Daniel Mintseris – keyboards, recording arrangement
- Bob DeMaa – mastering
- Emily Lazar – mastering
- Mauro Refosco – recording arrangement

== Other versions ==
Various other musicians have performed covers of the song, such as Michael Bublé and Lewis Capaldi in 2022, Rick Astley in 2024, and Lea Michele in 2025.

== See also ==
- List of most-streamed songs on Spotify
- List of Billboard Global 200 number ones of 2021
- List of Billboard Hot 100 chart achievements and milestones
- List of highest-certified singles in Australia
- List of number-one singles of 2021 (Australia)
- List of top 10 singles for 2021 in Australia
- List of number-one hits of 2021 (Austria)
- List of Ultratop 50 number-one singles of 2021
- List of Canadian Hot 100 number-one singles of 2021
- List of number-one hits of 2021 (Denmark)
- List of number-one singles of 2021 (Finland)
- List of number-one singles of 2021 (Ireland)
- List of top 10 singles in 2021 (Ireland)
- List of number-one songs of 2021 (Malaysia)
- List of Dutch Top 40 number-one singles of 2021
- List of number-one singles from the 2020s (New Zealand)
- List of number-one songs in Norway
- List of number-one singles of 2021 (Portugal)
- List of number-one songs of 2021 (Singapore)
- List of number-one singles of the 2020s (Sweden)
- List of UK Singles Chart number ones of the 2020s
- List of UK top-ten singles in 2021
- List of UK Singles Downloads Chart number ones of the 2020s
- List of Billboard Hot 100 number ones of 2021
- List of Billboard Hot 100 number-one singles of the 2020s
- List of Billboard Hot 100 top-ten singles in 2021
- List of Billboard Adult Top 40 number-one songs of the 2020s
- List of Billboard Digital Song Sales number ones of 2021
- List of Radio Songs number ones of the 2020s
- List of Billboard Streaming Songs number ones of 2021
- List of Rolling Stone Top 100 number-one songs of 2021
