= List of number-one albums of 2021 (Portugal) =

The Portuguese Albums Chart ranks the best-performing albums in Portugal, as compiled by the Associação Fonográfica Portuguesa.

Number-one albums in Portugal
← 2020 • 2021 • 2022 →

Week	Album	Artist	Reference
1/2021	Oitenta	Carlos do Carmo	
2/2021	Oitenta	Carlos do Carmo	
3/2021	Nobody Is Listening	Zayn	
4/2021	Fine Line	Harry Styles	
5/2021	Harry Styles	Harry Styles	
6/2021	Medicine at Midnight	Foo Fighters	
7/2021	Medicine at Midnight	Foo Fighters	
8/2021	Be	BTS	
9/2021	Hermitage	Moonspell	
10/2021	Hermitage	Moonspell	
11/2021	Hermitage	Moonspell	
12/2021	Chemtrails over the Country Club	Lana Del Rey	
13/2021	Future Nostalgia	Dua Lipa	
14/2021	Chemtrails over the Country Club	Lana Del Rey	
15/2021	Aurora	Gisela João	
16/2021	E Ainda...	Carlos do Carmo	
17/2021	Voz e Violão	António Zambujo	
18/2021	E Ainda...	Carlos do Carmo	
19/2021	Voz e Violão	António Zambujo	
20/2021	20 Anos – Ana Laíns e Convidados ao Vivo no Casino Estoril	Ana Laíns	
21/2021	Sour	Olivia Rodrigo	
22/2021	BPM	Salvador Sobral	
23/2021	BPM	Salvador Sobral	
24/2021	Sour	Olivia Rodrigo	
25/2021	Carnage	Nick Cave and Warren Ellis	
26/2021	Sour	Olivia Rodrigo	
27/2021	Sour	Olivia Rodrigo	
28/2021	Sour	Olivia Rodrigo	
29/2021	Sob Rock	John Mayer	
30/2021	Sour	Olivia Rodrigo	
31/2021	Happier Than Ever	Billie Eilish	
32/2021	Happier Than Ever	Billie Eilish	
33/2021	Happier Than Ever	Billie Eilish	
34/2021	Sour	Olivia Rodrigo	
35/2021	Happier Than Ever	Billie Eilish	
36/2021	Senjutsu	Iron Maiden	
37/2021	Metallica	Metallica	
38/2021	Senjutsu	Iron Maiden	
39/2021	Senjutsu	Iron Maiden	
40/2021	Metallica	Metallica	
41/2021	The Dark Side of the Moon	Pink Floyd	
42/2021	Music of the Spheres	Coldplay	
43/2021	B-Sides & Rarities: Part I	Nick Cave and the Bad Seeds	
44/2021	=	Ed Sheeran	
45/2021	Voyage	ABBA	
46/2021	Voyage	ABBA	
47/2021	30	Adele	
48/2021	Recomeçar	Tony Carreira	
49/2021	A Minha História	Sara Carreira	
50/2021	Recomeçar	Tony Carreira	
51/2021	Recomeçar	Tony Carreira	
52/2021	Recomeçar	Tony Carreira	

== See also ==
- List of number-one singles of 2021 (Portugal)
