= List of Canadian Hot 100 number-one singles of 2021 =

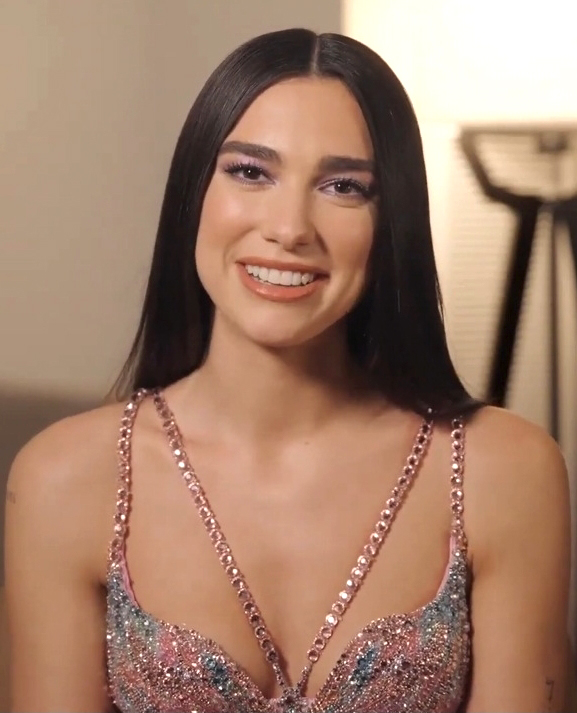
Dua Lipa (pictured) earned her first number-one song with "Levitating", featuring DaBaby, which later ranked as the best-performing song of the year.

This is a list of the Canadian Hot 100 number-one songs of 2021. The Canadian Hot 100 is a chart that ranks the best-performing songs of Canada. Its data, published by Billboard magazine and compiled by MRC Data, is based collectively on each song's weekly physical and digital sales, as well as airplay and streaming.

== Chart history ==
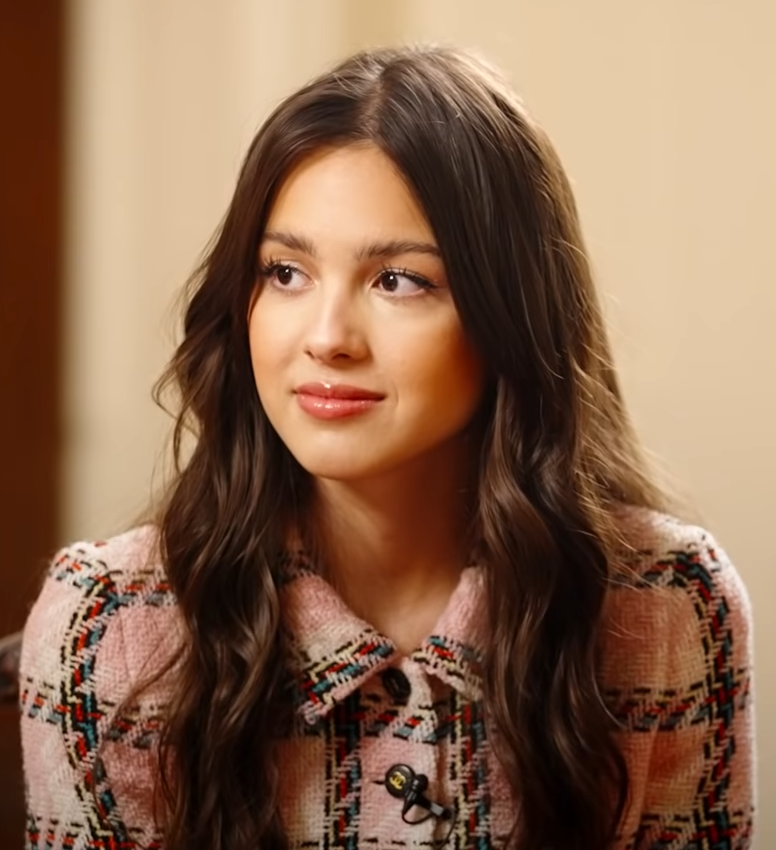
Olivia Rodrigo (pictured) scored two number-one songs that both debuted at the top spot, "Drivers License" and "Good 4 U".

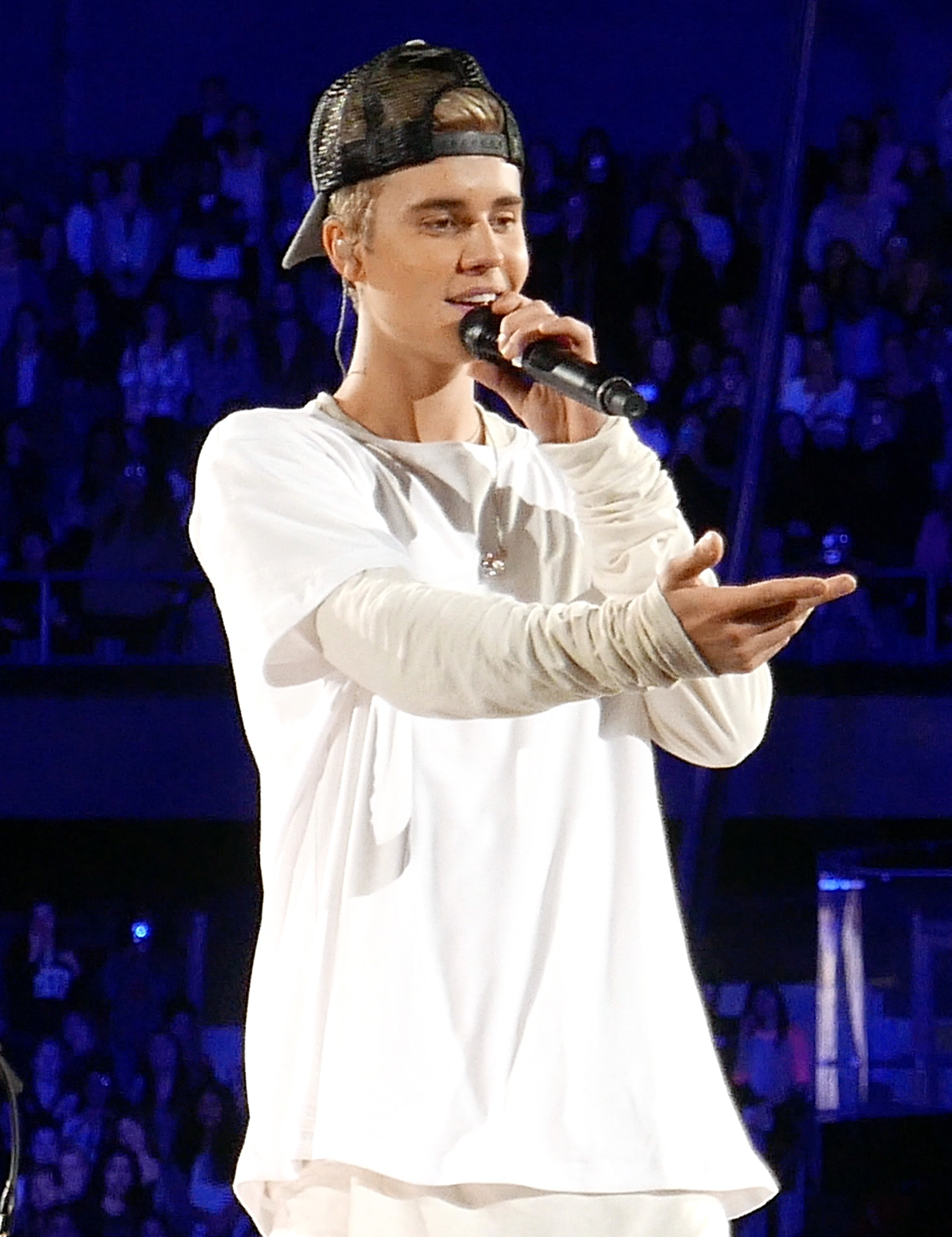
Justin Bieber (pictured) became the act with the most Canadian Hot 100 number-one songs since the chart's inception in 2007, with thirteen, aided by "Peaches" and the Kid Laroi collaboration "Stay".

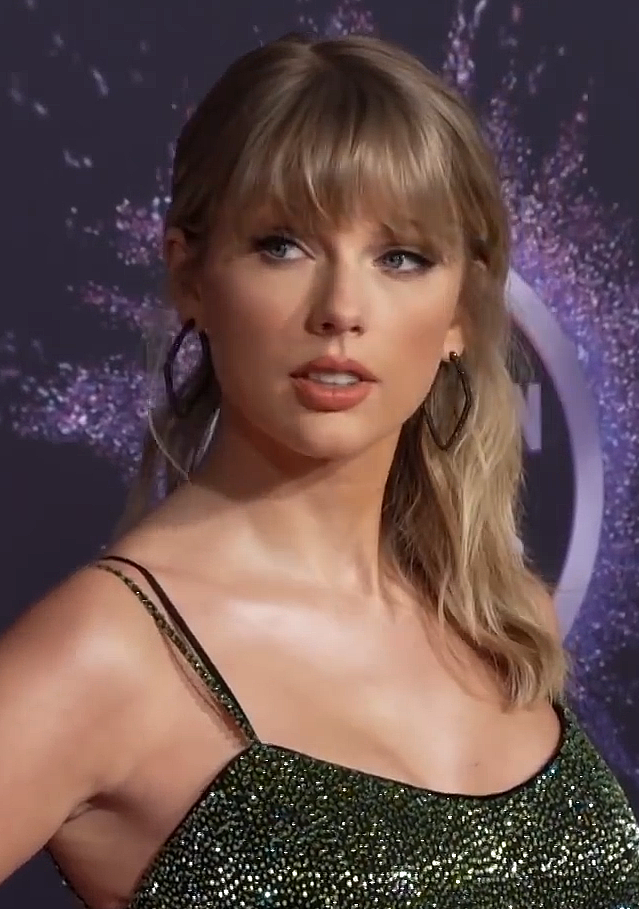
"All Too Well (Taylor's Version)" by Taylor Swift (pictured) became her eighth number-one song and the longest song of all time to top the chart, at 10 minutes and 13 seconds.

Key
†	Indicates best-performing song of 2021

No.	Issue date	Song	Artist(s)	Ref.
re	January 2	"All I Want for Christmas Is You"	Mariah Carey	
re	January 9	"Mood"	24kGoldn featuring Iann Dior	
re	January 16	"Mood"	24kGoldn featuring Iann Dior	
164	January 23	"Drivers License"	Olivia Rodrigo	
164	January 30	"Drivers License"	Olivia Rodrigo	
164	February 6	"Drivers License"	Olivia Rodrigo	
164	February 13	"Drivers License"	Olivia Rodrigo	
164	February 20	"Drivers License"	Olivia Rodrigo	
165	February 27	"Calling My Phone"	Lil Tjay featuring 6lack	
re	March 6	"Drivers License"	Olivia Rodrigo	
re	March 13	"Drivers License"	Olivia Rodrigo	
166	March 20	"What's Next"	Drake	
167	March 27	"Levitating" †	Dua Lipa featuring DaBaby	
168	April 3	"Peaches"	Justin Bieber featuring Daniel Caesar and Giveon	
168	April 10	"Peaches"	Justin Bieber featuring Daniel Caesar and Giveon	
169	April 17	"Montero (Call Me by Your Name)"	Lil Nas X	
170	April 24	"Rapstar"	Polo G	
re	May 1	"Peaches"	Justin Bieber featuring Daniel Caesar and Giveon	
171	May 8	"Save Your Tears"	The Weeknd and Ariana Grande	
re	May 15	"Levitating" †	Dua Lipa featuring DaBaby	
re	May 22	"Levitating" †	Dua Lipa featuring DaBaby	
172	May 29	"Good 4 U"	Olivia Rodrigo	
172	June 5	"Good 4 U"	Olivia Rodrigo	
172	June 12	"Good 4 U"	Olivia Rodrigo	
172	June 19	"Good 4 U"	Olivia Rodrigo	
172	June 26	"Good 4 U"	Olivia Rodrigo	
172	July 3	"Good 4 U"	Olivia Rodrigo	
173	July 10	"Bad Habits"	Ed Sheeran	
173	July 17	"Bad Habits"	Ed Sheeran	
174	July 24	"Stay"	The Kid Laroi and Justin Bieber	
174	July 31	"Stay"	The Kid Laroi and Justin Bieber	
re	August 7	"Bad Habits"	Ed Sheeran	
re	August 14	"Bad Habits"	Ed Sheeran	
re	August 21	"Stay"	The Kid Laroi and Justin Bieber	
re	August 28	"Stay"	The Kid Laroi and Justin Bieber	
re	September 4	"Stay"	The Kid Laroi and Justin Bieber	
re	September 11	"Stay"	The Kid Laroi and Justin Bieber	
re	September 18	"Stay"	The Kid Laroi and Justin Bieber	
re	September 25	"Stay"	The Kid Laroi and Justin Bieber	
re	October 2	"Stay"	The Kid Laroi and Justin Bieber	
re	October 9	"Stay"	The Kid Laroi and Justin Bieber	
re	October 16	"Stay"	The Kid Laroi and Justin Bieber	
re	October 23	"Stay"	The Kid Laroi and Justin Bieber	
175	October 30	"Easy on Me"	Adele	
175	November 6	"Easy on Me"	Adele	
175	November 13	"Easy on Me"	Adele	
175	November 20	"Easy on Me"	Adele	
176	November 27	"All Too Well (Taylor's Version)"	Taylor Swift	
re	December 4	"Easy on Me"	Adele	
re	December 11	"Easy on Me"	Adele	
re	December 18	"Easy on Me"	Adele	
re	December 25	"Easy on Me"	Adele	

== See also ==
- List of number-one albums of 2021 (Canada)
