= List of number-one singles of 2021 (Portugal) =

The Portuguese Singles Chart ranks the best-performing singles in Portugal, as compiled by the Associação Fonográfica Portuguesa.

Number-one singles of 2021 in Portugal
Week	Song	Artist	Reference
1	"São Paulo"	Yuri NR5	
2	"Drivers License"	Olivia Rodrigo	
3	"Drivers License"	Olivia Rodrigo	
4	"Drivers License"	Olivia Rodrigo	
5	"Drivers License"	Olivia Rodrigo	
6	"Drivers License"	Olivia Rodrigo	
7	"Drivers License"	Olivia Rodrigo	
8	"Drivers License"	Olivia Rodrigo	
9	"Drivers License"	Olivia Rodrigo	
10	"Drivers License"	Olivia Rodrigo	
11	"Without You"	The Kid Laroi	
12	"Peaches"	Justin Bieber featuring Daniel Caesar and Giveon	
13	"Peaches"	Justin Bieber featuring Daniel Caesar and Giveon	
14	"Montero (Call Me by Your Name)"	Lil Nas X	
15	"Montero (Call Me by Your Name)"	Lil Nas X	
16	"Montero (Call Me by Your Name)"	Lil Nas X	
17	"Montero (Call Me by Your Name)"	Lil Nas X	
18	"Montero (Call Me by Your Name)"	Lil Nas X	
19	"Montero (Call Me by Your Name)"	Lil Nas X	
20	"Montero (Call Me by Your Name)"	Lil Nas X	
21	"Good 4 U"	Olivia Rodrigo	
22	"Good 4 U"	Olivia Rodrigo	
23	"Good 4 U"	Olivia Rodrigo	
24	"Bipolar"	MC Davi, MC Pedrinho and MC Don Juan	
25	"Bipolar"	MC Davi, MC Pedrinho and MC Don Juan	
26	"Bipolar"	MC Davi, MC Pedrinho and MC Don Juan	
27	"Beggin'"	Måneskin	
28	"Beggin'"	Måneskin	
29	"Beggin'"	Måneskin	
30	"Beggin'"	Måneskin	
31	"Industry Baby"	Lil Nas X and Jack Harlow	
32	"Industry Baby"	Lil Nas X and Jack Harlow	
33	"Industry Baby"	Lil Nas X and Jack Harlow	
34	"Industry Baby"	Lil Nas X and Jack Harlow	
35	"Industry Baby"	Lil Nas X and Jack Harlow	
36	"Pepas"	Farruko	
37	"Pepas"	Farruko	
38	"Industry Baby"	Lil Nas X and Jack Harlow	
39	"Love Nwantiti (Ah Ah Ah)"	CKay featuring Joeboy and Kuami Eugene	
40	"Love Nwantiti (Ah Ah Ah)"	CKay featuring Joeboy and Kuami Eugene	
41	"Love Nwantiti (Ah Ah Ah)"	CKay featuring Joeboy and Kuami Eugene	
42	"Love Nwantiti (Ah Ah Ah)"	CKay featuring Joeboy and Kuami Eugene	
43	"Love Nwantiti (Ah Ah Ah)"	CKay featuring Joeboy and Kuami Eugene	
44	"Love Nwantiti (Ah Ah Ah)"	CKay featuring Joeboy and Kuami Eugene	
45	"Love Nwantiti (Ah Ah Ah)"	CKay featuring Joeboy and Kuami Eugene	
46	"Love Nwantiti (Ah Ah Ah)"	CKay featuring Joeboy and Kuami Eugene	
47	"Love Nwantiti (Ah Ah Ah)"	CKay featuring Joeboy and Kuami Eugene	
48	"Love Nwantiti (Ah Ah Ah)"	CKay featuring Joeboy and Kuami Eugene	
49	"Love Nwantiti (Ah Ah Ah)"	CKay featuring Joeboy and Kuami Eugene	
50	"Love Nwantiti (Ah Ah Ah)"	CKay featuring Joeboy and Kuami Eugene	
51	"Love Nwantiti (Ah Ah Ah)"	CKay featuring Joeboy and Kuami Eugene	
52	"Love Nwantiti (Ah Ah Ah)"	CKay featuring Joeboy and Kuami Eugene	

== See also ==
- List of number-one albums of 2021 (Portugal)
