= List of Billboard Streaming Songs number ones of 2021 =

This is a list of songs that reached number one on the Billboard magazine Streaming Songs chart in 2021.

== Chart history ==
Key
The best-performing single of 2021, "Levitating" by Dua Lipa, never reached number one on the chart.

Issue date	Song	Artist(s)	Weekly streams
January 2	"All I Want for Christmas Is You"	Mariah Carey	54.9 million
January 9	"All I Want for Christmas Is You"	Mariah Carey	22.7 million
January 16	"Mood"	24kGoldn featuring Iann Dior	17.5 million
January 23	"Drivers License"	Olivia Rodrigo	76.1 million
January 30	"Drivers License"	Olivia Rodrigo	59.7 million
February 6	"Drivers License"	Olivia Rodrigo	42.6 million
February 13	"Drivers License"	Olivia Rodrigo	32.2 million
February 20	"Up"	Cardi B	31.2 million
February 27	"Calling My Phone"	Lil Tjay and 6lack	34 million
March 6	"Calling My Phone"	Lil Tjay and 6lack	25.4 million
March 13	"Up"	Cardi B	23.9 million
March 20	"What's Next"	Drake	49.1 million
March 27	"What's Next"	Drake	23 million
April 3	"Peaches"	Justin Bieber featuring Daniel Caesar and Giveon	30.6 million
April 10	"Montero (Call Me by Your Name)"	Lil Nas X	46.9 million
April 17	"Montero (Call Me by Your Name)"	Lil Nas X	38.1 million
April 24	"Rapstar"	Polo G	53.6 million
May 1	"Rapstar"	Polo G	40.3 million
May 8	"Rapstar"	Polo G	34.5 million
May 15	"Rapstar"	Polo G	29.5 million
May 22	"Interlude"	J. Cole	26.6 million
May 29	"Good 4 U"	Olivia Rodrigo	43.2 million
June 5	"Good 4 U"	Olivia Rodrigo	62.7 million
June 12	"Good 4 U"	Olivia Rodrigo	49.5 million
June 19	"Good 4 U"	Olivia Rodrigo	42.1 million
June 26	"Good 4 U"	Olivia Rodrigo	36 million
July 3	"Good 4 U"	Olivia Rodrigo	32 million
July 10	"Good 4 U"	Olivia Rodrigo	30.2 million
July 17	"Good 4 U"	Olivia Rodrigo	27.6 million
July 24	"Stay"	The Kid Laroi and Justin Bieber	34.7 million
July 31	"Stay"	The Kid Laroi and Justin Bieber	28.6 million
August 7	"Industry Baby"	Lil Nas X and Jack Harlow	40.6 million
August 14	"Stay"	The Kid Laroi and Justin Bieber	30.9 million
August 21	"Stay"	The Kid Laroi and Justin Bieber	31.8 million
August 28	"Stay"	The Kid Laroi and Justin Bieber	32.7 million
September 4	"Stay"	The Kid Laroi and Justin Bieber	31.7 million
September 11	"Hurricane"	Kanye West	29 million
September 18	"Way 2 Sexy"	Drake featuring Future and Young Thug	67.3 million
September 25	"Way 2 Sexy"	Drake featuring Future and Young Thug	39.9 million
October 2	"Way 2 Sexy"	Drake featuring Future and Young Thug	32.5 million
October 9	"Way 2 Sexy"	Drake featuring Future and Young Thug	27.6 million
October 16	"Way 2 Sexy"	Drake featuring Future and Young Thug	23.4 million
October 23	"Industry Baby"	Lil Nas X and Jack Harlow	23.2 million
October 30	"Easy on Me"	Adele	53.9 million
November 6	"Easy on Me"	Adele	31.8 million
November 13	"Easy on Me"	Adele	25.8 million
November 20	"Easy on Me"	Adele	23.6 million
November 27	"All Too Well (Taylor's Version)"	Taylor Swift	54.4 million
December 4	"Easy on Me"	Adele	37.5 million
December 11	"All I Want for Christmas Is You"	Mariah Carey	25.8 million
December 18	"All I Want for Christmas Is You"	Mariah Carey	32.5 million
December 25	"All I Want for Christmas Is You"	Mariah Carey	37.6 million

== See also ==
- 2021 in American music
- List of Billboard Hot 100 number ones of 2021
