= List of number-one albums of 2021 (Ireland) =

The Irish Albums Chart ranks the best-performing albums in Ireland, as compiled by the Official Charts Company on behalf of the Irish Recorded Music Association.

== Chart history ==
Issue date	Album	Artist	Reference
1 January	Without Fear	Dermot Kennedy	
8 January	Without Fear	Dermot Kennedy	
15 January	Without Fear	Dermot Kennedy	
22 January	Without Fear	Dermot Kennedy	
29 January	Without Fear	Dermot Kennedy	
5 February	Without Fear	Dermot Kennedy	
12 February	Medicine at Midnight	Foo Fighters	
19 February	Without Fear	Dermot Kennedy	
26 February	Without Fear	Dermot Kennedy	
5 March	Without Fear	Dermot Kennedy	
12 March	When You See Yourself	Kings of Leon	
19 March	Without Fear	Dermot Kennedy	
26 March	Justice	Justin Bieber	
2 April	Justice	Justin Bieber	
9 April	Justice	Justin Bieber	
16 April	Fearless (Taylor's Version)	Taylor Swift	
23 April	11 Past the Hour	Imelda May	
30 April	Without Fear	Dermot Kennedy	
7 May	Typhoons	Royal Blood	
14 May	Without Fear	Dermot Kennedy	
21 May	The Off-Season	J. Cole	
28 May	Sour	Olivia Rodrigo	
4 June	Sour	Olivia Rodrigo	
11 June	Sour	Olivia Rodrigo	
18 June	Sour	Olivia Rodrigo	
25 June	Sour	Olivia Rodrigo	
2 July	Sour	Olivia Rodrigo	
9 July	Sour	Olivia Rodrigo	
16 July	It Won't Always Be Like This	Inhaler	
23 July	Sour	Olivia Rodrigo	
30 July	We're All Alone in This Together	Dave	
6 August	Happier Than Ever	Billie Eilish	
13 August	Sour	Olivia Rodrigo	
20 August	Sour	Olivia Rodrigo	
27 August	Sour	Olivia Rodrigo	
3 September	Donda	Kanye West	
10 September	Certified Lover Boy	Drake	
17 September	Certified Lover Boy	Drake	
24 September	Montero	Lil Nas X	
1 October	Sour	Olivia Rodrigo	
8 October	Tales from the Script: Greatest Hits	The Script	
15 October	Sour	Olivia Rodrigo	
22 October	Music of the Spheres	Coldplay	
29 October	Sour	Olivia Rodrigo	
5 November	=	Ed Sheeran	
12 November	Voyage	ABBA	
19 November	Red (Taylor's Version)	Taylor Swift	
26 November	30	Adele	
3 December	30	Adele	
10 December	30	Adele	
17 December	30	Adele	
24 December	30	Adele	
31 December	30	Adele	

== Number-one artists ==
Position	Artist	Weeks at No. 1
1	Olivia Rodrigo	14
2	Dermot Kennedy	12
3	Adele	6
4	Justin Bieber	3
5	Drake	2
5	Taylor Swift	2
7	Foo Fighters	1
7	Kings of Leon	1
7	Imelda May	1
7	Royal Blood	1
7	J. Cole	1
7	Inhaler	1
7	Dave	1
7	Billie Eilish	1
7	Kanye West	1
7	Lil Nas X	1
7	The Script	1
7	Coldplay	1
7	Ed Sheeran	1
7	ABBA	1

== See also ==
- List of number-one singles of 2021 (Ireland)
- List of top 10 singles in 2021 (Ireland)
