= List of number-one songs of 2021 (Turkey) =

This is the complete list of number-one singles in Turkey in 2021 according to Radiomonitor. The list on the left side of the box (Resmi Liste, "the Official List") represents physical and digital track sales as well as music streaming of the Turkish artists, and the one on the right side (Uluslararası Liste, "the International List") is the same thing for non-Turkish artists.

== Chart history ==
Date	Song (Official)	Artist (Official)	Song (International)	Artist (International)
1 January	Bir Sebebi Var	İkilem	Take You Dancing	Jason Derulo
8 January	Toy	Mabel Matiz	Take You Dancing	Jason Derulo
15 January	Toy	Mabel Matiz	Take You Dancing	Jason Derulo
22 January	Bir Sebebi Var	İkilem	Take You Dancing	Jason Derulo
29 January	Bir Sebebi Var	İkilem	Lovefool (Note: In terms of number of the listeners) (Note: In terms of number of performance)	twocolors
5 February	Sözüm Söz	Hande Ünsal	Lovefool	twocolors
12 February	Hepsi Geçiyor	Oğuzhan Koç	Lovefool; Daisy	twocolors Ashnikko
19 February	Senin Yüzünden	Buray feat. Arem Özgüç & Arman Aydın	Lovefool; Lane Moje	twocolors DJ Dark and DJ Iljano
26 February	Senin Yüzünden	Buray feat. Arem Özgüç & Arman Aydın	Whoopty	CJ
5 March	Hepsi Geçiyor	Oğuzhan Koç	Astronaut in the Ocean	Masked Wolf
12 March	Hepsi Geçiyor	Oğuzhan Koç	Astronaut in the Ocean; Retrograde	Masked Wolf; Aleyna Tilki
19 March	Hepsi Geçiyor	Oğuzhan Koç	Astronaut in the Ocean	Masked Wolf
26 March	Hepsi Geçiyor	Oğuzhan Koç	Astronaut in the Ocean	Masked Wolf
2 April	Hepsi Geçiyor	Oğuzhan Koç	Astronaut in the Ocean	Masked Wolf
9 April	Hepsi Geçiyor	Oğuzhan Koç	Astronaut in the Ocean	Masked Wolf
16 April	Seni Soruyorlar	Ersay Üner	Astronaut in the Ocean	Masked Wolf
23 April	Martılar	Edis	Astronaut in the Ocean	Masked Wolf
30 April	Martılar	Edis	Astronaut in the Ocean	Masked Wolf
7 May	Martılar	Edis	Astronaut in the Ocean	Masked Wolf
13 May	Martılar	Edis	Friday	Riton and Nightcrawlers ft. Mufasa & Hypeman
21 May	Martılar	Edis	Friday	Riton and Nightcrawlers ft. Mufasa & Hypeman
28 May	Martılar	Edis	Friday	Riton and Nightcrawlers ft. Mufasa & Hypeman
4 June	Benim O	Tuğba Yurt	Friday	Riton and Nightcrawlers ft. Mufasa & Hypeman
11 June	Martılar	Edis	Montero (Call Me by Your Name); Astronaut in the Ocean	Lil Nas X Masked Wolf
18 June	Benim O	Tuğba Yurt	Montero (Call Me by Your Name); Astronaut in the Ocean	Lil Nas X Masked Wolf
25 June	Benim O	Tuğba Yurt	Montero (Call Me by Your Name); Astronaut in the Ocean	Lil Nas X Masked Wolf
2 July	Benim O	Tuğba Yurt	The Business	Tiësto
9 July	Kanunlar Gibi	Derya Uluğ	Montero (Call Me by Your Name) The Business	Lil Nas X Tiësto
16 July	Kanunlar Gibi	Derya Uluğ	Montero (Call Me by Your Name) The Business	Lil Nas X Tiësto
23 July	Kanunlar Gibi	Derya Uluğ	Montero (Call Me by Your Name) The Business	Lil Nas X Tiësto
30 July	Kanunlar Gibi	Derya Uluğ	The Business	Tiësto
6 August	Kanunlar Gibi	Derya Uluğ	Montero (Call Me by Your Name); Jalebi Baby	Lil Nas X Tesher
13 August	Kanunlar Gibi	Derya Uluğ	Montero (Call Me by Your Name); Jalebi Baby	Lil Nas X Tesher
20 August	Kanunlar Gibi	Derya Uluğ	Kiss Me More; Jalebi Baby	Doja Cat feat. SZA; Tesher
27 August	Kanunlar Gibi	Derya Uluğ	Iko Iko (My Bestie); Jalebi Baby	Justin Wellington feat. Small Jam; Tesher
3 September	Kanunlar Gibi	Derya Uluğ	Love Tonight; Step by Step	Shouse; Sleepy Chows feat. Antomage & Bromage
10 September	Kanunlar Gibi	Derya Uluğ	Love Tonight	Shouse
17 September	Kanunlar Gibi	Derya Uluğ	Iko Iko (My Bestie); Step by Step	Justin Wellington feat. Small Jam; Sleepy Chows feat. Antomage & Bromage
24 September	Hay Hay	Hadise	Love Tonight	Shouse
1 October	Yoksa Yasak	Oğuzhan Koç feat. Arem Özgüç & Arman Aydın	Love Tonight; Step by Step	Shouse; Sleepy Chows feat. Antomage & Bromage
8 October	Yoksa Yasak	Oğuzhan Koç feat. Arem Özgüç & Arman Aydın	Love Tonight; Step by Step	Shouse; Sleepy Chows feat. Antomage & Bromage
15 October	Affet Beni Sevgilim	Ege Balkız feat. Burry Soprano	Love Tonight	Shouse
22 October	Hayatım Kaymış	Melek Mosso	Love Tonight; Step by Step	Shouse; Sleepy Chows feat. Antomage & Bromage
29 October	Hayatım Kaymış	Melek Mosso	Love Tonight; Love Nwantiti	Shouse; CKay feat. Joeboy and Kuami Eugene
5 November	Hayatım Kaymış	Melek Mosso	Love Nwantiti	CKay feat. Joeboy and Kuami Eugene
12 November	Hayatım Kaymış	Melek Mosso	Love Nwantiti	CKay feat. Joeboy and Kuami Eugene
19 November	Hayatım Kaymış	Melek Mosso	Love Nwantiti	CKay feat. Joeboy and Kuami Eugene
26 November	Arıyorum	Edis	Love Nwantiti	CKay feat. Joeboy and Kuami Eugene
3 December	Hayatım Kaymış	Melek Mosso	Love Nwantiti	CKay feat. Joeboy and Kuami Eugene
10 December	Hayatım Kaymış	Melek Mosso	Love Nwantiti	CKay feat. Joeboy and Kuami Eugene
17 December	Hayatım Kaymış	Melek Mosso	Love Nwantiti	CKay feat. Joeboy and Kuami Eugene
24 December	Arıyorum	Edis	Love Nwantiti	CKay feat. Joeboy and Kuami Eugene
