= List of number-one albums of 2021 (Canada) =

These are the Canadian number-one albums of 2021. The chart is compiled by Nielsen SoundScan and published in Billboard magazine as Top Canadian Albums.

== Number-one albums ==
Key
†	Indicates best-performing album of 2021

Issue date	Album	Artist(s)	Ref.
January 2	Christmas	Michael Bublé	
January 9	Evermore	Taylor Swift	
January 16	Evermore	Taylor Swift	
January 23	Dangerous: The Double Album †	Morgan Wallen	
January 30	Dangerous: The Double Album †	Morgan Wallen	
February 6	Dangerous: The Double Album †	Morgan Wallen	
February 13	Dangerous: The Double Album †	Morgan Wallen	
February 20	The Highlights	The Weeknd	
February 27	Dangerous: The Double Album †	Morgan Wallen	
March 6	Dangerous: The Double Album †	Morgan Wallen	
March 13	Dangerous: The Double Album †	Morgan Wallen	
March 20	Dangerous: The Double Album †	Morgan Wallen	
March 27	The Highlights	The Weeknd	
April 3	Justice	Justin Bieber	
April 10	Justice	Justin Bieber	
April 17	Justice	Justin Bieber	
April 24	Fearless (Taylor's Version)	Taylor Swift	
May 1	Justice	Justin Bieber	
May 8	Phoenix	Charlotte Cardin	
May 15	Phoenix	Charlotte Cardin	
May 22	Justice	Justin Bieber	
May 29	The Off-Season	J. Cole	
June 5	Sour	Olivia Rodrigo	
June 12	Sour	Olivia Rodrigo	
June 19	Sour	Olivia Rodrigo	
June 26	Sour	Olivia Rodrigo	
July 3	Sour	Olivia Rodrigo	
July 10	Sour	Olivia Rodrigo	
July 17	Sour	Olivia Rodrigo	
July 24	Sour	Olivia Rodrigo	
July 31	Faith	Pop Smoke	
August 7	F*ck Love	The Kid Laroi	
August 14	Happier Than Ever	Billie Eilish	
August 21	Happier Than Ever	Billie Eilish	
August 28	F*ck Love	The Kid Laroi	
September 4	F*ck Love	The Kid Laroi	
September 11	Donda	Kanye West	
September 18	Certified Lover Boy	Drake	
September 25	Certified Lover Boy	Drake	
October 2	Certified Lover Boy	Drake	
October 9	Certified Lover Boy	Drake	
October 16	Certified Lover Boy	Drake	
October 23	Certified Lover Boy	Drake	
October 30	Certified Lover Boy	Drake	
November 6	Certified Lover Boy	Drake	
November 13	=	Ed Sheeran	
November 20	=	Ed Sheeran	
November 27	Red (Taylor's Version)	Taylor Swift	
December 4	30	Adele	
December 11	30	Adele	
December 18	30	Adele	
December 25	30	Adele	

== See also ==
- List of Canadian Hot 100 number-one singles of 2021
