= List of number-one singles of 2021 (Ireland) =

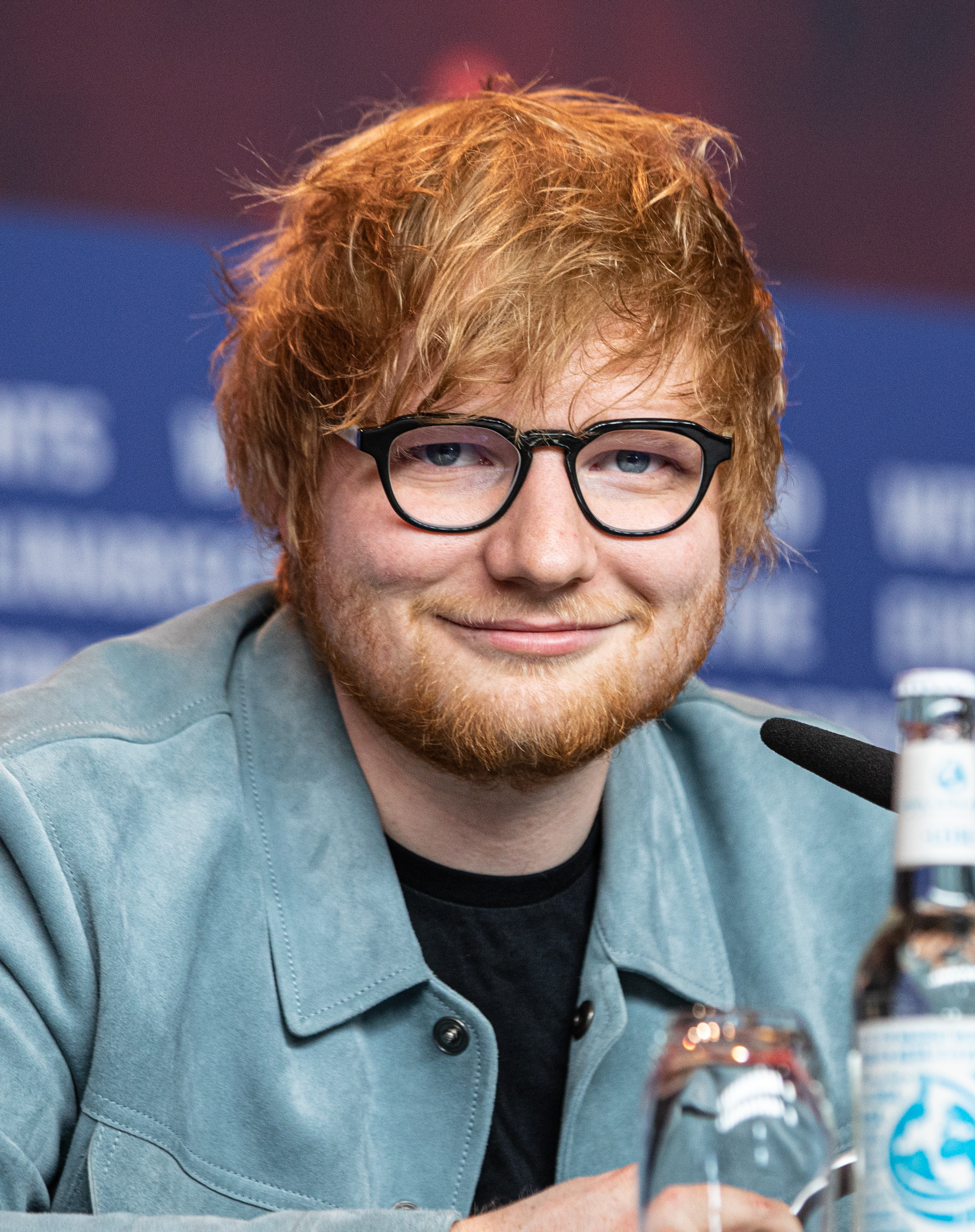
Ed Sheeran had three number ones this year.

The Irish Singles Chart ranks the best-performing singles in Ireland, as compiled by the Official Charts Company on behalf of the Irish Recorded Music Association.

Issue date	Song	Artist(s)	Reference
1 January	"Paradise"	Meduza featuring Dermot Kennedy	
8 January	"Paradise"	Meduza featuring Dermot Kennedy	
15 January	"Drivers License"	Olivia Rodrigo	
22 January	"Drivers License"	Olivia Rodrigo	
29 January	"Drivers License"	Olivia Rodrigo	
5 February	"Drivers License"	Olivia Rodrigo	
12 February	"Drivers License"	Olivia Rodrigo	
19 February	"Drivers License"	Olivia Rodrigo	
26 February	"Drivers License"	Olivia Rodrigo	
5 March	"Drivers License"	Olivia Rodrigo	
12 March	"Drivers License"	Olivia Rodrigo	
19 March	"The Business"	Tiësto	
26 March	"Peaches"	Justin Bieber featuring Daniel Caesar and Giveon	
2 April	"Montero (Call Me by Your Name)"	Lil Nas X	
9 April	"Montero (Call Me by Your Name)"	Lil Nas X	
16 April	"Montero (Call Me by Your Name)"	Lil Nas X	
23 April	"Montero (Call Me by Your Name)"	Lil Nas X	
30 April	"Montero (Call Me by Your Name)"	Lil Nas X	
7 May	"Body"	Tion Wayne and Russ Millions	
14 May	"Body"	Tion Wayne and Russ Millions	
21 May	"Good 4 U"	Olivia Rodrigo	
28 May	"Good 4 U"	Olivia Rodrigo	
4 June	"Good 4 U"	Olivia Rodrigo	
11 June	"Good 4 U"	Olivia Rodrigo	
18 June	"Good 4 U"	Olivia Rodrigo	
25 June	"Good 4 U"	Olivia Rodrigo	
2 July	"Bad Habits"	Ed Sheeran	
9 July	"Bad Habits"	Ed Sheeran	
16 July	"Bad Habits"	Ed Sheeran	
23 July	"Bad Habits"	Ed Sheeran	
30 July	"Bad Habits"	Ed Sheeran	
6 August	"Bad Habits"	Ed Sheeran	
13 August	"Bad Habits"	Ed Sheeran	
20 August	"Bad Habits"	Ed Sheeran	
27 August	"Bad Habits"	Ed Sheeran	
3 September	"Bad Habits"	Ed Sheeran	
10 September	"Bad Habits"	Ed Sheeran	
17 September	"Shivers"	Ed Sheeran	
24 September	"Shivers"	Ed Sheeran	
1 October	"Shivers"	Ed Sheeran	
8 October	"Shivers"	Ed Sheeran	
15 October	"Shivers"	Ed Sheeran	
22 October	"Easy on Me"	Adele	
29 October	"Easy on Me"	Adele	
5 November	"Easy on Me"	Adele	
12 November	"Easy on Me"	Adele	
19 November	"All Too Well (Taylor's Version)"	Taylor Swift	
26 November	"Easy on Me"	Adele	
3 December	"Easy on Me"	Adele	
10 December	"Easy on Me"	Adele	
17 December	"Easy on Me"	Adele	
24 December	"Merry Christmas"	Ed Sheeran and Elton John	
31 December	"Merry Christmas"	Ed Sheeran and Elton John	

== Number-one artists ==
Position	Artist	Weeks at No. 1
1	Ed Sheeran	18
2	Olivia Rodrigo	15
3	Adele	9
4	Lil Nas X	5
5	Meduza	2
5	Dermot Kennedy	2
5	Tion Wayne	2
5	Russ Millions	2
5	Elton John	2
9	Tiësto	1
9	Justin Bieber	1
9	Daniel Caesar	1
9	Giveon	1
9	Taylor Swift	1

== See also ==
- List of number-one albums of 2021 (Ireland)
- List of top 10 singles in 2021 (Ireland)
