= Montero (Call Me by Your Name) =

2021 single by Lil Nas X

- Original single cover, designed by Filip Ćustić

Single by Lil Nas X

from the album Montero
- Released: March 26, 2021
- Recorded: July 9, 2020
- Genre: Hip hop; electropop
- Length: 2:17
- Label: Columbia
- Songwriters: Montero Hill; Denzel Baptiste; David Biral; Omer Fedi; Rosario Lenzo
- Producers: Take a Daytrip; Omer Fedi; Roy Lenzo

Lil Nas X singles chronology
"Holiday" (2020)	"Montero (Call Me by Your Name)" (2021)	"Sun Goes Down" (2021)

Music video
- "Montero (Call Me by Your Name)" on YouTube

"Montero (Call Me by Your Name)" is a song by the American rapper and singer Lil Nas X. First previewed in a Super Bowl LV commercial in February 2021, the song was released on March 26, 2021, through Columbia Records, as the lead single and title track from his debut studio album, Montero (2021). It was written by Lil Nas X himself, along with its producers, Take a Daytrip, Omer Fedi, and Roy Lenzo. Musically, the song is a hip-hop and electropop record.

The song is noted for its queer themes, including its gay references and lyrics, taking its name from a 2007 book, Call Me by Your Name, which centers on a gay romance. The "camp", tongue-in-cheek, sexually charged music video for the song depicts Lil Nas X in a number of ironic yet thought-provoking Christian-inspired scenes, including the artist riding a stripper pole to Hell, and giving a lap dance to Satan. The song and video were praised by commentators for their black and queer sensibilities, though the video received backlash from a number of American conservative figureheads who deemed the content "immoral" or harmful to children.

"Montero (Call Me by Your Name)" debuted at the top spot of the Billboard Hot 100, giving Lil Nas X his second number-one hit after his debut single, "Old Town Road" (2019). The single was certified sextuple platinum in the United States by the Recording Industry Association of America (RIAA) in November 2022. Outside of the US, "Montero (Call Me By Your Name)" topped the charts in 20 other countries, including Canada, France, and the United Kingdom. The song received nominations for Record of the Year, Song of the Year and Best Music Video at the 2022 Grammy Awards. It has over 2 billion streams on Spotify, once ranking among the 100 most-streamed songs on the platform.

== Background ==
In 2019, Lil Nas X released "Old Town Road", a single that would go on to set a record for the longest-charting number-one song on the Billboard Hot 100. However, with some people dismissing his success as a one-hit wonder, Lil Nas X wanted to depart from the country trap sound of "Old Town Road" when working on his debut album; instead, he focused on rap, pop, and R&B, influenced by Drake and Nicki Minaj. Take a Daytrip, who produced the song, described the process behind creating the song as serendipitous. In early 2020, Lil Nas X asked the production duo to executively produce his debut album, and started recording ideas on his phone during COVID-19 lockdown. In a recording session, Lil Nas X came up with the lyrics "Call me when you want, call me when you need, call me in the morning", which led to producer Omer Fedi recording a guitar part, which was then done on banjo.

Originally titled "Call Me by Your Name", Lil Nas X played a snippet of the song in a Twitter video on July 9, 2020, as well as in the background of various TikTok videos, including one that was addressed to hip-hop rapper 6ix9ine. It was featured in a Logitech commercial that aired during Super Bowl LV in February 2021. On March 9, 2021, its release date was announced via Twitter, along with its cover. The single cover was created by Spanish–Croatian artist Filip Ćustić and features Lil Nas X as both Adam and God in a reinterpretation of Michelangelo's The Creation of Adam.

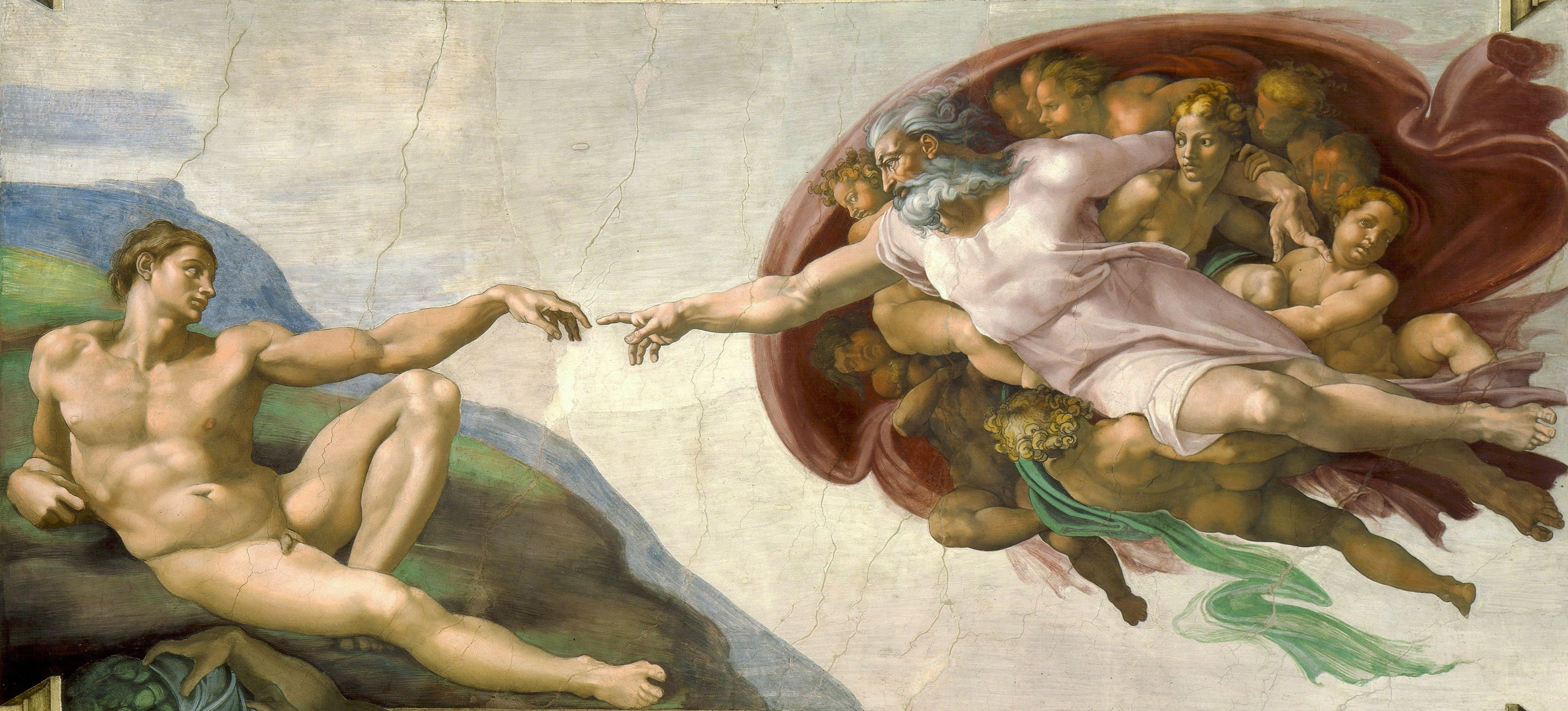
The song's cover art features Lil Nas X in a reinterpretation of Michelangelo's The Creation of Adam.

The song's title is taken from Lil Nas X's real first name, while the subtitle is a reference to the 2017 LGBT romance-themed film of the same name. André Aciman, author of the novel from which the film was adapted, expressed that he was grateful and humbled that Lil Nas X had written a song with the same name as his novel. Lil Nas X later stated the film was one of the first queer movies he had ever seen that felt "very artsy" and made him interested in the concept of "calling somebody by your own name as lovers and trying to keep it between you two", inspiring him to write about it.

In an interview with Zane Lowe on the day before the release, he described his newfound self-confidence after being able to express himself freely in his new song. Furthermore, in the May issue of GQ Style, he described the conflict between his sexuality and his Christian upbringing, notably his father's role as a gospel singer, calling the new song and video "rebellious" because they allowed him to express himself in a way he hadn't before. On the day of the single's release, Lil Nas X shared an open letter to his 14-year-old self on Twitter, reflecting on his choice to come out at an early age and his nervousness about the song. However, he ultimately says it "will open doors for many other queer people to simply exist" and expressed his desire to let people be who they are.

== Composition ==
"Montero (Call Me by Your Name)" is a hip hop and electropop song with guitar and handclaps in syncopation. Billboard described the track as a "flamenco-like track with a subtle trap beat", while Consequence of Sound called it "flamenco and reggaeton dipped in pop". Slate noted the song's "dembow-style rhythm" while the chorus was compared to technopop in the style of Gary Numan. Lil Nas X's vocals in the second verse were likened to a cross between Juice Wrld and Iann Dior. The humming section following the chorus was included as a sort of mating call. A longer version of the song, dubbed "Satan's extended version", adds an extra half-minute and features an additional iteration of the chorus as well as a longer outro.

The song is played alla breve at 90 beats per minute and was originally published in G♯ minor, with a vocal range from G♯_{3} to G♯_{5}. Like previous songs by production duo Take a Daytrip, "Montero (Call Me by Your Name)" is in the Phrygian mode and was described as having a "Middle Eastern or Moorish or Spanish sound". Its chord progression, D♯–E–E–D♯, goes up and down a minor second, which was intended to create and release tension. Guitarist Omer Fedi plays the banjo on a harmonic minor scale, which was later processed with reverb and Auto-Tune.

The song, like many of Lil Nas X's past projects, features queer themes. Renting out an Airbnb at the start of the COVID-19 pandemic to work on his debut album, Lil Nas X revealed that it was written about a man he met in mid-2020 who was partying and taking drugs while in quarantine. In its lyrics, Lil Nas X tells his lover he no longer wants to be on the down-low. He features the line "shoot a child in yo' mouth while I'm ridin'", which was intended to help break the stigma around references to gay sexual practices in music. Lil Nas X revealed he was afraid of turning away straight fans with an explicit lyric about gay sex, but decided "if they feel offended, they were never really here for me." The lyrics also discuss the pressure Lil Nas X feels in representing the LGBT community ("A sign of the times every time that I speak") and include a reference to the 19 weeks his single "Old Town Road" spent atop the Billboard Hot 100 ("A dime and a nine / It was mine every week").

== Release and promotion ==
The original track and music video were released on March 26, 2021, with an extended version released on March 29. In addition, Lil Nas X released a number of follow-up videos via his YouTube channel, including a muffled version (titled "MONTERO but ur in the bathroom of hell while lil nas is giving satan a lap dance in the other room") on March 28, an instrumental version (subtitled "But Lil Nas X Is Silent The Entire Time") on March 31, a behind-the-scenes look behind the song's recording process (subtitled "Official Video except its not the official video at all") on April 5, and a lo-fi version (subtitled "but it's lofi and something you can study to lol") on April 9. The lo-fi version was produced by L. Dre and Zeuz Makes Music, and was previously uploaded to the latter's YouTube channel a few days earlier. On April 23, he released an a cappella version along with an accompanying music video in the style of The Brady Bunch.

Following the song's release, he launched a promotion on Twitter where he gave out $100,000 worth of Bitcoin. He also offered $10,000 through a pole dancing challenge on the social media platform TikTok, with the hashtag #PoleDanceToHell. Another promotional tool was a collaboration with augmented reality mobile app Jadu, in which users can interact with a volumetric video-generated Lil Nas X wearing red angel wings. In addition, a free browser game titled Twerk Hero was released, in which the player controls a virtual Lil Nas X twerking to "Montero (Call Me by Your Name)". Developed by Roni Games using the Unreal Engine, the rhythm game has four levels, each accompanying a scene from the song's music video, and was noted for its jiggle physics. Lil Nas X also unveiled several T-shirts in collaboration with Pizzaslime.

On April 13, it was reported that the song was briefly removed from streaming services for unknown reasons, after Lil Nas X had asked his fans to stream the song "because it may no longer be available tomorrow". Columbia Records released a statement that the situation was "out of their control", but did not elaborate. However, later the same day, Billboard reported that the song was not being removed from streaming services, though no further explanation was offered.

=== Satan Shoes ===
Tying into the music video's theme, Lil Nas X collaborated with art collective MSCHF Product Studio to create 666 individually numbered pairs of Nike Air Max 97 "Satan Shoes" adorned with pentagrams, inverted crosses, and the Bible verse Luke 10:18. They also contain 66 cc (4.0 cu in) of ink mixed with one drop of blood from a member of the MSCHF team in the sole, which was collected over the course of a week. The shoes, which were priced at $1,018 per pair and sold out in under a minute, were compared to comic books by rock band Kiss and Marvel Comics that were printed using the band members' blood. Nike, Inc. was not involved with the design or release of the shoes, and later filed a lawsuit against MSCHF for trademark infringement and dilution. In defense, MSCHF claimed that the shoes were meant to be a form of art for display and not to actually be worn. A U.S. District Court in New York approved of a temporary restraining order against MSCHF, thereby preventing further sales of the shoes, though they were already shipped to their buyers. The lawsuit was eventually settled, with MSCHF issuing a voluntary product recall and buying back any Satan Shoes at their original price.

=== Live performances ===
Lil Nas X performed the song as the musical guest on the last episode of season 46 of Saturday Night Live. Airing May 22, 2021, and hosted by actress Anya Taylor-Joy, the episode also featured the performance of his newest song "Sun Goes Down". During the performance of "Montero (Call Me by Your Name)", a wardrobe malfunction occurred, splitting the seam of his trousers when he squatted during a pole dance routine, leaving him unable to perform it as planned. Lil Nas X also performed the song at the 2021 BET Awards on June 27, 2021. The ancient Egypt-themed performance was a tribute to the visuals of "Remember the Time" by Michael Jackson and ended with the singer kissing a male backup dancer. Billboard ranked the performance number-one out of the sixteen in the ceremony, noting it was "the highlight of the night". Madonna compared the performance with her 2003 MTV Video Music Awards performance, when she kissed Christina Aguilera and Britney Spears on stage while performing "Hollywood", by sharing the photos of both kisses one above the other on her Instagram stories and captioning it with "#DidItFirst". Fans immediately perceived the post as an insult and began to criticise Madonna; however, Lil Nas X dismissed the post as a joke and stated he's friends with Madonna.

== Music video ==
=== Production ===
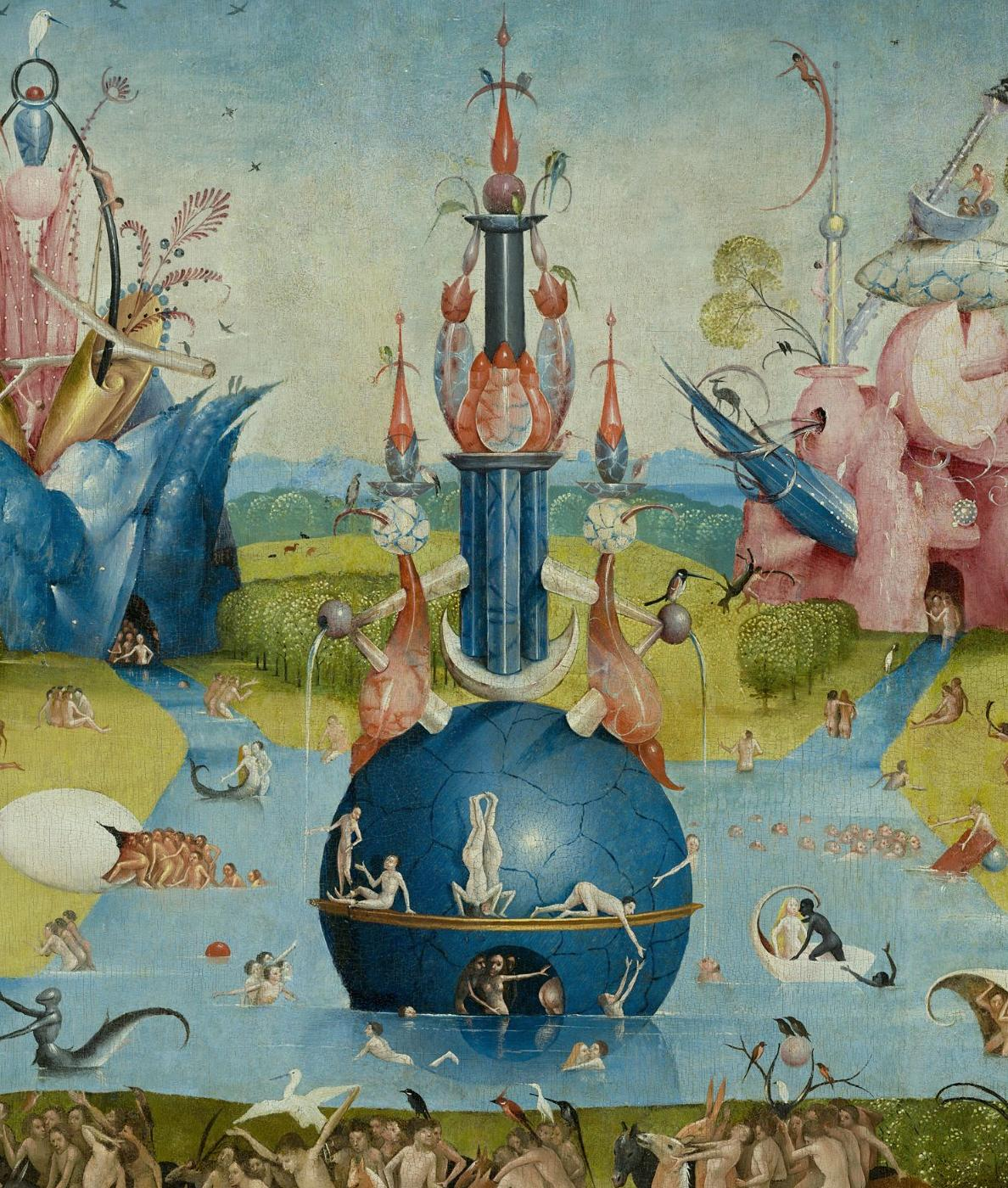
Detail from The Garden of Earthly Delights, one of the works cited by director Tanu Muino as an inspiration for the imagery in the music video for "Montero (Call Me by Your Name)".

The music video for "Montero (Call Me by Your Name)" was directed by Ukrainian music video director Tanu Muino and Lil Nas X and was released along with the single. Shot over two days in February 2021, it features Lil Nas X as various characters in biblical and mythology-inspired scenes. While in Los Angeles, Muino expressed her interest in working with Lil Nas X to Columbia Records; the label contacted her in late January 2021 while she was working on the music video for Cardi B's "Up". She spent two weeks on pre-production with producers Marco De Molina, Frank Borin, and Ivanna Borin before shooting with Lil Nas X. Muino drew inspiration from Dante's Inferno and paintings by Hieronymus Bosch, including The Garden of Earthly Delights—a triptych depicting heavenly and hellish imagery and the Last Judgment. It was Muino's first video as co-director, part of which was done remotely via Zoom after she had falsely tested positive for COVID-19. Anthony H. Nguyen was responsible for the make-up in the video while the hairstyling was done by Evanie Frausto. Visual effects for the music video were done by Mathematic, a French animation studio based in Paris, in a process that took seven weeks. They opted for a video game-inspired look in order to spread a "message of tolerance".

In an interview with Time, Lil Nas X revealed that inspiration for the video came from the animated television series SpongeBob SquarePants and the film Call Me by Your Name. He also discussed the music video for "Cellophane" by FKA Twigs as an influence, stating, "I wanted to see some things people have done in music videos with the pole—and I felt like Twigs did a really amazing job at that... I wanted to do my own take on it." Vulture reported that this was an homage to honor Twigs following her loss to Lil Nas X in the Grammy Award for Best Music Video category. However, "Cellophane" director Andrew Thomas Huang posted a comparison of the two videos' visual similarities on Instagram, explaining that Lil Nas X's label had contacted him prior to the recording of the video to possibly direct it and had instead hired the same choreographer. He further elaborated, "When someone who is commercially successful makes work that lives so similarly next to ours and profits from it on such a massive scale, then I felt like I had to speak up", but said he blamed record labels rather than Lil Nas X. FKA Twigs and Lil Nas X later had a conversation regarding the comparison and praised each other's videos on Instagram.

=== Synopsis ===
Following a voice-over introduction where Lil Nas X discusses not having to hide in shame, the music video begins with the singer portraying both Adam and the serpent in the Garden of Eden. The serpent seduces Adam using its third eye, and the two kiss. The next scene features Lil Nas X in chains at the Colosseum as he is judged by versions of himself in Marie Antoinette wigs and stoned by spectators. After he is killed by a thrown butt plug, he starts to ascend toward an angelic figure in Heaven before grabbing onto a pole, which sends him down to Hell as he pole dances. He makes his way over to Satan and proceeds to give him a lap dance wearing Calvin Klein underwear and thigh-high boots with stiletto heels. After snapping Satan's neck, Lil Nas X crowns himself with the horns as his eyes glow and wings emerge.

=== Analysis ===
In addition to its biblical references and symbolism, the music video features a running theme of duality, including good vs. evil and masculinity vs. femininity. A Greek quotation from Plato's Symposium is shown on the tree of life: "After the division the two parts of man, each desiring his other half". The scene in the Colosseum was seen as a reference to the trial of Jesus before Pontius Pilate, while the judges' costumes were inspired by the all-denim outfits worn by Britney Spears and Justin Timberlake in 2001. The Latin phrase "Damnant quod non intelligunt" is written on the ground below Satan, which translates to "they condemn what they do not understand". According to a press release accompanying the video, the final scene represents "dismantling the throne of judgement and punishment that has kept many of us from embracing our true selves out of fear."

An analysis of the music video's symbolism by historians compared the snake figure to Lilith from Jewish mythology, who has often been depicted as a serpentine demon. The stoning scene saw Lil Nas X represented as a Christian martyr and the angelic figure was seen to represent Ganymede from Greek mythology, who is widely regarded as a symbol of homosexuality. The video also drew comparisons with the character HIM from the animated series The Powerpuff Girls, for portraying the devil as a "queer-coded" entity or a "red, gay man", a trope that became prominent in cartoons from the 1990s. Rebecca Long wrote for Observer: "Intentionally or not, Lil Nas X draws on this history in 'Montero', reclaiming the motif and continuing a long tradition of queer blasphemy".

== Reception and controversy ==
The song and music video received praise from several outlets for being "unabashedly queer". Variety's Adam B. Vary wrote that the video "changed everything for queer music artists", noting that some LGBT artists like Jonathan Knight of New Kids on the Block and Lance Bass of NSYNC sang about women while staying closeted, while others like Elton John and Ricky Martin did not explicitly sing about their sexuality. He described the sexual imagery, including the pole dance, as evoking images of Madonna or Janet Jackson, without the need to hide his homosexuality. He also remarked that artists like Frank Ocean and Troye Sivan were bolder about their sexuality, but had never reached the same level of commercial success as Lil Nas X. David Harris, a magister of the Church of Satan, approved of the music video's portrayal of consensual sexuality as well as the ending of Lil Nas X crowning himself Satan.

The music video received criticism from conservative commentators in the United States who deemed it immoral or harmful to children. Governor of South Dakota Kristi Noem, conservative pundit Candace Owens, Kaitlin Bennett, and evangelical pastor Mark Burns all reacted negatively on Twitter, as did rapper Joyner Lucas and athletes Nick Young and Trevor Lawrence. In response to criticism, Lil Nas X wrote on Twitter: "There is a mass shooting every week that our government does nothing to stop. Me sliding down a CGI pole isn't what's destroying society" and "I am an adult. I am not gonna spend my entire career trying to cater to your children. That is your job", among other retorts. However, he also confessed that the backlash was "putting an emotional toll" on him.

The negative reception to the song and music video was characterized by Los Angeles Times and Vice as illustrating a Satanic panic and compared to past moments in popular music history, including jazz music being referred to as "the devil's music" in the early 20th century, John Lennon's comment in a 1966 interview that the Beatles were "more popular than Jesus", backmasking accusations, the Parents Music Resource Center's "Filthy Fifteen", Madonna's music video for "Like a Prayer", Lady Gaga's music videos for "Judas" and "Alejandro", and Nicki Minaj's performance of "Roman Holiday" at the 54th Annual Grammy Awards. Esquire referred to it as "beelzepop" (a play on Beelzebub) and similarly compared reception to Gaga's "Judas" and Minaj's "Roman Holiday".

The controversy has been described as being part of the marketing strategy for the song. Neena Rouhani of Billboard depicted the social media outrage as his "greatest marketing tool", and Kevin Meenan, a music charts manager at YouTube, described it as "very explicit", and that controversy was his goal. Jon Caramanica of The New York Times compared the controversy to bait, and a performance of moral panic, noting how he uses Twitter as a "performance space ... with an almost limitless audience".

The visuals of the music video became popular on social media, with the pole dance becoming a meme on TikTok. Additionally, the music video and its reception were lampooned on a Saturday Night Live cold open, with Chris Redd as Lil Nas X discussing the controversy with Chloe Fineman as Britney Spears. In June 2021, a 36 ft × 36 ft (11 m × 11 m) mural depicting three of Lil Nas X's looks in the music video was put up in Philadelphia's Gayborhood.

=== Rankings ===
Critical rankings for "Montero (Call Me by Your Name)"
Publication	Accolade	Rank	Ref.
Pitchfork	The 100 Best Songs of 2021	62	

== Accolades ==
Awards and nominations for "Montero (Call Me By Your Name)"
Year	Organization	Award	Result	Ref(s)
2021	MTV Millennial Awards	Global Hit of the Year	Nominated	
2021	Rockbjörnen	Foreign Song of the Year	Nominated	
2021	MTV Video Music Awards	Video of the Year	Won	
2021	MTV Video Music Awards	Video for Good	Nominated	
2021	MTV Video Music Awards	Best Direction	Won	
2021	MTV Video Music Awards	Best Art Direction	Nominated	
2021	MTV Video Music Awards	Best Visual Effects	Won	
2021	MTV Millennial Awards Brazil	Global Hit	Nominated	
2021	BET Hip Hop Awards	Best Hip Hop Video	Nominated	
2021	BET Hip Hop Awards	Impact Track	Nominated	
2021	UK Music Video Awards	Best Pop Video – International	Nominated	
2021	LOS40 Music Awards	Best International Song	Nominated	
2021	LOS40 Music Awards	Best International Video	Nominated	
2021	MTV Europe Music Awards	Best Song	Nominated	
2021	MTV Europe Music Awards	Best Video	Won	
2021	MTV Europe Music Awards	Video for Good	Nominated	
2021	American Music Awards	Favorite Music Video	Won	
2021	People's Choice Awards	The Song of 2021	Nominated	
2021	People's Choice Awards	The Music Video of 2021	Nominated	
2022	Grammy Awards	Record of the Year	Nominated	
2022	Grammy Awards	Song of the Year	Nominated	
2022	Grammy Awards	Best Music Video	Nominated	
2022	APRA Music Awards	Most Performed International Work	Nominated	

== Commercial performance ==
"Montero (Call Me by Your Name)" debuted at the top of the Billboard Hot 100 for the week of April 10, 2021, with 21,000 downloads, 46.9 million streams, and 1.1 million radio airplay audience impressions. It also debuted at number one on Billboard's Streaming Songs chart and the US Rolling Stone Top 100, and at number two on the Billboard Digital Song Sales chart. The song reached number one on the latter chart during its third week, selling 19,500 downloads and rising from number 3 to become his second leader after his 2019 hit "Old Town Road" solo or featuring Billy Ray Cyrus.

In the United Kingdom, "Montero (Call Me by Your Name)" was the most-streamed song during its week of release, with 6.8 million plays (including 2.5 million video streams), and debuted at the top of the UK Singles Chart on April 2, 2021 – for the week ending date April 8, 2021 – becoming Lil Nas X's second number one song in Britain following "Old Town Road" in April 2019. The song sold 62,000 copies and was streamed 8.6 million times in its second week at the top. The song spent five weeks atop the chart.

In Ireland, the song also debuted at the top of the Irish Singles Chart on April 2, 2021 – for the week ending date April 8, 2021 – becoming Lil Nas X's second number one song in the Irish Republic following "Old Town Road" in April 2019. The following week, it stayed atop the chart and was the most-streamed song in the country that week.

In Australia, the song debuted at number 16 on the ARIA Singles Chart as the highest debut of the week and soared to number 3 the following week, becoming his second top ten hit on the chart. The song later reached its peak of number 1.

== Track listing ==
- Original version
1. "Montero (Call Me by Your Name)" – 2:17
- Extended version
1. "Montero (Call Me by Your Name)" – 2:17
2. "Montero (Call Me by Your Name)" (Satan's extended version) – 2:50
- Instrumental version
1. "Montero (Call Me by Your Name)" – 2:17
2. "Montero (Call Me by Your Name)" (Satan's extended version) – 2:50
3. "Montero (Call Me by Your Name)" (But Lil Nas X is silent the entire time) – 2:48
- EP version
1. "Montero (Call Me by Your Name)" – 2:17
2. "Montero (Call Me by Your Name)" (But Lil Nas X makes all the sounds with his mouth) – 2:20
3. "Montero (Call Me by Your Name)" (Satan's extended version) – 2:50
4. "Montero (Call Me by Your Name)" (But Lil Nas X is silent the entire time) – 2:48

== Credits and personnel ==
Credits adapted from Jaxsta via Billboard.

- Lil Nas X – songwriter, vocals
- Take a Daytrip – producer
  - Denzel Baptiste – songwriter, recording engineer, background vocals
  - David Biral – songwriter, background vocals
- Omer Fedi – songwriter, producer, guitar
- Roy Lenzo – songwriter, producer, recording engineer
- Şerban Ghenea – mixing engineer
- Chris Gehringer – mastering engineer

== Charts ==
=== Weekly charts ===
Chart performance for "Montero (Call Me by Your Name)"
Chart (2021–2022)	Peak position
Argentina Hot 100 (Billboard)	51
Australia (ARIA)	1
Austria (Ö3 Austria Top 40)	1
Belgium (Ultratop 50 Flanders)	2
Belgium (Ultratop 50 Wallonia)	2
Bolivia Airplay (Monitor Latino)	16
Brazil (UBC)	9
Bulgaria Airplay (PROPHON)	1
Canada Hot 100 (Billboard)	1
Canada CHR/Top 40 (Billboard)	1
Canada Hot AC (Billboard)	32
CIS Airplay (TopHit)	2
Costa Rica Streaming (FONOTICA)	5
Croatia International Airplay (Top lista)	8
Czech Republic Airplay (ČNS IFPI)	76
Czech Republic Singles Digital (ČNS IFPI)	1
Denmark (Tracklisten)	2
Dominican Republic (SodinPro)	46
Euro Digital Song Sales (Billboard)	9
Finland (Suomen virallinen lista)	1
France (SNEP)	1
Germany (GfK)	2
Global 200 (Billboard)	1
Greece International Streaming (IFPI)	1
Hungary (Rádiós Top 40)	12
Hungary (Single Top 40)	3
Hungary (Stream Top 40)	1
Iceland (Tónlistinn)	4
India International Streaming (IMI)	1
Ireland (IRMA)	1
Israel International Airplay (Media Forest)	1
Italy (FIMI)	10
Japan Hot Overseas (Billboard Japan)	9
Lebanon (Lebanese Top 20)	1
Lithuania (AGATA)	1
Malaysia Streaming (RIM)	10
Mexico Airplay (Billboard)	5
Netherlands (Dutch Top 40)	5
Netherlands (Single Top 100)	2
New Zealand (Recorded Music NZ)	2
Norway (VG-lista)	1
Poland Airplay (ZPAV)	30
Portugal (AFP)	1
Romania (Airplay 100)	12
Russia Airplay (TopHit)	2
Singapore (RIAS)	3
Slovakia Airplay (ČNS IFPI)	30
Slovakia Singles Digital (ČNS IFPI)	1
South Africa Streaming (RISA)	6
Spain (Promusicae)	5
Sweden (Sverigetopplistan)	4
Switzerland (Schweizer Hitparade)	2
UK Singles (Official Charts)	1
US Billboard Hot 100	1
US Adult Pop Airplay (Billboard)	17
US Dance Airplay (Billboard)	5
US Pop Airplay (Billboard)	1
US Rhythmic Airplay (Billboard)	2
US Rolling Stone Top 100	1

2023 Weekly chart performance for "Montero (Call Me by Your Name)"
Chart (2023)	Peak position
Moldova Airplay (TopHit)	35

=== Year-end charts ===
2021 year-end chart performance for "Montero (Call Me by Your Name)"
Chart (2021)	Position
Australia (ARIA)	11
Austria (Ö3 Austria Top 40)	8
Belgium (Ultratop Flanders)	18
Belgium (Ultratop Wallonia)	4
Brazil Streaming (Pro-Música Brasil)	42
Canada (Canadian Hot 100)	5
CIS (TopHit)	15
Denmark (Tracklisten)	18
France (SNEP)	5
Germany (Official German Charts)	13
Global 200 (Billboard)	7
Hungary (Single Top 40)	62
Hungary (Stream Top 40)	4
India International Singles (IMI)	5
Ireland (IRMA)	8
Italy (FIMI)	47
Mexico (AMPROFON)	9
Netherlands (Dutch Top 40)	16
Netherlands (Single Top 100)	11
New Zealand (Recorded Music NZ)	15
Norway (VG-lista)	11
Portugal (AFP)	1
Russia Airplay (TopHit)	22
Spain (PROMUSICAE)	39
Sweden (Sverigetopplistan)	29
Switzerland (Schweizer Hitparade)	5
UK Singles (OCC)	5
US Billboard Hot 100	9
US Dance/Mix Show Airplay (Billboard)	14
US Mainstream Top 40 (Billboard)	8
US Rhythmic (Billboard)	16

2022 year-end chart performance for "Montero (Call Me by Your Name)"
Chart (2022)	Position
Australia (ARIA)	94
Belgium (Ultratop 50 Wallonia)	184
Global 200 (Billboard)	85
Russia Airplay (TopHit)	171

2023 year-end chart performance for "Montero (Call Me by Your Name)"
Chart (2023)	Position
Moldova Airplay (TopHit)	108

2025 year-end chart performance for "Montero (Call Me by Your Name)"
Chart (2025)	Position
Moldova Airplay (TopHit)	194

== Certifications ==
Certifications for "Montero (Call Me by Your Name)"
Region	Certification	Certified units/sales
Australia (ARIA)	5× Platinum	350,000^{‡}
Austria (IFPI Austria)	Platinum	30,000^{‡}
Belgium (BRMA)	Gold	20,000^{‡}
Brazil (Pro-Música Brasil)	3× Diamond	480,000^{‡}
Canada (Music Canada)	7× Platinum	560,000^{‡}
Denmark (IFPI Danmark)	Platinum	90,000^{‡}
France (SNEP)	Diamond	333,333^{‡}
Germany (BVMI)	Platinum	600,000^{‡}
Italy (FIMI)	2× Platinum	140,000^{‡}
Mexico (AMPROFON)	3× Platinum	420,000^{‡}
New Zealand (RMNZ)	4× Platinum	120,000^{‡}
Norway (IFPI Norway)	2× Platinum	120,000^{‡}
Poland (ZPAV)	2× Platinum	100,000^{‡}
Portugal (AFP)	5× Platinum	50,000^{‡}
Spain (Promusicae)	3× Platinum	180,000^{‡}
Switzerland (IFPI Switzerland)	3× Platinum	60,000^{‡}
United Kingdom (BPI)	2× Platinum	1,200,000^{‡}
United States (RIAA)	7× Platinum	7,000,000^{‡}
Streaming
Greece (IFPI Greece)	2× Platinum	4,000,000^{†}
Sweden (GLF)	Platinum	8,000,000^{†}
^{‡} Sales+streaming figures based on certification alone.^{†} Streaming-only figures based on certification alone.

== Release history ==
Release dates and formats for "Montero (Call Me by Your Name)"
Region	Date	Format	Version	Label	Ref.
Various	March 26, 2021	Digital download; streaming	Original	Columbia	
United States	March 30, 2021	Rhythmic contemporary radio	Original	Columbia	
Various	March 30, 2021	Digital download; streaming	Extended	Columbia	
Various	March 31, 2021	Digital download; streaming	Instrumental	Columbia	
Italy	April 2, 2021	Radio airplay	Original	Sony Italy	
United States	April 6, 2021	Contemporary hit radio	Original	Columbia	
Various	April 23, 2021	Digital download; streaming	A cappella	Columbia	
Various	April 28, 2021	Digital download; streaming	EP	Columbia	

== See also ==
- List of most-streamed songs on Spotify
- List of Billboard Global 200 number ones of 2021
- List of number-one singles of 2021 (Australia)
- List of number-one urban singles of 2021 (Australia)
- List of top 10 singles for 2021 in Australia
- List of number-one hits of 2021 (Austria)
- List of Canadian Hot 100 number-one singles of 2021
- List of number-one singles of 2021 (Finland)
- List of number-one hits of 2021 (France)
- List of top 10 singles in 2021 (France)
- List of number-one singles of 2021 (Ireland)
- List of top 10 singles in 2021 (Ireland)
- List of number-one songs in Norway
- List of number-one singles of 2021 (Portugal)
- List of number-one songs in 2021 (Turkey)
- List of UK Singles Chart number ones of the 2020s
- List of UK top-ten singles in 2021
- List of Official Audio Streaming Chart number ones of the 2020s
- List of Billboard Digital Song Sales number ones of 2021
- List of Billboard Hot 100 number-one singles of the 2020s
  - List of Billboard Hot 100 number ones of 2021
- List of Billboard Hot 100 top-ten singles in 2021
- List of Billboard Streaming Songs number ones of 2021
- List of Rolling Stone Top 100 number-one songs of 2021
