= Jordan Dodson =

New Zealand screenwriter and film director

- Born: December 10, 1987 (age 38)
- Died: New Zealand
- Occupations: Screen writer, film director

Jordan Dodson (born 10 December 1987) is a New Zealand screenwriter and film director, based in Auckland. Jordan creates music videos and commercials as THUNDERLIPS, a directing-duo with Sean Wallace.

== Career ==
Dodson spent his teenage years directing extreme sports videos in Switzerland, and after working as a Make Up Artist on Roland Emmerich's 10,000BC, and an Assistant Editor on Andrew Adamson's The Chronicles of Narnia: Prince Caspian, Dodson returned to New Zealand in 2005, and has since written and co-written several feature films, and directed many short films, music videos and television commercials.

In 2012 Dodson's short film Runaways, made in association with the New Zealand Film Commission and Candlelit Pictures Ltd, premiered in competition at the Montreal World Film Festival, and went on to play at the AFI Fest in Los Angeles in 2012. Runaways was shot on left-over 35mm film stock from the feature film Trade.

Dodson is a member of the Screen Directors Guild of New Zealand (SDGNZ). He works on films and music videos with Auckland-based production company Candlelit Pictures.

== Filmography ==
Year	Title	Role	Notes
2012	Runaways	Writer, Director	Short Film, Montreal World Film Festival (Canada) 2012, AFI Fest (USA) 2012, Dallas International Film Festival (USA) 2013
2011	Andy	Director	Short Film, Brantford Film Festival (Canada) 2012, Show Me Shorts Film Festival (New Zealand) 2012, Portland Maine Film Festival (USA) 2012
2011	Cheap Tuesday	Director	Short Film, Brantford Film Festival (Canada) 2012, Portland Maine Film Festival (USA) 2012
2010	Lost Call	Director	Short Film for V48 Hours Film Competition NZ, nominated for Best Cinematography and won Best Actress
2008	The Junkyard	Director	Short Film
2008	The Statue	Director	Short Film, starring Robert Hoffman III
2008	Two or More	Director	Short Film funded by Filmaka.com
2008	We All Fall Together	Director	Short Film
