= List of Billboard Hot 100 number ones of 2021 =

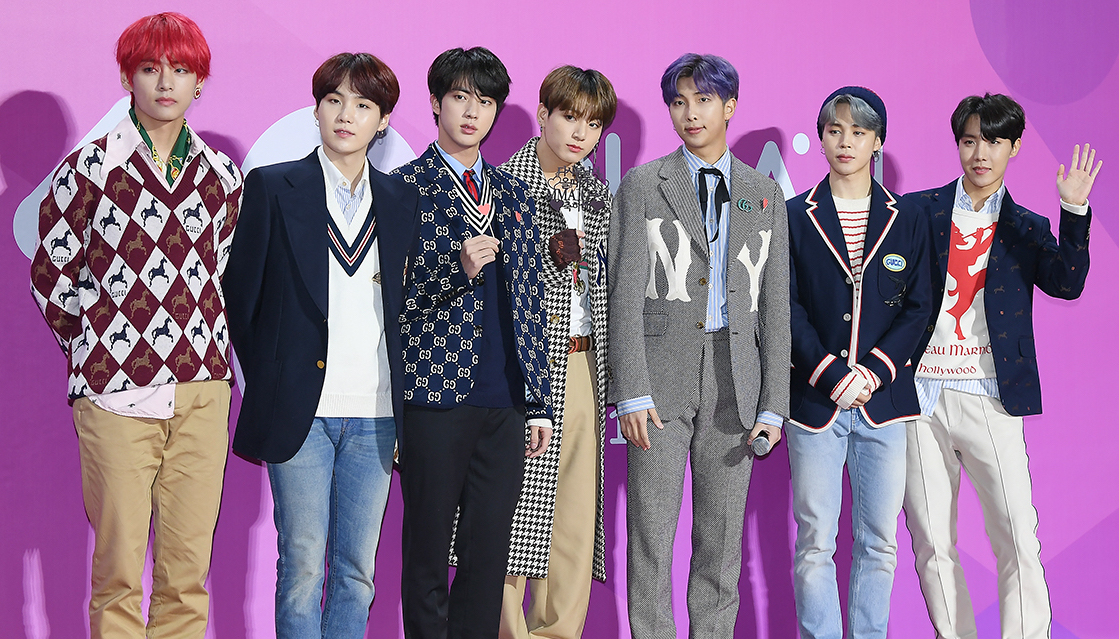
South Korean boy band BTS topped the Hot 100 for 12 non-consecutive weeks, aided by three number-one debuts: "Butter", "Permission to Dance" and the Coldplay collaboration "My Universe".

This is a list of the songs placed number one in the United States during 2021. The Billboard Hot 100 is a chart that ranks the best-performing songs in the United States. Its data is compiled by MRC Data and published by American music magazine Billboard. The chart is based on each song's weekly physical and digital sales collectively, the amount of airplay it receives on American radio stations, and its streams on online digital music platforms.

Twenty-four acts reached number one in 2021, nine of whom earned their first number-one single: Olivia Rodrigo, Daniel Caesar, Giveon, Silk Sonic, Anderson .Paak, Polo G, The Kid Laroi, Future, and Jack Harlow. BTS scored three number ones while Rodrigo, Justin Bieber, Drake and Lil Nas X scored two each, as the only acts to achieve multiple number-one songs in 2021.

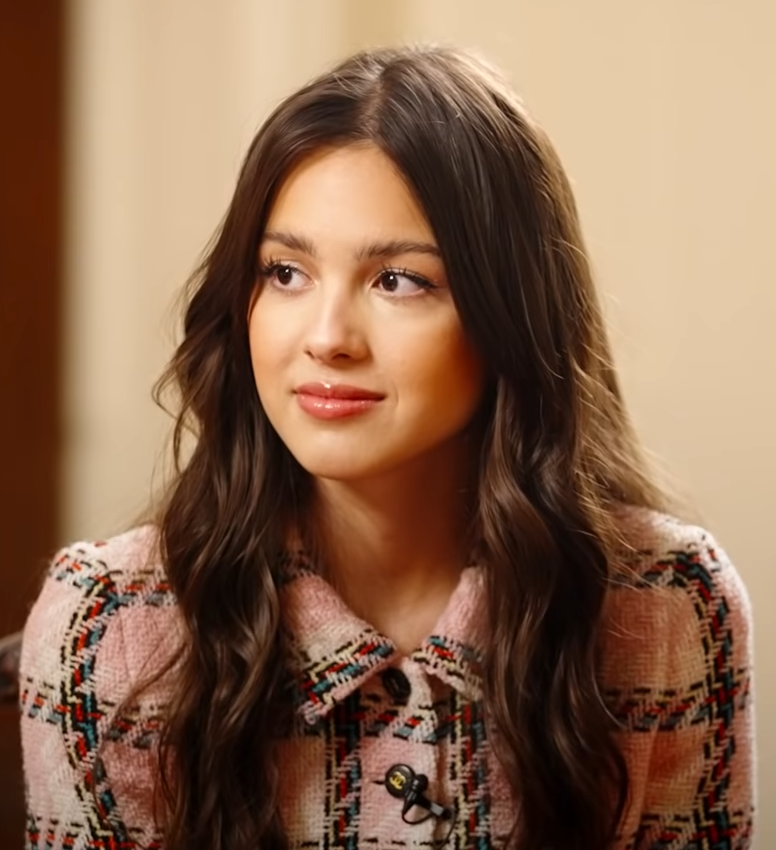
American singer Olivia Rodrigo reigned atop the chart for nine weeks, with two singles that debuted at number-one, "Drivers License" and "Good 4 U", both from her debut studio album, Sour.

2021 marked the first calendar year since 1991 to have at least 10 songs reach number one on the Hot 100 by the end of May. BTS spent the most weeks at the top spot of the Hot 100 in 2021, with twelve non-consecutive weeks. Their single "Butter" is the longest running number-one song of 2021, spending ten weeks atop the chart. (Adele's "Easy On Me" also spent ten weeks total at number one, but only seven of them occurred in 2021.) Rodrigo's "Drivers License" was 2021's longest running number-one single by a female artist, with eight consecutive weeks atop. Taylor Swift scored her career's eighth number-one song with "All Too Well (Taylor's Version)", which broke the 49-year-old Hot 100 record of Don McLean's "American Pie" (1972) to become the longest song of all time to top the chart, clocking at 10 minutes and 13 seconds. Topping the chart for the first time with a feature on Drake's "Way 2 Sexy", Future broke the record for the longest wait for a #1, after 125 entries on the chart.

== Chart history ==
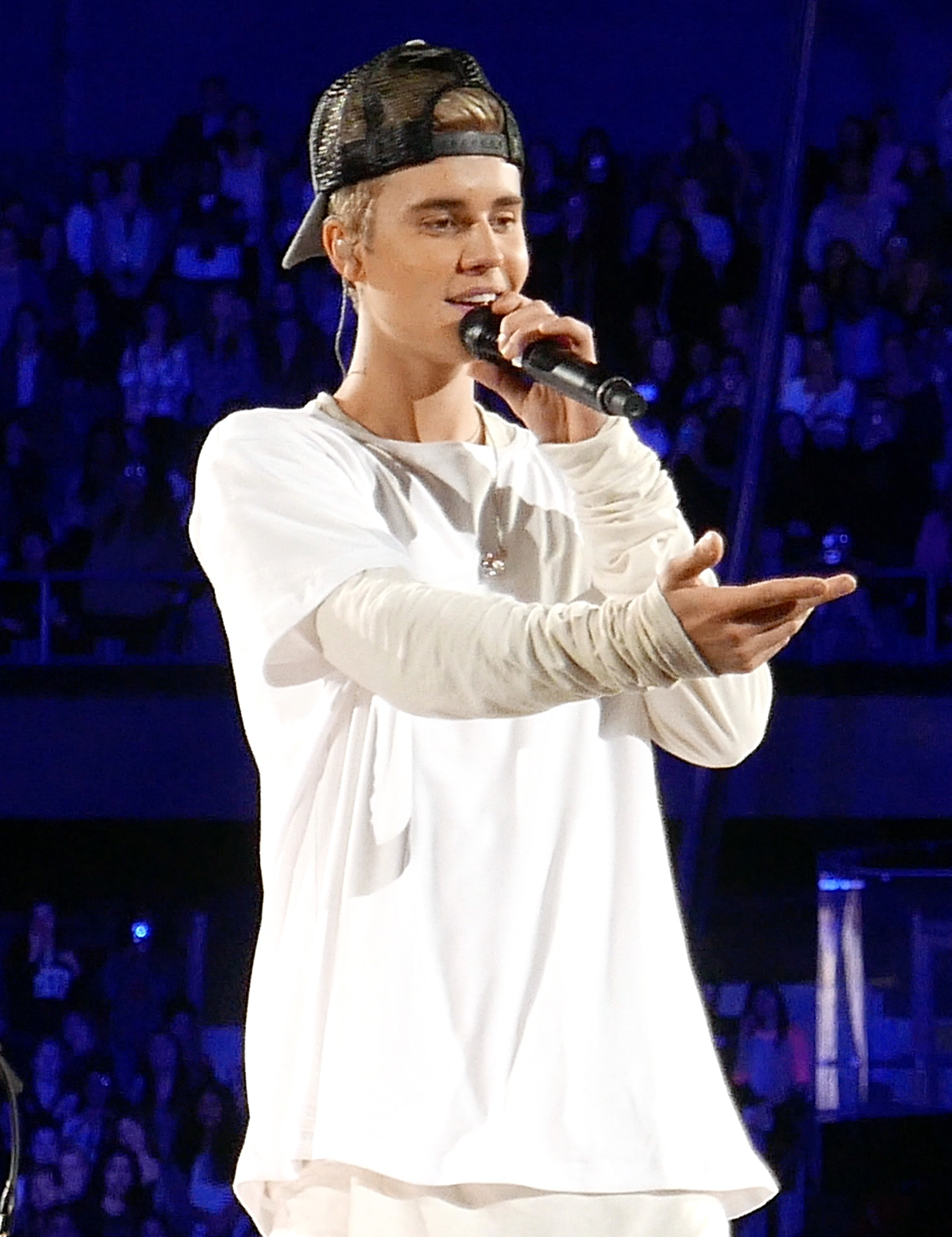
Canadian singer Justin Bieber topped the chart for eight weeks, aided by "Peaches" and the Kid Laroi collaboration "Stay".

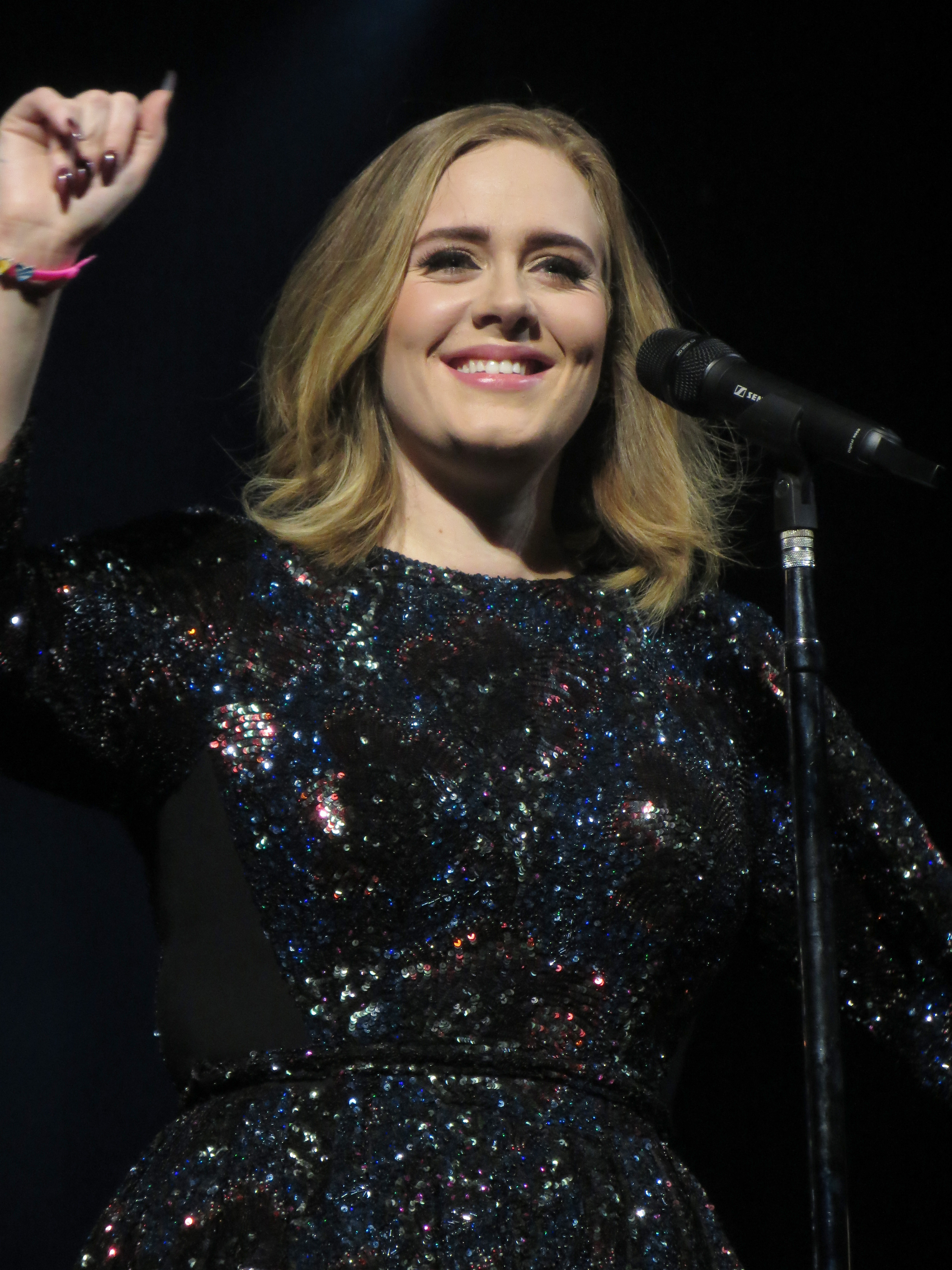
"Easy on Me" by English singer Adele, her first single in nearly six years, topped the chart for ten weeks total, seven of them in 2021.

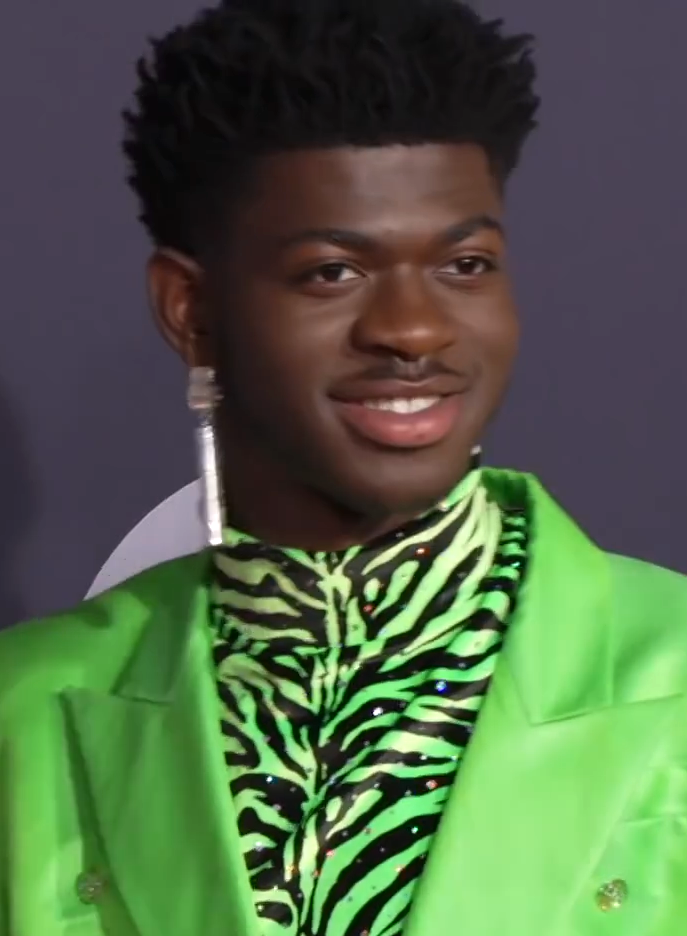
American rapper Lil Nas X scored two number-one singles with "Montero (Call Me by Your Name)" and "Industry Baby"; both from his debut album, Montero.

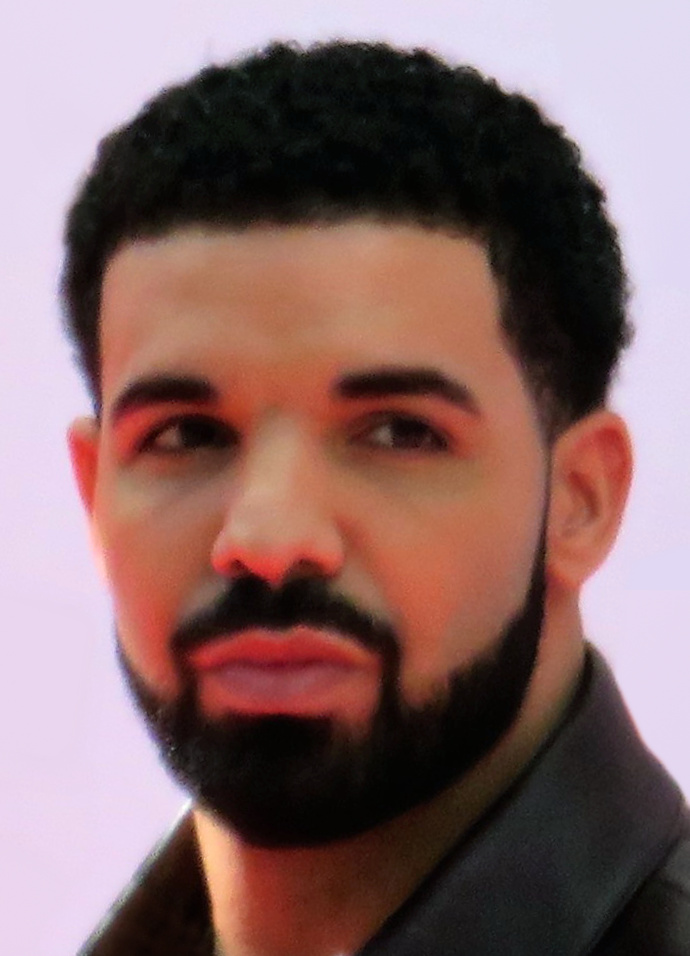
"What's Next" and "Way 2 Sexy" by Canadian rapper Drake charted atop the Hot 100 for one week each.

The best-performing single of 2021, "Levitating" by Dua Lipa, peaked at number two on the Hot 100 chart dated May 22, 2021.

No.	Issue date	Song	Artist(s)	Ref.
re	January 2	"All I Want for Christmas Is You"	Mariah Carey	
re	January 9	"Mood"	24kGoldn featuring Iann Dior	
re	January 16	"Mood"	24kGoldn featuring Iann Dior	
1116	January 23	"Drivers License"	Olivia Rodrigo	
1116	January 30	"Drivers License"	Olivia Rodrigo	
1116	February 6	"Drivers License"	Olivia Rodrigo	
1116	February 13	"Drivers License"	Olivia Rodrigo	
1116	February 20	"Drivers License"	Olivia Rodrigo	
1116	February 27	"Drivers License"	Olivia Rodrigo	
1116	March 6	"Drivers License"	Olivia Rodrigo	
1116	March 13	"Drivers License"	Olivia Rodrigo	
1117	March 20	"What's Next"	Drake	
1118	March 27	"Up"	Cardi B	
1119	April 3	"Peaches"	Justin Bieber featuring Daniel Caesar and Giveon	
1120	April 10	"Montero (Call Me by Your Name)"	Lil Nas X	
1121	April 17	"Leave the Door Open"	Silk Sonic (Bruno Mars and Anderson .Paak) (Note: Silk Sonic is a duo consisting of American singers Bruno Mars and Anderson .Paak, both of whom are also credited individually for the song on the Billboard charts.)	
1122	April 24	"Rapstar"	Polo G	
1122	May 1	"Rapstar"	Polo G	
1123	May 8	"Save Your Tears"	The Weeknd and Ariana Grande	
1123	May 15	"Save Your Tears"	The Weeknd and Ariana Grande	
re	May 22	"Leave the Door Open"	Silk Sonic (Bruno Mars and Anderson .Paak)	
1124	May 29	"Good 4 U"	Olivia Rodrigo	
1125	June 5	"Butter"	BTS	
1125	June 12	"Butter"	BTS	
1125	June 19	"Butter"	BTS	
1125	June 26	"Butter"	BTS	
1125	July 3	"Butter"	BTS	
1125	July 10	"Butter"	BTS	
1125	July 17	"Butter"	BTS	
1126	July 24	"Permission to Dance"	BTS	
re	July 31	"Butter"	BTS	
re	August 7	"Butter"	BTS	
1127	August 14	"Stay"	The Kid Laroi and Justin Bieber	
1127	August 21	"Stay"	The Kid Laroi and Justin Bieber	
1127	August 28	"Stay"	The Kid Laroi and Justin Bieber	
1127	September 4	"Stay"	The Kid Laroi and Justin Bieber	
re	September 11	"Butter"	BTS	
1128	September 18	"Way 2 Sexy"	Drake featuring Future and Young Thug	
re	September 25	"Stay"	The Kid Laroi and Justin Bieber	
re	October 2	"Stay"	The Kid Laroi and Justin Bieber	
1129	October 9	"My Universe"	Coldplay and BTS	
re	October 16	"Stay"	The Kid Laroi and Justin Bieber	
1130	October 23	"Industry Baby"	Lil Nas X and Jack Harlow	
1131	October 30	"Easy on Me"	Adele	
1131	November 6	"Easy on Me"	Adele	
1131	November 13	"Easy on Me"	Adele	
1131	November 20	"Easy on Me"	Adele	
1132	November 27	"All Too Well (Taylor's Version)"	Taylor Swift	
re	December 4	"Easy on Me"	Adele	
re	December 11	"Easy on Me"	Adele	
re	December 18	"Easy on Me"	Adele	
re	December 25	"All I Want for Christmas Is You"	Mariah Carey	

== Number-one artists ==
List of number-one artists by total weeks at number one
Position	Artist	Weeks at No. 1
1	BTS	12
2	Olivia Rodrigo	9
3	Justin Bieber	8
4	The Kid Laroi	7
4	Adele	7
6	Mariah Carey	2
6	24kGoldn	2
6	Iann Dior	2
6	Drake	2
6	Lil Nas X	2
6	Silk Sonic	2
6	Bruno Mars	2
6	Anderson .Paak	2
6	Polo G	2
6	The Weeknd	2
6	Ariana Grande	2
17	Cardi B	1
17	Daniel Caesar	1
17	Giveon	1
17	Future	1
17	Young Thug	1
17	Coldplay	1
17	Jack Harlow	1
17	Taylor Swift	1

== See also ==
- List of Billboard 200 number-one albums of 2021
- List of Billboard Global 200 number ones of 2021
- List of Billboard Hot 100 top-ten singles in 2021
- List of Billboard Hot 100 number-one singles of the 2020s
- Billboard Year-End Hot 100 singles of 2021
- 2021 in American music
