= Late to the Party =

Late to the Party may refer to:

- "Late to the Party", song by Kacey Musgraves from Pageant Material
- "Late to the Party", song by Joyner Lucas and Ty Dolla Sign
- "Late to the Party", song by Griffen Palmer from Unlearn
- "Late to the Party", episode of The L Word: Generation Q
- "Late to the Party", song by Orla Gartland off Everybody Needs A Hero

== See also ==
- "Late to da Party", song by Lil Nas X and YoungBoy Never Broke Again
