= Holiday (Lil Nas X song) =

2020 single by Lil Nas X

Single by Lil Nas X
- Released: November 13, 2020
- Recorded: June 27, 2020
- Length: 2:35
- Label: Columbia
- Songwriters: Montero Hill; Brytavious Chambers; David Biral; Denzel Baptiste; Jocelyn Donald; Tyler Brooks
- Producers: Tay Keith; Take a Daytrip

Lil Nas X singles chronology
"Rodeo (Remix)" (2020)	"Holiday" (2020)	"Montero (Call Me by Your Name)" (2021)

Music video
- "Holiday" on YouTube

"Holiday" (stylized in all caps) is a song by American rapper Lil Nas X. The song was produced by producer duo Take A Daytrip and late producer Tay Keith. It was released on November 13, 2020, through Columbia Records, as a standalone single. A preview of the song, titled "The Origins of Holiday", was released on November 8. It is a Christmas-themed song, described as a stopgap single between his debut EP 7 and follow-up single "Montero (Call Me by Your Name)".

== Music videos ==
=== "The Origins of Holiday" (trailer) ===
The music video for "The Origins of Holiday" trailer was directed by Jason Koenig, and produced by Ron Perry, Saul Levitz, Bridgitte Pugh. It has Lil Nas X overtaking the identity of Santa Claus, in a fashion similar to Tim Allen's character in the 1994 film The Santa Clause, and features Michael J. Fox as the character of Marty McFly from the Back to the Future film series.

=== "Holiday" ===
The music video for "Holiday" was directed by Gibson Hazard and Lil Nas X, and features Lil Nas X as a futuristic Santa Claus in his workshop on December 24, 2020.

== Promotion ==
On November 10, 2020, Roblox announced the "Lil Nas X Concert Experience", that began on November 14, 2020, at 1pm PST. The concert was used to promote the single, with Lil Nas X singing a variety of his popular songs through a large avatar. The event was widely considered a success, with it receiving over 33 million views and is Roblox's most popular concert with nearly 1 million concurrent viewers.

== Charts ==
=== Weekly charts ===
Weekly chart performance for "Holiday"
Chart (2020–2021)	Peak position
Australia (ARIA)	42
Austria (Ö3 Austria Top 40)	13
Belgium (Ultratop 50 Flanders)	9
Belgium (Ultratop 50 Wallonia)	16
Canada Hot 100 (Billboard)	26
Canada CHR/Top 40 (Billboard)	42
Czech Republic Singles Digital (ČNS IFPI)	16
Finland (Suomen virallinen lista)	7
France (SNEP)	70
Germany (GfK)	29
Global 200 (Billboard)	37
Greece (IFPI)	10
Hungary (Single Top 40)	20
Hungary (Stream Top 40)	4
Iceland (Tónlistinn)	10
Ireland (IRMA)	18
Lithuania (AGATA)	3
Netherlands (Single Top 100)	39
New Zealand Hot Singles (RMNZ)	10
Norway (VG-lista)	10
Portugal (AFP)	36
Slovakia Singles Digital (ČNS IFPI)	15
Sweden (Sverigetopplistan)	60
Switzerland (Schweizer Hitparade)	26
UK Singles (Official Charts)	23
US Billboard Hot 100	37
US Hot R&B/Hip-Hop Songs (Billboard)	11
US R&B/Hip-Hop Airplay (Billboard)	46
US Pop Airplay (Billboard)	25
US Rhythmic Airplay (Billboard)	12

=== Year-end charts ===
2020 year-end chart performance for "Holiday"
Chart (2020)	Position
Hungary (Stream Top 40)	70

2021 year-end chart performance for "Holiday"
Chart (2021)	Position
Belgium (Ultratop Flanders)	100
Belgium (Ultratop Wallonia)	94
Global 200 (Billboard)	189
Hungary (Stream Top 40)	74
Iceland (Tónlistinn)	98
Portugal (AFP)	101
US Hot R&B/Hip-Hop Songs (Billboard)	51

== Certifications ==
Region	Certification	Certified units/sales
Australia (ARIA)	Platinum	70,000^{‡}
Belgium (BRMA)	Gold	20,000^{‡}
Brazil (Pro-Música Brasil)	Diamond	160,000^{‡}
Canada (Music Canada)	Gold	40,000^{‡}
Denmark (IFPI Danmark)	Gold	45,000^{‡}
France (SNEP)	Gold	100,000^{‡}
Germany (BVMI)	Gold	200,000^{‡}
New Zealand (RMNZ)	Platinum	30,000^{‡}
Norway (IFPI Norway)	Platinum	60,000^{‡}
Poland (ZPAV)	Gold	10,000^{‡}
Portugal (AFP)	Platinum	10,000^{‡}
Switzerland (IFPI Switzerland)	Gold	10,000^{‡}
United Kingdom (BPI)	Silver	200,000^{‡}
United States (RIAA)	2× Platinum	2,000,000^{‡}
Streaming
Greece (IFPI Greece)	Gold	1,000,000^{†}
Sweden (GLF)	Gold	4,000,000^{†}
^{‡} Sales+streaming figures based on certification alone.^{†} Streaming-only figures based on certification alone.

== Release history ==
Release dates and formats for "Holiday"
Region	Date	Format	Label	Ref.
Various	November 13, 2020	Digital download; streaming	Columbia	
United States	November 17, 2020	Contemporary hit radio	Columbia	
United States	November 17, 2020	Rhythmic radio	Columbia	
Italy	November 20, 2020	Radio airplay	Columbia	
United States	January 18, 2021	Hot adult contemporary radio	Columbia	
