= Say What You Will =

Say What You Will may refer to:

- "Say What You Will", a song by For the Fallen Dreams from their 2011 album Back Burner
- "Say What You Will", a song by Fastway from their 1983 album Fastway
- "Say What You Will", a song by the Canadian singer Justin Hines
- "Say What You Will", a song by Sleep Token from their 2019 album Sundowning
- "Say What You Will", a song by James Blake from his 2021 album Friends That Break Your Heart
- Say What You Will, Clarence... Karl Sold the Truck (originally titled Say What You Will...), a 1984 debut studio album by American rock band Soul Asylum.
