= You Like =

You Like may refer to:

- "C7osure (You Like)", a song by Lil Nas X
- "You Like", a song by Chris Brown from his album Heartbreak on a Full Moon
