= Rodeo (Lil Nas X and Cardi B song) =

2019 song by Lil Nas X and Cardi B

Song by Lil Nas X and Cardi B

from the EP 7
- Released: June 21, 2019
- Genre: Hip hop; country trap
- Length: 2:39
- Label: Columbia
- Songwriters: Montero Hill; Belcalis Almánzar; David Biral; Denzel Baptiste; Pardison Fontaine; Michael Dean; Roy Lenzo; Russ Chell; Ann Wilson; Michael Derosier; Nancy Wilson; Roger Fisher
- Producers: Take a Daytrip; Chell; Lenzo

"Rodeo" is a song by American rappers Lil Nas X and Cardi B from the former's second EP, 7 (2019). The song was written by Lil Nas X and Cardi B themselves, alongside Pardison Fontaine and producers Take a Daytrip, Roy Lenzo, and Russ Chell. Due to the song's interpolation of Heart's 1977 single "Barracuda," band members Ann Wilson, Nancy Wilson, Michael Derosier, and Roger Fisher are also credited as songwriters. Musically, the song is a country trap track with a surf trumpet and reverberated staccato guitar riff. Upon the release of 7 on the 21st of June, 2019, the song received generally positive reviews from music critics, who praised Cardi B's verse.

"Rodeo" debuted at number 22 on the US Billboard Hot 100, and reached charts in numerous other territories. Lil Nas X and Cardi B, among others, were sued by Don Lee and Glen Keith DeMeritt III, with the two of them claiming that "Rodeo" plagiarized a track they produced called "Broad Day" (2017). A remix of the former with Lil Nas X and fellow rapper Nas was released for digital download and streaming as a single on January 27, 2020, after a live performance by Lil Nas X and Nas of the remix during the 2020 Grammy Awards the previous day. It was supported by a music video and caused the song to re-enter the Billboard Hot 100 at number 74, with the magazine billing the performer as "Lil Nas X featuring Cardi B or Nas".

== Background and composition ==
According to Take a Daytrip, the duo of David Biral and Denzel Baptiste, the guitar lick for "Rodeo" was introduced during Lil Nas X's first studio session ever. The song's chorus was the first part the three of them completed, which was posted to Lil Nas X's Instagram before the rest of the song was finished, and had received around three million views within two days. A solo version of it was completed one month and a half later in New York City. Cardi B's verse was a late addition to "Rodeo", which Lil Nas X texted to the producers when they "were in the studio working on something else" a few days prior. The song was written by Lil Nas X and Cardi B, alongside Pardison Fontaine, Roy Lenzo, Russ Chell, Biral, and Baptiste, while the latter four produced the song.

Lil Nas X revealed the song's name as part of the tracklist for 7. Cardi B's appearance on it was not announced until the EP's release on June 21, 2019. A hip hop song, "Rodeo" retains Lil Nas X's "country trap style with twanging guitars" according to Spin's Nina Braca. The song samples a guitar riff, described by Uproxx's Aaron Williams as "a harder rock-oriented loop" similar to Heart's "Barracuda" (1977), featuring Lil Nas X's country trap vocals, which Williams thought were "to censure a romantic flame for her dependence on his largesse". It includes a reverbed staccato guitar riff and surf trumpet. With "twisted, brooding Mariachi tones", "Rodeo" has a hint of guitar-and-drum driven heaviness.

== Critical reception ==
Upon its release, "Rodeo" was met with generally positive reviews from music critics. Pitchfork's Alphonse Pierre wrote that "'Rodeo' hits all the beats of 'Mo Bamba'" (2017), describing the former as "a desperate return to the bulletproof cowboy persona". Nina Braca from Spin labelled Cardi B's verse "energetic". NPR's Meaghan Garvey called the song "an outlaw banger", noting that it sees Lil Nas X's "cartoon cowboy drawl" return. In a review for AllMusic, Fred Thomas wrote that the song gets closest to the "trappy country" formula, with Lil Nas X "affecting his rugged cowboy persona over a banging beat, complete with a dusty drawl and a burning feature from Cardi B". Garrett Gravley of Consequence of Sound compared the quality of the backing instrumentals of "Rodeo" to Dick Dale, adding that it "leave[s] a void in the listener that can only be filled by playing [it] again and again". Rolling Stone's Spanos described the song as a "surefire hit". In a mixed review, Erika Marie of HotNewHipHop thought that the song "brings more of a hip hop vibe with Cardi's aggressive rap addition, but with only two verses, there's much to be left for listeners".

=== Copyright claim ===
Don Lee and Glen Keith DeMeritt III sued Lil Nas X, Cardi B, Take a Daytrip, Unxque and Sony Music Entertainment for allegedly plagiarizing "Rodeo" from a song they produced called "Broad Day" (2017). Lee and DeMeritt stated that the former uses the E, F, G, F, E chord progression of the song and features similar instrumentation to it; they also alleged that the song was "performed, published, and distributed widely, including without limitation in and around the Atlanta hip-hop scene". Lil Nas X denied the claims and said that "the work, 'Rodeo,' was created independently from and without knowledge of the allegedly infringed work".

== Commercial performance ==
"Rodeo" debuted at number 22 on the US Billboard Hot 100 for the issue date of July 6, 2019, following the release of 7. The track was later certified triple platinum by the Recording Industry Association of America (RIAA) for shipments of three million certified units on July 19, 2024. In Canada, it peaked at number 44 on the Canadian Hot 100 and attained a double platinum certification from Music Canada (MC). The track charted at number 55 on the UK Singles Chart, number 35 on the Irish Singles Chart and number 13 on Latvia's Mūzikas Patēriņa Tops chart. The song peaked at number 72 on the ARIA Singles chart and number six on the New Zealand Hot Singles chart, an extension to the New Zealand Top 40 Singles chart.

== Credits and personnel ==
Credits adapted from Tidal.

- Lil Nas X – lead vocals, songwriting
- Cardi B – lead vocals, songwriting
- Roy Lenzo – songwriting, production
- Russ Chell – songwriting, production
- Take a Daytrip – songwriting, production
- Jorden Thorpe – songwriting
- Ann Wilson - songwriting
- Michael Derosier - songwriting
- Nancy Wilson - songwriting
- Roger Fisher - songwriting
- Denzel Baptiste – recording
- DJ Swivel – mixing
- Colin Leonard – mastering

== Charts ==
=== Weekly charts ===
| Chart (2019) | Peak position |
|---|---|
| Australia (ARIA) | 72 |
| Canada Hot 100 (Billboard) | 44 |
| Czech Republic Singles Digital (ČNS IFPI) | 56 |
| Estonia (Eesti Ekspress) | 19 |
| France (SNEP) | 111 |
| Greece (IFPI) | 12 |
| Hungary (Stream Top 40) | 29 |
| Ireland (IRMA) | 35 |
| Latvia (LAIPA) | 13 |
| Lithuania (AGATA) | 17 |
| New Zealand Hot Singles (RMNZ) | 6 |
| Portugal (AFP) | 37 |
| Slovakia Singles Digital (ČNS IFPI) | 35 |
| Sweden Heatseekers (Sverigetopplistan) | 16 |
| Switzerland (Schweizer Hitparade) | 82 |
| UK Singles (Official Charts) | 55 |
| UK Hip Hop/R&B (Official Charts) | 29 |
| US Billboard Hot 100 | 22 |
| US Hot R&B/Hip-Hop Songs (Billboard) | 12 |
| US Rolling Stone Top 100 | 9 |

=== Year-end charts ===
| Chart (2019) | Position |
|---|---|
| US Hot R&B/Hip-Hop Songs (Billboard) | 92 |

== Certifications ==
| Region | Certification | Certified units/sales |
|---|---|---|
| Australia (ARIA) | Gold | 35,000^{‡} |
| Brazil (Pro-Música Brasil) | 3× Platinum | 120,000^{‡} |
| Canada (Music Canada) | 2× Platinum | 160,000^{‡} |
| France (SNEP) | Gold | 100,000^{‡} |
| New Zealand (RMNZ) | Gold | 15,000^{‡} |
| Poland (ZPAV) | Gold | 10,000^{‡} |
| United Kingdom (BPI) | Silver | 200,000^{‡} |
| United States (RIAA) | 3× Platinum | 3,000,000^{‡} |
^{‡} Sales+streaming figures based on certification alone.

== Remix ==
"Rodeo (Remix)"

Single by Lil Nas X and Nas
- Released: January 27, 2020
- Genre: Alternative Hip hop; country trap
- Length: 2:25
- Label: Columbia
- Songwriters: Montero Hill; Nasir Jones; David Biral; Denzel Baptiste; Michael Dean; Roy Lenzo; Russ Chell
- Producers: Take a Daytrip; Chell; Lenzo

Lil Nas X singles chronology
| "Panini" (2019) | "Rodeo (Remix)" (2020) | "Holiday" (2020) |

Nas singles chronology
| "NY Se Mumbai" (2019) | "Rodeo (Remix)" (2020) | "Ultra Black" (2020) |

Music video
- "Rodeo (ft. Nas)" on YouTube

Lyric video
- "Rodeo (Remix) (feat. Nas)" on YouTube

A remix of "Rodeo" by Lil Nas X and fellow rapper Nas was released for digital download and streaming in various countries on January 27, 2020, accompanied by an animated lyric video. Lil Nas X said of the collaboration that it was "amazing" for Nas to acknowledge him. The remix was serviced as a single to contemporary hit radio in Italy on January 31, 2020. Nas' verse features him rapping about his "ho stable" and major catalog. Stereogum's Tom Breihan called it just as catchy as the original version, stating that the remix adds mariachi horns to its rumbling surf-guitar beat. Lil Nas X performed the former alongside Nas at the 62nd Annual Grammy Awards a day before its digital release.

=== Chart performance ===
The remix reached number 29 on Belgium's Ultratip Bubbling Under Flanders chart and peaked at number 16 on the country's Ultratip Bubbling Under Wallonia chart. It charted at number 27 on the New Zealand Hot Singles chart and number 74 on the US Billboard Hot 100, with the magazine billing the artist as "Lil Nas X featuring Cardi B or Nas". It would additionally chart at number 25 on the US Rhythmic Airplay chart.

=== Music video ===
On February 4, 2020, Lil Nas X revealed that the music video for "Rodeo" will be released the following day, along with a selfie of him as a vampire with red dilated pupils and pointy ears from the shoot. The former was directed by Bradley & Pablo and released for the remix of the song. The video begins with Lil Nas X receiving a phone call about playing a game, following which he is bitten by a vampire and begins to evolve. Lil Nas X is then thrown into the matrix, where Nas shows up in a leather jacket and sunglasses. He offers the former a choice between two pills, who chooses the red pill over the blue one and unlocks his superpowers. About Cardi B's absence from the visual, Lil Nas X stated that she could not appear because of timing conflicts.

Trey Alston of MTV News called it "fully outrageous" and "the music video of your dreams". He added that the "weird" video is "one of the most wickedly original things you'll see". According to Consequence of Sound's Ben Kaye, the visuals continue Lil Nas X's "penchant for genre-specific visuals" and "scare up some vampire horror", but the video cannot decide if it wants to be The Lost Boys, Blade or The Matrix. Writing for Teen Vogue, Sara Delgado stated that the music video is a "cinematic masterpiece" and a "pop culture references galore".

=== Charts ===
| Chart (2020) | Peak position |
|---|---|
| Belgium (Ultratip Bubbling Under Flanders) | 29 |
| Belgium (Ultratip Bubbling Under Wallonia) | 16 |
| New Zealand Hot Singles (RMNZ) | 27 |
| US Billboard Hot 100 | 74 |
| US Rhythmic Airplay (Billboard) | 25 |

=== Release history ===
| Region | Date | Format | Label | Ref. |
|---|---|---|---|---|
| Various | January 27, 2020 | Digital download | Columbia | |
| Various | January 27, 2020 | Streaming | Columbia | |
| Italy | January 31, 2020 | Contemporary hit radio | Sony Music Italy | |
| Canada | February 3, 2020 | Contemporary hit radio | Sony Music Canada | |
