= Friends That Break Your Heart =

Studio album by James Blake
- Released: 8 October 2021
- Studios: The Green Building (Los Angeles, California); No Idle Campus (Los Angeles, California)
- Length: 43:42
- Labels: Republic; Polydor
- Producers: Dominic Maker; Frank Dukes; James Blake; Joji; Khushi; Metro Boomin; Rick Nowels; Take a Daytrip

James Blake chronology
Covers (2020)	Friends That Break Your Heart (2021)	Wind Down (2022)

Singles from Friends That Break Your Heart
- 1. "Say What You Will" Released: 22 July 2021; 2. "Life Is Not the Same" Released: 20 August 2021; 3. "Famous Last Words" Released: 13 September 2021

Friends That Break Your Heart is the fifth studio album by English singer-songwriter James Blake. It was released by Republic and Polydor Records on 8 October 2021, after initially being scheduled for release on 10 September 2021 before being postponed due to delays in physical production as a result of the COVID-19 pandemic.

== Promotion and release ==
James Blake announced Friends That Break Your Heart on 22 July 2021, and it was scheduled for release on 10 September 2021. "Say What You Will" was released as the album's lead single on the same day. "Life Is Not the Same" was released as the second single on 20 August 2021. On 3 September 2021, Blake announced the album was postponed due to delays in physical production as a result of the COVID-19 pandemic and would be released on 8 October 2021. "Famous Last Words" was released as the third single on 13 September 2021.

== Critical reception ==
Friends That Break Your Heart ratings
Aggregate scores
Source	Rating
AnyDecentMusic?	7.3/10
Metacritic	79/100
Review scores
Source	Rating
AllMusic	3.5/5 stars
Clash	8/10
DIY	4.5/5 stars
Exclaim!	7/10
Financial Times	4/5 stars
The Independent	4/5 stars
NME	5/5 stars
The Observer	4/5 stars
Pitchfork	6.6/10
Uncut	7/10

Friends That Break Your Heart was met with generally positive reviews. At Metacritic, which assigns a rating out of 100 to reviews from professional publications, the album received a weighted average score of 79, based on 15 reviews. Aggregator AnyDecentMusic? gave it 7.3 out of 10, based on their assessment of the critical consensus.

Ella Kemp of NME praised the album, stating, "Familiar emotionally yet revelatory in its execution, the album sees Blake sing about mundane, almost incidental upsets that sting harder than they should. Piercing lyrics are matched by innovative, fearless production". Ben Tipple of DIY said, "His shifts in sound are as delicate as his music, continuing to showcase his ability to blur styles with unparalleled precision". Helen Brown from The Independent enjoyed the album, saying, "Few artists can make such heartbreak sound so pretty, while still reflecting on all its weirdness and complexity". The Observer's Kitty Empire wrote, "Many affecting tracks detail the sharknado of outrage and bewilderment in Blake's trademark delicate soprano, offset occasionally by well-chosen collaborators (SZA, or rappers JID and SwaVay) or startlingly pitch-shifted vocals". Nathan Evans of Clash gave a positive review, stating, "The LP's home stretch is up there with Blake's best, not just in the tense penultimate title track and wet-cheeked closer "If I'm Insecure", but on the lead single. "Say What You Will" shows off the magic trick Blake's perfected by now. Vocally, he's unsettlingly beautiful".

Reviewing the album for AllMusic, Fred Thomas stated, "Even though Friends That Break Your Heart travels a winding path from experimental rap tracks to the tender balladry that makes up the majority of its final quarter, it's still one of the more accessible, and occasionally predictable, collections of material from Blake". Peter Boulos of Exclaim! said, "It does occasionally err too heavily towards swaying ballad tropes, but importantly Blake never hides his feelings through allegory or metaphor, nor does he mangle his vocal delivery with electronic trickery". Pitchfork critic Shaad D'Souza said, "Even if the music remains more ambitious than that aspiration, perhaps the most groundbreaking thing about Friends That Break Your Heart is that James Blake has never sounded so safe". Writing for Uncut, John Lewis stated, "Blake's fragmented post-dubstep has always had an air of bleak melancholy, but nothing he's done has been quite as self-consciously miserable as this".

=== Year-end lists ===
Select year-end rankings of Friends That Break Your Heart
Critic/Publication	List	Rank	Ref.
Clash	Clash Albums of the Year 2021	60	
Complex	The Best Albums of 2021	33	
Complex UK	Complex UK's Best Albums of 2021	11	
The Independent	The 40 Best Albums of 2021	29	
The Line of Best Fit	The Best Albums of 2021 Ranked	28	

== Track listing ==
Friends That Break Your Heart track listing
No.	Title	Writer(s)	Producer(s)	Length
1.	"Famous Last Words"	James Litherland	James Blake; Dominic Maker^{[b]}; Jameela Jamil^{[b]}	4:16
2.	"Life Is Not the Same"	Litherland; David Charles Marshall Biral; Denzel Michael-Akil Baptiste; George Miller	James Blake; Take a Daytrip; Joji; Khushi^{[b]}	3:19
3.	"Coming Back" (featuring SZA)	Litherland; Brittany Hazzard; Maker; Jamil; Kalim Patel; Solána Rowe	James Blake; Maker; Jamil^{[b]}; Khushi^{[b]}	3:15
4.	"Funeral"	Litherland	James Blake; Khushi^{[b]}	2:35
5.	"Frozen" (featuring JID and SwaVay)	Litherland; Destin Choice Route; Andre Jones	James Blake; Jamil^{[b]}	3:56
6.	"I'm So Blessed You're Mine"	Litherland; Maker; Jamil; Patel	James Blake; Khushi; Maker^{[b]}; Jamil^{[b]}; Josh Stadlen^{[b]}	3:15
7.	"Foot Forward"	Litherland; Ali Tamposi; Leland Wayne; Adam Feeney; Barry Mann; Dan Hill	James Blake; Metro Boomin; Frank Dukes; Maker^{[b]}; Jamil^{[b]}	2:33
8.	"Show Me" (featuring Monica Martin)	Litherland; Maker; Monica Martin	James Blake; Maker; Jamil^{[b]}; Khushi^{[b]}	3:38
9.	"Say What You Will"	Litherland; Maker; Stadlen	James Blake; Maker^{[a]}; Stadlen^{[b]}; Jamil^{[b]}	4:40
10.	"Lost Angel Nights"	Litherland; Maker; Tamposi	James Blake; Maker^{[b]}; Khushi^{[b]}; Jamil^{[b]}	3:59
11.	"Friends That Break Your Heart"	Litherland; Rick Nowels	James Blake; Nowels	3:21
12.	"If I'm Insecure"	Litherland; Nico Muhly	James Blake; Jamil^{[b]}	4:55
Total length:				43:42

Notes

- ^{^[a]} signifies a co-producer
- ^{^[b]} signifies an additional producer
- "Life Is Not the Same" features background vocals by Joji
- "Coming Back" features additional vocals by Dominic Maker

Sample credits

- "Coming Back" contains samples of "Lake Shore Drive" by Aliotta Haynes Jeremiah.
- "Foot Forward" contains samples of "Frozen in the Night", written by Dan Hill and Barry Mann, as performed by Hill.

== Personnel ==
Credits adapted from official liner notes.

=== Musicians ===
- Jameela Jamil – additional arrangement (tracks 1, 3), structure (tracks 5, 7)
- Joji – background vocals (track 2)
- Dominic Maker – additional vocals (tracks 3, 6, 7)
- Khushi – additional arrangement (tracks 3, 6), additional vocals (track 6)
- Hal Ritson – additional piano (track 3), guitar (track 3), bass (track 3)
- Richard Adlam – additional programming (track 3)
- Rob Bisel – engineering (SZA; track 3)
- Tom Elmhirst – programming (track 3)
- James Blake – vocals (track 6, 11), keyboard (track 6), programming (track 6), drum programming (track 6), Wurlitzer (track 11), synthesizer (track 11), synth bass (track 11)
- Rick Nowels – Rhodes (track 11), Mellotron (track 11), acoustic guitars (track 11)
- John Christopher Fee – keyboards (track 11)
- Nico Muhly – string arrangement (track 12)
- Nathan Schram – viola (track 12)

=== Technical ===
- James Blake – recording, mixing (tracks 1, 2, 4–7, 9, 10, 12)
- Take a Daytrip – mixing (track 2)
- Brad Bustamante – recording (track 3)
- Tom Elmhirst – mixing (tracks 3, 8); programming (track 8)
- Carl Bespolka – recording (track 6, 10)
- Khushi – recording (track 6)
- Tristan Hoogland – recording (track 7)
- Matt Scatchell – engineering for mix (track 8)
- John Christopher Fee – engineering (track 11)
- Dean Reid – mixing (track 11)
- Randy Merrill – mastering

=== Design ===
- Miles Johnston – artwork
- Bradley Pinkerton – graphic design
- Matt Burnette-Lemon – package production

== Charts ==
Chart performance for Friends That Break Your Heart
Chart (2021)	Peak position
Australian Albums (ARIA)	61
Austrian Albums (Ö3 Austria)	23
Belgian Albums (Ultratop Flanders)	11
Belgian Albums (Ultratop Wallonia)	33
Canadian Albums (Billboard)	66
Danish Albums (Hitlisten)	15
Dutch Albums (Album Top 100)	29
German Albums (Offizielle Top 100)	19
Irish Albums (IRMA)	80
Japan Hot Albums (Billboard Japan)	90
Lithuanian Albums (AGATA)	39
New Zealand Albums (RMNZ)	32
Norwegian Albums (VG-lista)	23
Portuguese Albums (AFP)	10
Scottish Albums (Official Charts)	4
Spanish Albums (Promusicae)	54
Swiss Albums (Schweizer Hitparade)	14
UK Albums (Official Charts)	4
US Billboard 200	75
US Top Alternative Albums (Billboard)	7

== Release history ==
Release history and formats for Friends That Break Your Heart
Region	Date	Label(s)	Format(s)	Ref.
Various	8 October 2021	Republic; Polydor	Digital download; streaming; CD; cassette; LP	
