= F9mily (You & Me) =

Song by Lil Nas X featuring Travis Barker

from the EP 7
- Released: June 21, 2019
- Genre: Pop punk
- Length: 2:42
- Label: Columbia
- Songwriters: Montero Hill; Travis Barker
- Producer: Travis Barker

Audio video
- "F9mily (You & Me)" on YouTube

"F9mily (You & Me)" (pronounced "Family (You & Me)") is a song by American rapper Lil Nas X featuring drummer Travis Barker of Blink-182, from Lil Nas X's second EP 7 (2019). It was written by Montero Hill and Barker, who also produced the song and played drums on the track. Although the song was originally intended for Blink-182's eight studio album, Nine (2019), it would instead be included on Lil Nas X's second studio EP and first commercial release, 7, on the 21st of June, 2019.

Upon the release of 7, "F9mily (You & Me)" would receive mixed reviews from music critics. Some praised the song for its pop punk sound, while others criticized it for the same reason. Although the song was not released as a single, it would hit number 97 on the US Rolling Stone Top 100, number 34 on the Official Aotearoa Music Charts in New Zealand, and number 6 on the US Billboard Hot Rock & Alternative Songs chart.

== Background and release ==
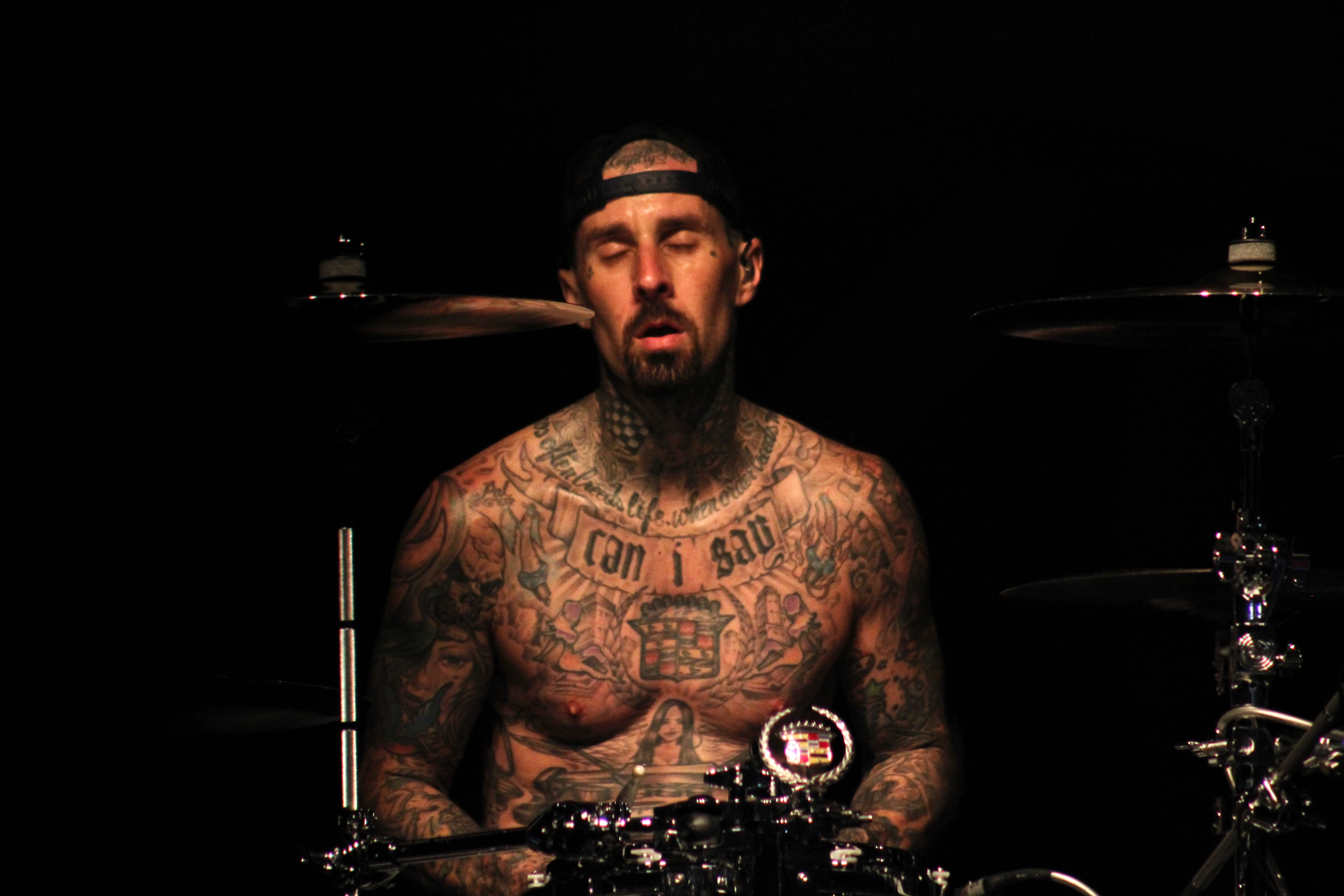
Travis Barker of Blink-182 (pictured) contributed to the song. He wrote the track with Lil Nas X, alongside producing and playing drums on the song.

Barker had originally intended for a part of the song to be in a song for his rock band Blink-182's upcoming studio album Nine. Barker has said about how he and Lil Nas X got to work on the song:

I have a song with Lil Nas X that's going to be on his EP. He came to the studio, and I played a couple [of] beats that I thought would be stuff he was into. Then I played something on accident where he stopped and was like, "What is that? I've got to have that." It was actually an idea I had for the Blink album.

On May 14, 2019, Lil Nas X posted a snippet of the song on Instagram, and wrote in a comment that it would be titled "9." The song's named would later be extended to "F9mily (You & Me)". In early June, Barker told music magazine Spin that he was in studio working with Lil Nas X on a song for Lil Nas X's EP. That same month, Lil Nas X would drop 7, which featured the song as the third track on the album.

== Critical reception ==
Mikael Wood wrote for Los Angeles Times that the song "has fuzzy Warped Tour guitars and a groove that goes half-time at one point as though designed for a mosh pit". Alternative Press's Alex Darus wrote that "rock roots" can be heard in the song, and that Lil Nas X's vocals provide "an edgier vibe".

Brian Josephs of Entertainment Weekly wrote that the song "immediately strikes out as the low point — and not only because pop punk already had its moment in the sun. Lil Nas X's lackadaisical tone doesn't exude cool; he genuinely doesn't sound convinced that the genre needs a revisit."

== Charts ==
| Chart (2019) | Peak position |
|---|---|
| New Zealand Hot Singles (RMNZ) | 34 |
| US Hot Rock Songs (Billboard) | 6 |
| US Rolling Stone Top 100 | 97 |
