= Allen Ritter =

American record producer

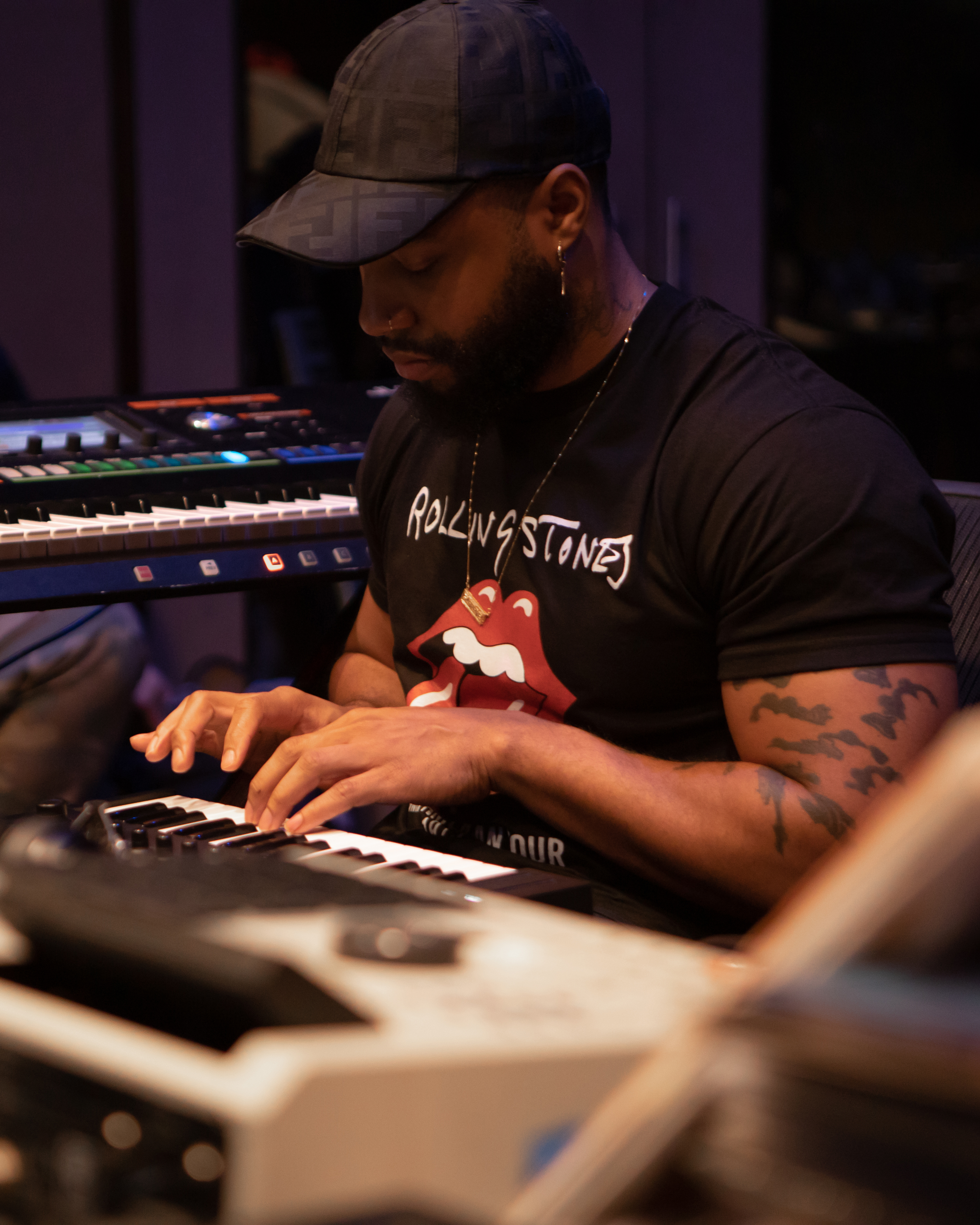
- Ritter in 2021

Background information
- Born: Allen Raphael Ritter; June 19, 1988 (age 38); Yonkers, New York, U.S.
- Origin: Danbury, Connecticut, U.S.
- Genres: Hip-hop; contemporary R&B
- Occupations: Record producer; songwriter
- Label: Warner Chappell

Allen Raphael Ritter (born June 19, 1988) is an American record producer and songwriter. A frequent collaborator of fellow producers Boi-1da, Vinylz, and Sevn Thomas, Ritter has worked in production for high-profile hip hop and R&B artists since 2007. He has been credited on Drake's "Controlla", Young Thug and Travis Scott's "Pick Up the Phone", Kanye West's "All Day" and "Father Stretch My Hands", Rihanna's "Work", and Nicki Minaj's "Regret in Your Tears", among others.

== Biography ==
Ritter was born in Yonkers, New York, and grew up in Danbury, Connecticut. He taught himself to play piano in his youth and began producing music as a teenager in the mid-2000s. In 2007/2008, he connected with New York-based producer Vinylz online and the two later began working with Toronto producer Boi-1da who had already been working with Drake. Together, they have produced a number of hits for artists like Drake, Nicki Minaj, and Chris Brown. Ritter also co-produces with Metro Boomin, with whom he produced much of Travis Scott's 2015 album Rodeo and Metro's 2018 album Not All Heroes Wear Capes, as well as other Toronto-based producers like Frank Dukes and Nineteen85.

As a solo artist, Ritter has worked on music for a number of years and released three singles in 2018.

== Discography ==
=== Singles ===
Title	Year	Album
"Never Leave"	2018	Non-album singles
"Temporary (No Love)"	2018	Non-album singles
"Falling"	2018	Non-album singles

=== Other work ===
- Kingsway Music Library – Frank Dukes x Allen Ritter Vol. 1 (sample pack)

== Awards and nominations ==
Year	Awards	Category	Nominated work	Result
2015	Grammy Awards	Best Rap Song	"All Day" (Kanye West)	Nominated
2016	Grammy Awards	Album of the Year	Views (Drake)	Nominated
2017	Grammy Awards	Record of the Year	Work (Rihanna)	Nominated
2017	Grammy Awards	Best Pop Duo/Group Performance	Work (Rihanna)	Nominated
2017	ASCAP Rhythm & Soul Music Awards	Songwriter of the Year	Himself	Won
2019	Grammy Awards	Best Rap Album	Invasion of Privacy (Cardi B)	Won
2019	Grammy Awards	Album of the Year	Scorpion (Drake)	Nominated
2022	Grammy Awards	Best Progressive R&B Album	Table for Two (Lucky Daye)	Won
2023	Grammy Awards	Best Rap Album	Heroes and Villains (Metro Boomin)	Nominated
2023	Grammy Awards	Best Rap Album	Utopia (Travis Scott)	Nominated
2024	Grammy Awards	Best Rap Album	We Don't Trust You (Metro Boomin & Future)	Nominated

== Production discography ==
List of songs as producer or co-producer, with performing artists and other credited producers, showing year released and album name. Partial discography, adapted from Jaxsta.

† indicates songwriting credit only.

Title	Year	Performing artist(s)	Album	Other producer(s)
Headphones †	2013	Nelly	M.O	Soul Unique
Castles	2013	Joe Budden	No Love Lost	Vinylz
No New Friends	2013	Dj Khaled, Drake, Rick Ross, Lil Wayne	Suffering From Success	Vinylz, Boi-1da, Robert Bullock, 40
5AM in Toronto	2013	Drake	Non-album single	Boi-1da, Vinylz
The Language	2013	Drake	Nothing Was the Same	Vinylz, Boi-1da
We Go Wherever We Want	2013	French Montana, Ne-Yo, Raekwon	Excuse My French	Vinylz, Reefa
Was it Worth It	2013	Kid Ink, Sterling Simms	Almost Home	Vinylz
Grindin'	2013	Lil Wayne, Drake	Non-album single	Vinylz, Boi-1da, Detail
Dreams	2014	Teyana Taylor	VII	—N/a
Don't Play	2014	Travis Scott, Big Sean, The 1975	Days Before Rodeo	Vinylz, Travis Scott, Anthony Kilhoffer
All Things Go	2014	Nicki Minaj	The Pinkprint	Vinylz, Boi-1da
Vulnerable	2014	Tinashe, Travis Scott	Black Water	Vinylz, Boi-1da
Chiraq	2014	Nicki Minaj, G Herbo	Non-album single	Vinylz, Boi-1da
Blessings	2015	Big Sean, Drake, Kanye West	Dark Sky Paradise	Vinylz
All Day	2015	Kanye West	Non-album single	Kanye West, French Montana, Puff Daddy, Velous, et al.
Remember Me	2015	Chris Brown, Tyga	Fan of a Fan: The Album	Jess Jackson, Vinylz, Boi-1da
You & the 6 †	2015	Drake, Travis Scott	If You're Reading This It's Too Late	WondaGurl, Travis Scott, Southside, TM88
Know Yourself †	2015	Drake	If You're Reading This It's Too Late	Boi-1da, Vinylz, Syk Sense
You Changed Me	2015	Jamie Foxx, Chris Brown	Hollywood: A Story of a Dozen Roses	Boi-1da, Vinylz, DJ Scout, Jordan Evans
On The Dot	2015	Jamie Foxx, Fabolous	Hollywood: A Story of a Dozen Roses	Vinylz
Like Me	2015	Lil Durk, Jeremih	Remember My Name	Boi-1da, Vinylz
R.I.C.O.	2015	Meek Mill, Drake	Dreams Worth More Than Money	Vinylz, Cubeatz
Paradise	2015	Young Thug	Non-album single	—N/a
Party Favors	2015	Tinashe, Young Thug	Nightride	Boi-1da, Vinylz, Illangelo
On My Vibe	2015	Lil Duke, Travis Scott	Lil Duke	—N/a
Oh My Dis Side	2015	Travis Scott, Quavo	Rodeo	Travis Scott, Frank Dukes, Mike Dean
3500	2015	Travis Scott, Future, 2 Chainz	Rodeo	Metro Boomin, Mike Dean, Travis Scott, Mano, Zaytoven
90210	2015	Travis Scott, Kacy Hill	Rodeo	DJ Dahi, Mike Dean, Travis Scott, WondaGurl
Pray 4 Love †	2015	Travis Scott, The Weeknd	Rodeo	Illangelo, The Weeknd, Mike Dean, Ben Billions, Travis Scott
Nightcrawler †	2015	Travis Scott, Swae Lee, Chief Keef	Rodeo	Metro Boomin, Mike Dean, Travis Scott, Southside, TM88
Impossible †	2015	Travis Scott	Rodeo	Mike Dean, Travis Scott
Maria I'm Drunk †	2015	Travis Scott, Justin Bieber, Young Thug	Rodeo	Travis Scott, Frank Dukes, Maneesh Bidaye, Mike Dean
Flying High	2015	Travis Scott, Toro y Moi	Rodeo	Pharrell, Mike Dean, Travis Scott
I Can Tell	2015	Travis Scott	Rodeo	Mike Dean, Travis Scott, FKi
Never Catch Me	2015	Travis Scott	Rodeo	Sonny Digital, WondaGurl
Thought It Was a Drought	2015	Future	DS2	Metro Boomin
Back to Sleep	2015	Chris Brown	Royalty	Vinylz, Boi-1da
A-Team	2016	Travis Scott	Non-album single	—N/a
Work †	2016	Rihanna, Drake	Anti	Boi-1da, Sevn Thomas, Kuk Harrell, 40
Drippin'	2016	Young Thug	Slime Season 3	—N/a
The Hooch	2016	Travis Scott	Non-album single	Vinylz, Boi-1da
Controlla	2016	Drake	Views	Boi-1da, Supa Dups, Di Genius
4PM In Calabasas	2016	Drake	Non-album single	Frank Dukes, Vinylz
Diamonds Dancing	2016	Drake, Future	What a Time to Be Alive	Metro Boomin, Frank Dukes
Father Stretch My Hands, Pt. 1	2016	Kanye West	The Life of Pablo	Kanye West, Mike Dean, Metro Boomin, DJDS, Noah Goldstein
Saint Pablo	2016	Kanye West	The Life of Pablo	Kanye West, Mike Dean, Noah Goldstein
Pick Up The Phone	2016	Travis Scott, Young Thug, Quavo	Birds in the Trap Sing McKnight	Vinylz, Frank Dukes, Mike Dean
Lose	2016	Travis Scott, Cassie	Birds in the Trap Sing McKnight	Vinylz, Frank Dukes, Mike Dean
Circles	2016	Pusha T, Ty Dolla Sign, Desiigner	Def Jam Presents: Direct Deposit Vol. 1	Vinylz, Boi-1da, Frank Dukes
Hello	2016	Ty Dolla Sign	Campaign	—N/a
Pu$$y	2016	Ty Dolla Sign, Trey Songz, Wiz Khalifa	Campaign	Mustard
Go	2017	Huncho Jack	Huncho Jack, Jack Huncho	Vinylz, Cubeatz
Moon Rock	2017	Huncho Jack	Huncho Jack, Jack Huncho	Vinylz, Cubeatz
Run Me Dry	2017	Bryson Tiller	True to Self	Boi-1da
Forever	2017	Joyner Lucas	508-507-2209	Boi-1da, Joyner Lucas
Free Smoke	2017	Drake	More Life	Boi-1da, Akira Woodgrain
Do Not Disturb	2017	Drake	More Life	Boi-1da, 40
No Limit	2017	G-Eazy, Cardi B, ASAP Rocky	The Beautiful & Damned	Boi-1da
Make a Toast	2017	Belly	Mumble Rap	Boi-1da, Vinylz, T-Minus, DannyboyStyles
Regret in Your Tears	2017	Nicki Minaj	Non-album single	Boi-1da, Frank Dukes
Sacrifices	2017	Big Sean, Migos	I Decided	Metro Boomin
Night Call †	2017	Steve Aoki, Lil Yachty, Migos	Steve Aoki Presents Kolony	Steve Aoki
Imitadora	2017	Romeo Santos	Golden	Vinylz, Frank Dukes, Romeo Santos
Sin Filtro	2017	Romeo Santos	Golden	Vinylz, Frank Dukes, Illangelo, Illmind
The Bloodiest	2018	Jay Rock	Redemption	Boi-1da, Jake One
Joyride	2018	Tinashe	Joyride	Hit-Boy
Best Life	2018	Cardi B, Chance The Rapper	Invasion of Privacy	Boi-1da
Over Me	2018	G-Eazy, RJ, Jay Ant	The Vault	Vinylz, Cubeatz
Mob Ties	2018	Drake	Scorpion	Boi-1da
Stargazing	2018	Travis Scott	Astroworld	Sonny Digital, 30 Roc, B Wheezy, Bkorn, Mike Dean, Travis Scott
NC-17	2018	Travis Scott, 21 Savage	Astroworld	Boi-1da, Cubeatz, Mike Dean
Dreamcatcher	2018	Metro Boomin, Swae Lee, Travis Scott	Not All Heroes Wear Capes	Metro Boomin
Space Cadet	2018	Metro Boomin, Gunna	Not All Heroes Wear Capes	Metro Boomin, Wheezy
Up to Something	2018	Metro Boomin, Travis Scott, Young Thug	Not All Heroes Wear Capes	Metro Boomin, Southside
Only You	2018	Metro Boomin, Wizkid, Offset, J Balvin	Not All Heroes Wear Capes	Metro Boomin
Miami †	2018	Bri Steves	Non-album single	Bri Steves
No Static	2018	District 21	No Static	Vinylz, Frank Dukes
Tell Them	2019	James Blake, Moses Sumney, Metro Boomin	Assume Form	James Blake, Metro Boomin, Dre Moon
Wild Wild West	2019	Offset, Gunna	Father of 4	Metro Boomin
North Star	2019	Offset, CeeLo Green	Father of 4	Metro Boomin
After Dark	2019	Offset	Father of 4	Metro Boomin, Dre Moon
HMP	2019	PnB Rock	TrapStar Turnt PopStar (Deluxe)	Rex Kudo
C7osure (You Like)	2019	Lil Nas X	7	Boi-1da, Abaz, X-Plosive
Need a Stack	2019	Chris Brown, Lil Wayne, Joyner Lucas	Indigo	Boi-1da, Frank Dukes
Too Late	2019	Pardison Fantaine, Jadakiss	Under8ed	Boi-1da, Frank Dukes
So What	2020	dvsn, Popcaan	A Muse in Her Feelings	Nineteen85, Raaheim
A Muse	2020	dvsn	A Muse in Her Feelings	Nineteen85
...Again †	2020	dvsn, Shantel May	A Muse in Her Feelings	Nineteen85, Joe Reeves
Until I Say So	2020	Shantel May, Westside Gun		Nineteen85, Neenyo
Where You Are	2020	Savannah Ré	Opia	Boi-1da
Love Me Back †	2020	Savannah Ré	Opia	Boi-1da, Jordan Manswell, Sean Fisher
Konklusions	2020	Kehlani, YG	Non-album single	Boi-1da, Jahann Sweet
IDWK	2021	347aiden, Kenny Beats	Non-album single	Kenny Beats, Frank Dukes
Access Denied †	2021	Lucky Daye	Table for Two	Vinylz
Born 2 Be Great † (sampled)	2021	Lil Tjay	Destined 2 Win	Bordeaux, Non Native
Chi-Raq	2021	Nicki Minaj, G Herbo	Beam Me Up Scotty (Rerelease)	Boi-1da, Vinylz
You	2021	Don Toliver	Life of a Don	Mike Dean
Poochie Gown	2022	Gunna	Drip Season 4Ever	Metro Boomin, Southside
Golden	2022	Russ	Chomp 2	Boi-1da, Don Mills
One Time	2022	Metro Boomin, John Legend	Heroes and Villains	Peter Lee Johnson, TM88, DJ Moon, Johan Lenox
Superhero (Heroes & Villains)	2022	Metro Boomin, Future, Chris Brown	Heroes and Villains	Metro Boomin, David x Eli
Too Many Nights	2022	Metro Boomin, Don Toliver, Future	Heroes and Villains	Metro Boomin, Honorable C Note
Trance	2022	Metro Boomin, Travis Scott, Young Thug	Heroes and Villains	Metro Boomin, Peter Lee Johnson
Metro Spider	2022	Metro Boomin, Young Thug	Heroes and Villains	Metro Boomin, Nik D, OZ, Elkan
Niagara Falls (Foot or 2)	2022	Metro Boomin, Travis Scott, 21 Savage	Heroes and Villains	Metro Boomin, Peter Lee Johnson, My Best Friend Jacob
Lock on Me	2022	Metro Boomin, Travis Scott, Future	Heroes and Villains	Metro Boomin, Chris Townsend
Time Heals All	2023	Don Toliver	Love Sick	206derek, Bryvn, Matty Spat
Want me Dead	2023	Young Thug, 21 Savage	Business is Business	Metro Broomin, Dre Moon, David x Eli
Thank God	2023	Travis Scott	Utopia	Wondagurl, FNZ, BoogzDaBeast, Kanye West, Travis Scott,
Del Resto	2023	Travis Scott, Beyonce	Utopia	Hit-Boy, Mike Dean, Beyonce, Travis Scott
Lost Forever	2023	Travis Scott, Westside Gunn	Utopia	The Alchemist, James Blake, Dom Maker
Somebody	2023	Jung Kook	Golden	Roza, Jon Bellion
Pop Your S**t	2024	21 Savage, Young Thug	American Dream	Metro Boomin
Rich Boy	2024	Bryson Tiller	Bryson Tiller	Vinylz, Boi-1da, Frank Dukes
Sorry's and Ferraris	2024	Polo G	Non Album Single	Metro Boomin, Dre Moon
Cinderella	2024	Future, Metro Boomin, Travis Scott	We Dont Trust You	Metro Boomin, Dre Moon
Seen it All	2024	Future, Metro	We Dont Trust You	Metro Boomin, Peter Lee Johnson
God's Favorite	2024	Polo G	Hood Poet	Nick Papz, Pink Slip, Inverness, Ryan Bakalarczyk, Xander
No Recruits	2024	Polo G, G Herbo	Hood Poet	Southside, Smatt Sertified, Macshooter, ProdLau, Noahhh
Only Gang	2024	Polo G, 42 Dugg	Hood Poet	Southside, Smatt Sertified, Jermaine Elliott
Same Me	2024	Polo G, Fridayy	Hood Poet	Zack Bia, Jaasu, Jermaine Elliott, Fridayy
Detox	2024	Polo G	Hood Poet	Southside, Dru DeCaro, Snake Child
Thorns	2024	Polo G	Hood Poet	Southside, Shottie, TooDope, Lufye
G63	2024	Polo G, Offset	Hood Poet	Southside, Smatt Sertified, Roza, Splitted Stupid, ALyX
We Uh Shoot	2024	Polo G	Hood Poet	Southside, TM88, Rozay Knockin, Macshooter, Jermaine Elliott, Von 88
Rain Fallin	2024	Polo G	Hood Poet	Southside, Wasa, Smatt Sertified, Jermaine Elliott
No turning Back	2024	Polo G	Hood Poet	Southside, Wasa, Smatt Sertified
Survival of the fittest	2024	Polo G, Future	Hood Poet	Atl Jacob, Carlton, Hendrix Smoke, Thank You Fizzle, Roza, Whydah, Hawky, Da Real Kobi
Father's Day	2024	Polo G	Hood Poet	Southside, CuBeatz, Luis Bacque, Jermaine Elliott, Smatt Sertified
From The Heart	2024	Polo G	Hood Poet	Southside, Smatt Sertified, Klimperboy, Joy
Red	2025	Nav	OMW2 Rexdale	Late Night Ricky
Rich and Broke	2025	Jon Bellion	Father Figure	Pete Nappi, Tenroc, George Benevides, The Diner
"Build a Bitch"	2026	Future	The Real Me	Dre Moon
