= C7osure (You Like) =

Song by Lil Nas X

Song by Lil Nas X

from the EP 7
- Released: June 21, 2019
- Genre: House; R&B; pop-rap
- Length: 2:32
- Label: Columbia
- Songwriters: Montero Hill; Allen Ritter; Matthew Jehu Samuels; Imran Abbas; Jahaan Sweet; Thomas Kessler
- Producers: Boi-1da; Ritter; Abaz (misc.); X-Plosive (misc.)

Audio video
- "C7osure (You Like)" on YouTube

"C7osure (You Like)" is a song by American rapper Lil Nas X. It is the seventh track on his second EP, 7 (2019). The song was produced by Boi-1da and Allen Ritter, with miscellaneous production by Abaz and X-Plosive. Imran Abbas, Jahaan Sweet, and Thomas Kessler also earned writing credits alongside Boi-1da, Ritter, and Lil Nas X himself. The song was influenced by Lil Nas X's sexuality, with Lil Nas X coming out as gay on the track. Musically, it is a house, R&B, and pop rap record.

Upon the release of 7, "C7osure (You Like)" would receive positive reviews from music critics. Although the song was not released as a single, it charted at number 60 in Lithuania, number 27 on the Official Aotearoa Music Charts in New Zealand, and number 14 on the Billboard Bubbling Under Hot 100 chart in the United States.

== Background ==
German producers X-Plosive and Abaz created a sketch for the beat two years prior to its release. In an interview with Rolling Stone, they said they "had Drake on our minds [making that], something really melodic."

== Lyrics and themes ==
nope
(@LilNasX)
tweeted:

some of y’all already know, some of y’all don’t care, some of y’all not gone fwm no more. but before this month ends i want y’all to listen closely to my song c7osure. 🌈🤩✨

June 30, 2019

In the song, Lil Nas X tells his fans that he plans to never have a solid plan. Desire Thompson of Vibe states that the message of the song is about "pushing forward, despite fears of what's on the other side."

On June 30, 2019, the last day of Pride Month, Lil Nas X tweeted that the lyrics of "C7osure" talk about his sexuality. He also tweeted the track cover that has a rainbow colored building, going as far as to say "dead-ass thought I made it obvious", and showing two pictures of the EP cover. One with how it normally looks, and one where the picture is zoomed in on the rainbow building. He said that the lyrics of "C7osure" confirm his identification as a member of the LGBT community.

== Critical reception ==
Craig Jenkins of Vulture describes the track as "a promising up-tempo disco jam." Jenkins describes "C7osure" and "Panini" as "breezy, catchy love songs."

== Personnel ==
- Lil Nas X – lead artist
- Boi-1da – production
- Allen Ritter – production
- Abaz – miscellaneous production
- X-Plosive – miscellaneous production
- DJ Riggins – assistant engineering
- Jacob Richards – assistant engineering
- Mike Seaberg – assistant engineering
- Ray Charles Brown, Jr. – recording engineer
- Jaycen Joshua – mixing
- Eric Lagg – mastering

== Charts ==
Chart (2019)	Peak position
Lithuania (AGATA)	60
New Zealand Hot Singles (RMNZ)	27
US Bubbling Under Hot 100 (Billboard)	14
