= Take a Daytrip =

American record production and songwriting duo

- Genres: Hip hop; trap; pop
- Years active: 2014–present
- Label: UMPG
- Members: David Biral; Denzel Baptiste

Take a Daytrip is an American record production and songwriting duo composed of Denzel Baptiste (born January 9, 1993) and David Biral (born February 22, 1993). They are best known for producing singles such as Sheck Wes' "Mo Bamba", Lil Nas X's "Panini", "Montero (Call Me by Your Name)", and "Industry Baby" (featuring Jack Harlow), Juice Wrld's "Legends", and Travis Scott and Kid Cudi's "The Scotts", all of which peaked in the top 30 of the Billboard Hot 100. Their productions are identified by the producer tag "Daytrip took it to ten".

== History ==
The duo met while Baptiste and Biral were attending New York University and started producing in 2014. In 2016, they collaborated with Rockstar Games to produce the score of the Grand Theft Auto Online update; 'Import/Export'. They have produced many hit singles, with their first notable track being "Mo Bamba" by Sheck Wes in 2017, which peaked at number six on the Billboard Hot 100. Their highest-charting singles currently are "The Scotts" by Travis Scott and Kid Cudi and "Montero (Call Me by Your Name)" and "Industry Baby" by Lil Nas X, both of which peaked at number one on the Billboard Hot 100.

In 2022, the duo launched No Idle, a publishing imprint in partnership with Universal Music Publishing Group. In 2025, Baptiste and Biral were announced as one of the remixers for the 2026 FIFA World Cup theme, representing the New York metropolitan area, and in September, were named artists-in-residence at New York University's Clive Davis Institute of Recorded Music for the fall semester.

== Legal issues ==
In October 2019, two Atlanta producers, Don Lee and Glen Keith Demeritt III, claimed that the Lil Nas X and Cardi B song "Rodeo" was a copy of the song "Broad Day" by Puerto Reefa and Sakrite Duexe, which they produced. The two sued Lil Nas X, Cardi B, and Take a Daytrip. The case ended when it was dismissed with prejudice by the court.

== Discography ==
=== Singles ===
- "I Don't Mind" (with Treez Lowkey) (2017)
- "Fiji" (with Sam Austins) (2017)
- "Stressed" (with Octavian) (2019)
- "Louis" (featuring Jesse) (2019)
- "Lighthouse" (featuring Rico Nasty, Slowthai, and Icecoldbishop) (2019)
- "Tiki Taka Toco" (featuring Fuerza Regida) (2023)
- "Life Size" (featuring Mahalia) (2024)
- "south" (featuring Blxckie) (2024)
- "O Cara Do Trem" (featuring Xamã) (2024)
- "Ready, Ok" (with Maleigh Zan) (2025)
- "New York New Jersey Theme (FIFA World Cup 26)" (2025)
- "SNOWFLAKE.001" (with NEW STATIC) (2025)

=== Featured singles ===
- "Raw Emotions" (with Stolar) (2017)
- "Poison" (Octavian featuring Take a Daytrip, Obongjayar, and Santi) (2020)
- "Soda" (DJ Scheme featuring Cordae, Ski Mask the Slump God, and Take a Daytrip) (2020)
- "Y Don't U" (Park Hye Jin featuring Clams Casino and Take a Daytrip) (2021)
- "Pervesa" (Pedro Sampaio featuring J Balvin and Take a Daytrip) (2025)
- "Story" (Fireboy DML and Take a Daytrip) (2025)
- "At Peace" (Karan Aujla, Ikky and Take a Daytrip) (2025)

=== Filmography ===
- Smile 2 (2024) : Produced and co-wrote "Grieved You"

== Production discography ==
Year	Title	Artist(s)	Album	Credits
2014	Cigarette Song	Raury	Indigo Child	Composer, producer
2014	Amor	Raury	Indigo Child	Composer, producer
2015	Her	Raury	All We Need	Engineer, composer, producer
2015	Kingdom Come	Raury	All We Need	Engineer, composer, producer
2015	Questions	Chaz French	These Things Take Time	Engineer, composer, producer
2015	Sometimes	Chaz French	These Things Take Time	Engineer, composer, producer
2015	We Made It	Chaz French	These Things Take Time	Engineer, composer, producer
2016	Up To The Crime (feat. 77Klash & Vybz Kartel)	Take a Daytrip	Single	Mixer, engineer, composer, producer
2016	D.O.A.	Take a Daytrip & Treez Lowkey	Single	Engineer, composer, producer
2016	Listen	Take a Daytrip & Treez Lowkey	Single	Mixer, engineer, composer, producer
2016	To The Max	Take a Daytrip & Treez Lowkey	Single	Mixer, engineer, composer, producer
2016	Pay Attention	Take a Daytrip & Treez Lowkey	Single	Engineer, composer, producer
2016	Crystal Coated	Aaron Fontwell	Single	Engineer, composer, producer
2016	Bury Me	The Skins	Still Sleep	Engineer, composer, producer
2016	I	The Skins	Still Sleep	Engineer, composer, producer
2016	Go Off	The Skins	Still Sleep	Engineer, composer, producer
2016	Stampede	The Skins	Still Sleep	Engineer, composer, producer
2016	Worst Luck	6LACK	FREE 6LACK	
2016	Twisted Love	Nessly	Solo Boy Band	Mixer, engineer, composer, producer
2016	Regular	Nessly	Solo Boy Band	Mixer, engineer, composer, producer
2016	Never Knew	Nessly	Solo Boy Band	Mixer, engineer, composer, producer
2017	I Don't Mind	Take a Daytrip & Treez Lowkey	Single	Mixer, engineer, composer, producer
2017	FYE	Take a Daytrip & Treez Lowkey	Single	Mixer, engineer, composer, producer
2017	Over Do It	Take a Daytrip & Treez Lowkey	Single	Mixer, engineer, composer, producer
2017	Working	Take a Daytrip & Treez Lowkey	Single	Mixer, engineer, composer, producer
2017	Blame	Jesse	&	Engineer, composer, producer
2017	Barbie & Ken	Jesse	&	Engineer, composer, producer
2017	Nomadic (feat. Joji)	Higher Brothers	Single	Engineer, composer, producer
2017	Believe (feat. Quavo & Lil Yachty)	A-Trak	Single	Engineer, composer, producer
2017	Mo Bamba	Sheck Wes	Mudboy	Mixer, engineer, composer, producer
2018	Thank God	Nessly	Wildflower	Mixer, engineer, composer, producer
2018	Ungrateful	Nessly	Wildflower	Mixer, engineer, composer, producer
2018	WHOHASIT (ft Ski Mask The Slump God)	Nessly	Wildflower	Engineer, composer, producer
2018	Ballerina (Interlude)	Nessly	Wildflower	Engineer, composer, producer
2018	Back 2 Life	Nessly	Wildflower	Mixer, engineer, composer, producer
2018	Water Springs (feat. 24hrs)	Nessly	Wildflower	Mixer, engineer, composer, producer
2018	Can't Answer	Nessly	Wildflower	Mixer, engineer, composer, producer
2018	Not My Lover (feat. Hoodrich Pablo Juan)	Nessly	Wildflower	Mixer, engineer, composer, producer
2018	Bungee Jump! (Interlude)	Nessly	Wildflower	Mixer
2018	Downers	Nessly	Wildflower	Mixer
2018	Sorry Not Sorry	Nessly	Wildflower	Mixer, engineer, composer, producer
2018	Secret	Nessly	Wildflower	Mixer, engineer, composer, producer
2018	Make It Right (feat. Joji)	Nessly	Wildflower	Mixer, engineer, composer, producer
2018	Kung Fu	Cordae	YBN: The Mixtape	Mixer, engineer, composer, producer
2018	Target	Cordae	YBN: The Mixtape	Mixer, engineer, composer, producer
2018	Nervous (feat. Lil Baby, Rich The Kid, and Jay Critch)	Famous Dex	Single	Composer, producer
2018	Give It All Up	Lil West	Single	Engineer, composer, producer
2018	Baile de la Lluvia	C. Tangana	Avida Dollars	Producer
2018	Complicado	Audri Nix	Single	Engineer, composer, producer
2018	Legends	Juice Wrld	Fighting Demons	Composer, producer
2018	Rich and Blind	Juice Wrld	Fighting Demons	Composer, producer
2018	Doom	Juice Wrld	Fighting Demons	Composer, producer
2018	Lil Boat	88 Glam	88GLAM2.5	Engineer, composer, producer
2018	Endz	88 Glam	88GLAM2.5	Engineer, composer, producer
2018	Dummy	6ix9ine	Dummy Boy	Composer, producer
2018	Home	Vince Staples	Spider-Man: Into the Spider-Verse (Soundtrack from & Inspired by the Motion Picture)	Composer, producer
2018	BERZERK	Scarlxrd	INFINITY	Composer, producer
2019	2pennies (feat. Tommy Genesis)	Lil West	Vex Part 1	Mixer, engineer, composer, producer
2019	No L's (feat. Yung Bans)	Lil West	Vex Part 1	Mixer, engineer, composer, producer
2019	Can't Be You	Lil West	Vex Part 1	Mixer, engineer, composer, producer
2019	Not Sure	Lil West	Vex Part 1	Mixer, engineer, composer, producer
2019	Help	Lil West	Vex Part 1	Mixer, engineer, composer, producer
2019	Somedays	Lil West	Vex Part 1	Mixer, engineer, composer, producer
2019	Barn	Lil West	Vex Part 1	Mixer, engineer, composer, producer
2019	Bad	Lil West	Vex Part 2	Mixer, engineer, composer, producer
2019	Want Love (feat. Calboy)	Lil West	Vex Part 2	Mixer, engineer, composer, producer
2019	Ran Outta Time	Lil West	Vex Part 2	Mixer, engineer, composer, producer
2019	Hot Sauce	Lil West	Vex Part 2	Mixer, engineer, composer, producer
2019	Pay Me	Lil West	Vex Part 2	Mixer, engineer, composer, producer
2019	Flaws (feat. Baby Goth)	Lil West	Vex Part 2	Mixer, engineer, composer, producer
2019	Better	Lil West	Vex Part 2	Mixer, engineer, composer, producer
2019	Upset	Lil West	Vex Part 2	Mixer, engineer, composer, producer
2019	I Don't Even Crip	Yung Bans	MISUNDERSTOOD	Composer, producer
2019	Single Again	Big Sean	Single	Composer, producer
2019	Facts	Kevin Gates	I'm Him	Composer, producer
2019	Fatal Attraction	Kevin Gates	I'm Him	Composer, producer
2019	Ice Box	Kevin Gates	I'm Him	Composer, producer
2019	Louis (feat. Jesse)	Take a Daytrip	Single	Composer, producer
2019	Ready Set (feat. Big Sean)	Kash Doll	Single	Composer, producer
2019	Broke as Fuck	Cordae	The Lost Boy	Composer, producer
2019	No Rappers	G-Eazy	B-Sides	Composer, producer
2019	Lighthouse (feat. Rico Nasty, ICECOLDBISHOP, & Slowthai)	Take a Daytrip	Single	Engineer, Producer
2019	Play Wit Ya	Dreezy	Big Dreez	Composer, producer
2019	Stressed	Take a Daytrip, Octavian	Single	Engineer, composer, producer
2019	STP	Cousin Stizz	Trying To Find My Next Thrill	Mixer, engineer, composer, producer
2019	Panini	Lil Nas X	7	Engineer, composer, producer
2019	Rodeo (feat. Cardi B)	Lil Nas X	7	Engineer, composer, producer
2019	AL1ENZ	Denzel Curry, Cordae	Single	Composer, producer
2020	Speed Me Up (feat. Ty Dolla $ign, Lil Yachty, & Sueco The Child)	Wiz Khalifa	Single	Composer, producer
2020	Levi High (feat. DaBaby)	DaniLeigh	MOVIE	Composer, producer
2020	Poison (feat. Take a Daytrip, Obongjayar, & Santi)	Octavian	Single	Engineer, composer, producer
2020	Good In Bed	Dua Lipa	Future Nostalgia	Composer, producer
2020	Samba	NSG	Roots	Engineer, composer, producer
2020	West Ten	AJ Tracey, Mabel	Flu Game	Engineer, composer, producer
2020	Hero	Weezer	Van Weezer	Composer
2020	THE SCOTTS	THE SCOTTS, Travis Scott, Kid Cudi	TBA	Composer, producer
2020	Pick From Pain	YoungBoy Never Broke Again	38 Baby 2	Composer, producer
2020	Wolves (feat. Post Malone)	Big Sean	Detroit 2	Composer, producer
2020	Everything That's Missing (feat. Dwele)	Big Sean	Detroit 2	Composer, producer
2020	Bad Energy	Juice Wrld	Legends Never Die	Composer, producer
2020	"High"	Miley Cyrus	Plastic Hearts	Composer, producer
2020	"Soda" (feat. Cordae, Ski Mask the Slump God, & Take a Daytrip)	DJ Scheme	FAMILY	Composer, producer
2020	"Holiday"	Lil Nas X	Single	Engineer, composer, producer
2020	"STFU"	Rico Nasty	Nightmare Vacation	Engineer, composer, producer
2020	"Girl Scouts"	Rico Nasty	Nightmare Vacation	Engineer, composer, producer
2020	Tequila Shots	Kid Cudi	Man on the Moon III: The Chosen	Composer, producer
2020	Another Day	Kid Cudi	Man on the Moon III: The Chosen	Composer, producer
2020	Damaged	Kid Cudi	Man on the Moon III: The Chosen	Composer, producer
2020	Sad People	Kid Cudi	Man on the Moon III: The Chosen	Composer, producer
2020	Rockstar Knights (feat. Trippie Redd)	Kid Cudi	Man on the Moon III: The Chosen	Composer, producer
2020	4 da Kids	Kid Cudi	Man on the Moon III: The Chosen	Composer, producer
2020	"Lord I Know"	Kid Cudi	Man on the Moon III: The Chosen	Composer, producer
2020	"For Real" (featuring Kemba)	Jharrel Jerome	Non-album single	Composer, producer
2021	"Montero (Call Me by Your Name)"	Lil Nas X	Montero	Composer, producer
2021	"Sun Goes Down"	Lil Nas X	Montero	Composer, producer
2021	"Industry Baby" (feat. Jack Harlow)	Lil Nas X	Montero	Composer, producer
2021	"Dead Right Now"	Lil Nas X	Montero	Composer, producer
2021	"The Art of Realization"	Lil Nas X	Montero	Composer, producer
2021	"Scoop" (feat. Doja Cat)	Lil Nas X	Montero	Composer, producer
2021	"Dolla Sign Slime" (feat. Megan Thee Stallion)	Lil Nas X	Montero	Composer, producer
2021	"Tales of Dominica"	Lil Nas X	Montero	Composer, producer
2021	"Don't Want It"	Lil Nas X	Montero	Composer, producer
2021	"Am I Dreaming" (feat. Miley Cyrus)	Lil Nas X	Montero	Composer, producer
2021	"Sailor's Superstition"	Serpentwithfeet	Deacon	Composer, producer
2021	"Life Is Not the Same"	James Blake	Friends That Break Your Heart	Composer, producer
2021	"Doom"	Juice WRLD	Fighting Demons	Composer, producer
2022	"Stars in the Sky"	Kid Cudi	Single	Composer, producer
2022	Late to da Party (feat. Youngboy Never Broke Again)	Lil Nas X, Youngboy Never Broke Again	Single	Composer, producer
2023	"Tiki Taka Toco"	Fuerza Regida and Take a Daytrip	Tiki Taka Toco - Single	Producer, performer
2024	"Life Size"	Mahalia and Take a Daytrip	Life Size - Single	Producer, programmer, composer
2024	"South"	Blxckie and Take a Daytrip	South - Single	Producer, keyboardist, composer
2024	"O Cara Do Trem"	Xamã and Take a Daytrip	O Cara Do Trem - Single	Producer, composer
2024	"PERVERSA"	Pedro Sampaio, J Balvin and Take a Daytrip	PERVERSA - Single	Producer, performer, composer
2024	"Light Again!"	Lil Nas X	Light Again! - Single	Producer
2025	"New York New Jersey Theme (FIFA World Cup 26)"	Take a Daytrip	The Official FIFA World Cup 26 Host City Themes EP	Producer, performer
2025	"Story"	Fireboy DML and Take a Daytrip	Story - Single	Producer, performer, composer
2025	"Hotbox"	Lil Nas X	HOTBOX - Single	Producer
2025	"At Peace"	Karan Aujla, Ikky and Take a Daytrip	At Peace - Single	Producer, programmer, composer
2025	"SNOWFLAKE.001"	Take a Daytrip and NEW STATIC	SNOWFLAKE.001 - Single	Producer, programmer, composer
	"HOME."	Armani White	THERE'S A GHOST IN MY HOUSE.	Producer, composer
2026	"No Trespassing"	A$AP Rocky	Don't Be Dumb	Producer, composer

=== Charted songs ===
Title	Year	Peak chart positions						Certifications	Album
Title	Year	US	US R&B/HH	AUS	CAN	NZ	UK	Certifications	Album
"Mo Bamba" (Sheck Wes)	2017	6	2	29	5	16	26	RIAA: 5× Platinum; MC: 3× Platinum	Mudboy
"Legends" (Juice Wrld)	2018	29	13	97	26	—	98	RIAA: Platinum; MC: Gold	Fighting Demons
"Lil Boat" (88Glam)	2018	—	—	—	8	—	—	MC: Gold	88Glam 2
"Panini" (Lil Nas X)	2019	5	2	15	8	14	21	RIAA: 5× Platinum; MC: 4× Platinum	7
"Single Again" (Big Sean)	2019	64	25	—	—	—	—		Non-album single
"Rodeo" (Lil Nas X and Cardi B or featuring Nas)	2020	22	12	72	44	—	55	RIAA: Platinum; MC: Gold	7
"The Scotts" (Travis Scott and Kid Cudi as the Scotts)	2020	1	1	4	1	2	11	RIAA: Platinum	The Scotts
"West Ten" (AJ Tracey and Mabel)	2020	—	—	—	—	—	5	BPI: Gold	Flu Game
"Bad Energy" (Juice Wrld)	2020	16	13	42	36	—	—		Legends Never Die
"Wolves" (Big Sean and Post Malone)	2020	65	24	—	56	—	—		Detroit 2
"Holiday" (Lil Nas X)	2020	37	11	44	26	10	41		Non-album single
"Montero (Call Me by Your Name)" (Lil Nas X)	2021	1	—	1	1	2	1	RIAA: 2× Platinum; ARIA: Platinum; BPI: Platinum; IFPI SWI: Gold; RMNZ: Platinum	Montero
"Sun Goes Down" (Lil Nas X)	2021	66	—	82	41	—	42		Montero
"Industry Baby" (Lil Nas X and Jack Harlow)	2021	1	1	6	3	5	13		Montero
"Dead Right Now" (Lil Nas X)	2021	72	34	—	57	—	—		Montero
"Scoop" (Lil Nas X featuring Doja Cat)	2021	42	13	—	41	—	—		Montero
"Dolla Sign Slime" (Lil Nas X featuring Megan Thee Stallion)	2021	47	17	—	43	—	—		Montero
"Tales of Dominica" (Lil Nas X)	2021	86	—	—	63	—	—		Montero
"Dont Want It" (Lil Nas X)	2021	— (Note: "Dont Want It" did not chart on the Billboard Hot 100, but did peak at number one on the Bubbling Under Hot 100 chart.)	—	—	89	—	—		Montero
"Am I Dreaming" (Lil Nas X featuring Miley Cyrus)	2021	97	—	—	80	—	—		Montero
"Doom" (Juice Wrld)	2021	75	23	—	70	—	—		Fighting Demons
"Late to da Party (F*ck BET)" (Lil Nas X and YoungBoy Never Broke Again)	2022	67	16	54	42	—	—		Non-album single
"No Trespassing" (ASAP Rocky)	2026	65	22	—	72	—	—		Don't Be Dumb
