= Panini (song) =

2019 single by Lil Nas X

- DaBaby remix cover

Single by Lil Nas X

from the EP 7
- Released: June 20, 2019
- Genre: Hip hop; trap
- Length: 1:54
- Label: Columbia
- Songwriters: Montero Hill; Denzel Baptiste; David Biral; Oladipo Omishore; Kurt Cobain
- Producers: Take a Daytrip; Dot da Genius (co.)

Lil Nas X singles chronology
| "Old Town Road" (2018) | "Panini" (2019) | "Rodeo (Remix)" (2020) |

Music video
- "Panini" on YouTube

Music video
- "Panini" (Remix) on YouTube

"Panini" is a song by American rapper Lil Nas X from his second EP 7 (2019). It was released as his second single through Columbia Records on June 20, 2019. "Panini" was written by Lil Nas X himself, alongside production duo Take a Daytrip (consisting of Denzel Baptiste and David Biral) and co-producer Dot da Genius. Late singer and Nirvana frontman Kurt Cobain is also credited as a songwriter, due to the chorus containing an interpolation of the band's song "In Bloom", from their second studio album, Nevermind (1991). A remix featuring a guest appearance from American rapper DaBaby was released on September 13, 2019.

Upon its release, the song was positively received by music critics. Commercially, it charted number 5 on the US Billboard Hot 100 and number 2 on the Hot R&B/Hip-Hop Songs chart, and peaked at number 1 on the US Billboard Rhythmic chart.. The song also charted within the top 10 of four US charts and charts in Belgium, Canada, Greece, Latvia, and Lithuania. Mike Diva directed the "Panini" music video, starring Skai Jackson. Released on the 5th of September, 2019, it features her trying to outrun Lil Nas X and choreographed robots in a futuristic setting.

== Background ==
"Panini" was released by Columbia Records as Lil Nas X's second single on June 20, 2019, one day before the release of 7. Multiple music publications wrote that the chorus of the song contains an interpolation of "In Bloom", released on the 1991 album Nevermind by Nirvana and written by frontman Kurt Cobain. Lil Nas X, however, stated that the similarity between the two songs' melodies was unintentional, as he was not introduced to the band's music until after recording "Panini". Nevertheless, he later thanked Cobain's daughter, Frances Bean Cobain, for being able to interpolate "In Bloom".

"Panini" is named after the fictional cabbit bear hybrid of the same name—a character from the animated television series Chowder with the character herself being named after the Panini sandwich. It is composed in the key of F minor and employs common time meter. The synth-driven ostinato simulates the timbre of a brass instrument and implies a v-VI harmonic progression with the tonic chord momentarily bridging the other two and effectively behaving as a passing tone; a similar approach is likewise found in Toto's hit "Africa".

== Critical reception ==
Beatriz da Costa of Vibe said the track felt like "a distant cousin to Travis Scott's tasty hits", and called the track "short and enjoyable". Rosalind Faulkner of NPR said that the track and Lil Nas X proved that "he can be more than a one-hit wonder."

=== Accolades ===
| Year | Ceremony | Category | Result | Ref. |
|---|---|---|---|---|
| 2020 | Grammy Awards | Best Rap/Sung Performance | Nominated | |

== Commercial performance ==
In the United States, the song would hit number 5 on the Billboard Hot 100, number 10 on the Dance/Mix Show Airplay charts, Hot R&B/Hip-Hop Songs chart, number 14 on the R&B/Hip-Hop Airplay charts, number 6 on the Pop Airplay charts, number 2 on the Rolling Stone Top 100, and number 1 on the Rhythmic charts. By the end of 2019, the song was at number 40 on the Billboard Hot 100, number 20 on the Hot R&B/Hip-Hop Airplay charts, number 28 on the Rhythmic charts, and number 23 on the Rolling Stone Top 100. B the end of 2020, the song was at number 71 on the Billboard Hot 100, number 52 on the Hot R&B/Hip-Hop charts, and number 37 on the Mainstream Top 40 charts. The song was also certified 7× platinum by the Recording Industry Association of America (RIAA).

In the United Kingdom, the song hit number 21 on the UK singles chart. The song was also certified platinum by the British Phonographic Industry (BPI). In Australia, the song hit number 15 on the ARIA Charts and was certified platinum by the Australian Recording Industry Association (ARIA). In Canada, the song hit number 8 on the Canadian Hot 100 and was certified 4× platinum by Music Canada (MC). In Denmark, the song hit number 28 on the Hitlisten charts and was certified gold by IFPI Danmark (IFPI DEN). In France, the song hit number 93 on the SNEP charts and was certified Gold by the SNEP organization. In Ireland, the song hit number 18 on the Irish Singles Chart. In Norway, the song hit number 26 on the VG-lista charts. The song was also certified 2× platinum by IFPI Norge (IFPI NOR). In New Zealand, the song would hit number 14 on the Official Aotearoa Music Charts and would be certified 8× platinum by Recorded Music NZ (RMNZ). In Switzerland, the song hit number 43 on the Swiss Hitparade charts and was certified gold by IFPI Switzerland (IFPI SWI).

== Music video ==
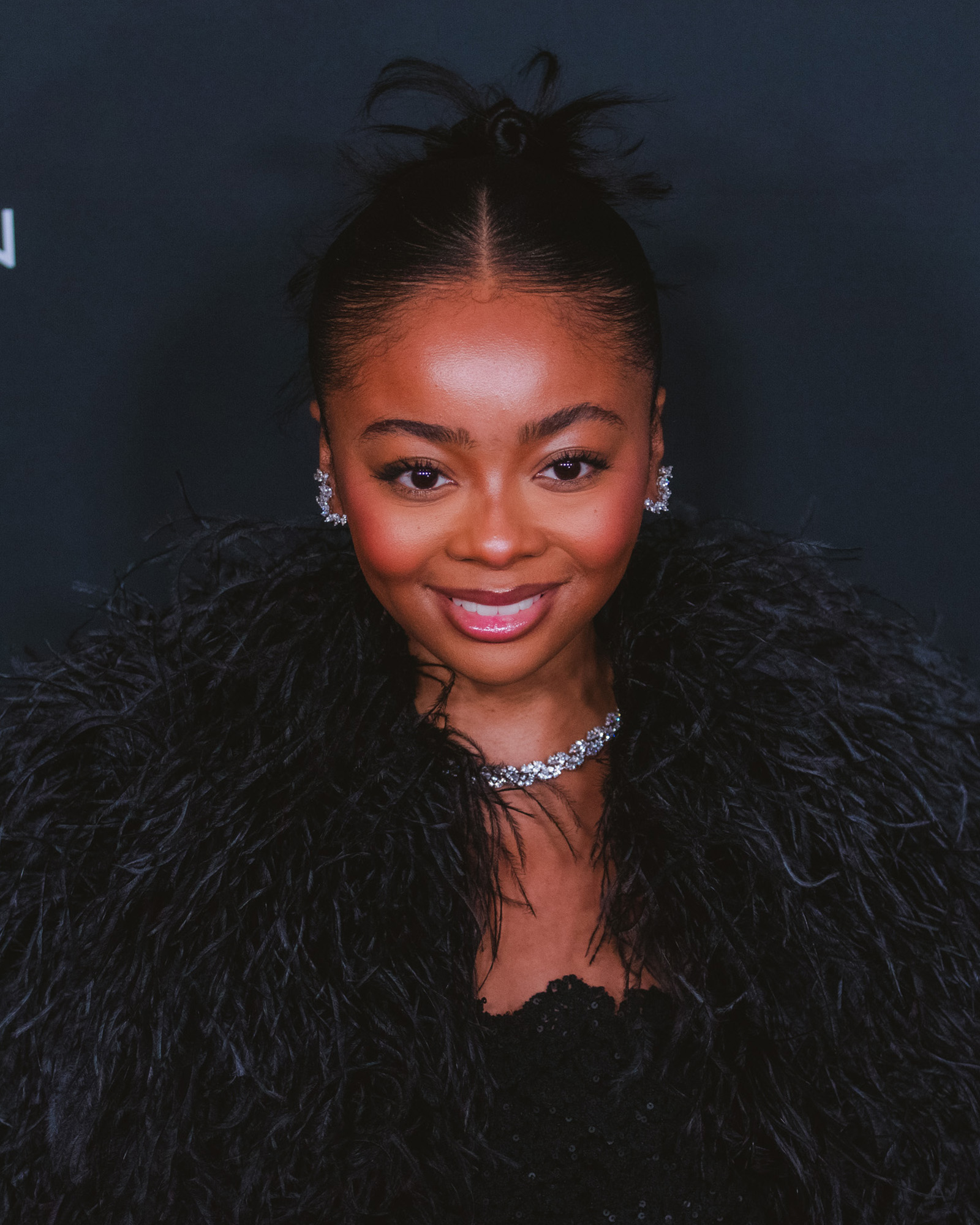
Skai Jackson appears in the video.

Mike Diva directed the music video for "Panini" starring Skai Jackson. It premiered on September 5, 2019. The video features her trying to outrun Lil Nas X and choreographed robots in a futuristic Tokyo setting. It makes use of several lights, holograms and advertisements; along with floating billboards and flying cars.

Stereogum's Tom Breihan compared the visuals to the 1982 film Blade Runner, interpreting them as "a sort of parody of what it's like to have a song that's suddenly inescapable, and for what it's like when other people have to deal with that omnipresence". Kristin Corry of Vice similarly wrote that the video could be taken metaphorically, "because his presence in it is similar to the mega-success of the ubiquitous 'Old Town Road' this summer". Writing for Vulture, Zoe Haylock praised the video by stating that its art department and visual effects team deserve "an Academy Award? Nobel Prize?".

== Remix and alternate music video ==
About a week after the "Panini" music video, the DaBaby remix of "Panini", with an animated unofficial video on Lil Nas X's YouTube channel, was released on September 13, 2019, with characters from the Cartoon Network animated series Chowder, due to the fact that a character from Chowder has the name of "Panini". The animated music video was animated and directed by Emonee Larussa, and also co-animated by Joey Prosser, Chaz Bottoms, and Fifthpower. C. H. Greenblatt, the creator of Chowder, was not involved in the production of the music video, although he praised it on his Tumblr blog. The song would hit number 14 on the New Zealand Hot Singles chart alongside the original version of the song.

== Credits and personnel ==
Credits adapted from Tidal.

- Lil Nas X – lead vocals, songwriting
- Take a Daytrip – production, songwriting
- Dot da Genius – co-production, songwriting
- Kurt Cobain – songwriting
- Thomas Cullison – assistant engineering
- Denzel Baptiste – recording
- DJ Swivel – mixing
- Colin Leonard – mastering
- DaBaby – featured vocals, songwriting (remix)

== Charts ==
=== Original version ===
==== Weekly charts ====
Weekly chart performance for "Panini"
| Chart (2019–2020) | Peak position |
|---|---|
| Australia (ARIA) | 15 |
| Austria (Ö3 Austria Top 40) | 55 |
| Belgium (Ultratop 50 Flanders) | 38 |
| Belgium (Ultratip Bubbling Under Wallonia) | 4 |
| Canada Hot 100 (Billboard) | 8 |
| Canada CHR/Top 40 (Billboard) | 39 |
| Czech Republic Singles Digital (ČNS IFPI) | 26 |
| Denmark (Tracklisten) | 28 |
| Estonia (Eesti Ekspress) | 11 |
| France (SNEP) | 93 |
| Germany (GfK) | 85 |
| Greece International Digital (IFPI Greece) | 6 |
| Hungary (Stream Top 40) | 11 |
| Iceland (Tónlistinn) | 28 |
| Ireland (IRMA) | 18 |
| Latvia (LAIPA) | 7 |
| Lithuania (AGATA) | 8 |
| Netherlands (Single Top 100) | 45 |
| New Zealand (Recorded Music NZ) | 14 |
| New Zealand Hot Singles (RMNZ) DaBaby remix | 14 |
| Norway (VG-lista) | 26 |
| Portugal (AFP) | 23 |
| Romania (Airplay 100) | 74 |
| Scotland Singles (Official Charts) | 66 |
| Singapore (RIAS) | 21 |
| Slovakia Singles Digital (ČNS IFPI) | 12 |
| Sweden (Sverigetopplistan) | 42 |
| Switzerland (Schweizer Hitparade) | 41 |
| UK Singles (Official Charts) | 21 |
| US Billboard Hot 100 | 5 |
| US Dance Airplay (Billboard) | 10 |
| US Hot R&B/Hip-Hop Songs (Billboard) | 2 |
| US R&B/Hip-Hop Airplay (Billboard) | 14 |
| US Pop Airplay (Billboard) | 6 |
| US Rhythmic Airplay (Billboard) | 1 |
| US Rolling Stone Top 100 | 2 |

=== Year-end charts ===
2019 year-end chart performance for "Panini"
| Chart (2019) | Position |
|---|---|
| Australia (ARIA) | 77 |
| Canada (Canadian Hot 100) | 40 |
| Latvia (LAIPA) | 36 |
| Portugal (AFP) | 98 |
| US Billboard Hot 100 | 40 |
| US Hot R&B/Hip-Hop Songs (Billboard) | 20 |
| US Rhythmic (Billboard) | 28 |
| US Rolling Stone Top 100 | 23 |

2020 year-end chart performance for "Panini"
| Chart (2020) | Position |
|---|---|
| US Billboard Hot 100 | 71 |
| US Hot R&B/Hip-Hop Songs (Billboard) | 52 |
| US Mainstream Top 40 (Billboard) | 37 |

== Certifications ==
Certifications and sales for "Panini"
| Region | Certification | Certified units/sales |
|---|---|---|
| Australia (ARIA) | 3× Platinum | 210,000^{‡} |
| Belgium (BRMA) | Gold | 20,000^{‡} |
| Brazil (Pro-Música Brasil) | Diamond | 160,000^{‡} |
| Canada (Music Canada) | 6× Platinum | 480,000^{‡} |
| Denmark (IFPI Danmark) | Gold | 45,000^{‡} |
| France (SNEP) | Gold | 100,000^{‡} |
| Italy (FIMI) | Gold | 35,000^{‡} |
| Mexico (AMPROFON) | Gold | 30,000^{‡} |
| New Zealand (RMNZ) | 2× Platinum | 60,000^{‡} |
| Norway (IFPI Norway) | Platinum | 60,000^{‡} |
| Poland (ZPAV) | Platinum | 20,000^{‡} |
| Portugal (AFP) | Platinum | 10,000^{‡} |
| Spain (Promusicae) | Gold | 30,000^{‡} |
| Switzerland (IFPI Switzerland) | Gold | 10,000^{‡} |
| United Kingdom (BPI) | Platinum | 600,000^{‡} |
| United States (RIAA) | 7× Platinum | 7,000,000^{‡} |
^{‡} Sales+streaming figures based on certification alone.

== Release history ==
Release dates for "Panini"
| Region | Date | Format | Label | Ref. |
|---|---|---|---|---|
| Various | June 20, 2019 | Digital download; streaming | Columbia | |
| United States | July 2, 2019 | Rhythmic contemporary | Columbia | |
| United States | July 9, 2019 | Contemporary hit radio | Columbia | |
| United States | October 7, 2019 | Hot adult contemporary | Columbia | |
