= Late to da Party =

2022 single by Lil Nas X and YoungBoy Never Broke Again

"Late to da Party (F*ck BET)"

Single by Lil Nas X and YoungBoy Never Broke Again
- Released: June 24, 2022
- Length: 3:00
- Label: Columbia
- Songwriters: Montero Hill; Kentrell Gaulden; David Biral; Denzel Baptiste; Jason Goldberg
- Producers: Take a Daytrip; Cheese

Lil Nas X singles chronology
| "Lost in the Citadel" (2022) | "Late to da Party (F*ck BET)" (2022) | "Star Walkin' (League of Legends Worlds Anthem)" (2022) |

YoungBoy Never Broke Again singles chronology
| "All My Shit Is Stupid" (2022) | "Late to da Party (F*ck BET)" (2022) | "I Don't Talk" (2022) |

Music video
- "Late to da Party" on YouTube

"Late to da Party (F*ck BET)" is a single by American rappers Lil Nas X and YoungBoy Never Broke Again. It was released as a single through Columbia Records on June 24, 2022. Lil Nas X and YoungBoy wrote the song with producers Take a Daytrip (David Biral and Denzel Baptiste) and Cheese.

== Background ==
After Lil Nas X received no nominations at the BET Awards 2022, he took to Twitter to explain that he felt he was overlooked due to a "bigger problem of homophobia in the black community" and then previewed a track containing the repeated phrase "fuck BET". The phrase appeared in censored form on the original version of the single's artwork, which was later replaced by an image of a man urinating on a BET Award placed in a toilet.

== Release and promotion ==
Lil Nas X promoted the song by announcing humorous fake brand collaborations with Grindr, McDonald's and the "homophobic dog" meme, among others, offering numerous "free" benefits if one pre-saved the song. On June 24, 2022, "Late To Da Party" was released on all main streaming platforms. On the same day, Lil Nas X uploaded the song's music video on YouTube.

== Charts ==
Chart performance for "Late to da Party"
| Chart (2022) | Peak position |
|---|---|
| Australia (ARIA) | 54 |
| Canada Hot 100 (Billboard) | 42 |
| Global 200 (Billboard) | 77 |
| Ireland (IRMA) | 83 |
| Lithuania (AGATA) | 86 |
| New Zealand Hot Singles (RMNZ) | 6 |
| Sweden Heatseeker (Sverigetopplistan) | 15 |
| US Billboard Hot 100 | 67 |
| US Hot R&B/Hip-Hop Songs (Billboard) | 16 |

== Release history ==
Release dates and formats for "Late to da Party"
| Region | Date | Format(s) | Label | Ref. |
|---|---|---|---|---|
| Various | June 24, 2022 | Digital download; streaming | Columbia | |
| Italy | July 8, 2022 | Radio airplay | Sony Italy | |
