= Say What You Will (song) =

2021 single by James Blake

Single by James Blake

from the album Friends That Break Your Heart
- Released: 22 July 2021
- Length: 4:40
- Label: Republic; Polydor
- Songwriter(s): James Blake Litherland; Dominic Maker; Josh Stadlen
- Producer(s): James Blake; Dominic Maker (co.); Josh Stadlen (add.); Jameela Jamil (add.)

James Blake singles chronology
"The First Time Ever I Saw Your Face" (2020)	"Say What You Will" (2021)	"Life Is Not the Same" (2021)

Music video
- "Say What You Will" on YouTube

"Say What You Will" is a song by English singer-songwriter and electronic music producer James Blake. It was written by Blake, Dominic Maker and Josh Stadlen. Its production was handled by Blake with co-producer Dominic Maker and additional production from Josh Stadlen and Jameela Jamil. The song was released on 22 July 2021 through Republic and Polydor Records, as the lead single from Blake's fifth studio album Friends That Break Your Heart.

== Composition ==
Upon its release, Blake revealed that the song was about "finding peace with who you are and where you're at regardless of how well other people seem to be doing, and the endless feeling of comparison."

On his album commentary with Apple Music, Blake noted the track as "favorite song written in years". He further added:

"It's the song that carries the most meaning in terms of my overall life. It’s more representative of my headspace as a whole, and I like songs that have a wider commentary baked into them. I was pleased with the reaction to it because I really tried to communicate where I am right now in an authentic way. At this point in my career, it can't be any other way. The formula to putting a song out has never changed. A good song will out in every single scenario. It needs to resonate with people, or it will disappear. And I know that feeling—I have released songs that for whatever reason have not resonated with people."

Kitty Empire of The Guardian called the song as "a mellow anthem about self-worth". Andrew Ryce of Resident Advisor described the track as "an elegant and hopeful song about self-acceptance". Ella Kemp of NME called the track found Blake "at peace with potential haters, relishing criticism and setting himself free by choosing, quite simply, not to care anymore".

== Release ==
Blake announced the single on his Instagram, by sharing a photo of himself in front of a spread of magazines with music video co-star Finneas' face on the covers. "Say What You Will" premiered on BBC Radio 1's Future Sounds with Annie Mac.

== Reception ==
"Say What You Will" received generally positive reviews from music critics. Andrea Cleary of The Irish Times praised Blake's vocal performances and compared it to Minnie Riperton. Nathan Evans of Clash called the track "shows off the magic trick Blake's perfected by now" and commended Blake's vocal performances, described it as "unsettingly beautiful". David Smyth of Evening Standard noted Blake's vocal experimentation on the song. Shaad D'Souza of Pitchfork called the song as the most "arresting" track of its parent album Friends That Break Your Heart.

== Music video ==
An accompanying music video for "Say What You Will" was uploaded to Blake's official YouTube channel on 22 July 2021. It was directed by Bear Damen. The video stars singer and actor Finneas, alongside Blake. In the video, Blake dramatizes his inferiority complex opposite Finneas.

== Live performances ==
Blake performed the track for the first time as an unreleased song during a concert at the Harvey Theater in Brooklyn, New York, United States on 17 December 2019. He also performed it during an Instagram Live session on 6 April 2020.

After the single release, Blake performed "Say What You Will" on the late-night talk show Jimmy Kimmel Live! on 16 September 2021. He also included the song on the setlist of his Friends That Break Your Heart Tour (2021).
