= 7 (Lil Nas X EP) =

EP by Lil Nas X
- Released: June 21, 2019
- Recorded: December 2018 – June 2019
- Genres: Pop-rap; pop rock; hip hop; country rap
- Length: 18:44
- Label: Columbia
- Producers: Abaz; Allen Ritter; Alone in a Boy Band; Atticus Ross; Bizness Boi; Boi-1da; Dot da Genius; Fwdslxsh; Jahaan Sweet; Lil Nas X; Roy Lenzo; Russ Chell; Ryan Tedder; Take a Daytrip; Travis Barker; Trent Reznor; Zach Skelton; X-Plosive; YoungKio

Lil Nas X chronology
October 31st (2018)	7 (2019)	Montero (2021)

Singles from 7
- 1. "Old Town Road" Released: December 3, 2018; 2. "Old Town Road (Remix)" Released: April 5, 2019; 3. "Panini" Released: June 20, 2019

7 is the second extended play (EP) and major label debut by American rapper Lil Nas X. The EP was released on June 21, 2019, by Columbia Records. The EP was recorded from December 2018 to June 2019, and features production credits from Travis Barker of Blink-182, Ryan Tedder of OneRepublic, Boi-1da, Dot da Genius, Take a Daytrip, Allen Ritter, Jahaan Sweet, YoungKio, and Lil Nas X himself. The extended play features guest appearances from Barker, alongside Billy Ray Cyrus and Cardi B.

The EP was preceded by four singles. The first was "Old Town Road", which would become Lil Nas X's breakout hit when released on December 3, 2018. The second single was a remix of "Old Town Road" featuring Billy Ray Cyrus, released on April 5, 2019. This track would become the opening track of the EP, with the final track being the original song. The third single was "Panini", released on June 20, 2019, and became the final single for the EP. "Rodeo", although not released as a single, did receive a remix featuring Nas, which was released as a single on January 27, 2020.

Despite receiving a mixed reception from critics, 7 received six Grammy Award nominations, including a nomination for Album of the Year. At under 19 minutes, it is the shortest album release to be nominated for the Grammy Award. As for chart success, the EP peaked at number 2 on the Billboard 200, alongside hitting the top 10 in five other countries, including Australia, Denmark, New Zealand, Sweden, and Canada (where the EP hit number one). The album would also be certified Platinum in four countries (including the United States and Canada, where the record was certified 2× Platinum) and would be certified Gold in three countries.

== Background ==
While recording the EP, Lil Nas X deliberately avoided producing an EP full of country rap songs, not wanting to be pigeonholed by the success of "Old Town Road". Despite this, he would include one other country song, "Rodeo", only after producers Take a Daytrip earned his trust by giving him the beat for "Panini". Several trap beats were also sent to the singer for consideration, which he rejected as he did not want to be a "trap artist". While in the process of recording the songs, Lil Nas X posted previews of both "Panini" and "Rodeo" to his social media accounts before either song were completely written. This caused some problems for producers Take a Daytrip as the popularity of these snippets meant that much of the work had to be "locked in" so the resulting songs would match the previews.

Lil Nas X announced the 7 EP on May 18, 2019, on all social media platforms along with its June 2019 release date. This teaser included the snippet of a song described by Spin's Rob Arcand as "singing a trap-pop hook through a slurred AutoTune drawl". Lil Nas X stated that the EP would include a collaboration with "one of [his] favorite artists ever".

== Songs ==
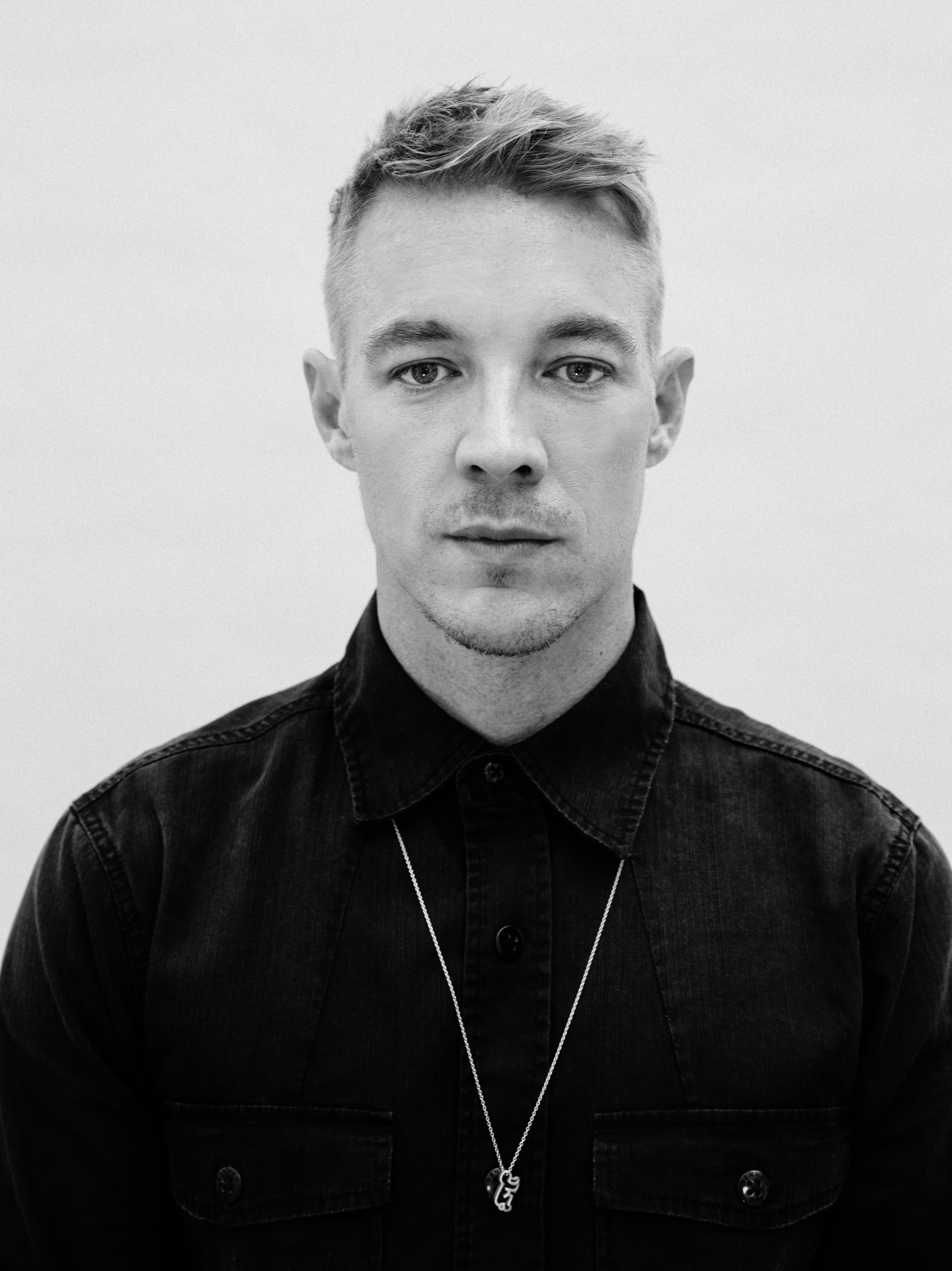
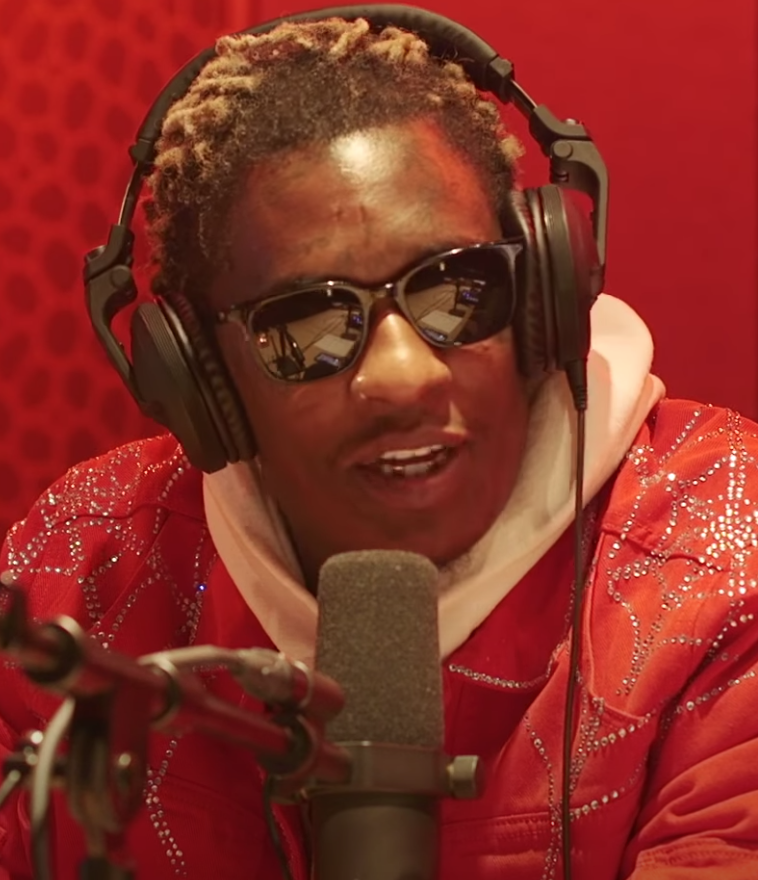
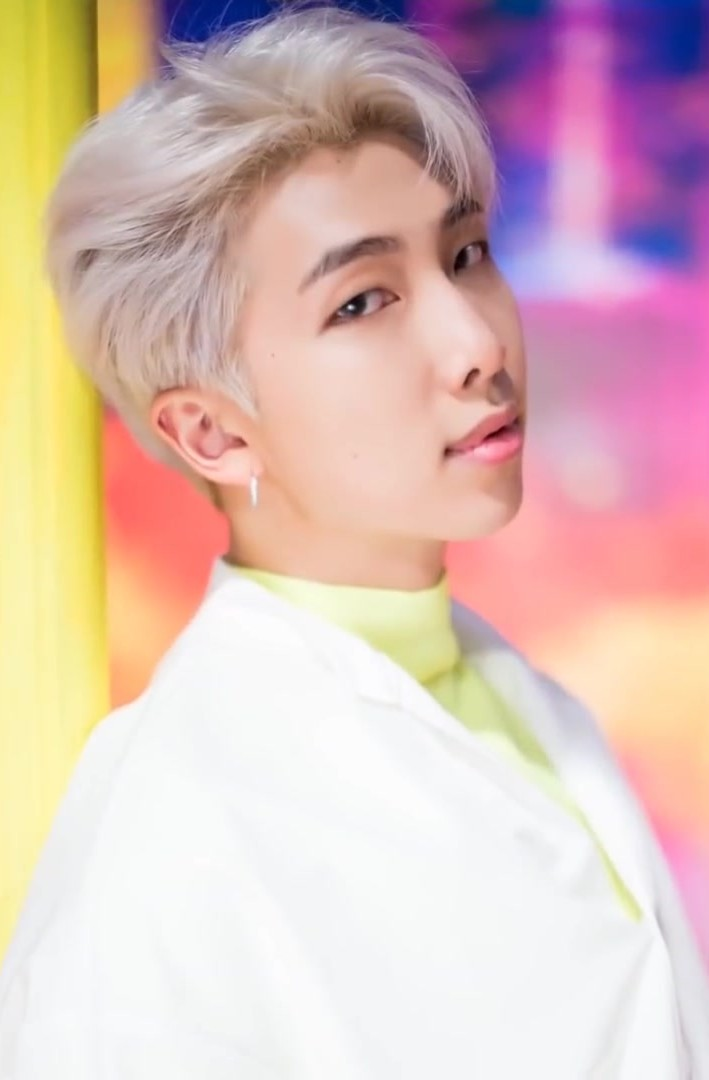
Alongside Billy Ray Cyrus, American producer Diplo, American rapper Young Thug and South Korean rapper RM (of BTS) appeared on remixes of "Old Town Road". Young Thug appeared alongside American singer Mason Ramsey and RM's remix (called "Seoul Town Road") was the final remix for the song.

"Old Town Road" was released as the lead single from the EP on the 3rd of December, 2018. The track would become a huge hit, peaking at the top of the US Billboard Hot 100. A remix featuring Billy Ray Cyrus was released as a single on the 5th of April, 2019, spending a record 19 weeks at the top. Other remixes for the song included artists such as Diplo, Young Thug, Mason Ramsey, and RM of BTS (the latter remix called "Seoul Town Road"). Other remixes featuring Jake Owen and Lil Wayne were recorded, although they were not released. The song would generate controversy when it was left off of the US Billboard Hot Country Songs chart due to not "fitting" the genre. Despite this, the song would still gain popularity, and would win 14 awards, including two Grammy Awards and four awards at the BMA's. The music video for the song was released on YouTube, on the 17th of May, 2019, and has accumulated over 721,000,000 views and around 13,000,000 likes as of 2025. A shorter version of the video became Lil Nas X's most viewed video on the platform and has received over 1,400,000,000 views and around 14,000,000 likes as of 2025.

"Panini" was released as the third single from the EP on the 20th of June, 2019, the day before the EP was released, and would become Lil Nas X's second hit, peaking at number five on the Billboard Hot 100. The song would be remixed with DaBaby as a feature, with the DaBaby remix releasing on the 13th of September, 2019. The original version's music video has accumulated over 497,000,000 views and around 7,400,000 likes as of 2025, with the lyric video for its remix gaining over 32,000,000 views and around 867,000 likes as of 2025. "Rodeo", originally featuring Cardi B, was not made a single until a remix featuring Nas was released on January 27, 2020, one day after it was performed at the Grammys. The remix peaked at number 22 on the Billboard Hot 100 and was used for the music video in which Nas makes an appearance. The official audio for the original version currently has over 98,000,000 views and around 1,800,000 likes as of 2025, with the music video for the remix gaining over 181,000,000 views and around 2,900,000 likes as of 2025.

Every other song from the EP would also hit the charts. "F9mily (You & Me)", featuring Blink-182 drummer Travis Barker, would hit number 34 on the Official Aotearoa Music Charts in New Zealand and number 97 in the Rolling Stone Top 100, "Kick It" would hit number 33 on the Official Aotearoa Music Charts, "C7osure (You Like)" (where Lil Nas X came out as gay) hit number 27 on the Official Aotearoa Music Charts, number 60 on the LTU charts in Lithuania, and number 14 on the Bubbling Under Hot 100 charts, and "Bring U Down" peaked at number 7 on the Hot Rock Songs chart.

== Critical reception ==
Professional ratings
Aggregate scores
Source	Rating
Metacritic	57/100
Review scores
Source	Rating
AllMusic	3/5 stars
Consequence	C+
Pitchfork	4.3/10
Rolling Stone	3/5 stars

7 received mixed reviews from critics. At Metacritic, which assigns a normalized rating out of 100 to reviews from mainstream publications, 7 received an average score of 57, based on 11 reviews, indicating "mixed or average reviews". Mikael Wood at the Los Angeles Times considered it among the best debut efforts of the year, calling the songs on 7 "vivid, funny, full of feeling and supremely catchy, even if they don't quite offer a clear picture of who Lil Nas X is offstage or off-screen." Brittany Spanos, writing for Rolling Stone praised the EP's "carefully balanced earnestness and playfulness," but agreed with Wood: "Still, it leaves more questions than answers about what and who Lil Nas X wants to be."

In a mixed review, Garrett Gravley at Consequence of Sound described the EP as a "musical Chex Mix — lightweight and best consumed in selective increments, but also strangely addictive." Other reviews were more negative. Brian Josephs at Entertainment Weekly criticized its "failed versatility", summarizing by saying, "With 7, there's too little conviction to tell if a full project is something Lil Nas X wants to do. At best, there's a set of half-considered songs." Alphonse Pierre gave it a poor review for Pitchfork, commenting, "For the entirety of 7, it's unclear if Lil Nas X actually likes music [...] The EP ends up being a set of nothingness [...] content made for the sake of justifying its existence."

=== Accolades ===
Accolades for 7
Award	Year	Category	Result
Grammy Awards	2020	Album of the Year	Nominated

== Commercial performance ==
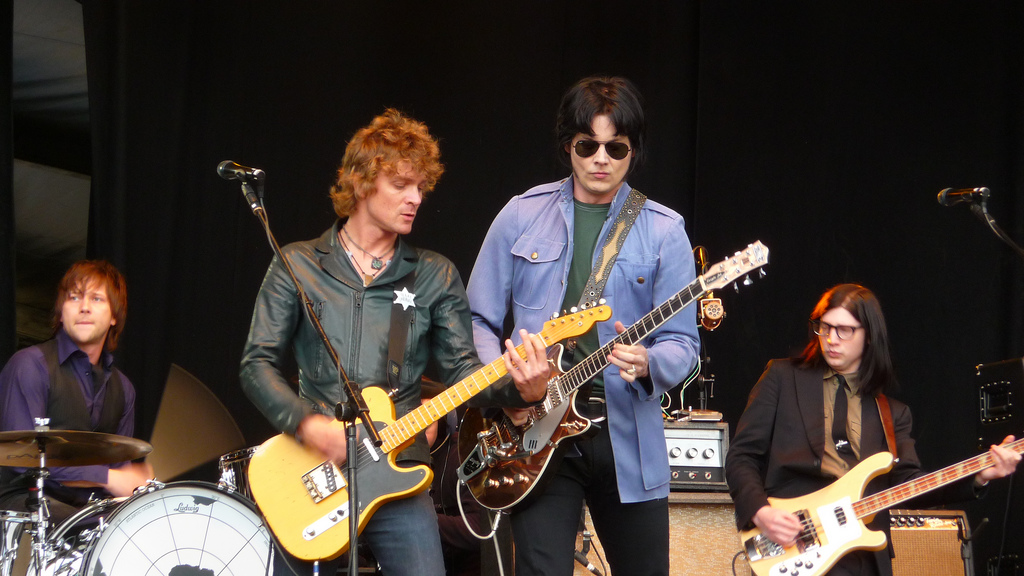
The Raconteurs (pictured performing at T in the Park 2008), who blocked 7 from hitting the number one spot on the Billboard 200

=== United States of America ===
7 debuted at number two on the US Billboard 200 (just behind Jack White's The Raconteurs and their third studio album Help Us Stranger) with 77,000 album-equivalent units (including 4,000 pure album sales). In its second week, the EP remained at number two on Billboard 200, with 62,800 units. Additionally, the EP would chart at the top of the Top R&B/Hip-Hop Albums chart. The EP would later be certified 2× Platinum in the US, specifically by the Recording Industry Association of America (RIAA).

=== Other countries ===
The EP also charted in Australia on the ARIA Charts, peaking at number 5 on the charts. In Austria, the EP charted at number 53 on the Ö3 Austria Top 40, becoming Lil Nas X's only charting release in that country. In Canada, the EP made it to the top of the Billboard Canadian Albums, selling 154,000 copies, 1,000 copies consisting of pure album sales, and was certified 2× Platinum by Music Canada. In Denmark, the EP peaked at number 9 on Hitlisten and certifying Gold by the International Federation of the Phonographic Industry in that country (IFPI Denmark).

In France, the EP peaked at number 15 on the SNEP charts and was certified Gold by the same organization. In Ireland, the EP peaked at number 11 on their Irish Albums Chart. In New Zealand, the EP peaked at number 5 on the Official Aotearoa Music Charts and was certified gold by Recorded Music NZ. In Sweden, the EP charted at number 10 on the Sverigetopplistan charts. In the United Kingdom, the EP peaked at number 23 on their Official Albums Chart. The EP was also certified Platinum by the IFPI in Norway and Switzerland.

== Track listing ==
Adapted from Tidal.

7 track listing
No.	Title	Writer(s)	Producer(s)	Length
1.	"Old Town Road" (remix; featuring Billy Ray Cyrus)	Montero Hill; William Cyrus; Kiowa Roukema; Jocelyn Donald; Michael Reznor^{[c]}; Atticus Ross^{[c]}	YoungKio; Ross^{[c]}; Reznor^{[c]}	2:37
2.	"Panini"	Hill; Denzel Baptiste; David Biral; Oladipo Omishore; Kurt Cobain^{[d]}	Take a Daytrip; Dot da Genius	1:55
3.	"F9mily (You & Me)" (featuring Travis Barker)	Hill; Travis Barker; Matt Malpass	Barker	2:43
4.	"Kick It"	Hill; Andre Robertson; Darien Bankhead; Yinka Bankole	Lil Nas X; Bizness Boi; Fwdslxsh; Alone in a Boy Band; Danny Win	2:22
5.	"Rodeo" (with Cardi B)	Hill; Belcalis Almánzar; Baptiste; Biral; Roy Lenzo; Russ Chell; Jordan Thorpe; Michael Derosier; Ann Wilson; Nancy Wilson; Roger Fisher	Take a Daytrip; Lenzo; Chell	2:39
6.	"Bring U Down"	Hill; Ryan Tedder; Zach Skelton	Tedder; Skelton	2:12
7.	"C7osure (You Like)"	Hill; Allen Ritter; Matthew Samuels; Imran Abbas; Jahaan Sweet; Thomas Kessler	Ritter; Boi-1da; Abaz^{[a]}; Sweet^{[a]}; X-Plosive^{[b]}	2:23
8.	"Old Town Road"	Hill; Roukema; Reznor^{[c]}; Ross^{[c]}	YoungKio; Ross^{[c]}; Reznor^{[c]}	1:53
Total length:				18:44

=== Notes ===
- ^{^[a]} signifies a miscellaneous producer
- ^{^[b]} signifies an uncredited producer

==== Sample credits ====
- ^{^[c]} Both iterations of "Old Town Road" contain a sample of "34 Ghosts IV", written by Trent Reznor and Atticus Ross, and performed by Nine Inch Nails.
- ^{^[d]} "Panini" contains an interpolation of "In Bloom", written by Kurt Cobain, and performed by Nirvana.

== Personnel ==
Credits adapted from Tidal.

=== Musicians ===
- Lil Nas X – lead vocals, production (track 4)
- Cardi B – lead vocals (track 5)
- Billy Ray Cyrus – featured vocals (track 1)
- Jocelyn "Jozzy" Donald – background vocals (track 1)
- Ryan Tedder – background vocals (track 6), production (track 6), bass (track 6), drums (track 6), guitar (track 6)
- Zach Skelton – background vocals (track 6), production (track 6), bass (track 6), drums (track 6), electric guitar (track 6)
- YoungKio – production (tracks 1, 8)
- Atticus Ross – production (tracks 1, 8)
- Trent Reznor – background vocals, production (tracks 1, 8)
- Take a Daytrip – production (tracks 2, 5)
- Travis Barker – drums, production (track 3)
- Bizness Boi – production (track 4)
- fwdslxsh – production (track 4)
- Alone In A Boy Band – production (track 4)
- Roy Lenzo – production (track 5)
- Russ Chell – production (track 5)
- Boi-1da – production (track 7)
- Allen Ritter – production (track 7)
- Dot da Genius – co-production (track 2)
- Abaz – miscellaneous production (track 7)
- X-Plosive – miscellaneous production (track 7)
- Jahaan Sweet – miscellaneous production (track 7)
- Stephen "Johan" Feigenbaum – strings (track 4)
- Yasmeen Al-Mazeedi – violin (track 4)
- Eddie Benjamin – bass (track 6)
- Danny Win – saxophone (track 4)

=== Technical ===
- Andrew "VoxGod" Bolooki – vocal production, mixing (track 1)
- Joe Grasso – engineering (track 1)
- Thomas Cullison – assistant engineering (track 2), recording (track 4)
- Andy Rodríguez – assistant engineering (track 4)
- Jeremie Inhaber – assistant engineering (track 6)
- Robin Florent – assistant engineering (track 6)
- Scott Desmarais – assistant engineering (track 6)
- Cinco – recording (track 1)
- Denzel Baptiste – recording (track 2, 5)
- Matt Malpass – recording (track 3)
- Jordan "DJ Swivel" Young – mixing (tracks 2, 5)
- Joe Grasso – mixing (tracks 3, 4)
- Eric Lagg – mastering (tracks 1, 3, 4)
- Colin Leonard – mastering (tracks 2, 5)

== Charts ==
=== Weekly charts ===
Weekly chart performance for 7
Chart (2019)	Peak position
Australian Albums (ARIA)	5
Austrian Albums (Ö3 Austria)	72
Belgian Albums (Ultratop Flanders)	15
Belgian Albums (Ultratop Wallonia)	43
Canadian Albums (Billboard)	1
Danish Albums (Hitlisten)	9
Finnish Albums (Suomen virallinen lista)	8
French Albums (SNEP)	15
German Albums (Offizielle Top 100)	99
Icelandic Albums (Tónlistinn)	4
Irish Albums (Official Charts)	11
Italian Albums (FIMI)	43
Latvian Albums (LAIPA)	2
Lithuanian Albums (AGATA)	1
New Zealand Albums (RMNZ)	5
Swedish Albums (Sverigetopplistan)	10
Swiss Albums (Schweizer Hitparade)	63
UK Albums (Official Charts)	23
US Billboard 200	2
US Top R&B/Hip-Hop Albums (Billboard)	1

=== Year-end charts ===
Annual chart performance for 7
Chart (2019)	Position
Australian Albums (ARIA)	99
Belgian Albums (Ultratop Flanders)	130
Belgian Albums (Ultratop Wallonia)	196
Canadian Albums (Billboard)	28
Danish Albums (Hitlisten)	73
French Albums (SNEP)	93
Icelandic Albums (Tónlistinn)	25
Swedish Albums (Sverigetopplistan)	46
US Billboard 200	46
US Top R&B/Hip-Hop Albums (Billboard)	21

Chart (2020)	Position
Icelandic Albums (Tónlistinn)	94
US Billboard 200	79
US Top R&B/Hip-Hop Albums (Billboard)	49

== Certifications and sales ==
Region	Certification	Certified units/sales
Brazil (Pro-Música Brasil)	3× Platinum	120,000^{‡}
Canada (Music Canada)	2× Platinum	154,000
Denmark (IFPI Danmark)	Platinum	20,000^{‡}
France (SNEP)	Gold	50,000^{‡}
Iceland (FHF)	—	1,502
Mexico (AMPROFON)	Gold	30,000^{‡}
New Zealand (RMNZ)	Gold	7,500^{‡}
Norway (IFPI Norway)	Platinum	20,000^{‡}
Poland (ZPAV)	Platinum	20,000^{‡}
Singapore (RIAS)	Gold	5,000^{*}
Switzerland (IFPI Switzerland)	Platinum	20,000^{‡}
United Kingdom (BPI)	Silver	60,000^{‡}
United States (RIAA)	2× Platinum	2,000,000^{‡}
^{*} Sales figures based on certification alone.^{‡} Sales+streaming figures based on certification alone.
