= Lil Nas X discography =

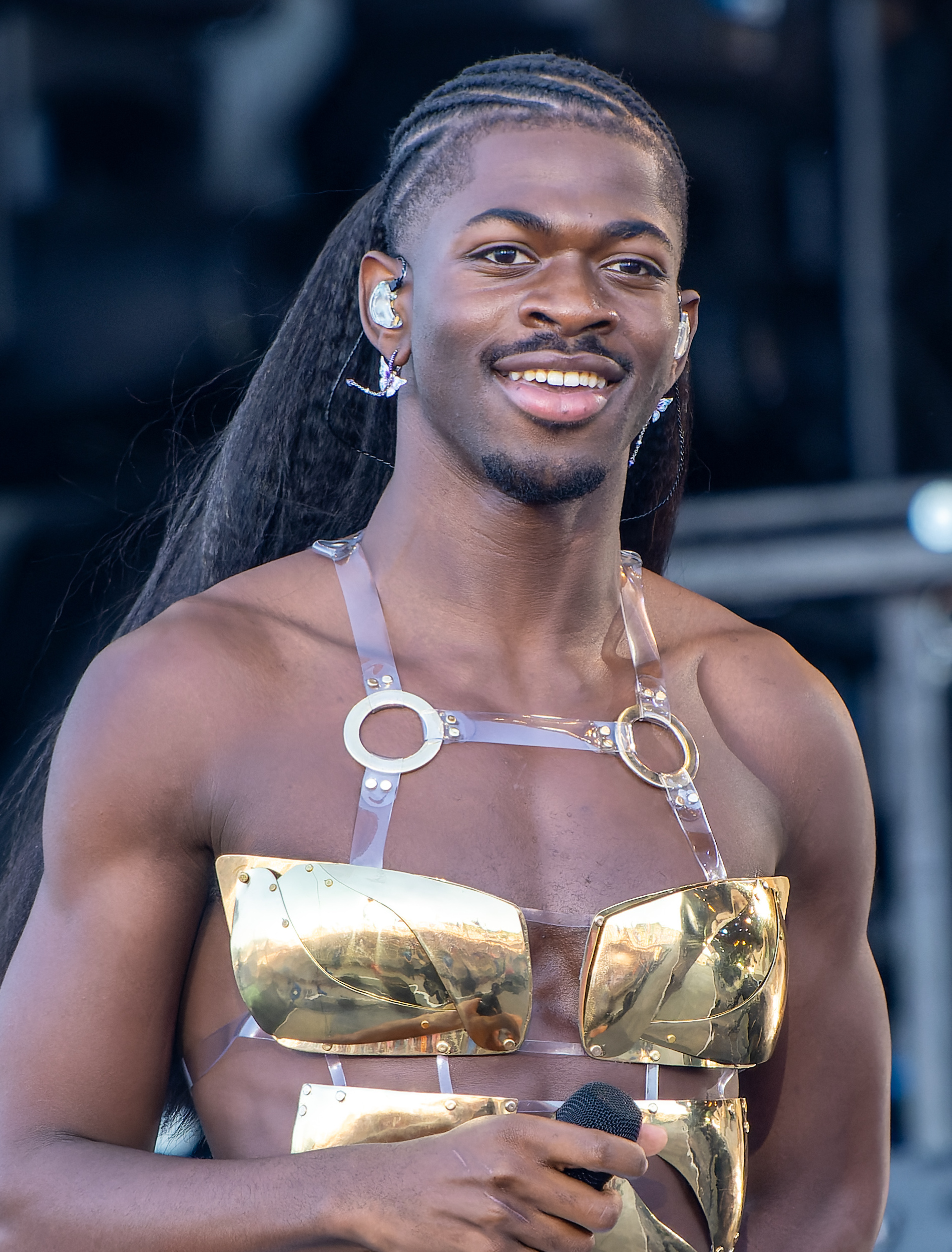
- Lil Nas X at Glastonbury Festival 2023
- Studio albums: 1
- EPs: 3
- Singles: 24
- Mixtapes: 1
- Promotional singles: 6

American rapper and singer-songwriter Lil Nas X has released one studio album, three extended plays (EP), one mixtape, 24 singles (including three as a featured artist), and six promotional singles. The release of his country rap single "Old Town Road", achieved viral popularity in early 2019 and climbed the music charts internationally and became diamond certified by November of that same year. (Note: Diamond Certified is moving ten million certified units – streaming and sales combined.) Lil Nas X released his second EP, titled 7 in 2019 through Columbia Records. Two more singles were released from the EP—"Panini" and "Rodeo". The former charted at number 5 on the Billboard Hot 100, while the latter peaked within the top 25. Both songs were remixed with additional verses from DaBaby and Nas respectively.

His debut studio album, Montero, was released in 2021 through Columbia Records. The album was preceded by the Hot 100 chart-topping singles "Montero (Call Me by Your Name)" and "Industry Baby", as well as "Sun Goes Down". On the same day as the album, its fourth single, "Thats What I Want", was released, peaking at number 8 on the Hot 100. A fifth and final single, "Lost in the Citadel", was also released, peaking at number 60. In 2024, "J Christ" was released, which charted at number 69 on the Hot 100. That same year, "Light Again!", the lead single to his upcoming second studio album, Dreamboy, was released. This was followed up by a series of promotional singles, which preceded the album's second single, "Hotbox", released in 2025.

== Studio albums ==
List of studio albums, with selected details, chart positions, and certifications
Title	Details	Peak chart positions										Pure sales	Certifications
Title	Details	US	AUS	CAN	FRA	IRE	NOR	NZ	SWE	SWI	UK	Pure sales	Certifications
Montero	Released: September 17, 2021; Label: Columbia; Formats: Digital download, streaming	2	1	2	6	1	1	1	1	6	2	US: 22,000; WW: 126,000	RIAA: 2× Platinum; ARIA: Gold; BPI: Gold; GLF: Platinum; IFPI DEN: Platinum; IFPI NOR: Platinum; IFPI SWI: Platinum; MC: 2× Platinum; RMNZ: Platinum; SNEP: Gold
Dreamboy	To be released; Label: Columbia; Formats: Digital download, streaming	To be released											

== EPs ==
List of extended plays, with selected details, chart positions, sales, and certifications
Title	Details	Peak chart positions										Pure sales	Certifications
Title	Details	US	AUS	AUT	CAN	DEN	FRA	IRE	NZ	SWE	UK	Pure sales	Certifications
October 31st	Released: October 16, 2018; Label: Self-released; Formats: Digital download, streaming	—	—	—	—	—	—	—	—	—	—		
7	Released: June 21, 2019; Label: Columbia; Formats: Digital download, streaming	2	5	53	1	9	15	11	5	10	23	US: 4,000; CAN: 1,000	RIAA: 2× Platinum; BPI: Silver; IFPI DEN: Gold; IFPI NOR: Platinum; IFPI SWI: Platinum; MC: 2× Platinum; RMNZ: Gold; SNEP: Gold
Days Before Dreamboy	Released: March 28, 2025; Label: Columbia; Formats: Digital download, streaming	—	—	—	—	—	—	—	—	—	—		
"—" denotes a recording that did not chart or was not released in that territory.

== Mixtapes ==
List of mixtapes, with selected details
Title	Details
Nasarati	Released: July 24, 2018; Label: Self-released; Formats: Digital download, streaming

== Singles ==
=== As lead artist ===
List of singles as lead artist, showing year released, with selected chart positions, certifications, and album name
Title	Year	Peak chart positions										Certifications	Album
Title	Year	US	AUS	CAN	DEN	FRA	IRE	NOR	NZ	SWI	UK	Certifications	Album
"Carry On"	2018	—	—	—	—	—	—	—	—	—	—		Nasarati
"Sonic Shit"	2018	—	—	—	—	—	—	—	—	—	—		Nasarati
"Thanos (Blow It)"	2018	—	—	—	—	—	—	—	—	—	—		Nasarati
"Donald Trump"	2018	—	—	—	—	—	—	—	—	—	—		Nasarati
"Same Shit (Freestyle)"	2018	—	—	—	—	—	—	—	—	—	—		October 31st
"Old Town Road" (solo or remix featuring Billy Ray Cyrus)	2018	1	1	1	1	1	1	1	1	1	1	RIAA: 17× Platinum; ARIA: 15× Platinum; BPI: 5× Platinum; IFPI DEN: 2× Platinum; IFPI NOR: 2× Platinum; IFPI NOR: 2× Platinum (remix); IFPI SWI: 5× Platinum; MC: Diamond; RMNZ: 8× Platinum; RMNZ: 4× Platinum (remix); SNEP: Diamond	7
"Panini" (solo or remix with DaBaby)	2019	5	15	8	28	93	18	26	14	43	21	RIAA: 7× Platinum; ARIA: 3× Platinum; BPI: Platinum; IFPI DEN: Gold; IFPI NOR: Platinum; IFPI SWI: Gold; MC: 4× Platinum; RMNZ: 2× Platinum; SNEP: Gold	7
"Rodeo (Remix)" (with Nas)	2020	74	—	—	—	—	—	—	— (Note: "Rodeo" (with Nas) did not enter the NZ Top 40 Singles Chart, but reached number 27 on the NZ Hot Singles Chart.)	—	—		Non-album singles
"Holiday"	2020	37	42	26	—	70	18	10	— (Note: "Holiday" did not enter the NZ Top 40 Singles Chart, but peaked at number 10 on the NZ Hot Singles Chart.)	26	23	RIAA: 2× Platinum; ARIA: Platinum; BPI: Silver; IFPI NOR: Platinum; IFPI SWI: Gold; MC: Gold; RMNZ: Platinum	Non-album singles
"Montero (Call Me by Your Name)"	2021	1	1	1	2	1	1	1	2	2	1	RIAA: 7× Platinum; ARIA: 5× Platinum; BPI: 2× Platinum; IFPI DEN: Platinum; IFPI NOR: 2× Platinum; IFPI SWI: 2× Platinum; MC: 7× Platinum; RMNZ: 4× Platinum; SNEP: Diamond	Montero
"Sun Goes Down"	2021	66	74	41	—	150	35	—	— (Note: "Sun Goes Down" did not enter the NZ Top 40 Singles Chart, but peaked at number six on the NZ Hot Singles Chart.)	85	42	RIAA: Gold; MC: Gold	Montero
"Industry Baby" (with Jack Harlow)	2021	1	4	3	4	3	2	3	1	4	3	RIAA: 7× Platinum; ARIA: 7× Platinum; BPI: Platinum; IFPI DEN: Platinum; IFPI NOR: Platinum; IFPI SWI: 2× Platinum; MC: 3× Platinum; RMNZ: 4× Platinum; SNEP: Diamond	Montero
"Thats What I Want"	2021	8	7	5	8	39	3	7	6	12	10	RIAA: 3× Platinum; ARIA: 4× Platinum; BPI: Platinum; IFPI DEN: Platinum; IFPI NOR: Gold; IFPI SWI: Platinum; MC: 4× Platinum; RMNZ: 2× Platinum; SNEP: Platinum	Montero
"Lost in the Citadel"	2022	90	—	76	—	—	—	—	—	—	—		Montero
"Late to da Party (F*ck BET)" (with YoungBoy Never Broke Again)	2022	67	54	42	—	—	83	—	— (Note: "Late to da Party" did not enter the NZ Top 40 Singles Chart, but peaked at number six on the NZ Hot Singles Chart.)	—	—		Non-album singles
"Star Walkin'" (League of Legends Worlds Anthem)	2022	32	21	17	16	18	53	27	38	25	40	RIAA: Platinum; ARIA: Platinum; BPI: Silver; IFPI DEN: Gold; IFPI SWI: Gold; MC: Gold; RMNZ: Gold; SNEP: Diamond	Non-album singles
"J Christ"	2024	69	— (Note: "J Christ" did not enter the ARIA Singles Chart, but peaked at number 19 on the ARIA New Music Singles Chart.)	67	—	—	—	—	— (Note: "J Christ" did not enter the NZ Top 40 Singles Chart, but peaked at number eight on the NZ Hot Singles Chart.)	— (Note: "J Christ" did not enter the Swiss Singles chart, but peaked at number 95 on the Swiss Streaming chart.)	59		Non-album singles
"Where Do We Go Now?"	2024	—	—	—	—	—	—	—	—	—	—		Non-album singles
"Here We Go!"	2024	—	—	—	—	—	—	—	—	—	— (Note: "Here We Go!" did not enter the UK Singles Chart, but peaked at number 86 on the UK Singles Sales Chart.)		Non-album singles
"Light Again!"	2024	—	—	—	—	—	—	—	—	—	—		Days Before Dreamboy
"Hotbox"	2025	—	—	—	—	—	—	—	— (Note: "Hotbox" did not enter the NZ Top 40 Singles Chart, but peaked at number 33 on the NZ Hot Singles Chart.)	—	—		Days Before Dreamboy
"World's Greatest!"	2026	—	—	—	—	—	—	—	—	—	—		TBA
"—" denotes a recording that did not chart or was not released in that territory.

=== As featured artist ===
List of singles as featured artist, showing year released, with selected chart positions and album name
Title	Year	Peak chart positions					Album
Title	Year	US Pop	CAN CHR	JPN Over.	NZ Hot	UK Sales	Album
"Light!" (Skaiwater and 9lives featuring Lil Nas X)	2024	—	—	—	—	—	#Gigi
"Tennessee" (Kevin Abstract featuring Lil Nas X)	2024	—	—	—	—	—	Glue
"He Knows" (Camila Cabello featuring Lil Nas X)	2024	27	33	12	19	63	C,XOXO
"—" denotes a recording that did not chart or was not released in that territory.

=== Promotional singles ===
List of promotional singles, showing year released and album name
Title	Year	Album
"Shame"	2018	Non-album promotional singles
"No Love" (featuring Skaiwater)	2018	Non-album promotional singles
"Need Dat Boy"	2024	Days Before Dreamboy
"Dreamboy"	2025	Days Before Dreamboy
"Big Dummy!"	2025	Days Before Dreamboy
"Swish"	2025	Days Before Dreamboy
"Right There!"	2025	Days Before Dreamboy
"Lean on My Body"	2025	Days Before Dreamboy

== Other charted and certified songs ==
List of other charted songs, showing year released, with selected chart positions, certifications, and album name
Title	Year	Peak chart positions										Certifications	Album
Title	Year	US	CAN	FRA	LTU	NZ Hot	POR	SK	SWI Stream	UK Stream	WW	Certifications	Album
"F9mily (You & Me)" (with Travis Barker)		— (Note: "F9mily (You & Me)" did not enter the US Billboard Hot 100, but peaked at number 97 on the Rolling Stone Top 100 chart.)	—	—	—	34	—	—	—	—	—		7
"Kick It"		—	—	—	—	33	—	—	—	—	—		7
"Rodeo" (with Cardi B)	2019	22	72	44	17	111	35	— (Note: "Rodeo" did not enter the Slovak Rádio – Top 100, but peaked at number 35 on the Slovakia Singles Digital chart.)	— (Note: "Rodeo" did not enter the Swiss Streaming Top 100, but peaked at number six on the Schweizer Hitparade.)	82	—	RIAA: 2× Platinum; ARIA: Gold; BPI: Silver; MC: Platinum; RMNZ: Gold; SNEP: Gold	7
"Bring U Down"	2019	— (Note: "Bring U Down" did not enter the US Billboard Hot 100, but peaked at number 7 on the Hot Rock Songs chart.)	—	—	—	—	—	—	—	—	—		7
"C7osure (You Like)"	2019	— (Note: "C7osure (You Like)" did not enter the US Billboard Hot 100, but peaked at number 14 on the Bubbling Under Hot 100 chart.)	—	—	60	27	—	—	—	—	—		7
"Dead Right Now"	2021	72	57	153	—	—	63	—	—	—	54		Montero
"Scoop" (featuring Doja Cat)	2021	42	41	135	90	5	44	88	92	71	36	RIAA: Gold	Montero
"One of Me" (featuring Elton John)	2021	88	71	187	—	—	87	—	—	—	79		Montero
"Dolla Sign Slime" (featuring Megan Thee Stallion)	2021	47	43	178	—	—	66	—	—	—	43		Montero
"Tales of Dominica"	2021	86	63	134	—	—	74	—	—	—	73		Montero
"Void"	2021	— (Note: "Void" did not enter the US Billboard Hot 100, but peaked at number seven on the Bubbling Under Hot 100 chart.)	—	—	—	—	128	—	—	—	141		Montero
"Dont Want It"	2021	— (Note: "Dont Want It" did not enter the US Billboard Hot 100, but peaked at number one on the Bubbling Under Hot 100 chart.)	89	—	—	—	110	—	—	—	106		Montero
"Life After Salem"	2021	— (Note: "Life After Salem" did not enter the US Billboard Hot 100 but peaked at number 15 on the Bubbling Under Hot 100 chart.)	—	—	—	—	155	—	—	—	183		Montero
"Am I Dreaming" (featuring Miley Cyrus)	2021	97	80	—	—	—	79	—	—	—	89		Montero
"—" denotes a recording that did not chart

== Music videos ==
List of music videos, showing year released, other artist(s) credited and director(s)
Title	Year	Other artist(s)	Director(s)	Ref.
As lead artist
"Old Town Road (Remix)"	2019	Billy Ray Cyrus	Calmatic	
"Panini"	2019	None	Mike Diva	
"Rodeo"	2020	Nas	Bradley & Pablo	
"Holiday"	2020	None	Gibson Hazard and Lil Nas X	
"Montero (Call Me by Your Name)"	2021	None	Tanu Muino	
"Sun Goes Down"	2021	None	Lil Nas X and Psycho Films	
"Industry Baby"	2021	Jack Harlow	Christian Breslauer	
"That's What I Want"	2021	None	Stillz	
"Late to da Party (F*ck BET)"	2022	YoungBoy Never Broke Again	Gibson Hazard	
"J Christ"	2024	None	Lil Nas X	
"Light Again!"	2024	None	Andrew Donoho	
"Hotbox"	2025	None	Elias Talbot	
As featured artist
"Light!"	2024	Skaiwater and 9lives	Erik Rojas	
"Tennessee"	2024	Kevin Abstract	Cole Bat	
"He Knows"	2024	Camila Cabello	Onda	
