= Dream Boy (disambiguation) =

Dream Boy is a 1995 novel by Jim Grimsley.

Dream Boy or Dreamboy may also refer to:

- Dream Boy (film), a 2008 American film based on Jim Grimsley's novel
- Dream Boy (musical), a Japanese musical production
- Dream Boy (character), a DC Comics superhero
- "Dream Boy" (song), by Beach Bunny
- "Dream Boy", a song released in 1961 by Annette Funicello
- "Dream Boy", a song released in 1964 by The Angels
- Dream Boys, a Rwandan R&B duo
- Dreamboy, a podcast
- Dreamboy (album), upcoming album by Lil Nas X
- "Dreamboy" (song), 2025 song by Lil Nas X
- Dreamboys, a revue band
