= Dreamboy (album) =

Upcoming studio album by Lil Nas X

Studio album by Lil Nas X
- Recorded: 2022–2025
- Label: Columbia
- Producers: Take a Daytrip; Ojivolta; Omer Fedi; Lil Nas X; Jasper Harris; Solomonophonic; Thomas Bangalter; Twisco; Jahnei Clarke; Roy Lenzo; Amanda Wong

Lil Nas X chronology
Days Before Dreamboy (2025)	Dreamboy (late 2026 or early 2027)

Singles from Dreamboy
- 1. "Light Again!" Released: November 15, 2024; 2. "Hotbox" Released: March 14, 2025

Dreamboy (stylized in all caps) is the upcoming second studio album by American rapper and singer Lil Nas X, set to be released through Columbia Records. The album was recorded from 2022 to 2025, and the production will be primarily handled by Lil Nas X's frequent collaborators, including Take a Daytrip, Omer Fedi, and Jasper Harris as well as Lil Nas X himself, Thomas Bangalter of Daft Punk, Ojivolta, Twisco, Solomonophonic, Jahnei Clarke, Roy Lenzo, and Amanda Wong, alongside many others. Before the album's release, an extended play (EP) was released, titled Days Before Dreamboy, on March 28, 2025.

The album was promoted by two singles and six promotional singles. The lead single, "Light Again!" was released on November 15, 2024, and was soon followed by "Need Dat Boy" as the first promotional single on November 22. The title track was released as the second promotional single on March 10, 2025, and was followed by "Big Dummy" on March 11, "Swish" on March 12, and "Right There!" on March 13. "Hotbox" was released as the second single on March 14, 2025, and "Lean on My Body" was soon released as the sixth promotional single on March 21. Songs named "Sadly I'm Still Human" and "Percocet Lovers" were also revealed as the first and ninth tracks for the album respectively.

== Background ==
Following the release of his debut album, Montero, in 2021, Nas X started his Long Live Montero Tour, which ran from September 6, 2022, to March 26, 2023. This tour acted as a goodbye to his previous Montero era and a welcome into his new "Dreamboy" era. The tour was followed by a documentary, Lil Nas X: Long Live Montero, which was promoted with the single "Where Do We Go Now?". In February 2025, he signed to management company Crush Management for his upcoming ventures. The single "J Christ" preceded the film on January 12, 2024, and the film was followed by "Here We Go!", which was released on June 27.

== Release and promotion ==
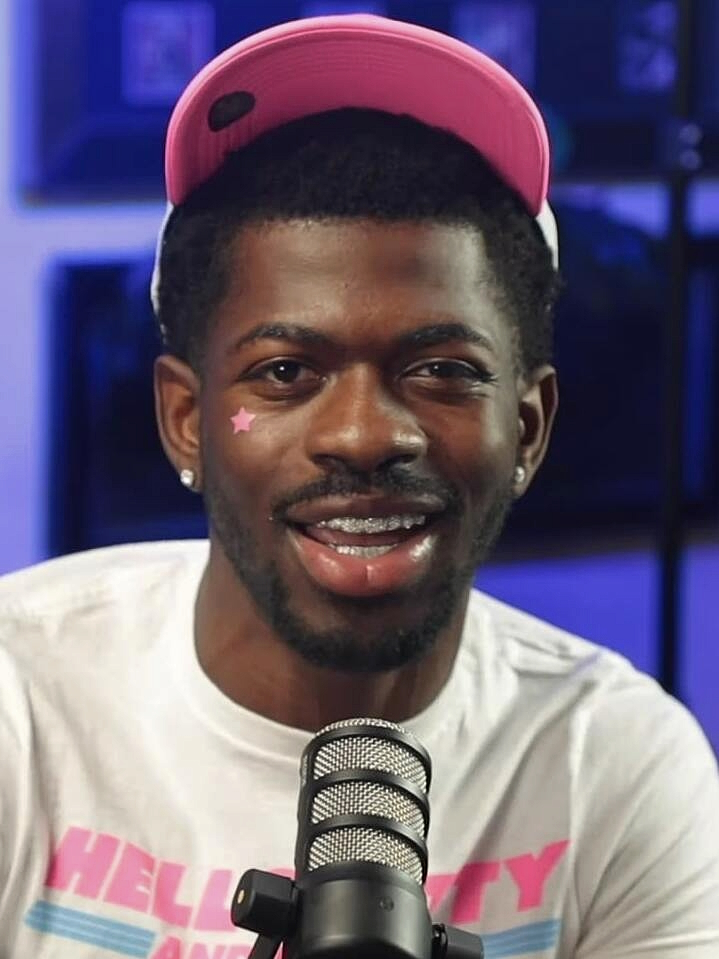
Lil Nas X (pictured) promoting the single "Hotbox" at Hot 107.9

Following the release of lead single "Light Again!", Lil Nas X announced the title for his second album Dreamboy on Twitter. On November 10, 2024, a promotional video for Dreamboy: Phase 1 featuring the beat of the single "Light Again!" was posted on his social media pages. On November 12, 2024, Lil Nas X uploaded a trailer for phase 1 titled "DREAMBOY." on his YouTube channel. where he was stranded out of sea before being met by his Dreamboy alter ego who opened a portal and rescued him. This trailer featured an upbeat sound that could possibly be the beat to one of the tracks on the album, which lead into a black screen teasing "Phase 1: Ep.1: Let There Be Light", before displaying a "To Be Continued" text followed by the Dreamboy logo.

The next day, Nas uploaded a continued version of this on his YouTube channel titled "You Are Everything!" Starting in the same way the previous trailer ended, Lil Nas X falls through the same portal before a somber piano ballad begins with him rising from the ground in a white suit, referencing his "Sun Goes Down" music video. This is then followed by a narrative by his Dreamboy alter ego walking over towards Nas in a suit, who is looking at his previous stories, worlds he has created and dreams. The beat for "Light Again!" then begins as a screen of Dreamboy emailing his contacts about a party at his house that night, teasing the "Light Again!" music video.

From March 10 to 13, 2025, a series of promotional singles were released for the album, alongside accompanying music videos, which were released on YouTube. The series was started with the title track, and was followed by "Big Dummy", "Swish", and "Right There!". On the 15th, the third single from the album, "Hotbox" was released alongside its music video. The song peaked at number 33 on the New Zealand Hot Singles chart, although it failed to make any other chart, including the Billboard Hot 100. The song was followed by the album's fourth single, "Lean on My Body", alongside the song's lyric video. Some tracks were teased through a secret Twitter account called "dreamboy2006". This included track 9, "Percocet Lovers", track 13, "Light Again!" and track 5, "Hotbox".

=== Days Before Dreamboy ===
An eight-track extended play (EP), titled Days Before Dreamboy, was released on March 28, 2025, consisting of songs that Lil Nas X released from November 2024 to March 2025, including the two singles and six promotional singles released for the album. It served as Nas X's first EP since his major-label debut, 7 (2019), and is his most recent release.

== Track listing ==
Dreamboy track listing
No.	Title	Lyrics	Music	Producer(s)	Length
1.	"Sadly I'm Still Human"	Montero Hill
5.	"Hotbox"	Hill	David Biral; Denzel Baptiste; Mark Williams; Raul Cubina; Omer Fedi	Take a Daytrip; Ojivolta; Fedi	3:02
9.	"Percocet Lovers"	Hill
13.	"Light Again!"	Hill	Biral; Baptiste; Hill; Thomas Bangalter; Fedi; Jasper Harris; Nija Charles; Jermaine Dupri; Brandon Casey; Brian Casey; Bryan-Michael Cox; Beyoncé Knowles; Denisia Andrews; Brittany Coney; Morten Ristorp; Raphael Saadiq; Terius Nash; Mary Brockert; Allen McGrier; Nile Rodgers	Take a Daytrip; Fedi; Bangalter; Hill	2:57

== Personnel ==
=== Musicians ===
- Montero Hill – lead vocals (all tracks), background vocals, production
- Take A Daytrip – production, writing (5, 13)
- Omer Fedi - production, writing (13)
- Thomas Bangalter - production, writing (13)
- Jasper Harris - production, writing (13)
- Nija - writing (13)
- Jermaine Dupri - writing (13)
- Brandon Casey - writing (13)
- Brian Casey - writing (13)
- Bryan Cox - writing (13)
- Beyoncé Knowles - writing (13)
- Denisia Andrews - writing (13)
- Brittany Coney - writing (13)
- Morten Ristorp - writing (13)
- Raphael Saadiq - writing (13)
- Terius Nash - writing (13)
- Mary Brockert - writing (13)
- Allen McGrier - writing (13)
- Nile Rodgers - writing (13)
- Randy Merrill - mastering engineer (13)
- Bryce Bordone - assistant engineer (13)
- Șerban Ghenea - mixing engineer (13)
