= Dream Baby =

Dream Baby may refer to:

- "Dream Baby (How Long Must I Dream)", a 1962 song by Roy Orbison
  - covered by Glen Campbell, 1971
  - covered by Lacy J. Dalton, 1983
- "Dream Baby", a song by Cher from the album All I Really Want to Do, 1965
- Dream Baby, a 1989 novel by Bruce McAllister

== See also ==
- Dream Boy (disambiguation)
- Dream Girl (disambiguation)
