= Pink Versace suit and harness of Lil Nas X =

Fashion garnent

- Designer: Versace
- Year: 2020
- Type: Haute couture suit and harness
- Material: Leather

American rapper Lil Nas X wore a couture fuchsia Versace suit with a pink harness to the 62nd Annual Grammy Awards on January 26, 2020, during which he accepted his awards for Best Music Video and Best Pop Duo/Group Performance for "Old Town Road (Remix)." In 2022, Billboard suggested that Lil Nas X was one of the earliest celebrity adopters of the monochromatic pink Barbiecore trend. Some critics have suggested that this outfit was the beginning of Lil Nas X's style pivot to an embrace of queer fashion.

== Background and design ==
Throughout 2019 and early 2020, Lil Nas X embraced a country-western aesthetic for his red carpet appearances and live shows. Prior to the 62nd Annual Grammy Awards, Lil Nas X's stylist, Hodo Musa, told the Los Angeles Times that this would be his final outfit that would reference this aesthetic. She selected Versace because she found their work with hip-hop artists in the 1990s to be inspiring. Lil Nas X told CR Men that the outfit was "trying to deviate from the norm that most guys wear—suit, tie." He liked that the outfit could be "a talking point" and saw it as an opportunity to "get more in tune with [his] flamboyant side."

The outfit consisted of a matching bright pink and gold-studded cropped leather jacket and high-waisted trousers. The top underneath his jacket was black mesh and he also wore a bondage harness which stylist Shannon Stokes noted was likely an allusion to the 1992 Versace dominatrix collection and which GQ compared to Donatella Versace's bondage dress. He also wore a pink studded cowboy hat and boots, as well as silk scarves on his wrists. His clothes were patterned with the Versace Medusa icon, and his jewelry was a mixture of Versace and John Hardy. Overall, the outfit took over 700 hours to complete.

== Reception ==
The outfit was generally well received by critics. The Los Angeles Times said that Lil Nas X "electrified the celebrity walk." Paper Magazine called the look "undeniably fresh, totally him, and the kind of garment [they] want to stay talking about." Reception from outside the critical community also trended positive, with detractors primarily expressing homophobic sentiments as the reason they disliked the outfit. Bondage gear would become a menswear trend in high fashion in Autumn/Winter 2020.

Lil Nas X's pink Versace suit has been ranked among his best outfits by numerous publications.

== See also ==
- Queer fashion
- Satan Shoes
