= List of awards and nominations received by Lil Nas X =

Lil Nas X awards and nominations
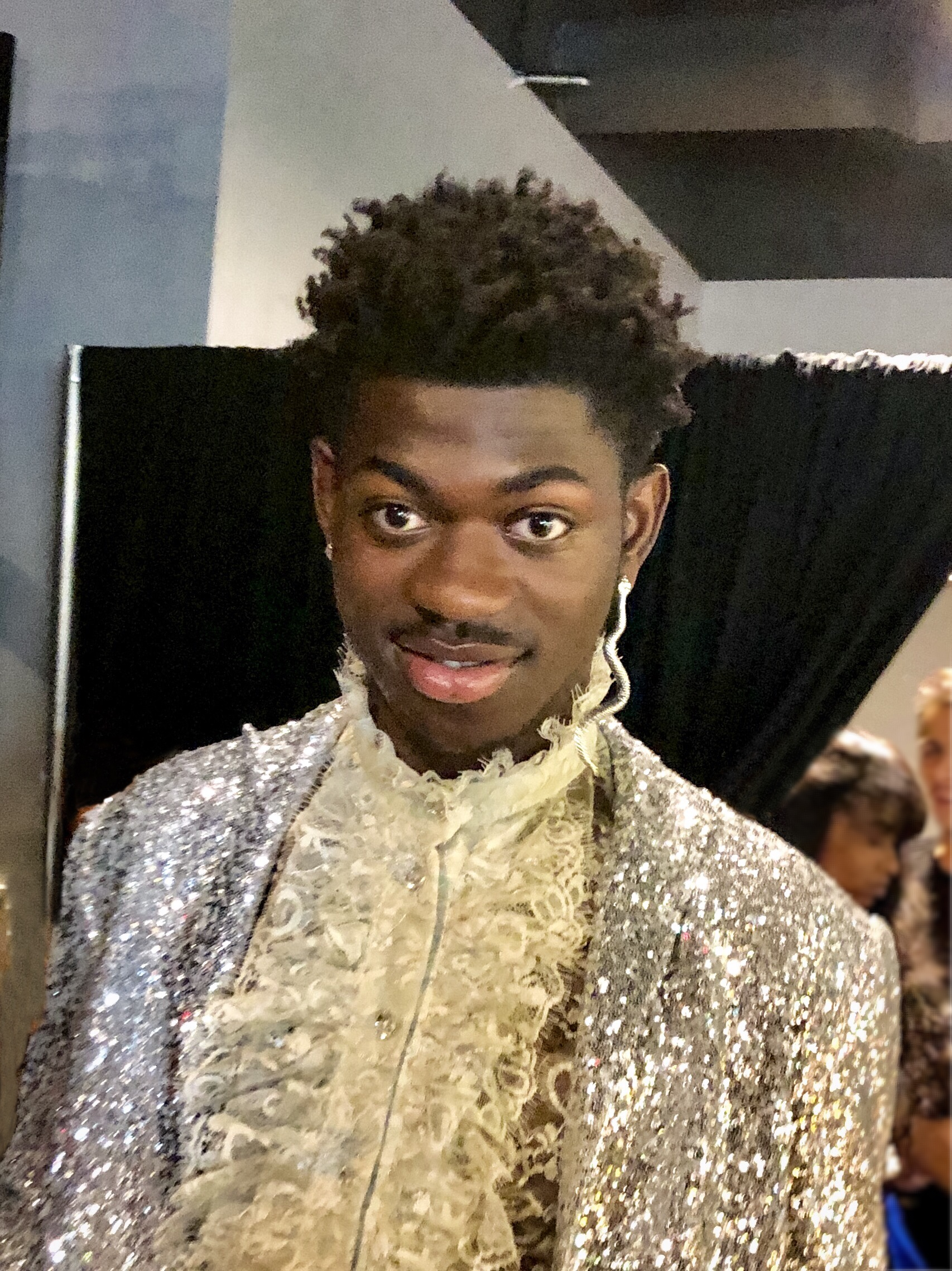
- Lil Nas X in 2019
Awards and nominations
Award	Wins	Nominations
American Music Awards	2	10
Apple Music Awards	1	1
BBC Radio 1's Teen Awards	0	1
BET Hip Hop Awards	2	5
Billboard Music Awards	5	18
BMI Pop Awards	2	2
Bravo Otto	0	1
Brit Awards	0	2
Cannes Lions International Festival of Creativity	1	2
Ciclope Festival Awards	0	1
Country Music Association Awards	1	1
Gaygalan Awards	0	1
GLAAD Media Awards	2	2
Global Awards	1	1
Grammy Awards	2	11
iHeartRadio Music Awards	2	13
iHeartRadio Titanium Awards	1	1
LOS40 Music Awards	0	3
MTV Europe Music Awards	1	12
MTV Millennial Awards	0	1
MTV Millennial Awards Brazil	0	1
MTV Video Music Awards	8	22
MTV Video Play Awards	1	1
Nickelodeon Kids' Choice Awards	1	4
NRJ Awards	0	6
People's Choice Awards	1	9
Premios Odeón	1	1
Queerty Awards	1	1
Rockbjörnen	0	1
Shots Awards	1	1
Songwriters Hall of Fame	1	1
Streamy Awards	1	2
Swiss Music Awards	0	1
Teen Choice Awards	1	5
UK Music Video Awards	1	4
Wowie Awards	1	1

Totals (Note: Certain award groups do not simply award one winner. They acknowledge several different recipients, have runners-up, and have third place. Since this is a specific recognition and is different from losing an award, runner-up mentions are considered wins in this award tally. For simplification and to avoid errors, each award in this list has been presumed to have had a prior nomination.)
- Wins: 43
- Nominations: 152

American rapper and singer Lil Nas X is the recipient of multiple awards including two Grammy Awards, five Billboard Music Awards, five MTV Video Music Awards, two BET Hip Hop Awards, two iHeartRadio Music Awards and two American Music Awards. He has also been awarded by Songwriters Hall of Fame as the youngest honoree of Hal David Starlight Award.

Lil Nas X and Billy Ray Cyrus' remix also won the Country Music Association (CMA) Awards collaboration category, CMA Music Event of the Year; Lil Nas X is the first out gay man to ever be nominated for a CMA award, and the only openly LGBTQ person to win. Vox noted the Event Award is not a part of the CMA televised celebration, and they snubbed Lil Nas X from bigger appropriate categories.

The "Old Town Road" remix with Cyrus has been nominated for a People's Choice Award for Song of 2019, Lil Nas X was also nominated for "Male Artist of 2019" at the 45th People's Choice Awards. In October, at the 2019 BET Hip Hop Awards Lil Nas X, with Cyrus, won for Best Collab/Duo or Group, and Single of the Year. (Note: Lil Nas X was also nominated for 'Best New Hip-Hop Artist'.)

== Awards and nominations ==
Name of the award ceremony, year presented, award category, nominee(s) of the award and the result of the nomination
Award	Year (Note: Indicates the year of ceremony. Each year is linked to the article about the awards held that year, wherever possible.)	Category	Recipient(s)	Result	Ref.
American Music Awards	2019	New Artist of the Year	—N/a	Nominated	
American Music Awards	2019	Collaboration of the Year	"Old Town Road (Remix)" (featuring Billy Ray Cyrus)	Nominated	
American Music Awards	2019	Favorite Song — Rap/Hip-Hop	"Old Town Road (Remix)" (featuring Billy Ray Cyrus)	Won	
American Music Awards	2019	Favorite Music Video	"Old Town Road (Remix)" (featuring Billy Ray Cyrus)	Nominated	
American Music Awards	2019	Favorite Song — Pop/Rock	"Old Town Road (Remix)" (featuring Billy Ray Cyrus)	Nominated	
American Music Awards	2021	Favorite Music Video	"Montero (Call Me by Your Name)"	Won	
American Music Awards	2021	Favorite Male Pop Artist	—N/a	Nominated	
American Music Awards	2022	Collaboration of the Year	"Industry Baby" (with Jack Harlow)	Nominated	
American Music Awards	2022	Favorite Song — Rap/Hip-Hop	"Industry Baby" (with Jack Harlow)	Nominated	
American Music Awards	2022	Favorite Music Video	"Industry Baby" (with Jack Harlow)	Nominated	
Apple Music Awards	2019	Song of the Year	"Old Town Road"	Won	
APRA Awards	2023	Most Performed International Work	"That's What I Want"	Nominated	
BBC Radio 1's Teen Awards	2019	Best Single	"Old Town Road"	Nominated	
Berlin Music Video Awards	2020	Best Concept	"Old Town Road"	Nominated	
Berlin Music Video Awards	2022	Best Director	"Industry Baby"	Nominated	
Berlin Music Video Awards	2024	Best Director	"J Christ"	Nominated	
BET Awards	2020	Best New Artist	—N/a	Nominated	
BET Hip Hop Awards	2019	Best New Hip Hop Artist	—N/a	Nominated	
BET Hip Hop Awards	2019	Single of the Year	"Old Town Road (Remix)" (featuring Billy Ray Cyrus)	Won	
BET Hip Hop Awards	2019	Best Collab, Duo or Group	"Old Town Road (Remix)" (featuring Billy Ray Cyrus)	Won	
BET Hip Hop Awards	2021	Best Hip Hop Video	"Montero (Call Me by Your Name)"	Nominated	
BET Hip Hop Awards	2021	Impact Track	"Montero (Call Me by Your Name)"	Nominated	
Billboard Music Awards	2020	Top New Artist	—N/a	Nominated	
Billboard Music Awards	2020	Billboard Chart Achievement (fan-voted)	—N/a	Nominated	
Billboard Music Awards	2020	Top Male Artist	—N/a	Nominated	
Billboard Music Awards	2020	Top Hot 100 Artist	—N/a	Nominated	
Billboard Music Awards	2020	Top Streaming Songs Artist	—N/a	Nominated	
Billboard Music Awards	2020	Top Song Sales Artist	—N/a	Nominated	
Billboard Music Awards	2020	Top Rap Artist	—N/a	Nominated	
Billboard Music Awards	2020	Top Rap Male Artist	—N/a	Nominated	
Billboard Music Awards	2020	Top Hot 100 Song	"Old Town Road (Remix)" (featuring Billy Ray Cyrus)	Won	
Billboard Music Awards	2020	Top Streaming Song	"Old Town Road (Remix)" (featuring Billy Ray Cyrus)	Won	
Billboard Music Awards	2020	Top Selling Song	"Old Town Road (Remix)" (featuring Billy Ray Cyrus)	Won	
Billboard Music Awards	2020	Top Collaboration (fan-voted)	"Old Town Road (Remix)" (featuring Billy Ray Cyrus)	Nominated	
Billboard Music Awards	2020	Top Rap Song	"Old Town Road (Remix)" (featuring Billy Ray Cyrus)	Won	
Billboard Music Awards	2022	Top Male Artist	—N/a	Nominated	
Billboard Music Awards	2022	Top Streaming Songs Artist	—N/a	Nominated	
Billboard Music Awards	2022	Top Collaboration	"Industry Baby" (with Jack Harlow)	Nominated	
Billboard Music Awards	2022	Top Rap Song	"Industry Baby" (with Jack Harlow)	Won	
Billboard Music Awards	2022	Top Billboard Global 200 (Excl. U.S.) Song	"Montero (Call Me by Your Name)"	Nominated	
BMI Pop Awards	2022	Songwriters of Most Performed Song of the Year	"Montero (Call Me by Your Name)"	Won	
BMI Pop Awards	2022	Songwriters of Most Performed Song of the Year	"Industry Baby"	Won	
Bravo Otto	2019	Newcomer	—N/a	Nominated	
Brit Awards	2022	International Artist of the Year	—N/a	Nominated	
Brit Awards	2022	Best International Song	"Montero (Call Me by Your Name)"	Nominated	
Cannes Lions International Festival of Creativity	2022	Entertainment Lions for Music	"Industry Baby" (with Jack Harlow)	Silver	
Cannes Lions International Festival of Creativity	2022	Entertainment Lions for Music	Lil Nas X “Montero”	Shortlisted	
Ciclope Festival Awards	2021	Visual Effects in a Music Video	"Call Me by Your Name"	Nominated	
Country Music Association Awards	2019	Musical Event of the Year	"Old Town Road (Remix)" (featuring Billy Ray Cyrus)	Won	
Danish Music Awards	2019	Foreign Song of the Year	"Old Town Road (Remix)" (featuring Billy Ray Cyrus)	Nominated	
Gaygalan Awards	2022	International Song of the Year	"Call Me by Your Name"	Nominated	
GLAAD Media Awards	2020	Outstanding Music Artist	7	Won	
GLAAD Media Awards	2022	Outstanding Music Artist	Montero	Won	
Global Awards	2022	Special Award for Creativity	—N/a	Won	
Grammy Awards	2020	Record of the Year	"Old Town Road (Remix)" (featuring Billy Ray Cyrus)	Nominated	
Grammy Awards	2020	Best Pop Duo/Group Performance	"Old Town Road (Remix)" (featuring Billy Ray Cyrus)	Won	
Grammy Awards	2020	Best Music Video	"Old Town Road (Remix)" (featuring Billy Ray Cyrus)	Won	
Grammy Awards	2020	Album of the Year	7	Nominated	
Grammy Awards	2020	Best New Artist	—N/a	Nominated	
Grammy Awards	2020	Best Rap/Sung Performance	"Panini"	Nominated	
Grammy Awards	2022	Record of the Year	"Montero (Call Me by Your Name)"	Nominated	
Grammy Awards	2022	Song of the Year	"Montero (Call Me by Your Name)"	Nominated	
Grammy Awards	2022	Best Music Video	"Montero (Call Me by Your Name)"	Nominated	
Grammy Awards	2022	Album of the Year	Montero	Nominated	
Grammy Awards	2022	Best Melodic Rap Performance	"Industry Baby" (with Jack Harlow)	Nominated	
iHeartRadio Music Awards	2020	Song of the Year	"Old Town Road"	Nominated	
iHeartRadio Music Awards	2020	Hip-Hop Song of the Year	"Old Town Road"	Nominated	
iHeartRadio Music Awards	2020	Best Music Video	"Old Town Road (Remix)" (featuring Billy Ray Cyrus)	Nominated	
iHeartRadio Music Awards	2020	Best Remix	"Old Town Road (Remix)" (featuring Billy Ray Cyrus)	Nominated	
iHeartRadio Music Awards	2020	Best New Pop Artist	—N/a	Nominated	
iHeartRadio Music Awards	2020	Best New Hip-Hop Artist	—N/a	Nominated	
iHeartRadio Music Awards	2022	Male Artist of the Year	—N/a	Won	
iHeartRadio Music Awards	2022	iHeartRadio Hat Trick	—N/a	Won	
iHeartRadio Music Awards	2022	Best Lyrics	"Montero (Call Me by Your Name)"	Nominated	
iHeartRadio Music Awards	2022	Song of the Year	"Montero (Call Me by Your Name)"	Nominated	
iHeartRadio Music Awards	2022	Best Music Video	"Montero (Call Me by Your Name)"	Nominated	
iHeartRadio Music Awards	2022	TikTok Bop of the Year	"Montero (Call Me by Your Name)"	Nominated	
iHeartRadio Music Awards	2022	Best Cover Song	"Jolene" (Dolly Parton)	Nominated	
iHeartRadio Music Awards	2023	Song of the Year	"Industry Baby" (with Jack Harlow)	Nominated	
iHeartRadio Music Awards	2023	Best Collaboration	"Industry Baby" (with Jack Harlow)	Nominated	
iHeartRadio Music Awards	2023	Favorite Tour Style	—N/a	Nominated	
iHeartRadio Titanium Awards	2022	Winning Song	"Montero (Call Me by Your Name)"	Won	
iHeartRadio Titanium Awards	2022	Winning Song	"Thats What I Want"	Won	
iHeartRadio Titanium Awards	2022	Winning Song	"Industry Baby"	Won	
LOS40 Music Awards	2019	Best International New Artist	—N/a	Nominated	
LOS40 Music Awards	2021	Best International Song	"Montero (Call Me by Your Name)"	Nominated	
LOS40 Music Awards	2021	Best International Video	"Montero (Call Me by Your Name)"	Nominated	
MTV Europe Music Awards	2019	Best New Act	—N/a	Nominated	
MTV Europe Music Awards	2019	Best Look	—N/a	Nominated	
MTV Europe Music Awards	2019	Best US Act	—N/a	Nominated	
MTV Europe Music Awards	2019	Best Song	"Old Town Road (Remix)" (featuring Billy Ray Cyrus)	Nominated	
MTV Europe Music Awards	2019	Best Video	"Old Town Road (Remix)" (featuring Billy Ray Cyrus)	Nominated	
MTV Europe Music Awards	2019	Best Collaboration	"Old Town Road (Remix)" (featuring Billy Ray Cyrus)	Nominated	
MTV Europe Music Awards	2021	Best US Act	—N/a	Nominated	
MTV Europe Music Awards	2021	Best Artist	—N/a	Nominated	
MTV Europe Music Awards	2021	Best Song	"Montero (Call Me by Your Name)"	Nominated	
MTV Europe Music Awards	2021	Best Video	"Montero (Call Me by Your Name)"	Won	
MTV Europe Music Awards	2021	Video For Good	"Montero (Call Me by Your Name)"	Nominated	
MTV Europe Music Awards	2021	Best Collaboration	"Industry Baby" (with Jack Harlow)	Nominated	
MTV Millennial Awards	2021	Global Hit of the Year	"Montero (Call Me By Your Name)"	Nominated	
MTV Millennial Awards Brazil	2021	Global Hit	"Montero (Call Me By Your Name)"	Nominated	
MTV Video Music Awards	2019	Best New Artist	—N/a	Nominated	
MTV Video Music Awards	2019	Video of the Year	"Old Town Road (Remix)" (featuring Billy Ray Cyrus)	Nominated	
MTV Video Music Awards	2019	Song of the Year	"Old Town Road (Remix)" (featuring Billy Ray Cyrus)	Won	
MTV Video Music Awards	2019	Best Collaboration	"Old Town Road (Remix)" (featuring Billy Ray Cyrus)	Nominated	
MTV Video Music Awards	2019	Best Hip-Hop Video	"Old Town Road (Remix)" (featuring Billy Ray Cyrus)	Nominated	
MTV Video Music Awards	2019	Song of Summer	"Old Town Road (Remix)" (featuring Billy Ray Cyrus)	Nominated	
MTV Video Music Awards	2019	Best Direction	"Old Town Road (Remix)" (featuring Billy Ray Cyrus)	Won	
MTV Video Music Awards	2019	Best Editing	"Old Town Road (Remix)" (featuring Billy Ray Cyrus)	Nominated	
MTV Video Music Awards	2019	Best Art Direction	"Old Town Road (Remix)" (featuring Billy Ray Cyrus)	Nominated	
MTV Video Music Awards	2021	Video of the Year	"Montero (Call Me By Your Name)"	Won	
MTV Video Music Awards	2021	Video for Good	"Montero (Call Me By Your Name)"	Nominated	
MTV Video Music Awards	2021	Best Direction	"Montero (Call Me By Your Name)"	Won	
MTV Video Music Awards	2021	Best Art Direction	"Montero (Call Me By Your Name)"	Nominated	
MTV Video Music Awards	2021	Best Visual Effects	"Montero (Call Me By Your Name)"	Won	
MTV Video Music Awards	2021	Song of Summer	"Industry Baby" (with Jack Harlow)	Nominated	
MTV Video Music Awards	2022	Video of the Year	"Industry Baby" (with Jack Harlow)	Nominated	
MTV Video Music Awards	2022	Best Collaboration	"Industry Baby" (with Jack Harlow)	Won	
MTV Video Music Awards	2022	Best Direction	"Industry Baby" (with Jack Harlow)	Nominated	
MTV Video Music Awards	2022	Best Art Direction	"Industry Baby" (with Jack Harlow)	Won	
MTV Video Music Awards	2022	Best Visual Effect	"Industry Baby" (with Jack Harlow)	Won	
MTV Video Music Awards	2022	Best Choreography	"Industry Baby" (with Jack Harlow)	Nominated	
MTV Video Music Awards	2022	Artist of the Year	—N/a	Nominated	
MTV Video Play Awards	2019	Winning Video	"Old Town Road (Remix)" (featuring Billy Ray Cyrus)	Won	
Nickelodeon Kids' Choice Awards	2020	Favorite Song	"Old Town Road"	Nominated	
Nickelodeon Kids' Choice Awards	2020	Favorite Music Collaboration	"Old Town Road"	Nominated	
Nickelodeon Kids' Choice Awards	2020	Favorite Male Artist	—N/a	Nominated	
Nickelodeon Kids' Choice Awards	2020	Favorite Breakout New Artist	—N/a	Won	
NRJ Music Awards	2019	International Breakthrough of the Year	—N/a	Nominated	
NRJ Music Awards	2019	International Duo/Group of the Year	Lil Nas X and Billy Ray Cyrus	Nominated	
NRJ Music Awards	2019	International Song of the Year	"Old Town Road (Remix)" (featuring Billy Ray Cyrus)	Nominated	
NRJ Music Awards	2019	Video of the Year	"Old Town Road (Remix)" (featuring Billy Ray Cyrus)	Nominated	
People's Choice Awards	2019	Male Artist of 2019	—N/a	Nominated	
People's Choice Awards	2019	Song of 2019	"Old Town Road (Remix)" (featuring Billy Ray Cyrus)	Nominated	
People's Choice Awards	2020	The Style Star of 2020	—N/a	Nominated	
People's Choice Awards	2021	The Male Artist of 2021	—N/a	Won	
People's Choice Awards	2021	The Social Star of 2021	—N/a	Nominated	
People's Choice Awards	2021	The Album of 2021	Montero	Nominated	
People's Choice Awards	2021	The Song of 2021	"Montero (Call Me By Your Name)"	Nominated	
People's Choice Awards	2021	The Music Video of 2021	"Montero (Call Me By Your Name)"	Nominated	
People's Choice Awards	2021	The Collaboration Song of 2021	"Industry Baby" (with Jack Harlow)	Nominated	
People's Choice Awards	2022	The Social Celebrity of 2022	—N/a	Nominated	
Premios Odeón	2022	Best International Song	"Montero (Call Me By Your Name)"	Won	
Queerty Awards	2020	Closet Door Bustdown	—N/a	Won	
Rockbjörnen	2021	Foreign Song of the Year	"Montero (Call Me By Your Name)"	Nominated	
Shots Awards	2022	Music Video of the Year (silver)	"Industry Baby" (with Jack Harlow)	Won	
Songwriters Hall of Fame	2022	Hal David Starlight Award	—N/a	Won	
Streamy Awards	2019	Breakthrough Artist	—N/a	Won	
Streamy Awards	2021	Best Collaboration	"Lil Nas X “Montero (Call Me By Your Name)” REACTION WITH LIL NAS X!!" (with Zach Campbell)	Nominated	
Swiss Music Awards	2020	Best International Hit	"Old Town Road"	Nominated	
Teen Choice Awards	2019	Choice Male Artist	—N/a	Nominated	
Teen Choice Awards	2019	Choice Breakout Artist	—N/a	Nominated	
Teen Choice Awards	2019	Choice Song: Male Artist	"Old Town Road"	Nominated	
Teen Choice Awards	2019	Choice Collaboration	"Old Town Road (Remix)" (featuring Billy Ray Cyrus)	Nominated	
Teen Choice Awards	2019	Choice Song: R&B/Hip-Hop	"Old Town Road (Remix)" (featuring Billy Ray Cyrus)	Won	
UK Music Video Awards	2019	Best Urban Video – International	"Old Town Road (Remix)" (featuring Billy Ray Cyrus)	Nominated	
UK Music Video Awards	2021	Best Pop Video – International	"Montero (Call Me By Your Name)"	Nominated	
UK Music Video Awards	2021	Best Pop Video – International	"Industry Baby" (with Jack Harlow)	Won	
UK Music Video Awards	2021	Best Choreography in a Video	"Industry Baby" (with Jack Harlow)	Nominated	
Wowie Awards	2022	Breakout Star of the Year	—N/a	Won	
