= Long Live Montero Tour =

2022–23 concert tour by Lil Nas X

- World tour by Lil Nas X
- Location: North America • Europe • South America • Oceania
- Associated album: Montero
- Start date: September 6, 2022
- End date: March 26, 2023
- Legs: 3
- No. of shows: 21 in North America; 7 in Europe; 1 in Oceania; 29 total
- Supporting acts: Owenn; Skaiwater; Gold Fang
- Website: longlivemontero.com

The Long Live Montero Tour was the debut concert tour by American rapper Lil Nas X, in support of his debut studio album, Montero (2021). The tour spanned across North America and Europe, beginning on September 6, 2022, in Detroit, Michigan, and concluded in Barcelona on November 17, 2022. In September 2022, it was announced that artist will play an exclusive show located at the Hordern Pavilion in Sydney, on January 4, 2023.

== Background ==
On April 26, 2022, Lil Nas X announced a concert tour to support the debut album, Montero. The tour, titled Long Live Montero Tour, will be his first headlining concert tour, and set to begin on September 6, 2022 in Detroit, and conclude on November 17, 2022 in Barcelona. Tickets for North American dates went on sale on April 29, with European dates to follow on May 6. Mobile payment service, Cash App, held pre-sales for North American dates on April 27 via Ticketmaster. In early September 2022, the artist announced that he'll play an exclusive show in Sydney. The show happened at the Hordern Pavilion on January 4, 2023.

On August 18, 2023, Lil Nas X announced Lil Nas X: Long Live Montero, a documentary film that chronicles life on the road during the Long Live Montero Tour as he discusses his career and his place in the pop world as a Black and queer performer. The film premiered at the 2023 Toronto International Film Festival on September 9, 2023, and was released on Max on January 27, 2024.

== Set list ==
The set list was revealed after Lil Nas X performed his first show on September 6, 2022, at the Fox Theatre.

1. "Panini"
2. "Tales of Dominica"
3. "Sun Goes Down"
4. "Old Town Road" / "Rodeo"
5. "Dead Right Now"
6. "Dont Want It"
7. "Thats What I Want"
8. "Lost in the Citadel"
9. "Montero (Call Me by Your Name)"
10. "Down Souf Hoes"
11. "Scoop"
12. "Industry Baby"

Encore

13. "Star Walkin'"

=== Notes ===
- "Dont Want It" was followed by a voguing section with the use of "Pure/Honey" by Beyoncé, which transitioned into "Thats What I Want".

== Shows ==
List of concerts, showing date, city, country, venue, and opening act
Date	City	Country	Venue	Opening act
Leg 1 — North America
September 6, 2022 (Note: The shows on September 6–7, 2022 in Detroit were originally scheduled to take place at The Fillmore Detroit.)	Detroit	United States	Fox Theatre	—
September 7, 2022	Detroit	United States	Fox Theatre	—
September 10, 2022	Chicago	United States	Byline Bank Aragon Ballroom	—
September 11, 2022	Chicago	United States	Byline Bank Aragon Ballroom	—
September 16, 2022 (Note: The show on September 16, 2022 in Toronto was originally scheduled to take place on September 15–16, 2022 at History.)	Toronto	Canada	RBC Echo Beach	—
September 18, 2022	Boston	United States	MGM Music Hall at Fenway	—
September 20, 2022	New York City	United States	Radio City Music Hall	Owenn
September 21, 2022	New York City	United States	Radio City Music Hall	Owenn
September 22, 2022	Philadelphia	United States	The Met Philadelphia	—
September 25, 2022	Washington, D.C.	United States	The Anthem	—
September 27, 2022	Atlanta	United States	Coca-Cola Roxy	—
September 28, 2022	Atlanta	United States	Coca-Cola Roxy	—
October 2, 2022	Nashville	United States	Nashville Municipal Auditorium	—
October 4, 2022	Miami	United States	James L. Knight Center	—
October 5, 2022 (Note: The show on October 5, 2022 in Orlando was originally scheduled to take place on October 3, 2022, but was rescheduled due to Hurricane Ian.)	Orlando	United States	Hard Rock Live	—
October 11, 2022	Houston	United States	713 Music Hall	—
October 12, 2022	Irving	United States	The Pavilion at Toyota Music Factory	—
October 18, 2022	Inglewood	United States	YouTube Theater	—
October 19, 2022	Inglewood	United States	YouTube Theater	—
October 21, 2022	Phoenix	United States	Arizona Financial Theatre	—
October 23, 2022	San Francisco	United States	Bill Graham Civic Auditorium	—
Leg 2 — Europe
November 8, 2022	Amsterdam	Netherlands	AFAS Live	Skaiwater
November 9, 2022	Berlin	Germany	Max-Schmeling-Halle	Skaiwater
November 10, 2022	Hamburg	Germany	Alsterdorfer Sporthalle	Skaiwater
November 12, 2022	London	England	Eventim Apollo	Skaiwater
November 14, 2022	Paris	France	Zénith Paris	Skaiwater
November 15, 2022	Brussels	Belgium	Palais 12	Skaiwater
November 17, 2022	Barcelona	Spain	Sant Jordi Club	Skaiwater
Leg 3 — Oceania
January 4, 2023	Sydney	Australia	Hordern Pavilion	Gold Fang
