= Lil Nas X =

American rapper and singer (born 1999)

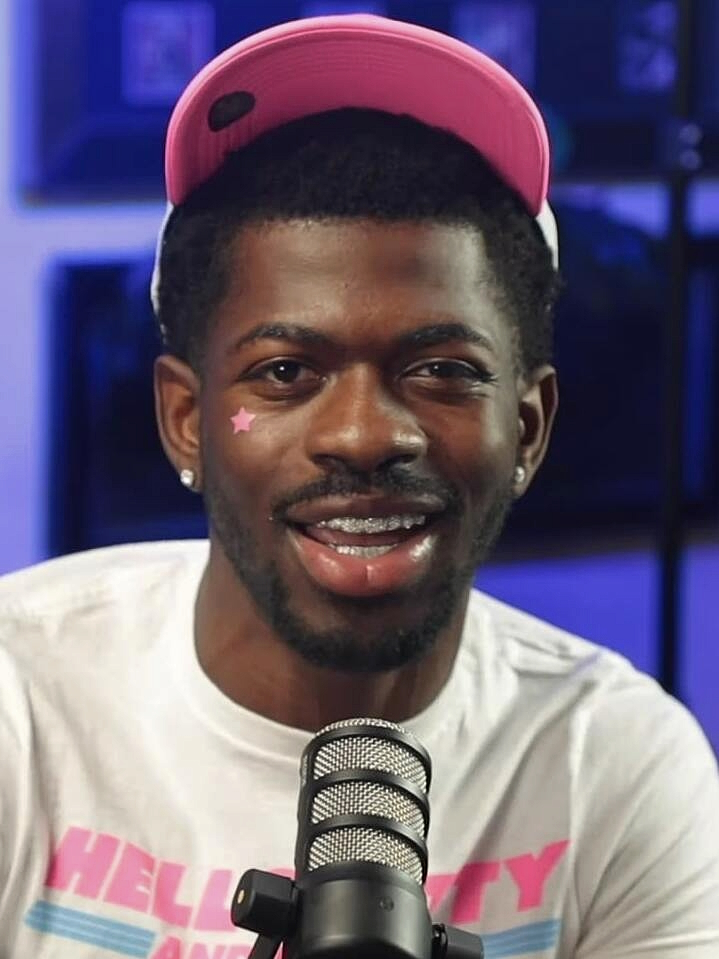
- Lil Nas X in 2025
- Born: Montero Lamar Hill; April 9, 1999 (age 27); Atlanta, Georgia, U.S.
- Education: University of West Georgia (no degree)
- Occupations: Rapper; singer; songwriter
- Years active: 2015–present
- Awards: Full list
- Musical career
- Origin: Austell, Georgia, U.S.
- Genres: Hip-hop; pop
- Works: Discography
- Label: Columbia
- Website: lilnasx.com

Montero Lamar Hill (born April 9, 1999), better known by his stage name Lil Nas X (/nɑːz/ NAHZ), is an American rapper, singer, and songwriter. He rose to prominence with the release of his 2018 country rap single "Old Town Road", which spent a then-record 19 weeks atop the U.S. Billboard Hot 100 chart. (Note: "Old Town Road" currently has the record for most (19) consecutive weeks at number one on the Hot 100. Due to the Christmas season, Mariah Carey's "All I Want for Christmas Is You" has spent 22 non-consecutive weeks atop the chart.) Simultaneously, he came out as gay, the first artist to do so while having a number-one record.

Following the success of "Old Town Road", Lil Nas X signed with Columbia Records to release his debut extended play (EP) 7 (2019), which spawned two follow-up singles: "Panini" and "Rodeo" (remixed featuring Nas); the former peaked at number five on the Billboard Hot 100, while the latter peaked at number 22. His debut studio album, Montero (2021), peaked at number two on the Billboard 200 and earned a nomination for Album of the Year at the 64th Annual Grammy Awards. It was supported by the Billboard Hot 100-number one singles "Montero (Call Me by Your Name)" and "Industry Baby" (featuring Jack Harlow), along with the top-ten single "Thats What I Want".

Known for his queer visuals and social media presence, Lil Nas X has received numerous accolades, including two Grammy Awards, five Billboard Music Awards, five MTV Video Music Awards, two BET Hip Hop Awards, two iHeartRadio Music Awards and two American Music Awards. "Old Town Road" ranks as the second highest-certified song in the United States—with 17 platinum certifications. He was placed on Forbes' 30 Under 30 in 2020, and Time named him one of the 100 most influential people in the world the following year. He became the youngest honoree in the Songwriters Hall of Fame in 2022 upon receiving the Hal David Starlight Award in May of that year.

== Early life and education ==
Montero Lamar Hill was born in Atlanta, Georgia, on April 9, 1999. He was named after the Mitsubishi Montero. His parents divorced when he was six, and he settled in the Bankhead Courts housing project in the Bankhead neighborhood of Atlanta with his mother, Tamikia Hill, and grandmother. Three years later, he moved in with his father, a gospel singer, north of the city in Austell. Although initially reluctant to leave, he later regarded it as an important decision: "There's so much shit going on in Atlanta—if I would have stayed there, I would have fallen in with the wrong crowd." He started "using the Internet heavily right around the time when memes started to become their own form of entertainment", about when he was 13.

He spent much of his teenage years alone, and turned to creating memes on the internet. His teenage years also saw him struggling with his coming out to himself as being gay; he prayed that it was just a phase, but around 16 or 17 he came to accept it. He began playing trumpet in the fourth grade and was first chair by his junior high years, but quit out of fear of looking uncool.

Hill attended Lithia Springs High School, from which he graduated in 2017. He then enrolled at the University of West Georgia, where he majored in computer science, but later dropped out after one year to pursue a music career. During this time, he stayed with his sister and supported himself with jobs at Zaxby's restaurants and the Six Flags Over Georgia theme park. In September 2019, he revisited his high school to perform a surprise concert.

== Career ==
=== 2015–2017: Internet personality and Nasarati ===
Hill said he began to isolate himself from "outside-of-class activities" during his teenage years. He spent large amounts of time online in hopes of building a following as an internet personality to promote his work, but he was unsure what to focus on creatively. In a Rolling Stone interview he stated, "I was doing Facebook comedy videos, then I moved over to Instagram, and then I hopped on Twitter ... where I really was a master. That was the first place where I could go viral." He also posted short-format comedy videos on Facebook and Vine.

During this period, he reportedly created and ran Nicki Minaj fan accounts on Twitter, including one called "@NasMaraj", according to a New York Magazine investigation. In 2017, this account gained attention for its flash fiction–style interactive "scenario threads" popularized on Twitter using dashboard app TweetDeck. The investigation linked @NasMaraj to the practice of "Tweetdecking", or using multiple accounts in collaboration to artificially make certain tweets go viral. The @NasMaraj account was suspended by Twitter due to "violating spam policies". After the suspension of @NasMaraj, New York Magazine's investigation concluded that he subsequently opened a new account with handle "@NasMarai", and that his current Twitter account at the time was a repurposed version of that "@NasMarai" account with a changed handle. After media reports linked Lil Nas X to the Minaj fan accounts, he called the reports a "misunderstanding", effectively denying having run the accounts. However, in May 2020, Lil Nas X admitted, in a tweet, to being a fan of Minaj. He explained why he initially denied it, stating that if people knew he was a fan of hers, they would think he was gay: "People will assume if you had an entire fan page dedicated to nicki u are gay. and the rap/music industry ain't exactly built or accepting of gay men yet". On June 17, 2020, Minaj responded to Nas, tweeting "It was a bit of a sting when you denied being a barb, but I understand. Congratulations on building up your confidence to speak your truth". Lil Nas apologized to Minaj, saying he "felt so bad, hoping u wouldn't see my denial". The @NasMarai account was later mentioned in a New York Times Magazine article, which described Hill as having spent "every waking hour online, tweeting as @nasmaraj". It is also referenced in the music video for "Sun Goes Down", which shows Lil Nas X's many struggles growing up as a closeted teen and embracing his sexuality; he is seen tweeting while in high school from an account named "nasmiraj" as the lyrics "I'd be by the phone, stanning Nicki morning into dawn" play.

Sometime in the year 2018, Hill landed on music as a path to success, and started writing and recording songs in his closet. He adopted the name Lil Nas X, which is a tribute to the rapper Nas. On July 24, 2018, Lil Nas released his first mixtape Nasarati on SoundCloud, though it was not received with immediate fame; Nasarati would be removed from streaming services soon after the release of Old Town Road due to a copyright conflict and therefore would never gain significant traction. In late October 2018, he happened to hear the beat that would become "Old Town Road".

=== 2018–2019: Breakthrough with "Old Town Road" and 7 ===
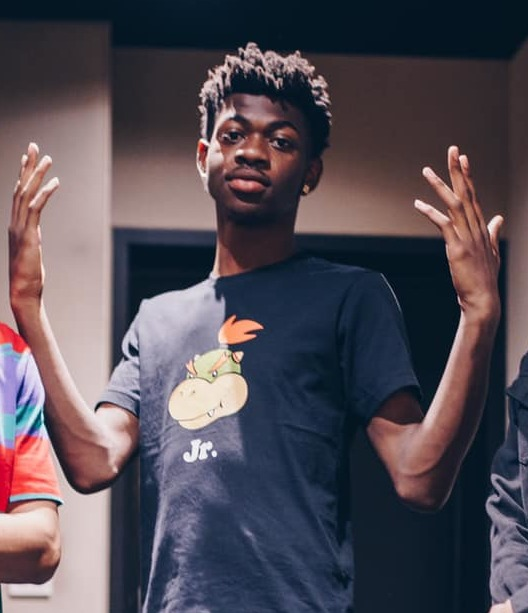
Lil Nas X in April 2019

On December 3, 2018, Lil Nas X released the country rap song "Old Town Road". (Note: "Old Town Road" has been variously described by publications as a country rap, country, trap, or Southern hip-hop song. Lil Nas X stated that he regards it as a "country trap" song.) He bought the beat for the song anonymously on beat-selling platform BeatStars from Dutch producer YoungKio for $30; it samples Nine Inch Nails' track "34 Ghosts IV" from their sixth studio album Ghosts I–IV (2008). He recorded at a "humble" Atlanta studio, CinCoYo, on their "$20 Tuesdays", taking less than an hour. Lil Nas X began creating memes to promote "Old Town Road" before it was picked up by TikTok users. TikTok encourages its 500 million global users to "endless imitation", with videos generating copies usually using the same music; the "app's frantic churn of content [...] acts as a potent incubator for viral music hits."

Lil Nas X estimated he made about 100 memes to promote the song; it went viral in early 2019 due to the #Yeehaw Challenge meme on TikTok. Millions of users posted videos of themselves dressed as a wrangler or cowgirl, with most #yeehaw videos using the song for their soundtrack. As of July 2019, these videos have been viewed more than 67 million times. Another core audience tied to social media is children who are hidden in the statistics of adult listeners. Quartz.com says the song certainly owes part of its success to the demographic, and notes they are attracted to the song being repetitive, easy to sing along to, and using lyrics about riding horses and tractors, which children can relate to. The track debuted at number 83 on the Billboard Hot 100 chart, later climbing to number one. It also debuted on the Hot Country Songs chart at number 19 and Hot R&B/Hip-Hop Songs at number 36. After an "intense bidding war", Lil Nas X signed with Columbia Records in March 2019. Billboard controversially removed the song from the Hot Country songs chart in March 2019, telling Rolling Stone:

When determining genres, a few factors are examined, but first and foremost is a musical composition. While "Old Town Road" incorporates references to country and cowboy imagery, it does not embrace enough elements of today's country music to chart in its current version.

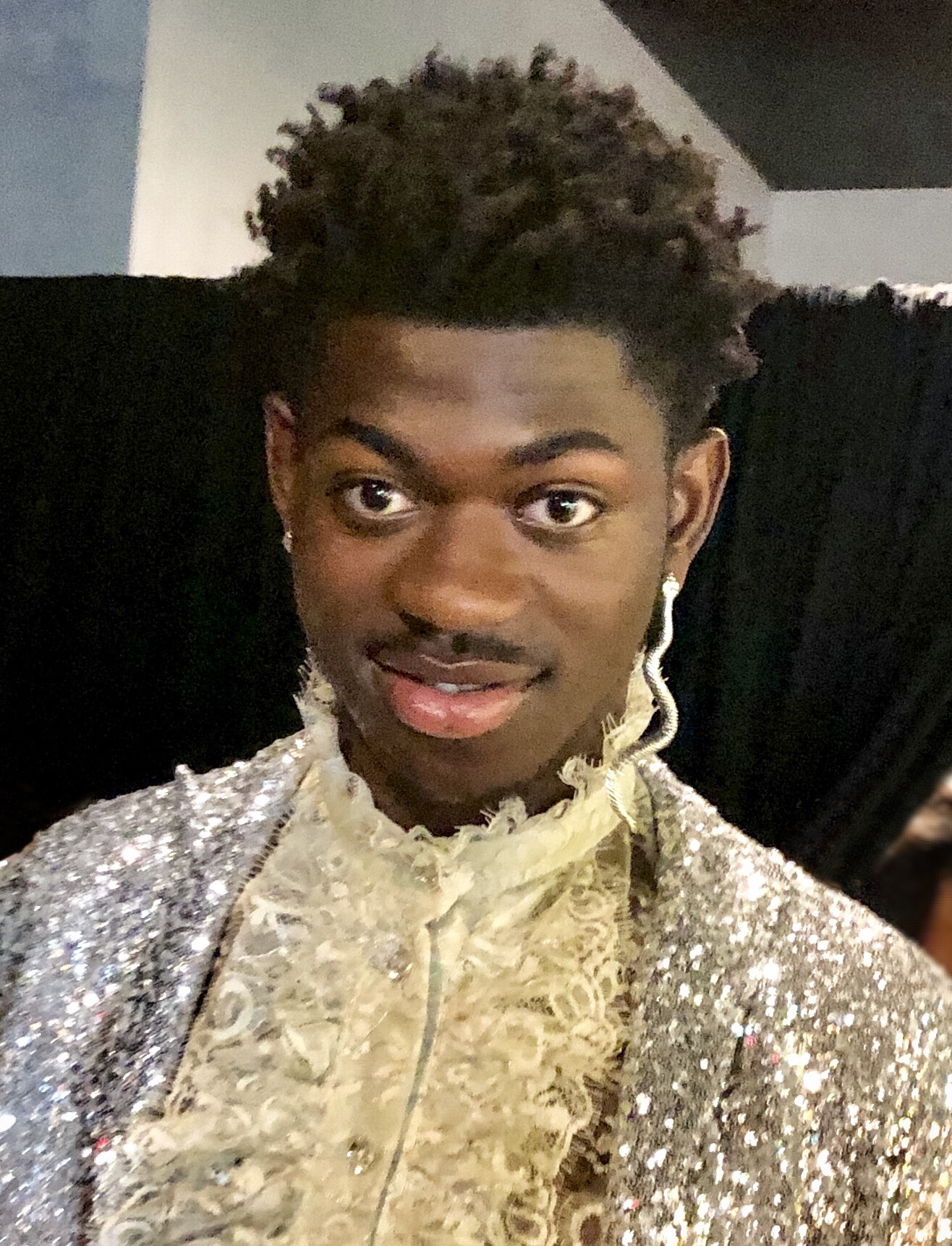
Lil Nas X at the 2019 MTV Video Music Awards

In Robert Christgau's opinion, "Taking 'Old Town Road' off the country chart strikes me as racist pure and simple, because country radio remains racist regardless of the Darius Ruckers and Kane Browns it makes room for." Another Billboard spokesperson told Genius, "Billboard's decision to take the song off of the country chart had absolutely nothing to do with the race of the artist." Despite being removed from the main Country Songs chart, the song charted on Billboard's Country Airplay chart, debuting at 53, and peaking at 50. In response, Sony Music Nashville CEO Randy Goodman told Billboard that his team started testing the song in some country radio markets, adding "it would be negligent not to look at it". In May 2019, the issues of racism in country music culture came up again when Wrangler announced its Lil Nas X collection, and some consumers threatened a boycott. Media outlets also noted that the song brings attention to the historic cultural erasure of African-Americans from both country music and the American frontier era.

In April 2019, country music star Billy Ray Cyrus was featured on a remix of "Old Town Road", the first of several. (Note: The single's second official remix, "Old Town Road" (Diplo Remix), was released on April 29, 2019, featuring additional production by American DJ Diplo. Mid-July 2019, an official remix of "Old Town Road" was released adding rapper Young Thug, and yodeler Mason Ramsey, to Billy Ray Cyrus. In late July 2019, another remix called "Seoul Town Road" was released featuring South Korean rapper RM of the boyband BTS. Billboard counts all the versions of the song in the same total.) That same month, Lil Nas X broke Drake's record for the most U.S. streams from one song in one week with 143 million streams for the week ending April 11, surpassing Drake's "In My Feelings" which had 116.2 million streams in a week in July 2018; as of August 2019 it has streamed over a billion plays on Spotify alone. In May 2019, the video was released and as of August 2019, has over 370 million views. NBC News's Michael Arceneaux wrote, "In the social media age, Lil Nas X is arguably the first micro-platform crossover star."

"Panini" was released as Lil Nas X's second single through Columbia Records on June 20, 2019. It is named after the fictional cabbit bear of the same name in the animated television series Chowder, and does not refer to the sandwich of the same name. In September 2019, "Panini" had its first remix released with rapper DaBaby. Lil Nas X released his second extended play, titled 7, on June 21, 2019. The EP debuted at number two on the Billboard 200 chart. On June 23, 2019, Lil Nas X performed with Cyrus at the 2019 BET Awards. On June 30, Lil Nas X made his international debut at the largest greenfield festival in the world, the UK's annual Glastonbury Festival, when he and Billy Ray Cyrus made a surprise appearance and joined Miley Cyrus for the song, before performing "Panini" solo in a set seen nationally on BBC. On the same day, Lil Nas X became one of the most visible Black queer male singers when he came out as gay. This was especially significant for an artist in the country and hip-hop genres, both of which emphasize machismo and "historically snubbed queer artists". (Note: Rap is full of gay slurs like "sus", "No homo", and "Pause" using "queerness as a punchline".) (Note: Other notable Black queer men who gained mainstream acceptance before Lil Nas X include: Frank Ocean; Tyler, the Creator; ILoveMakonnen; Brockhampton frontman Kevin Abstract; and Steve Lacy. Black queer women artists have been accepted more readily, while the queer hip-hop movement goes back to the 1990s.) Rolling Stone premiered the Rolling Stone Top 100 in early July with three Lil Nas X songs: "Rodeo" with Cardi B at number nine; "Panini" at four; and "Old Town Road" as the first-ever number-one song on the chart. (Note: The Rolling Stone Top 100 tracks "the most popular songs of the week in the United States"; ranked by combining streams and sales, omitting radio plays.)

On August 19, 2019, Lil Nas X opened for Katy Perry at a concert Amazon held for its employees to celebrate its Prime Day sale.

=== 2020–2021: Montero ===
On July 7, 2020, Lil Nas X revealed that his debut album was "almost finished". He also stated that he was working on a mixtape, and invited producers to submit their beats for his new music. On November 8, 2020, he announced a new single, "Holiday", which was released on November 13. On Roblox, a virtual concert was held to promote Lil Nas X's single, with Lil Nas X-related items in the game's avatar shop. The single debuted at 37 on the Billboard Hot 100, while the song's music video accumulated tens of millions of views within the first several weeks of release.

In January 2021, he released a children's book, C Is for Country. The following month, he previewed his new song, "Montero (Call Me by Your Name)" in a Super Bowl LV commercial. The song was officially released on March 26, 2021, along with an accompanying music video. On the same day, Lil Nas X revealed that his debut album would be named Montero, and that it would be released in mid-2021. The video prompted strong reactions. The song was seen by many as a valuable expression of queerness, though prominent conservative and Christian figures accused Lil Nas X of sacrilege and devil worship. Despite the controversy, "Montero (Call Me by Your Name)", debuted at number one on the Billboard Hot 100, becoming Lil Nas X's second chart-topping single and third top-ten single.

On March 29, 2021, Lil Nas X partnered with New York-based art collective MSCHF to release a modified pair of Nike Air Max 97s called Satan Shoes, which may be seen on Satan's feet in the music video used to promote the release of "Montero (Call Me by Your Name)". The shoes are black and red with a bronze pentagram, filled with "60cc and 1 drop of human blood". Only 666 pairs were made at a price of $1,018. Nike said they were uninvolved in the creation and promotion of the shoes and did not endorse the messages of Lil Nas X or MSCHF. The company filed a trademark lawsuit against MSCHF in New York federal court. On April 1, the judge issued a temporary restraining order blocking the sale and distribution of the shoes pending a preliminary injunction. Lil Nas X responded to the lawsuit with a meme on Twitter showing himself as the character Squidward, homeless and asking for money. Later, he released a prelude video for the song "Industry Baby", which stages a fake "Nike vs. Lil Nas X" trial in the Supreme Court, during which people discuss the Satan Shoes before condemning the singer for being gay.

Following the controversies surrounding his previous song and its promotion, Lil Nas X released the more introspective single "Sun Goes Down" on May 21, 2021, wherein he reflects on his struggles with bullying and coming to terms with his homosexuality in his upbringing. He performed the song alongside "Montero (Call Me by Your Name)" at Saturday Night Live a day later, where he suffered a wardrobe malfunction during a pole dance routine when the seam of his trousers split, leaving him unable to finish it properly. On June 29, Lil Nas posted a promotional video of his debut album, ending it with Montero, the Album. He also posted a snippet of a previously teased track called "Industry Baby". The song was released as a single on July 23, featuring rapper Jack Harlow, with production by Kanye West and Take a Daytrip. The song debuted at number two on the Billboard Hot 100 and reached number one on the chart for the ending week of October 23, 2021, becoming Lil Nas X's fourth top-ten single and third number one.

On September 17, 2021, Montero was released, along with its fourth single, "Thats What I Want". On October 23, 2021, Lil Nas X made a surprise appearance at Diplo's set at Electronic Daisy Carnival Las Vegas. During the appearance he performed "Industry Baby", "Montero (Call Me by Your Name)", and "Old Town Road".

On April 26, 2022, he announced his first concert tour, the Long Live Montero Tour. The tour was in support of Montero, and began in September 2022 and ran through January 2023.

=== 2022–present: Dreamboy ===
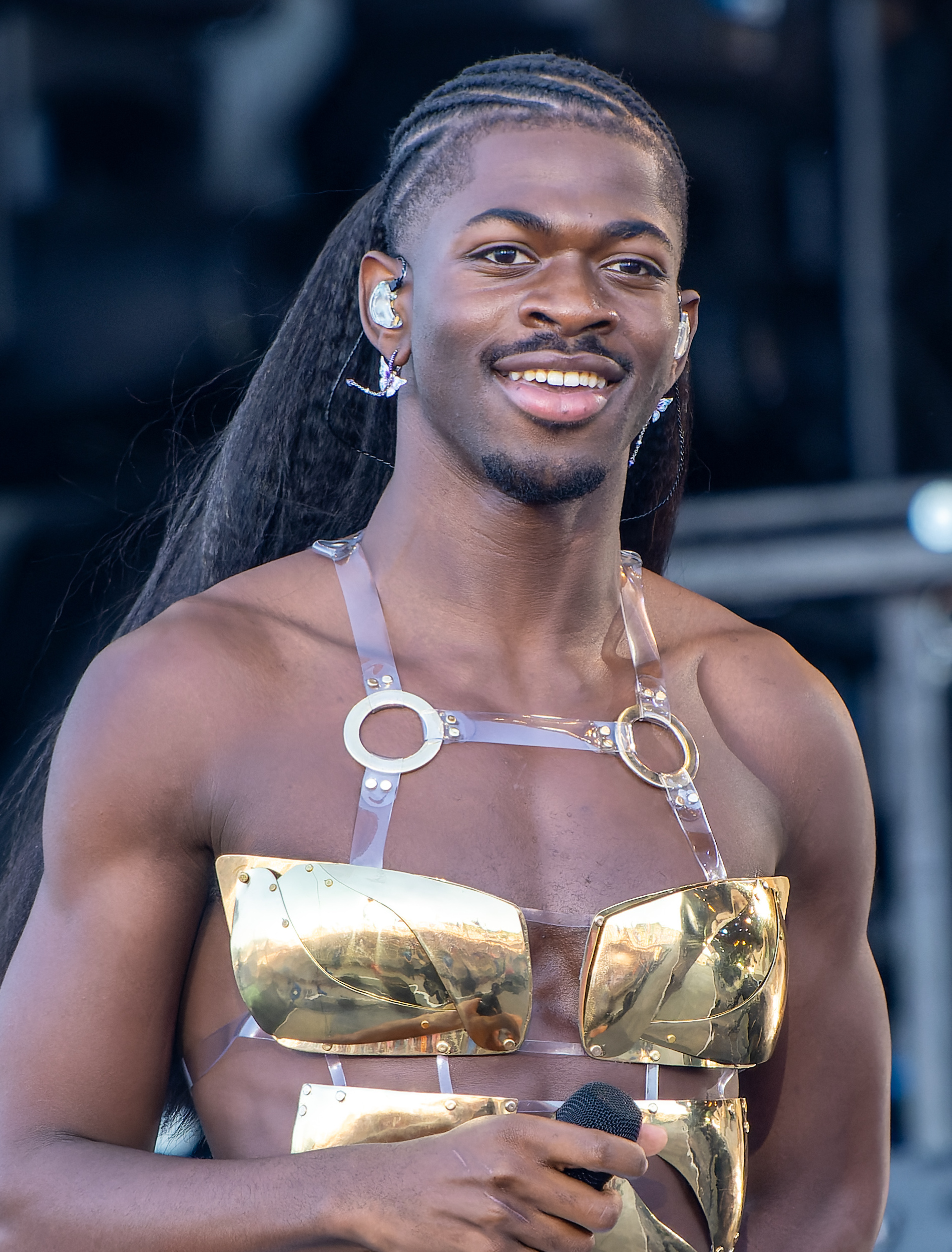
Lil Nas X at the Glastonbury Festival 2023

On March 16, 2022, Lil Nas X returned from his hiatus, and teased two songs from his "almost finished" new album, "Late to da Party" featuring YoungBoy Never Broke Again, and "Down Souf Hoes" featuring Saucy Santana. He also posted a preview of the track "Lean on My Body". "Late to da Party" was eventually released as a single on June 24, 2022. Lil Nas X said that the album would be "something fun, something for the summertime, something for the girls to get ready and party to".

On his Long Live Montero Tour, Lil Nas X performed his then-unreleased single "Star Walkin'" and the intro to "Down Souf Hoes". On September 15, 2022, Riot Games, the developers of the video game League of Legends, announced a collaboration with Lil Nas X for the 2022 League of Legends World Championship through a press release, where they also declared him to be "President of League of Legends", in what Kotaku journalist Isaiah Colbert called a publicity stunt. The anthem for the tournament, "Star Walkin'", was released on September 22 with an accompanying animated music video. He performed the song at the opening ceremony of the tournament on November 5. Additionally, a custom outfit for a playable character in the game co-designed by Lil Nas X was temporarily made available in November.

On October 19, 2022, Lil Nas X invited Saucy Santana on his tour to perform the intro of "Down Souf Hoes" with an additional previously unheard verse. On March 17, 2023, Lil Nas X performed an extended play of the intro of the song during his Lollapalooza Chile performance.

Lil Nas X: Long Live Montero, a documentary film by Carlos López Estrada and Zac Manuel, premiered at the 2023 Toronto International Film Festival. The premiere was delayed by roughly half an hour because of a bomb threat from a caller who supposedly targeted Lil Nas X for being a black queer artist. However, according to a spokesperson for the festival, "To our knowledge, this was a general threat and not directed at the film or the artist." The threat was ultimately proven to not be credible.

On January 3, 2024, Lil Nas X announced the single "J Christ", which was released on January 12. The song debuted and peaked at number 69 on the Billboard Hot 100, marking his first lead single to not reach number one on the chart. His next single, "Where Do We Go Now", was released on January 26, 2024, to accompany the streaming release of the documentary Lil Nas X: Long Live Montero. In March, Lil Nas X released a song he had been teasing on social media titled "Light Again" to his SoundCloud without his label Columbia's permission, to which he added "might get in trouble for releasing this song without [my] label's permission" on X. Lil Nas X was featured on Camila Cabello's single "He Knows" which was released on May 10, 2024.

Following the underperformance of "J Christ", in November 2024 Lil Nas X announced the beginning of a new album titled Dreamboy through a visual teaser on his social media accounts and released "Light Again" as a single. "Light Again" was released as an official single on November 15, 2024. He followed it up with "Need Dat Boy" a week later, with both singles failing to chart on the Billboard Hot 100 and other major charts.

In March 2025, Lil Nas X begun the rollout for his new album, releasing four promotional singles everyday in the lead up to its release. "Dreamboy", "Big Dummy", "Swish", "Right There!" all released that week with a visualizer with Barbie pink-inspired imagery present as well as all featuring the rapper in a pink doll box on the covers. "Hotbox" was released on March 14, 2025.

On October 1, 2026, Lil Nas X released the single "World's Greatest!" and an accompanying music video. The music video was dedicated to his mother, closing with the message "Love u forever mommy".

== Musical style and influences ==
Lil Nas X's music primarily incorporates hip-hop and pop styles, while also being categorized into country rap and pop rap sub-genres.

He credits LGBTQ artists Odd Future members Frank Ocean and Tyler, the Creator as inspirations and for "making it easier for me to be where I am, comfortably." Lil Nas X also cites Nicki Minaj, Katy Perry, Drake, Miley Cyrus and Doja Cat as some of his biggest influences. In 2019 he said, "I grew up off the Internet, so my influences come from all over musically." He grew up listening to hip-hop artists such as Andre 3000, Kendrick Lamar, Kid Cudi, and Lil Uzi Vert.

== Impact ==
Lil Nas X's success caused him to become the first person of color and the first openly gay performer to be listed by Forbes in its annual Highest-Paid Country Acts List. Ken Burns, who produced the PBS documentary Country Music, noted,

"Well, to me, Lil Nas X is my mic drop moment. We spend eight episodes and sixteen and a half hours talking about the fact that country music has never been one thing. ... And there's a huge African American influence, and it permeates throughout the whole story. ... And here we are in a new modern age that we're not touching, with all these classic, binary arguments about Billboard not listing ['Old Town Road'] on the country chart, and it turns out to be not just the No. 1 country hit but the No. 1 single, period, and it's by a black gay rapper! ... It just is proving that all of those cycles that we have been reporting on across the decades—all of the tensions in country music of race, class, poverty, gender, creativity versus commerce, geography—are still going on."

Following the release of the music video for "Montero (Call Me by Your Name)", several outlets praised Lil Nas X for his "unabashedly queer" visuals. Variety's Adam B. Vary wrote that the video "changed everything for queer music artists", noting that some LGBT artists like Jonathan Knight of New Kids on the Block and Lance Bass of NSYNC sang about women while staying closeted, while others like Elton John and Ricky Martin did not explicitly sing about their sexuality. He described the sexual imagery, including the pole dance, as evoking images of Madonna or Janet Jackson, without the need to hide his homosexuality. The negative reception to the song and music video was characterized by Los Angeles Times and Vice as illustrating a Satanic panic and compared to past moments in popular music history, including jazz music being referred to as "the devil's music" in the early 20th century, John Lennon's comment in a 1966 interview that the Beatles were "more popular than Jesus", backmasking accusations, the Parents Music Resource Center's "Filthy Fifteen", Madonna's music video for "Like a Prayer", Lady Gaga's music videos for "Judas" and "Alejandro", and Nicki Minaj's performance of "Roman Holiday" at the 54th Annual Grammy Awards.

== Public image ==
Lil Nas X has been noted for his public fashions; in July 2019, Vogue noted Lil Nas X as a "master" at giving the cowboy aesthetic a glam look in his appearances and on Instagram. His stylist, Hodo Musa, says he aims for items that are "electric, playful, colorful, and futuristic." For his onstage look at the 2019 MTV Video Music Awards he wore a cowboy motif cherry-red Nudie suit. Wrangler, which is mentioned in the "Old Town Road" lyrics, has consistently sold out of Lil Nas X co-branded fashions.

For the 62nd Annual Grammy Awards Lil Nas X wore several outfits including a head-to-toe couture fuchsia Versace suit with a pink harness that took 700 hours to construct. In July 2020, Lil Nas X modeled in a trailer video for a new skincare line by Rihanna's Fenty Beauty.

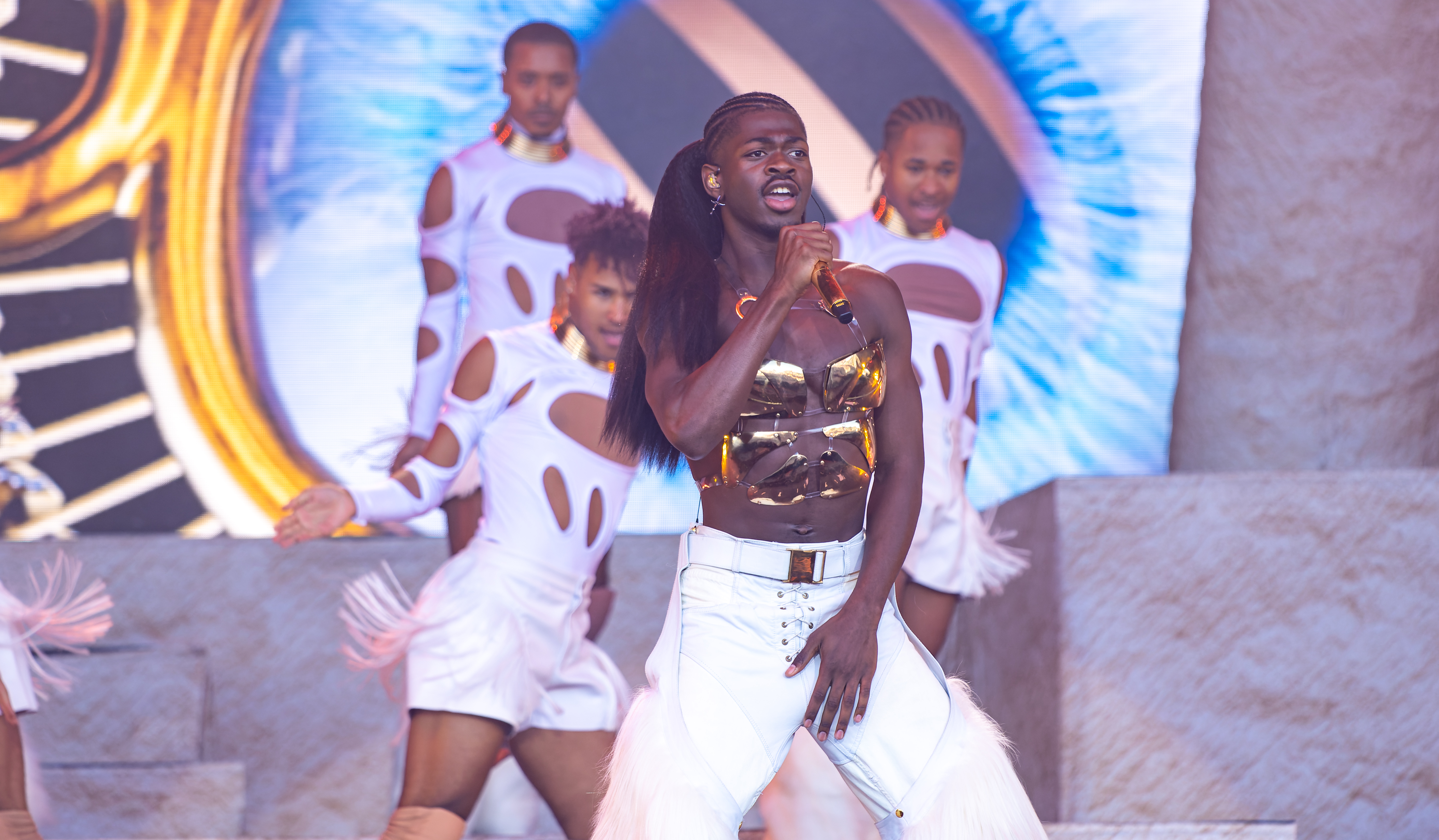
Lil Nas X grabbing his crotch during his performance at the Glastonbury Festival 2023

In August 2021, Lil Nas X commented "Nah he tweakin" on an Instagram post about Tony Hawk selling skateboards painted with paint that contained his blood. It became a viral phenomenon for the next few days. In 2022, he was criticized for repeatedly grabbing his genitals, and placing his microphone at the center of his crotch and swinging it around, pretending the device was his penis, during his performance at the 64th Annual Grammy Awards.

In May 2023, Lil Nas X attended the Met Gala wearing only silver body paint, a thong, and high-heeled platform shoes, with his face covered with rhinestones. His look was inspired by the late German fashion icon Karl Lagerfeld's cat Choupette.

In the lead-up to the release of his album Montero, he hosted a fundraiser for several charities focused on AIDS/HIV prevention in the Southern US. The project raised nearly half a million dollars by March 2022.

== Personal life ==
=== Family ===
Hill announced the death of his mother, Tamikia Hill, on August 29, 2026, sharing a tribute on Instagram while her cause of death remained undisclosed.

=== Sexuality ===
In early June 2019, Hill came out to his sister and father, and he felt "the universe was signaling him to do so" publicly, despite his uncertainty whether his fans would stick by him or not. On June 30, 2019, the last day of Pride Month, Hill came out publicly as gay. His tweet confirmed earlier suspicions when he first indicated this in his track "C7osure (You Like)". Rolling Stone noted the song "touches on themes such as coming clean, growing up and embracing one's self". The next day he tweeted again, this time highlighting the rainbow-colored building on the cover art of his EP 7, with the caption reading "deadass thought i made it obvious". He was unambiguous in an interview several days later on BBC Breakfast, where he stated that he was gay and understands that his sexuality is not readily accepted in the country or rap music communities.

The response to the news was mostly positive, but also garnered a large amount of homophobic backlash on social media, to which Lil Nas X also reacted. The backlash also came from the hip-hop community, drawing attention to homophobia in hip hop culture. In January 2020, rapper Pastor Troy made homophobic comments on the outfit Hill wore during the Grammy Awards, to which Hill responded: "Damn I look good in that pic on god."

In January 2023, Hill tweeted a statement suggesting he was "a little bisexual". The next day he tweeted "that was my last time coming out the closet i promise". In November 2023, he tweeted that he was "still gay".

=== Religion ===
Hill stated in September 2021 that he was an atheist "at one point", but is now "a very spiritual person in terms of the Universe, how everything works." In December 2023, he wrote that he was entering his "Christian era".

=== Politics ===
Hill endorsed Vice President Kamala Harris for president in the 2024 presidential election.

=== Legal issues ===
On August 21, 2025, Hill was arrested in Los Angeles, and briefly hospitalized on suspicion of an overdose. Videos shared by TMZ showed him walking down the middle of Ventura Boulevard at 6 am in white underpants and white boots, while asking the cameraman repeatedly if they were "coming to the party tonight". A spokesperson from the Los Angeles Police Department told Billboard that after police were called, the rapper "charged at officers and was taken into custody"; he was booked into jail on what NBC Los Angeles described as "suspicion of misdemeanor battery on a police officer".

On August 25, 2025, Hill's charges were upgraded to felony charges—three of battery with injury to a police officer, and one of resisting arrest. A judge found his behavior to be "aberrant from his normal conduct" and was related to him being diagnosed with bipolar disorder. Hill was granted mental health diversion on April 6, 2026, and will have the charges dismissed if he continues his treatment for the disorder and obeys all laws for the next two years. In June 2026, he shared a video statement saying he was "doing much better" and felt "less fear in my heart" after completing rehab and returning to his family.

== Accolades ==
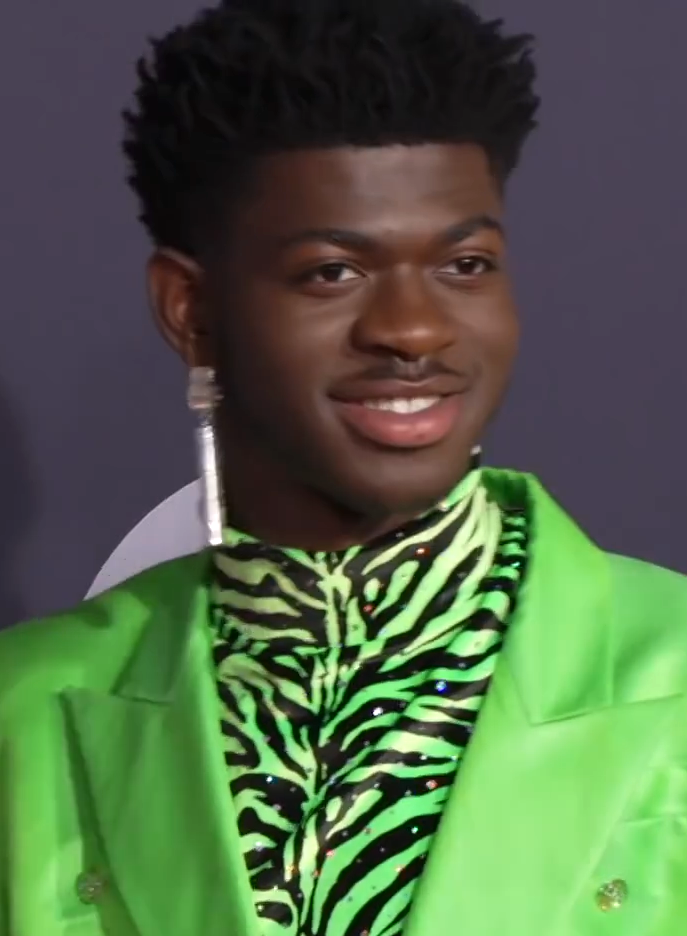
Lil Nas X at the 2019 American Music Awards

Lil Nas X is the recipient of multiple awards including two Grammy Awards, five Billboard Music Awards, five MTV Video Music Awards, two BET Hip Hop Awards, two iHeartRadio Music Awards and two American Music Awards. He has also been awarded by Songwriters Hall of Fame as the youngest honoree of the Hal David Starlight Award.

Lil Nas X was the most-nominated male artist at the 62nd Annual Grammy Awards, where he ultimately won awards for Best Music Video and Best Pop Duo/Group Performance. Lil Nas X is also the first openly LGBT Black artist to win a Country Music Association award and the first openly LGBTQ person to win an MTV Video Music Award for Song of the Year. In 2021, he became the third artist, following Kendrick Lamar and Taylor Swift, to win an MTV Video Music Award for Video of the Year for a video he co-directed – "Montero (Call Me by Your Name)".

Lil Nas X scored three number-one singles on the Billboard Hot 100 chart. In early July 2019, "Old Town Road" achieved its 13th week at the top spot on the Billboard 100, becoming the first hip hop song to do so. (Note: It surpassed three hip hop songs that were tied at twelve weeks each: "Lose Yourself" by Eminem (2002), "Boom Boom Pow" by The Black Eyed Peas (2009), and "See You Again" by Wiz Khalifa featuring Charlie Puth (2015). On its fourteenth week at the top, it was the tenth single to ever reach the mark, with Billboard noting all but two of the previous singles had been nominated for the Grammy Award for Song of the Year.) It is also the first song to sell 10 million copies while in the top spot. On its 15th week at the top, Lil Nas X became the first openly gay artist to have a song last as long, overtaking Elton John's 1997 Double A-Side—where both sides of the record are promoted as hits, "Candle in the Wind 1997"/"Something About the Way You Look Tonight". At 19 weeks at number one, Lil Nas X held the record for the most weeks since the chart was first introduced in 1958, until surpassed by Mariah Carey's 1994 "All I Want for Christmas Is You" in 2025. (Note: Lil Nas X beat two songs tied at sixteen weeks for the longest time to do so; "One Sweet Day" by Mariah Carey and R&B group Boyz II Men (1995–1996); and "Despacito" by Luis Fonsi and Daddy Yankee featuring Justin Bieber (2017).) As of August 2019, the song has also charted 19 weeks atop the Hot R&B/Hip-Hop Songs chart; beating a three-way tie record. (Note: On the Hot R&B/Hip-Hop Songs chart: at nineteen weeks it beats the three songs at eighteen weeks: "The Honeydripper (Parts 1 & 2)" (1945) by Joe Liggins and His Honeydrippers, "Choo Choo Ch'Boogie" (1946) by Louis Jordan and His Tympany Five, and; "One Dance" (2016) by Drake featuring Wizkid and Kyla.) At 19 weeks at the top of the Hot Rap Songs chart the song has also beaten a three-way tie. (Note: Three songs were tied at 18 weeks each: "Hot Boyz" by Missy "Misdemeanor" Elliott featuring Lil' Mo, Nas, Eve and Q-Tip (1999–2000); "Fancy" by Iggy Azalea featuring Charli XCX (2014); and "Hotline Bling" by Drake (2015–2016).) By November 2019, the song was Diamond Certified, moving a combined sales and streaming 10 million units.

Time named him as one of the 25 most influential people on the Internet in 2019, for his "global impact on social media" and "overall ability to drive news". In 2020, he was named on the Forbes 30 Under 30 list. In 2021, he appeared on the Time 100, Time's annual list of the 100 most influential people in the world. On September 1, 2021, The Trevor Project announced that Lil Nas X is the recipient of its inaugural Suicide Prevention Advocate of the Year award.

== Discography ==
Studio albums

- Montero (2021)
- Dreamboy (TBA)

== Tours ==
- Long Live Montero Tour (2022–23)

== Filmography ==
Lil Nas X filmography
Year	Title	Role	Notes
2020, 2023	The Eric Andre Show	Himself	2 episodes
2021	Saturday Night Live	Himself	Musical guest (1 episode)
2021	Dave	Himself	Episode: "Dave"
2022–23	The Proud Family: Louder and Prouder	June Bug (voice)	2 episodes
2023	Lil Nas X: Long Live Montero	Himself	Documentary film
2023	The Bold and the Beautiful	Waiter	Cameo – 9000th episode
2025	Opus	Himself	Cameo appearance; acting film

== See also ==
- List of Billboard Hot 100 chart achievements and milestones
- List of artists who reached number one on the Billboard Hot 100
- List of most-streamed artists on Spotify
- List of bestselling singles worldwide
- LGBTQ culture in New York City
- List of African-American LGBT people
- African-American LGBT community
- LGBTQ representation in country music
- LGBTQ representation in hip hop music
