= Light Again =

2024 single by Lil Nas X

"Light Again!"

Single by Lil Nas X

from the album Dreamboy
- Released: November 15, 2024
- Genre: Pop; pop rap; hip house; electropop
- Length: 2:57
- Label: Columbia
- Songwriters: Montero Hill; Thomas Bangalter; Omer Fedi; Jasper Harris; Denzel Baptiste; David Biral; Nija Charles; Brian Casey; Brandon Casey; Jermaine Dupri; Bryan-Michael Cox
- Producers: Lil Nas X; Take a Daytrip; Thomas Bangalter; Omer Fedi; Jasper Harris

Lil Nas X singles chronology
"Here We Go!" (2024)	"Light Again!" (2024)	"Hotbox" (2025)

Music video
- "Light Again!" on YouTube

"Light Again!" (stylized in all caps) is a song by American rapper Lil Nas X. It features production by Take a Daytrip, Omer Fedi, Jasper Harris, Lil Nas X, and Thomas Bangalter. The song features a sample from "Let's Get Married" by Jagged Edge and interpolates "Cuff It" by Beyoncé. In March 2024, Nas X shared an early demo version of "Light Again" on SoundCloud after sharing a snippet on Instagram. The finished song released on November 15, 2024, through Columbia Records. It is the lead single from his upcoming second studio album, Dreamboy. The song is one of two tracks that he appears on for Madden NFL 25, the other being "He Knows", with Camila Cabello.

== Release ==
On January 31, 2024, Lil Nas X released a snippet of the song on TikTok under the name "Light Again". Due to the attention created by the snippet, on March 29, 2024, Lil Nas X released a demo of the song on SoundCloud.

On November 7, 2024, he announced the song's release for the following Friday. Leading up to the release, a series of promo videos featuring an alternate personality of Lil Nas X, called "Dreamboy", were posted online.

== Music video ==
The music video for "Light Again!" was uploaded on November 15, 2024, on Lil Nas X's YouTube channel through Vevo. It was directed by Andrew Donoho and produced by Landon Kovalick and Sault Levitz. The video starred Lil Nas X alongside lots of his fans at a warehouse party.

== Credits and personnel ==
- Lil Nas X – vocals, production
- Take a Daytrip – production
- Thomas Bangalter – production
- Omer Fedi – production
- Jasper Harris – production
- Randy Merrill – mastering engineer
- Șerban Ghenea – mixing engineer
- Bryce Bordone – assistant engineer

== Charts ==
Chart performance for "Light Again!"
Chart (2024)	Peak position
Lithuania Airplay (TopHit)	64
