= Right There (Lil Nas X song) =

2025 promotional single by Lil Nas X

"Right There!"

Promotional single by Lil Nas X

from the album Dreamboy
- Released: March 13, 2025
- Length: 3:18
- Label: Columbia
- Songwriters: Mark Williams; Raul Cubina; Twisco; Jasper Harris; Jared Solomon; David Sebastian Weaver; Montero Hill
- Producers: Ojivolta; Twisco; Jasper Harris; Solomonophonic

"Right There!" is a song by American rapper Lil Nas X. The song was released as the fifth promotional single from his upcoming second studio album, Dreamboy, on March 13, 2025, via Columbia Records. The song was written by Nas X himself, alongside David Sebastian Weaver and the song's producers, Ojivolta, Twisco, Jasper Harris, and Solomonophonoic. A music video was released on the same day as the song's release.

== Background and release ==
On April 10, 2024, the song was self-released by Lil Nas X on his SoundCloud account as teaser track for a back then upcoming mixtape Nasarati 2. It was later announced that the track was going to be part of Nas' upcoming sophomore studio album Dreamboy, and was officially released as a promotional single on March 13, 2025.

Ken Partridge of Genius described it as a "pop-trap jam". While Aaron Williams of Uproxx, noted that the song was more "house-influenced". According to Josh Kurp of Uproxx, the lyrical content of the song "details a particularly wild night out", and includes references to rappers Papoose, and Remy Ma, and the animated fictional character Jimmy Neutron. Meanwhile, Gary Grimes of Attitude described the track as an "ode to hedonism which hears the rapper extol the virtues of everything from Hennessy and Casamigos to ecstacy and Percoset".

== Music video ==
A visualizer was released the same day as the promotional single on March 13, 2025, on Lil Nas X's YouTube Channel. The video features Nas rapping and wearing a fluffy pink hat in front of a giant pink CD player.

== Credits ==
Credits adapted from Apple Music.

- Lil Nas X — vocals, songwriter
- Twisco — producer, songwriter
- Jasper Harris — producer, songwriter
- Ojivolta — producer
- Solomonophonic — producer, songwriter
- Mark Williams — songwriter
- Raul Cubina — songwriter
- David Sebastian Weaver — songwriter
- Jon Castelli — mixing engineer
- Dale Becker — mastering engineer

== Release history ==
Release dates and formats for "Right There!"
Region	Date	Format	Label	Ref.
Various	April 10, 2024	Digital download	Self-released	
Various	March 13, 2025	Digital download; streaming	Columbia Records	
