= Hotbox (song) =

2025 single by Lil Nas X

Single by Lil Nas X

from the album Dreamboy
- Released: March 14, 2025
- Genre: Pop rap; dance-pop; synth-funk
- Length: 3:02 (single version); 3:19 (extended/video version)
- Label: Columbia
- Songwriters: Montero Hill; David Biral; Denzel Baptiste; Omer Fedi; Raul Cubina; Mark Williams
- Producers: Take a Daytrip; Omer Fedi; Ojivolta

Lil Nas X singles chronology
"Light Again" (2024)	"Hotbox" (2025)	"Lean on My Body" (2025)

"Hotbox" (stylised in all caps) is a song by American rapper Lil Nas X, released on March 14, 2025. It was released as the second single from his third extended play, Days Before Dreamboy, through Columbia Records. The song, a pop rap, dance-pop, and synth-funk record, was written by Nas X himself, alongside the song's producers, Take a Daytrip, Omer Fedi, and Ojivolta.

Upon its release, the song charted at number 57 on TopHit's Lithuania Airplay chart, number 45 on the Czech Republic's Rádio – Top 100 chart, and number 33 on the Official Aotearoa Music Charts in New Zealand, the song's highest position on any chart it made. A music video for the song was also released, which featured an extended version of the song.

== Charts ==
Chart performance for "Hotbox"
Chart (2025)	Peak position
Czech Republic Airplay (ČNS IFPI)	45
Lithuania Airplay (TopHit)	57
New Zealand Hot Singles (RMNZ)	33
