= J Christ =

2024 song by American rapper Lil Nas X

Single by Lil Nas X
- Released: January 12, 2024
- Recorded: 2024
- Genre: Pop rap
- Length: 2:33
- Label: Columbia
- Songwriters: Montero Hill; Mike Lévy; Omer Fedi; Blake Slatkin
- Producers: Gesaffelstein; Omer Fedi; Lil Nas X

Lil Nas X singles chronology
"Star Walkin' (League of Legends Worlds Anthem)" (2022)	"J Christ" (2024)	"Where Do We Go Now?" (2024)

Music video
- "J Christ" on YouTube

"J Christ" (also known as "J Christ (Back Like)") is a song by American rapper Lil Nas X. It was released as a single on January 12, 2024, through Columbia Records.

The song charted at number 69 on the Billboard Charts, 19 on the ARIA New Music Singles Chart, 67 in Canada, 8 in New Zealand, 95 in Switzerland and 59 in the UK, becoming Lil Nas X's first charting single since 2022's "Star Walkin'".

== Background and promotion ==
On January 3, 2024, Lil Nas X announced the release of his next single slated for release on January 12. The rapper then started teasing towards a new era in early January 2024 by setting up a website containing religious and satanic imagery, prompting fans to "save him". He revealed the song title and its artwork on his social media on January 8. In another tweet, Hill shared a short clip promoting the track. "J Christ" precedes the release of his documentary Lil Nas X: Long Live Montero on HBO and Max on January 27.

== Music video ==
The song's music video was written and directed by Lil Nas X, with filming taking place in Mexico City. The music video premiered on January 12, 2024. It starts with a line of look-alikes resembling celebrities such as singers Dolly Parton, Taylor Swift, Ed Sheeran, Mariah Carey, Kanye West, television personality Oprah Winfrey, and former President of the United States Barack Obama walking up a stairway to Heaven. The next shot features Lil Nas X, walking in Heaven after the gates open and waving to a moonwalking Michael Jackson lookalike.

The camera pans down to Hell, with a demonic Lil Nas X now boiling human body parts. Back in Heaven, Lil Nas X plays a basketball game against Satan and scores a slam dunk. Then he performs a cheerleading sequence with other cheerleaders. The next shot features Lil Nas X being crucified similar to Jesus and being praised, before changing to a shot of Lil Nas X shearing a lamb, before panning again to him appearing in a fashion show; the show is watched by Ts Madison, who ends up alarmed with the news of a global flood. The next shot features Lil Nas X, now dressed up like Noah, leading an army of animals to an ark before the huge storm and flood hits; during the flood, Lil Nas X, sporting a golden cross, performs choreography on a rooftop, with a glowing red cross on the right side, which is a possible reference to "Starboy" by The Weeknd. The video ends with Lil Nas X, now on the ark, sailing across the global flood. As sunshine breaks through, text appears on the screen, reading "Day Zero - A New Beginning" and "Therefore, if anyone is in Christ, He is a new creation. The old has passed away; behold, the new has come. (2 Corinthians 5:17)"

== Charts ==
Chart performance for "J Christ"
Chart (2024)	Peak position
Australia Hip Hop/R&B (ARIA)	38
Australia New Music Singles (ARIA)	19
Canada Hot 100 (Billboard)	67
Canada CHR/Top 40 (Billboard)	21
Global 200 (Billboard)	91
Netherlands (Tipparade)	20
New Zealand Hot Singles (RMNZ)	8
Slovakia Airplay (ČNS IFPI)	56
Sweden Heatseeker (Sverigetopplistan)	2
Switzerland (Swiss Hitparade)	95
UK Singles (Official Charts)	59
US Billboard Hot 100	69
US Hot R&B/Hip-Hop Songs (Billboard)	30
US Pop Airplay (Billboard)	21
US Rhythmic Airplay (Billboard)	20

== Release history ==
Release dates and formats for "J Christ"
Region	Date	Format	Label	Ref.
Various	January 12, 2024	Digital download; streaming	Columbia	
Italy	January 12, 2024	Radio airplay	Sony Italy	
