= Lil Nas X: Long Live Montero =

2023 American documentary film

- Directed by: Carlos López Estrada; Zac Manuel
- Produced by: Adriana Arce; Adam Leber; Saul Levitz; Hodo Musa; Gee Roberson
- Starring: Lil Nas X
- Cinematography: Pablo Berron; Zac Manuel
- Edited by: Andrew Morrow
- Production companies: Columbia Records; Museum & Crane; RadicalMedia; Sony Music Vision
- Distributed by: HBO Documentary Films (United States); Universal Pictures Content Group (International)
- Release date: September 9, 2023 (TIFF)
- Running time: 95 minutes
- Country: United States
- Language: English

Lil Nas X: Long Live Montero is a 2023 American documentary film, directed by Carlos López Estrada and Zac Manuel. The film profiles artist Lil Nas X during his 2022 Long Live Montero Tour.

The film premiered at the 2023 Toronto International Film Festival, although the screening at Roy Thomson Hall was briefly delayed by a bomb threat. After the threat was dismissed as not credible, the screening proceeded just half an hour later than scheduled.

The film had its streaming premiere in January 2024 on Max in the United States, and Crave in Canada. Alongside the film, a new Lil Nas X song was released, entitled "Where Do We Go Now?", on the 26th of January, 2024, alongside a music video for the song.

== Reception ==
On the review aggregator website Rotten Tomatoes, 74% of 19 critics' reviews are positive, with an average rating of 6.6/10.
