= Dreamboy (song) =

2025 promotional single by Lil Nas X

Promotional single by Lil Nas X

from the album Dreamboy
- Released: March 10, 2025
- Length: 3:35
- Label: Columbia
- Songwriters: Jahnei Clarke; Roy Lenzo; Ariana Wong; Montero Hill
- Producers: Jahnei Clarke; Roy Lenzo; Ariana Wong

"Dreamboy" is a song by American rapper Lil Nas X, released on March 10, 2025, as the second promotional single from his upcoming second studio album, Dreamboy, through Columbia Records. The song was written by Nas X himself, alongside the song's producers, Jahnei Clarke, Roy Lenzo, and Ariana Wong. A visualizer was also released for the song on the same day as its release.
