= Star Walkin' =

"Star Walkin' (League of Legends Worlds Anthem)"

Single by Lil Nas X
- Released: September 22, 2022
- Genre: Drill; pop-rap; synth-pop
- Length: 3:30
- Label: Columbia; Riot Games
- Songwriters: Montero Hill; Omer Fedi; Henry Walter; Atia "Ink" Boggs
- Producers: Cirkut; Omer Fedi

Lil Nas X singles chronology
"Late to da Party (F*ck BET)" (2022)	"Star Walkin' (League of Legends Worlds Anthem)" (2022)	"J Christ" (2024)

Music video
- "Star Walkin'" on YouTube

"Star Walkin' (League of Legends Worlds Anthem)" is a song by American rapper Lil Nas X. It was released as a single through Columbia Records & Riot Games on September 22, 2022. The anthem for 2022 League of Legends World Championship was written by Lil Nas X, Atia "Ink" Boggs and the song's producers, Cirkut and Omer Fedi.

== Music video ==
An anime-influenced music video was released in September 2022.

== Charts ==
=== Weekly charts ===
Weekly chart performance
Chart (2022–2023)	Peak position
Australia (ARIA)	21
Austria (Ö3 Austria Top 40)	26
Belarus Airplay (TopHit)	4
Belgium (Ultratop 50 Flanders)	26
Belgium (Ultratop 50 Wallonia)	8
Canada Hot 100 (Billboard)	17
Canada CHR/Top 40 (Billboard)	7
Canada Hot AC (Billboard)	19
CIS Airplay (TopHit)	5
Croatia (HRT)	14
Czech Republic Airplay (ČNS IFPI)	4
Czech Republic Singles Digital (ČNS IFPI)	15
Denmark (Tracklisten)	16
Estonia Airplay (TopHit)	6
France (SNEP)	18
Germany (GfK)	11
Global 200 (Billboard)	21
Greece International (IFPI)	9
Hungary (Rádiós Top 40)	24
Hungary (Single Top 40)	17
Hungary (Stream Top 40)	38
Ireland (IRMA)	53
Italy (FIMI)	44
Kazakhstan Airplay (TopHit)	11
Latvia Airplay (LAIPA)	12
Lithuania (AGATA)	22
Netherlands (Dutch Top 40)	8
Netherlands (Single Top 100)	28
New Zealand (Recorded Music NZ)	38
Norway (VG-lista)	27
Poland Airplay (ZPAV)	41
Portugal (AFP)	27
Romania Airplay (Media Forest)	3
Romania TV Airplay (Media Forest)	3
Russia Airplay (TopHit)	8
San Marino (SMRRTV Top 50)	7
Singapore (RIAS)	28
Slovakia Airplay (ČNS IFPI)	5
Slovakia Singles Digital (ČNS IFPI)	15
South Korea Download (Circle)	78
Spain (PROMUSICAE)	96
Sweden (Sverigetopplistan)	29
Switzerland (Schweizer Hitparade)	25
Ukraine Airplay (TopHit)	65
UK Singles (Official Charts)	40
US Billboard Hot 100	32
US Adult Contemporary (Billboard)	27
US Adult Pop Airplay (Billboard)	16
US Dance Airplay (Billboard)	22
US Pop Airplay (Billboard)	10
US Rhythmic Airplay (Billboard)	11
Venezuela Airplay (Record Report)	67
Vietnam (Vietnam Hot 100)	43

=== Monthly charts ===
Monthly chart performance
Chart (2023)	Peak position
Belarus Airplay (TopHit)	4
CIS Airplay (TopHit)	6
Estonia Airplay (TopHit)	9
Kazakhstan Airplay (TopHit)	18
Latvia Airplay (TopHit)	56
Lithuania Airplay (TopHit)	59
Romania Airplay (TopHit)	9
Russia Airplay (TopHit)	9
Ukraine Airplay (TopHit)	65

=== Year-end charts ===
Year-end chart performance
Chart (2022)	Position
Belgium (Ultratop 50 Flanders)	193
Belgium (Ultratop 50 Wallonia)	132
Netherlands (Dutch Top 40)	60

Chart (2023)	Position
Belarus Airplay (TopHit)	4
Belgium (Ultratop 50 Wallonia)	42
Canada (Canadian Hot 100)	61
CIS Airplay (TopHit)	6
Estonia Airplay (TopHit)	38
Germany (Official German Charts)	97
Global Excl. US (Billboard)	190
Kazakhstan Airplay (TopHit)	25
Lithuania Airplay (TopHit)	158
Netherlands (Dutch Top 40)	70
Romania Airplay (TopHit)	20
Russia Airplay (TopHit)	6
Ukraine Airplay (TopHit)	190
US Mainstream Top 40 (Billboard)	41
US Radio Songs (Billboard)	69
US Rhythmic (Billboard)	49

Chart (2024)	Position
Belarus Airplay (TopHit)	172

== Certifications ==
Certifications for "Star Walkin'"
Region	Certification	Certified units/sales
Australia (ARIA)	Platinum	70,000^{‡}
Austria (IFPI Austria)	Gold	15,000^{‡}
Belgium (BRMA)	Gold	20,000^{‡}
Canada (Music Canada)	Gold	40,000^{‡}
Denmark (IFPI Danmark)	Gold	45,000^{‡}
France (SNEP)	Diamond	333,333^{‡}
Germany (BVMI)	Gold	200,000^{‡}
Hungary (MAHASZ)	Platinum	4,000^{‡}
Italy (FIMI)	Platinum	100,000^{‡}
New Zealand (RMNZ)	Gold	15,000^{‡}
Poland (ZPAV)	Platinum	50,000^{‡}
Portugal (AFP)	Gold	5,000^{‡}
Spain (Promusicae)	Gold	30,000^{‡}
Switzerland (IFPI Switzerland)	Gold	10,000^{‡}
United Kingdom (BPI)	Silver	200,000^{‡}
United States (RIAA)	Platinum	1,000,000^{‡}
^{‡} Sales+streaming figures based on certification alone.

== Release history ==
Release history and formats for "Star Walkin'"
Region	Date	Format	Label	Ref.
Various	September 22, 2022	Digital download; streaming	Columbia	
Italy	September 23, 2022	Radio airplay	Columbia	
United States	September 27, 2022	Contemporary hit radio	Columbia	
