= Ari Lennox discography =

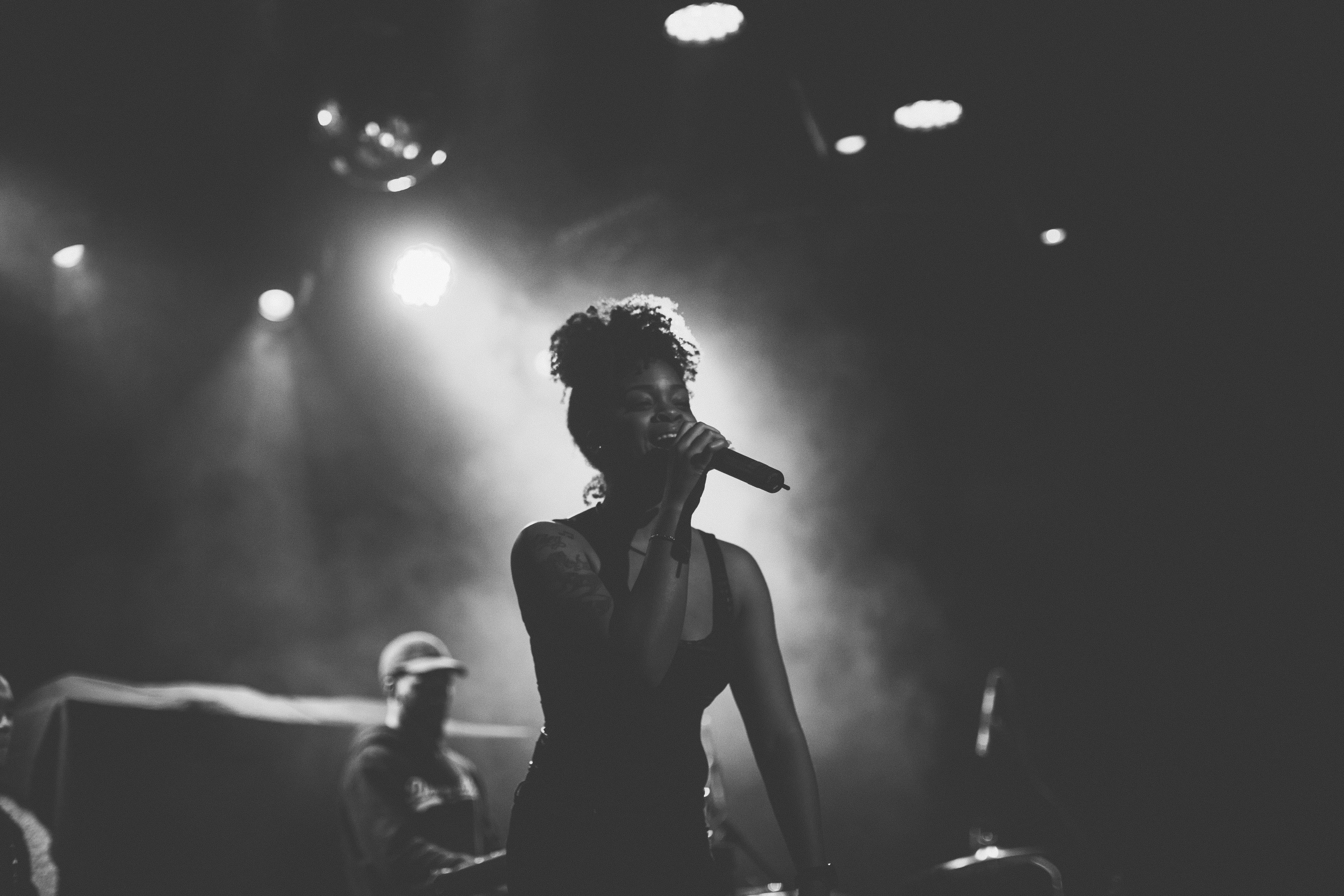
- Ari Lennox performing in 2017
- Studio albums: 3
- EPs: 4
- Singles: 18
- Mixtapes: 1

American singer Ari Lennox has released three studio albums, four extended plays (EPs), one mixtape, and 11 singles (including 7 as a featured artist). She released her debut studio album titled Shea Butter Baby in May 2019. She released her second album Age/Sex/Location in September 2022. Both studio albums were produced through Dreamville Records and Interscope Records. Following her departure from Dreamville in April 2025, Lennox released her third album Vacancy in January 2026 on Interscope.

== Albums ==
=== Studio albums ===
Title	Details	Peak chart positions					Certifications
Title	Details	US	US R&B/ HH	US R&B	UK Dig.	UK R&B	Certifications
Shea Butter Baby	Released: May 7, 2019; Labels: Dreamville, Interscope; Format: LP, digital download, streaming	67	38	7	—	—	RIAA: Gold
Age/Sex/Location	Released: September 9, 2022; Labels: Dreamville, Interscope; Format: LP, digital download, streaming	69	36	13	53	39	
Vacancy	Released: January 23, 2026; Labels: Interscope; Format: LP, digital download, streaming	172	—	25	—	—	
"—" denotes a recording that did not chart or was not released in that territory.

=== Compilation albums ===
List of albums, with selected chart positions
Title	Album details	Peak chart positions			Certifications
Title	Album details	US	US R&B/HH	US Rap	Certifications
Revenge of the Dreamers II (with Dreamville)	Released: December 8, 2015; Label: Dreamville, Interscope; Format: CD, digital download	29	4	3	
Revenge of the Dreamers III (with Dreamville)	Released: July 5, 2019; Label: Dreamville, Interscope; Format: CD, LP, digital download	1	1	1	RIAA: Platinum
D-Day: A Gangsta Grillz Mixtape (with Dreamville)	Released: March 31, 2022; Label: Dreamville, Interscope; Format: Digital download	11	6	4	

=== Extended plays ===
List of extended plays, with selected details
Title	EP details	Peak chart positions		
Title	EP details	US Heat	US R&B/HH	US R&B
Ariography	Released: October 22, 2013; Format: Digital download	—	—	—
Pho	Released: October 21, 2016; Label: Dreamville, Interscope; Format: LP, Digital download	21	40	20
Shea Butter Baby (Remix EP)	Released: March 27, 2020; Label: Dreamville, Interscope; Format: Digital download	—	—	—
Away Message	Released: August 31, 2022; Label: Dreamville, Interscope; Format: Digital download	—	—	—
"—" denotes a recording that did not chart or was not released in that territory.

=== Mixtapes ===
Title	Details
Five Finger Discount	Released: January 5, 2012; Format: Digital download

== Singles ==
=== As lead artist ===
Title	Year	Peak chart positions					Certifications	Album
Title	Year	US	US R&B/HH	US R&B	US Adult R&B	NZ Hot	Certifications	Album
"Bound"	2014	—	—	—	—	—		Non-album single
"Backseat" (featuring Cozz)	2016	—	—	—	—	—		Pho
"Whipped Cream"	2018	—	—	—	—	—	RIAA: Gold	Shea Butter Baby
"Shea Butter Baby" (with J. Cole)	2019	—	— (Note: "Shea Butter Baby" did not enter the Hot R&B/Hip-Hop Songs chart, but peaked at number 44 on the R&B/Hip-Hop Airplay chart.)	—	26	—	RIAA: Platinum; RMNZ: Gold	Shea Butter Baby
"Got Me" (Dreamville with Omen featuring Ty Dolla Sign & Dreezy)	2019	—	— (Note: "Got Me" did not enter the Hot R&B/Hip-Hop Songs chart, but peaked at number 3 on the Bubbling Under R&B/Hip-Hop Singles chart.)	11	—	—	RIAA: Gold	Revenge of the Dreamers III
"BMO"	2019	—	— (Note: "BMO" did not enter the Hot R&B/Hip-Hop Songs chart, but peaked at number 17 on the R&B/Hip-Hop Airplay chart.)	17	—	—	RIAA: Platinum	Shea Butter Baby
"Bussit" (with Dreamville)	2020	—	—	—	—	—		Revenge of the Dreamers III: Director's Cut
"Pressure"	2021	66	20	8	1	29	RIAA: Gold; RMNZ: Gold	Age/Sex/Location
"Hoodie"	2022	—	—	—	—	—		Age/Sex/Location
"Waste My Time"	2022	—	— (Note: "Waste My Time" did not enter the Hot R&B/Hip-Hop Songs chart, but peaked at number 16 on the R&B/Hip-Hop Airplay chart.)	—	1	—		Age/Sex/Location
"Get Close"	2023	—	—	24	—	—		Non-album singles
"Smoke"	2024	—	—	—	18	—		Non-album singles
"Soft Girl Era"	2025	—	— (Note: "Soft Girl Era" did not enter the Hot R&B/Hip-Hop Songs chart, but peaked at number 28 on the R&B/Hip-Hop Airplay chart.)	—	30	—		Vacancy
"Vacancy"	2025	—	— (Note: "Vacancy" did not enter the Hot R&B/Hip-Hop Songs chart, but peaked at number 24 on the R&B/Hip-Hop Airplay chart.)	—	5	—		Vacancy
"Under the Moon"	2025	—	—	—	—	—		Vacancy
"Twin Flame"	2026	—	—	—	—	—		Vacancy
"Hookah Baby"	2026	—	—	—	—	—		Vacancy
"—" denotes a recording that did not chart or was not released in that territory.

=== As featured artist ===
List of singles as a featured artist, showing year released and album name
Title	Year	Peak chart positions			Album
Title	Year	US R&B/HH Air.	US R&B	NZ Hot	Album
"Nothing but the Best" (EarthGang featuring Ari Lennox)	2018	—	—	—	Royalty
"Chocolate." (Kiana Ledé featuring Ari Lennox)	2020	—	—	28	Kiki
"Make Me Feel" (Skip Marley featuring Ari Lennox and Rick Ross)	2020	47	—	—	Higher Place
"Black And White" (Nasty C featuring Ari Lennox)	2020	—	—	24	Zulu Man with Some Power
"Set Him Up" (Queen Naija featuring Ari Lennox)	2021	—	14	—	Misunderstood...Still
"Tidal Wave" (Njomza featuring Ari Lennox)	2021	—	—	—	Limbo
"November" (ARTZ featuring Ari Lennox)	2021	—	—	—	Non-album single
"Demon Time (Remix)" (Alex Vaughn featuring Ari Lennox)	2023	—	—	—	The Hurtbook
"My Phone Can Die" (Rory featuring Ari Lennox & James Fauntleroy)	2023	—	—	—	I Thought It’d Be Different
"War" (Camper featuring Ari Lennox and Jeremih)	2024	—	—	—	TBA
"Stay Awhile" (Foggieraw featuring Ari Lennox)	2024	—	—	—	TBA
"Just Like That" (Jessie Reyez featuring Ari Lennox)	2024	—	—	—	Paid in Memories
"Gaslight" (Eric Benét featuring Ari Lennox)	2025	—	—	—	The Co-Star
"—" denotes a recording that did not chart or was not released in that territory.

=== Promotional singles ===
List of promotional singles, showing year released and album name
Title	Year	Album
"40 Shades of Choke"	2018	Non-album promotional singles
"Grampa"	2018	Non-album promotional singles
"Pedigree"	2018	Non-album promotional singles
"No One"	2018	Non-album promotional singles
"If You Want Me to Stay" (with Anthony Ramos)	2020	Non-album promotional singles
"Grounded"	2020	Non-album promotional singles
"Chocolate Pomegranate"	2020	Non-album promotional singles
"My Favorite Things"	2021	Non-album promotional singles
"A Kind Of Magic"	2022	Non-album promotional singles
"Queen Space" (with Summer Walker)	2022	Away Message and Age/Sex/Location

== Other charted songs ==
List of songs, with selected chart positions, showing year released and album name
Title	Year	Peak chart positions						Certifications	Album
Title	Year	US	US R&B/HH	US R&B	US Rap	CAN	UK	Certifications	Album
"Change" (J. Cole) (Note: "Change" features vocals by Ari Lennox)	2016	21	11	—	9	23	63	RIAA: Platinum	4 Your Eyez Only
"Self Love" (Dreamville, Ari Lennox and Bas featuring Baby Rose)	2019	—	—	21	—	—	—		Revenge of the Dreamers III
"On It" (Jazmine Sullivan featuring Ari Lennox)	2021	— (Note: "On It" did not enter the Billboard Hot 100, but peaked at number 7 on the Bubbling Under Hot 100 Singles chart.)	40	12	—	—	—	RIAA: Platinum	Heaux Tales
"Unloyal" (Summer Walker featuring Ari Lennox)	2021	48	17	10	—	—	—	RIAA: Gold	Still Over It
"Coming Down"	2022	—	—	23	—	—	—		D-Day: A Gangsta Grillz Mixtape
"Blackberry Sap"	2022	—	—	21	—	—	—		D-Day: A Gangsta Grillz Mixtape
"High Key"	2026	—	—	23	—	—	—		Vacancy
"—" denotes a recording that did not chart or was not released in that territory.

== Guest appearances ==
List of non-single guest appearances, with other performing artists, showing year released and album name
Title	Year	Other artist(s)	Album
"Tell Me"	2014	Felly	Milk & Sugar
"Sweat It Out"	2015	Omen	Elephant Eyes
"Icarus"	2018	Bas	Milky Way
"Sugar Walls" (Note: "Sugar Walls" features background vocals by Ari Lennox)	2018	Masego	Lady Lady
"Link Up"	2019	Buddy, Bas, Guapdad 4000, Kent Jamz, JID	Harlan & Alondra
"Don't Hit Me Right Now" (Note: "Don't Hit Me Right Now" features background vocals by Ari Lennox)	2019	Bas, Cozz, Yung Baby Tate, Buddy, Guapdad 4000	Revenge of the Dreamers III
"I Got You (Always and Forever)"	2019	Chance the Rapper, En Vogue, Kierra Sheard	The Big Day
"Amnesia"	2019	Bas, Kiddominant	Spilled Milk 1
"Time Today (Remix)"	2019	BJ the Chicago Kid	1123 (Deluxe Edition)
"Cliché"	2019	Wale, Boogie	Wow... That's Crazy
"Cool Off The Rain (Remix)"	2019	VanJess	Silk Canvas (The Remixes)
"Passcode"	2020	Buddy, Smino, Mez, Guapdad 4000	Revenge of the Dreamers III: Director's Cut
"Revenge"	2020	Lute, Omen, EarthGang, Childish Major, Reason	Revenge of the Dreamers III: Director's Cut
"Real Body"	2020	D Smoke	Black Habits
"Black Men Don't Cheat"	2020	K Camp, 6lack, Tink	Kiss Five
"Long Nights" (Note: "Long Nights" features background vocals by Ari Lennox)	2020	6lack	6pc Hot EP
"Marigold"	2020	Dave James, Mannywellz	—N/a
"Judas"	2020	Spillage Village, JID, Buddy, Chance the Rapper, Masego	Spilligion
"Sorrow Tears and Blood"	2020	GoldLink	Stand Up: A Global Citizen Prize Project
"Chocolate"	2020	Kiana Ledé	Kiki
"Ari's Tale"	2021	—N/a	Heaux Tales
"Access Denied"	2021	Lucky Daye	Table for Two
"Bed of Lies"	2021	JaeRene	Unfinished
"Juicy"	2021	Vedo	1320
"Every Part of Me"	2021	Theo Croker	BLK2LIFE: A FUTURE PAST
"Ghetto Love"	2021	Lute, Blakk Soul	Gold Mouf
"Scenic Drive"	2021	Khalid, Smino	Scenic Drive
"Run Too"	2022	EarthGang	Ghetto Gods
"Coolest Things"	2022	Buddy	Superghetto
"Coming Down"	2022	—N/a	D-Day: A Gangsta Grillz Mixtape
"Blackberry Sap"	2022	—N/a	D-Day: A Gangsta Grillz Mixtape
"The Others"	2022	Bas	[BUMP] Pick Me Up
"What It Is"	2022	Arin Ray	Hello Poison
