= Elite (music producer) =

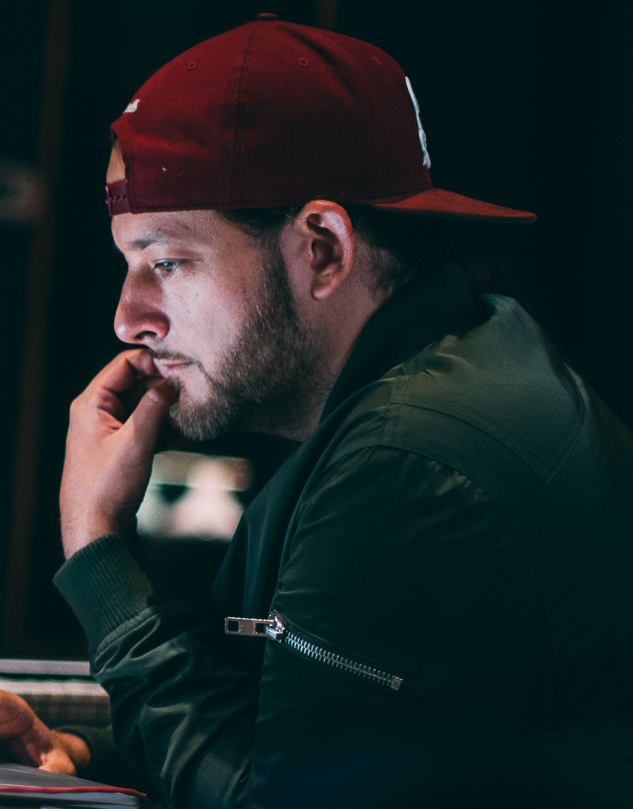
- Elite in 2017

Background information
- Born: Anthony Parrino; January 4, 1983 (age 43)
- Genres: Hip-Hop, R&B
- Occupations: Record producer, artist
- Years active: 2002–present
- Label: Dreamville Records
- Website: www.elitethatsme.com

Anthony Parrino (born January 4, 1983), better known by his stage name Elite, is an American hip-hop and R&B record producer and recording artist best known for his work with J. Cole, Dreamville Records, and the Ruff Ryders recording label in the early 2000s. Elite is from Byram, Connecticut and resides in Los Angeles, California.

== Career ==
In mid 2000, Elite started working as an intern for Ruff Ryders Entertainment and eventually caught the ear of rapper Drag-On, placing his first produced song on the Cradle 2 the Grave soundtrack in 2002. Working as an in-house producer for Ruff Ryders, Elite went on to produce "Shoot Outs" for Jadakiss featuring Styles P from Kiss of Death as well as the "Why Remix" featuring Anthony Hamilton, Styles P, Common, and Nas. In 2004 Elite graduated cum laude from SUNY Purchase music conservatory studying Studio Production. In 2006 Elite produced "Wrong or Right (I'm Tired)" for DMX from the album Year of the Dog... Again.

In 2009, Elite began working with longtime friend and Roc Nation recording artist J. Cole on his mixtape The Warm Up. Elite produced "Heartache" and a good portion of the mixtape was recorded at his home studio in New York. In 2010, Elite released his first mixtape entitled "The Groundwork" which was a collection of all of his production work up to that point. The mixtape featured an unreleased J. Cole song titled "Playground". Elite also produced "See World" for J. Cole off of his third mixtape, Friday Night Lights. Elite co-produced J. Cole's first single "Who Dat" which was featured as an iTunes bonus on Cole World: The Sideline Story.

In 2011, Elite released his first project as an artist entitled "Awaken" which featured J. Cole, Omen, Voli and Sean McVerry.

Elite worked on multiple songs on J. Cole's second album Born Sinner, co-producing the title track "Born Sinner", and adding additional production to "Runaway". Cole sampled the song "Do She Got a Friend Tho?" from Elite's mixtape "Level Up" on the standout "Let Nas Down". In June 2013, J. Cole released his second single from Born Sinner titled "Crooked Smile" which was co-produced by Elite and features TLC.

Elite worked together with J. Cole once more on the song "Folgers Crystals" from the 2015 work Revenge Of The Dreamers II, he also produced the song "48 Laws" by Omen feat. Donnie Trumpet from the same album.

In December 2016, J. Cole released his fourth studio album 4 Your Eyez Only, which was co-executive produced by Elite.

In April 2018, J. Cole released his fifth studio album KOD, which featured co-production from Elite on a majority of the album.

In May 2019, Ari Lennox released her debut studio album Shea Butter Baby, executive produced by Elite. Two of the album's lead singles (released in 2018) were produced by Elite; Whipped Cream and the title track Shea Butter Baby (feat. J. Cole), first appearing on the Creed II Soundtrack.

== Discography ==
=== Mixtapes ===
- 2010: The Groundwork
- 2011: Awaken
- 2013: Level Up

== Production discography ==
List of songs as producer or co-producer, with performing artists and other credited producers, showing year released and album name.

Title	Year	Performing artist(s)	Other producer(s)	Album
Fireman	2003	Drag-On		Cradle 2 the Grave OST
Peel Off	2003	Jin		2 Fast 2 Furious OST
Let's Ride	2003	Diplomats (feat. Juelz Santana & Jim Jones)		AND 1 Mixtape
The Race	2003	Drag-On		B-Side Single
Shoot Outs	2004	Jadakiss (feat. Styles P)		Kiss of Death
Why Remix	2004	Jadakiss (feat. Nas, Common, Styles P, Anthony Hamilton)		Single
Fight Muzik	2005	Joe Budden		Mood Muzik 1
Gun Ho City	2005	Kool G Rap (feat. Canibus)		DJ Whoo Kid & Kool G Rap: Dead or Alive Mixtape
Penitentiary Chances	2005	Jim Jones (feat. Hell Rell)		Harlem: Diary of a Summer
Wrong or Right	2006	DMX (feat. Bazaar Royale)		Year of the Dog... Again
Shots Fired	2007	Styles P (feat. Jadakiss)		
Heartache	2009	J. Cole		The Warm Up Mixtape
Playground	2010	J. Cole		The Groundwork Mixtape
Who Dat	2011	J. Cole	J. Cole	Cole World: The Sideline Story (iTunes Bonus)
See World	2011	J. Cole	J. Cole	Friday Night Lights Mixtape
Return of Simba	2011	J. Cole	J. Cole	
Visionz of Home	2012	J. Cole		
Lookin' Without Seein	2012	DMX		Undisputed
Fuck U Bitch (Silver Shadow)	2012	DMX		Undisputed (Deluxe Edition)
Let Nas Down (Sampled)	2013	J. Cole	J. Cole	Born Sinner
Runaway *	2013	J. Cole	J. Cole, Ron Gilmore	Born Sinner
Born Sinner	2013	J. Cole (feat. James Fauntleroy)	J. Cole	Born Sinner
Crooked Smile	2013	J. Cole (feat. TLC)	J. Cole	Born Sinner
The Coming	2014	King Mez		
48 Laws	2015	Omen (feat. Donnie Trumpet)		Revenge of the Dreamers II
Folgers Crystals	2015	J. Cole	J. Cole	Revenge of the Dreamers II
Natalie	2016	Sean McVerry	Sean McVerry	Hourglass Switchboard 1
Kerosene	2016	Sean McVerry	Sean McVerry	Hourglass Switchboard 1
Marcy and the Apparition	2016	Sean McVerry	Sean McVerry	Hourglass Switchboard 1
Christina	2016	Sean McVerry	Sean McVerry	Hourglass Switchboard 1
Strangers	2016	Sean McVerry	Sean McVerry	Hourglass Switchboard 2
Tiger Lily	2016	Sean McVerry	Sean McVerry	Hourglass Switchboard 2
Motion Picture Films	2016	Sean McVerry	Sean McVerry	Hourglass Switchboard 2
Christina's Ringtone	2016	Sean McVerry	Sean McVerry	Hourglass Switchboard 2
Willow Tree	2016	Spillage Village (feat. JID, Jordxn Bryant, EarthGang)	Ron Gilmore, J. Cole	Bears Like Too Much
4 Your Eyez Only (Album) +	2016	J. Cole	J. Cole	4 Your Eyez Only
Ville Mentality	2016	J. Cole	Ron Gilmore, J. Cole	4 Your Eyez Only
She's Mine Pt. 1 *	2016	J. Cole	J. Cole, Deputy, Ron Gilmore, Chargaux	4 Your Eyez Only
Change *	2016	J. Cole	J. Cole, Ron Gilmore	4 Your Eyez Only
Neighbors *	2016	J. Cole	J. Cole	4 Your Eyez Only
Foldin Clothes *	2016	J. Cole	J. Cole, Ron Gilmore	4 Your Eyez Only
She's Mine Pt. 2 *	2016	J. Cole	J. Cole, Deputy, Ron Gilmore, Chargaux	4 Your Eyez Only
4 Your Eyez Only	2016	J. Cole	BLVK, J. Cole, Childish Major	4 Your Eyez Only
High For Hours	2017	J. Cole	Cam O'bi, Ron Gilmore	
Meditate	2017	EarthGang (feat. JID)	Childish Major	Rags - EP
Ambitions	2017	Lute	Sean McVerry	West 1996 Pt. 2
Freaky 45	2018	Cozz	Ron Gilmore	Effected
The Cut Off *	2018	J. Cole feat. Kill Edward	J. Cole, BLVK	KOD
Kevin's Heart *	2018	J. Cole	T-Minus, Mark Pellizzer	KOD
Brackets *	2018	J. Cole	J. Cole	KOD
Once An Addict (Interlude) *	2018	J. Cole	J. Cole, Ron Gilmore	KOD
Friends *	2018	J. Cole feat. Kill Edward	J. Cole	KOD
Window Pain (Outro) *	2018	J. Cole	J. Cole	KOD
Whipped Cream	2018	Ari Lennox	Ron Gilmore	Single
Stuck	2018	EarthGang (feat. Arin Ray)	Malik, Ron Gilmore	Mirrorland
Grampa	2018	Ari Lennox		Single
Shea Butter Baby	2018	Ari Lennox & J. Cole	Shroom	Creed II: The Album
Tiiied	2018	JID feat. 6lack & Ella Mai	Ron Gilmore	DiCaprio 2
Shea Butter Baby (Album) +	2019	Ari Lennox		Shea Butter Baby
Chicago Boy	2019	Ari Lennox	Ron Gilmore	Shea Butter Baby
BMO *	2019	Ari Lennox	Omen	Shea Butter Baby
Broke *	2019	Ari Lennox	Christo, Ron Gilmore, Deputy	Shea Butter Baby
Speak To Me	2019	Ari Lennox	Ron Gilmore	Shea Butter Baby
New Apartment *	2019	Ari Lennox	DJ Grumble	Shea Butter Baby
Static	2019	Ari Lennox		Shea Butter Baby
1993	2019	Dreamville, J. Cole, JID, Cozz, EARTHGANG, Smino, Buddy		Revenge of the Dreamers III
BUSSIT	2019	Ari Lennox	Brilliant Mack, Dijon Stylez	Revenge of the Dreamers III: Director's Cut
Tequila	2019	EarthGang (featuring T-Pain)		Mirrorland
End of Daze (feat. EARTHGANG, JID, Jurdan Bryant, Mereba, and Hollywood JB)	2020	Spillage Village	Christo, Mike Dean, Jay Card, Nicerec, Olu	Spilligion
Might Not Make It	2020	Reason		Single
Chocolate Pomegranate	2020	Ari Lennox		Single
If You Want Me To Stay	2020	Ari Lennox & Anthony Ramos	William Wells	Single
Grounded	2020	Ari Lennox	Joe Endozo	Single
Rider	2021	Mereba	KQuick	AZEB
Pressure *	2021	Ari Lennox	Bryan-Michael Cox, Jermaine Dupri	age/sex/location
Cry	2021	Cozz	Jay Kurzweil	Fortunate
Born Singer	2022	BTS		Proof
Can't Make U Change (feat. Ari Lennox)	2022	JID	Cristo	The Forever Story
Gummy	2022	Ari Lennox	Deputy	Away Message
Bitter	2022	Ari Lennox		Away Message
age/sex/location (Album) +	2022	Ari Lennox		age/sex/location
Queen Space (feat. Summer Walker)	2022	Ari Lennox	Dre Pickney	age/sex/location
Hoodie	2022	Ari Lennox		age/sex/location
A/S/L (Interlude)	2022	Ari Lennox		age/sex/location
Mean Mug	2022	Ari Lennox	Wu10	age/sex/location
Boy Bye (feat. Lucky Daye)	2022	Ari Lennox		age/sex/location
Outside *	2022	Ari Lennox	Organized Noize	age/sex/location
Blocking You *	2022	Ari Lennox	DZL, Slimwave, Ron Gilmore	age/sex/location
Culture	2023	Mez, Reason, Symba, 8AE	Cardiak, Plus, Mario Luciano	Creed III: The Soundtrack
Greater	2023	Ari Lennox	Wu10	Creed III: The Soundtrack
Hate Me Now	2023	Arin Ray, Mereba, Omen	Yuli, Jay Kurzweil, SoundWavVe, Sensei Bueno, Sonic Major, Jaasu	Creed III: The Soundtrack
Burn Bridges	2023	Lute, Cozz, Reason, Arin Ray	Al Hug, Ruck P	Creed III: The Soundtrack
Alibi	2025	Omen	Omen	Single
Under The Moon	2025	Ari Lennox	Dave James, Ron Gilmore, Tommy Parker	Vacancy
Clue	2025	Russ	Evince, Sett	Single
crystal waterfalls	2025	Theo Croker	Theo Croker	crystal waterfalls
Vacancy (Album) +	2026	Ari Lennox		Vacancy
Mobbin in DC	2026	Ari Lennox	Napes	Vacancy
Horoscope	2026	Ari Lennox	Al Hug, Ruck P	Vacancy
Dreaming	2026	Ari Lennox	Dave James, Ron Gilmore, Tommy Parker	Vacancy
Far From An Angel	2026	Sekou	Jeff Gitty	In A World We Don't Belong
Pocahontas	2026	Cozz	Jay Kurzweil	Single

* Indicates "Additional Production" credit

+ Indicates "Executive Production" credit

== TV Scoring ==
Network	Year	Segment
CBS	2003	CSI: Miami, "The Best Defense"
ESPN	2006	NBA On ESPN
ABC	2006	NBA Finals
