= Creed III (soundtrack) =

Soundtrack album to the 2023 film

Creed III: The Soundtrack

Soundtrack album by Dreamville
- Released: March 3, 2023
- Genres: Hip hop; R&B; Afrobeats
- Length: 56:37
- Labels: Dreamville; Interscope
- Producers: Bass Charity; Ben10k; Cardiak; Christo; ClickNPress; Corbett; Dr. Dre; Elite; Hit-Boy; Jaasu; JetsonMade; Kay; Kel P; Kurzweil; Lonestarrmuzik; LordQuest; Mario Luciano; Mr. Franks; Mr. Parker; PG RA; Pluss; S1; Sensei Bueno; Sonic Major; Soundwavve; Super Miles; Taylor Hill; Tommy Brown; Tommy Parker; Ty Dolla $ign; WU10; Yuli

Dreamville chronology
D-Day: A Gangsta Grillz Mixtape (2022)	Creed III: The Soundtrack (2023)

Singles from Creed III: The Soundtrack
- 1. "Ma Boy" Released: February 3, 2023; 2. "Blood, Sweat & Tears" Released: February 22, 2023

The 2023 American sports drama film Creed III, the third in the Creed series and the overall ninth installment in the Rocky franchise, was accompanied by two soundtrack albums. Creed III: The Soundtrack, featuring original songs executive produced by Dreamville, and Creed III: Original Motion Picture Soundtrack, featuring an original score composed by Joseph Shirley, were both released on March 3, 2023.

The original soundtrack includes contributions from Dreamville artists, J. Cole, Bas, Cozz, Omen, Lute, Ari Lennox, JID, and EarthGang.

== Background ==
In October 2022, it was announced that composer Joseph Shirley would score Creed III. Shirley was previously part of Ludwig Göransson's team scoring the first two films in the series, as a technical score engineer and score programmer. He was also the composer of television series' The Book of Boba Fett, Fairfax, Bad Trip, and The Mysterious Benedict Society. Shirley spoke on the composition saying:

"The music for Creed III has been a complete joy to create. Working alongside Michael, as director and star in the movie, gave me an exciting perspective into what he wanted to achieve with this score. First, his overall vision for the story as a complete arc; then, a more granular and specific approach – almost as if I were on the film set with him as an actor. I decided to take a more ‘produced’ approach to the score, combining modern production techniques, brash synths, ambient saxophones, and vocal samples with the Los Angeles studio orchestra and choir, who poured themselves into this music. I wanted to build off of Ludwig Göransson’s fantastic contributions to Creed 1 and 2, by introducing new sonic and thematic material to accompany the emotional depth, tension, edginess, futuristic anime influences, and mostly tap into the heart of this movie, while staying true to the Creed legacy, of which I’m honored to now be a part."

On November 20, 2022, director and actor Michael B. Jordan announced at ComplexCon that J. Cole and Dreamville will be executive producing the original soundtrack.

== Release ==
On February 3, 2023, Dreamville released the first single "Ma Boy" with JID and Lute. On February 22, the second single "Blood, Sweat & Tears" was released with Bas and Black Sherif featuring Kel-P.

== Track listing ==
Creed III: The Soundtrack track listing
No.	Title	Writer(s)	Producer(s)	Length
1.	"Culture" (with Mez, Reason, Symba, and 8AE)	Anthony Parrino; Carl McCormick; Jason Wool; Mario Dragoi; Morris W. Ricks II; Robert Lee Gill, Jr.; Sylvian Mabe	Cardiak; Elite; Pluss; Mario Luciano	3:50
2.	"Ma Boy" (with JID and Lute)	Asheton Hogan; Benjamin Wilson; Destin Route; Feliciano Ecar Ponce; Harissis Tsakmaklis; John Welch; Jorge Miguel Cardoso Augusto; Luther Nicholson; Luzian Gregor Tuetsch; Morris W. Ricks II	Pluss; Christo; Ben10k; Bass Charity	2:46
3.	"Anthem" (with Big Sean and EST Gee)	George Stone III; Marquez Parker; Sean Michael Leonard Anderson; Taylor Hill; Thomas Brown; Tommy Parker	Mr. Parker; Taylor Hill; Tommy Brown; Tommy Parker	2:05
4.	"Adonis Interlude (The Montage)" (with J. Cole)	Jermaine Cole; Andre R. Young; Marshall Mathers; Shari Watson; Shawn Carter; William Griffin	Dr. Dre	1:35
5.	"Greater" (with Ari Lennox)	Courtney Salter; Anthony Parrino; Kelvin Wooten	Elite; Wu10	3:13
6.	"Ogogoro" (with Bas and Ayra Starr)	Abbas Hamad; Ayra Starr; Jarrett Goodly; Peter Kelvin Udoma Amba	Kel-P; Sensei Bueno	2:30
7.	"Just Face It" (performed by Blxst)	Chauncey Alexander Hollis Jr.; Dustin James Corbett; Matthew Burdette	Hit-Boy; Corbett	2:07
8.	"Headhunters" (with Westside Boogie and Cozz featuring Kevin Ross)	Anthony Dixson; Cody Osagie; David Medina; Frank "Nitty" Brim; Jarrett Goodly; Kaleb Nathan Rollins; Kevin Ross; Marc Soto	ClickNPress; Sensei Bueno; SoundWavVe (Diamond)	2:44
9.	"Jack" (with EarthGang featuring Buddy)	Eian Parker; Olu Fann; Simmie Sims III; Anthony Clemons Jr.; Asheton Hogan	Pluss	3:53
10.	"Hate Me Now" (with Arin Ray, Mereba, and Omen)	Amindi; Anthony Parrino; Antoine Harris; Arin Ray; Damon Coleman; David Medina; Jaasu Mallory; Jarrett Goodly; Margaux Whitney; Marian Mereba; Oladotun Oyebadejo Jr.; Oluwatoroti Oke	Elite; SoundWavVe (Diamond); Yuli; Jay Kurzweil Oyebadejo; Sensei Bueno; Sonic Major; Jaasu	5:12
11.	"Talk to Me" (with Omen, Ari Lennox, and OG DAYV)	Courtney Salter; Damon Coleman; Larry D. Griffin, Jr.; Maurice Nichols; Miles Franklin; Noah David Coogler	Super Miles; S1; Lonestarrmuzik	3:22
12.	"Lay Up" (with SiR featuring Syd)	Darryl Farris; Davion Farris; Sydney Bennett	LordQuest	3:28
13.	"Long the Way" (with Morray)	Caleb Anthony Shannon; Morae Ruffin; Rendull Middleton; Tahj Morgan; Tyrese McGriff	JetsonMade; Kay; Lil Tyh; PG RA	2:59
14.	"In the Room" (with JID, Tierra Whack, and BJ the Chicago Kid)	Asheton Hogan; Bryan James Sledge; Destin Route; Frank "Nitty" Brim; Thomas Brown; Tierra Whack; Tyrone Griffin, Jr.	Pluss; Tommy Brown; Ty Dolla $ign	2:52
15.	"Shadows" (with Kehlani)	Steven Franks; Thomas Brown	Tommy Brown; Mr. Franks	2:53
16.	"Burn Bridges" (with Lute, Cozz, Reason, and Arin Ray)	Alessandro Hug; Anthony Parrino; Antoine Harris; Arin Ray; Cody Osagie; Emilia Taubic; Jiovanni Romano; Joshua Morgan; Lucien Spielmann; Luther Nicholson; Robert Lee Gill Jr.	Elite; Al Hug; Emilia Anastazja; Ruck P	4:13
17.	"Heavy Is the Head" (with Baby Rose)	David Medina; Frank "Nitty" Brim; Jarrett Goodly; Jasmine Rose Wilson; Kaleb Nathan Rollins; Marc Soto; Oladotun Oyebadejo Jr.; Oluwatoroti Oke; Omar Grand	ClickNPress; SoundWavVe (Diamond); Sonic Major; Jay Kurzweil Oyebadejo; Sensei Bueno	3:02
18.	"Blood, Sweat & Tears" (with Bas and Black Sherif featuring Kel-P)	Abbas Hamad; Mohammed Ismail Sherif; Peter Kelvin Udoma Amba	Bueno; Kel-P	3:42
Total length:				53:52

Sample credits

- "Adonis Interlude (The Montage)" contains a sample of "The Watcher" as performed by Dr. Dre.

== Charts ==
Chart performance for Creed III: The Soundtrack
Chart (2023)	Peak position
US Billboard 200	127

== Score album ==
Creed III: Original Motion Picture Soundtrack

Soundtrack album by Joseph Shirley
- Released: March 3, 2023
- Genre: Film score
- Label: Sony Classical
- Producer: Joseph Shirley

Joseph Shirley chronology
The Mysterious Benedict Society (2022)	Creed III: Original Motion Picture Soundtrack (2023)

Creed III: Original Motion Picture Soundtrack is the soundtrack album for the 2023 film Creed III, composed by Joseph Shirley. It was released on March 3, 2023, through Sony Classical Records.

=== Track listing ===
No.	Title	Length
1.	"Run It Suite – Vocal Version"
2.	"Checkmate"
3.	"Diamond Dame"
4.	"Tea Party"
5.	"Adonis and Damian"
6.	"Underdog"
7.	"Damian's Plan"
8.	"Amara"
9.	"A New Contender"
10.	"Showtime Promo"
11.	"Viene por Sangre – Felix Walkout" (featuring JVZEL)
12.	"Dame v. Felix"
13.	"The Letters"
14.	"Mary Anne"
15.	"Stop Running"
16.	"Training Montage" (featuring Baby Rose)
17.	"The Void" (with Maiya Sykes)
18.	"Round 12"
19.	"The Champ"
