= Vacancy (Ari Lennox album) =

Studio album by Ari Lennox
- Released: January 23, 2026
- Genres: R&B; soul
- Length: 50:51
- Label: Interscope
- Producers: BongoByTheWay; Bonxu; BoogzDaBeast; Camper; Cardiak; Bryan-Michael Cox; Di Genius; Jermaine Dupri; Elite; David Emmanuel; Ron Gilmore; Al Hug; Eric Hudson; J. White Did It; Dave James; Jerkpop; Kosine; Leather Jacket; Napes; Tommy Parker; Ben Parris; Ruck P; TBHits; Tricky Stewart; Supa Dups; Swiff D; Wu10

Ari Lennox chronology
Age/Sex/Location (2022)	Vacancy (2026)

Singles from Vacancy
- 1. "Soft Girl Era" Released: March 26, 2025; 2. "Vacancy" Released: September 26, 2025; 3. "Under the Moon" Released: October 23, 2025; 4. "Twin Flame" Released: January 9, 2026

Vacancy is the third studio album by the American singer Ari Lennox. It was released on January 23, 2026, by Interscope Records.

== Background and promotion ==
In August 2022, Lennox released her second album Age/Sex/Location through rapper J. Cole's Dreamville Records and Interscope. The album was well received by critics, who highlighted its thoughtful songwriting, classic soul and jazz nods, strong features, and comparisons to artists like Erykah Badu, Lauryn Hill, and Roberta Flack. It opened and peaked at number 69 on the US Billboard 200 and reached the top 20 of the UK Hip Hop and R&B Albums Chart, and produced the two number-one hits on the US Adult R&B Songs chart, including "Pressure" and "Waste My Time." On 24 April 2025, Lennox officially parted ways with Dreamville after months of conflict, remaining signed to Interscope Records, having repeatedly voiced public frustration over the label's failure to promote her work as she envisioned, particularly citing the lack of promotion for her 2024 single "Smoke."

Lennox released the single "Soft Girl Era" on March 26, 2025, her first single after leaving Dreamville. She released the single "Vacancy" on September 26, 2025. Lennox announced the album and released the album's third single "Under the Moon" in October 2025. "Twin Flame" was released as a single on January 9, 2026. On July 31, 2026, Lennox released "Hookah Baby" as a single for the album's deluxe edition, titled Vacancy: The Late Checkout.

== Critical reception ==
Professional ratings
Aggregate scores
Source	Rating
Metacritic	75/100
Review scores
Source	Rating
AllMusic	4/5 stars
The Guardian	3/5 stars
NME	4/5 stars
Pichfork	7.1/10
Slant Magazine	3.5/5 stars

Vacancy was met with "generally favorable" reviews from critics. At Metacritic, which assigns a weighted average rating out of 100 to reviews from mainstream publications, this release received an average score of 75, based on 5 reviews.

AllMusic editor Andy Kellman remarked that "all of the standouts are both of a piece with Lennox's catalog and distinctive. The same goes for the material that isn't entirely loved up [...] The more pop-flavored moments, none of which seem like concessions, are best when they have a hint of prime Mariah Carey. Tallie Spencer from HotNewHipHop remarked that the "project spans 15 tracks and consists of a sultry, mood-rich collection that blends soul, R&B, and late-night introspection. With rich vocals and warm production, [Lennox] builds on her reputation for blending personal storytelling with lush arrangements, giving listeners a body of work that feels both intimate and expansive. Vacancy continues her evolution as one of contemporary R&B’s most expressive voices."

Writing for NME, Oumar Saleh called the album Lennox' "most inviting record to date," adding that "the album’s pleasures are tactile and immediate, the kind of R&B built for dim lights and late-night texts. If the genre is perpetually caught between nostalgia and novelty, then Vacancy thrives by living in the present." Vrinda Jagota from Pitchfork found that Vacancy was "rooted in experience and features the most skillful vocal performances of Lennox’s career, highlighting her attention to mood and the patience with which she builds toward runs that feel like falling in love. Still, sometimes the songs feel like they’re trapped in amber, with emotion muted and songwriting that verges on repetitive." Writing for The Guardian, Shaad D'Souza called Vacancy Lennox' "loosest and most fun outing yet." He felt that "on her third LP, Lennox balances jazz-soaked tradition with flashes of unruly humour and a surefire viral hit [...] The sheer ease with which she performs on Vacancy suggests there’s plenty of road ahead."

== Commercial performance ==
Vacancy debuted at number 172 on the US Billboard 200 and number 25 on Billboard's Top R&B Albums chart. It marked Lennnox' first album to miss the upper half of the Billboard 200.

== Track listing ==
Vacancy track listing
No.	Title	Writer(s)	Producer(s)	Length
1.	"Mobbin in DC"	Courtney Salter; Anthony Parrino; Theodor Croker; Preston Crump; Napon Pintong; David Emmanuel	Emmanuel; Elite; Napes	4:25
2.	"Vacancy"	Salter; Jermaine Dupri; Bryan-Michael Cox; Antoine Harris; James Mtume; Tawatha Agee; Reggie Lucas; Jahmal Gwin	Dupri; Cox; BoogzDaBeast	3:03
3.	"Pretzel"	Salter; Kelvin Wooten; Carl McCormick; Steve Thornton II	Wu10; Cardiak; Swiff D	3:23
4.	"Under the Moon"	Salter; Parrino; Ron Gilmore; David James Miller; Thomas Lumpkins	Elite; Gilmore; David James; Tommy Parker; Pierre Medor^{[a]}	3:26
5.	"High Key"	Salter; Anthony Jermaine White; Akil King; Verse Simmonds; Bianca Atterberry; Etterlene Jordan; Robert DeBarge	J. White Did It	2:12
6.	"Twin Flame"	Salter; Thomas Lee Brown; Marqueze Parker; Alivia Trinity Parker	Leather Jacket; TBHits	3:06
7.	"Soft Girl Era"	Salter; Dupri; Cox; Anthony Clemons; Gabrielle Rodgers	Dupri; Cox	3:06
8.	"Deep Strokes"	Salter; Eric Hudson; Wooten; Derrick "D-Nice" Jones; Aziza Murphy; McCormick	Hudson; Wu10; Cardiak	2:52
9.	"24 Seconds"	Salter; Christopher A. Stewart; Dream Sarae Lumpkin; Rafael Dewayne Ishman	Dream Sarae; Tricky Stewart	2:47
10.	"Cool Down"	Salter; Stewart; Ben Parris; Jens Christian Isaksen; Camara Alford; Lokre	Stewart; Parris; JerkPop	3:05
11.	"Horoscope"	Salter; Parrino; Clemons; Jocelyn Donald; Alessandro Hug; Lucien Spielmann; Marco Summers	Al Hug; Ruck P	4:27
12.	"Wake Up"	Salter; Uforo Ebong; Ernest Osei-Bonsu; Marcos Palacios	BongoByTheWay; Bonxu; Kosine	3:30
13.	"Company" (with Buju Banton)	Salter; Mark Myrie; Dwayne Chin-Quee; Stephen McGregor; David Bowden; Gamal Lewis	Supa Dups; Di Genius	3:06
14.	"Dreaming"	Salter; Parrino; Gilmore; James; T. Lumpkins; Miller	Elite; Gilmore; Dave James; T. Parker	4:44
15.	"Hocus Pocus"	Salter; Darhyl Camper Jr.; Nathan Ferraro	Camper; Elite	3:32
Total length:				50:51

Vacancy: Late Checkout (deluxe) track listing (Denoted as "Disc 2")
No.	Title	Writer(s)	Producer(s)	Length
16.	"Hookah Baby"	Salter; Brown; A. Parker	Leather Jacket; TBHits	2:56
17.	"Show Me"	Salter; Jessie Reyez; J. Hart	BongoByTheWay; Bonxu; Bryan Abreu	3:26
18.	"Slide" (featuring Foggieraw)	Salter	Jay Versace	2:42
19.	"Mobbin In DC (Remix)"	Salter; Parrino; Croker; Crump; Pintong; Emmanuel	Emmanuel; Elite; Napes	4:25
20.	"Speak Your Mind"	Salter; Amy Allen	BongoByTheWay; Medor^{[a]}	2:49
21.	"Leave Me Alone"	Salter; Rodgers; Rexton Gordon; Greville Gordon; Wycliffe Johnson; Cleveland Browney	BongoByTheWay	2:35
22.	"Unicorn"	Salter	Sol Was	2:29
23.	"Hot Mess"	Salter; Emelie Walcott	PRGRSHN; J. Moon; Medor^{[a]}	4:06

=== Note ===
- ^{^[a]} signifies a vocal producer.

== Personnel ==
Credits adapted from Tidal.

=== Musicians ===
- Ari Lennox – vocals
- Kosine – saxophone (tracks 2, 12)
- Bryan-Michael Cox – bass, keyboards (2)
- Jermaine Dupri – drums, percussion (2)
- Wu10 – bass, guitar (3, 8)
- Cardiak – drums (3, 8), percussion (8)
- Tommy Parker – background vocals (4), vocal programming (5)
- Ron Gilmore – keyboards (4, 14), guitar (14)
- Dave James – guitar (4), percussion (14)
- J. White Did It – keyboards, programming (5)
- Alivia Blue – background vocals (6)
- Leather Jacket – programming (6)
- TBHits – programming (6)
- Eric Hudson – bass, piano (8)
- Tricky Stewart – programming (9, 10), keyboards (9)
- Richard Ledesma – vocal programming (9, 10)
- Ben Parris – keyboards, programming (10)
- Dream Sarae – keyboards, programing (9)
- Camara Alford – programming (10)
- Jens Christian Isaksen – programming (10)
- Pierre Medor – background vocals (11, 14), vocal programming (14, 15)
- Preston Crump – bass (11)
- Ruck P – bass (11)
- Al Hug – keyboards, percussion (11)
- BongoByTheWay – background vocals, bass, drums, guitar, keyboards, percussion (12)
- Bonxu – background vocals, bass, drums, guitar, keyboards, percussion (12)
- Di Genius – bass, guitar, keyboards (13)
- Supa Dups – drums, percussion (13)
- Buju Banton – vocals (13)
- Elite – bass (14)
- Theo Croker – trumpet (14)
- Camper – bass, drums, keyboards (15)

=== Technical ===
- Timon Adams – engineering (1, 3, 11), engineering assistance (4, 5, 12, 14, 15)
- Dru Castro – engineering (2)
- John Horesco IV – engineering (2)
- Randy "Urbo" Urbanski – engineering (4, 7, 12, 14, 15)
- Steezy – engineering (5)
- John Scott Sanford – engineering (6)
- Alan Floyd – engineering (7)
- Phil Lewis – engineering (8)
- Richard Ledesma – engineering (9, 10)
- Denzel "Heartbreak" Richards – engineering (13)
- Noe Corona – engineering (15)
- Ben Plachy – engineering assistance (7, 15)
- Ellie Havenstrite – engineering assistance (7, 15)
- Ryan Lauer – engineering assistance (7, 15)
- Laila Williams – engineering assistance (9, 10)
- Manny Marroquin – mixing (1–6, 8–15)
- Jaycen Joshua – mixing, mastering (7)
- Mike Seaberg – mixing (7)
- Chris Bhikoo – additional mixing (7)
- Jacob Richards – additional mixing (7)
- Zach Pereyra – mastering (1–6, 8–15)

== Charts ==
Chart performance for Vacancy
Chart (2026)	Peak position
US Billboard 200	172
US Top R&B Albums (Billboard)	25
