= Jai'Len Josey =

American singer and songwriter

Jai'Len Josey is an American singer, songwriter, actress, producer, and influencer. She made her Broadway debut as Pearl Krabs in Spongebob Squarepants, The Musical, in 2017. She returned to the stage in the title role of Cinderella in Rodgers and Hammerstein's Cinderella at True Colors Theatre in Atlanta, Georgia, during select dates from June to July 2026. She was signed to Hillman Grad Records, the label founded by Lena Waithe, but signed to DefJam Records in March 2026. Josey released her debut EP, Illustrations in 2020, followed by her sophomore EP, Southern Delicacy in 2023. Her debut album, Serial Romantic was released in April 2026. She cites Stevie Wonder as an influence. As well as artists like Duke Ellington, Nina Simone, and Victoria Monét who inspired her to write “lyrics with intention.” Josey was named Rock the Bells x M&M's Artists on The Rise in 2022.

== Early life and education ==
Josey grew up in Atlanta, and went to Tri Cities High School in Fulton County.

In 2014, Josey won a Jimmy Award also known as the National High School Musical Theater Awards for Best Performance by an Actress representing the Georgia High School Musical Theater Awards.

== Career ==
In 2017, Josey was cast as Pearl Krabs in Spongebob Squarepants, The Musical.

Josey was co-writer on Ari Lennox's single, "Pressure" from Lennox's age/sex/location, which made Billboard's Adult R&B chart and was certified gold by RIAA, as well as "Stop By" and "Gummy." In 2022, Josey and Alex Vaughn opened for Ari Lennox on Lennox's age/sex/location tour. Josey's additional writing credits and vocal appearances include SZA, Babyface, Rod Wave, and Wyclef Jean.

In 2025, Josey announced her upcoming debut album, Serial Romantic, executive produced by Tricky Stewart. The album's first single, "New Girl," was released on April 4th, 2025, followed by "Freak" on August 29th, 2025, "Won't Force You" on October 31st, 2025, and "Housewife" on February 20th, 2026. The album was released in its entirety on April 24th, 2026 via DefJam Records.
