= Revenge of the Dreamers =

Compilation album by Dreamville Records
- Released: January 28, 2014
- Recorded: 2013
- Genres: Hip hop; R&B
- Length: 39:14
- Label: Dreamville
- Producers: Jermaine Cole; Omen; Cedric Brown; Ron Gilmore; K-Quick; Jay Kurzweil

Dreamville Records chronology
Revenge of the Dreamers (2014)	Revenge of the Dreamers II (2015)

Revenge of the Dreamers is the first compilation album by American record label Dreamville Records and was released on January 28, 2014. The album includes contributions by Dreamville artists, J. Cole, Bas, Omen, K-Quick as well as Treasure Davis. Producers on this album include, J. Cole, Omen, Ron Gilmore, Cedric Brown, K-Quick, and Jay Kurzweil. The project is the first in the series and spawned two sequels: Revenge of the Dreamers II (2015) and Revenge of the Dreamers III (2019).

== Background ==
On January 28, 2014, at a show at the Theater at Madison Square Garden, Cole announced that his Dreamville imprint had signed a distribution deal with Interscope Records, which celebrated his 29th birthday. Attendees at the show received a flyer announcing the deal and a copy of the mixtape, while officially announcing the signing of Bas. J. Cole explained the deal with Billboard saying:

"The deal's been official since late December, and we'd been working on it for a while before that, but it felt too important to just go out and yell it right when it happened. It needed a more grand announcement." Cole explained that talks with Interscope began when Joie Manda, Interscope president of urban music, reached out to him in 2013. I thought he wanted me to produce someone over there and I was excited about that, but then he told me that he really believed in me as an executive, a label CEO and a producer. A Dr. Dre to his Jimmy Iovine. He had the vision."

The tracks "Golden Goals" and "Lit" are featured on the album Last Winter (2015), and the track "Motion Picture" is featured on the album Elephant Eyes.

== Critical reception ==
The average rating of the mixtape from editors at HotNewHipHop was a 76%, and said "With the launch of Dreamville, it’s clear that J. Cole is about to step things up career-wise, and this mixtape serves as a great introduction to the crew. While we've heard from Bas, Omen and the others before, it was more in passing we didn't always pay them much attention. This tape does a good job at shining some light on them, while Cole plays a supportive role." Jake Rohn from BET praised the label saying "the North Carolina-born MC is looking to pass on some of that shine to a few up-and-coming artists of his own with a new label home at Interscope for his Dreamville Records and the imprint's major label debut mixtape, Revenge of the Dreamers." He continued to say "Like Jermaine himself, his artists seem to understand the need to create a good song in addition to being apt lyrically. While it's still too early to tell who's got real star power, Cole just might wind up bequeathing that Roc chain to one of his artists someday."

== Track listing ==
No.	Title	Writer(s)	Producer(s)	Length
1.	"Lil’ Niggaz" (J. Cole)	Jermaine Cole	J. Cole	0:51
2.	"Golden Goals" (Bas)	Abbas Hamad	Jay Kurzweil	2:34
3.	"Motion Picture" (Omen)	Damon Colemen	Omen	3:54
4.	"Lit" (Bas featuring J. Cole and K-Quick)	Hamad, Cole	Cedric Brown, Ron Gilmore	4:38
5.	"Revenge of the Dreamers" (J. Cole)	Cole	Cole	3:54
6.	"Ceelo With the G’s" (Bas)	Hamad	Cedric Brown	3:37
7.	"Henny Flow" (Omen)	Coleman	Omen	3:12
8.	"Blowin Smoke" (J. Cole)	Cole	Flying Lotus	3:20
9.	"Bitchez" (J. Cole featuring Bas and Omen)	Cole, Hamad, Coleman	K-Quick	5:38
10.	"May The Bitter Man Win" (Treasure Davis featuring J. Cole)	Cole	Cole	4:08
11.	"Crooked Smile (Original)" (J. Cole)	Cole	Cole	4:28
