= Away Message =

EP by Ari Lennox
- Released: August 31, 2022
- Recorded: 2020–2022
- Genres: R&B; soul
- Length: 14:14
- Labels: Dreamville; Interscope
- Producers: Dallas Austin; Darko; Deputy; Dre Pinckney; DZL; Elite; OG Parker; Platinum Libraries; Romano; Ron Gilmore; Str8cash

Ari Lennox chronology
Shea Butter Baby (Remix EP) (2020)	Away Message (2022)	Age/Sex/Location (2022)

Away Message is the third extended play by American singer Ari Lennox. It was released on August 31, 2022, by Dreamville and Interscope Records. The EP includes production from Elite, Dallas Austin, OG Parker, Deputy, DZL, and Ron Gilmore, among others.

== Background ==
On August 31, Lennonx released "Queen Space" featuring Summer Walker as a promotional single for her second album Age/Sex/Location. Later that day, she released this 5-track EP Away Message as a surprise, which includes songs that were recorded for the album but did not make the final cut.

== Critical reception ==
Craig Jenkins of Vulture said "Lennox set the tone for the new album with Away Message, a short EP released in late August. The jazzy deep cut "No Settling" makes the most of a dire situation — 'I have options, but they garbage, so I'd rather be free'—in the same way the album takes stock of the men in the singer's orbit and frequently opts out of any further engagement." SoulBounce wrote about the EP breaking down the songs saying "Queen Space" "sets the bar high for the rest of the EP. Ari and Summer have already shown their chemistry on "Unloyal". "Tatted" and "Gummy" "sound straight outta the '90s R&B archives yet fresh and new. [...] On "No Settling" as she realizes that she needs more than she's being offered. She even goes so far to spell it out to anyone who doesn't understand her plight. That discontent carries over into "Bitter."

== Track listing ==
Away Message track listing
No.	Title	Writer(s)	Producer(s)	Length
1.	"Queen Space" (with Summer Walker)	Salter; Summer Walker; André Pinckney; Anthony Parrino; Elliott Trent; Ronald Gilmore; Storm Ford	Dre Pickney; Elite; Ron Gilmore	3:50
2.	"Tatted"	Salter; Dallas Austin; Terrence Williams; Joshua Parker; John Homen; Oscar Leo-Christensen	OG Parker; Romano; Dallas Austin; Platinum Libraries	2:57
3.	"Gummy"	Salter; Anthony Parrino; Jai'Len Josey	Elite; Deputy	2:22
4.	"No Settling"	Salter; Michael Holmes; Julius Noah Maria Herold; Breahna Morgan; Isak Gidgard	DZL; Str8cash; Darko	2:10
5.	"Bitter"	Salter; Parrino; Arrow Brown	Elite	2:55
Total length:				14:14
