= Who Dat (J. Cole song) =

Single by J. Cole
- Released: May 31, 2010
- Genre: Hip hop
- Length: 3:58
- Label: Roc Nation; Columbia
- Songwriters: Jermaine Cole; Anthony Parrino; André Benjamin; Antwan Patton; Patrick Brown
- Producers: J. Cole; Elite

J. Cole singles chronology
"All I Want Is You" (2010)	"Who Dat" (2010)	"A Star Is Born" (2010)

"Who Dat" is a song by the American hip hop recording artist J. Cole. It was released as a single in the United States on May 31, 2010. Despite initially being meant to be the lead single from Cole's first album Cole World: The Sideline Story (2011), "Who Dat" was ultimately cut from the album's standard track listing after underperforming on the charts. It does, however, appear as a bonus track on the iTunes edition of the album.

== Background and composition ==
Produced by J. Cole and Elite, "Who Dat" contains samples of "Godofallofus" as performed by New Hope and a line from "SpottieOttieDopalicious" by Outkast, in which André 3000 raps "Now who else wanna fuck with Hollywood Cole?". Explaining why he chose "Who Dat" to be his first single, Cole said, "It's really about the beat and the raps and not much more. It's an introduction to those that were unfamiliar and also something for my fans to brag about as opposed to hearing it on the radio and being like 'Ehhh.'" He also described the song as "raw" and stated that it reminded him of his older sound. While the song does not appear as a standard track on his first studio album Cole World: The Sideline Story (2011), Cole kept the song as a bonus track because "[it] connects the past two years to everything."

== Music video ==
The music video for "Who Dat" was directed by BBGun – a duo composed of Maxim Bohichik and Alex Bergman – and shot in J. Cole's hometown of Fayetteville, North Carolina, during the final week of May 2010. The video is one continuous shot of Cole walking, surrounded by local college cheerleaders from Fayetteville State University and the E. E. Smith High School high school marching band. Fayetteville State University took objection to the song's profane and sexually explicit lyrics and attempted to have the video removed from the Internet and major music networks. School superintendent Frank Till Jr. stated: "I think it shows the school and the city in a negative light. I think it was a legitimate mistake on the school's part. We don't allow that kind of language in our school. Why would we allow our students to do something like this?"

== Who Datt Pt. 2 ==
On September 7, 2011, a remix was released titled "Who Datt Pt. 2" featuring Spencer Datt (SD) and Childish Gambino. The song appears on the Hot 97 radio personality Peter Rosenberg's mixtape What's Poppin' Volume One. Rosenberg revealed on his website that Spencer Datt, an aspiring rapper, was his brother-in-law who had died in a car crash, a month after he proposed to his sister. Rosenberg put the remix together in his honor and persuaded two of Datt's favorite rappers J. Cole and Donald Glover a.k.a. Childish Gambino to record new verses for him.

== Chart performance ==
Chart (2010)	Peak position
US Billboard Hot 100	93
US Hot R&B/Hip-Hop Songs (Billboard)	32
US Hot Rap Songs (Billboard)	19

== Release history ==
Country	Date	Format	Label	Ref.
United States	May 31, 2010	Urban contemporary radio	Roc Nation; Columbia	
United States	June 8, 2010	Digital download	Roc Nation; Columbia	
