= Friday Night Lights (mixtape) =

Third mixtape by J. Cole

Mixtape by J. Cole
- Released: November 12, 2010
- Genre: Hip hop
- Length: 77:41
- Labels: Dreamville; Roc Nation; Columbia
- Producers: Bink!; Bryan-Michael Cox; Carmelo Famouss; Elite; J. Cole; Kanye West; L&X Music; Mario Winans; Omen; Syience; Timbaland

J. Cole chronology
The Warm Up (2009)	Friday Night Lights (2010)	Cole World: The Sideline Story (2011)

Friday Night Lights is the third official mixtape from American rapper J. Cole. It was released on November 12, 2010. The mixtape was to originally be called Villematic and contain J. Cole's previous leaks and freestyles, however, Cole later stated it would have original material. The mixtape became the second most searched and trending topics on Google and Twitter respectively following its release. Most songs on the mixtape were slated to be on his debut album at one point or another. The mixtape has been viewed over 4,470,000 times, streamed over 1,280,000 times, and downloaded over 1,700,000 times on mixtape site DatPiff.

On June 26, 2013, Cole announced that he would be re-releasing The Warm Up and Friday Night Lights for retail sale, in order to "give them the push they deserved".

The mixtape was eventually re-released onto streaming platforms on November 27, 2024, accompanying the fifth episode release of Cole's audio podcast series Inevitable, which focused on this mixtape. The streaming release omits the bonus track "Looking for Trouble".

== Background ==
The original tracks on the mixtape were intended to be on Cole's debut album Cole World: The Sideline Story. However, because the label did not believe it would sell, Cole released the original songs with extra freestyles as a mixtape, but was forced to redo the entire album. "In The Morning" featuring Drake, was the only record from the mixtape to make the album cut.

== Recording and production ==
"Villematic"
A 30 second sample of "Villematic" which samples "Devil in a New Dress" by Kanye West.

Producers who contributed to the tape are J. Cole himself, Bink, Kanye West, L&X Music, Syience, & long-time friends Elite and Omen.

The bonus track on the mixtape, "Looking For Trouble" was released for free on November 7, 2010, by Kanye West as part of his series G.O.O.D. Fridays where he released a song every Friday for multiple months until Christmas of 2010. In an interview with Complex magazine in November 2010, Cole talked about how the song came about saying:

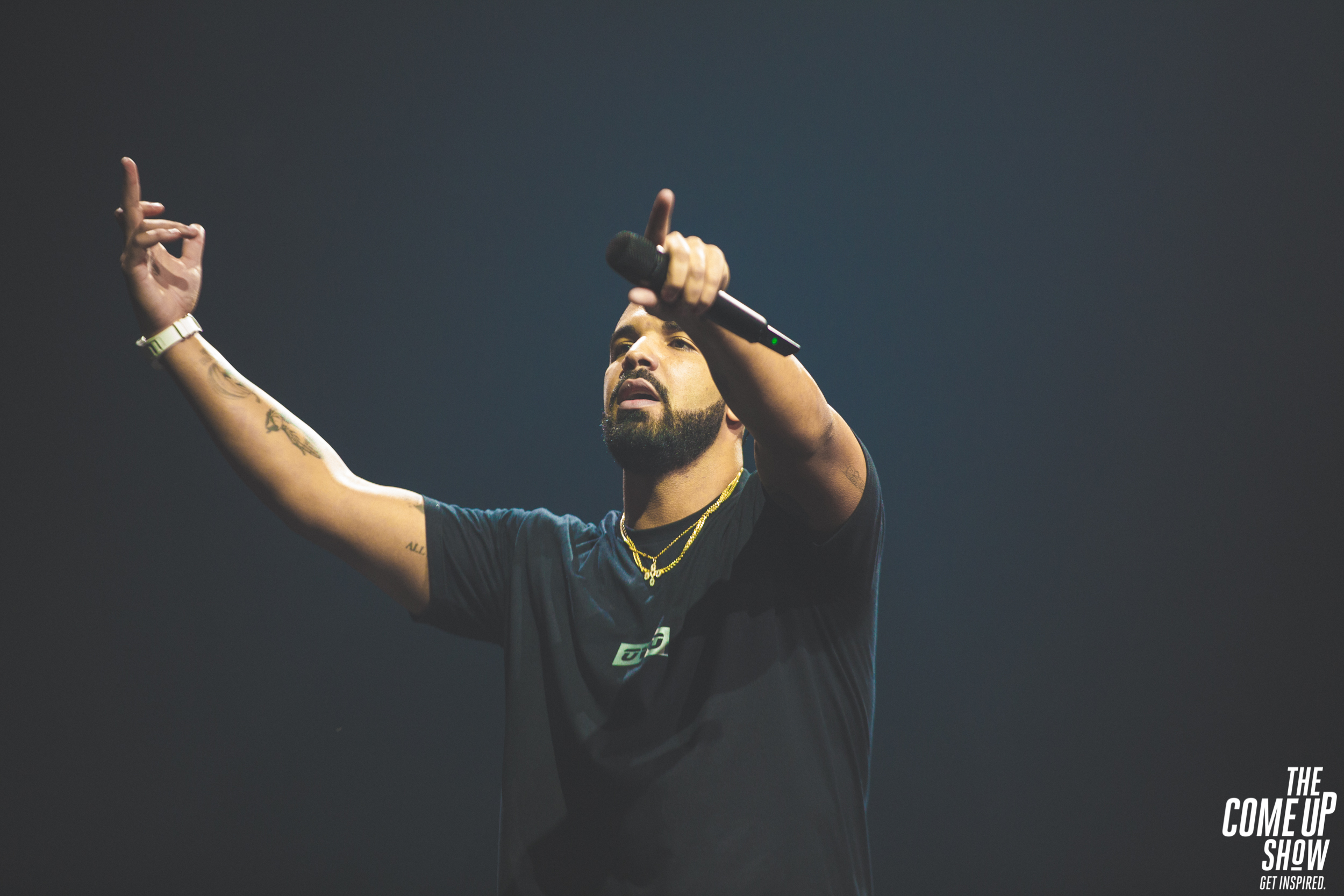
Rapper Drake was featured on the track "In the Morning"

[That verse] was last minute. I got the beat the night before from my manager. But nobody told me they wanted to do it for G.O.O.D. Friday, and definitely not that G.O.O.D. Friday. I was like, ‘Oh man, that beat is dope. I’ll write to it soon.’ The next day I woke up in Kalamazoo, Michigan—I was on tour—and I was getting ready to go to Detroit because I had a radio promo event to do. So I got a call from Kanye and he was like, ‘What’s up? It’s Kanye. Can you get that verse today? I’m tryna put the song out tonight.’ I honestly didn’t think I could do it in time so I told him that. He said, ‘I’ll wait. We got engineers up all night so you got a while to do it. But if you can, have it done by today.’ I said, ‘I’ll make it happen somehow.’ “I wrote my verse on the hour-and-a-half ride to Detroit, did the radio promos, left that, went directly to the studio, laid the verse, and sent it to him by 5 o’clock. Mind you, I didn’t hear anybody else’s verses or the song itself, I just heard the beat and did my verse. I drove back to Kalamazoo and did the show. When I got offstage, he had just put the song out, and I sat back and watched all the comments as people went crazy. It was a beautiful night.

A video for "In the Morning" was shot during a concert in Paris. J. Cole and Drake performed the song live on many occasions, such as Drake's Lights Dreams and Nightmares Tour. Cole said “It was my first time in Paris, and I got a text from Drake. And it was him just telling me he heard "In the Morning" for the first time. My real fans will know that it's an older song,” Cole tells Vibe. “He said it was incredible, and I’ve always wanted to bring that record back to life because the original version I recorded in my bedroom—in my old crib, in my small room.” Feeling the time was right for two of rap's most talked about rookies to team up, Cole calmly told Drake that he wanted to revamp the record.

== Critical reception ==
Professional ratings
Review scores
Source	Rating
AllHipHop	10/10
MSN Music (Expert Witness)	(3-star Honorable Mention)
Pitchfork	7.3/10

Friday Night Lights received widespread acclaim from critics. AllHipHop gave the mixtape a rare classic rating of 10/10 saying, "Friday Night Lights is a mixtape with very few blemishes and faults. Cole nicely knits together a very interesting precursor to his upcoming album Cole World and it holds its own as one of the most complete mixtapes of the year. Is he “The One”? Well we do not know that yet – but Friday Night Lights definitely has us paying attention." In the same vein, Lost In The Sound gave the mixtape 88/100 saying, "Friday Night Lights is a great effort from Cole all around, showcasing both his lyrical and production talents, but still addressing all of the emotional issues that have become the ‘bread-and-butter’ of Cole's musical repertoire." Robert Christgau, writing for MSN Music, gave the mixtape a three-star honorable mention, indicating "an enjoyable effort consumers attuned to its overriding aesthetic or individual vision may well treasure." He felt that there are several good songs, but few "irresistible ones", and cited both "Blow Up" and "Farewell" as highlights.

Friday Night Lights won Best Mixtape of the Year at the 2011 BET Hip Hop Awards.

== Track listing ==
All tracks are written and produced by J. Cole, except where listed.

No.	Title	Writer(s)	Producer(s)	Length
1.	"Friday Night Lights (Intro)"			1:45
2.	"Too Deep for the Intro"			3:45
3.	"Before I'm Gone"			4:24
4.	"Back to the Topic (Freestyle)"	Cole; Mario Winans; Leroy Watson; Aion Clarke; Michael Jones	Winans; Carmelo Famouss; Bryan-Michael Cox	3:00
5.	"You Got It" (featuring Wale)	Cole; Olubowale Akintimehin; Janelle Robinson; Charles Joseph II; Nathaniel Irvin III; Lorenz Hart; Richard Rodgers		4:47
6.	"Villematic"		Bink	3:13
7.	"Enchanted" (with Omen)	Cole; Damon Coleman	Cole; Omen	4:11
8.	"Blow Up"			5:00
9.	"Higher"			3:49
10.	"In the Morning" (featuring Drake)	Cole; Aubrey Graham	L&X Music	3:54
11.	"2Face"		Syience	4:46
12.	"The Autograph"			3:43
13.	"Best Friend"	Cole; Timothy Mosley; Missy Elliott	Timbaland	3:25
14.	"Cost Me a Lot"			3:18
15.	"Premeditated Murder"			3:54
16.	"Home for the Holidays"			3:55
17.	"Love Me Not"			3:31
18.	"See World"		Elite; Cole	4:14
19.	"Farewell"			3:32
20.	"Looking for Trouble" (performed by Kanye West featuring Pusha T, J. Cole, CyHi, and Big Sean) (bonus track)	Cole; Kanye West; Terrence Thornton; Cydel Young; Sean Anderson	West	5:35
Total length:				77:41

Notes

- "Home for the Holidays" features additional background vocals by Beyoncé.

Sample credits

- "Too Deep for the Intro" samples "Didn't Cha Know" by Erykah Badu.
- "Back to the Topic" samples "Must be Love" by Cassie.
- "You Got It" samples "Neon Valley Street" by Janelle Monáe, and an interpolation of "Hypnotize" by Notorious B.I.G.
- "Villematic" samples "Devil in a New Dress" by Kanye West featuring Rick Ross.
- "Enchanted" interpolates "Hail Mary" by 2Pac.
- "Blow Up" samples "Hocus Pocus" by Focus
- "In the Morning" interpolates "Can I Get A" by Jay-Z
- "The Autograph" samples "Julie" by The Class-Set.
- "Best Friend" samples "Best Friends" by Missy Elliott featuring Aaliyah.
- "Cost Me a Lot" samples "My Man" by Billie Holiday, and an interpolation of "Don't Take It Personal (Just One of Dem Days)" by Monica.
- "Premeditated Murder" samples "That Sweet Woman of Mine" by Leon Haywood
- "Home for the Holidays" samples "Doc" by Chocolate Milk & interpolates "Wanksta" by 50 Cent and "Holla at Me" by 2Pac
- "Love Me Not" samples "My Cherie Amour" by Stevie Wonder.
- "See World" samples "Living Inside Your Love" by Earl Klugh, and "Pain" by 2Pac.
- "Farewell" samples "So Fresh, So Clean" by OutKast.
- "Looking For Trouble" samples "Blue Dance Raid" by Steel Pulse, and "Bubble Music" by Cam'ron.

== Charts ==
Chart performance for Friday Night Lights
Chart (2024)	Peak position
Nigerian Albums (TurnTable)	85
US Billboard 200	147
