= Shea Butter Baby (song) =

Single by Ari Lennox and J. Cole

from the album Shea Butter Baby and Creed II: The Album
- Released: February 26, 2019
- Recorded: 2018
- Genre: R&B
- Length: 3:31
- Label: Dreamville; Interscope
- Songwriters: Courtney Shenade Salter; Jermaine Cole; Anthony Parrino; Tim Schoegje
- Producers: Elite; Shroom

Ari Lennox singles chronology
"Whipped Cream" (2018)	"Shea Butter Baby" (2019)	"Up Late" (2019)

J. Cole singles chronology
"Middle Child" (2019)	"Shea Butter Baby" (2019)	"Purple Emoji" (2019)

Music video
- Ari Lennox, J. Cole - Shea Butter Baby on YouTube

"Shea Butter Baby" is a song by American singer Ari Lennox and American rapper J. Cole. The song was produced by Elite and Shroom, and was originally released on November 16, 2018, on the soundtrack for the sports drama film Creed II, titled Creed II: The Album. It was later released as a single on February 26, 2019, for Ari Lennox's album Shea Butter Baby.

== Background ==
The song made an appearance in the film Creed II, as Ari Lennox spoke to Billboard during her Creed II red carpet interview on what inspired her to create the song and cited her influences saying:

This is such an honor. It’s one of the biggest things that’s ever happened to me, Creed is such a real, amazing and phenomenal franchise, so this is insane. It came out of nowhere. I had the song written for a while, the label submitted it and the director just happened to love it. I feel lucky as hell. Elite was doing what he does, producing, and it sounded beautiful. I was just going for Missy Elliott mixed with Raphael Saadiq vibes, and it all worked out and Cole hopped on it about a month ago and changed my life again. It sounds great and he absolutely killed it.

== Recording and composition ==
In an interview with Billboard, Elite talked about how the song was created saying, "We were at my place in L.A. and making a bunch of songs. It happened really quickly. I made the beat really fast. She came up with the song really fast. We recorded it. We looked at it like just another [song], and we sent it around to our team." A few months later, they revisited the track to find what songs will make the album, and Cole immediately wanted to get on the song.

== Music video ==
The lyric video for the song was released on November 18, 2018, with selections of multiple different scenes from Creed II. The official music video was released on February 20, 2019, and was directed by Bennett Johnson, which surpassed 3 million views via YouTube within the first week. The video depicts the ups and downs of a relationship between Ari and her partner. Cole also appears around the halfway mark of the video as he spits his verse while standing in a vacant space with Lennox.

== Credits and personnel ==
Credits and personnel adapted from Tidal and Spotify.

- Courtney Shenade Salter – main artist, composer, lyricist
- Jermaine Cole – main artist, composer, lyricist
- Anthony Parrino – composer, lyricist
- Tim Schoegje – composer, lyricist
- Elite – producer
- Shroom – additional producer

== Charts ==
Chart (2019)	Peak position
US Adult R&B Songs (Billboard)	26
US R&B/Hip-Hop Airplay (Billboard)	44

== Certifications ==
Region	Certification	Certified units/sales
Brazil (Pro-Música Brasil)	Gold	20,000^{‡}
Canada (Music Canada)	Gold	40,000^{‡}
New Zealand (RMNZ)	Gold	15,000^{‡}
United Kingdom (BPI)	Silver	200,000^{‡}
United States (RIAA)	Platinum	1,000,000^{‡}
^{‡} Sales+streaming figures based on certification alone.

== Release history ==
Region	Date	Format	Label	Ref.
Various	February 26, 2019	Digital download	Dreamville; Interscope	
