= Pho (EP) =

EP by Ari Lennox
- Released: October 21, 2016
- Recorded: 2015–16
- Genres: R&B; neo soul
- Length: 22:21
- Labels: Dreamville; Interscope
- Producers: J. Cole (exec.); Ibrahim Hamad (exec.); DJ Grumble; Felly; Hollywood JB; Dave James

Ari Lennox chronology
Ariography (2013)	Pho (2016)	Shea Butter Baby (2019)

Singles from Pho
- 1. "Backseat" Released: October 14, 2016

Pho is the debut extended play by American singer Ari Lennox. It was released on October 21, 2016, by Dreamville Records and Interscope Records.

== Background ==
The EP was mainly produced by DJ Grumble, with additional production from Felly, Hollywood JB, and Dave James. The only guest appearance in this EP was from Dreamville label-mate, Cozz, on the song "Backseat".

== Singles and promotion ==
On December 8, 2015, "Backseat" was originally released on the collaborative effort, Revenge of the Dreamers II, as promotion for Ari Lennox's debut release. The music video for "Backseat" was released on October 14, 2016. The music video for "GOAT" was uploaded to Ari's Vevo on YouTube on November 13, 2017.

== Critical reception ==
Stereo Champions gave the extended play a 9 out of 10 saying "Overall, this is a great EP, definitely one I’ll hold on to forever as it’s definitely some of her best work. I’m sure this year will also yield big results for Ms. Lennox as she’s just getting started. Hopefully, if she’s reading this she knows we appreciate her music and Washington, DC is watching and cheering her on all the way to the top."

== Track listing ==
No.	Title	Writer(s)	Producer(s)	Length
1.	"Yuengling"	Courtney Salter; C. Felner	Felly	2:43
2.	"Backseat" (featuring Cozz)	Salter; Cody Osagie; Colin Calabrese; Art Posey; Josef Powell	DJ Grumble	3:39
3.	"Night Drive"	Salter; J. Bryant; J. Brooks	Hollywood JB	2:30
4.	"La La La La"	Salter; David James Miller	Dave James	5:52
5.	"Cold Outside"	Salter; Calabrese; Rodney Franklin	DJ Grumble	2:22
6.	"Backwood"	Salter; Calabrese; Keithen Carter; Larry Williams	DJ Grumble	2:48
7.	"GOAT"	Salter; Calabrese; Steve Gray	DJ Grumble	2:27
Total length:				22:21

Sample credits

- "Backseat" samples "Come Make Love to Me" by Jeanie Tracy.
- "Night Drive" samples "You Light Up My Life" by Jean Carne.
- "Cold Outside" samples "Life Moves On" by Rodney Franklin.
- "Backwood" samples "Whole Lot of Love" by Heaven and Earth.
- "GOAT" samples "Beverly Hills" by Steve Gray.
