= Shea Butter Baby =

Studio album by Ari Lennox
- Released: May 7, 2019
- Recorded: 2015–19
- Genres: R&B; soul; neo soul; jazz
- Length: 44:22
- Labels: Dreamville; Interscope
- Producers: Jermaine Cole (also exec.); Elite (also exec.); Ibrahim Hamad (exec.); Bigg Kid; Christo; Deputy; DJ Grumble; Hollywood JB; Jaylen Rojas; Kojo; Masego; Nick Quinn; Omen; Ron Gilmore; Shroom

Ari Lennox chronology
Pho (2016)	Shea Butter Baby (2019)	Shea Butter Baby (Remix EP) (2020)

Singles from Shea Butter Baby
- 1. "Whipped Cream" Released: July 16, 2018; 2. "Shea Butter Baby" Released: February 26, 2019; 3. "BMO" Released: August 6, 2019

Shea Butter Baby is the debut studio album by American singer Ari Lennox. It was released on May 7, 2019, by Dreamville and Interscope Records. The album was executive produced by Dreamville producer Elite. In addition, the majority of the album was produced by Dreamville's in-house producers: J. Cole, Elite, Omen, Ron Gilmore, and Christo, among others.

== Background ==
Ari Lennox was signed to Dreamville Records in 2015 after her music had been circulating throughout the label. Eventually, they flew her to their studio to work on references for Rihanna, but the songs wound up going to Lennox because she was "not really a songwriter for other artists," and wrote personal records for herself.

== Release and promotion ==
On July 16, 2018, Ari Lennox released the lead single, "Whipped Cream", for her debut album, with an accompanied music video on September 5. During November 2018, Ari released four promotional singles: "40 Shades of Choke", "Grampa", "No One" and "Pedigree".

The title track being the second single "Shea Butter Baby" with J. Cole, was released on February 26, 2019, which first appeared on the Creed II soundtrack on November 16, 2018. The song was accompanied by a music video on February 20, 2019, that was directed by Bennett Johnson and surpassed three million views via YouTube within the first week. On April 30, Ari Lennox announced the release date and tracklist of the album, and released the fifth promotional single "Up Late", and the music video for the song was released on May 14. On August 5, a live performance of the song "I Been" at A Colors Show was released. On August 6, she released the music video for "BMO", directed by Child.

=== Tours ===
On March 27, 2019, she announced her first headlining tour, with the first leg beginning on May 12 and ending on June 14 in her hometown Washington, D.C., with supporting acts Baby Rose, Mikhala Jené, and Ron Gilmore. The second leg of the tour is in Europe beginning in December.

=== Remix EP ===
On March 27, 2020, Shea Butter Baby (Remix EP) was released, featuring guest appearances from Doja Cat, Smino, and Durand Bernarr. It included remixes for the songs "BMO", "I Been" and "Facetime".

== Writing and recording ==
Ari Lennox spoke with Complex about the writing process of the album saying, it "is just whatever is happening in my life right then and there. Sometimes it's just very blunt." She told XXL about the experiences she expressed on the album saying "I'm singing about my first apartment, about liking broke niggas—if your soul is beautiful then who cares? I have this joint called "Static" [where] I talk about my anxiety in a metaphorical way. Just a lot of sex, soul, romance and hip-hop."

She began working on her debut album promptly after getting signed to Dreamville, and took four years to complete. Ron Gilmore spoke on the recording process and how the album evolved to its final form in an interview with Revolt, saying:

There were different track-listings for sure. But, this is pretty much it. It was a long, tedious process to even get to 12 songs. There are more songs that are also good. It wasn't one of those situations where we thought we had the album before. Nah, we pretty much worked on what we worked on and maybe a month before [the release], we came to grips with what was going to be on the album. I know the ones that we did in 2015 -- 'I Been' and 'Facetime'-- kept making it through the cut lists. It would be a tracklist and it would be 20 songs. Then, it was cutting from there, and cutting from there, and cutting from there until we got to 12.

Omen produced "BMO" which samples Galt MacDermot's "Space". Ari's manager, Justin LaMotte asked Omen to send the file so they could work on it, but his computer was damaged and the files were lost. After remaking the beat, he got in with Ron Gilmore and added some music, with Elite helping them tweak some of the sounds. Christo created the beat for "Broke", with additional producers adding "some sparkles or arrangements here and there." JID sent in his verse for the song at the last minute before turning in the album. At the end of "Speak to Me", Elite and Gilmore had Carlin White play some live drums into a "Latin groove" at the end.

Elite also talked about "Static" being his favorite song on the album saying "when I first heard it played back, I got emotional. I felt goosebumps, and it was tugging at my emotions -- so when that happens with the song, I always think it's special, because I know if I feel that way, somebody else out there is going to feel that way." Ari claims that "New Apartment" is the most important song on the album saying "it’s different, it’s so unique and it comes from my soul. It’s super important for people to move out when they can and experience their own world and their own space. It’s important to celebrate that." Anytime the song was questioned about not making the album, Ari would vehemently disagree. The skits on the album derived from audio recordings from Ari's Instagram Live, which was Cole's idea to keep an archive of the footage.

== Critical reception ==
Professional ratings
Aggregate scores
Source	Rating
Metacritic	81/100
Review scores
Source	Rating
Clash	8/10
Exclaim!	7/10
HipHopDX	4.1/5 stars
Pitchfork	7.6/10

At Metacritic, which assigns a normalized rating out of 100 to reviews from mainstream publications, the album received an average score of 81, indicating "universal acclaim".

Writing for Pitchfork, Ann-Derrick Gaillot said, "The debut album from the neo-soul singer-songwriter is driven by warm funk and soul and has the healing familiarity of hanging out on the couch commiserating with a best friend." The writer asserted that the album "grounds the spiritual sultriness of neo-soul and R&B in irreverent frankness, subverting the idea that the modern self-assured woman must maintain a divine facade. There's power, she suggests, in celebrating the imperfect and slightly messy, rather than chunks of reality polished smooth." Writing for Exclaim!, A. Harmony said the album "is a charming coming-of-age tale that is endearing in its relatable simplicity."

Cherise Johnson of HipHopDX said the album "essentially satisfies a thirst for the kind of rhythm and blues that feels good to spirit, much like a home-cooked meal after returning home from college for the first time. It's a coming-of-age project, filled with honest words backed with real instrumentation and speaks for a generation of Black women who just want to be themselves — and clearly, no one, not Ari anyway, is waiting for permission." Tyrell Nicolas of Clash gave a positive review of the album, saying it "manages to meld contemporary R&B with other sounds like soul, funk, and blues, all while introducing us to the Ari Lennox of today – and the inspirations that guide her every move." The writer continued to say "Perhaps the most endearing aspect of 'Shea Butter Baby' is an authentic innocence that threads through it – the subtle interludes that feature in the space between songs lay bare Ari Lennox's passions, fears, desires, and intentions." Amira Rasool of Paper wrote about the topics of the album saying "To the average listener, the themes of love and love lost between two lovers may standout most on the album, but for Lennox, the empowerment of Black women and their place in the world is what she hopes will shine through."

=== Accolades ===
Year-end lists
Publication	List	Rank	Ref.
Associated Press	AP's Top Albums of 2019	1	
Billboard	The 50 Best Albums of 2019	33	
Clash	Clash Albums Of The Year 2019	34	
Complex	The Best Albums of 2019	26	
Noisey	The 100 Best Albums of 2019	5	
NPR	The 25 Best Albums of 2019	12	
People	People's 10 Best Albums of 2019	8	
Vibe	The 30 Best Albums of 2019	1	

== Commercial performance ==
With only three days of tracking, the album debuted at number 104 on the US Billboard 200 chart, and moved up to number 67 the following week. It also peaked at number 38 on the US Top R&B/Hip-Hop Albums chart, and number 7 on the US R&B chart.

== Track listing ==
Credits adapted from Tidal.

No.	Title	Writer(s)	Producer(s)	Length
1.	"Chicago Boy"	Courtney Salter; Anthony Parrino; Ron Gilmore Jr.; Chico Hamilton	Elite; Ron Gilmore^{[a]}	4:48
2.	"BMO"	Salter; Damon Coleman; Parrino; Gilmore Jr.; Galt MacDermot	Omen; Elite^{[a]}; Gilmore^{[a]}	2:26
3.	"Broke" (featuring JID)	Salter; Destin Route; John Welch; Gilmore Jr.; Parrino; Jamil Pierre	Christo; Gilmore^{[a]}; Elite^{[a]}; Deputy^{[a]}	4:02
4.	"Up Late"	Salter; Justin Bryant; Nicholas Venezia; Oliver Bergqvist; Kojo Asamoah	Nick Quinn; Masego; Kojo; Hollywood JB; Bigg Kid	4:26
5.	"Shea Butter Baby" (with J. Cole)	Salter; Jermaine Cole; Anthony Parrino; Tim Schoegje	Elite; Shroom	3:31
6.	"Speak to Me"	Salter; Parrino; Gilmore Jr.	Elite; Gilmore	3:44
7.	"New Apartment"	Salter; Colin Calabrese; Parrino; Hubert Laws; Alexander Wesley Scott	DJ Grumble; Elite^{[a]}	3:56
8.	"Facetime"	Salter; Cole	J. Cole; Craig Brockman^{[a]}	2:31
9.	"Pop"	Salter; Jaylen Rojas	Jaylen Rojas	2:18
10.	"I Been"	Salter; Gilmore Jr.	Gilmore	3:41
11.	"Whipped Cream"	Salter; Larry Blackmon; Theo Croker; Gilmore Jr.; Parrino	Elite; Gilmore^{[a]}	4:48
12.	"Static"	Salter; Parrino; Gilmore Jr.; Roy Ayers	Elite; Gilmore^{[a]}	4:11
Total length:				44:22

Notes

- ^{^[a]} signifies an additional producer.

Sample credits

- "Chicago Boy" samples "Gengis" by Chico Hamilton.
- "BMO" samples "Space" by Galt MacDermot.
- "Broke" samples "Lullaby" by Chargaux feat. Soft Glas.
- "New Apartment" samples "Land of Passion" by Hubert Laws.
- "Whipped Cream" samples "Two of Us" by Cameo.
- "Static" samples "Look Into The Sky" by RAMP.

== Personnel ==
Technical

- Juro "Mez" Davis – mixing (all tracks)

== Charts ==
Chart (2019)	Peak position
US Billboard 200	67
US Top R&B/Hip-Hop Albums (Billboard)	38
US Heatseekers Albums (Billboard)	4

== Certifications ==
Region	Certification	Certified units/sales
United States (RIAA)	Gold	500,000^{‡}
^{‡} Sales+streaming figures based on certification alone.
