= Age/Sex/Location (album) =

Studio album by Ari Lennox
- Released: September 9, 2022
- Recorded: 2019–2022
- Genre: R&B; soul; neo soul
- Length: 41:23
- Label: Dreamville; Interscope
- Producer: Bryan-Michael Cox; Cardiak; Dre Pinckney; DZL; Elite; Ibrahim Hamad; J. Cole; Jermaine Dupri; J. White Did It; LOXE; Michael Bearden; Organized Noize; Ron Gilmore; Slimwav; Theo Croker; Tim Suby; WU10

Ari Lennox chronology
Away Message (2022)	Age/Sex/Location (2022)	Vacancy (2026)

Singles from Age/Sex/Location
- 1. "Pressure" Released: September 10, 2021; 2. "Hoodie" Released: August 12, 2022; 3. "Waste My Time" Released: October 8, 2022

Age/Sex/Location (stylized in all lowercase) is the second studio album by American singer Ari Lennox. It was released on September 9, 2022, by Dreamville and Interscope Records. The album was executive produced by Dreamville producer Elite, and includes guest appearances from Lucky Daye, Chlöe, and Summer Walker.

== Background ==
On August 31, 2022, J. Cole shared a message on Instagram asking Ari Lennox what the album means to her, to which she said:

"Transitional space. Very vulnerable codependent and validation seeking part of my life. I remember the countless times I was kicked out of dating apps because they didn't think I was really myself, it reminded me of those age/sex/location days where I actually wasn't being myself in those chat rooms. No more tip toeing. No more docile. Providing grace and compassion to myself. Blocking those that no longer serve me or just literally not responding. Blocking the resistance to heal. Allowing accountability and maturing. Allowing growth to happen. Allowing self worth and self love and inner work to happen. Allowing therapy. Allowing dating me to happen. Doing things I like to do whenever I want. Learning new things. Allowing that desperation and neediness to fade. What's for me is for me and I'm complete on my own."

She has also compared the story of the album to Elizabeth Gilbert's memoir Eat, Pray, Love, saying "This is my eat pray love journey. And it's my honest goodbye to searching for love. I got it right here inside of me. The end of searching for anything other than self love and family. Pouring into me and giving the greatest love to me."

== Release and promotion ==
On September 10, 2021, Ari Lennox released the single "Pressure", produced by Jermaine Dupri and Bryan-Michael Cox. The music video was released on September 11, 2021, and written and directed by Chandler Lass. It is partly an homage to singers Diana Ross and Donna Summer. The song became her first solo charting single on the Billboard Hot 100, her first Radio No. 1 single, and reached number 3 on R&B/Hip-Hop Airplay.

On August 12, 2022, Ari Lennox released her second single "Hoodie", and announced the title and release date of the album. On August 31, she released a promotional single "Queen Space" featuring Summer Walker. Later that day, she released a surprise 5-track EP called Away Message, including songs that were recorded for the album but did not make the final cut. On September 7, she revealed the tracklist of the album, including features from Lucky Daye, Chlöe, and Summer Walker. "Waste My Time" was released to adult urban contemporary radio as the third single on October 8, 2022.

== Critical reception ==
Professional ratings
Review scores
Source	Rating
AllMusic	4.5/5 stars
Pitchfork	7.7/10
Rolling Stone	4/5 stars

Upon its release, Age/Sex/Location was well received by critics. Rolling Stone rated the album 4 out of 5 stars, "Time will tell whether age/sex/location wins over a mainstream audience or turns into one of those under-appreciated R&B albums that fans hoard decades later, like Amel Larrieux's Infinite Possibilities and Adriana Evans. No matter: age/sex/location deserves to be more than an overpriced Discogs collectable. She needs her flowers now." Uproxx wrote a positive review of the album saying "On Age/Sex/Location, Ari Lennox signs into a virtual world that could easily be her reality [...] As she navigates the twists, turns, risky climbs, and unprotected freefalls of her current "eat pray love" journey, it's with more discipline and increased wisdom from past missteps."

Craig Jenkins of Vulture compared parts of the album to the likes of Erykah Badu on "POF", Dungeon Family on "Outside", Roberta Flack with "Pressure", and compared "Boy Bye" to Lauryn Hill and D'Angelo's "Nothing Even Matters" and Rihanna and Ne-Yo's "Hate That I Love You". Shifter Magazine highlighted the features on the album mentioning the chemistry between Ari and Lucky Daye on "Boy Bye", "leaving us wanting more male-female R&B/soul duets which appear to be less and less common", and "the blazing hot Chloë on 'Leak It' with a hint of 1960s R&B harmonies and Summer Walker". Praising the album in the review for AllMusic, Andy Kellman pointed out that "Most illuminating are the slow jams that, like a few songs off the debut, either repurpose or evoke mellow R&B and jazz grooves from the late '70s."

== Track listing ==
Age/Sex/Location track listing
No.	Title	Writer(s)	Producer(s)	Length
1.	"POF"	Courtney Salter; Jermaine Cole; Kelvin Wooten; Michael Holmes	DZL; J. Cole; Wu10	3:40
2.	"Hoodie"	Salter; Anthony Parrino; Jonathan Floyd; Stafford Floyd	Elite	4:01
3.	"Waste My Time"	Salter; Uzoechi Emenike; Rowan Perkins; Timothy Suby	Suby; LOXE	2:44
4.	"Pressure"	Salter; Parrino; Jai'Len Josey; Bryan-Michael Cox; Jermaine Dupri; Johntá Austin	Jermaine Dupri; Bryan-Michael Cox	3:12
5.	"A/S/L (Interlude)"	Salter; Parrino; Wooten; Ronald Gilmore	Elite; Michael Bearden; Ron Gilmore; Theo Crocker; Wu10	0:38
6.	"Mean Mug"	Salter; Parrino; Wooten	Elite; Wu10	4:03
7.	"Boy Bye" (featuring Lucky Daye)	Salter; Parrino; David Debrandon Brown; Ibrahim Hamad	Elite; Ibrahim Hamad	5:01
8.	"Stop By"	Salter; Anthony White; Josey	J. White Did It	2:50
9.	"Outside"	Salter; Rico Wade; Anthony Parrino; Ray Murray; Patrick Brown; Vanessa Wood; Dijon Styles; Steve Rosenstein; Morris Ricks	Elite; Organized Noize	3:18
10.	"Leak It" (featuring Chlöe)	Salter; Chloe Bailey; Carl McCormick; Wooten	Cardiak; Wu10	4:27
11.	"Blocking You"	Salter; Parrino; Jerome Monroe Jr; Holmes	DZL; Elite; Ron Gilmore; SlimWav	3:40
12.	"Queen Space" (with Summer Walker)	Salter; Summer Walker; André Pinckney; Anthony Parrino; Elliott Trent; Ronald Gilmore; Storm Ford	Dre Pickney; Elite; Ron Gilmore	3:50
Total length:				41:23

== Charts ==
Chart performance for Age/Sex/Location
Chart (2022)	Peak position
UK Album Downloads (OCC)	53
UK R&B Albums (OCC)	39
US Billboard 200	69
US Top R&B/Hip-Hop Albums (Billboard)	36
