= Pressure (Ari Lennox song) =

Single by Ari Lennox

from the album Age/Sex/Location
- Released: September 10, 2021
- Genre: R&B
- Length: 3:13
- Label: Dreamville; Interscope
- Songwriters: Courtney Salter; Jermaine Mauldin; Bryan-Michael Cox; Anthony Parrino; Johntá Austin; Jai'Len Josey; Bettye Crutcher
- Producers: Jermaine Dupri; Bryan-Michael Cox; Elite

Ari Lennox singles chronology
"Set Him Up" (2021)	"Pressure" (2021)	"My Favorite Things" (2021)

Music video
- "Pressure" on YouTube

"Pressure" is a song by American singer Ari Lennox, released as a single on September 10, 2021, through Dreamville and Interscope Records. It is the lead single from Lennox's second studio album Age/Sex/Location, and samples the bass line from Shirley Brown's 1977 song "Blessed Is the Woman (With a Man Like Mine)". Produced by Jermaine Dupri, Bryan-Michael Cox, and Elite, "Pressure" is Lennox's highest-charting solo single, reaching number 66 on the US Billboard Hot 100 chart.

== Critical reception ==
Latesha Harris of NPR described the track as "a half-Motown, half-808s fantasia about being the center of attention during foreplay" and wrote that it "elevates [Lennox's] status as a neo-soul touchstone, referencing the soul divas before her and leading the way for those to come with fearless, intoxicating charm".

== Music video ==
The music video was released on September 11, 2021, and written and directed by Chandler Lass. It is partly an homage to singers Diana Ross and Donna Summer.

== Charts ==
=== Weekly charts ===
Weekly chart performance for "Pressure"
Chart (2021–2022)	Peak position
New Zealand Hot Singles (RMNZ)	29
US Billboard Hot 100	66
US Hot R&B/Hip-Hop Songs (Billboard)	20
US R&B/Hip-Hop Airplay (Billboard)	2

=== Year-end charts ===
2022 year-end chart performance for "Pressure"
Chart (2022)	Position
US Hot R&B/Hip-Hop Songs (Billboard)	44

== Certifications ==
Certifications for "Pressure"
Region	Certification	Certified units/sales
New Zealand (RMNZ)	Gold	15,000^{‡}
United States (RIAA)	Gold	500,000^{‡}
^{‡} Sales+streaming figures based on certification alone.
