= Revenge of the Dreamers II =

Compilation album by Dreamville Records
- Released: December 8, 2015
- Recorded: 2015
- Genre: Hip hop; R&B
- Length: 30:20
- Label: Dreamville; Interscope
- Producer: J. Cole; Cedric Brown; K-Quick; Soundwave; Meez; Elite; Ron Gilmore; DJ Grumble; J Dilla

Dreamville Records chronology
Revenge of the Dreamers (2014)	Revenge of the Dreamers II (2015)	Revenge of the Dreamers III (2019)

Revenge of the Dreamers II is the second compilation album by American record label Dreamville Records and was released on December 8, 2015. The album includes contributions by Dreamville artists, J. Cole, Bas, Cozz, Omen, Lute, and Ari Lennox. Producers on this album include, J. Cole, Cedric Brown, K-Quick, Soundwave, Meez, Elite, Ron Gilmore Jr., DJ Grumble, and J Dilla.

== Background ==
On December 12, 2015, posters promoting a surprise Dreamville concert were seen in subway stations and local stores in New York, NY. The concert crawl kicked off at Drom, followed by a Cake Shop appearance, and concluded with an encore at SOB's. The idea of the series, Cole said, was "to get back to the sense of underground and raw musical talent, and celebrating artists with a true, uncensored craft."

The tracks "Grow" and "Tabs" are found on Cozz's mixtape, Nothin' Personal (2016). "Housewives" and "Night Job" are featured on Bas' album Too High to Riot (2016). "Backseat" is featured on Ari Lennox's EP Pho (2016). "Still Slummin'" was featured on Lute's debut studio album West1996 pt. 2 (2017).

== Critical reception ==
Professional ratings
Review scores
Source	Rating
Pitchfork	6.2/10

Pitchfork gave the compilation a 6.2 out of 10 saying "Fumbled legacy-building though it is, Dreamers is not without its bright spots. The tape introduces the label's two newest signees: the Washington, D.C.-bred singer Ari Lennox and lute, a rapper from Charlotte who joins Cole in representing North Carolina. Each artist contributes one song here, both of which are among the best on the tape; lute's Dilla-cribbing "Still Slummin" in particular is superb, throwing you immediately into his world and dispensing plaintive, delightfully un-cinematic notes." Yoh Phillips from DJBooth said "J. Cole has surrounded himself with artists that are passionate. You can hear it, they want this, a quality they all share. It’s weird, I remember watching J. Cole come up, no pun intended. Part of his success is the story of his struggle, going from North Carolina to the big city with a dream to make it as a rapper. It’s a story that anyone can relate to.'

== Track listing ==
No.	Title	Writer(s)	Producer(s)	Length
1.	"Folgers Crystals" (J. Cole)	Jermaine Cole; Anthony Parrino	Elite; J. Cole	2:23
2.	"Night Job" (Bas featuring J. Cole)	Cole; Abbas Hamad; Ron Gilmore	Cedric Brown; K-Quick; Ron Gilmore^{[a]}	3:13
3.	"Backseat" (Ari Lennox featuring Cozz)	Courtney Salter; Cody Osagie	DJ Grumble	3:38
4.	"Caged Bird" (J. Cole featuring Omen)	Cole; Darren Coleman	Meez	3:59
5.	"48 Laws" (Omen featuring Donnie Trumpet)	Coleman; Donnie Trumpet	Elite	2:19
6.	"Housewives" (Bas)	Hamad; Gilmore	Soundwave; Gilmore^{[a]}	3:16
7.	"Tabs" (Cozz featuring Bas)	Osagie; Hamad	Meez	3:46
8.	"Still Slummin'" (Lute)	Luther Nicholson; James Yancey	J Dilla	3:28
9.	"Grow" (Cozz featuring Correy C)	Osagie	Meez	4:17
Total length:				30:20

Notes

- ^{^[a]} signifies an additional producer
- Caged Bird samples We Do It by Disco Orchestral
- Folgers Crystals samples Babe I'm Yours by Whilk & Misky
- Night Job samples No More by Jeremy and Shlohmoh

== Charts ==
Chart (2015)	Peak position
US Billboard 200	24
US Top R&B/Hip-Hop Albums (Billboard)	4
US Rap Albums (Billboard)	3
