= Theo Croker =

American jazz trumpeter, composer, and vocalist (born 1985)

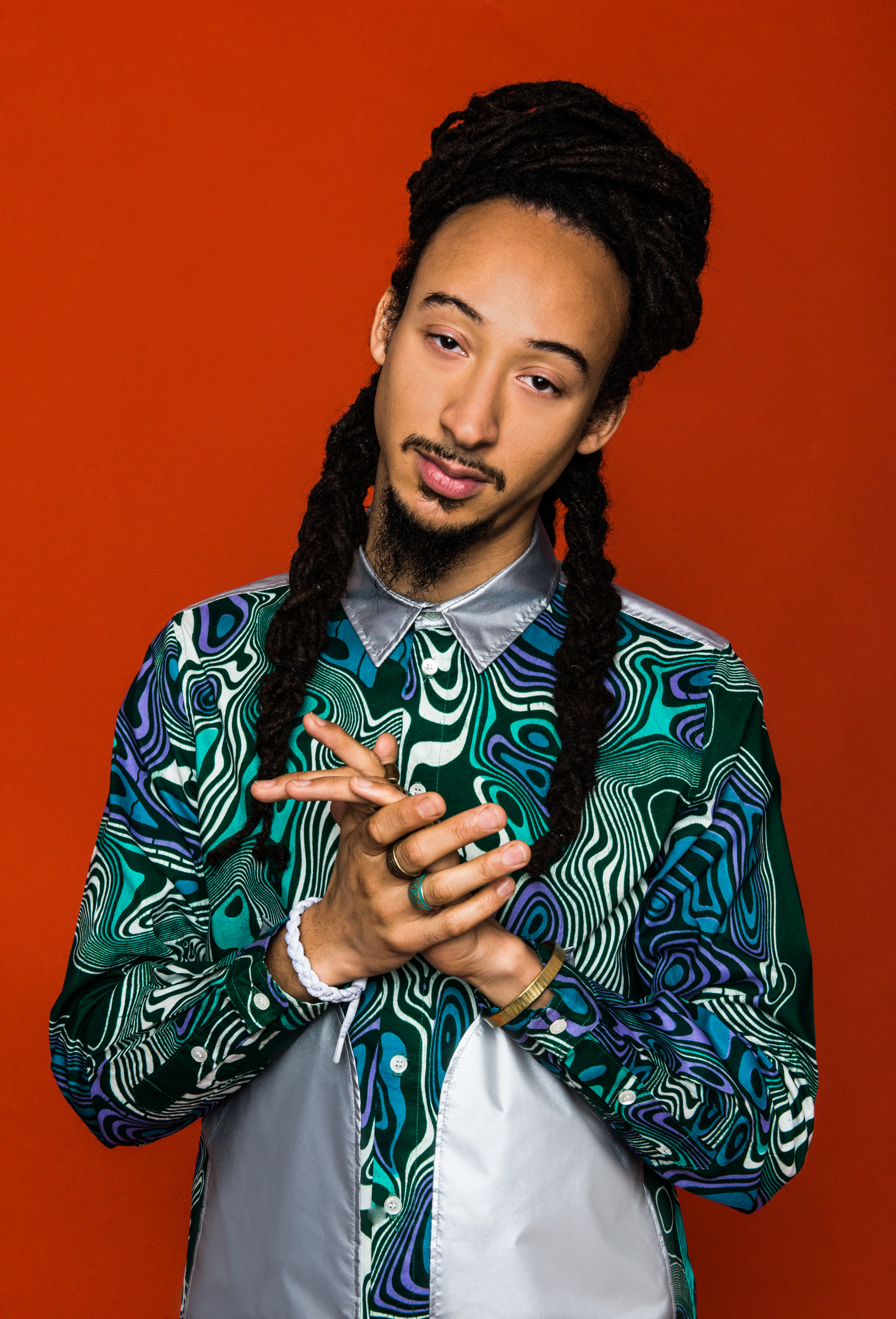
- Theo Croker in 2016

Background information
- Born: Theodore Lee Croker; July 18, 1985 (age 41); Leesburg, Florida, U.S.
- Genres: Jazz; hip-hop; pop
- Occupations: Musician, trumpeter, composer, record producer, vocalist
- Instrument: Trumpet
- Years active: 2000–present
- Labels: Sony, Okeh, Arbors
- Website: theocroker.com

Theodore Lee Croker (/ˈkroʊk.ər/ KROH-kər; born July 18, 1985) is an American jazz trumpeter, composer, producer and vocalist. He is a Grammy Award nominee, three-time Echo Award nominee, as well as a Theodore Presser Award recipient.

Croker has released over seven studio albums, including Fundamentals (2006), In the Tradition (2009), Afro Physicist (2014), Escape Velocity (2016), Star People Nation (2019), BLK2Life / A Future Past (2021), and Love Quantum (2022). He has also been featured on J. Cole's 4 Your Eyez Only (2016), Common's Black America Again (2016), and Ari Lennox's debut album, Shea Butter Baby (2019).

== Early life ==
Croker was born July 18, 1985, in Leesburg, Florida, and is the second son of William Henry Croker, a civil rights activist, high school principal, and farmer, and Alicia Cheatham, a guidance counselor and daughter of Grammy Award-winning trumpeter Doc Cheatham. Croker began playing trumpet at age 11, inspired by his grandfather. By his teens, he was studying music at the Douglas Anderson School of the Arts in Jacksonville.

Croker attended the Oberlin Conservatory of Music, where he graduated with a degree in jazz studies. While there, he was mentored by trumpeter and educator Donald Byrd.

== Career ==
=== 2007–2013: Asia ===
Croker held a five-month residency at Shanghai's House of Blues & Jazz. Soon after, he was hired as the house band for Asia Uncut Star Network, a late-night television show modeled on The Tonight Show, where he served as music director, bandleader, and in-house composer until mid-2010.

In July 2010, Croker became the first artist in residence at Shanghai's Peace Hotel Jazz Bar, the oldest and longest-running music club in China. (Both the Jazz Bar and the hotel, now the Fairmont Peace Hotel, date back to the 1920s when it was known as the Cathay Hotel.)

It was also in 2010 that Croker met and performed for the first time with vocalist Dee Dee Bridgewater. Over the next two years, Bridgewater and Croker kept in touch, exchanging musical ideas. In 2014, Bridgewater produced with him his third studio album, Afro Physicist, which featured herself as vocalist on three tracks, guest appearances by vibraphonist Stefon Harris on an interpretation of Stevie Wonder's "Visions", and fellow trumpeter Roy Hargrove singing on his own composition, "Roy Allen", arranged by Croker. The rhythm section included Karriem Riggins on drums and keyboardist Sullivan Fortner, who had played on Croker's first two albums, backing the reed and brass sections that performed Croker's lavish arrangements.

In 2013, Croker returned to the United States after a seven-year stay in Shanghai, China, where he broadened his concept of jazz to encompass other genres such as salsa, fusion-rock, R&B, hip-hop, and blues.

=== 2016–2019: "The Messenger", Star People Nation ===
On March 1, the first single off of Star People Nation was released, titled "The Messenger", which pays homage to jazz drummer Elvin Jones. This track featured guest pianist Eric Lewis. Croker stated in an article from Earmilk, "How we swing our quarter note is the basis of all black music. It's the beat, and this song was made to reflect the power in that swing." "The Messenger" was arranged and recorded in Brooklyn, New York. It was mixed and mastered by Grammy Award-winning engineer, producer, and arranger Bob Power. On April 11, Croker's second lead single was premiered by Afropunk. This track is titled "Understand Yourself" and featured Jamaican reggae artist Chronixx. Qwest TV by Quincy Jones interviewed the composer about Star People Nation, which released on May 17. A music review by Floriane Esnault from Qwest TV stated, contrary to the political accents that are perhaps contained within the title Star People Nation, Croker refused to enter into this easy "hype" that he sees many musicians devoting themselves to according to. Croker then responded by saying, "I know that many people use jazz to spice up their music, politically, but don't give back to it because they don't learn it and don't respect the masters or their ancestors."

=== 2019-2025: The Feierabendhaus der BASF; orchestra debut ===
In 2019, Croker, China Moses, and the DVRK Funk band, under the direction of Fawzi Haimor, double headlined in Ludwigshafen, Germany at the Feierabendhaus der BASF. In 2025 he released the album Dream Manifest.

== Discography ==
Year	Title	Format	Record label	Genre
2006	The Fundamentals	Album	Left Sided	Jazz
2009	In the Tradition	Album	Arbors	Jazz
2014	Afro Physicist	Album	DDB Records, Sony Masterworks, Okeh Records	Jazz, Experimental
2015	DVRKFUNK	EP	DDB Records, Sony Masterworks, Okeh Records	Jazz, Experimental, Pop
2016	Escape Velocity	Album	DDB Records, Sony Masterworks, Okeh Records	Jazz, Experimental, Pop
2019	Star People Nation	Album	DDB Records, Sony Masterworks, Okeh Records	Jazz, Experimental, Pop
2020	Understand Yourself	EP	DDB Records, Sony Masterworks, Okeh Records	Jazz, Experimental, Soundtrack
2021	Blk2Life/A Future Past	Album	Sony Masterworks	Jazz
2022	Love Quantum	Album	Sony Masterworks	Jazz
2022	Jazz at Berlin Philharmonic XII: Sketches of Miles	Album	ACT	Jazz
2025	Dream Manifest	Album	Dom Recs	Jazz, soul, hip-hop, R&B
