= Dreamville Records =

American record label

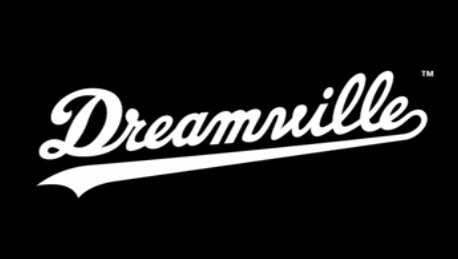
- Founded: 2007
- Founder: J. Cole; Ibrahim "Ib" Hamad
- Distributors: Independent (United States); Interscope Capitol Labels Group (United States); Polydor (United Kingdom); Universal Music Group (International)
- Genre: Hip hop; R&B
- Country of origin: United States
- Location: New York City, New York; Los Angeles, California; Raleigh, North Carolina
- Official website: dreamville.com

Dreamville Records is an American independent record label founded in 2007 by rapper J. Cole and his manager Ibrahim Hamad. The label ended its distribution deal with Interscope Records, a unit of Universal Music Group in July 2025. The roster includes Bas, Cozz, Omen, Lute, JID, EarthGang, and Cole himself. Dreamville also houses American record producers Elite, Ron Gilmore, and Cedric Brown.

== History ==
=== 2007–2012: Formation and early years ===
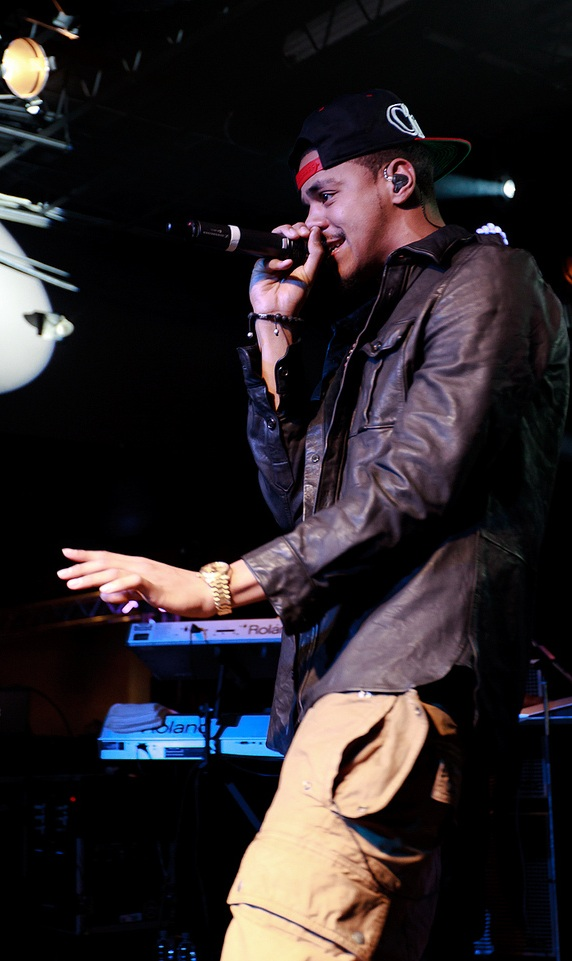
Rapper J. Cole founded the label in 2007

During the compositions of The Come Up, Cole started his own record label in early 2007, with current Sudanese-American label president Ibrahim Hamad. Cole and Hamad met while attending St. John's University. Cole sought for an avenue to release his own music, while Hamad yearned to start a record label, prompting the two to team up to form Dreamville Records. Rapper Omen has been affiliated with Dreamville since the beginning, Omen and Cole met on rapper Canibus chat forum at age 17, where they shared music. Omen was also featured on Cole's mixtapes, The Warm Up (2009) and Friday Night Lights (2010). In 2011, Dreamville was associated with rapper Voli and alternative rock band StartYourOwnRebellion, while Dreamville was still in early formation as a vanity label imprint.

=== 2013–2014: Revenge of the Dreamers ===
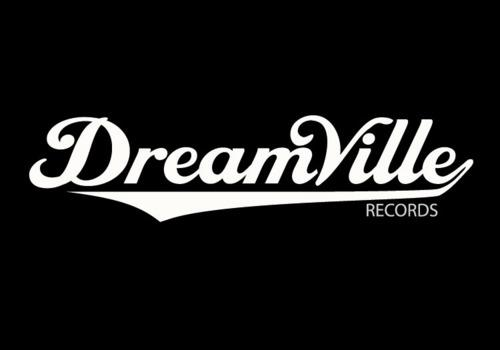
The Dreamville Records logo has been changed in 2014, when the label signed a deal with Interscope

On January 28, 2014, at a show at the Theater at Madison Square Garden, Cole announced that his Dreamville imprint had signed a distribution deal with Interscope Records. Attendees at the show received a flyer announcing the deal and a mixtape, titled Revenge of the Dreamers. On the same day, Cole announced the signing of Queens-based rapper, Bas. Cole spoke with Billboard about the Interscope deal saying: "We've been dreaming about a label situation for years." "The deal's been official since late December, and we'd been working on it for a while before that, but it felt too important to just go out and yell it right when it happened. It needed a more grand announcement." Cole explained that talks with Interscope began when Joie Manda, Interscope president of urban music, reached out to him in 2013, Cole said: "I thought he wanted me to produce someone over there and I was excited about that, but then he told me that he really believed in me as an executive, a label CEO and a producer. A Dr. Dre to his Jimmy Iovine. He had the vision."

=== 2014–2016: Revenge of the Dreamers II ===
On June 26, 2014, J. Cole officially announced the signing of Los Angeles-based rapper, Cozz. Omen didn't officially sign the Interscope deal until after his debut album in 2015. On December 8, 2015, Dreamville released a collaborative album titled, Revenge of the Dreamers II, officially announcing two new label signees, Charlotte rapper, Lute and Washington D.C. singer Ari Lennox. In an interview with the Rap Radar Podcast, Ibrahim Hamad broke down the self-sufficiency of the artists on the label saying: "I like letting them figure out what their path is. I look at it like, because we learned what we learned from Cole being signed, what I like to do is [say] ‘what is your vision, and let us help you’. I don't ever want to tell an artist no you can't do that, that's not fair to them."

=== 2017–2020: Revenge of the Dreamers III ===
On February 20, 2017, Dreamville announced the signing of East Atlanta-based rapper JID to the label. On August 31, 2017 Dreamville also announced the signing of EarthGang, a hip hop duo consisting of Atlanta-based rappers Olu (Johnny Venus) and WowGr8 (Doctur Dot – born Eian Parker). Both EarthGang and JID had previously toured with Bas and Omen prior to signing to the label.

On January 6, 2019, Dreamville announced a 10-day recording session in Atlanta for the label's third compilation album Revenge of the Dreamers III, ending on January 16. During the 2019 NBA All-Star Weekend in Charlotte, North Carolina, Dreamville held multiple events scheduled for the weekend, starting with an exclusive limited edition merchandise pop-up shop, a Dreamville brunch, and a private concert featuring the artists on the label taking place after the All Star game. On July 5, the label's third compilation album was released to critical acclaim and debuted at number one on the US Billboard 200, selling 115,000 album-equivalent units in its first week. The album earned nominations for Best Rap Album at the 2020 Grammy Awards, while "Middle Child" and "Down Bad" were nominated for Best Rap Performance. In April 2020, the album was certified Platinum by the Recording Industry Association of America.

=== 2021–present: D-Day: A Gangsta Grillz Mixtape and Creed III: The Soundtrack ===
On March 31, 2022, Dreamville released D-Day: A Gangsta Grillz Mixtape featuring guest appearances from 2 Chainz, ASAP Ferg, Young Nudy, Kenny Mason, Sheck Wes, G Perico, and Reason. The mixtape was released ahead of the second annual Dreamville Festival. In 2023, It was confirmed that Dreamville will be the primary artists to the soundtrack album to the sports drama film Creed III.

== Artists ==
=== Current artists ===
Act	Year signed	Releases under the label
J. Cole	2007 (founder)	9
Omen	2009	1
Bas	2013	8
Cozz	2014	4
Lute	2015	2
JID	2017	4
EarthGang	2017	3

=== Former acts ===
Act	Years on the label	Releases under the label
Ari Lennox	2015–2025	5

=== In-house producers ===
- J. Cole
- Elite
- Omen
- Ron Gilmore
- Cedric Brown
- KQuick (with Fresh2Def as ClickNPress)
- Jay "Kurzweil" Oyebadejo
- Meez
- Hollywood JB
- Christo

Studio personnel

- Juro "Mez" Davis (mixing and audio engineer)

== The Dreamville Foundation ==
In October 2011, Cole established The Dreamville Foundation, a 501(c)(3) non-profit organization "created to 'bridge the gap' between the world of opportunity and the urban youth" of Cole's hometown of Fayetteville, North Carolina. The foundation conducts philanthropic activities with the aid of volunteers, such as providing school supplies to students. The Foundation also launched a book club for young men and sponsored "The Nobody's Perfect Writing Contest and Mother's Day Brunch". It sponsors an annual weekend of Fayetteville community events called the "Dreamville Weekend" that features a discussion with the Young Men's Book Club, an appreciation dinner, and a career day panel with African-American professionals in a variety of fields.

In 2014, Cole purchased his childhood home in Fayetteville, North Carolina, for $120,000 through the Dreamville Foundation. The home had been repossessed from his mother years earlier while Cole was attending college in New York. His plan is to turn the house into a homestead for single mothers and their children, where they will be able to live rent-free. In 2017 NFL player Colin Kaepernick donated $32,000 to fund multiple projects for the organization.

In September 2018, the Dreamville Foundation unveiled a new initiative to aid victims of Hurricane Florence in Fayetteville, NC. According to the foundation's website, donated funds will go toward "hot food stations placed throughout the city, temporary housing options for families, and stocking of food pantries/shelters", as well as local charities that provide services to Fayetteville residents.

== Dreamville Festival ==
On April 27, 2018, J. Cole announced the Dreamville Festival, the festival featuring local music, culture, food and art, and also include a mix of up-and-comers and national acts. It is expected to be an annual festival. However, in the wake of Hurricane Florence, the event was postponed from its original date. The festival was rescheduled and held at the historic Dorothea Dix Park in Raleigh, North Carolina on April 6, 2019. The lineup included all of Dreamville's artists as well as SZA, Big Sean, Nelly, 21 Savage, 6LACK, Davido, Teyana Taylor, Saba, Rapsody, and Mez. The Dreamville Festival plan to donate proceeds to the Dorothea Dix Park Conservancy and the Dreamville Foundation. The festival sold out with a capacity of 40,000 people to become the largest event in Raleigh. Ibrahim Hamad remarked on the festival saying "We're not like other companies that are based in a city. Our label is very much an idea, more so than an actual physical place. So you can create it and take it everywhere. To bring that into the festival—where you can just create a place and make it Dreamville and be able to bring people there—was always this cool goal. And that's what makes it unique. It's not based in an actual city. It's just based in our minds."

For the 2020 season, the Dreamville Festival is front-of-jersey sponsor for USL Championship soccer team North Carolina FC. The second annual festival was initially slated for April 4, 2020 however, due to the COVID-19 pandemic, it was postponed and eventually cancelled. The festival went on at Dix Park as scheduled in 2022, with the dates of April 2–3, its first year being held for two days. The lineup was announced on March 2, a month prior to its commencement, and again included all Dreamville artists, as well as Fivio Foreign, Kehlani, Lil Baby, and Wizkid (Day 1), and Lil Wayne with Jeezy and T.I. as part of DJ Drama's "Gangsta Grillz", Moneybagg Yo, and T-Pain (Day 2). The attendance across the two days totaled 80,000, making it one of the most attended music events in North Carolina history. In addition, the event created an economic impact of $6.7M.

The event returned to Dix Park from April 1–2, 2023 and featured all Dreamville artists, as well as special guests Usher, Drake, Burna Boy, Sean Paul, and more. A concert representative reported that the event was sold out with an estimated attendance of 100,000.

As of 2025 Dreamville Festival has officially come to end of era. The last festival was held from April 5 to 6 and not live streamed as it was in the previous years. The line included Lil Wayne, 21 Savage, Erykah Badu, and extra. The festival will still continue, but under new management and name.

== Subsidiaries ==
=== Dreamville Ventures ===
On October 12, 2020, Dreamville announced the formation of Dreamville Ventures, a multi-disciplinary media company. Damien Scott is leading the division as president with Candace Rodney as executive vice president, overseeing daily operations including verticals across music, TV and film, publishing, apparel and live events. In a press release with Variety, Cole said: "Dreamville has always been a mom-and-pop operation with grand ambitions and ideas that extend far beyond music. The hiring of Damien and Candace not only expands our family business with two of the smartest and most capable executives in the industry, but allows us to take a massive leap towards turning those big ideas into reality."

=== Dreamville Studios ===
On October 12, 2020, Dreamville Studios was launched, a content studio that will produce original and co-produced content, with Candace Rodney who serves as president of Dreamville Studios. Ibrahim Hamad said in a press release: "Dreamville is a brand we built from the ground up and the appointments of Damien and Candace allows us to take the company to levels we’ve always dreamed of while keeping our core values and beliefs at the forefront of our expansion." Candace Rodney previously worked as senior vice president of development at Wilmore Films, as well as positions at Sony Pictures Television, Lionsgate Television and Creative Artists Agency.

=== Dreamville Films ===
Dreamville Films, Inc is an American entertainment company founded in 2015 that produces and distributes films. In 2015, they established a distribution deal HBO. They released documentaries J. Cole: Road to Homecoming, Forest Hills Drive: Homecoming, and J. Cole: 4 Your Eyez Only in partnership with HBO.

== Discography ==
=== Studio albums ===
Artist	Album	Details	Peak chart positions			Certification
Artist	Album	Details	US	US R&B/HH	US Rap	Certification
J. Cole	Born Sinner	Released: June 18, 2013; Label: Dreamville, Roc Nation, Columbia; Format: CD, LP, digital download	1	1	1	RIAA: Platinum
Bas	Last Winter	Released: April 27, 2014; Label: Dreamville, Interscope; Format: CD, digital download	103	18	13	
Cozz	Cozz & Effect	Released: October 3, 2014; Label: Dreamville, Interscope; Format: CD, digital download	160	31	17	
J. Cole	2014 Forest Hills Drive	Released: December 9, 2014; Label: Dreamville, Roc Nation, Columbia; Format: CD, digital download	1	1	1	RIAA: 3× Platinum
Omen	Elephant Eyes	Released: June 21, 2015; Label: Dreamville; Format: CD, digital download	–	–	–	
Bas	Too High to Riot	Released: March 4, 2016; Label: Dreamville, Interscope; Format: CD, digital download	49	7	6	
J. Cole	4 Your Eyez Only	Released: December 9, 2016; Label: Dreamville, Roc Nation, Interscope; Format: CD, LP, digital download	1	1	1	RIAA: Platinum
JID	The Never Story	Released: March 10, 2017; Label: Dreamville, Interscope, Spillage Village; Format: CD, vinyl, digital download	197	–	–	
Lute	West1996 pt. 2	Released: September 29, 2017; Label: Dreamville, Interscope; Format: CD, digital download	–	–	–	
Cozz	Effected	Released: February 13, 2018; Label: Dreamville, Interscope, Tha Committee; Format: CD, digital download	–	–	–	
J. Cole	KOD	Released: April 20, 2018; Label: Dreamville, Roc Nation, Interscope; Format: CD, LP, digital download	1	1	1	RIAA: Platinum
Bas	Milky Way	Released: August 24, 2018; Label: Dreamville, Interscope; Format: CD, digital download	35	19	17	
JID	DiCaprio 2	Released: November 26, 2018; Label: Dreamville, Interscope, Spillage Village; Format: CD, digital download	41	21	17	
Ari Lennox	Shea Butter Baby	Released: May 7, 2019; Label: Dreamville, Interscope; Format: CD, digital download	67	38	–	RIAA: Gold
EarthGang	Mirrorland	Released: September 6, 2019; Label: Dreamville, Interscope, Spillage Village; Format: CD, vinyl, digital download	40	22	20	
Spillage Village (with JID & EarthGang)	Spilligion	Released: September 25, 2020; Label: Dreamville, Interscope, SinceThe80s; Format: CD, vinyl, digital download	141	–	–	
J. Cole	The Off-Season	Released: May 14, 2021; Label: Dreamville, Interscope, Roc Nation; Format: CD, LP, digital download	1	1	1	
Lute	Gold Mouf	Released: October 4, 2021; Label: Dreamville, Interscope; Format: Digital download	–	–	–	
EarthGang	Ghetto Gods	Released: February 25, 2022; Label: Dreamville, Interscope; Format: Digital download	114	–	–	
JID	The Forever Story	Released: August 26, 2022; Label: Dreamville, Interscope; Format: Digital download	12	8	6	
Ari Lennox	Age/Sex/Location	Released: September 9, 2022; Label: Dreamville, Interscope; Format: Digital download	69	36	–	
Bas	We Only Talk About Real Shit When We're Fucked Up	Released: December 15, 2023; Label: Dreamville, Interscope; Format: Digital download	–	–	–	
JID	God Does Like Ugly	Released: August 8, 2025; Label: Dreamville, Interscope; Format: Digital download	11	4	2	
J.Cole	The Fall Off	Released: February 6, 2026; Label: Dreamville, Interscope; Format: Digital download	1	1	1	
"—" denotes a recording that did not chart or was not released in that territory.

=== Live albums ===
Artist	Album	Details	Peak chart positions
Artist	Album	Details	US
J. Cole	Forest Hills Drive: Live	Released: January 28, 2016; Label: Dreamville, Roc Nation, Columbia; Formats: CD, LP, digital download	71

=== Compilations ===
Artist	Album	Details	Peak chart positions			Certification
Artist	Album	Details	US	US R&B/HH	US Rap	Certification
Dreamville	Revenge of the Dreamers	Released: January 28, 2014; Label: Dreamville; Format: Digital download	–	–	–	
Dreamville	Revenge of the Dreamers II	Released: December 8, 2015; Label: Dreamville, Interscope; Format: CD, digital download	29	4	3	
Dreamville	Revenge of the Dreamers III	Released: July 5, 2019; Label: Dreamville, Interscope; Format: CD, LP, digital download	1	1	1	RIAA: Platinum
Dreamville	D-Day: A Gangsta Grillz Mixtape	Released: March 31, 2022; Label: Dreamville, Interscope; Format: Digital download	11	6	4	
"—" denotes a recording that did not chart or was not released in that territory.

=== Soundtrack albums ===
Artist	Album	Details	Peak chart positions
Artist	Album	Details	US
Dreamville	Creed III: The Soundtrack	Released: March 3, 2023; Label: Dreamville, Interscope; Format: Digital download	127

=== Extended plays ===
Artist	Extended play	Details
J. Cole	Truly Yours	Released: February 12, 2013
J. Cole	Truly Yours 2	Released: April 30, 2013
Bas	Two Weeks Notice	Released: April 15, 2014
Ari Lennox	Pho	Released: October 21, 2016; Chart positions: No. 20 U.S. R&B
Dreamville	1-888-88-DREAM	Released: June 12, 2019
Dreamville	ROTD3.COM	Released: July 1, 2019
Bas	Spilled Milk 1	Released: August 9, 2019
Ari Lennox	Shea Butter Baby (Remix EP)	Released: March 27, 2020
J. Cole	Lewis Street	Released: July 22, 2020
Cozz	Fortunate	Released: December 2, 2021
Bas	[BUMP] Pick Me Up	Released: April 15, 2022
Ari Lennox	Away Message	Released: August 31, 2022
EarthGang	EarthGang Vs The Algorithm: RIP Human Art	Released: September 22, 2023

=== Mixtapes ===
Artist	Mixtape	Details
J. Cole	The Warm Up	Released: June 15, 2009
J. Cole	Friday Night Lights	Released: November 10, 2010; Chart position: No. 7 U.S.
Bas	Quarter Water Raised Me Vol. 2	Released: May 26, 2013
Cozz	Nothin Personal	Released: January 4, 2016
J. Cole	Might Delete Later	Released: April 5, 2024

=== Singles ===
Title	Year	Peak chart positions					Certifications	Album
Title	Year	US	US R&B/HH	US Rap	CAN	NZ Hot	Certifications	Album
"Down Bad" (with J. Cole, JID, Bas & EarthGang featuring Young Nudy)	2019	64	26	22	69	10	RIAA: Platinum; RMNZ: Gold	Revenge of the Dreamers III
"Got Me" (with Ari Lennox & Omen featuring Ty Dolla Sign & Dreezy)	2019	—	— (Note: "Got Me" did not enter the Billboard Hot R&B/Hip-Hop Songs, but peaked at number 3 on the Bubbling Under R&B/Hip-Hop Songs chart.)	—	—	—	RIAA: Gold	Revenge of the Dreamers III
"LamboTruck" (with Cozz featuring Reason & Childish Major)	2019	—	—	—	—	—		Revenge of the Dreamers III
"Costa Rica" (with Bas & JID featuring Guapdad 4000, Reese LAFLARE, Jace, Mez, Smokepurpp, Buddy & Ski Mask the Slump God)	2019	75	30	—	71	—	RIAA: Platinum; RMNZ: Gold	Revenge of the Dreamers III
"Bussit" (with Ari Lennox)	2020	—	—	—	—	—		Revenge of the Dreamers III: Director's Cut
"Still Up" (with EarthGang featuring Reason)	2020	—	—	—	—	—		Revenge of the Dreamers III: Director's Cut
"—" denotes a recording that did not chart or was not released in that territory.

=== Other charted and certified songs ===
Title	Year	Peak chart positions				Certifications	Album
Title	Year	US	US R&B/HH	US Rap	CAN	Certifications	Album
"Under the Sun" (with J. Cole and Lute featuring DaBaby)	2019	44	18	16	72	RIAA: 2× Platinum; RMNZ: Platinum	Revenge of the Dreamers III
"Sacrifices" (with and EarthGang and J. Cole featuring Smino And Saba)	2019	—	—	—	—	RIAA: Platinum; RMNZ: Gold	Revenge of the Dreamers III
"—" denotes a recording that did not chart or was not released in that territory.
