= Omen (musician) =

American rapper (born 1982)

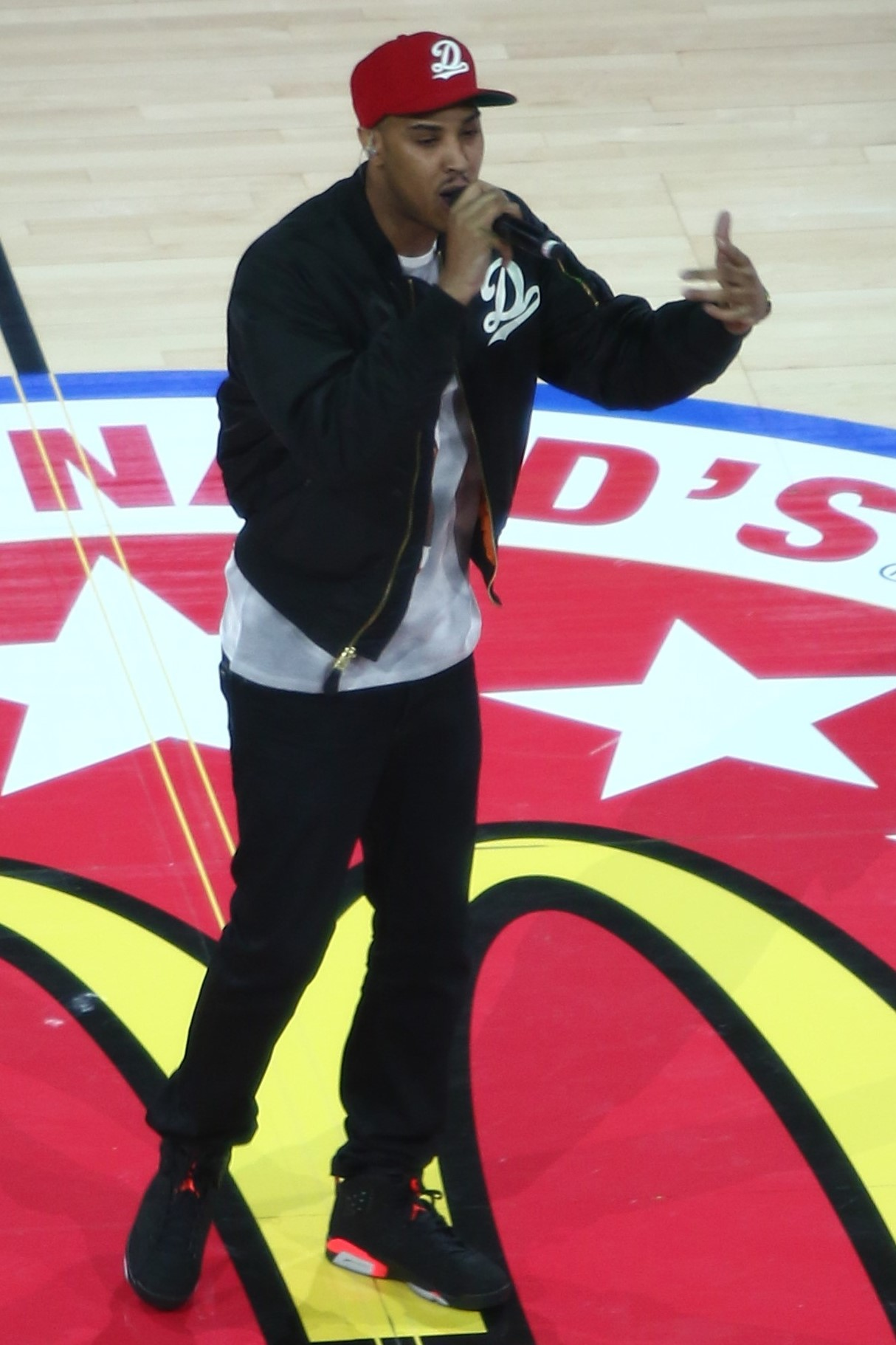
- Omen at halftime of the 2016 McDonald's All-American Boys Game

Background information
- Also known as: TDK
- Born: Damon Coleman; February 3, 1982 (age 44); Chicago, Illinois, U.S.
- Genres: Hip hop
- Occupations: Rapper; record producer
- Instruments: Vocals; keyboard
- Years active: 2010–present
- Labels: Dreamville; Interscope

Damon Coleman, better known by his stage name Omen, is an American rapper. He is signed to J. Cole's Dreamville Records and Interscope Records. His debut studio album Elephant Eyes, was released on July 21, 2015.

== Musical career ==
=== 2010–2013 ===
In 2010, Omen released his first mixtape, Delayed. The following year, he released critically acclaimed mixtape, Afraid of Heights. The mixtape includes guest features from J. Cole and Kendrick Lamar, among others.

=== 2014–present ===
In 2014, Omen then appeared on the Dreamville compilation mixtape Revenge of the Dreamers. That mixtape was released in celebration of Dreamville's partnership with Interscope Records.

On July 21, 2015, Omen's debut album, Elephant Eyes, was released after a few setbacks and date changes. During the Spring and Summer of 2015 Omen, was a part of the J. Cole's "2014 Forest Hills Drive" Tour with other acts Bas, Cozz, Pusha T, Jhene Aiko, Jeremih, YG, Big Sean, which brought him across North America as well as Europe. In the Fall of 2015 he went on his own Elephant Eyes Tour hitting Los Angeles, as well as, Boston, New York and his Hometown Chicago.

== Discography ==
=== Studio album ===
Album
Title	Album details
Elephant Eyes	Released: July 21, 2015; Label: Dreamville Records; Format: CD, digital download

=== Mixtapes ===
Title	Mixtape details
Delayed	Released: December 26, 2010; Format: Digital Download
Afraid of Heights	Released: November 6, 2011; Label: Dreamville Records; Format: Digital Download
A Glorious Cool	Released: November 8, 2012; Label: Dreamville Records; Format: Digital Download

=== Compilation albums ===
List of albums, with selected chart positions
Title	Details	Peak chart positions			Certifications
Title	Details	US	US R&B/HH	US Rap	Certifications
Revenge of the Dreamers II (with Dreamville)	Released: December 8, 2015; Label: Dreamville, Interscope; Format: CD, digital download	29	4	3	
Revenge of the Dreamers III (with Dreamville)	Released: July 5, 2019; Label: Dreamville, Interscope; Format: CD, digital download	1	1	1	RIAA: Platinum
D-Day: A Gangsta Grillz Mixtape (with Dreamville)	Released: March 31, 2022; Label: Dreamville, Interscope; Format: Digital download	11	6	4	

=== Singles ===
==== As lead artist ====
Title	Year	Album
"LoveDrug"	2015	Elephant Eyes
"Got Me" (Dreamville with Ari Lennox and Omen featuring Ty Dolla $ign, and Dreezy)	2019	Revenge of the Dreamers III

=== Guest appearances ===
List of non-single guest appearances, with other performing artists, showing year released and album name
Title	Year	Other artist(s)	Album
"The Badness"	2009	J. Cole	The Warm Up
"Enchanted"	2010	J. Cole	Friday Night Lights
"Pity"	2011	J. Cole, Voli	Any Given Sunday
"Relaxation"	2011	Fashawn, J. Cole	Higher Learning Vol. 2
"Sleep Deprived"	2019	Lute, Mez, DaVionne	Revenge of the Dreamers III
"PTSD"	2019	Mereba, Deante' Hitchcock, St. Beauty	Revenge of the Dreamers III
"Late Night"	2020	Cozz, Buddy, Landstrip Chip	Revenge of the Dreamers III: Director's Cut
"Revenge"	2020	Lute, Ari Lennox, EarthGang Childish Major, Reason	Revenge of the Dreamers III: Director's Cut
"Starting 5"	2022	Cozz, Lute	D-Day: A Gangsta Grillz Mixtape
"Ballin in Newport"	2022	—N/a	D-Day: A Gangsta Grillz Mixtape
