= Ari Lennox =

American R&B singer (born 1991)

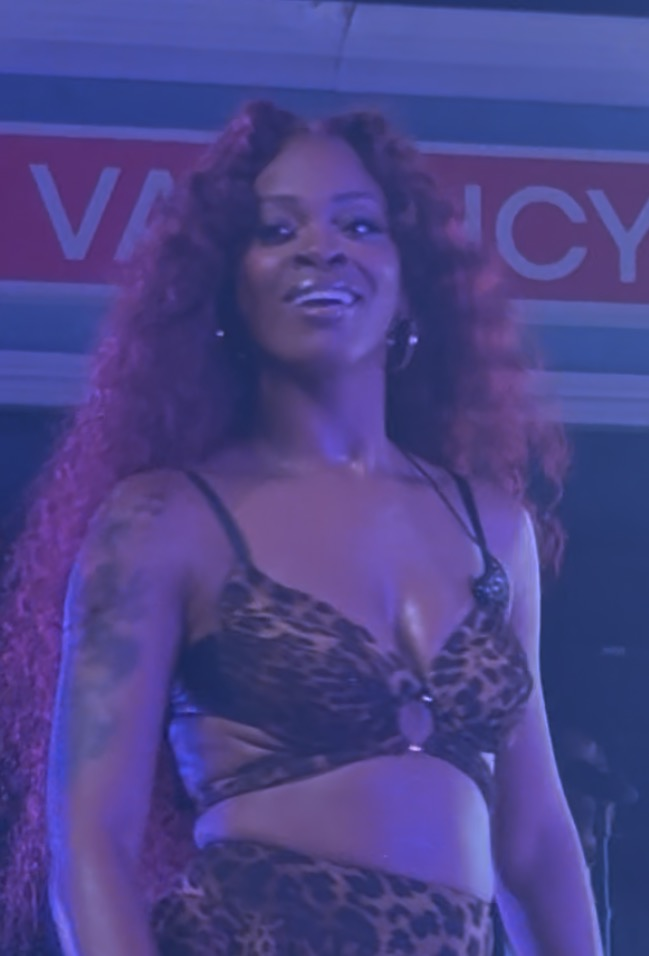
- Lennox in 2026

Background information
- Born: Courtney Shanade Salter; March 26, 1991 (age 35); Washington, D.C., U.S.
- Genres: R&B; soul; neo soul
- Occupations: Singer; songwriter
- Works: Ari Lennox discography
- Years active: 2011–present
- Labels: Dreamville; Interscope
- Website: arilennox.com
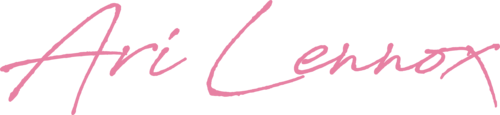

Courtney Shanade Salter (born March 26, 1991), known professionally as Ari Lennox, is an American R&B singer-songwriter from Washington, D.C. She signed with J. Cole's Dreamville Records, an imprint of Interscope Records as the former label's first female artist in 2015. She started gaining recognition after the release of her second extended play (EP) and major label debut, Pho (2016). That same year, she made an uncredited guest appearance on Cole's song "Change". Her first full-length album, Shea Butter Baby (2019), was met with a positive critical and commercial response.

Lennox also performed on the Dreamville compilation albums Revenge of the Dreamers II (2015) and Revenge of the Dreamers III (2019), the latter of which debuted atop the Billboard 200 chart and was nominated for Best Rap Album at the 62nd Annual Grammy Awards. Her 2021 single, "Pressure", marked her first entry on the Billboard Hot 100 and preceded her second album, Age/Sex/Location (2022), while her guest appearance on Summer Walker's song, "Unloyal", peaked within the chart's top 50 that same year.

== Early life ==
Courtney Salter was born on March 26, 1991, in Washington, D.C. to Gloria Salter and Shane Salter. She spent her formative years in the DMV area and attended Jackson-Reed High School and Duke Ellington School of the Arts. Her stage name was influenced by Mary Lennox, a character in the film adaptation of The Secret Garden (1993).

== Career ==
=== 2011–2017: Career beginnings and Pho EP ===
Ari Lennox began uploading her music on the internet in 2009. She released her debut mixtape, Five Finger Discount, and debut EP, Ariography, in 2013. In 2014, she independently released the single "Bound". On July 21, 2015, she was featured on Omen's album Elephant Eyes on the track "Sweat it Out". Later that year, her music began circulating the Dreamville Records team, as its founder J. Cole wanted her to work with him on references for Rihanna. She signed with the label in December 2015, and guest performed on their compilation album Revenge of the Dreamers II that same month—on the track "Backseat" with Cozz.

On October 21, 2016, she released her debut extended play, Pho. Ari Lennox later appeared on J. Cole's song "Change", and performed as an opening act on the 4 Your Eyez Only Tour during 2017.

=== 2018–2020: Shea Butter Baby ===
In 2018, she went on to guest feature on two songs with her label-mates: EarthGang on "Nothing but the Best", and Bas on "Icarus". On July 16, 2018, Ari Lennox released the first single, "Whipped Cream", from her debut album, Shea Butter Baby with an accompanied music video on September 5. On November 9, she released two more singles called "40 Shades of Choke" and "Grampa". On November 13, she then released two more singles called "No One" and "Pedigree". She then appeared on the Creed II soundtrack with J. Cole on a track entitled "Shea Butter Baby" on November 16, and released as a single on February 26, 2019, for her debut album of the same name. The track was accompanied by a music video on February 20, 2019, and surpassed 3 million views via YouTube within the first week. In December 2018, she was a supporting act on the, From East Atlanta With Love Tour, with 6LACK.

On March 27, 2019, she announced her first headlining tour, with the first leg beginning on May 12 and ending on June 14 in her hometown of Washington, D.C. Baby Rose and Mikhala Jené supported her on the tour. Her debut studio album, Shea Butter Baby was released on May 7, 2019. She also supported Lizzo on the Cuz I Love You Too Tour from July to October of 2019. She released multiple singles in 2020 including "Bussit", "Chocolate Pomegranate", and a cover of "If You Want Me to Stay", as well as guest appearances and collaborations with Kiana Ledé, Skip Marley, 6lack, and Spillage Village, among others.

=== 2021–present: Age/Sex/Location, Away Message, and Vacancy ===
On September 10, 2021, Ari Lennox released the single "Pressure", produced by Jermaine Dupri and Bryan-Michael Cox. The song became her first solo charting single on the Billboard Hot 100, her first Radio No. 1 single, and reached number 3 on R&B/Hip-Hop Airplay. On March 31, 2022, she appeared on the Dreamville compilation D-Day: A Gangsta Grillz Mixtape, on the songs "Coming Down" and "Blackberry Sap". On August 12, Ari Lennox released her second single, "Hoodie", and announced the title and release date for her second studio album, Age/Sex/Location. On August 31, she released the surprise EP Away Message, including the single "Queen Space" featuring Summer Walker.

On April 24, 2025, Ari Lennox officially left Dreamville Records after months of conflicts with the label, remaining an Interscope Records artist.

On January 23, 2026, Ari Lennox released her third studio album Vacancy, her first album since her departure from Dreamville Records.

== Artistry ==
Ari Lennox describes her own voice as "vulnerable but soulful; imperfect but pretty". Her voice has been compared to Erykah Badu. Referencing her artistry, she explains: "Sometimes women are put in this box where we're only supposed to talk about certain things, I want to be braver and riskier. I think people want to hear that kind of honesty and frankness." Ari Lennox said in multiple interviews that she is inspired by 90s and 2000s R&B singers such as Mariah Carey, Erykah Badu, D'Angelo, Mya, Bilal, Whitney Houston, Aaliyah, Lauryn Hill, Amerie, Ciara, SWV, Mary J Blige, Toni Braxton, among many others, and soul singer Minnie Riperton. In an interview with The Fader, she also mentioned her admiration of Kanye West and how she found multiple other artists through him. The Gateway described Ari Lennox's sound as "successfully blends individual slices of classic Motown, modern R&B, and new-age soul into one seamless product."

== Discography ==
- Shea Butter Baby (2019)
- Age/Sex/Location (2022)
- Vacancy (2026)

== Filmography ==
Film and television
Year	Title	Role	Notes	Ref.
2019	Dreamville Presents: Revenge	Herself	Documentary	
2021	The Game	Herself	Episode: "White Party. White People. White Lies."	

== Tours ==
Headlining

- Shea Butter Baby Tour (2019)
- Age/Sex/Location Tour (2023)
- Vacancy Tour (2026)

Supporting

- 4 Your Eyez Only Tour (J. Cole) (2017)
- From East Atlanta with Love Tour (6LACK) (2018)
- Cuz I Love You Too Tour (Lizzo) (2019)
- Nostalgia Tour (Rod Wave) (2023)

== Awards and nominations ==
Award	Year	Category	Nominee(s)	Result	Ref.
Grammy Awards	2019	Best Rap Album	Revenge of the Dreamers III	Nominated	
Soul Train Music Awards	2019	Best R&B/Soul Female Artist	Herself	Nominated	
Soul Train Music Awards	2019	Album/Mixtape of the Year	Shea Butter Baby	Nominated	
Soul Train Music Awards	2019	Best Collaboration Performance	"Shea Butter Baby" (with J. Cole)	Nominated	
NAACP Image Awards	2020	Outstanding Duo, Group or Collaboration	"Shea Butter Baby" (with J. Cole)	Nominated	
NAACP Image Awards	2020	Outstanding New Artist	Herself	Nominated	
South African Hip Hop Awards	2021	Best Video	"Black & White" (with Nasty C) (Directed by Kyle White)	Nominated	
NAACP Image Awards	2022	Outstanding Female Artist	Herself	Nominated	
Soul Train Music Awards	2022	Best R&B/Soul Female Artist	Herself	Nominated	
Soul Train Music Awards	2022	Album of the Year	Away Message	Nominated	
Soul Train Music Awards	2022	Song of the Year	"Pressure"	Nominated	
Soul Train Music Awards	2022	Video of the Year	"Pressure"	Nominated	
Soul Train Music Awards	2022	The Ashford & Simpson Songwriter's Award	"Pressure"	Nominated	
Soul Train Music Awards	2022	Best Dance Performance	"Pressure"	Nominated	
NAACP Image Awards	2023	Outstanding Female Artist	Herself	Nominated	
NAACP Image Awards	2023	Outstanding Album	Age/Sex/Location	Nominated	
Soul Train Music Awards	2023	Album of the Year	Age/Sex/Location	Nominated	
Soul Train Music Awards	2023	Best R&B/Soul Female Artist	Herself	Nominated	
BET Awards	2025	Best Female R&B/Pop Artist	Herself	Nominated	
BET Awards	2026	Best Female R&B/Pop Artist	Herself	Nominated	
