= Cubeatz production discography =

Production discography

The discography of German hip hop record production duo, Cubeatz. It includes a list of songs produced, co-produced and remixed by year, artists, album and title.

== Singles produced ==
List of singles as either producer or co-producer, with selected chart positions and certifications, showing year released, performing artists and album name
Title	Year	Peak chart positions								Certifications	Album
Title	Year	US	US R&B/HH	US Rap	AUS	CAN	GER	NZ	UK	Certifications	Album
"R.I.C.O." (Meek Mill featuring Drake)	2015	40	14	9	—	48	—	—	—	RIAA: 2× Platinum	Dreams Worth More Than Money
"Summer Sixteen" (Drake)	2016	6	1	—	25	—	97	— (Note: "Summer Sixteen" did not enter the NZ Top 40 Singles Chart, but peaked at number six on the NZ Heatseeker chart.)	23	RIAA: Platinum; BPI: Silver	Non-album single
"That Part" (Schoolboy Q featuring Kanye West)	2016	40	13	8	—	—	51	— (Note: "That Part" did not enter the NZ Top 40 Singles Chart, but peaked at number six on the NZ Heatseeker chart.)	—	RIAA: 2× Platinum	Blank Face LP
"Spazz" (Dreezy)	2016	—	—	—	—	—	—	—	—		No Hard Feelings
"No Shopping" (French Montana featuring Drake)	2016	36	12	8	—	25	—	—	—	RIAA: Platinum	MC4 and Montana
"Ballin" (Juicy J featuring Kanye West)	2016	—	—	—	—	—	—	—	—		Non-album singles
"Down" (Lionaire featuring Kelvyn Colt and Alista Marq)	2016	—	—	—	—	—	—	—	—		Non-album singles
"No Heart" (21 Savage with Metro Boomin)	2016	43	17	12	—	79	—	—	—	RIAA: 2× Platinum; MC: Platinum	Savage Mode
"Goosebumps" (Travis Scott featuring Kendrick Lamar)	2016	32	21	13	56	—	—	—	90	RIAA: 5× Platinum; BPI: Silver; MC: Gold; SNEP: Gold	Birds in the Trap Sing McKnight
"Drugs" (August Alsina)	2017	—	—	—	—	—	—	—	—		Non-album single
"Tunnel Vision" (Kodak Black)	2017	6	4	2	—	17	—	—	—	RIAA: Platinum	Painting Pictures
"No Frauds" (Nicki Minaj with Drake and Lil Wayne)	2017	14	8	5	58	25	95	— (Note: "No Frauds" did not enter the NZ Top 40 Singles Chart, but peaked at number three on the NZ Heatseeker Singles Chart.)	49	MC: Gold	Non-album single
"When I Die" (Jay Prince featuring Axlfolie)	2017	—	—	—	—	—	—	—	—		Late Summers
"Shake It Up" (G-Eazy featuring E-40, MadeinTYO and 24hrs)	2017	—	—	—	—	—	—	—	—		Non-album single
"Headlock" (Cousin Stizz featuring Offset)	2017	—	—	—	—	—	—	—	—		One Night Only
"Hasta Luego" (JID)	2017	—	—	—	—	—	—	—	—		DiCaprio 2
"4 AM" (2 Chainz featuring Travis Scott)	2017	55	24	—	—	—	—	—	—	RIAA: 2× Platinum	Pretty Girls Like Trap Music
"Tango (Go)" (Preme)	2017	—	—	—	—	—	—	—	—		Light of Day
"Flipmode" (Fabolous with Chris Brown and Velous)	2017	—	—	—	—	—	—	—	—		Non-album single
"Can't Hang" (Preme featuring PartyNextDoor)	2017	—	—	—	—	—	—	—	—		Light of Day
"MotorSport" (Migos with Nicki Minaj and Cardi B)	2017	6	3	3	73	12	—	— (Note: "MotorSport" did not enter the NZ Top 40 Singles Chart, but peaked at number two on the NZ Heatseeker Singles Chart.)	49	RIAA: Gold	Culture II
"Whohasit" (Nessly featuring Ski Mask the Slump God)	2018	—	—	—	—	—	—	—	—		Wildflower
"Help a Bitch Out" (Snow Tha Product featuring O.T. Genasis)	2018	—	—	—	—	—	—	—	—		Non-album singles
"8AM" (EMP)	2018	—	—	—	—	—	—	—	—		Non-album singles
"Yeah Yeah" (1017 Eskimo, Hoodrich Pablo Juan and Yung Mal featuring Gucci Mane)	2018	—	—	—	—	—	—	—	—		Non-album singles
"SSP" (Dice Soho featuring Ty Dolla Sign and Desiigner)	2018	—	—	—	—	—	—	—	—		You Could Have
"Bring It Back" (Rich the Kid)	2018	—	—	—	—	—	—	—	—		Non-album single
"Tati" (6ix9ine featuring DJ Spinking)	2018	46	23	—	—	—	—	— (Note: "Tati" did not enter the NZ Top 40 Singles Chart, but peaked at number eight on the NZ Heatseeker Singles Chart.)	100		Dummy Boy
"Programs" (Mac Miller)	2018	—	—	—	—	—	—	—	—		Non-album single
"Fefe" (6ix9ine featuring Nicki Minaj and Murda Beatz)	2018	4	3	3	52	4	16	3	35	MC: Gold	Dummy Boy and Queen
"Nephew" (Smokepurpp featuring Lil Pump)	2018	— (Note: "Nephew" did not enter the Billboard Hot 100, but peaked at number 5 on the Bubbling Under Hot 100 chart, which acts as an extension to the Hot 100.)	—	—	—	—	—	—	—		Non-album single
"Sicko Mode" (Travis Scott)	2018	1	1	1	6	3	43	7	9	ARIA: 4× Platinum; BPI: Platinum; GLF: Gold; MC: 2× Platinum; RIAA: 5× Platinum; RMNZ: 2× Platinum	Astroworld
"Everybody Dies" (Logic)	2018	— (Note: "Everybody Dies" did not enter the Billboard Hot 100, but peaked at number 22 on the Bubbling Under Hot 100 Singles chart.)	— (Note: "Everybody Dies" did not enter the Billboard Hot R&B/Hip-Hop Songs chart, but peaked at number nine on the Bubbling Under R&B/Hip-Hop Singles chart.)	—	—	—	— (Note: "Everybody Dies" did not enter the NZ Top 40 Singles Chart, but peaked at number 37 on the NZ Hot Singles Chart.)	—	—		YSIV
"No Budget" (Kid Ink featuring Rich the Kid)	2018	—	—	—	—	—	—	—	—		Missed Calls
"Chi Chi" (Trey Songz featuring Chris Brown)	2019	—	—	—	—	—	—	—	—		TBA
"PGP" (Booba)	2019	—	—	—	—	—	—	—	—		TBA
"I" (Lil Skies)	2019	39	17	15	—	51	—	—	93	MC: Gold; RIAA: Platinum	Shelby
"No Idea" (Don Toliver)	2019	48	16	—	43	19	86	32	39	RIAA: Platinum	Heaven or Hell
"100 Shooters" (Future featuring Meek Mill and Doe Boy)	2019	—	—	—	—	—	—	—	—	RIAA: Gold	High Off Life
"Melee" (Tory Lanez)	2019	—	—	—	—	—	—	—	—		Non-album single
"Costa Rica" (Dreamville featuring Bas, JID, Guapdad 4000, Reese Laflare, Jace, Mez, Smokepurpp, Buddy and Ski Mask the Slump God)	2019	75	30	—	—	—	—	—	—	RIAA: Gold	Revenge of the Dreamers III
"Oh Ok" (Lil Gotit)	2019	—	—	—	—	—	—	—	—		Non-album single
"London to 1800" (Bexey with Jackboy)	2019	—	—	—	—	—	—	—	—		Non-album single
"2 At a Time" (A1)	2019	—	—	—	—	—	—	—	—		TBA
"Virgil Discount" (T.R.U. with 2 Chainz and Skooly)	2020	—	—	—	—	—	—	—	—		No Face No Case and Nobody Likes Me
"Contact" (Wiz Khalifa featuring Tyga)	2020	—	—	—	—	—	—	—	—		The Saga of Wiz Khalifa
"It's Whatever" (Smokepurpp)	2020	—	—	—	—	—	—	—	—		Florida Jit
"Vacation" (Tyga)	2020	— (Note: "Vacation" did not enter the Billboard Hot 100, but peaked at number 23 on the Bubbling Under Hot 100 chart.)	—	—	—	—	—	—	—		TBA
"Paranoia / #1 Stunna" (Fxxxxy)	2020	—	—	—	—	—	—	—	—		TBA
"Crocodile Tears" (Cousin Stizz)	2020	—	—	—	—	—	—	—	—		TBA
"12 Problems" (Rapsody)	2020	—	—	—	—	—	—	—	—		Reprise
"Bop It" (Fivio Foreign featuring Polo G)	2020	—	—	—	—	—	—	—	—		TBA
"Back" (Jeezy featuring Yo Gotti)	2020	—	—	—	—	—	—	—	—		The Recession 2
"Black Mask" (Jay Gwuapo featuring Pop Smoke)	2020	—	—	—	—	—	—	—	—		TBA
"What That Speed Bout!?" (Mike Will Made-It featuring Nicki Minaj and YoungBoy Never Broke Again)	2020	35	—	—	—	76	—	—	—		Michael
"Period" (Smoove'L)	2020	—	—	—	—	—	—	—	—		Ice Cups and Shootouts
"Wish List" (Yo Gotti)	2020	—	—	—	—	—	—	—	—		TBA
"Heavy" (Nigo with Lil Uzi Vert)	2022	— (Note: "Heavy" did not enter the Billboard Hot 100, but peaked at number 14 on the Bubbling Under Hot 100 chart.)	—	—	—	—	—	—	—		I Know Nigo!
"MVP" (FaZe Kaysan with Sheck Wes and Fivio Foreign)	2022	—	—	—	—	—	—	—	—		TBA
"Big League" (Yo Gotti with Moneybagg Yo, CMG The Label featuring Mozzy and Lil Poppa)	2022	—	—	—	—	—	—	—	—		TBA
"Distraction" (Polo G)	2022	39	7	7	—	31	—	7	61		TBA
"Fear Not" (Lecrae)	2022	—	—	—	—	—	—	—	—		Church Clothes 4
"—" denotes a recording that did not chart or was not released in that territory.	2022										

== 2011 ==
=== Fard – Invictus ===
- 07. "Einsam" (produced with Beatzeps)
- 08. "S.O.S." (produced with Beatzeps)
- 10. "Dann Bist Du Häuptling" (produced with Beatzeps)
- 16. "Erinnerungen" (produced with Beatzeps)
- 17. "60 Terrorbars Las Vegas" (produced with Beatzeps and Joshimixu)

=== Bosca – Fighting Society ===
- 01. "Intro"
- 03. "Zeilen Die Für Dich Rappen"
- 05. "Tausende Stunden"
- 06. "So Mächtig"
- 08. "Bosca The Heat"
- 09. "Scheinwelt"
- 11. "Doch Wieder"
- 12. "Endmusik" (featuring Vega)
- 13. "Kannst Du Sehen?"
- 16. "Alles Gesagt"

== 2012 ==
=== Vega – Vincent ===
- 01. "Vincent Ist Da"
- 03. "So Weit Weg"
- 04. "Feuer"

=== Farid Bang – Der letzte Tag deines Lebens ===
- 16. "Weißer Krieger" (featuring L Nino) (produced with B-Case)

=== Haftbefehl – Kanackiş ===
- 02. "An Alle Bloxx" (produced with Beatzeps)

== 2013 ==
=== Timeless – 00:00 ===
- 07. "Der Morgen Danach" (featuring Vega)

== 2015 ==
=== Vega – Kaos ===
- 03. "1312"
- 05. "Hip-Hop & Rap"

=== Farid Bang – Asphalt Massaka 3 ===
- 12. "FDM"

=== KC Rebell – Fata Morgana ===
- 08. "Porzellan" (featuring Maxim) (produced with Joshimixu and Abaz)

=== G-Eazy ===
- 00. "Oh Well" (produced with Illmind)

=== Joell Ortiz – Human ===
- 01. "Human (Intro)" (produced with Illmind)
- 03. "I Just Might" (produced with Illmind)
- 04. "My Niggas" (produced with Illmind)
- 10. "Bad Santa" (featuring Jared Evan) (produced with Illmind)

=== PA Sports – Eiskalter Engel ===
- 17. "Am Ziel"

=== Hanybal ===
- 00. "Money"

=== Fard ===
- 08. "HuckleberryFinnPhase (Mezzanin)"

== 2016 ==
=== Lil Uzi Vert – Lil Uzi Vert vs. the World ===
- 04. "Grab the Wheel" (produced with Don Cannon)

=== Drake – Views ===
- 05. "Hype" (produced with Boi-1da, Nineteen85 and The Beat Bully)

=== Luu Breeze – Something in the Shade ===
- 06. "NuhFaceNuhTime" (produced with Daniel Worthy)

=== Juicy J and Wiz Khalifa – TGOD Mafia: Rude Awakening ===
- 06. "I See It I Want It" (produced with TM88)
- 09. "Bossed Up" (produced with TM88)
- 10. "She in Love" (produced with TM88)
- 14. "Stay the Same" (produced with TM88)
- 16. "Cell Ready" (produced with TM88)

=== Tru Life ===
- 00. "Bag for It" (featuring Rick Ross and Velous) (produced with Myles William)

=== Snoop Dogg – Coolaid ===
- 05. "Coolaid Man" (produced with Cardo)

=== PartyNextDoor and Jeremih ===
- 00. "Like Dat" (featuring Lil Wayne) (produced with Murda Beatz)

=== Jeremih – Late Nights: Europe ===
- 04. "Lebanon" (produced with Soundz)
- 09. "Stockholm" (produced with Soundz)

=== PartyNextDoor ===
- 00. "Buzzin" (featuring Lil Yachty) (produced with Murda Beatz)

=== Lil Uzi Vert – The Perfect Luv Tape ===
- 09. "Ronda (winners)" (produced with Metro Boomin)

=== Joell Ortiz ===
- 00. "Talk My Shit" (produced with Illmind)

=== Travis Scott ===
- 00. "Black Mass" (produced with Murda Beatz)

=== Travis Scott – Birds in the Trap Sing McKnight ===
- 03. "Coordinate" (featuring Blac Youngsta) (produced with TM88)
- 04. "Through the Late Night" (featuring Kid Cudi) (produced with Cardo)
- 07. "Sweet Sweet" (produced with Murda Beatz and Mike Dean)

=== Gucci Mane – Woptober ===
- 11. "Hi-Five" (produced with Metro Boomin)

=== Meek Mill – DC4 ===
- 07. "Lights Out" (featuring Don Q) (produced with Infamous Rell)
- 09. "Offended" (featuring Young Thug and 21 Savage) (produced with OZ and Murda Beatz)

=== Kool Savas – Essahdamus ===
- 13. "On & On" (featuring PA Sports, Gentleman and Vega)

=== Travis Scott ===
- 00. "RaRa" (featuring Lil Uzi Vert) (produced with TM88)

=== 24hrs – 12:AM ===
- 03. "Monster Truck" (produced with Murda Beatz)

=== Rick Ross ===
- 00. "No U-Turns" (produced with Murda Beatz)

=== Juicy J – #MustBeNice ===
- 05. "Lotto" (produced with TM88)
- 06. "Whatcha Gone Do" (produced with TM88)
- 12. "Panties" (featuring Jeremih) (produced with TM88)

=== Kid Ink – RSS2 ===
- 02. "Before the Checks" (featuring Casey Veggies) (produced with Murda Beatz)

=== Young Thug ===
- 00. "I Might" (featuring 21 Savage) (produced with Murda Beatz)

=== Shindy – Dreams ===
- 12. "Zahlen" (produced with Shindy and OZ)
- 13. "Laas Abi Skit" (produced with Shindy, Djorkaeff and Beatzarre)

=== Murda Beatz – Keep God First ===
- 04. "More" (featuring PartyNextDoor and Quavo) (produced with Murda Beatz)
- 11. "Brown Money" (featuring Jay Whiss) (produced with Murda Beatz and OZ)
- 12. "9 Times Out of 10" (featuring Ty Dolla Sign) (produced with Murda Beatz)

=== Skeme – Paranoia ===
- 03. "Obession" (produced with Don Cannon)
- 04. "2X" (produced with Don Cannon)

=== Gucci Mane – The Return of East Atlanta Santa ===
- 05. "Stutter" (produced with Murda Beatz)
- 08. "Yet" (produced with Murda Beatz)

== 2017 ==
=== PnB Rock – GTTM: Goin Thru the Motions ===
- 14. "Stand Back" (featuring A Boogie wit da Hoodie) (produced with Murda Beatz)

=== Wifisfuneral – When Hell Falls ===
- 05. "Hunnits, Fifties" (featuring Yung Bans) (produced with Murda Beatz)

=== Sean Leon – I Think You've Gone Mad (Or the Sins of the Father) ===
- 11. "Favourite Rapper / Hundred Million Religion" (produced with Bijan Amir)

=== Future – Hndrxx ===
- 01. "My Collection" (produced with Metro Boomin)
- 17. "Sorry" (produced with Metro Boomin)

=== Profit ===
- 00. "Ain't Rich Yet" (featuring Dave East) (produced with Cardiak)

=== Drake – More Life ===
- 02. "No Long Talk" (featuring Giggs) (produced with Murda Beatz)
- 11. "Portland" (featuring Quavo and Travis Scott) (produced with Murda Beatz)

=== King Z3us – King Z3us ===
- 03. "Commas" (produced with Illmind)

=== Juicy J – Gas Face ===
- 09. "Leanin" (featuring Chris Brown and Quavo) (produced with Murda Beatz)

=== Rich the Kid ===
- 00. "Ain't Ready" (featuring Jay Critch and Famous Dex) (produced with Boi-1da and Vinylz)

=== Gucci Mane – Droptopwop ===
- 02. "Tho" (produced with Metro Boomin)
- 04. "Helpless" (produced with Metro Boomin)
- 06. "Finesse the Plug" (Interlude) (produced with Metro Boomin)
- 07. "Dance with the Devil" (produced with Metro Boomin)

=== A. Chal – On Gaz ===
- 06. "Past Chick" (featuring Axlfolie) (produced with Daniel Worthy)

=== PartyNextDoor ===
- 02. "Don't Tell Me" (featuring Jeremih) (produced with Cardo and Yung Exclusive)

=== 21 Savage – Issa Album ===
- 13. "Whole Lot" (featuring Young Thug) (produced with Metro Boomin)

=== AR-Ab ===
- 00. "No Smoke" (featuring Velous) (produced with Myles William)

=== French Montana – Jungle Rules ===
- 11. "Push Up" (produced with Murda Beatz)

=== Nav – Perfect Timing ===
- 05. "Held Me Down" (produced with Metro Boomin and Nav)
- 07. "Did You See Nav?" (produced with Metro Boomin)
- 013. "Need Some" (featuring Gucci Mane) (produced with Metro Boomin)

=== Bebe Rexha – All Your Fault: Pt. 2 ===
- 01. "That's It" (featuring Gucci Mane and 2 Chainz) (produced with Murda Beatz)

=== Vory – Lucky Me ===
- 04. "9.22" (produced with Louis Bell)

=== Kodak Black – Project Baby 2 ===
- 03. "Roll in Peace" (featuring XXXTentacion) (produced with London on da Track)

=== Lil Uzi Vert – Luv Is Rage 2 ===
- 04. "No Sleep Leak" (produced with Don Cannon)

=== Brain – I'm Brain ===
- 03. "Whippin' It Up" (featuring Lil Dicky) (produced with Lil Dicky, Eestbound and OZ)

=== Gucci Mane – Mr. Davis ===
- 01. "Work in Progress (Intro)" (produced with Murda Beatz)
- 15. "Jump Out the Whip (Featuring A$AP Rocky)(Produced with Metro Boomin)

=== Maino – Party & Pain ===
- 04. "Bag Talk" (featuring Dave East and Jaquae) (produced with Myles William)

=== 21 Savage, Offset and Metro Boomin – Without Warning ===
- 04. "My Choppa Hate Niggas" (performed by 21 Savage and Metro Boomin) (produced with Metro Boomin)
- 09. "Still Serving" (produced with Metro Boomin)

=== 88Glam – 88Glam ===
- 08. "Give n Go" (produced with Murda Beatz and WondaGurl)

=== Dave East – Karma ===
- 16. "Feeling a Way" (featuring D Jones) (produced with Maaly Raw)

=== Lil Duke – Uberman 2 ===
- 03. "Double" (featuring Offset) (produced with Southside)

=== DRAM – Big Baby DRAM ===
- 21. "Good Thang" (featuring Casey Veggies) (produced with Cardo)

=== Quality Control – Quality Control: Control the Streets Volume 1 ===
- 19. "Thick & Pretty" (performed by Quality Control with Migos) (produced with Murda Beatz)

=== XXXTentacion – A Ghetto Christmas Carol ===
- 01. "A Ghetto Christmas Carol" (produced with Ronny J)

=== G-Eazy – The Beautiful & Damned ===
- 02. "Pray for Me" (produced with Boi-1da)

=== Travis Scott and Quavo – Huncho Jack, Jack Huncho ===
- 07. "Go" (produced with Vinylz)
- 10. "Moon Rock" (produced with Vinylz)
- 12. "Where U From" (produced with Cardo)

=== Famous Dex – Read About It ===
- 01. "Up" (featuring Ski Mask the Slump God and Reggie Mills) (produced with Ronny J)

== 2018 ==
=== Rich Brian – Amen ===
- 05. "Attention" (featuring Offset) (produced with Austin Powerz, Bkorn and Rich Brian)

=== Young Sizzle – Trap Ye: Season 2 ===
- 15. "Murder They Wrote Pt. II" (produced with Gezin and Larry David)

=== Kendrick Lamar and various artists – Black Panther: The Album ===
- 01. "Black Panther" (performed by Kendrick Lamar) (produced with Kendrick Lamar, Sounwave and Matt Schaeffer)
- 07. "Paramedic!" (performed by SOB X RBE) (produced with DJ Dahi and Sounwave)
- 13. "Big Shot" (performed by Kendrick Lamar and Travis Scott) (produced with Cardo, Sounwave and Matt Schaeffer)

=== FKi 1st – Good Gas ===
- 01. "Good Gas" (featuring MadeinTYO and Uno The Activist) (produced with FKi 1st)

=== Ronny J – OMGRonny ===
- 05. "Costa Rica" (featuring Ski Mask The Slump God) (produced with Ronny J)

=== Nessly – Wildflower ===
- 11. "Sorry Not Sorry" (produced with TM88 and Take a Daytrip)

=== Vic Mensa ===
- 00. "Dim Sum" (with Valee) (produced with Apex Martin and Mike Dean)

=== Cardi B – Invasion of Privacy ===
- 13. "I Do" (featuring SZA) (produced with Murda Beatz)

=== Smokepurpp and Murda Beatz – Bless Yo Trap ===
- 09. "Ways" (produced with Murda Beatz)
- 10. "For the Gang" (produced with Murda Beatz)

=== Evander Griiim – Raices ===
- 09. "Flavor" (produced with NES)

=== Ski Mask the Slump God – Beware the Book of Eli ===
- 04. "Coolest Monkey in the Jungle" (featuring SahBabii) (produced with Murda Beatz)

=== Ty Dolla Sign – Beach House 3 ===
- 26. "Simple" (featuring Yo Gotti) (produced with Smash David and Hitmaka)

=== Nick Grant – Dreamin' Out Loud ===
- 06. "Bleu Cheese" (produced with Supah Mario)

=== Lil Skies ===
- 00. "World Rage" (produced with Danny Wolf and Otxhello)

=== G-Eazy – The Vault ===
- 03. "Power" (featuring Nef the Pharaoh and P-Lo) (produced with Vinylz and Allen Ritter)

=== Zoey Dollaz – Who Don't Like Dollaz 2 ===
- 03. "Moonwalk" (featuring Moneybagg Yo) (produced with Ronny J)

=== Future and various artists – Superfly ===
- 12. "Money Train" (performed by Future featuring Young Thug and Gunna) (produced with Wheezy)

=== Wifisfuneral – Ethernet ===
- 03. "Genesis" (produced with Ronny J)

=== Jay Rock – Redemption ===
- 09. "Troopers" (produced with Cardo)

=== Wiz Khalifa – Rolling Papers 2 ===
- 09. "Karate" (featuring Chevy Woods) (produced with TM88)

=== Hoodrich Pablo Juan – Hoodwolf 2 ===
- 02. "Bitch Nigga" (produced with Danny Wolf and Dilip)
- 10. "Vacation" (featuring Lil Duke) (produced with Danny Wolf and Otxhello)
- 11. "Not To Be Trusted" (produced with Danny Wolf and Dilip)

=== G Herbo – Swervo ===
- 04. "FoReal" (produced with Southside)
- 12. "Letter" (produced with Southside)

=== Jazz Cartier – Fleurever ===
- 03. "VVS" (featuring Ktoe) (produced with WondaGurl)

=== Travis Scott – Astroworld ===
- 03. "Sicko Mode" (produced with OZ, Hit-Boy, Tay Keith, Rogét Chahayed and Mike Dean)
- 05. "Stop Trying To Be God" (produced with Travis Scott, J Beatzz and Mike Dean)
- 10. "NC-17" (produced with Boi-1da, Allen Ritter and Mike Dean)

=== Baka Not Nice – 4 Milli ===
- 04. "Dope Game" (produced with Boi-1da)

=== Young Nudy – SlimeBall 3 ===
- 04. "InDaStreets" (produced with Maaly Raw)

=== Comethazine – Bawksee ===
- 09. "Bring Out Dat Bag" (featuring Lil Yachty) (produced with Ronny J)

=== Bia – Nice Girls Finish Last: Cuidado ===
- 02. "Hollywood" (produced with Murda Beatz)

=== Young Thug – On the Rvn ===
- 01. "On The Run" (featuring Offset) (produced with London on da Track)

=== Quavo – Quavo Huncho ===
- 01. "Biggest Alley Oop" (produced with 30 Roc)
- 04. "Flip the Switch" (featuring Drake) (produced with Wheezy and Keyyz)
- 11. "Fuck 12" (featuring Offset) (produced with Earl the Pearll)

=== City Morgue – City Morgue Vol 1: Hell or High Water ===
- 09. "Snow on Tha Bluff" (produced with Ronny J)

=== Future and Juice Wrld – Wrld on Drugs ===
- 08. "Different" (featuring Yung Bans) (produced with Wheezy)

=== Lil Yachty – Nuthin' 2 Prove ===
- 08. "Different" (featuring Lil Baby) (produced with Earl the Pearll)

=== MihTy – MihTy ===
- 09. "Lie 2 Me" (produced with Prince Chrishan and Hitmaka)

=== Vince Staples – FM! ===
- 03. "Don't Get Chipped" (produced with Kenny Beats)

=== Takeoff – The Last Rocket ===
- 04. "Vacation" (produced with Murda Beatz)

=== Tee Grizzley – Still My Moment ===
- 09. "Bitches on Bitches" (featuring Lil Pump) (produced with J Gramm)

=== 88Glam – 88Glam2 ===
- 10. "Racks" (featuring Gunna) (produced with Maaly Raw)

=== Jaden Smith – The Sunset Tapes: A Cool Tape Story ===
- 06. "Better Things" (produced with Fuse)

=== Meek Mill – Championships ===
- 14. "Pay You Back" (featuring 21 Savage) (produced with Wheezy)

=== Ski Mask the Slump God – Stokeley ===
- 11. "Faucet Failure" (produced with ChaseTheMoney)

=== XXXTentacion – Skins ===
- 09. "I Don't Let Go" (produced with John Cunningham)

=== Gucci Mane – Evil Genius ===
- 15. "Hard Feelings" (produced with Southside)

== 2019 ==
=== Future – The Wizrd ===
- 07. "Call the Coroner" (produced with TM88)

=== G Herbo – Still Swervin ===
- 07. "Bug" (produced with Southside)
- 10. "Do Yo Sh!t" (produced with DY)
- 11. "Never Scared" (featuring Juice Wrld) (produced with Southside and DY)
- 14. "Wilt Chamberlain" (produced with DY)

=== Lil Pump – Harverd Dropout ===
- 11. "Vroom Vroom Vroom" (produced with Ronny J)

=== Offset – Father of 4 ===
- 12. "Clout" (featuring Cardi B) (produced with Southside)

=== DaBaby – Baby on Baby ===
- 04. "Pony" (produced with Pyrex)

=== Zacari – Run Wild Run Free ===
- 05. "Young & Invincible" (featuring Lil Yachty) (produced with Teddy Walton and IAMNOBODI)

=== Lil Gotit – Crazy But It's True ===
- 05. "Drip School" (featuring Lil Durk) (produced with Wheezy)

=== Nav – Bad Habits ===
- 02. "I'm Ready" (produced with WondaGurl)

=== Young Chop – Don't Sleep ===
- 05. "Gimme That" (produced with Don Cannon)

=== Travis Scott and Gucci Mane ===
- 00. "Murda" (produced with Murda Beatz)

=== Offset and 21 Savage ===
- 00. "Hethen" (produced with Metro Boomin)

=== KGibbs ===
- 00. "DaVille" (featuring Lil Uzi Vert) (produced with Waves and Loner)

=== Logic – Confessions of a Dangerous Mind ===
- 07. "Pardon My Ego" (produced with 6ix)
- 11. "Cocaine" (produced with 6ix)

=== YG – 4Real 4Real ===
- 02. "Bottle Service" (produced with Mustard)

=== Luci Lives – My Shitty Mixtape ===
- 05. "Scene Queen"

=== Lil Keed – Long Live Mexico ===
- 09. "Snake" (produced with Pyrex)

=== Gucci Mane – Delusions of Grandeur ===
- 03. "Special" (with Anuel AA) (produced with Murda Beatz)

=== Jaden Smith – Erys ===
- 08. "Got It" (produced with Tay Keith)

=== Baby Keem – Die for My Bitch ===
- 11. "Buss Her Up" (produced with Baby Keem)
- 14. "Apologize" (produced with Baby Keem)

=== Quality Control – Control the Streets, Volume 2 ===
- 07. "I Suppose" (with Takeoff) (produced with DJ Durel)
- 09. "Pink Toes" (with Offset and DaBaby featuring Gunna) (produced with Metro Boomin and Southside)
- 16. "Virgil" (with Quavo) (produced with DJ Durel)
- 22. "Come On" (with City Girls and Saweetie featuring DJ Durel) (produced with DJ Durel)

=== Dame D.O.L.L.A. – Big D.O.L.L.A. ===
- 07. "Ricky Bobby" (produced with Nonstop da Hitman)

=== Danny Wolf – Night of the Wolf ===
- 04. "Feel the Vibe" (featuring Lil Skies) (produced with Danny Wolf and Otxhello)
- 07. "Wicked" (featuring Yung Bans) (produced with Danny Wolf and Dilip)

=== Cam Ro – No Gearz ===
- 03. "Bittersweet" (produced with X-808)

=== NLE Choppa ===
- 00. "Always Workin" (produced with Smash David and OG Parker)

=== Ameer Vann – Emmanuel ===
- 03. "Glock 19" (produced with Cool & Dre)

=== Lil Mosey – Certified Hitmaker ===
- 11. "Space Coupe" (produced with Royce David)

=== Swavay – Pure Pack ===
- 02. "Hood Dreamz" (produced with Pyrex and Nebu Kiniza)

=== Fabolous – Summertime Shootout 3: Coldest Summer Ever ===
- 03. "Talk To Me Nicely" (featuring Meek Mill) (produced with Maaly Raw)

=== Young Thug – So Much Fun ===
- 02. "Hop Off a Jet" (featuring Travis Scott) (produced with Wheezy)

=== AJ Tracey – AJ Tracey ===
- 20. "Zelda" (featuring SahBabii and Safe) (produced with Maaly Raw)

=== DY Krazy – DY Went Krazy ===
- 07. "Foes (featuring SBG Kemo and Bump J) (produced with DY)

=== Fat Joe and Dre – Family Ties ===
- 07. "Big Splash" (featuring Remy Ma) (produced with Dre)

== 2020 ==
=== Yo Gotti – Untrapped ===
- 10. "Dopechella" (featuring Rick Ross) (produced with Southside)

=== Jay Whiss – Peace of Mind ===
- 01. "Don't Change on Me" (produced with Murda Beatz)
- 04. "Valet" (featuring Puffy L'z) (produced with Murda Beatz)

=== Blacc Zacc – Carolina Narco ===
- 05. "Coccy" (featuring Stunna 4 Vegas) (produced with Anthony Costley and June James)

=== Jucee Froot – Black Sheep ===
- 02. "Wristwork" (produced with Cool & Dre)

=== Jack Harlow – Sweet Action ===
- 03. "I Wanna See Some Ass" (featuring JetsonMade) (produced with JetsonMade)

=== Don Toliver – Heaven or Hell ===
- 04. "After Party" (produced with Sonny Digital, Mike Dean, Travis Scott and Nils)
- 11. "No Photos" (produced with WondaGurl)

=== Rich the Kid – Boss Man ===
- 10. "Easy" (produced with Axl)

=== Shindy – Byzantinische Rose ===
- 02. "Sony Pictures" (produced with OZ)

=== Jackboy – Jackboy ===
- 08. "Like a Million" (featuring Kodak Black) (produced with Tay Keith)

=== Future – High Off Life ===
- 05. "Ridin Strikers" (produced part 2 with ATL Jacob)
- 16. "Accepting My Flaws" (produced with Southside)

=== Aitch – Polaris ===
- 01. "Safe to Say" (produced with Kenny Beats)

=== City Girls – City on Lock ===
- 10. "Flewed Out" (featuring Lil Baby) (produced with Cheeze Beats)

=== YoungBoy Never Broke Again – Top ===
- 15. "Reaper's Child" (produced with VinnyForGood, Wallis Lane and Jack LoMastro)

=== Wiz Khalifa – The Saga of Wiz Khalifa ===
- 03. "On Top" (produced with Don Cannon)
- 05. "This Time Around" (produced with Don Cannon)

=== Yung Gravy – Gasanova ===
- 02. "Martha Stewart" (produced with J Gramm and Rance)

=== Doe Boy and Southside – Demons R Us ===
- 05. "Stimulus Check" (produced with Southside)
- 17. "Yesterday" (featuring Trippie Redd) (produced with Southside)

=== Nav – Emergency Tsunami ===
- 11. "Droppin Tears" (produced with Wheezy and Frost)

=== 2 Chainz – So Help Me God! ===
- 01. "Lambo Wrist" (produced with LilJuMadeDaBeat, StreetRunner and Tarik Azzouz)

=== Jack Harlow – Thats What They All Say ===
- 02. "Face of My City" (featuring Lil Baby) (produced with Sonny Digital)

=== Tony Pirrone – You Made Me This Way ===
- 02. "Bruce Wayne" (produced with Lucas Depetti)

== 2021 ==
=== Lil Skies – Unbothered ===
- 14. "Mhmmm" (produced with T-Minus)

=== Jay NGF – PercMode ===
- 03. "Yu Gi Oh" (produced with Nightfein)

=== Only the Family – Loyal Bros ===
- 15. "Toxic" (performed by JusBlow600) (produced with JD On Tha Track)

=== 21 Lil Harold – Larry ===
- 01. "Savage" (produced with Kid Hazel)

=== Lil Tjay – Destined 2 Win ===
- 09. "Go Crazy" (produced with 808Melo)

=== Conway the Machine – La Maquina ===
- 09. "Scatter Brain" (featuring Ludacris and JID) (produced with Don Cannon)

=== YSL Records – Slime Language 2 ===
- 11. "Pots N Pans" (featuring Lil Duke and Nav) (produced with Chase Davis)

=== YG and Mozzy – Kommunity Service ===
- 11. "Mad" (featuring Young M.A) (produced with Swish and Ambezza)

=== Migos – Culture III ===
- 12 "Jane" (produced with Carnage, Tay Keith and Nils)

=== G Herbo – 25 ===
- 01. "I Don't Wanna Die" (produced with Southside)
- 13. "Demands" (produced with Southside)

=== Rah Swish – Mayor of the Streets ===
- 07. "ILGAUSKAS" (produced with Sad Pony and Ben10k)

=== Beny Jr – Samurai ===
- 06. "Dvd Ting" (with El Guincho) (produced with El Guincho and Mantra)

=== OMB Bloodbath – Blood Sample ===
- 02. "Not Gang" (featuring EST Gee) (produced with Tay Keith)

=== Rose' Riley – Rose' Season ===
- 05. "Blood Brothers" (produced with Kid Hazel)

=== BMW Kenny – Fear The Deer ===
- 03. "All Star" (produced with BMW Kenny)

=== Dame D.O.L.L.A. – Different On Levels The Lord Allowed ===
- 05. "For Me" (featuring Derrick Milano) (produced with Section 8)

=== Kanye West – Donda ===
- 12. "Remote Control Pt 2" (produced with Kanye West, Digital Nas, Ojivolta, 88-Keys and Mike Dean)
- 22. "Remote Control" (produced with Kanye West, Digital Nas, Ojivolta, 88-Keys and Mike Dean)

=== Arca – Kick II ===
- 05. "Luna Llena" (produced with WondaGurl, Jenius and Arca)

=== Nardo Wick – Who Is Nardo Wick? ===
- 13. "Wicked Freestyle" (produced with Boi-1da, Leon Thomas III, Luis Baqué and EleBeatz)

== 2022 ==
=== Kodak Black – Back for Everything ===
- 04. "Smackers" (produced with London on da Track)

=== Lil Durk – 7220 ===
- 06. "Golden Child" (produced with Hitmaka, YC and Real Red)

=== Kreative Kidd – Live from CO ===
- 04. "Colorado Freestyle" (produced with Bypxr, Newrvge, DB! and Cloud)

=== Sean Paul – Scorcha ===
- 11. "Good Day" (produced with Jigzagula, Supa Dups and Sevn Thomas)

=== Drake – Honestly, Nevermind ===
- 14. "Jimmy Cooks" (featuring 21 Savage) (produced with Tay Keith, Vinylz and Tizzle)

=== Don Q – Corleone ===
- 03. "2 Tone AP" (featuring 42 Dugg) (produced with Kid Hazel)

=== Strick – The Machine, Vol. 3 ===
- 03. "Tuscan" (produced with Mikey Tussin and Duce)

== 2023 ==
=== Stray Kids – Rock-Star ===
- 0.2 "Lalalala" (produced with 3Racha, Versachoi and Luis Bacque)
