= Cubeatz =

German hip hop production and songwriting duo

- Also known as: Cuebeatz; Cue Beats
- Born: 15 March 1991 (age 35); Sindelfingen, Germany
- Genres: Hip hop; trap
- Occupations: Record producers; songwriters
- Instruments: Steinberg Cubase; Maschine
- Years active: 2008–present
- Labels: UMPG; Sony/ATV (former); BMI
- Members: Kevin Gomringer; Tim Gomringer

Cubeatz (sometimes stylized as CuBeatz) are a German hip hop production and songwriting duo from Hildrizhausen, consisting of twin brothers Kevin and Tim Gomringer. Originally embarking on their careers within German hip hop in 2008, they have since expanded and have been credited on releases for international hip hop artists such as Drake, Future, Gucci Mane, 21 Savage, Lil Uzi Vert, and Travis Scott, among others. Cubeatz are sample producers, who create loops, melodies and kits for the purpose of being sampled by other producers to utilize in a final beat.

== Early life ==
Kevin and Tim Gomringer were born as twin brothers on 15 March 1991 in Sindelfingen. They grew up in nearby Hildrizhausen, what Kevin described as a "forest village", where, for them, it was "rainy" and "lonely", which led them to build their craft, or, as Kevin says, "fantasy in their minds".

Their parents had a radio receiver and a CD player, with various "classic" records by Björk, U2, Michael Jackson, and more, which further helped them as inspiration to start making music. They started making beats with the DAW software Cubase, which led them to making their stage name "Cubeatz". In the late 2000s, they started putting their beats on YouTube.

Both brothers completed apprenticeships as merchants in wholesale and foreign trade and subsequently studied music at a private university in Stuttgart.

== Career ==
=== German hip hop ===
In 2008, they earned their first record with German rapper Vega. During this time, Cubeatz relied strongly on unlicensed samples, a practice they later said was only possible due to their produced songs staying relatively unnoticed at the time. They began producing for more rappers in Germany, such as Fard and PA Sports. Through Fard, they were connected with Haftbefehl, one of the bigger names in German hip hop at the time, producing the song "An alle Bloxx" on his 2012 album Kanackiş. They garnered attention in the German gangsta rap scene and began producing beats for other German rappers such as Summer Cem, KC Rebell or Farid Bang, eventually signing a publishing deal with Sony Music Publishing in Germany.

As their popularity grew, Cubeatz changed their production process to omit the use of samples and began playing all melodies by themselves. In a 2014 interview, they said they tried to position themselves more as "producers" instead of "beatmakers": "We used to finish the beats at home and then send out packages of five or six instrumentals. Today we take care of the complete production of an album."

=== International hip hop ===
In late 2014, a "friend" of them sent a composition of theirs to American record producer Vinylz, which, in mid-2015, evolved into the song "R.I.C.O." by rapper Meek Mill featuring Canadian rapper Drake, with additional production by American record producer Allen Ritter. Cubeatz explained that the R.I.C.O. placement opened multiple doors for them, such as being connected with American record producer Cardo, with whom they ended up working on multiple songs. Since then, they were able to send their "original samples" off to other major record producers such as Metro Boomin, Boi-1da, Tay Keith, Murda Beatz, and much more, gaining momentum in US hip hop production and garnering a lot of high-profile collaborations with Drake, Travis Scott, Future, 21 Savage, and Don Toliver, among others. Since 2014, their work mostly consists of composing their own melodies that they send off to be sampled by other producers.

In 2016, Cubeatz co-produced charting hits such as "Summer Sixteen" by Drake, "That Part" by Schoolboy Q featuring Kanye West, "No Shopping" by French Montana featuring Drake, "No Heart" by 21 Savage and Metro Boomin.

In 2017, they co-produced high charting singles such as "Tunnel Vision" by Kodak Black, "No Frauds" by Nicki Minaj, Drake and Lil Wayne and "MotorSport" by Migos, Nicki Minaj and Cardi B, and "A Ghetto Christmas Carol" by XXXTentacion.

In 2018, they co-produced "Sicko Mode" by Travis Scott, which peaked at number 1 on the Billboard Hot 100.

They have been nominated multiple times for a Grammy Award, winning once in 2019 for their work on Cardi B's album Invasion of Privacy.

== Style ==
Online magazine Pitchfork described Cubeatz' work in 2020 as "moody melodies with layers of effects".

== Production discography ==
List of singles as either producer or co-producer, with selected chart positions and certifications, showing year released, performing artists and album name
Title	Year	Peak chart positions								Certifications	Album
Title	Year	US	US R&B/HH	US Rap	AUS	CAN	GER	NZ	UK	Certifications	Album
"R.I.C.O." (Meek Mill featuring Drake)	2015	40	14	9	—	48	—	—	—	RIAA: 2× Platinum	Dreams Worth More Than Money
"Summer Sixteen" (Drake)	2016	6	1	—	25	—	97	— (Note: "Summer Sixteen" did not enter the NZ Top 40 Singles Chart, but peaked at number six on the NZ Heatseeker chart.)	23	RIAA: Platinum; BPI: Silver	Non-album single
"That Part" (Schoolboy Q featuring Kanye West)	2016	40	13	8	—	—	51	— (Note: "That Part" did not enter the NZ Top 40 Singles Chart, but peaked at number six on the NZ Heatseeker chart.)	—	RIAA: 2× Platinum	Blank Face LP
"Spazz" (Dreezy)	2016	—	—	—	—	—	—	—	—		No Hard Feelings
"No Shopping" (French Montana featuring Drake)	2016	36	12	8	—	25	—	—	—	RIAA: Platinum	MC4 and Montana
"Ballin" (Juicy J featuring Kanye West)	2016	—	—	—	—	—	—	—	—		Non-album singles
"Down" (Lionaire featuring Kelvyn Colt and Alista Marq)	2016	—	—	—	—	—	—	—	—		Non-album singles
"No Heart" (21 Savage with Metro Boomin)	2016	43	17	12	—	79	—	—	—	RIAA: 2× Platinum; MC: Platinum	Savage Mode
"Goosebumps" (Travis Scott featuring Kendrick Lamar)	2016	32	21	13	56	—	—	—	90	RIAA: 5× Platinum; BPI: Silver; MC: Gold; SNEP: Gold	Birds in the Trap Sing McKnight
"Drugs" (August Alsina)	2017	—	—	—	—	—	—	—	—		Non-album single
"Tunnel Vision" (Kodak Black)	2017	6	4	2	—	17	—	—	—	RIAA: Platinum	Painting Pictures
"No Frauds" (Nicki Minaj with Drake and Lil Wayne)	2017	14	8	5	58	25	95	— (Note: "No Frauds" did not enter the NZ Top 40 Singles Chart, but peaked at number three on the NZ Heatseeker Singles Chart.)	49	MC: Gold	Non-album single
"When I Die" (Jay Prince featuring Axlfolie)	2017	—	—	—	—	—	—	—	—		Late Summers
"Shake It Up" (G-Eazy featuring E-40, MadeinTYO and 24hrs)	2017	—	—	—	—	—	—	—	—		Non-album single
"Headlock" (Cousin Stizz featuring Offset)	2017	—	—	—	—	—	—	—	—		One Night Only
"Hasta Luego" (JID)	2017	—	—	—	—	—	—	—	—		DiCaprio 2
"4 AM" (2 Chainz featuring Travis Scott)	2017	55	24	—	—	—	—	—	—	RIAA: 2× Platinum	Pretty Girls Like Trap Music
"Tango (Go)" (Preme)	2017	—	—	—	—	—	—	—	—		Light of Day
"Flipmode" (Fabolous with Chris Brown and Velous)	2017	—	—	—	—	—	—	—	—		Non-album single
"Can't Hang" (Preme featuring PartyNextDoor)	2017	—	—	—	—	—	—	—	—		Light of Day
"MotorSport" (Migos with Nicki Minaj and Cardi B)	2017	6	3	3	73	12	—	— (Note: "MotorSport" did not enter the NZ Top 40 Singles Chart, but peaked at number two on the NZ Heatseeker Singles Chart.)	49	RIAA: Gold	Culture II
"Whohasit" (Nessly featuring Ski Mask the Slump God)	2018	—	—	—	—	—	—	—	—		Wildflower
"Help a Bitch Out" (Snow Tha Product featuring O.T. Genasis)	2018	—	—	—	—	—	—	—	—		Non-album singles
"8AM" (EMP)	2018	—	—	—	—	—	—	—	—		Non-album singles
"Yeah Yeah" (1017 Eskimo, Hoodrich Pablo Juan and Yung Mal featuring Gucci Mane)	2018	—	—	—	—	—	—	—	—		Non-album singles
"SSP" (Dice Soho featuring Ty Dolla Sign and Desiigner)	2018	—	—	—	—	—	—	—	—		You Could Have
"Bring It Back" (Rich the Kid)	2018	—	—	—	—	—	—	—	—		Non-album single
"Tati" (6ix9ine featuring DJ Spinking)	2018	46	23	—	—	—	—	— (Note: "Tati" did not enter the NZ Top 40 Singles Chart, but peaked at number eight on the NZ Heatseeker Singles Chart.)	100		Dummy Boy
"Programs" (Mac Miller)	2018	—	—	—	—	—	—	—	—		Non-album single
"Fefe" (6ix9ine featuring Nicki Minaj and Murda Beatz)	2018	4	3	3	52	4	16	3	35	MC: Gold	Dummy Boy and Queen
"Nephew" (Smokepurpp featuring Lil Pump)	2018	— (Note: "Nephew" did not enter the Billboard Hot 100, but peaked at number 5 on the Bubbling Under Hot 100 chart, which acts as an extension to the Hot 100.)	—	—	—	—	—	—	—		Non-album single
"Sicko Mode" (Travis Scott)	2018	1	1	1	6	3	43	7	9	ARIA: 4× Platinum; BPI: Platinum; GLF: Gold; MC: 2× Platinum; RIAA: Diamond; RMNZ: 2× Platinum	Astroworld
"Everybody Dies" (Logic)	2018	— (Note: "Everybody Dies" did not enter the Billboard Hot 100, but peaked at number 22 on the Bubbling Under Hot 100 Singles chart.)	— (Note: "Everybody Dies" did not enter the Billboard Hot R&B/Hip-Hop Songs chart, but peaked at number nine on the Bubbling Under R&B/Hip-Hop Singles chart.)	—	—	—	— (Note: "Everybody Dies" did not enter the NZ Top 40 Singles Chart, but peaked at number 37 on the NZ Hot Singles Chart.)	—	—		YSIV
"No Budget" (Kid Ink featuring Rich the Kid)	2018	—	—	—	—	—	—	—	—		Missed Calls
"Chi Chi" (Trey Songz featuring Chris Brown)	2019	—	—	—	—	—	—	—	—		TBA
"PGP" (Booba)	2019	—	—	—	—	—	—	—	—		TBA
"I" (Lil Skies)	2019	39	17	15	—	51	—	—	93	MC: Gold; RIAA: Platinum	Shelby
"No Idea" (Don Toliver)	2019	48	16	—	43	19	86	32	39	RIAA: Platinum	Heaven or Hell
"100 Shooters" (Future featuring Meek Mill and Doe Boy)	2019	—	—	—	—	—	—	—	—	RIAA: Gold	High Off Life
"Melee" (Tory Lanez)	2019	—	—	—	—	—	—	—	—		Non-album single
"Costa Rica" (Dreamville featuring Bas, JID, Guapdad 4000, Reese Laflare, Jace, Mez, Smokepurpp, Buddy and Ski Mask the Slump God)	2019	75	30	—	—	—	—	—	—	RIAA: Gold	Revenge of the Dreamers III
"Oh Ok" (Lil Gotit)	2019	—	—	—	—	—	—	—	—		Non-album single
"London to 1800" (Bexey with Jackboy)	2019	—	—	—	—	—	—	—	—		Non-album single
"2 At a Time" (A1)	2019	—	—	—	—	—	—	—	—		TBA
"Virgil Discount" (T.R.U. with 2 Chainz and Skooly)	2020	—	—	—	—	—	—	—	—		No Face No Case and Nobody Likes Me
"Contact" (Wiz Khalifa featuring Tyga)	2020	—	—	—	—	—	—	—	—		The Saga of Wiz Khalifa
"Been Thru This Before" (Marshmello with Southside featuring Giggs and Saint Jhn)	2020	—	—	—	—	—	—	—	—		TBA
"It's Whatever" (Smokepurpp)	2020	—	—	—	—	—	—	—	—		Florida Jit
"Vacation" (Tyga)	2020	— (Note: "Vacation" did not enter the Billboard Hot 100, but peaked at number 23 on the Bubbling Under Hot 100 chart.)	—	—	—	—	—	—	—		TBA
"Paranoia / #1 Stunna" (Fxxxxy)	2020	—	—	—	—	—	—	—	—		Do You Trust Me?
"Crocodile Tears" (Cousin Stizz)	2020	—	—	—	—	—	—	—	—		TBA
"12 Problems" (Rapsody)	2020	—	—	—	—	—	—	—	—		Reprise
"Bop It" (Fivio Foreign featuring Polo G)	2020	—	—	—	—	—	—	—	—		TBA
"Back" (Jeezy featuring Yo Gotti)	2020	—	—	—	—	—	—	—	—		The Recession 2
"Black Mask" (Jay Gwuapo featuring Pop Smoke)	2020	—	—	—	—	—	—	—	—		TBA
"What That Speed Bout!?" (Mike Will Made-It featuring Nicki Minaj and YoungBoy Never Broke Again)	2020	35	—	—	—	76	—	—	—		Michael
"Period" (Smoove'L)	2020	—	—	—	—	—	—	—	—		Ice Cups and Shootouts
"Wish List" (Yo Gotti)	2020	—	—	—	—	—	—	—	—		TBA
"Heavy" (Nigo with Lil Uzi Vert)	2022	— (Note: "Heavy" did not enter the Billboard Hot 100, but peaked at number 14 on the Bubbling Under Hot 100 chart.)	—	—	—	—	—	—	—		I Know Nigo!
"MVP" (FaZe Kaysan with Sheck Wes and Fivio Foreign)	2022	—	—	—	—	—	—	—	—		TBA
"Big League" (Yo Gotti with Moneybagg Yo, CMG The Label featuring Mozzy and Lil Poppa)	2022	—	—	—	—	—	—	—	—		TBA
"Distraction" (Polo G)	2022	39	7	7	—	31	—	7	61		Hood Poet
"Jimmy Cooks" (Drake feat. 21 Savage)	2022	1	1	—	4	1	34	3	7	ARIA: Platinum; RIAA: 3× Platinum; BPI: Gold; RMNZ: Platinum	Honestly, Nevermind
"Lalalala" (Stray Kids)	2023	90	—	—	64	65	—	—	44		Rock-Star
"—" denotes a recording that did not chart or was not released in that territory.

== Awards and nominations ==
=== BET Awards ===
The BET Awards are awarded annually by BET. Cubeatz has been nominated seven times and won once.

Year	Nominee / work	Award	Result
2018	Black Panther (Kendrick Lamar)	Album of the Year	Nominated
2018	Culture II (Migos)	Album of the Year	Nominated
2018	MotorSport (Migos with Nicki Minaj and Cardi B)	Coca-Cola Viewers' Choice Award	Nominated
2019	Invasion of Privacy (Cardi B)	Album of the Year	Won
2019	Astroworld (Travis Scott)	Album of the Year	Nominated
2019	Championships (Meek Mill)	Album of the Year	Nominated
2019	Sicko Mode (Travis Scott)	Coca-Cola Viewers' Choice Award	Nominated
2019	Sicko Mode (Travis Scott)	Best Collaboration	Nominated
2022	Donda (Kanye West)	Album of the Year	Nominated

=== Grammy Awards ===
The Grammy Awards are awarded annually by The Recording Academy. Cubeatz has been nominated ten times and won once.

Year	Nominee / work	Award	Result
2017	Views (Drake)	Album of the Year	Nominated
2017	Views (Drake)	Best Rap Album	Nominated
2017	Blank Face LP (Schoolboy Q)	Best Rap Album	Nominated
2019	"Sicko Mode" (Travis Scott)	Best Rap Performance	Nominated
2019	"Sicko Mode" (Travis Scott)	Best Rap Song	Nominated
2019	Invasion of Privacy (Cardi B)	Best Rap Album	Won
2019	Astroworld (Travis Scott)	Best Rap Album	Nominated
2020	Clout (Offset featuring Cardi B)	Best Rap Performance	Nominated
2020	I Am > I Was (21 Savage)	Best Rap Album	Nominated
2020	Revenge of the Dreamers III (Dreamville)	Best Rap Album	Nominated
2020	Championships (Meek Mill)	Best Rap Album	Nominated
2022	Donda (Kanye West)	Album of the Year	Nominated
2022	Donda (Kanye West)	Best Rap Album	Nominated
