= Guapdad 4000 =

American rapper (born 1992)

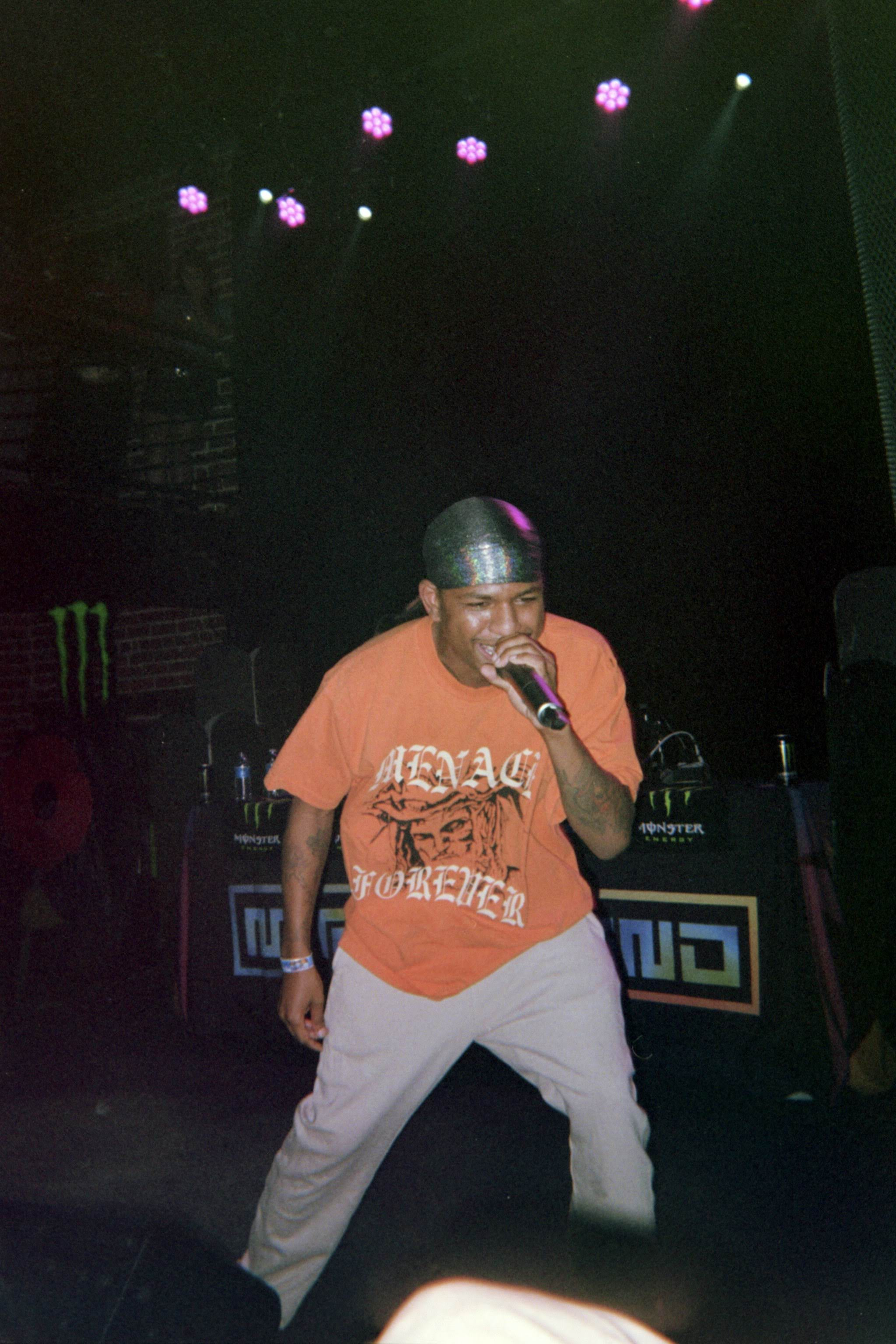
- Hayes performing in 2019

Background information
- Born: Akeem Ali Douglas Hayes; July 26, 1992 (age 34); Oakland, California, US
- Genre: Hip-hop
- Occupations: Rapper; singer; songwriter
- Instrument: Vocals
- Years active: 2017–present
- Labels: TWNSHP; Warner
- Member of: Zoink Gang
- Website: guapdad4000.com

Akeem Ali Douglas Hayes (born July 26, 1992), professionally known as Guap aka Guapdad4000, is an American rapper, singer, and songwriter. He is also a member of the hip hop supergroup Zoink Gang, with JID, Smino, and Buddy. He released his first mixtape Scamboy Color on December 6, 2017. His debut studio album Dior Deposits was released on October 25, 2019.

== Musical career ==
On December 6, 2017, Hayes released his first mixtape Scamboy Color, which included production from Ducko McFli, IAMSU, and Guapdad himself, among others. In 2018, he made a guest appearance on fellow west coast rapper Buddy's album Harlan & Alondra on the song "Shameless".

On January 6, 2019, Hayes was invited to the Dreamville Records recording sessions for the compilation album Revenge of the Dreamers III. He was featured on the songs "Don't Hit Me Right Now", "Wells Fargo", and "Costa Rica". He talked about the recording sessions in an interview saying "[It was] Life-changing. The best musical learning experience ever."

Throughout 2018 and 2019, Hayes released a handful of singles including "Flossin'", "Scammin", "First Things First", "Prada Process", and "Gucci Pajamas". On October 25, 2019, his debut album Dior Deposits was released, including features from Tory Lanez, 6lack, Chance the Rapper, G-Eazy and Buddy, among others.

In 2020, Hayes went on to work on a project that has a story and hidden clues of what this mysterious project is. He worked on the new project during quarantine, due to COVID-19. On April 24, 2020, he released the EP Platinum Falcon Tape, Vol. 1. On August 14, he released the sequel EP Platinum Falcon Returns, featuring guest appearances from Denzel Curry, Deante' Hitchcock, and Boogie.

On March 19, 2021, Hayes released a collaboration album 1176, with !llmind.

== Artistry ==
In an interview with XXL, Hayes said he grew up listening to artists like Dom Kennedy, Mac Dre, Pharrell Williams, and Kanye West, saying "I take so much. I got so much from them. I like personalities because I got a big one." His vocals and style also get compared to Ma$e, Fabolous, and Cam'ron.

== Personal life ==
Hayes was born on July 26, 1992, the son of a Filipino mother and an African American father. He highlighted his cultural upbringing and heritage in his second studio album, 1176, saying it is a "bridge in commonalities between Asian and American culture".

== Discography ==
=== Studio albums ===
Title	Album details
Dior Deposits	Released: October 25, 2019; Label: TWNSHP; Format: Digital download
1176 (with !llmind)	Released: March 19, 2021; Label: TWNSHP, 88rising, 12tonemusic, PARADISE RISING; Format: Digital download

=== Extended plays ===
Title	Album details
Platinum Falcon Tape, Vol. 1	Released: April 24, 2020; Label: TWNSHP (Domestic), Dopamine Music Group (International); Format: Digital download
Platinum Falcon Returns	Released: August 14, 2020; Label: TWNSHP (Domestic), Dopamine Music Group (International); Format: Digital download

=== Mixtapes ===
Title	Album details
Scamboy Color	Released: December 6, 2017; Label: TWNSHP; Format: Digital download

=== Singles ===
==== As lead artist ====
Title	Year	Album
"Flossin"	2019	Dior Deposits
"Scammin" (featuring Mozzy)	2019	Dior Deposits
"First Things First" (featuring G-Eazy and Reo Cragun)	2019	Dior Deposits
"Prada Process" (featuring 6lack)	2019	Dior Deposits
"Gucci Pajamas" (featuring Chance the Rapper and Charlie Wilson)	2019	Dior Deposits
"Bali" (with Rich Brian)	2020	Non-album single
"Lil Scammer That Could" (with Denzel Curry)	2020	Platinum Falcon Returns
"No Home for the Brave"	2020	Platinum Falcon Returns
"Alpha"	2020	Non-album single

=== As featured artist ===
Title	Year	Peak chart positions			Certifications	Album
Title	Year	US	US R&B/HH	CAN	Certifications	Album
"Costa Rica" (with Bas and JID, featuring Guapdad 4000, Reese LAFLARE, Jace, Mez, Smokepurpp, Buddy and Ski Mask the Slump God)	2019	75	30	71	RIAA: Platinum	Revenge of the Dreamers III
"Déjà Vu" (Deante' Hitchcock featuring Guapdad 4000)	2020	–	–	–		Better

=== Guest appearances ===
List of non-single guest appearances, with other performing artists, showing year released and album name
Title	Year	Other artist(s)	Album
"Tesla"	2018	Hugo Joe	Hugo Dro
"Shameless"	2018	Buddy	Harlan & Alondra
"Link Up"	2019	Buddy, Bas, Kent Jamz, JID, Ari Lennox	Harlan & Alondra
"Weed & Wine"	2019	Safia Mafia	Love Kills
"Don't Hit Me Right Now"	2019	Bas, Yung Baby Tate, Cozz, Buddy	Revenge of the Dreamers III
"Wells Fargo"	2019	JID, EarthGang, Buddy	Revenge of the Dreamers III
"Love 'Em"	2019	Hakeem	Cream of Crop
"Dolemite"	2019	AD, Sorry Jaynari	By The Way 2
"Passcode"	2020	Ari Lennox, Buddy, Smino, Mez	Revenge of the Dreamers III: Director's Cut
"No Chorus"	2020	Bas, Buddy, Dreezy	Revenge of the Dreamers III: Director's Cut
"Oaklandish"	2020	Too $hort, Rayven Justice	Ain't Gone Do It / Terms and Conditions
"People Pleaser"	2021	Quadeca	From Me to You
