= Costa Rica (Dreamville, Bas and JID song) =

2019 hip hop single

Single by Dreamville with Bas and JID, featuring Guapdad 4000, Reese Laflare, Jace, Mez, Smokepurpp, Buddy and Ski Mask the Slump God

from the album Revenge of the Dreamers III and the EP ROTD3.COM
- A-side: "LamboTruck"
- Released: July 1, 2019
- Recorded: January 2019
- Studio: Tree Sound Studios, Atlanta, Georgia
- Genre: Hip hop
- Length: 3:37
- Label: Dreamville; Interscope
- Songwriters: Destin Route; Abbas Hamad; Ricks II; Hayes; Thaddeus Williams; Jason Harris; Omar Pineiro; Sims III; Stokeley Goulbourne; Kedrick Cannady; Tim Gomringer; Kevin Gomringer
- Producers: Pyrex; Cubeatz

Dreamville singles chronology
"Down Bad" / "Got Me" (2019)	"Costa Rica" / "LamboTruck" (2019)	"Bussit" / "Still Up" (2019)

JID singles chronology
"Down Bad" (2019)	"Costa Rica" (2019)	"I Got Money Now" (2020)

Bas singles chronology
"Down Bad" (2019)	"Costa Rica" (2019)	"Risk" (2020)

Reese Laflare singles chronology
"Drip Like That" (2018)	"Costa Rica" (2019)	"Lil Skate For President" (2019)

Jace singles chronology
"By The Hour" (2017)	"Costa Rica" (2019)

Mez singles chronology
"MF+G" (2019)	"Costa Rica" (2019)	"Southside Mez" (2020)

Smokepurpp singles chronology
"Remember Me" (2019)	"Costa Rica" (2019)	"Body Bag" (2019)

Buddy singles chronology
"Wells Fargo" (2019)	"Costa Rica" (2019)	"1993" (2019)

Ski Mask the Slump God singles chronology
"Faucet Failure" (2019)	"Costa Rica" (2019)	"Carbonated Water" (2019)

"Costa Rica" is a single released by American record label Dreamville, performed by American rappers Bas and JID, featuring fellow American rappers Guapdad 4000, Reese Laflare, Jace of Two-9, Mez, Smokepurpp, Buddy, and Ski Mask the Slump God. It was released on July 1, 2019, along with "LamboTruck" as the third and fourth single from Dreamville's 2019 compilation album, Revenge of the Dreamers III.

== Background ==
In February, Dreamville gave a live preview of the song at a free concert in Charlotte after the 2019 NBA All-Star Game. Under the EP ROTD3.COM. The single was released with "LamboTruck" on July 1. It is the most collaborated song on the album, with 9 artists featured on the song.

== Recording and composition ==
The song was produced by Pyrex and Cubeatz. Guapdad 4000 said he was inspired to write the hook when he found fans and media impressions from Costa Rica on his social media. Bas said that the song was recorded with whoever was left in the studio during the sessions in Atlanta, saying the A room [at Tree Sound Studios] yielded a lot of "high-energy" songs "because it was the hub. Every day when you would pull up, it was the one big room that hosted a bunch of people, and then there are some more ducked off rooms if you wanted to get a more intimate session."

It's funny because we don't even have footage from "Costa Rica," because it had to be like 5:30 in the morning. We’re all in the A room, and Pyrex started playing the beat. Pyrex, he's one of the producers on the record, as well as CuBeatz. Then we had the wildest session. Everything came together on the spot. Buddy and Guapdad [4000] got on top of the speakers at one point when the song was over. I think we ran it back at least 20, 25 times, with everyone in there performing it. Everyone in there was jumping around.

== Critical reception ==
Writers of the HotNewHipHop staff ranked the song among their "30 best posse cuts of all time" saying, "while healthy competition can drive a posse cut to heightened levels of excellence, so too can the simple purity of camaraderie. Especially when substances are involved. The Revenge Of The Dreamers 3 sessions were legendary in that regard, bringing emcees of all walks of life into the studio for a two-weeks-long creative haven, culminating in no shortage of new music and friendships forged along the way. In many says, the bombastic “Costa Rica” feels like the heart of the Dreamers sessions, a gathering of like-minded emcees feeding off one another's energy during an extensive night of recording."

== Commercial performance ==
"Costa Rica" peaked at number 75 on the US Billboard Hot 100. On December 18, 2019, the song was certified gold by the Recording Industry Association of America (RIAA).

== Credits and personnel ==
Credits and personnel adapted from Tidal.

- Abbas Hamad – featured artist, composer, lyricist
- Destin Route – featured artist, composer, lyricist
- Guapdad 4000 – featured artist, composer, lyricist
- Reese LAFLARE – featured artist, composer, lyricist
- Jace – featured artist, composer, lyricist
- Mez – featured artist, composer, lyricist
- Smokepurpp – featured artist, composer, lyricist
- Buddy – featured artist, composer, lyricist
- Ski Mask the Slump God – featured artist, composer, lyricist
- Cubeatz – producer, composer, lyricist
- Pyrex – producer, composer, lyricist
- Joe LaPorta – mastering engineer
- Juru "Mez" Davis – mixer
- Miguel Scott – recording engineer

== Charts ==
Chart (2019)	Peak position
US Billboard Hot 100	75
US Hot R&B/Hip-Hop Songs (Billboard)	30

== Certifications ==
Region	Certification	Certified units/sales
New Zealand (RMNZ)	Gold	15,000^{‡}
United States (RIAA)	Platinum	1,000,000^{‡}
^{‡} Sales+streaming figures based on certification alone.
