= Sacrifices (Dreamville, EarthGang and J. Cole song) =

Song by Dreamville, EarthGang and J. Cole featuring Smino and Saba

from the album Revenge of the Dreamers III
- Released: July 5, 2019
- Recorded: January 2019
- Studio: Tree Sound Studios, Atlanta, Georgia
- Genre: Hip hop; soul
- Length: 6:22
- Label: Dreamville; Interscope
- Songwriters: Jermaine Cole; Olu Fann; Christopher Smith, Jr.; Tahj Chandler; Benjamin Tolbert; Justin Henderson
- Producers: Groove; Henny Tha Bizness

"Sacrifices" is a song released by record label Dreamville, performed by American rappers EarthGang and J. Cole featuring fellow American rappers Smino and Saba. The song was released as the final track on the label's compilation album, Revenge of the Dreamers III.

== Background ==
On January 6, 2019, Dreamville announced the compilation album and the recording sessions taking place at Tree Sound Studios in Atlanta, Georgia, inviting a total of 343 artists and producers throughout the 10 days. A snippet of the song was teased in the documentary film Dreamville Presents: Revenge, released on July 2, 2019. The song is described as a posse cut which features contributions from Midwest rappers Saba and Smino, who are frequent collaborators and part of the trio Ghetto Sage. J. Cole's verse on the song revealed he and his wife have a second child on the way.

== Recording and production ==
Groove said in an interview that the song was produced in 2018, but due to miscommunication and a few missed opportunities, it never came out. "I made that beat sometime last fall and crazy enough, I had actually sent that to Cole a while ago." Co-producer Henny Tha Bizness sent Groove a folder of loops and samples including the guitar riffs that was used to make "Sacrifices." Groove claims that without Childish Major organizing the beat in his laptop, "this song doesn't exist. During the rap camp, ideas were lost so fast." He continued to say in the interview "I've based my whole career on sacrifices. For this to be my first placement, it just means so much to me. 'Sacrifices' involves everyone who pushed me to the next level. Childish ushered me into these rooms, which allowed me to be at the right place at the right time. For him to be the one who recorded it, that’s special."

The song was recorded during Dreamville's 10-day recording sessions for the compilation album, between January 6 to January 16, 2019. On the fifth day, Groove described the studio saying "it was kind of an energy shift of the artists that were there," as Buddy, Smino, Saba, Mez, and more arrived to the sessions. Olu was the first to record his verse while Smino, Saba were writing their verses and Cole was the last to record his verse. The song was created on the same day and the same room as the Elite-produced "1993", with a total of ten songs made that day.

== Critical reception ==
A writer for Revolt praised J. Cole's verse saying "the song would not be what it was without the Dreamville founder adding his two sense. Coming in hot on verse five, Cole brings it home with a grand finale. Every bar captures the reality of what happens when you work hard and dedicate your living life for what you're truly passionate about. For Cole, it's music." Writing for HipHopDX, Trent Clark said "Cole gives the people want they want: some insight into his typically guarded household and openly praises his wife for their good fortune." Lucy Shanker of Consequence of Sound wrote about J. Cole's feature run saying he "inhabits the same role he's been in for the past year: a redeeming feature. Just as he did on 21 Savage's "A Lot" or Anderson .Paak's "Trippy", Cole exhibits his uncanny ability to both elevate and seal together a song."

== Music video ==
The official music video for "Sacrifices" was released on August 12, 2019, marking the first visuals released from the album. The video was directed by Scott Lazer, David Peters, and Chad Tennies, and produced by Tripp Kramer. The video was dedicated to Olu's late father who died in 2018, and features an appearance from the rapper's mother.

== Credits and personnel ==
Credits and personnel adapted from Tidal.

- Jermaine Cole – featured artist, composer, lyricist
- Olu Fann – featured artist, composer, lyricist
- Christopher Smith Jr. – featured artist, composer, lyricist
- Tahj Chandler – featured artist, composer, lyricist
- Groove – producer, composer, lyricist
- Henny Tha Bizness – producer, composer, lyricist
- Joe LaPorta – mastering engineer
- Juru "Mez" Davis – mixer
- Miguel Scott – recording engineer
- Demetrius Sims – bass
- Sharod Allen – guitar

== Certifications ==
Region	Certification	Certified units/sales
New Zealand (RMNZ)	Gold	15,000^{‡}
United States (RIAA)	Platinum	1,000,000^{‡}
^{‡} Sales+streaming figures based on certification alone.
