= 1-888-88-DREAM =

EP by Dreamville
- Released: June 12, 2019
- Recorded: January 2019
- Studios: Tree Sound Studios, Atlanta, Georgia
- Genres: Hip hop; R&B
- Length: 7:33
- Labels: Dreamville; Interscope
- Producers: Deputy; MD Beatz; OZ; Pluss

Dreamville chronology
Revenge of the Dreamers II (2015)	1-888-88-DREAM (2019)	ROTD3.COM (2019)

Singles from 1-888-88-DREAM
- 1. "Down Bad" Released: June 12, 2019; 2. "Got Me" Released: June 12, 2019

1-888-88-DREAM is the first extended play by American record label Dreamville. It was first released on June 12, 2019 by Dreamville Records and Interscope Records. It contains the dual singles "Down Bad" featuring J. Cole, JID, Bas, EarthGang, and Young Nudy and "Got Me" featuring Ari Lennox, Omen, Ty Dolla Sign, and Dreezy, from the label's compilation album, Revenge of the Dreamers III released in July 2019.

== Background ==
Under the "umbrella" 1-888-88-DREAM, both singles were released on Wednesday, June 12, 2019. Dreamville representatives used the hotline phone number to talk to fans and also play some exclusive tracks from the label's compilation album, Revenge of the Dreamers III. The EP’s title is referencing the “1-888-88-DREAM” phone number that Cole used to announce the original Revenge of the Dreamers in 2014.

== Track listing ==
Credits and personnel adapted from Tidal.

No.	Title	Writer(s)	Producer(s)	Length
1.	"Down Bad" (featuring J. Cole, JID, Bas, EarthGang, and Young Nudy)	Jermaine Cole; Destin Route; Abbas Hamad; Olu Fann; Quantavious Thomas; Asheton Hogan	Pluss	2:49
2.	"Got Me" (featuring Ari Lennox, Omen, Ty Dolla Sign, and Dreezy)	Courtney Salter; Damon Coleman; Tyrone Griffin, Jr.; Sandrea Sledge; Jamil Pierre; Ozan Yildirim; Mirsad Dervic; Floyd Howard; Faith Evans; Carl Thompson	Deputy; OZ; MD Beatz^{[a]}	4:44
Total length:				7:33

Notes

- ^{^[a]} signifies a co-producer

Sample credits

- "Got Me" contains a sample of "Come Over", written by Faith Evans, Floyd Howard and Carl Thompson, as performed by Faith Evans.

== Personnel ==
Credits adapted from Tidal.

- Miguel Scott – recording (track 1)
- Jeff Thompson – recording (track 2)
- Juro "Mez" Davis – mixing (all tracks)
- Joe LaPorta – mastering (all tracks)

== Release history ==
Region	Date	Format(s)	Label	Ref.
Various	June 12, 2019	Digital download; streaming	Dreamville; Interscope	
