= Buddy (rapper) =

American rapper and singer (born 1993)

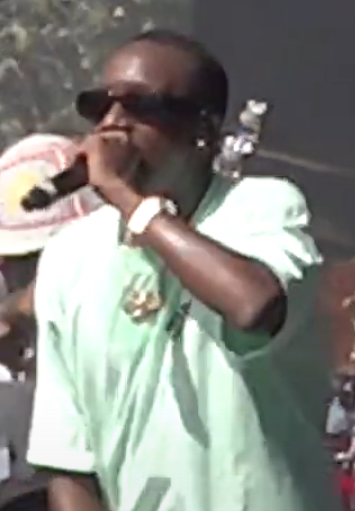
- Buddy performing in 2022

Background information
- Born: Simmie Sims III; September 10, 1993 (age 32); Compton, California, US
- Genres: West Coast hip-hop; R&B
- Occupations: Rapper; singer; songwriter; dancer; actor
- Years active: 2009–present
- Labels: I Am Other; Columbia; Cool Lil Company; RCA; Empire
- Member of: Zoink Gang
- Website: coollilcompany.com

Simmie Sims III (born September 10, 1993), known professionally as Buddy, is an American rapper, singer, dancer and actor. He is also a member of the hip-hop supergroup Zoink Gang, with JID, Smino and Guapdad 4000.

== Early life ==
Introduced to gospel and soul by his father, a preacher and choir director, Buddy began his performance career at age seven by starring in plays and musicals including The Wiz, Oliver with a Twist, and Dreamgirls at Amazing Grace Conservatory. "I grew up as a full-fledged entertainer rather than just somebody trying to rap about stuff," he has said about that experience. When the school became too expensive, he withdrew, later attending a high school performing arts program in Long Beach, California.

== Career ==
=== 2009–2015: Career beginnings and signing to I Am Other ===
As a teenager, Buddy began recording his own material. In 2009, he got a break when TV music supervisor Scott Vener showed Pharrell Williams an early effort by the 15-year-old Buddy. Impressed, Pharrell began to work with the teenager, and signed him to his I Am Other creative collective and record label. When Buddy was 18, he released the song "Awesome Awesome", produced by The Neptunes and Pharrell made an appearance in the video.

On March 28, 2012, he released the single "Staircases" produced by Pharrell and featuring Kendrick Lamar.

In 2014, continuing to work with Pharrell, Buddy released his debut mixtape, Idle Time, which featured Kendrick Lamar, Miley Cyrus, Freddie Gibbs, Robin Thicke, Sir Michael Rocks, and others, with production from Pharrell Williams, Chuck Inglish, Boi-1da, Cardo, Blaq, and Polyester, among others.

He then embarked on a series of collaborations with various artists, including Nipsey Hussle, BJ The Chicago Kid, Chance the Rapper, Wiz Khalifa, and ASAP Rocky.

=== 2016–17: Ocean & Montana and Magnolia ===
In November 2016, Buddy released "Shine", produced by Mike & Keys along with DJ Khalil. It was premiered by hip-hop and R&B tastemaker Carl Chery, along with a music video directed by Andy Hines and featuring a cameo from Nipsey Hussle. The song garnered over 2.7 million streams on Spotify, 12 million on Apple Music, and over 2 million views on YouTube. Buddy described the single as "a ghetto hymn acknowledging inevitable death while showing gratitude for abundant life." On August 17, he released his second EP, Magnolia, which included features from Boogie, Wiz Khalifa, and Kent Jamz.

Buddy's EP Ocean & Montana, produced by Kaytranada, was released May 19, 2017, by Cool Lil Company, and features the single "Find Me". The EP's title refers to the intersection in Santa Monica where he lived, sought inspiration, and began collaborating with Kaytranada after leaving his parents' home.

=== 2018–2021: Harlan & Alondra ===
Buddy released his debut full-length album, Harlan & Alondra, through Cool Lil Company and RCA Records on July 20, 2018. It includes the singles "Black" featuring ASAP Ferg, "Trouble on Central", "Hey Up There" featuring Ty Dolla Sign, and "Trippin'" featuring Khalid. He stated that his aim was "to paint a well-rounded portrait of my home city", Los Angeles.

In spring 2018, Buddy joined Joey Badass on the Amerikkkana Tour. His summer 2018 tour with A$AP Ferg included performances at Chicago's Lollapalooza festival.

On April 17, 2020, he released a collaboration album with Kent Jamz, titled Janktape Vol. 1.

=== 2022–present: Superghetto, Don't Forget To Breathe, and acting ===
Buddy released his second full-length album, Superghetto, on March 25, 2022. He released a deluxe version of the album later that year. During an interview on Apple Music 1, he stated the album was "about the essence [of] growing up in the hood". Mic described the album as "a record that uses its brevity to keep the listener on their heels, that successfully manages to feel as if it's constantly molting and evolving until it cuts off".

On March 28, 2024, Buddy released his third studio album, Don't Forget to Breathe, via the independent Empire Distribution label. Uproxx noted his decision to leave RCA and release the album independently, highlighting a few lines from the album's opening track "Free My Mind" that follows: "I was super ghetto at first / Redefined myself, left the label, bettered my worth / I could sign myself".

On 28 March 2025, he was featured on fellow West Coast rapper YG's song "2004", along with the Gang.

On 3 June 2025, Buddy was announced as part of the cast of the upcoming spin-off television series for Snowfall (2017–2023), set to make his acting debut.

== Discography ==
=== Albums ===
List of albums, with selected details
Title	Album details
Harlan & Alondra	Released: July 20, 2018; Label: RCA; Format: CD, Digital download
Superghetto	Released: March 25, 2022; Label: RCA; Format: CD, Digital download
Don't Forget to Breathe	Released: March 8, 2024; Label: Empire; Format: Streaming, Digital download

=== Collaboration albums ===
List of collab albums, with selected details
Title	Album details
Janktape Vol. 1 (with Kent Jamz)	Released: April 17, 2020; Label: RCA; Format: Digital download

=== Extended plays ===
List of extended plays, with selected details
Title	Album details
Ocean & Montana (with Kaytranada)	Released: May 19, 2017; Label: i Am Other, Columbia; Format: Digital download
Magnolia	Released: August 25, 2017; Label: i Am Other, Columbia; Format: Digital download

=== Mixtapes ===
List of mixtapes, with selected details
Title	Album details
Idle Time	Released: February 25, 2014; Label: i Am Other, Columbia; Format: Digital download

=== Singles ===
Title	Year	Peak chart positions	Album
Title	Year	US Rhy.	Album
"Hey Up There" (featuring Ty Dolla Sign)	2018	38	Harlan & Alondra
"Trippin'" (featuring Khalid)	2018	—	Harlan & Alondra
"Black" (featuring A$AP Ferg)	2018	—	Harlan & Alondra

==== As featured artist ====
Song	Year	Peak chart positions US R&B	Album
"Favorite" (Leon Thomas III featuring Buddy)	2018	17	Genesis
"Pasadena" (Tinashe featuring Buddy)	2021	—	333
"2004" (YG featuring Buddy and the Gang)	2025	—	Non-album single

=== Guest appearances ===
List of non-single guest appearances, with other performing artists, showing year released and album name
Title	Year	Other artist(s)	Album
"Dope Dealer"	2012	Reese	Reese Vs The World 2
"Contact"	2013	Chuck Inglish	Droptops
"Dangerous"	2013	Chuck Inglish, Jane Jupiter	Droptops
"Wakebake"	2013	Reese	DSNRTRAPN
"Song to Fuck To"	2013	YMTK, Royce the Choice	MPL 2: Murphy Pan's Labyrinth
"Elevators"	2014	Chuck Inglish, Polyester the Saint	Convertibles
"Status Symbol"	2014	Nipsey Hussle	Mailbox Money
"One Time"	2014	Sir Michael Rocks	Banco
"New Money"	2015	—N/a	Dope (Music From The Motion Picture)
"Man Down"	2016	BJ the Chicago Kid, Constantine, PJ Morton	In My Mind
"Church"	2016	BJ the Chicago Kid, Chance the Rapper	In My Mind
"This Is Your Moment"	2016	DJ Quik, Problem, Wiz Khalifa, JP Cali Smoov	Rosecrans: The Album
"I Swear"	2016	Warm Brew	Diagnosis
"Status Symbol 2"	2016	Nipsey Hussle	Slauson Boy 2
"Way High"	2016	ASAP Mob, ASAP Rocky, Wiz Khalifa, BJ the Chicago Kid	Cozy Tapes Vol. 1: Friends
"Could You Be Love"	2017	Moxie Raia	1996
"Pullup"	2017	Cousin Stizz	One Night Only
"In-N-Out"	2017	Budgie, Chris O'Bannon, Emmavie	The Good Book Vol. 2
"CPT"	2017	Budgie, Jay Worthy	The Good Book Vol. 2
"Status Symbol 3"	2018	Nipsey Hussle	Victory Lap
"Cry"	2018	Alison Wonderland	Awake
"Lowkey"	2018	Cosmo's Midnight, Jay Prince	What Comes Next
"Don't Hit Me Right Now"	2019	Bas, Yung Baby Tate, Guapdad 4000, Cozz	Revenge of the Dreamers III
"Wells Fargo"	2019	JID, Guapdad 4000, EarthGang	Revenge of the Dreamers III
"Costa Rica"	2019	Bas, JID, Guapdad 4000, Reese Laflare, Jace, Mez, Smokepurpp, Ski Mask the Slump God	Revenge of the Dreamers III
"1993"	2019	Cozz, Smino, EarthGang, JID, J. Cole	Revenge of the Dreamers III
"Get Away"	2019	BJ the Chicago Kid, JID, Kent Jamz	1123
"Not Numb"	2019	Childish Major, Olu	Dirt Road Diamond
"Late Night"	2020	Cozz, Omen, Landstrip Chip	Revenge of the Dreamers III: Director's Cut
"Passcode"	2020	Ari Lennox, Smino, Mez, Guapdad 4000	Revenge of the Dreamers III: Director's Cut
"No Chorus"	2020	Bas, Guapdad 4000, Dreezy	Revenge of the Dreamers III: Director's Cut
"Spaceship"	2020	Asher Roth	Flowers on the Weekend
"Sleepless Nights"	2020	Terrace Martin, Robert Glasper, 9th Wonder, Kamasi Washington, Reuben Vincent, Phoelix	Dinner Party: Dessert
