= Up Late =

Up Late or UpLate may refer to:

== Television ==
- UpLate, a weeknightly Big Brother Australia show
- UpLate, a weeknightly Pinoy Big Brother show
- The Up-Late Game Show, a late night show that replaced Big Brother Australia's UpLate

== Music ==
- "Up Late", a song by Kodak Black from Project Baby 2 (2017)
- "Up Late", a song by Ari Lennox from Shea Butter Baby (2019)
