= Shea Butter Baby (remix EP) =

Shea Butter Baby (Remix EP)

EP / Remix album by Ari Lennox
- Released: March 27, 2020
- Genre: R&B
- Length: 10:31
- Label: Dreamville; Interscope
- Producer: Jermaine Cole (also exec.); Elite (also exec.); Omen; Ron Gilmore; Craig Brockman

Ari Lennox chronology
Shea Butter Baby (2019)	Shea Butter Baby (Remix EP) (2020)	Away Message (2022)

Shea Butter Baby (Remix EP) is a remix extended play by American singer Ari Lennox. It was released on March 27, 2020, by Dreamville and Interscope Records. The album was executive produced by Dreamville producer Elite. In addition, the majority of the album was produced by Dreamville's in-house producers: J. Cole, Elite, Omen, Ron Gilmore.

== Background ==
The remix EP consists of three remixed version from Lennox's debut album Shea Butter Baby (2019) and features guest appearances from Doja Cat, Smino, and Durand Bernarr. It contained remixes for the songs "BMO", "I Been" and "Facetime".

== Critical reception ==
An editor for HotNewHipHop gave a review of the EP writing "Throwing Doja Cat on one of the album's biggest hits was a smart move, and Doja's versatility allows her to make any song her own without overshadowing the original artist. Doja once again proves that she can drop bars, contrasting her signature raspy flow with her vocal prowess of a higher register. Smino comes in strong on the "I Been" remix, holding his own for the first half while offering a male voice to the relationship woes anthem."

== Track listing ==
Credits adapted from Tidal.

No.	Title	Writer(s)	Producer(s)	Length
1.	"BMO (Remix)" (featuring Doja Cat)	Salter; Coleman; Parrino; Gilmore Jr.; Galt MacDermot; Amalaratna Dlamini	Omen; Elite^{[a]}; Gilmore^{[a]}	2:29
2.	"I Been (Remix)" (featuring Smino)	Salter; Gilmore; Christopher Smith, Jr.	Gilmore	4:46
3.	"Facetime (Remix)" (featuring Durand Bernarr)	Salter; Cole; Bernarr	J. Cole; Craig Brockman^{[a]}	3:16
Total length:				10:31

Notes

- ^{^[a]} signifies an additional producer.
