= Got Me (song) =

Single by Dreamville with Ari Lennox and Omen featuring Ty Dolla Sign and Dreezy

from the album Revenge of the Dreamers III and the EP 1-888-88-DREAM
- A-side: "Down Bad"
- Released: June 12, 2019
- Recorded: January 2019
- Studio: Tree Sound Studios, Atlanta, Georgia
- Genre: R&B; hip hop
- Length: 4:44
- Label: Dreamville; Interscope
- Songwriters: Courtney Salter; Damon Coleman; Tyrone Griffin, Jr.; Sandrea Sledge; Jamil Pierre; Ozan Yildirim; Mirsad Dervic; Joi Coleman; Floyd Howard; Faith Evans; Carl Thompson
- Producers: Deputy; OZ; MD Beatz

Dreamville singles chronology
"Got Me" / "Down Bad" (2019)	"LamboTruck / Costa Rica" (2019)

Ari Lennox singles chronology
"Up Late" (2019)	"Got Me" (2019)	"BMO" (2019)

Ty Dolla Sign singles chronology
"Do You Mean" (2019)	"Got Me" (2019)	"Recepits" (2019)

Dreezy singles chronology
"RIP Aretha" (2019)	"Got Me" (2019)

"Got Me" is a song released by American record label Dreamville, performed by American musicians Ari Lennox and Omen featuring fellow American musicians Ty Dolla $ign and Dreezy. It was released on June 12, 2019, alongside "Down Bad" as the second singles from the label's third compilation album, Revenge of the Dreamers III (2019).

== Background ==
Under the EP 1-888-88-DREAM, the single was released with "Down Bad" on Wednesday, June 12. The EP's title is referencing the “1-888-88-DREAM” phone number that Cole used to announce the original Revenge of the Dreamers in 2014. Dreamville representatives used hotline phone number to talk to fans and also play some exclusive tracks from the label's compilation album.

== Composition ==
The song is produced by Deputy, OZ, and MD Beatz. It contains a sample of "Come Over" by Faith Evans from her debut studio album Faith. Although being uncredited, Ari Lennox said Deante' Hitchcock, Vincent Berry, and Yung Baby Tate helped write her verse for the song.

== Critical reception ==
Erika Marie of HotNewHipHop called the song a "sultry R&B jam" and said it "is a song that you can dedicate to that special somebody or groove to when you're cruising around on a hot summer night." The writer continued to mention that it is a nice balance and shows that Revenge of The Dreamers is cooking up an album that will have a little something for everyone."

== Credits and personnel ==
Credits and personnel adapted from Tidal.

- Courtney Shenade Salter – featured artist, composer, lyricist
- Damon Coleman – featured artist, composer, lyricist
- Tyrone Griffin, Jr. – featured artist, composer, lyricist
- Sandrea Sledge – featured artist, composer, lyricist
- Deputy – producer, composer, lyricist
- OZ – producer, composer, lyricist
- MD Beatz – producer, composer, lyricist
- Joi Coleman - composer, lyricist
- Floyd Howard – composer, lyricist
- Faith Evans – composer, lyricist
- Carl Thompson – composer, lyricist
- Joe LaPorta — mastering engineer
- Juru "Mez" Davis — mixer
- Jeff Thompson — recording engineer

== Charts ==
Chart (2019)	Peak position
US Rolling Stone Top 100	98

== Certifications ==
Region	Certification	Certified units/sales
United States (RIAA)	Gold	500,000^{‡}
^{‡} Sales+streaming figures based on certification alone.
