= Revenge of the Dreamers III =

Compilation album by Dreamville
- Released: July 5, 2019
- Recorded: 2018 (Note: "Middle Child" and "Big Black Truck" recorded in 2018); January 6−16, 2019
- Studios: The Sheltuh, Raleigh, North Carolina ("Middle Child"); Tree Sound, Atlanta, Georgia
- Genres: Hip hop; R&B; trap
- Length: 64:25
- Labels: Dreamville; Interscope
- Producers: Jermaine Cole; Archer; Big Gator BOSSMAN.; Bink!; Bizness Boi; Brilliant Mack; Cam O'bi; ChaseTheMoney; Christo; ClickNPress; Cubeatz; Deputy; Dijon Stylez; Dunk Rock; E. Dan; Elite; Galimatias; Girl Talk; Groove; Henny Tha Bizness; Hollywood JB; Jay Kurzweil; Kenneth Harris; Kal Banx; Keanu Beats; Lil'A; Louie Ji; MD Beatz; Meez; Monte Booker; Nice Rec; Nxstalgic; Olu; OZ; Pluss; Pyrex; Ron Gilmore; Sensei Bueno; Supah Mario; T-Minus

Dreamville chronology
Revenge of the Dreamers II (2015)	Revenge of the Dreamers III (2019)	D-Day: A Gangsta Grillz Mixtape (2022)

Revenge of the Dreamers III: Director's Cut cover

Singles from Revenge of the Dreamers III
- 1. "Middle Child" Released: January 23, 2019; 2. "Down Bad / Got Me" Released: June 12, 2019; 3. "LamboTruck / Costa Rica" Released: July 1, 2019; 4. "Bussit / Still Up" Released: January 13, 2020

Revenge of the Dreamers III is the third compilation album by American record label Dreamville, released on July 5, 2019, by Dreamville and Interscope Records.

Revenge of the Dreamers III includes contributions from Dreamville artists: leader J. Cole, Bas, Cozz, Omen, Lute, Ari Lennox, EarthGang, and JID. The album features appearances from several artists including DaBaby, T.I, Young Nudy, Buddy, Reason, Maxo Kream, Ski Mask the Slump God, Mez, 6lack, Mereba, Vince Staples, Ty Dolla Sign, Dreezy, Smino, Saba, and Guapdad 4000, among others. The album features production from a variety of record producers, including T-Minus, Christo, Elite, Bink!, Deputy, Henny Tha Bizness, Hollywood JB, ChaseTheMoney, Pyrex, Galimatias, Pluss, Kal Banx, and Cam O'bi, among others. Recording sessions for Revenge of the Dreamers III took place in Atlanta, Georgia at Tree Sound Studios over the course of 10 days in January 2019. A total of 343 artists and producers were invited, while 142 songs were recorded during the sessions. On the standard edition of the album, 35 artists and 27 producers contributed to the final product. The album was accompanied by a thirty-minute documentary titled, Dreamville Presents: Revenge, documenting the recording sessions.

The album was supported by the single "Middle Child", and two sets of dual singles. The first of the two sets included the songs "Down Bad" and "Got Me" and was released on June 12, 2019. The second set of dual singles were released on July 1, 2019, titled "LamboTruck" and "Costa Rica". The deluxe edition of the album was released on January 16, 2020, with 12 additional songs supported by the dual singles "Bussit" and "Still Up".

Revenge of the Dreamers III received positive reviews from critics and debuted atop the US Billboard 200, selling 115,000 album-equivalent units in its first week, earning Dreamville its first US number-one album. The album also debuted at number one on Billboard's Canadian Albums Chart. Revenge of the Dreamers III was certified Platinum by the Recording Industry Association of America (RIAA). The album was nominated for Best Rap Album at the 2020 Grammy Awards, while "Middle Child" and "Down Bad" were nominated for Best Rap Performance.

== Background ==
On January 6, 2019, J. Cole took to Twitter to announce the album, by uploading a gold poster-like invitation. The poster read: Your presence and participation is requested for the recording sessions of the upcoming compilation album Revenge of The Dreamers III. Recording sessions took place in Atlanta at Tree Sound Studios beginning January 6 through January 16, 2019. Senior writer for DJBooth, Yoh Phillips, was invited to the recording sessions and remarked on how the whole idea came to be:

Initially, the idea was to bring the team together as a gathering of operation. Due to various touring schedules, the only available window to put Dreamville's collective troupe in one room as a unit was early January. It was decided from the "sixth to the sixteenth," a 10-day period, that creating as a community would best suit all the artists and producers. Rather quickly, the idea began to evolve, extending from merely being in-house into an invitation-only affair that spread far beyond the label.

== Recording and production ==
It was an amazing experience. Cole and the Dreamville crew brought all creatives to them all under the same roof to create the best art we could. The great energy in that building was untouched.

— Producer S1 spoke about the recording sessions.

Throughout the 10-days of recording, invitations were shared by the entire Dreamville roster, among other artists and producers outside of Dreamville. A total of 343 artists and producers were invited to the sessions. Describing the scene in the several rooms of the studio, videographer Chase Fade said: "There's different energy in all of these different rooms, with a bunch of producers coming in, a bunch of rappers coming in, singers, managers, you name it. If you pop in one room and they're making trap music, you pop in another room and they're making some R&B, pop in another room and they're making some soulful stuff. You never know." According to Dreamville President Ibrahim Hamad, over 124 songs were recorded, as he spoke with XXL on the thought process behind the 10-day recording sessions:

[The idea for rap camp] came about some time in November [or] December. The way we did Revenge of the Dreamers II was me grabbing records and putting them together, maybe sending one to somebody to throw a verse on and then coming to Cole. I was like, "We got new energy, a whole new camp of people. Let’s try for the first time to really get in and work." The idea of that [10-day] window was ’cause I knew Bas was coming back from Africa and it was before he went on tour on the West Coast. And I knew JID was going on tour. It was the only window to get everybody together. We knew it was either going to be Atlanta or L.A. I’m glad we picked Atlanta because it just has a different culture. L.A. would’ve been real industry. [In] Atlanta, the energy was just right. A lot of producers were already there. We knew that Tree Sound was a spot that was big enough and had a lot of rooms that we always rock with.

On the first day of recording, Bas arrived from South Africa to Atlanta, hearing JID record a verse and hook for "Down Bad", and decided to write his verse on the song. "Sunset" was produced by Pryex who says, "It was a skeleton that I and ChaseTheMoney had started in another studio. We had started that a year ago and we came back to it, and were in the room making the beat when J. Cole walked in, heard it and was like, 'Can I write?'" Deante' Hitchcock arrived on the fourth day, who wrote his verse for "PTSD" with Omen, Cam O'bi, Mereba, and St. Beauty. Arsenio Archer made the beat for "Self Love" before arriving at the Dreamville sessions, as Najee Travis arranged for Ari Lennox and Baby Rose to be on the song.

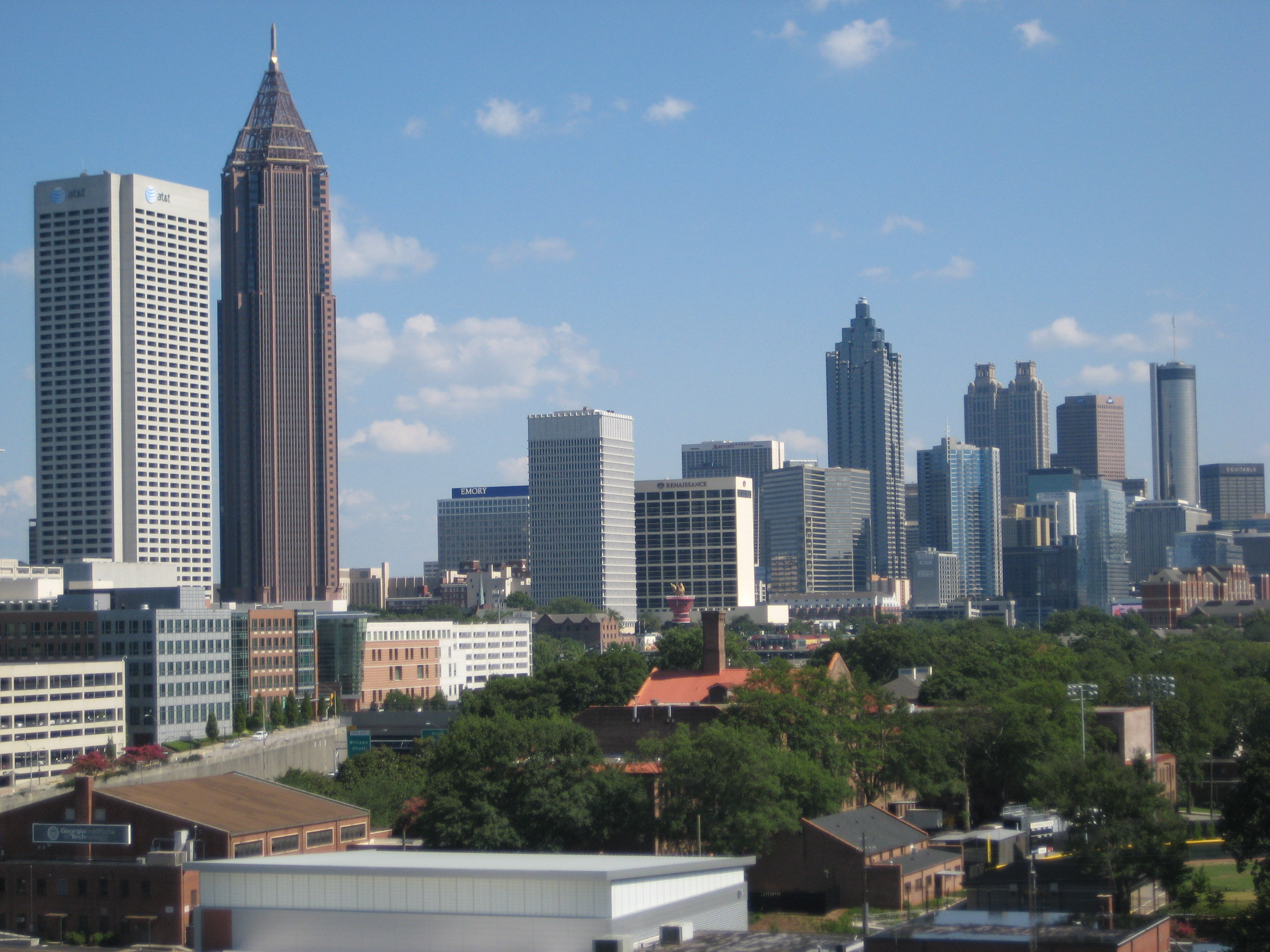
The album was recorded in Atlanta in January 2019.

On the fifth day, Groove said "it was kind of an energy shift of the artists that were there," as Buddy, Smino, Saba, Mez, and more arrived to the sessions. "Sacrifices" was produced by Groove and co-produced by Henny Tha Bizness, who gave Groove a folder of samples to work with and included the guitar riffs used on the song. Olu was the first to record his verse as Smino, Saba and Cole were writing their verses. The song was created on the same day and the same room as the Elite-produced "1993", with a total of ten songs made that day.

Bas recalls that "Costa Rica" was recorded around 5:00 A.M. with whoever was left in the studio, the song ended up becoming the most collaborated track on the album with nine artists. Hollywood JB made the "Oh Wow" beat in the summer of 2017, and was intended to be sent to J. Cole before he released KOD. He played it in a session with Smino, JID, Buddy, and Guapdad 4000 as all started working on the hook before Cole walked in the room and recorded his verse. "Wells Fargo" was recorded on the last day, with Buddy freestyling a verse and JID had a cadence for the hook, Guapdad 4000 says the song was created in "15 minutes or less".

== Release and promotion ==
During the 2019 NBA All-Star Weekend in Charlotte, North Carolina, Dreamville held multiple events scheduled for the weekend, starting with an exclusive limited edition merchandise pop-up shop, a Dreamville brunch, and a private concert featuring the artists on the label taking place after the All Star game – which J. Cole was the halftime show performer. During the free concert, they previewed a few songs from the album. The entire Dreamville roster was featured on the cover of XXL magazine's spring 2019 issue, shot by photographer Jonathan Mannion. JID spoke with the magazine talking about the album saying "that’s the most creative shit I ever did. I want to do this for the rest of my life—just collab and record, be around creatives and shit. It’s all respect, all love, no egos. You making relationships with people outside of if you get a song done. Y’all probably exchange numbers. And that’s cool ’cause I like to have a conversation before I jump into creating."

Dreamville representatives used hotline phone number, 1-888-88-DREAM to talk to fans and also play some exclusive tracks from the album. On June 26, 2019, Dreamville released a trailer announcing, Dreamville Presents: Revenge, a film documenting the album's recording sessions in Atlanta. The documentary was released on July 2, 2019 on Dreamville's official YouTube account. On July 1, 2019, J. Cole took to social media to announce that the album would be released on July 5, 2019. Cole also posted a link to a pre-order page selling limited edition merchandise, including Revenge of the Dreamers III on vinyl. Dreamville revealed the official tracklist, and production and engineer credits a few hours before the album's release. On July 4, 2019, J. Cole and Dreamville hosted The Day Party at the sold out Brooklyn Mirage and was joined by DJ Clue?, DJ Moma, and DJ Spade.

The deluxe edition of the album was announced on July 19. Fans got a chance to hear songs from it at the 2019 ComplexCon in Chicago on July 20 and 21, 2019. Free limited edition Revenge of the Dreamers III comics was released on July 27, 2019, in Chicago, New York City, Los Angeles, Charlotte, and Atlanta. Only 200 copies were available per city. Revenge of the Dreamers III: Director's Cut was released on January 16, 2020, including 12 songs featuring 8 Dreamville artists, as well as 6lack, Buddy, Smino, Saba, Dreezy, Childish Major, Guapdad 4000, Mez, and more.

=== Singles ===
On January 20, 2019, J. Cole cleared his Instagram page, the next day Cole cryptically posted a series of posts, they read: I'm Counting My Bullets, I'm Loading My Clips, I'm Writing Down Names, and I'm Making A List, Cole later deleted the tweets. Later that same day, Cole announced on social media that he was releasing a new single titled, "Middle Child" on January 23, 2019, at 9:00 PM EST, and uploaded the cover which featured the song's title capitalized over a grey background. With only one day of tracking, "Middle Child" debuted at number 26 on the US Billboard Hot 100. The following week, the song peaked at number 4, making it Cole's highest charting song. An accompanying music video for the track was released on February 25, 2019.

On June 12, 2019, the first of two sets of dual singles were released: "Down Bad" featuring J. Cole, JID, Bas, EarthGang, and Young Nudy, and "Got Me" featuring Ari Lennox, Omen, Ty Dolla Sign, and Dreezy. "Down Bad" has since peaked at number 64 on the US Billboard Hot 100. The official music video for "Down Bad" was uploaded on YouTube on October 22, 2019. The video was filmed in Atlanta, Georgia.

On July 1, 2019, the second set of dual singles were released: "LamboTruck" featuring Cozz, Reason, and Childish Major and "Costa Rica" featuring Bas, JID, Guapdad 4000, Reese Laflare, Jace, Mez, Smokepurpp, Buddy, and Ski Mask the Slump God. Both singles were released together as an extended play titled, ROTD3.COM, The EP's title is referencing the name of the website that Dreamville was selling limited merchandise on July 1, related to the album.

On January 13, 2020, the deluxe edition of the album was supported by two singles "Bussit" with Ari Lennox, and "Still Up" with EarthGang and Reason.

=== Other songs ===
On August 12, 2019, the music video for "Sacrifices" featuring J. Cole, EarthGang, Smino and Saba was released. The video was directed by Scott Lazer, David Peters, and Chad Tennies. On August 26, Dreamville released the music video for "Sleep Deprived" featuring Lute, Omen, Mez and DaVionne, and was shot in one-take in Harlem. On September 16, the music video for "Under the Sun" was released with Cole, Lute, and DaBaby, directed by Scott Lazer, Aisultan Seitov, David Peters, and Chad Tennies.

In 2020, Dreamville released additional music videos for "Swivel" directed by Micah Anthony, Chad Tennies, Mac Grant and Caleb Seales, "LamboTruck" directed by Neal Farmer, "Bussit" directed by Tajana B. Williams, and "Don't Hit Me Right Now" directed by Tyler Sobel-Mason.

== Critical reception ==
Professional ratings
Aggregate scores
Source	Rating
Metacritic	77/100
Review scores
Source	Rating
AllMusic	3.5/5 stars
2DOPEBOYZ	(favorable)
Consequence of Sound	B
Highsnobiety	4/5 stars
HipHopDX	4.1/5
Iowa State Daily	10/10
Our Culture Mag	7/10
The Philadelphia Inquirer	4/5 stars
Pitchfork	7.1/10
Vulture	(favorable)

Revenge of the Dreamers III received highly positive reviews from critics. At Metacritic, which assigns a normalized rating out of 100 to reviews from mainstream publications, the album received an average score of 77, indicating "generally favorable reviews".

Sheldon Pearce of Pitchfork called the album a "successful meeting of the minds", he wrote: "the comp works because it never feels forced or closed off to ideas. Cole sheds the trap parody of KOD to really identify with those younger than him, even if it's just to reach an understanding." Robert Blair of Highsnobiety gave a positive review stating, "Aware of their favorable position in the industry, Cole and Dreamville took it upon themselves to create a watershed moment that foregoes petty squabbles or territorialism in order to celebrate an artform that captivates millions around the world. A launching pad for future stars and another accolade in the storied career of others, this one, as they say, is for the culture." Writing for HipHopDX, Trent Clark praised the album calling it a "clinic for hardbody hip hop." He continued saying: "ROTD3 sports keepers for a wide range of Hip Hop listeners, further proof that Young Simba has grown into the Mufasa of this rap shit. And his Dreamville pack is keeping the spirit of emceeing alive." Aaron Williams of Uproxx said, "if there's any complaint to be had, it's a most unusual one after critics and fans alike spent much of 2018 begging for mercy from rappers who kept releasing long projects. This is one time the 18 tracks we were given don't feel like enough."

Writing for HotNewHipHop, Mitch Findlay said, "Given everything that went into crafting this third chapter of the Dreamville saga, it's difficult to deny the magnificent aura surrounding it. The accomplishment of its creation is enough to solidify the album as one of the year's most important releases thus far. Regardless of how one might feel about the music itself, the recording and release of Dreamers 3 is an integral moment in hip-hop culture." Lucy Shanker of Consequence of Sound wrote: "If Cole's greater purpose was boosting the career of his prodigies, he succeeded. Revenge of the Dreamers III points out the obvious: the complete takeover of DaBaby, the undeniable powerhouse that is JID, and the melodious and irresistibly genuine Ari Lennox. But Cole has also done the anti-Drake: Instead of being a fan of artists whose talent reaches in different directions than his and subsequently exploiting their sound for his own benefit, Cole has provided the ultimate platform for underground artists to succeed."

=== Accolades ===
Year-end lists
Publication	List	Rank	Ref.
Ambrosia For Heads	Ambrosia For Heads' Top 15 Hip-Hop Albums Of 2019	—N/a	
Complex	The Best Albums of 2019	21	
DJBooth	75 Best Hip-Hop and R&B Albums of 2019	62	
HipHopDX	The Best Rap & Hip Hop Albums Of 2019	3	
HotNewHipHop	Top 25 Hottest Hip-Hop Albums Of 2019	8	
Uproxx	The Best Hip-Hop Albums Of 2019	19	
Vibe	The 30 Best Albums of 2019	10	

=== Awards ===
Year	Ceremony	Category	Result	Ref.
2019	BET Hip Hop Awards	Album of the Year	Nominated	
2020	Grammy Awards	Best Rap Album	Nominated	

== Commercial performance ==
Revenge of the Dreamers III debuted at number one on the US Billboard 200 with 115,000 album-equivalent units, of which 24,000 were pure album sales. It is Dreamville's first US number-one album, and J. Cole's sixth. Four songs from Revenge of the Dreamers III managed to chart on the US Billboard Hot 100, led by J. Cole's "Middle Child", which charted at number 34; in February, the song peaked at number 4 to become his highest-charting song. The tracks "Under the Sun", "Down Bad" and "Costa Rica" charted at positions 44, 64 and 75, respectively. Revenge of the Dreamers III remained in the top 10 of Billboard 200 for the next several weeks, selling 33,000 in its fourth week.

On July 30, 2019, Revenge of the Dreamers III was certified Gold by the Recording Industry Association of America (RIAA) for sales of over 500,000 album-equivalent units in the US. As of August 30, 2019 the album has been in the top 15 of the US Billboard 200 for seven straight weeks. Since release "Down Bad", and "Costa Rica" has all been certified Gold, while "Under the Sun" has been certified platinum and "Middle Child" has been certified quintuple platinum. On April 27, 2020, the album has been certified platinum.

After the release of the deluxe edition, the album earned the largest chart gains of that week, rising to number 12 on the Billboard 200, selling 33,000 album-equivalent units in its 29th week.

== Track listing ==
Revenge of the Dreamers III track listing
No.	Title	Writer(s)	Producer(s)	Length
1.	"Under the Sun" (with J. Cole and Lute featuring DaBaby)	Jermaine Cole; Luther Nicholson; Jonathan Kirk; John Welch; Asheton Hogan; Peter Mudge	Christo; Nice Rec; Pluss	3:21
2.	"Down Bad" (featuring JID, Bas, J. Cole, EarthGang, and Young Nudy)	Cole; Destin Route; Abbas Hamad; Olu Fann; Quantavious Thomas; Hogan	Pluss	2:49
3.	"LamboTruck" (with Cozz featuring Reason and Childish Major)	Cody Osagie; Robert Gill, Jr.; Markus Randle; Kalon Berry	Kal Banx	3:49
4.	"Swivel" (with EarthGang)	Eian Parker; Fann; Roosevelt Harrell	Bink!	3:14
5.	"Oh Wow...Swerve" (with J. Cole featuring Zoink Gang, Key! and Maxo Kream)	Cole; Route; Christopher Smith, Jr.; Simmie Sims III; Akeem Hayes; Justin Bryant; Keanu Torres; Armando Shala; Marquis Whittaker; Emekwanem Biosah, Jr.	Hollywood JB; Bizness Boi; Keanu Beats; Lil' A	4:35
6.	"Don't Hit Me Right Now" (with Bas and Cozz featuring Yung Baby Tate, Guapdad 4000 and Buddy)	Hamad; Osagie; Hayes; Tate Farris; Sims III; Matias Køedt	Galimatias	2:54
7.	"Wells Fargo" (interlude) (with JID and EarthGang featuring Buddy and Guapdad 4000)	Route; Fann; Sims III; Hayes; Welch; Eric Dan; Tyler Mason	Christo; E. Dan; Nostxlgic	2:03
8.	"Sleep Deprived" (with Lute and Omen featuring Mez and DaVionne)	Damon Coleman; Nicholson; Morris Ricks II; DaVionne Starks; Jarrett Goodly; Kaleb Rollins; Marc Soto; Oladotun Oyebadejo, Jr.	ClickNPress; Sensei Bueno^{[a]}; Jay Kurzweil^{[a]}; Ron Gilmore^{[b]}; Meez^{[b]}; Pyrex^{[b]}; Cam O'bi^{[b]}	3:58
9.	"Self Love" (with Ari Lennox and Bas featuring Baby Rose)	Hamad; Courtney Salter; Jasmine Wilson; Arsenio Archer	Archer; Sensei Bueno^{[a]}	3:43
10.	"Ladies, Ladies, Ladies" (with JID featuring T.I.)	Route; Clifford Harris, Jr.; Kalon Berry	Kal Banx	2:47
11.	"Costa Rica" (with Bas and JID featuring Guapdad 4000, Reese Laflare, Jace, Mez, Smokepurpp, Buddy and Ski Mask the Slump God)	Route; Hamad; Ricks II; Hayes; Thaddeus Williams; Jason Harris; Omar Pineiro; Sims III; Stokeley Goulbourne; Kedrick Cannady; Tim Gomringer; Kevin Gomringer	Pyrex; Cubeatz	3:37
12.	"1993" (with J. Cole, JID, Cozz and EarthGang featuring Buddy and Smino)	Cole; Route; Osagie; Parker; Smith, Jr.; Sims III; Anthony Parrino	Elite	3:30
13.	"Rembrandt...Run It Back" (with J. Cole and JID featuring Vince Staples)	Cole; Route; Vincent Staples; Berry	Kal Banx; Christo	2:31
14.	"Sunset" (with J. Cole featuring Young Nudy)	Cole; Thomas; Cannady; Chase Rose	ChaseTheMoney; Pyrex	2:58
15.	"Got Me" (with Ari Lennox and Omen featuring Ty Dolla Sign, and Dreezy)	Salter; Coleman; Tyrone Griffin, Jr.; Sandrea Sledge; Jamil Pierre; Ozan Yildirim; Mirsad Dervic; Joi Coleman; Floyd Howard; Faith Evans; Carl Thompson	Deputy; OZ; MD Beatz^{[a]}	4:44
16.	"Middle Child" (performed by J. Cole)	Cole; Allan Felder; Norman Harris; Tyler Williams	T-Minus; J. Cole	3:33
17.	"PTSD" (with Omen featuring Mereba, Deante' Hitchcock and St. Beauty)	Marian Mereba; Coleman; Deante' Van Hitchcock; Alexe Belle; Isis Valentino; Cameron Osteen	Cam O'bi; Kenneth Harris^{[a]}	3:57
18.	"Sacrifices" (with EarthGang and J. Cole featuring Smino and Saba)	Cole; Fann; Smith, Jr.; Tahj Chandler; Benjamin Tolbert; Justin Henderson	Groove; Henny Tha Bizness	6:22
Total length:				64:25

Revenge of the Dreamers III: Director's Cut
No.	Title	Writer(s)	Producer(s)	Length
19.	"Big Black Truck" (with JID)	Route; Welch	Christo; Nice Rec	2:32
20.	"Still Up" (with EarthGang featuring Reason)	Fann; Parker; Gill, Jr.; Joshua Morgan	Meez; Olu^{[a]}; Louie Ji^{[c]}	3:25
21.	"Outta Pocket" (with Bas and Cozz)	Hamad; Osagie; Gregg Gillis	Girl Talk	2:37
22.	"Late Night" (with Cozz and Omen featuring Buddy and Landstrip Chip)	Osagie; Coleman; Sims III; Jordan Holt-May; Ahmanti Booker	Monte Booker	3:16
23.	"Spin Move" (with Bas featuring Saba, Smino and The Hics)	Hamad; Chandler; Smith, Jr.; Booker	Monte Booker	3:43
24.	"Bussit" (with Ari Lennox)	Salter; Dijon Larue Rasboro; Delfino Mack Jr; Parrino; Joi Coleman	Dijon Stylez; Brilliant Mack; Elite^{[b]}	2:30
25.	"Passcode" (with Ari Lennox featuring Buddy, Smino, Mez and Guapdad 4000)	Salter; Sims III; Smith, Jr.; Ricks II; Hayes; Booker; Welch	Monte Booker; Christo	3:26
26.	"Up Up Away" (with JID and EarthGang featuring Vince Staples)	Route; Parker; Staples; Welch	Christo; Westen Weiss^{[c]}	3:19
27.	"No Chorus" (with Bas featuring Buddy, Guapdad 4000 and Dreezy)	Hamad; Sims III; Hayes; Sledge; Matthew Alexander Washington; Lucas Difabbio	Big Gator Bossman; Dunk Rock^{[a]}	3:22
28.	"Disgusted" (with Cozz featuring Childish Major)	Osagie; Randle; Morgan; Mudge	Meez; Nice Rec^{[a]}; Louie Ji^{[c]}	2:43
29.	"Revenge" (with Lute, Omen, Ari Lennox and EarthGang featuring Childish Major and Reason)	Nicholson; Comeman; Salter; Parker; Randle; Gill, Jr.; Kalon Berry	Kal Banx; Ron Gilmore^{[a]}	5:33
30.	"Still Dreamin" (with JID and Lute featuring 6lack)	Route; Nicholson; Ricardo Valentine; Jonathan Dem	Supah Mario	4:21
Total length:				105:14

Notes

- ^{^[a]} signifies a co-producer
- ^{^[b]} signifies an additional producer
- ^{^[c]} signifies an uncredited co-producer
- "Under the Sun" features uncredited vocals from Kendrick Lamar
- "Middle Child" and "Bussit" are stylized in all caps
- "Swivel" is from EarthGang's debut album, Mirrorland
- "Oh Wow...Swerve" features uncredited vocals from JID
- "Don't Hit Me Right Now" features background vocals by Ari Lennox
- "PTSD" features uncredited vocals from Buddy

Sample credits

- "Got Me" contains a sample of "Come Over", written by Faith Evans, Floyd Howard and Carl Thompson, as performed by Faith Evans.
- "Middle Child" contains a sample of "Wake Up to Me", written by Allan Felder and Norman Harris, as performed by First Choice.

== Personnel ==
Credits adapted from Tidal.

Instrumentation

- Kenneth Harris - bass (track 17)
- Sensei Bueno – bass (track 8), guitar (tracks 8, 9)
- Cam O'bi – piano (track 8)
- Meez – keyboards (track 8)
- Pyrex – keyboards (track 8)
- Ron Gilmore – keyboards (track 8)
- Kal – drums (track 14)
- Demetrius sims - bass (track 18)
- Sharod Allen - guitar (track 18)

Technical

- Miguel Scott – recording (tracks 2, 3, 11)
- Jeffrey "Jeffontheboards" Thompson – recording (tracks 15, 17)
- Christian "Kidsilver" Sartwell – recording (track 3)
- Juro "Mez" Davis – mixing (all tracks)
- Joe LaPorta – mastering (all tracks)

Recording & Post Production Engineers

- Miguel Scott
- Jeffrey "Jeffontheboards" Thompson
- Kuldeep Chudasama
- Daniel Watson
- John Kadadu
- Kevin "Black Pearl" McClouskey
- DJ Kidd
- Frank Ramirez
- Olu
- Kaleb "K Quick" Rollins
- Gosha Usov
- Childish Major
- Elton "L10mixedit" Chueng
- Shaan Singh
- Liz Robson
- Robert Adam Schuller

== Charts ==
=== Weekly charts ===
Chart (2019)	Peak position
Australian Albums (ARIA)	2
Austrian Albums (Ö3 Austria)	72
Belgian Albums (Ultratop Flanders)	42
Canadian Albums (Billboard)	1
Danish Albums (Hitlisten)	39
Dutch Albums (Album Top 100)	14
French Albums (SNEP)	126
Lithuanian Albums (AGATA)	5
New Zealand Albums (RMNZ)	2
Norwegian Albums (VG-lista)	16
Swiss Albums (Schweizer Hitparade)	28
US Billboard 200	1
US Top R&B/Hip-Hop Albums (Billboard)	1

=== Year-end charts ===
Chart (2019)	Position
US Billboard 200	63
US Top R&B/Hip-Hop Albums (Billboard)	28
Chart (2020)	Position
US Billboard 200	73
US Top R&B/Hip-Hop Albums (Billboard)	52

== Certifications ==
Region	Certification	Certified units/sales
United States (RIAA)	Platinum	1,000,000^{‡}
^{‡} Sales+streaming figures based on certification alone.

== Release history ==
List of showing region, release dates, format(s), label(s) and reference(s)
Region	Date	Format	Label	Ref.
Various	July 2, 2019	Vinyl LP	Dreamville; Interscope	
Various	July 5, 2019	Digital download; streaming	Dreamville; Interscope	

== See also ==
- 2019 in hip hop music
- List of number-one albums of 2019 (Canada)
- List of Billboard 200 number-one albums of 2019
- List of Billboard number-one R&B/hip-hop albums of 2019
