= BMO (song) =

2019 single by Ari Lennox

Single by Ari Lennox

from the album Shea Butter Baby
- Released: August 6, 2019
- Recorded: 2018
- Genre: R&B
- Length: 2:26
- Label: Dreamville; Interscope
- Songwriters: Courtney Shenade Salter; Damon Coleman; Anthony Parrino; Ron Gilmore Jr.; Galt MacDermot
- Producers: Omen; Elite; Gilmore

Ari Lennox singles chronology
"Got Me" (2019)	"BMO" (2019)

Music video
- "BMO" on YouTube

"BMO" is a song by American singer Ari Lennox. It was released as the third single from her debut album Shea Butter Baby on August 6, 2019.

== Background ==
The song was produced by Omen and samples Galt MacDermot's "Space" (1969), a song that was also sampled in Busta Rhymes' "Woo Hah!! Got You All in Check" (1996) and Faith Evans’ "I Just Can’t" (1996).

== Recording and composition ==
In an interview with Revolt, Ron Gilmore spoke about the recording phase of the song stating that it was just the drums and the sample when Omen produced it. The song was left untouched in the vault until Ari's manager, Justin LaMotte, heard the song randomly because it wasn't intended to be on the album. Eventually, Omen asked him to play on the track. "When I got done with that song, mixing a little bit on it, adding a bass line, changing the drums up a little bit. By the time we got done with that song, that song was everything you hear today. That song took a leap. It went from not being on the album to being a smash."

Elite sat down with Billboard to talk about how the song was recorded, and he also mentioned how the song was not in contention for making the album. "Omen's computer had actually died since, and he didn't even have the files so he ended up remaking the beat. [...] I came in at the last minute and helped them tweak some of the sounds."

== Critical reception ==
Tyrell Nicolas of Clash wrote about the song saying "Lennox's artistic depth and quality has always been clear to see, but part of the appeal of Shea Butter Baby is its lingering commercial appeal, that's crying out to be explored. This can be seen early on, when 'BMO' leaps centre-stage and demands chart attention." He also wrote about how the song's sample proves to be infectious immediately, and rapidly became a social media fan favorite, as he continued to say "it's the perfect spring mid-tempo cut, and provides more than enough sass, innuendo, and funk-fuelled energy to engage wider audiences."

"BMO" received renewed public attention in October 2019, when reality television star and radio personality Ms. Juicy Baby performed a cover of the single live on Rickey Smiley's radio show which went viral. The song was also added to the in-game Hip-Hop radio station of The Sims 4.

== Music video ==
On August 6, 2019, Lennox released the music video for "BMO", directed by Child. Lennox stated that the video pays homage to some of her biggest influences Missy Elliott and Total. The video includes inspirations from Missy Elliott's "The Rain (Supa Dupa Fly)" and Total’s "Trippin'" music videos.

== Remix ==
On March 27, 2020, the remixed version was released featuring Doja Cat. It was released as part of the Shea Butter Baby (Remix EP).

== Live performances ==
On June 21, 2019, Ari Lennox made her television debut on The Tonight Show Starring Jimmy Fallon to perform a medley of "Up Late" and "BMO". The appearance took place directly after the North American leg of the Shea Butter Baby Tour concluded.

== Certifications ==
Region	Certification	Certified units/sales
United States (RIAA)	Platinum	1,000,000^{‡}
^{‡} Sales+streaming figures based on certification alone.
