= Dreamville Presents: Revenge =

Dreamville Presents: REVENGE
- Directed by: David Peters
- Written by: Matt Carter; Scott Lazer
- Produced by: Scott Lazer; Jermaine Cole (exec.); Ibrahim Hamad (exec.); Adam Roy Rodney (exec.)
- Starring: J. Cole; Ibrahim Hamad; Bas; Cozz; Omen; Lute; Ari Lennox; EarthGang; JID
- Distributed by: Dreamville Films
- Release date: July 2, 2019
- Running time: 30 minutes
- Language: English

Dreamville Presents: REVENGE is a documentary based on creation and recording of the compilation album Revenge of the Dreamers III. It was released on July 2, 2019 by Dreamville, to YouTube.

== Background ==
On January 6, 2019, Dreamville announced the compilation album on social media by uploading a gold poster-like invitation. The poster read: Your presence and participation is requested for the recording sessions of the upcoming compilation album Revenge of The Dreamers III. Recording sessions took place in Atlanta at Tree Sound Studios beginning January 6 through January 16, 2019. The invitation was posted by recipients on social media by many artists and producers including Big K.R.I.T., Mike Will Made It, DJ Khaled, Swizz Beatz, Tay Keith, T.I, Rick Ross, 9th Wonder and Wale, among others.

Throughout the 10-days of recording, invitations were shared by the entire Dreamville roster, among other artists and producers outside of Dreamville. Over 100 artists and producers were invited to the sessions. Describing the scene in the several rooms of the studio, videographer Chase Fade said: "There's different energy in all of these different rooms, with a bunch of producers coming in, a bunch of rappers coming in, singers, managers, you name it. If you pop in one room and they're making trap music, you pop in another room and they're making some R&B, pop in another room and they're making some soulful stuff. You never know." According to Dreamville, 142 songs were recorded from 343 invites of artists and producers.

The documentary featured multiple snippets and the creation of songs that made it on the album including "Sacrifices", "Down Bad", "LamboTruck", "Don't Hit Me Right Now", "Wells Fargo (Interlude)", and "1993", as well as songs that did not appear on the album.

== Release ==
On June 26, 2019, Dreamville released a trailer announcing, Dreamville Presents: REVENGE, a film documenting the album's recording sessions in Atlanta. In the trailer, J. Cole spoke on the recording sessions saying "I had this idea. Let's go somewhere, lock-in and invite a bunch of outside producers and artists to come fuck with us and just make this album." The documentary was released on July 2, 2019 on Dreamville's official YouTube account.

== Personnel ==
Credits adapted from the documentary film.

Directors of photography

- David Peters
- Matt Patroni
- Chase Fade
- Anthony Supreme

Associate producers

- Matthew Robinson
- Mwango Kasote

Editors

- Matt Carter
- Amani Hill (assistant)

Sound design mixing

- Sam Costello

Colorist

- David Torcivia

Graphics and art design

- Felton Brown

Animation

- David Peters

== Release history ==
List of showing region, release dates, format(s), label(s) and reference(s)
Region	Date	Format	Label	Ref.
Various	July 2, 2019	streaming	Dreamville	
