= Down Bad (Dreamville song) =

2019 single by Dreamville

Single by Dreamville featuring J. Cole, JID, Bas, EarthGang, and Young Nudy

from the album Revenge of the Dreamers III and the EP 1-888-88-DREAM
- B-side: "Got Me"
- Released: June 12, 2019
- Recorded: January 6, 2019
- Studio: Tree Sound Studios, Atlanta, Georgia
- Genre: Hip hop
- Length: 2:49
- Label: Dreamville; Interscope
- Songwriters: Jermaine Cole; Destin Route; Abbas Hamad; Olu Fann; Quantavious T. Thomas; Asheton Hogan
- Producer: Pluss

Dreamville singles chronology
"Down Bad" / "Got Me" (2019)	"LamboTruck" / "Costa Rica" (2019)

J. Cole singles chronology
"The London" (2019)	"Down Bad" (2019)	"Family and Loyalty" (2019)

JID singles chronology
"Fried Rice" (2019)	"Down Bad" (2019)	"Costa Rica" (2019)

Bas singles chronology
"Fried Rice" (2019)	"Down Bad" (2019)	"Costa Rica" (2019)

EarthGang singles chronology
"Proud of U" (2019)	"Down Bad" (2019)	"Up" (2019)

Music video
- "Down Bad" on YouTube

"Down Bad" is a song by American record label Dreamville featuring performances by American rappers J. Cole, JID, Bas, Johnny Venus of EarthGang, and Young Nudy, released on June 12, 2019 alongside "Got Me" as the dual second single from the label's 2019 compilation album, Revenge of the Dreamers III.

== Background ==
The song was created on the first day of Dreamville's sessions for the compilation album. Bas wrote on Instagram about his initial reaction to the song when he arrived in Atlanta:

"I had just landed from South Africa and went straight to the studio. Soon as I walked into the A-room, JID was starting this song, first verse and hook, and I was like '[save me a verse please]. That was literally the first verse I recorded when I got to Atlanta after a 17 hour flight, J. Cole was tucked off with T-Minus finishing "Middle Child" and popped his head in [the room] like 'yes, I need parts.' My brother Johnny Venus, who has my vote for camp MVP, well I don't want to give it away but he came in and managed to make the song his. A big assist from our host city's own Young Nudy."

In February, Dreamville gave a live preview of the song after the All Star game – where J. Cole was the halftime show performer, during the free concert in Charlotte. In May, JID also gave fans a snippet of the single during his set at Miami's Rolling Loud Festival.

Under the EP 1-888-88-DREAM, the single was released with "Got Me" on June 12. The EP's title is referencing the "1-888-88-DREAM" phone number that Cole used to announce the original Revenge of the Dreamers in 2014. Dreamville representatives used hotline phone number to talk to fans and also play some exclusive tracks from the label's compilation album.

== Composition ==
According to Genius, the song's "underlying beat is highly reminiscent" of "Rebel Without a Pause" by Public Enemy, although it is not a direct sample of the song.

== Music video ==
The official music video of the song was filmed in Atlanta, Georgia, and was uploaded on YouTube on October 22, 2019.

== Critical reception ==
Complex named "Down Bad" as one of the best songs of the week, calling it a "rowdy, kick-in-the-door anthem ready-made for summer mischief" and said the artists pack a ridiculous amount of energy into less than three minutes, beginning with a "tragically short verse" from Young Nudy and closing things with a "rapid-fire verse" from EarthGang's Johnny Venus.

== Commercial performance ==
"Down Bad" originally peaked at number 75 on the US Billboard Hot 100. Following the release of its parent album, Revenge of the Dreamers III, the song reached a new peak of number 64. On November 22, 2019, the song was certified gold by the Recording Industry Association of America (RIAA).

== Credits and personnel ==
Credits and personnel adapted from Tidal.

- Jermaine Cole – featured artist, composer, lyricist
- Destin Route – featured artist, composer, lyricist
- Abbas Hamad – featured artist, composer, lyricist
- Olu Fann – featured artist, composer, lyricist
- Quantavious T. Thomas – featured artist, composer, lyricist
- Pluss – producer, composer, lyricist
- Joe LaPorta – mastering engineer
- Juru "Mez" Davis – mixer
- Miguel Scott – recording engineer

== Charts ==
Chart performance
Chart (2019)	Peak position
Canada Hot 100 (Billboard)	69
New Zealand Hot Singles (RMNZ)	10
US Billboard Hot 100	64
US Rolling Stone Top 100	15

== Certifications ==
Certifications
Region	Certification	Certified units/sales
New Zealand (RMNZ)	Gold	15,000^{‡}
United States (RIAA)	Platinum	1,000,000^{‡}
^{‡} Sales+streaming figures based on certification alone.

== Awards and nominations ==
List of awards and nominations
Year	Award	Category	Result	Ref.
2020	Grammy Award	Best Rap Performance	Nominated	
