= Up Late (Ari Lennox song) =

Promotional single by Ari Lennox

from the album Shea Butter Baby
- Released: April 30, 2019
- Recorded: 2018
- Genre: R&B; smooth jazz
- Length: 4:26
- Label: Dreamville; Interscope
- Songwriters: Courtney Shenade Salter; Justin Bryant; Nicholas Venezia; Oliver Bergqvist; Kojo Asamoah
- Producers: Nick Quinn; Masego; Kojo; Hollywood JB; Bigg Kid

Ari Lennox chronology
| "Shea Butter Baby" (2019) | "Up Late" (2019) | "Got Me" (2019) |

"Up Late" is a song by American singer Ari Lennox. It was released as the fifth promotional single for the album Shea Butter Baby on April 30, 2019.

== Background ==
On April 30, Ari Lennox announced the release date and tracklist of the album, and released the single "Up Late". In an interview with Billboard, Ari Lennox said "A lot of these songs I’ve been holding on to for a long time, I just want the world to hear them. And then, finally, I can exhale." She also describes the song as "neo-soul sexy sweet midnight delight."

== Recording and composition ==
The song was produced by Nick Quinn, Masego, Kojo, Hollywood JB, and Bigg Kid. Masego also plays the saxophone on the track.

== Critical reception ==
Michael Saponara of Billboard said the "sultry jazz-tinged" song "finds her exercising her vocal range while detailing another romantic encounter." Cherise Johnson of HipHopDX wrote "Intimacy can go down at any time as indicated on her revealing third single, “Up Late,” where she sings of finally getting it in with a crush following a session of smoking on Backwoods."

== Music video ==
The official music video for "Up Late" was released on May 14, 2019. The video was directed by Lacey Duke and produced by Sarah Park. According to Billboard, the video "plants a white and red platform randomly in the middle of the open mountainous region, as Ari belts out the sensual lyrics and moves to the beat of her final SBB single under the clear blue skies." Masego also makes a guest appearance in the video.

== Live performances ==
On June 21, 2019, Ari Lennox made her television debut on Tonight Show Starring Jimmy Fallon to perform a medley of "Up Late" and "BMO". The appearance took place directly after the North American leg of the Shea Butter Baby Tour concluded.

== Credits and personnel ==
Credits and personnel adapted from Tidal.

- Courtney Shenade Salter – main artist, composer, lyricist
- Justin Bryant — producer, composer, lyricist
- Nicholas Venezia — composer, lyricist
- Oliver Bergqvist — composer, lyricist
- Kojo Asamoah — producer, composer, lyricist, recording engineer
- Masego — producer, associated performer, saxophone
- Bigg Kid — producer
- Juru "Mez" Davis — mixer, studio personnel

== Release history ==
| Region | Date | Format | Label | Ref. |
|---|---|---|---|---|
| Various | April 30, 2019 | Digital download | Dreamville; Interscope | |
