= Mez (rapper) =

American rapper

- Also known as: King Mez; Mez Heirs
- Born: Morris W. Ricks II; April 19, 1990 (age 36); Fort Campbell, Kentucky, U.S.
- Origin: Raleigh, North Carolina, U.S.
- Genre: Hip-hop
- Occupations: Rapper; producer; songwriter; music video director
- Years active: 2010–present
- Website: heirs.us

Mez, formerly known as King Mez, (born Morris W. Ricks II) is an American rapper, producer, songwriter and music video director. He was born on a military base in Fort Campbell, KY and grew up in Southeast Raleigh, NC, and known for his work with Dr. Dre and on the 2019 rap album Revenge of the Dreamers III.

== Musical career ==
The Los Angeles Times stated: "Mez has dropped a few acclaimed mixtapes including his most recent, "Long Live the King", but he most recently appeared on Dr. Dre's Compton, which arrive during "Darkside/Gone," "Satisfiction" and "Talk About It. He also wrote on 14 of the 16 songs. He is the majority writer after Dr. Dre himself." Mez has collaborated with fellow North Carolinians J. Cole, Rapsody, and Drique London, as well as producers 9th Wonder and Khrysis. Mez appeared on the Lecrae song "Lost My Way" from Church Clothes 2 mixtape. His first official co-sign from Dr. Dre came about during the airing of 'The Pharmacy' on Beats 1, via a freestyle Mez rapped over a beat produced by Cardiak, with Dr. Dre on the ad-libs. He released the album Electric Future Gangster in November 2026.

== Discography ==
- The King's Khrysis EP (with Khrysis) (2011)
- My Everlasting Zeal (2012)
- Long Live The King (2014)
- Data Plan .001 (2018)
- Data Plan .002 (2018)
- Data Plan .003 (2019)
- The Loading EP (2024)
- Electric Future Gangster (2026)

== Filmography ==
=== Music videos ===
- J.Cole – "Amari"
- J.Cole – "Middle Child"
- Dreamville – "Sleep Deprived"
- Sir – "Mood"
