= Reese Laflare =

American rapper and producer (born 1987)

- Born: Maurice Williams; September 8, 1987 (age 39); Birmingham, Alabama, U.S.
- Genre: Hip hop
- Occupations: Rapper; record producer
- Years active: 2011–present
- Label: Laflare Records

Maurice Williams, known by his stage name Reese Laflare, is an American rapper and record producer from Birmingham, Alabama. He was one of the original members of the hip hop collective Two-9.

== Career ==
=== 2011–present: Reese Vs the World mixtapes and DSNRTRAPN ===
On January 26, 2011, he released his debut mixtape Reese Vs the World via DatPiff. Following this mixtape, Reese went on to release Reese Vs the World 2 on October 30, 2012. Both mixtapes were hosted by Don Cannon.

On July 31, 2013, Reese released his third mixtape titled DSNRTRAPN via free digital download.

On March 2, 2015, Reese released his EP "Jump off a Building" featuring Rich Homie Quan, Kari Faux and more for free digital download and iTunes.

On September 29, 2015, Reese released his fourth mixtape titled DSNRTRAPN2 via free digital download. and purchase.

In September 2017, LaFlare was featured on Brisbane rapper Eric Sanders single "Purple Panther".

In August 2018, Reese was featured on the song "Forever Ever" by Trippie Redd alongside Young Thug.

On August 17, 2018, Reese released his official debut album Reese LaFlare with Empire Records.

On April 29, 2020, Reese debuted his new clothing line, Diva in the United States, along with an EP, Diva, Vol 1. He followed up the first release of his clothing brand with Diva, Vol 2 on July 29 with another EP. To close out 2020, Reese released Diva, Vol 3, with features from long time collaborators, Key! and Lil Yachty while also featuring rising Washington, D.C. rapper IDK. Reese has stated he would like to release his final album in 2021.

== Discography ==
=== Album ===
- Reese LaFlare (2018)
- Final Fantasy (2019)

=== Mixtapes ===
- Reese Vs the World (Hosted by Don Cannon) (2011)
- Reese Vs the World 2 (Hosted by Don Cannon) (2012)
- DSNRTRAPN (2013)
- DSNRTRAPN2 (2015)
- Before the Universe (2016)
- Been Had Boyz (with KEY!) (2017)

=== EPs ===
- Jump off a Building (2015)
- Diva, Vol. 1 (2020)
- Diva, Vol. 2 (2020)
- Diva, Vol. 3 (2020)
- Diva, Vol. 4 (Expected 2022)
