= Two-9 =

American hip hop collective

- Origin: Atlanta, Georgia, United States
- Genres: Hip hop
- Years active: 2009–present
- Label: EarDrummers
- Members: Key!; Curtis Williams; Jace; CeeJ; Cartier Dave; Lightskin Mac11; DJ Osh Kosh

Two-9 is an American hip hop collective from the East side of Atlanta, Georgia. The collective currently houses Key!, Curtis Williams, Jace, CeeJ, Cartier Dave (f/k/a Dav E), Lightskin Mac11 and DJ Osh Kosh. As well as the sub-groups Retro Su$h! (Jace & CeeJ) and FatKidsBrotha (Cartier Dave & Lightskin Mac11).

The group was founded by Williams and Key! in 2009. They are currently signed under Mike Will Made It's label EarDrummers Entertainment.

== Music career ==
=== 2012 ===
The group released a mixtape Two-9 Forever in July 2012. Since that release, Two9 has been working constantly. They released A Two9 Christmas with DJ Don Cannon on Christmas Day 2012.
They made ComplexMusic's list of "25 New Rappers to Watch Out For".

=== 2013 ===
Two-9 were part of the second "Trillectro Music Festival 2013" held in Washington with ASAP Ferg, Wale, Casey Veggies, Travis Scott and more.

== Discography ==
=== Studio album ===
FRVR was released February 9, 2017, by Interscope and Ear Drummer Records, and is available on CD and digital download.

=== Mixtapes ===
- Eastside Paradise (FatKidsBrotha) (2011)
- Trill Shit Only (Curtis Williams) (2011)
- Two-9 Forever (2012)
- A Two9 Christmas (2012)
- Kung Fu In Japan (Retro Sushi) (2012)
- Mothers Are The Blame (Key!) (2012)
- NOONEISREADY (Key! & TrapMoneyBenny) (2012)
- Half Forgotten Daydreams (Curtis Williams) (2013)
- Fathers Are The Curse (Key!) (2013)
- Eastside Paradise II (FatKidsBrotha) (2013)
- NOONEISREADY II (Key! & TrapMoneyBenny) (2014)
- Danco James (Curtis Williams) (2014)
- B4FRVR (2015)
- #AugustTwo9 EP (2015)
- #SeptemberTwo9 EP (2015)
- #OctoberTwo9 EP (2015)

=== Singles ===
- "Where The Money At? (prod. by Mike Will Made It)"
- "Everything (prod. by Mike Will Made It)"
- "3732 (Retro Sushi) ft. OJ Da Juiceman"
- "Free Waffles (Retro Sushi & Key!)"
- "Rackades"
- "By The Hour"
