= J. Cole production discography =

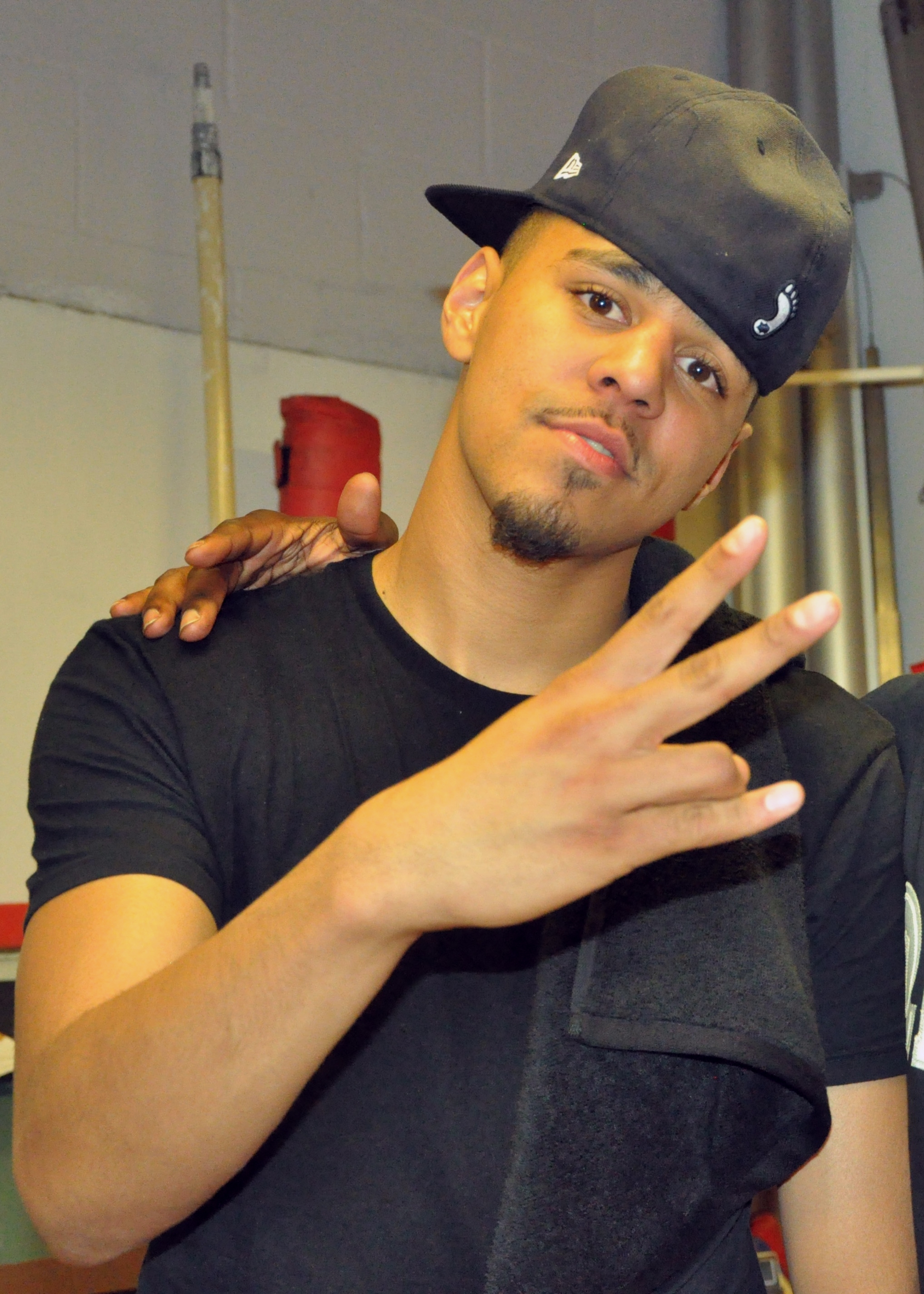
J. Cole in 2010

The following list is a discography of production by J. Cole, an American rapper. It includes a list of songs produced, co-produced and remixed by year, artist, album and title.

== Singles produced ==
List of singles, with selected chart positions and certifications, showing year released and album name
Title	Year	Peak chart positions						Certifications	Album
Title	Year	US	US R&B	US Rap	BEL (WA)	CAN	UK	Certifications	Album
"Lights Please" (J. Cole)	2009	109	—	—	—	—	—		The Warm Up
"Who Dat" (J. Cole)	2010	93	32	19	—	—	—		Cole World: The Sideline Story
"HiiiPoWeR" (Kendrick Lamar)	2011	—	—	—	—	—	—		Section.80
"Work Out" (J. Cole)	2011	13	10	3	—	32	158	RIAA: 2× Platinum; MC: Gold	Cole World: The Sideline Story
"Can't Get Enough" (J. Cole featuring Trey Songz)	2011	52	7	5	79	—	169	RIAA: Gold	Cole World: The Sideline Story
"Bad Girls Club" (Wale featuring J. Cole)	2011	—	—	—	—	—	—		—N/a
"Nobody's Perfect" (J. Cole featuring Missy Elliott)	2012	61	3	4	—	—	—		Cole World: The Sideline Story
"Miss America" (J. Cole)	2012	120	34	—	—	—	—		Born Sinner
"Power Trip" (J. Cole featuring Miguel)	2013	19	5	4	—	—	46	RIAA: Platinum	Born Sinner
"Crooked Smile" (J. Cole featuring TLC)	2013	27	12	9	—	—	114	RIAA: Gold	Born Sinner
"Forbidden Fruit" (J. Cole featuring Kendrick Lamar)	2013	—	46	—	—	—	—		Born Sinner
"She Knows" (J. Cole featuring Amber Coffman)	2013	90	24	11	—	—	75		Born Sinner
"Tribe" (Bas and J. Cole)	2018	—	48	—	—	—	—	BPI: Silver; RIAA: Platinum	Milky Way
"RNP" (Cordae featuring Anderson .Paak)	2019	115	—	—	—	84	—	RIAA: Gold; MC: Gold	The Lost Boy
"Two Tens" (Cordae featuring Anderson .Paak)	2023	—	—	—	—	74	—		Non-album single
"—" denotes a recording that did not chart or was not released in that territory.

== 2007 ==
=== J. Cole – The Come Up ===
- 01. "Intro”
- 02. "Simba"
- 09. "Split You Up"
- 10. "Plain"
- 14. "Lil' Ghetto Nigga"
- 16. "Carolina On My Mind" (featuring Deacon)
- 17. "Can't Cry"
  - Sample Credit: Millie Jackson – "(If Loving You Is Wrong) I Don't Want to Be Right"
- 18. "Goin' Off"
  - Sample Credit: The Controllers – "If Tomorrow Never Comes"
- 19. "Rags to Riches (At the Beep)"
  - Sample Credit: Roy Ayers – "Everybody Loves the Sunshine"

== 2009 ==
=== J. Cole – The Warm Up ===
- 01. "Intro"
- 02. "Welcome"
- 04. "Grown Simba"
- 06. "Lights Please"
  - Sample Credit: Dexter Wansel – "Theme From the Planets"
- 08. "I Get Up"
- 09. "World Is Empty"
  - Sample Credit: The Supremes – "My World Is Empty Without You"
- 10. "Dreams" (featuring Brandon Hines)
  - Sample Credit: Hank Crawford – "Wildflower"
- 12. "Dollar and a Dream II"
- 13. "Water Break" (Interlude)
- 15. "Get Away"
  - Sample Credit: Billy Stewart – "Cross My Heart"
- 17. "Ladies" (featuring Lee Fields & The Expressions)
  - Sample Credit: Lee Fields & The Expressions – "Ladies"
- 19. "The Badness" (featuring Omen)
- 20. "Hold It Down"
- 22. "Losing My Balance" (Bonus Track)
  - Sample Credit: Sara Tavares – "Balance"

Leftover

- 00. "Song for the Ville"
- 00. "I Got It"
- 00. "Serenade"
- 00. "I'm Comin"
- 00. "Show Me Somethin"

== 2010 ==
=== Rain – The Re-Up Mixtape ===
- 03. "Come Home to Me"

=== J. Cole – Friday Night Lights ===
- 01. "Intro"
- 02. "Too Deep for the Intro"
  - Sample Credit: Erykah Badu – "Didn't Cha Know?"
- 03. "Before I'm Gone"
- 05. "You Got It" (featuring Wale)
  - Sample Credit: Janelle Monáe – "Neon Valley Street"
- 07. "Enchanted" (featuring Omen) (co-produced with Omen)
- 08. "Blow Up"
  - Sample Credit: Focus – "Hocus Pocus"
- 09. "Higher"
- 12. "The Autograph"
  - Sample Credit: The Class-Set – "Julie"
- 14. "Cost Me a Lot"
  - Sample Credit: Billie Holiday – "My Man"
- 15. "Premeditated Murder"
- 16. "Home for the Holidays"
- 17. "Love Me Not"
  - Sample Credit: Stevie Wonder – "My Cherie Amour"
- 18. "See World" (co-produced with Elite)
  - Sample Credit: Earl Klugh – "Living Inside Your Love"
- 19. "Farewell"
  - Sample Credit: OutKast – "So Fresh, So Clean"

Leftover

- 00. "Unabomber"
- 00. "Good Game"
- 00. "On Top of the World" (featuring A.L.)
- 00. "Purple Rain"
- 00. "It Won't Be Long"

=== Young Chris – The Network 2 ===
- 09. "Still the Hottest" (featuring J. Cole)

=== DJ Whoo Kid – XXL 10 Freshman for ’10″ ===
- 07. "Who's World is This" (performed by J. Cole)

=== Voli – Glass Doors ===
- 02. "Sunrise" (featuring Elite) (co-produced with Voli)

=== Bun B – Trill OG ===
Leftover

- 00. "Bun B for President"

=== DJ Khaled – Victory ===
Leftover

- 00. "We On" (featuring J. Cole)

== 2011 ==
=== Fashawn – Higher Learning Vol. 2 ===
- 04. "Relaxation" (featuring J. Cole and Omen)
- 08. "Nothing for the Radio" (featuring J. Cole)
- 18. "Big Dreams"

=== XV – Zero Heroes ===
- 04. "Smallville"
  - Sample Credit: Smashing Pumpkins – "To Forgive"

Leftover

- 00. "Watch Me Go"

=== Kendrick Lamar – Section.80 ===
- 16. "HiiiPoWeR"

=== Rihanna – "S&M" ===
- A7. "S&M" (J. Cole Remix)

=== Fat Trel – April Foolz ===
- 19. "Live My Life"

=== Alex Haldi – The Glorification of Gangster ===
- 05. "Killers" (performed by J. Cole)

=== Voli – In the Meanwhile ===
- 18. "Midnight" (Bonus Track)

=== J. Cole – Cole World: The Sideline Story ===
- 01. "Intro"
- 02. "Dollar and a Dream III" (co-produced with Capsvl of The University)
  - Sample Credit: Yoko Shimomura – "Darkness of the Unknown"
- 04. "Lights Please"
  - Sample Credit: Dexter Wansel – "Theme From the Planets"
- 05. "Interlude"
- 06. "Sideline Story"
- 07. "Mr. Nice Watch" (featuring Jay-Z)
- 08. "Cole World"
- 10. "Lost Ones"
- 11. "Nobody's Perfect" (featuring Missy Elliott)
  - Sample Credit: Curtis Mayfield – "Think"
- 13. "Rise and Shine"
  - Sample Credit: Greg Dykes and The Synanon Choir – "Arise, Shine"
- 14. "God's Gift"
  - Sample Credit: Milton Nascimento – "Francisco"
- 15. "Breakdown"
  - Sample Credit: Eero Koivistoinen – "Bells"
- 16. "Work Out"
  - Sample Credit: Paula Abdul – "Straight Up"
- 17. "Who Dat" (Bonus Track) (co-produced with Elite)
  - Sample Credit: New Hope – "Godofallofus"
- 18. "Daddy's Little Girl" (Bonus Track)

=== Wale – Ambition ===
Leftover

- 00. "Bad Girls Club" (featuring J. Cole)

=== Elite – Awaken ===
- 11. "Cycles"

== 2012 ==
=== 360 – Everywhere and Back ===
- 09. "What Goes Up"

=== King Mez – My Everlasting Zeal ===
- 06. "The Allure" (featuring Drey Skonie)

=== Trae, A.B.N. and Renegadez – Welcome 2 the Streets ===
- 12. "Roll Call" (featuring J. Cole)

=== DJ Khaled – Kiss the Ring ===
- 05. "They Ready" (featuring J. Cole, Big K.R.I.T. and Kendrick Lamar)
  - Sample Credit: Willie Hutch – "That's What I Call Loving You"

=== Sha Stimuli – The 9.2.5 EP ===
- 01. "Two Weeks Notice"

=== Kendrick Lamar – good kid, m.A.A.d city ===
Leftover

- 00. "The Jig Is Up (Dump'n)" (co-produced with Canei Finch)

=== Fabolous – The S.O.U.L. Tape 2 ===
- 07. "Louis Vuitton" (featuring J. Cole)

=== Bali – The Hardway ===
- 13. "I Don't See 'Em"

== 2013 ==
=== J. Cole – Truly Yours ===
- 02. "Crunch Time"
- 03. "Rise Above"
- 04. "Tears for ODB"

=== Funkmaster Flex – Who You Mad At? Me or Yourself? ===
- 10. "Maine on Fire"

=== J. Cole – Truly Yours 2 ===
- 01. "Cole Summer"
- 03. "Chris Tucker" (featuring 2 Chainz) (co-produced by Canei Finch)
- 04. "Head Bussa"
- 05. "Cousins" (featuring Bas) (produced with Ron Gilmore)

=== Talib Kweli – Prisoner of Conscious ===
- 15. "It Only Gets Better" (featuring Marsha Ambrosious)

=== Bas – Quarter Water Raised Me Vol. II ===
- 08. "Cousins" (featuring J. Cole)

Leftover

- 00. "The Season"

=== J. Cole – Born Sinner ===
- 01. "Villuminati"
  - Sample Credit: "Juicy" by The Notorious B.I.G.
- 03. "LAnd of the Snakes"
  - Sample Credit: "Da Art of Storytellin' (Pt. 1)" by OutKast
- 04. "Power Trip" (featuring Miguel)
  - Sample Credit: "No More" by Hubert Laws
- 06. "Trouble"
- 07. "Runaway"
- 08. "She Knows" (featuring Amber Coffman)
- 09. "Rich Niggaz"
- 11. "Forbidden Fruit" (featuring Kendrick Lamar)
  - Sample Credit: "Mystic Brew" by Ronnie Foster
- 12. "Chaining Day"
- 14. "Crooked Smile" (featuring TLC) (produced with Elite)
- 15. "Let Nas Down"
- 16. "Born Sinner" (featuring James Fauntleroy) (produced with Elite)
- 17. "Miss America" (Bonus Track)
  - Sample Credit: Rue Royale – "Flightline"
- 18. "New York Times" (featuring 50 Cent and Bas) (Bonus Track)
- 19. "Is She Gon Pop" (Bonus Track)
- 20. "Niggaz Know" (Bonus Track)
- 21. "Sparks Will Fly" (Bonus Track)

=== DJ Khaled – Suffering from Success ===
- 11. "Hell's Kitchen" (J. Cole featuring Bas) (additional production by Canei Finch)

== 2014 ==
=== Various artists – Revenge of the Dreamers ===
- 01. "Lil' Niggaz" (snippet) (performed by J. Cole)
- 05. "Revenge of the Dreamers" (performed by J. Cole)
- 09. "Bitchez" (J. Cole featuring Bas and Omen)
- 10. "May the Bitter Man Win" (Treasure Davis featuring J. Cole)

=== Ab-Soul – These Days... ===
- 11. "Sapiosexual"

=== Elijah Blake – Drift EP ===
- 03. "Vendetta" (featuring J. Cole)

=== J. Cole – 2014 Forest Hills Drive ===
- 01. "Intro" (additional production by Ron Gilmore)
- 02. "January 28th" (additional production by Nick Paradise & Dre Charles for Team Titans)
- 03. "Wet Dreamz"
- 06. "Fire Squad" (additional production by Vinylz)
- 07. "St. Tropez"
- 08. "G.O.M.D."
- 09. "No Role Modelz" (produced by Phonix Beats, additional production by J. Cole)
- 10. "Hello" (co-produced with Pop Wansel and Jproof)
- 11. "Apparently"
- 13 "Note to Self" (co-produced with Ron Gilmore)

== 2015 ==
=== Voli – The Wall ===
Leftover

- 00. "Sound of Love" (featuring J. Cole) (co-produced with Voli)

=== Trae tha Truth – Tha Truth ===
- 08. "Children of Men" (featuring J. Cole and Ink)

=== Omen – Elephant Eyes ===
Leftover

- 00. "Undercover"

=== Janet Jackson – Unbreakable ===
- 09. "No Sleeep" (featuring J. Cole) (co-produced with Jimmy Jam & Terry Lewis and Janet Jackson)

=== A Tribe Called Quest – People's Instinctive Travels and the Paths of Rhythm (25th Anniversary Edition) ===
- 17. "Can I Kick It?" (J. Cole Remix)

=== Dreamville – Revenge of the Dreamers II ===
- 01. "Folgers Crystals" (co-Produced by Elite)

=== Pusha T – King Push – Darkest Before Dawn: The Prelude ===
- 05. "M.P.A." (featuring Kanye West, A$AP Rocky and The-Dream) (co-produced by Kanye West and Che Pope)

== 2016 ==
=== Spillage Village – Bears Like This Too Much ===
- 04. "Voodoo" (performed by EarthGang) (co-produced by Childish Major)
- 11. "Willow Tree" (performed by J.I.D, JordxnBryant, and EarthGang) (produced By Elite and Ron Gilmore, Additional Production by J. Cole)

=== J. Cole – 4 Your Eyez Only ===
- 01. "For Whom the Bell Tolls"
- 02. "Immortal"
- 03. "Deja Vu"
- 04. "Ville Mentality"
- 05. "She's Mine Pt. 1"
- 06. "Change"
- 07. "Neighbors"
- 08. "Foldin Clothes"
- 09. "She's Mine Pt. 2"
- 10. "4 Your Eyez Only"

Production credit on all 10 songs on the album

Leftover

- 00. "Everybody Dies"

== 2017 ==
=== JID – The Never Story ===
- 05. "D/vision" (featuring EarthGang)
- 12. "LAUDER"

=== Logic – Everybody ===
- 13. "AfricAryaN" (featuring Neil Degrasse Tyson)

=== Childish Major – Woo$ah ===
- 04. "Supply Luh"

=== Salomon Faye – King Salomon ===
- 03. "Live and Learn" (featuring J. Cole and Eryn Allen Kane)

== 2018 ==
=== Cozz – Effected ===
- 13. "Zendaya" (featuring J. Cole)

=== Kill Edward ===
- 00. "Tidal Wave"

=== J. Cole – KOD ===
- 01. "Intro"
- 02. "KOD"
- 03. "Photograph"
- 04. "The Cut Off" (featuring Kill Edward) (co-produced by BLVK)
- 05. "ATM"
- 06. "Motiv8"
- 08. "BRACKETS"
- 09. "Once an Addict (Interlude)" (additional production (bassline) by Ron Gilmore)
- 10. "Friends" (featuring Kill Edward)
- 11. "Window Pain (Outro)"
- 12. "1985 (Intro to The Fall Off)"

=== Mac Miller – Swimming ===
- 02. "Hurt Feelings" (additional production by Jon Brion and Dev Hynes)

=== Bas – Milky Way ===
- 01. "Icarus" (featuring Ari Lennox) (co-produced by Ron Gilmore and Meez)
- 02. "Front Desk" (co-produced by Jay Kurzweil and Ron Gilmore)
- 03. "Tribe" (featuring J. Cole) (co-produced by Childish Major)
- 04. "Boca Raton" (featuring ASAP Ferg) (produced by Sango, additional production by Cedric Brown and J. Cole)
- 06. "Purge" (co-produced by Ron Gilmore and Christo)
- 07. "Fragrance" (featuring Correy C) (produced by Cedric Brown, additional production by Meez, Ron Gilmore, TEC BEATZ and J. Cole)
- 10. "Sanufa" (Additional Production By Ron Gilmore)

Leftover

- 00. "Pinball II" (featuring Correy C) (produced with Cedric Brown, and ClickNPress)

=== Wale – Free Lunch EP ===
- 04. "My Boy (Freestyle)" (featuring J. Cole)

=== Swizz Beatz – Poison ===
Executive Producer with Swizz Beatz

=== JID – DiCaprio 2 ===
- 09. "Skrawberries" (featuring BJ The Chicago Kid) (arrangement by Mac Miller and horns by Masego)

== 2019 ==
=== Dreamville – Revenge of the Dreamers III ===
- 16. "Middle Child" (produced with T-Minus)

=== Ari Lennox – Shea Butter Baby ===
- 08. "Facetime" (produced with Craig Brockman)

=== Cordae - The Lost Boy ===
- 06. "RNP" (featuring Anderson Paak)

=== EarthGang – Mirrorland ===
- 01. "LaLa Challenge" (produced by Lido and Olu, additional production by J. Cole)

=== Young Thug – So Much Fun ===
- 01. "Mannequin Challenge" (featuring Juice Wrld) (produced by T-Minus and J. Cole)

== 2020 ==
=== J. Cole – Lewis Street ===
- 01. "The Climb Back"
- 02. "Lion King on Ice" (co-produced with JetsonMade and T-Minus)

=== J. Cole – N/A ===
- "Be Free"

== 2021 ==
=== J. Cole – The Off-Season ===
- 02. "Amari" (co-produced by Timbaland, Sucuki and T-Minus)
- 03. "My Life" (featuring 21 Savage and Morray) (co-produced by Jake One & Wu10)

Sample Credit: Styles P & Pharoahe Monch – "The Life"

- 04. "Applying Pressure"
- 06 "100 Mil" (featuring Bas) (co-produced by T-Minus)
- 08. "Let Go My Hand" (featuring Bas and 6LACK (co-produced by DJ Dahi & Wu10)
- 09. "Interlude" (co-produced by T-Minus and Tommy Parker)
- 10. "The Climb Back"
- 11. "Close"

=== Lute – Gold Mouf ===
- 14. "Outta Sight" (co-produced by Wu10, The Nukez, "Pooh" & "Big Dho")
- 15. "Finding Self" (co-produced by Elite, Dreamlife, DJ Pain, The Nukez, "Pooh" & "Big Dho")
- 16. "Livin'" (co-produced by The Nukez, "Pooh", Hollywood JB, Soul Professa & "Big Dho")
- 18. "Luther's Freestyle" (co-produced by The Nukez, "Pooh" & "Big Dho")
- 19. "Run It Back" (co-produced by The Nukez, "Pooh" & "Big Dho")

=== Cozz – Fortunate EP ===
- 07. "Fortunate" (co-produced by Cedric Brown, Kurzweil & T-Minus)

== 2022 ==
=== Dreamville – D-Day: A Gangsta Grillz Mixtape ===
- 03. "Lifestyle" – Bas with ASAP Ferg
- 05. "Coming Down" – Ari Lennox (co-produced by DZL and Wu10)

=== Ari Lennox – Age/Sex/Location ===
- 01. "POF" (co-produced by DZL and Wu10)

== 2023 ==
=== Summer Walker – Clear 2: Soft Life ===
- 01. "To Summer, From Cole" (Audio Hug)" [featuring J. Cole] (co-produced by Wu10)

=== Mike Will Made It – Michael ===
- "Blood Moon" (featuring Lil Uzi Vert) (co-produced by Mike Will Made It & Myles Harris)

=== Bas – We Only Talk About Real Shit When We're Fucked Up ===
- 15. "Dr. O'blivion" (co-produced by Galimatias)

== 2024 ==
=== J. Cole – Might Delete Later ===
- 01. Pricey (featuring Ari Lennox, Young Dro, and Gucci Mane) (co-produced by T-Minus, DZL, Daoud and Wu10)

=== Cordae – The Crossroads ===
- 04. "Summer Drop" (featuring Anderson Paak)
- 17. "Two Tens" (featuring Anderson Paak) (co-produced by Dem Jointz)

=== J. Cole – The Fall Off ===
- 00. "Port Antonio" (co-produced by DZL and Omen)

=== J. Cole – 2014 Forest Hills Drive (10 Year Anniversary Edition) ===
- 01. "Home Soon"
- 02. "Die Together"
- 04. "Winter Wonderland"
- 05. "Keep Heaven Dancing"
- 07. "Black Man in Hollywood"
- 08. "Obviously"

== 2026 ==
=== PFG – Never Say Die ===
- 01. "Mighty Mouse" (featuring J. Cole)
- 02. "Mr. Biggs
- 03. "In Rotation Left"
- 04. "End of the Day"
- 05. "Whole House" (featuring J. Cole)
- 06. "910 We Get Active"
- 07. "Murk Mob"
- 08. "Twins Forever"
- 09. "Handguns & Hang Gliders"
- 10. "Twins Forever" (remix) (featuring J. Cole)
