= Truly Yours =

Truly Yours may refer to:

- Truly yours, a valediction
- Truly Yours (Kool G Rap & DJ Polo song), 1989
- Truly Yours (The Spinners song), 1966
- Truly Yours (EP), a 2013 EP by J. Cole

== See also ==
- Truly Yours 2, a 2013 EP by J. Cole
