= Nate Jones On Bass =

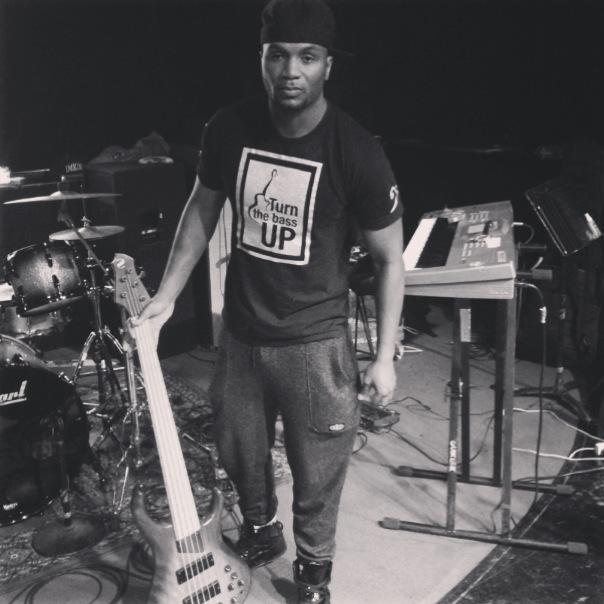
Nate Jones On Bass

Nate Jones, professionally known as "Nate Jones On Bass" or simply “NJOB,” is an American bassist, songwriter, and producer. He has worked with many recognized names in the music industry, sharing the stage with iconic established acts including Stevie Wonder, Jay Z, Justin Timberlake, Usher, J.Lo, LL Cool J, Chris Brown, and Trey Songz. Jones has also graced the big screen by playing bass in the 2008 film Cadillac Records, which featured Beyoncé, Gabrielle Union, and Cedric the Entertainer, among other Hollywood talent. In addition to playing bass, he has also scored for film and television. His professional performances include television appearances on BET, Jimmy Kimmel Live, VH1’s Save The Music, The Wendy Williams Show, Billboard Music Awards, Dick Clark's New Year's Rockin' Eve, and the ESPN Sports Humanitarian Awards. He's produced live shows as well as studio recordings for artists and served as musical director for various bands ranging from straight ahead jazz to R&B, soul, gospel and hip-hop. Nate is credited as bassist and additional producer of “Let Nas Down” by J. Cole on the 2013 album Born Sinner. Jones' work can also be heard on recordings like "In the Morning," "Apparently", "Runaway", "January 28th" by J. Cole. Nate recorded with Swiss Beatz for the Epix series Godfather of Harlem; "Tequila" by Earth Gang; and "Static" by Ari Lennox. On August 4, 2022, Nate Jones performed at Carnegie Hall with D-Nice for Club Quarantine Live alongside guests Jadakiss, Styles P, The Lox, Ashanti, Slick Rick, Hezekiah Walker and Queen Latifah. In 2020 at the height of the Covid-19 shutdown, Nate launched the clothing line “Musicians Are Essential” to raise awareness on the necessary creative healing that musicians bring to the world, especially during history’s darkest moments.

== Early life and career ==
Nate was born in the Bronx, New York City where his interest in music began at a young age picking up both bass and drums in church. He developed his technique with formal training at the Bloomingdale School of Music in New York, where he played with the jazz band and gospel choir. He pursued his higher education at State University of New York at Purchase where he earned a Bachelor of Fine Arts in Jazz Performance. Following his time in this music program at SUNY Purchase, Nate paid his dues by working with many musicians around NYC from cover bands to local open mics. Before joining the Trey Songz Experience, early in his career Nate toured with R&B singer Lyfe Jennings as musical director, and as part of jazz saxophonist Mike Phillips' band. Over the course of his career as a touring musician, NJOB has traveled internationally playing on six continents in over twenty countries.

== Discography ==
=== With Mike Phillips ===
- M.P.3 featuring vocals from Stevie Wonder (Hidden Beach, 2010)

=== With J. Cole ===
- Cole World: The Sideline Story (Roc Nation, 2011)
- Born Sinner (Dreamville Records, 2013)
- 2014 Forest Hills Drive (Columbia Records, 2014)

=== Singles ===
- "Everybody Say", Trey Songz To Whom It May Concern (2016)
- "Static", Ari Lennox Shea Butter Baby (Dreamville Records, 2019)

With Various Artists

- "Black River" ft. Cruel Youth, Harlem Is Mine (Godfather of Harlem, 2019)
- "Tequila" ft. T-Pain, EarthGang, Mirrorland (Dreamville Records, 2019)

== Other career ventures ==
In addition to playing bass, Nate Jones has been the front man of the open mic Taste The Stage, held at various venues in NYC, since 2005. In 2008, he joined the cast of Cadillac Records as a part of the band of Etta James played by Beyoncé. In 2013, he launched his clothing brand Turn The Bass Up, which promoted his first solo single of the same name released on June 3, 2014.

== Appearances and Performances ==
- 2007 - BET's 106 & Park with Lyfe Jennings
- 2008 - MTV Day with Estelle in Genoa Italy
- 2008 - Nationwide Mercury Prize with Estelle at Grosvenor House
- 2008 - V Festival with Estelle
- 2008 - Vodafone Live Music Awards 2008 with Estelle in London
- 2008 - appeared in Cadillac Records as part of Etta James' Recording Group (uncredited)
- 2009 - Centric's Lyric Café with Eric Benet and Mike Phillips
- 2011 - Late Night with David Letterman with Young Jeezy
- 2010 - MTV's Unplugged with Trey Songz
- 2010 - Trey Songz: My Moment (Series)
- 2010 - BET's 106 & Park with Trey Songz
- 2012 - Later... With Jools Holland, with Trey Songz
- 2019 - New Year's Rockin' Eve with Ryan Seacrest; with JLO
- 2019 - CBS The Early Show with Emily King
- 2022 - Coke Studio Session, “A Kind of Magic" with Ari Lennox

== Tours ==
- BMW Pop Jazz Live Tour with Mike Phillips (2006)
- Show Me Tour with John Legend (2007)
- The Roots and Gym Class Heroes Tour with Estelle (2008)
- Support Tour with Wyclef Jean (2008)
- Lyfe Jennings: Baby I'm A Star Tour (2008)
- Lyfe experience Tour with Lyfe Jennings
- The JYP Tour Live at Madison Square Garden (2008)
- JYP Tour Korea
- Minority Report comedy tour with BET alum Joe Clair (2009)
- Jay Z's The Blueprint 3 Tour with Trey Songz (2009)
- BET 106 & Park Live Tour with Trey Songz, Mario, and Day 26 (2009)
- Passion Pain and Pleasure Tour with Trey Songz and Monica (2010)
- OMG Tour with Usher, Miguel, and Trey Songz (2010)
- Love Faces Tour with Trey Songz (2011)
- Chapter V World Tour with Trey Songz, Miguel and Elle Varner (2011)
