= Power Trip (song) =

2013 song by J. Cole featuring Miguel

Single by J. Cole featuring Miguel

from the album Born Sinner
- Released: February 14, 2013
- Recorded: 2012
- Genre: Hip hop; R&B
- Length: 4:00
- Label: Roc Nation; Columbia; Dreamville
- Songwriters: Jermaine Cole; Hubert Laws
- Producer: J. Cole

J. Cole singles chronology
"This Time" (2012)	"Power Trip" (2013)	"Crooked Smile" (2013)

Miguel singles chronology
"Do You..." (2012)	"Power Trip" (2013)	"How Many Drinks?" (2013)

"Power Trip" is a song by American rapper J. Cole featuring American singer Miguel. It was released on February 14, 2013 as the lead single from J. Cole's second studio album, Born Sinner (2013). The song was written and produced by J. Cole himself, with Hubert Laws receiving songwriting credits for the sampling of his song "No More".

== Background ==
The single marked the second collaboration between Cole and Miguel, following their moderate hit single, "All I Want Is You". Soon after releasing a five track extended play, titled Truly Yours, Cole released "Power Trip" on Valentine's Day. When asked about the single, Cole explained:

"The most exciting part about that song ['Power Trip'] and the reason why we went with it is that it sounds like nothing that's out. It was between that, and this other record that's like, maybe a bigger record, but 'Power Trip' had that newer sound. Like with 'Power Trip,' absolutely you couldn't point to any song on the radio and be like, 'Oh, this sounds like that'…everything from the beat to the way that I'm flowing, you've never really heard me so "sleepy". I really did them verses in my crib and just loved the way they felt."

Cole originally sang the song's chorus himself, until a meeting with Jay-Z, who suggested that Cole reach out to Miguel. When J. Cole played it for Jay-Z, his first words were, 'Yo, you should get Miguel on this,'" Cole recalls.

== Music and lyrics ==
The hip hop / R&B song is a continuation of his song "Dreams" from his mixtape The Warm Up, in which he obsesses over the girl and devises his plan to kill her boyfriend. J. Cole speaks about his "longest crush ever". He later stated his hopes for the song: "I've always wanted to use my voice to shift culture, even if just a millimeter."

== Critical reception ==
"Power Trip" was met with generally positive reviews from music critics. NMB of XXL praised the song, as one of the album's strongest tracks along with "Crooked Smile" and "Let Nas Down". Phillip Mlynar of Spin said, "there's a more appealing, mild-mannered side to Cole that shines when he writes songs about relationships: The Miguel-abetted "Power Trip", especially, teeters on the edge of blooming into a melancholic OutKast single. Joven Haye of DJBooth.net praised the song's production, also saying "The captivating production brings out some savvy-storytelling from Cole, which when paired alongside one of the catchiest hooks of the year, solidifies the pair’s flawless chemistry."

Jay Soul of RapReviews.com also praised the song calling it, "a single that fits excellently within the structure of Born Sinner – the last verse of the previous song leads cleverly into it, and it's not by any means dumbed down." Francesca D'Arcy-Orga of PopMatters said, "It's one of the catchiest songs on the album. Interestingly, it’s a song that wouldn’t go amiss at all on Cole’s first album and is very similar in style to "Work Out", showing that Cole is still sticking to what he knows best regardless of whether Nas likes it or not." Corban Golbe of Pitchfork Media stated that, "once in a while he can create something catchy – the Miguel-featuring "Power Trip" almost seems like it was designed in a lab for radio rotation." Complex ranked "Power Trip" number eight, on their list of the 50 best songs of 2013. HipHopDX said, ""Power Trip" may actually be one of the best radio-friendly rap songs of the last five years." XXL would end up naming it one of the top five hip hop songs of 2013. The song was also nominated for Best Rap/Sung Collaboration at the 56th Annual Grammy Awards.

=== Awards and nominations ===
Year	Ceremony	Award	Result
2013	BET Hip Hop Awards	"Track of the Year"	Nominated
2013	BET Hip Hop Awards	Best Collabo, Duo or Group	Nominated
2014	Grammy Awards (56th)	Best Rap/Sung Collaboration	Nominated

== Chart performance ==
The song debuted at number three on the US Billboard Hot R&B/Hip-Hop Songs chart, selling 210,000 units, according to Nielsen SoundScan. It took off online as well, skyrocketing to more than 300,000 plays on Cole's SoundCloud page in less than a day. The song was sent to urban contemporary radio on February 19, 2013. The song has since peaked at number 19 on the US Billboard Hot 100, marking his second top 20 single in the US, and number 46 on the UK Singles Chart, becoming his highest-charting single there at the time. The song also became a top five hit on the US Hot R&B/Hip-Hop Songs chart and the US Rap Songs chart, peaking at number five and number three, respectively. On July 15, 2013, the single was certified platinum by the Recording Industry Association of America (RIAA) for sales of over a million digital copies in the United States.

== Music video ==
In an interview on March 3, 2013 with radio personality Big Tigger, J. Cole said the visual to his new single "Power Trip" will be shot next week in his hometown of Fayetteville, North Carolina. The video treatment will be J. Cole's very own idea, which he mentioned in a previous interview that the idea came to mind as he was creating the song. On April 8, 2013, along with announcing the release date for Born Sinner, he announced that the video for "Power Trip" would be released the following day, which it was on April 9. J. Cole served as creative director on the video, and it was shot and directed by Nabil Elderkin and Mike Piscitelli.

The video begins with a strip-club scene, and then it follows J. Cole and one of his friends as they wait outside of a girl's house (Dinah Sade) – clearly the one who he has been up all night pining about with "constant drinking and love songs." Soon, we learn that this tank-top-clad girl has a boyfriend: Cole's collaborator, Miguel. As that sequence fades away, we are left to wonder where Cole and his friend are driving to and why there are pieces of wood and plastic bags tied to the top of their car. A suspicious cop pulls them over, but finding nothing besides a shovel in the trunk, he lets them on their way. It is not until the duo finally park in the woods and remove the items from the top of the car that we understand the rapper's obsession has actually led to murder.

== Charts ==
=== Weekly charts ===
Chart (2013)	Peak position
Belgium (Ultratip Bubbling Under Flanders)	56
UK Singles (Official Charts)	46
UK Hip Hop/R&B (Official Charts)	9
US Billboard Hot 100	19
US Pop Airplay (Billboard)	35
US Hot R&B/Hip-Hop Songs (Billboard)	5
US Rhythmic Airplay (Billboard)	2

=== Year-end charts ===
Chart (2013)	Position
US Billboard Hot 100	48
US Hot R&B/Hip-Hop Songs (Billboard)	11
US Rap Songs (Billboard)	8
US Rhythmic (Billboard)	4

== Certifications ==
Region	Certification	Certified units/sales
Australia (ARIA)	Gold	35,000^{‡}
New Zealand (RMNZ)	4× Platinum	120,000^{‡}
United Kingdom (BPI)	Platinum	600,000^{‡}
United States (RIAA)	Platinum	1,000,000^{‡}
^{‡} Sales+streaming figures based on certification alone.

== Radio and release history ==
Region	Date	Format	Label
United States	February 14, 2013	Digital download	Roc Nation; Columbia
United States	February 19, 2013	Urban contemporary radio	Roc Nation; Columbia
United States	February 26, 2013	Rhythmic contemporary radio	Roc Nation; Columbia
United States	May 21, 2013	Mainstream radio	Roc Nation; Columbia
