= Killing of Aiyana Jones =

2010 police shooting of a child in Detroit

Aiyana Jones
- Aiyana Jones in 2009
- Born: Aiyana MoNay Stanley-Jones; July 20, 2002; Detroit, Michigan, U.S.
- Died: May 16, 2010 (aged 7); Detroit, Michigan, U.S.
- Cause of death: Gunshot wound to the neck
- Resting place: Trinity Cemetery; 5210 Mount Elliott Street; Detroit, Michigan 48211
- Other name: Aiyana Stanley-Jones
- Occupation: Student
- Known for: Shot in police raid
- Parents: Charles Jones (father); Dominika Stanley (mother)
- Relatives: Mertilla Jones (grandmother)

Aiyana Mo'Nay Stanley-Jones (July 20, 2002 – May 16, 2010) was a seven-year-old African American girl from Detroit's East Side who was shot in the neck and killed by police officer Joseph Weekley during a raid conducted by the Detroit Police Department's Special Response Team. The team was targeting a suspect in the apartment a floor above Jones' on May 16, 2010. Her death drew national media attention and led U.S. representative John Conyers to ask U.S. attorney general Eric Holder for a federal investigation into the incident.

Officer Joseph Weekley was charged in connection with Jones' killing. In October 2011, he was charged with involuntary manslaughter and reckless endangerment with a gun. Weekley's first trial ended in a mistrial in June 2013. His retrial began in September 2014. On October 3, the judge, Cynthia Gray Hathaway, dismissed the involuntary manslaughter charge against Weekley, leaving him on trial for only one charge: recklessly discharging a firearm. On October 10, the second trial ended in another mistrial. On January 28, 2015, a prosecutor dropped the last remaining charge against Weekley, ensuring there would not be a third trial.

== Background ==
On May 14, 2010, Southeastern High School senior Jerean "Blake" Nobels was shot and killed near the intersection of Mack and Beniteau streets on Detroit's east side. By the end of the following day, police had identified Chauncey Owens as a suspect in Blake's death and obtained a warrant to search 4054 Lillibridge St, where Owens was believed to be hiding.

The building was a duplex; Owens's girlfriend LaKrysta Sanders lived in the upstairs apartment, while her mother and Aiyana Jones' grandmother, Mertilla Jones, lived in the downstairs apartment. At the time of the incident Aiyana Jones was asleep on the couch in the front room of the downstairs apartment. Owens was in the upstairs apartment.

An A&E reality TV television crew was accompanying the police Special Response Team gathering footage for The First 48. Weekley had been featured on another A&E police reality show, Detroit SWAT.

Two weeks prior to the incident, a Detroit police officer had been killed in the line of duty while attempting to arrest a suspect.

Owens was later found guilty of Blake's murder.

=== People involved ===
Aiyana Jones (July 20, 2002 – May 16, 2010) was the daughter of Charles Jones and Dominika Stanley. She was one of three children of the couple and had four half-siblings.

== Death ==
According to press reports, police were on the scene by 12:40 a.m. on Sunday, May 16, 2010. In an attempt to distract the occupants, police fired a flash grenade through the front window of the lower apartment, where Aiyana Jones was sleeping. Officer Weekley claimed that the flash grenade subsequently blinded his view of the person on the couch in the living room.

Police officers, bystanders, and residents of the home disagreed about the events that followed. According to reports, seconds after entering the house, Weekley fired the fatal shot. He pushed his way inside, protected by a ballistic shield. Weekley claimed Aiyana Jones' paternal grandmother, Mertilla Jones, attempted to slap his MP5 submachine gun, causing it to fire. The bullet struck Aiyana killing her. Weekley stated, "A woman inside grabbed my gun. It fired. The bullet hit a child."

Mertilla Jones said she reached for her granddaughter when the grenade came through the window, not for the officer's gun, because the flash grenade had set the child on fire. She said she made no contact with any officers.

After the shot was fired, Weekley reported to his sergeant that a woman inside had grabbed for his gun. Police arrested Mertilla, administered tests for drugs and gunpowder, and released her Sunday morning. At Weekley's retrial in 2014, it was disclosed that Mertilla's fingerprints were not found on Weekley's gun. Geoffrey Fieger, the family's lawyer, said the police fired the shot that struck Aiyana from outside the home, possibly through the open front door.

Weekley was a member of Detroit's SWAT team and a frequent subject on the A&E Network (A&E), whose film crews were also filming the investigation for the documentary TV series The First 48.

Chauncey Owens, the suspect whom the raid was intended to apprehend and boyfriend of Aiyana's aunt LaKrystal Sanders, was found in the upper-floor apartment of the duplex and surrendered without incident.

== Aftermath ==
After a one-year internal and federal investigation, on October 4, 2011, a grand jury indicted Weekley on involuntary manslaughter and reckless endangerment with a gun. He admitted in his first trial that, "It's my gun that shot and killed a 7-year-old girl." His trial was scheduled for October and finally took place in June 2013 but resulted in a deadlocked jury. A fresh trial was scheduled for December 2013, but actually began in September 2014.

Allison Howard, a videographer and photographer with A&E who was also present at the raid, was indicted on obstruction of justice and perjury for allegedly "lying to prosecutors about copying, showing or giving video footage that she shot of the raid to third parties causing a significant delay in the investigation of the case". In June 2013, Howard pleaded "no contest" to the obstruction of justice charge, and the perjury charge was dismissed. Allison Howard was sentenced to two years of probation in July 2013, and fined $2,000.

=== Trial ===
Weekley's first trial ended in a mistrial in June 2013. Wayne County Circuit Judge Cynthia Gray Hathaway presided over the case. Aiyana's case would be the longest presiding case that Hathaway had in more than 20 years of being on the bench.

=== Retrial ===
Weekley's retrial started in September 2014. He was charged with involuntary manslaughter and "negligent firing of a weapon causing death".

On the second day of trial, September 24, LaKrystal Sanders, who lived on the upper floor of the house where Aiyana was killed, testified. Sanders was Aiyana Jones's paternal aunt, the girlfriend of Chauncey Owens, and the daughter of Mertilla Jones. While Sanders was on the stand, Judge Cynthia Hathaway told her that she (Sanders) was being "disrespectful." Aiyana's mother Dominika Stanley, and paternal grandmother Mertilla testified, and both had "emotional outbursts." After the grandmother's outburst, the judge ordered the jury out of the room and the grandmother was escorted from the court room screaming. Because of Mertilla Jones's outburst, the judge stopped the trial until September 29.

On September 29, Weekley's lawyer asked the judge for a mistrial, citing Mertilla Jones's conduct on the stand the week before. The judge denied the motion for mistrial, saying she believed the jury could still be "impartial." However, the judge also said if Mertilla Jones and the other relatives continued to have outbursts on the stand, then she would declare a mistrial.

On October 3, the judge dismissed the involuntary manslaughter charge against Weekley. On October 10, the judge declared a mistrial due to jury deadlock. On January 28, 2015, county prosecutor Kym Worthy dismissed the last remaining charge against Weekley, the misdemeanor of 'careless discharge of a firearm causing death'. Weekley did not go to a third trial.

Jurors

The jury claimed that race did not affect the decision of their verdict. The jury stall resulted in seven voting "not guilty" and five voting "guilty".

== Funeral ==
Aiyana Jones' funeral was held in the Second Ebenezer Church on May 22, 2010, in Detroit. Reverend Al Sharpton gave the eulogy. Charles Jones, Aiyana's father, wore a black suit, pink tie and pink handkerchief in remembrance of his daughter as pink was her favorite color. The casket was white and was afterwards driven to the grave by horse-drawn carriage. She was buried on the grounds.

== Controversy ==
=== Lawsuits ===
A civil rights lawsuit questioned Weekley's account of the incident, claiming the grenade had gone through the window and struck Aiyana. The lawsuit asserts that police were outside of the home where they "blindly fired random shots," and one of the bullets fatally struck the 7-year-old child in the neck. The lawsuit charges police officers Joseph Weekley and Robert Rowe (who is claimed to have thrown the grenade) for the unlawful use of excessive force. Furthermore, the police department and unnamed supervisors of the Special Response Team in the city of Detroit were being sued for violating the civil rights of Aiyana Jones through their training and policy procedure. The family is seeking $7.5 million in damages and a jury trial conceded by the court filing. Two days after Jones's death, on May 18, 2010, attorney Geoffrey Fieger filed lawsuits on behalf of her family against A&E and the police.

==== Fieger video claim ====
Attorney Fieger claimed that footage, from an undisclosed source, showed that the lethal bullet came from outside the home, rather than inside, as police said. A spokesman for city police demanded that Fieger share the tape's contents with Michigan State Police investigators. Fieger responded by saying he does not have the supposed video, which he claims was made by the A&E Network reality show The First 48. Michigan State Police Detective Tawana Powell testified during the 2014 trial that the investigation discovered that the video Fieger was talking about did not exist.

==== Weekley follow-up ====
The Detroit Police Department had decided to withdraw Officer Weekley from active duty shortly after the shooting on May 16, 2010. On April 2, 2015, nearly five years following Jones's death, Officer Weekley was returned to active duty as a Detroit police officer in the Criminal Investigations Bureau (he had been on the Special Response Team). Police Chief James Craig stated, "He'll be in a limited duty capacity. He won't be in the field."

== In popular media ==
In September 2013, J. Cole published a music video dedicated to Jones for his song "Crooked Smile", featuring TLC on YouTube.

== Rally ==
On the sixth anniversary in 2016, a gathering was held at the feet of the Spirit of Detroit statue in front of the Coleman A. Young Municipal Center in Detroit. On July 20, 2016, Detroit police arrested six unknown individuals for chaining themselves to a precinct of the Detroit Police Department, their protest honoring Jones. The Detroit chapter of the Black Youth Project 100 (BYP100) and Black Lives Matter Detroit organized the rally on what would have been her 14th birthday. Protestors pleaded for the termination of Officer Weekley as he had been selected to co-chair the Detroit Police Department's Committee on Race and Equality. Grandmother Mertilla Jones said, "Accountability needs to be expected from cases like this, because cops can't keep killing people and getting away with it."

== See also ==
- List of unarmed African Americans killed by law enforcement officers in the United States
- List of homicides in Michigan
- Lists of killings by law enforcement officers in the United States
