= Sax Man =

Maurice Reedus Jr.
- Also known as: Sax Man
- Born: January 19, 1953
- Died: April 16, 2018 (aged 65); Cleveland, Ohio, U.S.
- Occupation: Street performer
- Instrument: Saxophone
- Formerly of: Sly, Slick and Wicked

Maurice Reedus Jr. (January 19, 1953 – April 16, 2018), better known as the Sax Man, was an American saxophone player and street performer based in Cleveland, Ohio. For more than 17 years, Reedus played an alto saxophone outside Playhouse Square and Cleveland sporting events. A documentary about his life and career, The Sax Man, directed by Joe Siebert, premiered at the 2014 Cleveland International Film Festival.

Reedus was the oldest of six children born to Maurice Reedus Sr. and his wife. His father played saxophone for Robert Lockwood Jr. for thirty-five years, and Reedus Jr. grew up desiring to follow suit.

In 2013, Reedus received two tickets from police for playing without a license or a permit, which prompted City Councilman Joe Cimperman to push for legislation in favor of Reedus. In July 2013, the Cleveland City Council passed the Street Performers Ordinance, also known as the Sax Man Legislation, which explicitly allows "acting, singing, playing musical instruments, pantomime, juggling, magic, dancing, reciting and clowning" on Cleveland streets for money. Days later, Reedus played a reunion concert with the group, Sly, Slick and Wicked (Cleveland group) where in the past he always played sax in the group's backup band when the group toured in the 70's.Sly, Slick and Wicked, at the Cleveland House of Blues, where Cimperman presented him with the legislation.

Philip Morris of The Plain Dealer, Cleveland's daily newspaper, described Reedus as "the best known street musician to ever call this city home." Joe Siebert called him "a fixture in the city", noting his many years of playing on the streets and the fame he has garnered among Cleveland locals.

Reedus died on April 16, 2018, at the age of 65.
