= Sly, Slick and Wicked =

American band

- Origin: Cleveland, Ohio
- Genres: R&B
- Years active: 1970–2026
- Labels: People, Shaker, Ju-Par (Motown), Epic
- Past members: John Wilson; Charles Still (deceased); Mark Saxton; Terry Stubbs; Maurice Reedus Jr.

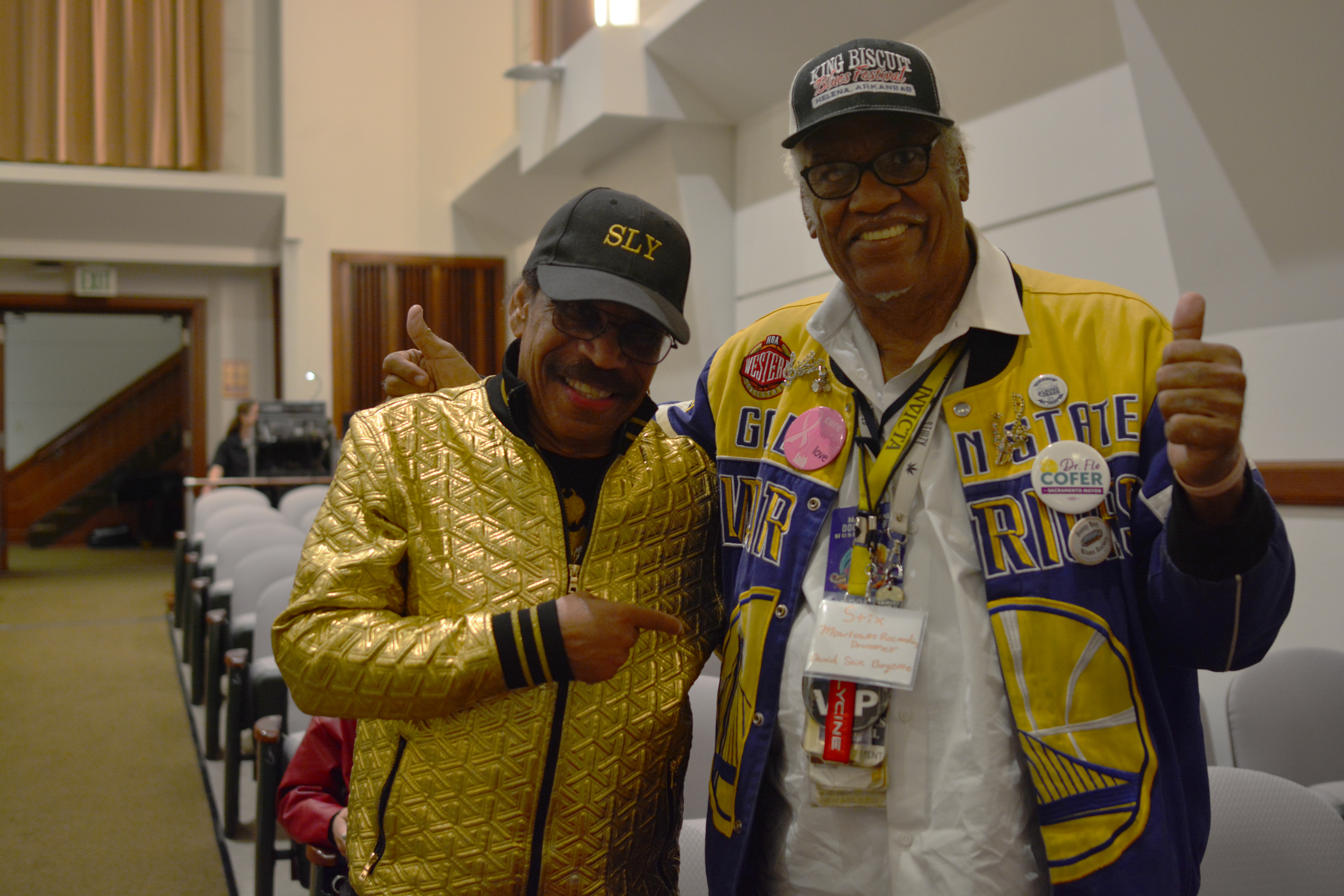
John "Sly" Wilson (left) with Jack "Stix" Ashford of the Funk Brothers, 2025.

Sly, Slick & Wicked is an American rhythm and blues band from Cleveland, Ohio. The group was formed in 1970 by John (Sly) Wilson, Charles (Slick) Still, and Mark (Wicked) Saxton. Two years after their formation, Terry Stubbs replaced Saxton and Maurice Reedus Jr. became part of their backup musicians. Their song "Stay My Love" was a Top Ten rhythm-and-blues song in 1971, and Polydor issued a 1972 follow-up, "It's Not Easy."

On the strength of these recordings, James Brown asked them to work for People Records, a sublabel of Polydor run by Brown. This made the band a part of what was called James Brown's "First Family of Soul." In 1973, John Wilson wrote the song "Sho' Nuff", which the band recorded with People Records that same year. The success of this record led Don Cornelius to sign the band to appear on Soul Train.

Later, the band became part of the O'Jays' Shaker Records, creating the song "Turn On Your Lovelight" in 1974. Around 1976, the band signed with Motown. The band's debut album Sly, Slick & Wicked was released by Ju-Par in 1977.

They were awarded the Men of Motown Award from the Motown Museum in 2003, and were inducted into the Motown Alumni Association Hall of Fame. In 2003, the Rock and Roll Hall of Fame added the group to its permanent display. They were inducted into the Rhythm and Blues Music Hall of Fame in 2013. The group is featured in the 2014 documentary, The Sax Man, which focused on Maurice Reedus Jr.'s musical career.

"Suit and Tie" by Justin Timberlake and "Chaining Day" by J.Cole contain samples from their song "Sho Nuff".

On October 2, 2025, Charles (Slick) Still passed away. He was cremated and his ashes were given to his wife and son Charles Still (who was named after him).

== Discography ==
- "Stay My Love" / "Surely" (1972) – Paramount
- "It's Not Easy" / "Your Love Was Meant For Me" (1973) – Paramount
- "Sho Nuff" / "Ready For You" (1973) – People Records
- "Turn On Your Lovelight" / "We Don't Have To Be Lovers" (1974) – Shaker Records
- Sly, Slick & Wicked (1977) – Ju-Par
- "All I Want Is Your" / "The Prophet" (1978) – Epic
