= Truly Yours (EP) =

EP by J. Cole
- Released: February 12, 2013
- Recorded: 2009; 2012–2013
- Genre: Hip hop
- Length: 16:41
- Label: Dreamville
- Producer: J. Cole; No I.D.; Lauryn Hill; Che Pope

J. Cole chronology
Cole World: The Sideline Story (2011)	Truly Yours (2013)	Truly Yours 2 (2013)

Truly Yours is the first extended play by American hip hop artist J. Cole. They were released digitally for free download and stream on February 12, 2013. The EP contains production from J. Cole, No I.D., Lauryn Hill and Che Pope. The EP has been downloaded over 500,000 times on mixtape site DatPiff.

== Background ==
The series consists of songs that Cole knew would not make the cutlist for his second studio album Born Sinner. The free EP was released as a trilogy, with the third being released as the deluxe edition of Born Sinner.

== Critical reception ==
Writing for HotNewHipHop, Iva Anthony wrote a mostly positive review for Truly Yours, she said it "achieves exactly what J. Cole set out to do: whet the appetites of his fans and as he preps to feed the masses with Born Sinner, while simultaneously reminding everyone of his position within the rap game."

== Track listing ==
Truly Yours
No.	Title	Writer(s)	Producer(s)	Length
1.	"Can I Holla At Ya"	Jermaine Cole	Lauryn Hill; Che Pope	4:22
2.	"Crunch Time"	Cole	J. Cole	3:34
3.	"Rise Above"	Cole	Cole	2:29
4.	"Tears for ODB"	Cole	Cole	3:53
5.	"Stay (2009)"	Cole	No I.D.	3:03
Total length:				17:21

Notes

- "Stay" was recorded in 2009. Cole revealed in an interview with MTV that the song was intended for his debut album, Cole World: The Sideline Story, but he never bought the beat from No I.D. Rapper Nas eventually used the beat on his 2012 release Life Is Good in a song titled by the same name.

Sample credits

- "Can I Holla At Ya" interpolates and contains samples of "To Zion" by Lauryn Hill.
- "Crunch Time" contains samples of "Munchies for Your Love" by Bootsy Collins.
