= Miss America (J. Cole song) =

Single by J. Cole

from the album Born Sinner
- Released: November 13, 2012
- Recorded: 2012
- Genre: Hip hop
- Length: 3:44
- Label: Roc Nation; Columbia; Dreamville
- Songwriters: Jermaine Lamar Cole, Brookln Dekker
- Producer: J. Cole

"Miss America" is a song by American hip hop recording artist J. Cole, released November 13, 2012 as the first promotional single from his second studio album Born Sinner (2013). The song, which was produced by Cole himself, samples Rue Royale's "Flightline". The song debuted at #34 on the Hot R&B/Hip-Hop Songs. The song was used in Ubisoft's Launch trailer for the 2013 video game Splinter Cell: Blacklist.

== Background ==
On November 5, 2012, J. Cole announced that his second studio album would be titled Born Sinner and would release on January 28, 2013, along with a teaser video for it. Prior to the November 13, 2012 release of "Miss America" Cole also released a teaser video for the single. The single cover was released on November 12, 2012. Cole said he pushed away pop-accessibility in order to put out a single that provides social commentary. The song has been described by multiple outlets and Cole himself as not an ordinary first single and in no way directed towards radio. Later Cole leaked another version of the song called "Miss America Reprise" which features the same lyrics but different production compared to the single version.

== Themes ==
The song Miss America discusses the corruption of an artist when he has the chance for commercial appeal and corruption of government when capitalism is involved. When speaking about the single with Billboard Cole said,

"I’m gonna try to use it to shift culture just a little bit. To me, 'Miss America' shifts things a little bit, it changes the conversation it takes it in a more aggressive direction, more raw, more social commentary... Any type of commentary is good compared to what a normal single is these days. That’s my aim, is to shift culture slightly, change the conversation. Nobody expects that for your first single."

== Chart performance ==
The song first charted on the week of December 1, 2012, on the Hot R&B/Hip-Hop Songs chart at No. 34.

== Charts ==
Chart (2012)	Peak position
US Bubbling Under Hot 100 (Billboard)	20
US Hot R&B/Hip-Hop Songs (Billboard)	34

== Release history ==
Region	Date	Format	Label
United States	November 13, 2012	digital download	Roc Nation, Columbia Records
