= Born Sinner =

Studio album by J. Cole
- Released: June 18, 2013
- Recorded: 2011–2013
- Studios: KMA; Premier; Stadium Red (New York City); Record One; Record Plant (Los Angeles)
- Genre: Hip hop
- Length: 59:28
- Labels: ByStorm; Columbia; Dreamville; Roc Nation
- Producers: Christian Rich; J. Cole; Jake One; Syience

J. Cole chronology
Truly Yours 2 (2013)	Born Sinner (2013)	2014 Forest Hills Drive (2014)

Deluxe edition cover

Singles from Born Sinner
- 1. "Power Trip" Released: February 14, 2013; 2. "Crooked Smile" Released: June 4, 2013; 3. "Forbidden Fruit" Released: August 1, 2013; 4. "She Knows" Released: October 29, 2013

Born Sinner is the second studio album by American rapper J. Cole. It was released on June 18, 2013, by ByStorm Entertainment, Columbia Records, Dreamville Records and Roc Nation. The album serves as the follow-up to his debut album, Cole World: The Sideline Story (2011). The album features guest appearances from Miguel, Amber Coffman, Jhené Aiko, James Fauntleroy, Bas, TLC, Kendrick Lamar and 50 Cent. The album was also primarily produced by Cole himself, along with others such as Jake One, Syience, and Elite.

Born Sinner was supported by four official singles; "Power Trip", "Crooked Smile", "Forbidden Fruit" and "She Knows", along with the promotional single "Miss America". The album received generally positive reviews from critics. It debuted at number two on the US Billboard 200, selling 297,000 copies in its first week of release. After two weeks of being at number two, Born Sinner climbed to number one in its third week. The album has since been certified double platinum by the Recording Industry Association of America (RIAA). As of December 2016, the album has sold 796,000 copies in the United States.

== Background ==
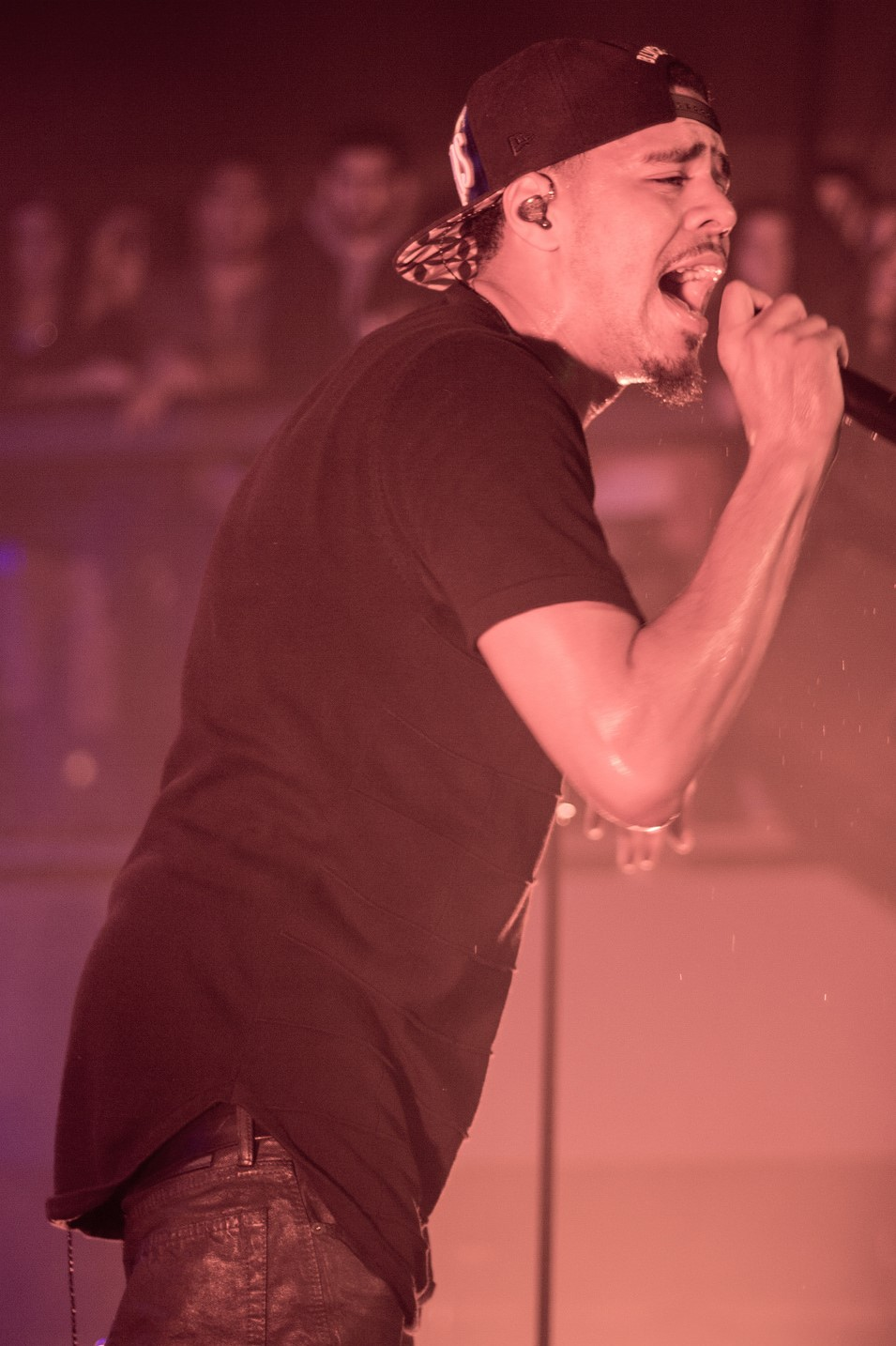
J. Cole provided the vast majority of songwriting and production for the album.

Only a week after the release of his gold certified-debut album Cole World: The Sideline Story, Cole began working on his second album, Born Sinner. He said that it allowed him to, "reinvigorate himself both mentally and creatively." On October 24, 2011, during his interview with Hot 106's Rise & Grind morning show, Cole revealed that he had begun working on his second studio album, with hopes of releasing it in June 2012. He had also stated that the album would consist of songs that failed to make his debut: "I don't know how many, but I got songs that didn't make the last album that are automatically going to make this one." On February 24, 2012, J. Cole reached two million followers on Twitter, he celebrated by releasing the song "Grew up Fast." On March 1, 2012, J. Cole returned to his hometown of Fayetteville, North Carolina. To celebrate his return, he released the song "Visionz of Home" (which launched an event, titled "Dreamville weekend") to inspire the youth of his hometown to achieve great things. On July 26, he returned to Twitter after a 100-day absence and went on to reveal and release his new song "The Cure" in where he hints at a new album. On October 20, he announced at a live show that his second album was complete and he would wait until after Kendrick Lamar released Good Kid, M.A.A.D City to reveal it and previewed two new songs, "Maine on Fire" and "Crooked Smile." However they were not tied to any project. "Maine on Fire" would end up appearing on a Funkmaster Flex mixtape.

On November 5, Cole revealed the title of his second album, and an album teaser for it, Born Sinner and the release date of January 28, 2013, via Ustream. With the title he ended his basketball-themed series of projects. He would say,

It was just time for something new. I wouldn't have minded doing it again but I felt that I closed that story. "That metaphor and that storyline had really ended. Metaphorically I was just a kid working to get on this basketball team, got cut – that was The Come Up, then The Warm Up was like, alright I made the team, I'm on the team, now what? I'm not in the game, I'll just ride the end of the bench. Then Friday Night Lights was like 'come on man, you're still not gonna put me in the game? What I gotta do? Here, I'm gonna kill it in practice. Sideline Story was like, Wow, I really am starting now, and I feel like I ended that chapter when it's all said and done. Plus, this new theme is really more reflective of where I'm at and where I've been at for the past two years, so it was just perfect to move on.

== Recording and production ==
On November 30, 2012, Cole said he feels the album will be better than his debut due to him being more free in creating this one. Most of the production will come from himself and most guest producers and features will be kept under wraps until the album release comes closer. He went onto say the features will be minor and key to the album. The album's production was primarily handled by J. Cole himself. Also in November 2012, Cole stated that the album is 90% completed including the writing and recording. Cole said he recorded four albums worth of material during the recording process for the album.

== Promotion ==
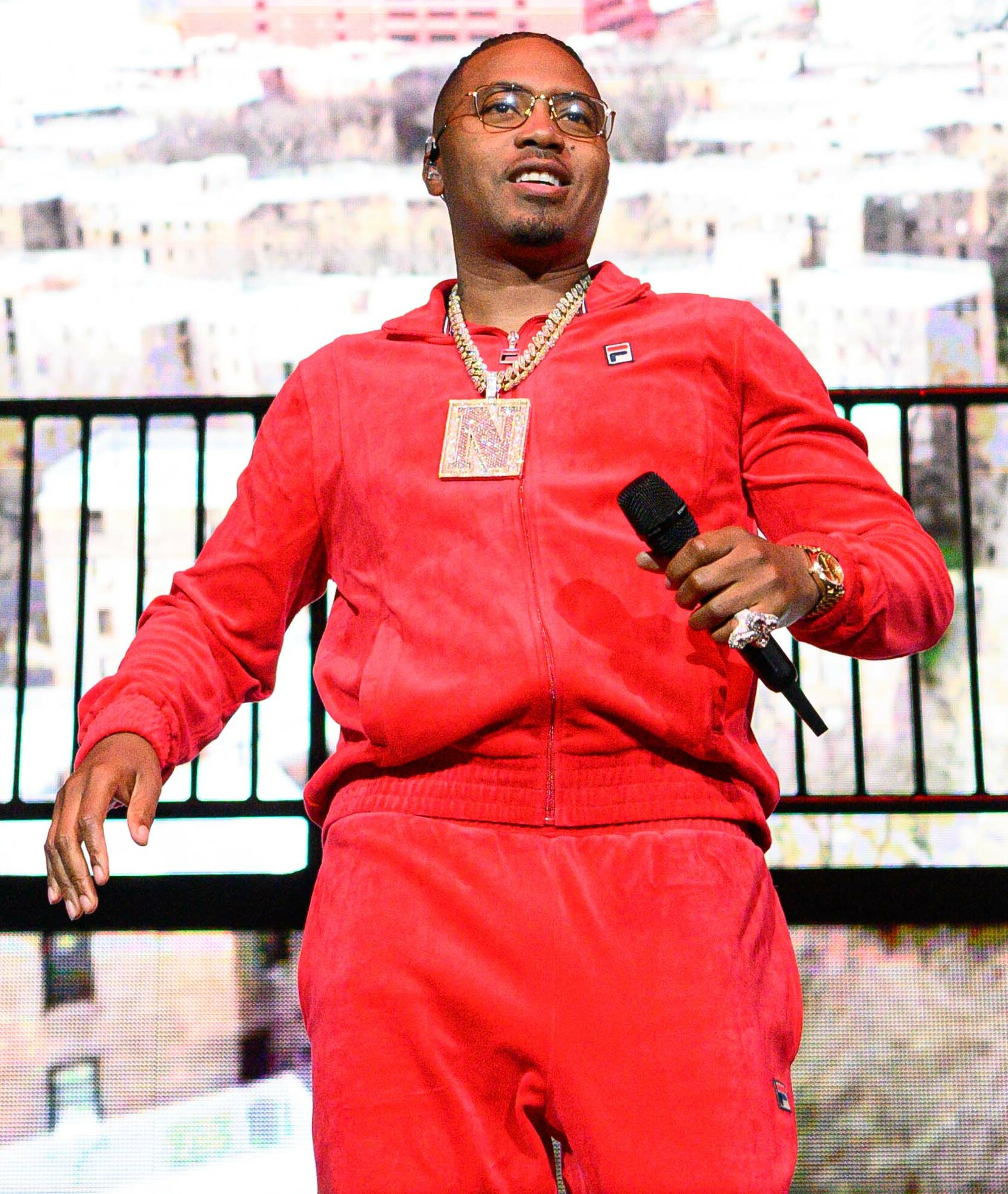
Rapper Nas was the inspiration behind the track "Let Nas Down", Nas also remixed the track.

J. Cole announced a release date of January 28, 2013, (his birthday) along with the album name on November 9, 2012. In early January the album was included on multiple "Most Anticipated Albums of 2013" such as MTV and XXL ranked Born Sinner the sixth most anticipated album of 2013. After describing the January release date as ambitious, he would announce on New Years Day 2013 that the album would be coming out at a later date. On February 22, 2013, J. Cole said that the album should arrive around June 2013. He later would confirm a release month for June, and then on April 8, 2013, J. Cole announced via Twitter that the album would be released on June 25, 2013. Interesting enough, that date would have been the seventeenth anniversary of the release of Jay-Z's debut album Reasonable Doubt. However, he announced on May 20, 2013, via his Twitter account that he would move the release up one week to June 18, 2013. He later revealed that he moved up the release date to coincide with the release of Kanye West's album Yeezus, saying "Instantly the lightbulb [turned on]… it got real. I was like, 'Yo…' The idea hit me instantly: 'You got to go to that date. I'm not going to sit [here]… I worked too hard to come a week later after Kanye West drops an amazing album. It'd be like, 'Oh and J. Cole dropped too, a week later.' Nah. I'm going to go see him on that date. He's the greatest. So it's like, I'm a competitor by nature so it was instant, it wasn't even a thought."

On February 12, 2013, Cole released a free EP titled Truly Yours in promotion of the album. The EP consists of five songs in their "raw form" that he knew would not make the cutlist for Born Sinner. Later on April 29, he announced that he would be releasing Truly Yours 2 the following day. The EP featured guest appearances by 2 Chainz, Young Jeezy and Bas, with production from Canei Finch, Jake One and J. Cole himself. Cole announced the deluxe version of the album will include an extra CD which will double as Truly Yours 3 and featuring 5 new songs. The track features 50 Cent and Bas, which Cole originally wanted to have 50 and Nas on the song.

J. Cole said there is a lot he wants to do that he didn't get to do on his last album because the label didn't know that he was going to come out and have the number-one album in the country so this time he hopes the promotion effort is way bigger. He plans to shoot a short film to accompany the album as well as multiple music videos. In promotion of the album Cole released several Born Sinner vlogs, the first video spotlighted Cole's mother and her former job of working at the post office, and her retirement. The second video spotlighted friend and frequent collaborator Kendrick Lamar. In the video he discusses his earliest musical influences and his work ethic. On June 6, 2013, J. Cole held one time listen sessions for the album in various places throughout North America. The following day the album leaked in full online via various peer-to-peer file sharing websites. Rather than go into crisis mode and attempt to remove it from online, Cole put the album up for a limited time free stream. Cole and Nas released "Let Nas Down (Remix)" on June 22, 2013. The remix was named one of the best songs of the first half of 2013 by Complex. On July 29, 2013, Cole announced What Dreams May Come Tour with fellow rapper Wale.

=== Singles ===
The first promotional single from Born Sinner was "Miss America" and which released on November 13, 2012. Cole said he pushed away pop-accessibility in order to put out a single that provides social commentary. The song has been described by multiple outlets and Cole himself as not an ordinary first single and in no way directed towards radio. The song was used in Ubisoft's Launch trailer for the 2013 video game Tom Clancy's Splinter Cell: Blacklist. The song peaked at number 34 on the US Hot R&B/Hip-Hop Songs.

On February 12, 2013, J. Cole announced that the first official single from the album would be released in the next week. Two days later on February 14, he released the lead single, "Power Trip", a collaboration with Miguel. On April 9, 2013, the music video for the song was released. The song peaked at number 19 on the US Billboard Hot 100 and was certified platinum by the Recording Industry Association of America (RIAA).

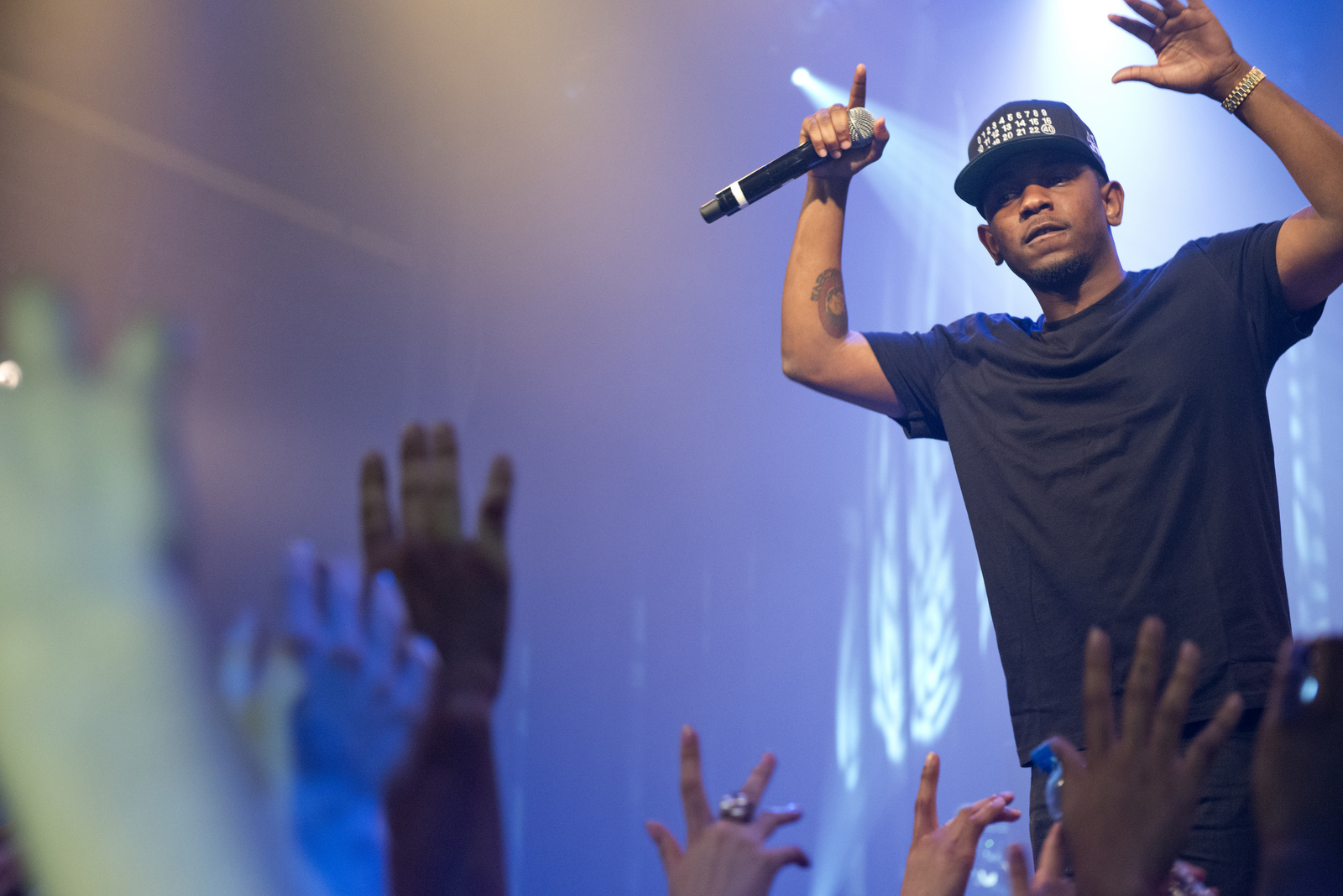
Rapper Kendrick Lamar made an appearance on the album's third single "Forbidden Fruit".

The second official single, "Crooked Smile" featuring R&B group TLC premiered on June 3, 2013. The song was made available on iTunes the following day. The music video for the song was released on September 18, 2013. It peaked at number 27 on the US Billboard Hot 100 and was certified platinum by the Recording Industry Association of America (RIAA).

"Forbidden Fruit" featuring rapper Kendrick Lamar was the last song recorded for the album, as it contained a reference to him dropping his album the same day as Kanye West, who also released Yeezus on June 18, 2013. It was reported by MTV in June 2013, that it would be the album's third single. Then on August 1, 2013, it was sent to urban contemporary radio as Born Sinner's third single. The song peaked at number 46 on the US Hot R&B/Hip-Hop Songs.

On October 29, 2013, "She Knows" featuring Amber Coffman, was serviced to urban contemporary radio as the album's fourth official single. It officially impacted rhythmic contemporary radio on November 19, 2013. The music video for the song was released on February 14, 2014. The song peaked at number 90 on the US Billboard Hot 100.

== Critical reception ==
Professional ratings
Aggregate scores
Source	Rating
AnyDecentMusic?	6.6/10
Metacritic	71/100
Review scores
Source	Rating
AllMusic	4/5 stars
Entertainment Weekly	B−
Financial Times	4/5 stars
Los Angeles Times	2.5/4 stars
MSN Music (Expert Witness)	B+
Pitchfork	6.0/10
Rolling Stone	3.5/5 stars
Slant Magazine	4/5 stars
Spin	6/10
XXL	3/5

Born Sinner was met with generally positive reviews. At Metacritic, which assigns a normalized rating out of 100 to reviews from mainstream publications, the album received an average score of 71, based on 21 reviews. Aggregator AnyDecentMusic? gave it 6.6 out of 10, based on their assessment of the critical consensus.

Kyle Anderson of Entertainment Weekly said, "He's a talented, nimble rapper, but diatribes like "Trouble" and "Land of the Snakes" are more exhausting than impressive... The jazz-kissed "Let Nas Down", a deeply personal tale about hearing that one of his rap idols hated his early single "Work Out", delivers far greater impact without all the high-minded posturing about love and death." Erin Lowers of Exclaim! said, "With the exception of two numbers, the self-produced 16-track project revels in Timbaland drumlines ("Born Sinner") and soulful Kanye symphonies ("Chaining Day"). However, the standout cut samples A Tribe Called Quest's "Electric Relaxation", featuring the only other rapper on the album: Kendrick Lamar. "Forbidden Fruit" embodies a silent confidence, paying homage to a legendary group while speaking on releasing an album the same day as Kanye West, bringing Born Sinner full-circle." Julia LeConte of Now said, "Born Sinner's production, Cole's own, is nuanced and varied on the whole – looped harp, careful piano, electronic elements, boom bap drums, choirs everywhere – but all impeccably orchestrated." August Brown of the Los Angeles Times said, "If the self-mythologizing of Yeezus is a little much for you, how about a rap album where the MC is bummed that he disappointed his hero? J. Cole's Born Sinner is at the other end of the universe from Kanye West's latest – a quieter, self-examining rap record that's short on audacity but long on workman-like singles."

Ben Simms of XXL said, "Born Sinner's best moments are when he embraces the persona that initially garnered him praise. "Power Trip", "Crooked Smile" and "Let Nas Down" are the album's strongest tracks, and they feel like the rapper who created The Warm Up, which only becomes problematic at times because of Cole's insistence to produce almost all of his work. But while BS may not exhibit the growth sonically or conceptually that fans may have anticipated after hearing Cole's early work, he remains too gifted lyrically, too keen of a storyteller, and too emotionally open for his sophomore LP to be anything less than impressive, but not overly so." Corban Goble of Pitchfork said, "At its best, Born Sinner, showcases J. Cole's overall musicality, pairing his ability as a lyricist with a more broadly developed production palette. In a heat, he can rattle off some fierce rejoinders (See: "Niggaz Know"). But several releases deep into Cole's growing catalogue, we haven't been delivered the savior that Jay-Z's "A Star Is Born" seemed to anoint. (The latter's current indifference to Cole has become so pronounced that Cole has to keep squashing beef rumors.)" David Jeffries of AllMusic said, "It's snide, smart-ass stuff and when it comes to sublime / ridiculous balancing act that his heroes Jay-Z and Nas have mastered, Cole is a little short on the sublime side here to be considered classic. Still, "Crooked Smile" with special guests TLC is a genuine, mature step in the right direction and will have no trouble reaching vintage age. A handful of other numbers carry that same weight, making Born Sinner a daring step forward for Cole and an exciting attempt at mastering Jay's Blueprint style."

Ted Scheinman of Slant Magazine said, "Here's the only real problem with Born Sinner: Cole's production work is elegant, but he's first and foremost a words guy, and when you're competing with the lushness of Kendrick Lamar (who makes a spooky appearance on "Forbidden Fruit") or the preening, infectious weirdness of Kanye, playing it straight is probably not sexy enough. Born Sinner doesn't match the cohesive satisfactions of Good Kid, M.A.A.D City, though it boasts better writing." Francesca D'Arcy-Orga of PopMatters said, "For many, lyrically, he's better on a higher percentage of Born Sinner than Kendrick was on Good Kid, M.A.A.D City, but the album lacks the superb production and cohesiveness that makes GKMC standout. Still, no one can say that J. Cole has failed to deliver on this album. He's certainly impressed with his flow, delivery and production, and while he hasn't released the next golden hip hop album he's coming close." Jon Dolan of Rolling Stone said, "Sometimes I brag like Hov / Sometimes I'm real like Pac," J. Cole raps on his second LP. Sometimes he's both – a verbal powerhouse and a self-emptying truth-sayer. The flagship signee to Jay-Z's record label spins dervish rhymes over dazzling self-produced tracks (see the Outkast-sampling "Land of the Snakes"). His riffs on racism, homophobia and misogyny have more lyrical cunning than insight." Have fun at the next company picnic, homey."

=== Rankings ===
Select rankings of Born Sinner
Publication	List	Rank	Ref.
Associated Press	Top 10 Albums of the Year	4	
Complex	50 Best Albums of 2013	13	
PopMatters	The Best Hip-Hop of 2013	7	
Rolling Stone	20 Best Hip-Hop Albums of 2013	7	
Slant Magazine	The 25 Best Albums of 2013	14	
The Source	The 25 Best Albums of 2013	11	

=== Industry awards ===
Awards and nominations for Born Sinner
Year	Ceremony	Category	Result	Ref.
2013	BET Hip Hop Awards	Album of the Year	Nominated	
2014	Billboard Music Awards	Top Rap Album	Nominated	

== Commercial performance ==
Born Sinner sold 297,000 copies in the United States in its first week of release, debuting at number two on the Billboard 200, finishing approximately 30,000 copies short of Kanye West's Yeezus. In its second week, the album remained at number two on the chart, selling an additional 84,000 copies. After two weeks of being at number two, Born Sinner climbed to number one in its third week with 58,000 more copies sold. In its fourth week, the album dropped to number three, selling 39,000 copies. As of December 2016, the album has sold 796,000 copies domestically according to Nielsen SoundScan. On September 15, 2020, Born Sinner was certified double platinum by the Recording Industry Association of America (RIAA).

In 2013, Born Sinner was ranked as the thirty-fourth most popular album of the year on the Billboard 200.

== Track listing ==
Born Sinner track listing
No.	Title	Writer(s)	Producer(s)	Length
1.	"Villuminati"	Jermaine Cole; Christopher Wallace; Sean Combs; Jean-Claude Olivier; James Mtume; Robert Kelly; Sylvester Stewart; Todd Thomas	J. Cole	5:07
2.	"Kerney Sermon (Skit)"			0:46
3.	"Land of the Snakes"	Cole; André Benjamin; Antwan Patton; David Sheats; Ronald Gilmore	Cole	4:14
4.	"Power Trip" (featuring Miguel)	Cole; Hubert Laws	Cole	4:01
5.	"Mo Money (Interlude)"	Cole; Jacob Dutton	Jake One	1:17
6.	"Trouble"	Cole; Brandon Green	Cole	4:18
7.	"Runaway"	Cole; Anthony Parrino	Cole; Elite^{[b]}	5:14
8.	"She Knows" (featuring Amber Coffman and Cults)	Cole; Ryan Mattos; Madeline McKenna	Cole	4:56
9.	"Rich Niggaz"	Cole; Michael Giffts; Deborah Anderson; Fabrice Dumont; Stéphan Haeri; Christophe Hétier; Gilmore; Cedric Brown	Cole	4:36
10.	"Where's Jermaine? (Skit)"	Cole	Cole	0:36
11.	"Forbidden Fruit" (featuring Kendrick Lamar)	Cole; Ronnie Foster	Cole	4:28
12.	"Chaining Day"	Cole; Terry Stubbs; John Wilson; Charles Still	Cole	4:44
13.	"Ain't That Some Shit (Interlude)"	Cole; Reggie Perry	Syience	2:27
14.	"Crooked Smile" (featuring TLC)	Cole; Parrino; Rich Harrison; Meleni Smith	Cole; Elite^{[a]}	4:38
15.	"Let Nas Down"	Cole; Parrino; Fela Kuti	Cole	4:37
16.	"Born Sinner" (featuring James Fauntleroy)	Cole; Parrino; Juro Davis; Canei Finch; Abbas Hamad; James Fauntleroy II	Cole; Elite^{[a]}	3:29
Total length:				59:28

Deluxe edition (bonus tracks): Truly Yours 3
No.	Title	Writer(s)	Producer(s)	Length
17.	"Miss America"	Cole; Brookln Dekker	Cole	3:45
18.	"New York Times" (featuring 50 Cent and Bas)	Cole; Curtis Jackson; Hamad	Cole	4:31
19.	"Is She Gon Pop"	Cole; Davis; Hamad; Wayne Bell	Cole	2:45
20.	"Niggaz Know"	Cole; Willie Chambers; Andre Goodwin; Steven Jordan; Combs; Wallace; Steven Howse; Byron McCane; Anthony Henderson	Cole	3:37
21.	"Sparks Will Fly" (featuring Jhené Aiko)	Cole; Taiwo Hassan; Kehinde Hassan; David Bollmann; Kelly Bollmann; Stacie Bollmann; Matthew Osborn; Stephen Patrick	Christian Rich	4:12
Total length:				78:18

Notes

- ^{^[a]} signifies a co-producer
- ^{^[b]} signifies an additional producer
- "Villuminati" contains additional background vocals by Tanikka Myers and Yolanda DeBerry
- "Land of the Snakes" contains background vocals by Amber Coffman
- "Crooked Smile" contains additional vocals by Meleni Smith

Sample credits

- "Villuminati" contains samples of "Juicy", written by Christopher Wallace, Sean Combs, Jean-Claude Olivier and James Mtume, as performed by The Notorious B.I.G.; "I Wish – Remix (To the Homies We Lost)", written and performed by R. Kelly; and "People Everyday", written by Sylvester Stewart and Todd Thomas, as performed by Arrested Development.
- "Land of the Snakes" contains a sample of "Da Art of Storytellin' (Pt. 1)", written by André Benjamin, Antwan Patton and David Sheats, as performed by Outkast.
- "Power Trip" contains a sample of "No More", written and performed by Hubert Laws.
- "She Knows" contains a sample of "Bad Things", written by Ryan Mattos and Madeline McKenna, as performed by Cults.
- "Rich Niggaz" contains a sample of "Into Everything", written by Deborah Anderson, Michael Giffts, Fabrice Dumont, Stéphan Haeri and Christophe Hétier, as performed by Télépopmusik.
- "Forbidden Fruit" contains a sample of "Mystic Brew", written and performed by Ronnie Foster.
- "Chaining Day" contains a sample of "Sho' Nuff", written by Terry Stubbs, John Wilson and Charles Still, as performed by Sly, Slick and Wicked.
- "Crooked Smile" contains an uncredited sample of "No One Gonna Love You", as performed by Jennifer Hudson.
- "Let Nas Down" contains a sample of "Gentleman", written and performed by Fela Kuti.
- "Miss America" contains a sample of "Flightline", written by Brookln Dekker, as performed by Rue Royale.
- "Is She Gon Pop" contains a sample of "Chocolate Girl", written by Wayne Bell, as performed by The Whispers.
- "Niggaz Know" contains samples of "So Tired", written by Willie Chambers and Andre Goodwin, as performed by The Chambers Brothers; and "Notorious Thugs", written by Steven Jordan, Sean Combs, Christopher Wallace, Steven Howse, Byron McCane and Anthony Henderson, as performed by The Notorious B.I.G. featuring Bone Thugs-n-Harmony.

== Personnel ==
Credits for Born Sinner adapted from AllMusic.

- James Fauntleroy II – featured artist
- Juro "Mez" Davis – engineer, mixing
- Jessica Antonetty – choir/chorus
- Kyle Armbrust – viola
- Ronnie Artis – choir/chorus
- Jamal Kris Ashby – choir/chorus
- Chris Athens – mastering
- Jay Bratten – bass
- Cedric Brown – sampling
- Canei Finch – keyboards
- Al Carty – bass
- Christine Kim – cello
- Amber Coffman – featured artist, vocals (background)
- Jermaine Cole – executive producer
- Stephanie De Los Santos – choir/chorus
- Yolanda DeBerry – vocals (background)
- DJ Dummy – scratching
- Sean Drew – choir/chorus
- Nabil Elderkin – photography
- Elite – producer
- Desiree Elsevier – viola
- Chris Feldmann – art direction
- Ari Feliciano – choir/chorus
- Alvin Fields – choir director
- Sam Giannelli – assistant engineer
- Ron Gilmore – keyboards, string arrangements
- Jerry Grossman – cello
- Michael Harris – choir/chorus
- Rose Hart – choir/chorus
- Tyler Hartman – string engineer
- Serena Hernandez – choir/chorus
- Mario Hugo – art direction, design, illustrations
- J. Cole – engineer, primary artist, producer
- Erika Johnson – choir/chorus
- Nate Jones – bass
- Shmuel Katz – viola
- Brent Kolatalo – engineer
- Kendrick Lamar – featured artist
- Ann Lehmann – violin
- Ken Lewis – choir arrangement, choir production, producer, string contractor, string engineer
- David Linaburg – guitar
- Alyse Maree – choir/chorus
- Roman Marshall – choir/chorus
- Joanna Maurer – concert master, violin
- Maureen McDermott – cello
- Miguel – featured artist
- John Morgan – choir/chorus
- Tanika Myers – vocals (background)
- Tavon Nelson – choir/chorus
- K Nita – choir/chorus
- Suzanne Ornstein – violin
- Sandra Park – string contractor
- Jessenia Peña – choir/chorus
- Mark Pitts – executive producer
- Annaliesa Place – violin
- Isaiah Raheem – choir/chorus
- Felix Ramos – choir/chorus
- Daniel Recinos – assistant engineer
- Adam Rodney – creative director
- Tiffany Rodriguez – choir/chorus
- Carmen Roman – choir contractor
- Courtnee Rose – percussion
- Natalis Ruby Rubero – choir/chorus
- Hanan Rubinstein – engineer, vocal engineer
- Timothy Saccenti – photography
- Fred Sladkey – engineer
- Gerald Smith – choir/chorus
- Meleni Smith – vocals
- David Southhorn – violin
- Milena Pajro-Van De Stadt – viola
- Brett Sturgis – choir/chorus
- TLC – featured artist
- Marcos Tovar – engineer
- Pete Whitfield – orchestration
- Mary Wooten – cello
- William World – choir/chorus
- Jung Sun Yoo – violin

== Charts ==
=== Weekly charts ===
Chart performance for Born Sinner
Chart (2013)	Peak position
Australian Albums (ARIA)	14
Canadian Albums (Billboard)	2
Danish Albums (Hitlisten)	24
Dutch Albums (Album Top 100)	65
New Zealand Albums (RMNZ)	11
Swiss Albums (Schweizer Hitparade)	27
UK Albums (Official Charts)	7
US Billboard 200	1
US Top R&B/Hip-Hop Albums (Billboard)	1

=== Year-end charts ===
2013 year-end chart performance for Born Sinner
Chart (2013)	Position
US Billboard 200	34
US Top R&B/Hip-Hop Albums (Billboard)	9

2014 year-end chart performance for Born Sinner
Chart (2014)	Position
US Top R&B/Hip-Hop Albums (Billboard)	53

2016 year-end chart performance for Born Sinner
Chart (2016)	Position
US Billboard 200	153

=== Decade-end charts ===
Decade-end chart performance for Born Sinner
Chart (2010–2019)	Position
US Billboard 200	199

== Certifications ==
Certifications for Born Sinner
Region	Certification	Certified units/sales
Canada (Music Canada)	Gold	40,000^{^}
Denmark (IFPI Danmark)	Gold	10,000^{‡}
United Kingdom (BPI)	Gold	100,000^{‡}
United States (RIAA)	3× Platinum	796,000
^{^} Shipments figures based on certification alone.^{‡} Sales+streaming figures based on certification alone.

== Release history ==
Release dates and formats for Born Sinner
Region	Date	Label(s)	Format(s)	Edition	Ref.
Australia	June 14, 2013	Columbia; Roc Nation; Sony	CD; digital download	Standard; deluxe	
Canada	June 14, 2013	Columbia; Roc Nation; Sony	CD; digital download	Standard; deluxe	
Germany	June 17, 2013	Columbia; Roc Nation; Sony	CD; digital download	Standard; deluxe	
Ireland	June 17, 2013	Columbia; Roc Nation; Sony	CD; digital download	Standard; deluxe	
United Kingdom	June 17, 2013	Columbia; Roc Nation; Sony	CD; digital download	Standard; deluxe	
United States	June 18, 2013	Columbia; Roc Nation; Sony	CD; digital download	Standard; deluxe	
New Zealand	June 23, 2013	Columbia; Roc Nation; Sony	CD; digital download	Standard; deluxe	
Japan	June 29, 2013	Columbia; Roc Nation; Sony	CD; digital download	Standard	
