= Forbidden Fruit (J. Cole song) =

Single by J. Cole featuring Kendrick Lamar

from the album Born Sinner
- Released: August 1, 2013
- Recorded: 2013; Premier Studios (New York City)
- Genre: Hip hop
- Length: 4:29
- Label: Roc Nation; Columbia; Dreamville
- Songwriters: Jermaine Cole; Ronnie Foster
- Producer: J. Cole

J. Cole singles chronology
"Crooked Smile" (2013)	"Forbidden Fruit" (2013)	"She Knows" (2013)

Kendrick Lamar singles chronology
"Give It 2 U" (2013)	"Forbidden Fruit" (2013)	"Radioactive" (2014)

"Forbidden Fruit" is a song by American hip hop recording artist J. Cole. The song was sent to radio stations in August 2013, as the third official single from Cole's second studio album, Born Sinner (2013). "Forbidden Fruit" was produced by Cole himself and features a guest appearance from fellow rapper Kendrick Lamar, who contributes vocals to the song's hook. The song features a sample of American jazz musician Ronnie Foster's "Mystic Brew", most recognized from its use on hip hop group A Tribe Called Quest's "Electric Relaxation". The song was met with mixed reviews from music critics. "Forbidden Fruit" would peak at number 46 on the Billboard Hot R&B/Hip-Hop Songs chart.

== Background ==
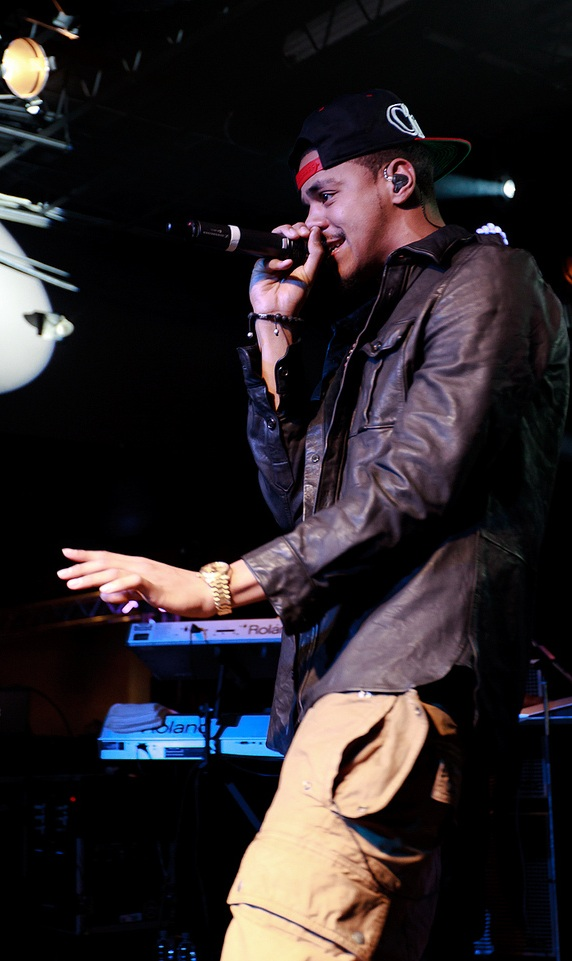
J. Cole performed "Forbidden Fruit" on his "Dollar and a Dream" tour.

"Forbidden Fruit" was the last song recorded and produced by J. Cole for his second album, Born Sinner (2013). It was recorded as a replacement for another song which Cole was forced to remove from the album's track listing after failing to obtain sample clearance from the estate of Jimi Hendrix. The song's production is based around a looped sample of American jazz musician Ronnie Foster's "Mystic Brew", which was also famously sampled by hip hop group A Tribe Called Quest on their 1993 song "Electric Relaxation". Cole was inspired to incorporate the Foster sample into "Forbidden Fruit" after hearing "Electric Relaxation", saying:

I was like, "Oh, man. What if?" You know what I mean? Like, "What if I could just do it my way?" You know what I mean? It's such a classic and people are so afraid to touch classics. And I was just like, "What if I could flip it?" So I just went and found the original sample.

American rapper Kendrick Lamar is featured on "Forbidden Fruit", which is the only track on the standard edition of Born Sinner with a fellow rapper credited as a featured artist. Lamar does not rap a verse on the song; he instead contributes vocals to its refrain. "Forbidden Fruit" contains lyrics referencing Psalms 23 and Born Sinner's release date coinciding with that of Yeezus by American rapper Kanye West.

== Release and promotion ==
At the June 24, 2013 stop in Houston, Texas on the Dollar and a Dream concert tour, J. Cole brought out Kendrick Lamar to perform the song, along with the J. Cole-produced "HiiiPower". In June 2013, MTV reported that "Forbidden Fruit" would be released as the third single from Born Sinner. On August 1, 2013, the song impacted American mainstream urban radio.

== Critical reception ==
"Forbidden Fruit" received mixed reviews from critics. Erin Lowers of Exclaim! cited the song as one of the album's standout tracks, saying that it "embodies a silent confidence, paying homage to a legendary group while speaking on releasing an album the same day as Kanye West, bringing Born Sinner full-circle." Julia Leconte of Now praised Cole's sampling of "Mystic Brew" as done "exceptionally well" and named "Forbidden Fruit" the best track from Born Sinner. David Jeffries of AllMusic expressed a similar sentiment, writing that "Forbidden Fruit" is driven by its "Blue Note-inspired" backbeats.

August Brown of the Los Angeles Times gave the song a negative review, commenting that "Kendrick Lamar somehow packs more personality into a halfhearted hook on 'Forbidden Fruit' than Cole gets in the song". Phillip Mlynar of Spin felt that "[the song's] quirky bass line and warm-keys motif are so recognizable that it's a brow-furrowing challenge to hear anything other than Q-Tip and Phife's original vocals in the space between the beat and the new raps." Mlynar further stated that "Cole himself (along with Kendrick Lamar's guest spot) ends up evaporating entirely — he's upstaged by loftier artists who aren't even there." Contrarily, Ali Shaheed Muhammad of A Tribe Called Quest expressed his appreciation for Cole's production: "[He] didn't like try to do what was already done. [He] brought other parts to the sample that you caught that I was like, 'Oh, nice!'"

== Credits and personnel ==
Credits adapted from the liner notes of Born Sinner.

- J. Cole – lead vocals, songwriting, production
- Ronnie Foster – songwriting, sample credit
- Ron Gilmore – keyboards
- Juro "Mez" Davis – mixing
- Kendrick Lamar – guest vocals

== Charts ==
Chart (2013)	Peak position
US Hot R&B/Hip-Hop Songs (Billboard)	46

== Radio history ==
Country	Date	Format	Label
United States	August 1, 2013	Mainstream urban radio	Roc Nation; Columbia Records
