= Meleni Smith =

American singer-songwriter

- Also known as: Polly A.
- Born: Flint, Michigan, United States
- Origin: Milwaukee, Wisconsin, United States
- Genres: R&B
- Occupation: Singer-songwriter
- Instrument: Vocals
- Years active: 2005–present
- Labels: 222; Columbia
- Website: myheartinfocus.com

Meleni Smith, also known by her stage name Polly A., is an American singer-songwriter from Milwaukee, Wisconsin.

== Early life ==
She was born in Flint, Michigan and raised by a Jamaican mother in Milwaukee, Wisconsin.

== Musical career ==
Previously signed to Columbia Records, she released the EP 'Meet Me in the Bathroom' on August 2, 2005. She is also credited as a composer alongside Toby Gad for the song 'Happy' from the 2005 film Hitch soundtrack. Meleni Smith is credited as being a composer alongside producer Kerry Brothers, producer/songwriter Toby Gad and singer Alicia Keys for the 2009 song "Love is My Disease". She independently released the album 'My Heart in Focus' in February 2012. She was nominated in the 2013 Soul Train Music Awards for Record of the Year for co-writing the song "Crooked Smile" by rapper J. Cole.

In December 2014, Meleni Smith released an EP titled Distorted Fairytales.
