= She Knows (J. Cole song) =

Single by J. Cole featuring Amber Coffman and Cults

from the album Born Sinner
- Released: October 30, 2013
- Recorded: 2013
- Genre: Hip-hop
- Length: 4:57
- Label: Roc Nation; Columbia; Dreamville
- Songwriters: Jermaine Cole; Madeline McKenna; Ryan Mattos
- Producer: J. Cole

J. Cole singles chronology
"Forbidden Fruit" (2013)	"She Knows" (2013)	"Apparently" (2014)

Amber Coffman singles chronology
"Get Free" (2012)	"She Knows" (2013)	"All to Myself" (2017)

Cults singles chronology
"High Road" (2014)	"She Knows" (2014)

Audio sample
- file; help

Music video
- "She Knows" on YouTube

"She Knows" is a song by American rapper J. Cole, released on October 29, 2013, as the fourth single from his second studio album, Born Sinner. The song samples "Bad Things" by Cults and was produced by J. Cole.

== Background and recording ==
After his Grammy Awards nomination, Cole revealed that he was working on another album with Kendrick Lamar, later revealed to be Born Sinner. The album was delayed, before being released on June 18, 2013, a week earlier than the expected release date. The song is produced by J. Cole himself and samples Cults "Bad Things".

The lyrics represents Cole apologizing for cheating on his girlfriend, with a lack of sympathy by intending that "bad things were intended for him". He later expresses guilt about his seduction, ending the song.

== Music video ==
On February 14, 2014, the accompanying video for "She Knows" was released on Cole's Vevo channel.

The video was filmed in South Los Angeles, including Johnnie L. Cochran Jr. Middle School and Pink Motel. The music video was directed by Sam Pilling. The music video included appearances from Harold Perrineau and Rochelle Aytes acting as the parents. The video follows a boy named Kyle who steals money from a drawer at home. Instead of going to school, he and his friend sneak into a private skate park. Eventually a police officer sees them and the two just barely manage to escape. Kyle returns home and to his shock, sees his mother cheating with another man (Cole). Kyle runs out of the house and his friend chases him to console him.

== Reception ==
"She Knows" received generally mixed reviews. In a review for AllMusic, David Jeffries states: "It's snide, smart-ass stuff and when it comes to sublime/ridiculous balancing act that his heroes Jay-Z and Nas have mastered, Cole is a little short on the sublime side here to be considered classic." However, American magazine XXL named the song repetitive.

Ten years after its release, "She Knows" trended on TikTok, being featured in 230,000 videos. The trend later deviated from regular activities to conspiracy theories involving rapper Sean "Diddy" Combs after his sexual conduct allegations were publicized.

On September 30, 2024, the song was removed from YouTube amid controversy between SESAC and YouTube itself.

== Personnel ==
=== Music ===
- J. Cole – producer
- Cults – sample producer

=== Video ===
- Sam Pilling – director
- Harold Perrineau – actor
- Rochelle Aytes – actor

== Charts ==
=== Weekly charts ===
Chart (2014)	Peak position
Netherlands Urban (MegaCharts)	46
UK Singles (Official Charts)	68
US Billboard Hot 100	90
US Hot R&B/Hip-Hop Songs (Billboard)	24
US Rhythmic Airplay (Billboard)	10

Chart (2021)	Peak position
Global 200 (Billboard)	175
Lithuania (AGATA)	47

=== Year-end charts ===
Chart (2014)	Position
US Hot R&B/Hip-Hop Songs (Billboard)	98

== Certifications ==
Region	Certification	Certified units/sales
Australia (ARIA)	Platinum	70,000^{‡}
Brazil (Pro-Música Brasil)	Platinum	60,000^{‡}
Denmark (IFPI Danmark)	Gold	45,000^{‡}
United Kingdom (BPI)	Platinum	600,000^{‡}
^{‡} Sales+streaming figures based on certification alone.
