= Let Nas Down =

Song by J. Cole

from the album Born Sinner
- Released: June 18, 2013
- Recorded: 2012
- Genre: Hip hop, jazz rap
- Length: 4:37
- Label: Dreamville; Roc Nation; Columbia
- Songwriters: Jermaine Cole; Anthony Parrino; Fela Kuti
- Producer: J. Cole

"Let Nas Down" is a song by American hip hop recording artist J. Cole, taken from his second studio album Born Sinner (2013). The song was produced by Cole himself as a dedication to one of his idols, fellow American rapper Nas, with whom Cole was often compared to early in his career. He sampled the song "Gentleman" by Fela Kuti. The song peaked at #55 on the Hot R&B/Hip-Hop Songs.

== Background ==
Growing up, J. Cole idolized American rapper Nas, even pasting his rap verses on his wall. Once J. Cole signed to Roc Nation in 2009, he began preparing his debut album Cole World: The Sideline Story. On May 31, 2010, he released the first single "Who Dat", which failed to garner commercial success. Cole tried harder to find a good hit record for his record label. Through that long process, Cole had countless meetings with Jay-Z to discuss new songs he had made. Although Jay backed them as good songs, Roc Nation concluded that none of them were hits. Cole explained that soon after all these dead ends,

One night I was in this hotel room after a show and I was listening to The College Dropout, as I do. And on the worst song on that album, which is my favorite album, so I'm not dissing. But on the worse song on that album, "The New Workout Plan," I heard the shit that I had been hearing for like—eight years now. I heard it different as a producer like oh shit... made a rough version of the beat right there in the hotel room. By the time I got back to Europe a few days later I had "Work Out".

"Work Out" would become the highly successful lead single from his debut album, peaking at number 13 on the Billboard Hot 100. Following its release as a single, J. Cole received a phone call from his mentor and producer No ID. No ID told Cole that he was in the studio with Nas, and that Nas had told him that he hated the song "Work Out". Cole was devastated upon hearing that, which made him write the tribute song to his idol, "Let Nas Down", the following year. Less than a week after creating and recording the song, Cole ran into Nas at a Houston airport at six in the morning boarding the same flight as him. Nas ended up sitting behind him, with Cole playing the song for him. Nas felt honored by the song and was very impressed by it.

A month prior to Born Sinner's release, Cole previewed the song for New York radio personality Peter Rosenberg, where he reported the title as "I Disappointed Nas", which Cole laughed off as incorrect. The song has been compared to Kanye West's "Big Brother" and Nas' "Unauthorized Biography of Rakim", due to the similar content of all three songs discussing the artists' relationship with their mentors. Leading up to its release, it was the album's most discussed song.

== Critical reception ==
The song would receive mixed reviews from music critics. XXL called the song the album's most honest moment, and its best track along with the two singles "Crooked Smile" and "Power Trip." Spin said of the song, "Instead of resonating as an emotive confessional, the song only spotlights the lack of fire on Born Sinner." The Boston Globe said the song was "too insular to make its bigger points."

The response from the song would result in Nas and J. Cole covering the Summer issue of Vibe, along with a dual interview discussing lyricism, their influences and "Let Nas Down", among other things.

== Remix ==
Shortly before the release of Born Sinner, Nas began working on a remix to the song. On June 24, 2013, the song "Made Nas Proud" was released. Throughout the song, Nas details the situation from his side and praises Cole, being understanding of the importance of having commercial songs. Upon its release, it was met with universal critical acclaim. The remix was named one of the best songs of the first half of 2013 by Complex.

== Credits and personnel ==
Credits adapted from the liner notes of Born Sinner.

- J. Cole – lead vocals, songwriting, production
- A. Kuti – songwriting, sample credit
- Elite – songwriting
- Nate Jones – bass
- Juro "Mez" Davis – mixing

== Charts ==
Chart (2013)	Peak position
US Hot R&B/Hip-Hop Songs (Billboard)	55
