= Rue Royale (band) =

Anglo-American indie folk band

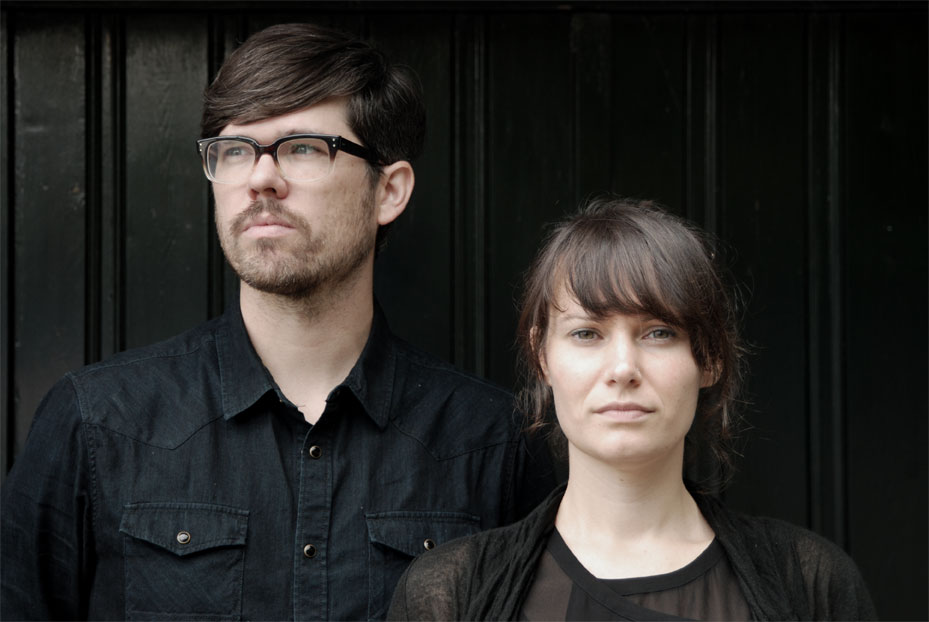

Background information
- Origin: Nottingham, England
- Genres: Indie, Pop, Ambient, Folk, Indie folk
- Years active: 2006-present
- Label: Sinnbus
- Members: Brookln Dekker; Ruth Dekker
- Website: Official website

Rue Royale is an Anglo-American indie folk band based in Nottingham, England. The band was formed in Chicago by the married couple Brookln and Ruth Dekker in 2006. "We play hypnotic indie-folk-pop influenced by American and British folk, soul and rock." says Brookln.

Initially based in Chicago, the band's first release The Search for Where to Go EP was self-released in January 2007. "Once we decided to start a band, we hit it running. We decided the next day (literally) to write and record a 5 song ep in 6 weeks time." After a year of playing the Chicago circuit, Rue Royale recorded their self-titled full length Rue Royale and took it on their first European tour from 1 March – 30 April 2008. The tour consisted of 31 concerts in six countries including: United Kingdom, France, Belgium, Luxembourg, Netherlands and Germany.

After the band's premier European tour, they decided to uproot their homestead in Chicago and relocate to the UK in order to tour Europe full-time.

In 2010, the band recorded their Wapping Press Session EP with producer Paul Pilot.

2011 saw the self-recorded and released second album Guide to an Escape. Again the band enlisted the help of Paul Pilot in mixing the album. In March 2012, Sinnbus re-released Guide to an Escape in Germany, Austria and Switzerland. Then following the release in March Sinnbus went on to extend the release to France and Italy in August.

Rue Royale released their third full-length album Remedies Ahead in September 2013. Mercedes Benz featured the first single "Set Out To Discover" and called it "tender yet sprawling folk pop".

The band is also known for their handmade CD packaging and bespoke merchandise.

== Film and television ==
- Rue Royale's song "Parachutes and Lifeboats" was featured on the soundtrack of Judson Pearce Morgan's film The Collective.
- Rue Royale's song "Even In The Darkness" has been featured on MTV's Engaged and Underaged Episode 208.
- Rue Royale's song "Parachutes and Lifeboats" has been featured on MTV's Exiled Episode 109.
- Rue Royale's song "These Long Roads" has been featured on MTV's Teen Mom Episode 111.
- Rue Royale's song "Tell Me When You Go" has been featured on MTV's Teen Mom Episode 105.
- Rue Royale's song "Shouldn’t Have Closed My Eyes" has been featured on MTV's Catfish
- Rue Royale were on ZDFkultur's TV Noir, in 2013 with Thees Uhlman.
- Rue Royale performed on 8 April 2014 as guest stars an acoustic version of their song "Guide to an Escape" in the German TV crime movie series Polizeiruf 110, episode "Käfer und Prinzessin".
- Rue Royale's song "UFO" was covered in 2018 on season 11 of the Danish X Factor by Place on Earth with Dorit Chrysler.

== Collaborations ==
- In 2012, Rue Royale co-wrote "Lazerman" with Swiss rapper Greis. Lazerman was the second track on Greis's album entitled "Me Love". "Me Love" entered the Swiss charts at number 6 and stayed in the charts for 8 weeks.
- Rue Royale's song "Flightline" was sampled in J. Cole's song "Miss America" which was released on 13 November 2012. "Miss America" (which peaked at No. 34 on the Hot R&B/Hip-Hop Songs chart) was the first single from the album Born Sinner which debuted at number two on the Billboard 200 chart, selling 297,000 copies in its first week of release. After two weeks of being at number two, Born Sinner climbed to number one in its third week. As of 19 September 2013, the album has sold over 599,000 copies in the United States.

== Discography ==
- The Search for Where to Go (2007) EP
- Rue Royale (2008)
- "Tell Me When You Go" (2009) 7" single
- Christmas EP (2010)
- Wapping Press Session (2010) Tour EP
- "Halfway Blind" (2011) 7" single
- Guide to an Escape (2011)
- Remedies Ahead (2013)
- In Parallel (2018)
