= Truly Yours 2 =

EP by J. Cole
- Released: April 30, 2013
- Recorded: 2012–2013
- Genre: Hip hop
- Length: 23:05
- Label: Roc Nation
- Producer: J. Cole; Canei Finch; Jake One; Ron Gilmore Jr.

J. Cole chronology
Truly Yours (2013)	Truly Yours 2 (2013)	Born Sinner (2013)

Truly Yours 2 is the second EP by American rapper J. Cole. It was released digitally for free download and stream on April 30, 2013. The EP features guest appearances from Young Jeezy, 2 Chainz and Bas. Production came from J. Cole, Canei Finch, Jake One, and Ron Gilmore. The EP has been downloaded over 500,000 times on mixtape site DatPiff.

== Background ==
The series consists of songs that Cole knew would not make the cutlist for his second studio album Born Sinner. The free EP was released as a trilogy, with the third being released as the deluxe edition of Born Sinner.

== Critical reception ==
Writing for HipHopDX, Omar Burgess praised Truly Yours 2 saying, "Born Sinner will be the ultimate test of Cole’s desire to grow and experiment as he pointed out in the letter that accompanied Truly Yours. This short set indicates he’s taking steps in the right direction, and his next full-length effort will hopefully appease his old and newer fans." Burgess also praised Truly Yours 2 saying, "both casual fans and Cole stans alike can package these six songs with the first Truly Yours and have something that competes with a lot of albums in the marketplace."

== Track listing ==
Truly Yours 2 track listing
No.	Title	Writer(s)	Producer(s)	Length
1.	"Cole Summer"	Jermaine Cole	J. Cole	4:51
2.	"Kenny Lofton" (featuring Young Jeezy)	Cole; Jay Jenkins	Canei Finch	5:19
3.	"Chris Tucker" (featuring 2 Chainz)	Cole; Tauheed Epps	Cole; Finch	3:03
4.	"Head Bussa"	Cole	Cole	3:22
5.	"Cousins" (featuring Bas)	Cole; Abbas Hamad	Cole; Ron Gilmore Jr.	3:43
6.	"3 Wishes"	Cole	Jake One	3:27
Total length:				23:05

Notes

- "Kenny Lofton" was also featured on Young Jeezy's mixtape, "The Poems of Jay Jenkins".
- "Cousins" was also featured on Bas' mixtape, "Quarter Water Raised Me Vol. II".

Sample credits

- "Cole Summer" interpolates "Juicy" by The Notorious B.I.G. and samples "Nothing Even Matters" by Lauryn Hill.
- "Kenny Lofton" samples "Hurt" by The Manhattans.
- "Chris Tucker" interpolates "Niggas in Paris" by Jay Z and Kanye West.
- "Head Bussa" samples "Interlude4U" by Trey Songz.
