= Work Out (song) =

2011 single by J. Cole

Single by J. Cole

from the album Cole World: The Sideline Story
- Released: June 15, 2011
- Recorded: 2011
- Genre: Hip hop; R&B
- Length: 3:54
- Label: Roc Nation; Columbia
- Songwriters: Jermaine Cole; Elliot Wolff; Kanye West; John Stephens; Miri Ben-Ari; Sumeke Rainey; Bosco Kante
- Producer: J. Cole

J. Cole singles chronology
"Feel Love" (2011)	"Work Out" (2011)	"Trouble" (2011)

Music video
- "Work Out" on YouTube

"Work Out" is a song by American hip hop recording artist J. Cole, and released as the lead single from his debut studio album Cole World: The Sideline Story (2011). The song was officially released on June 27, 2011, through Roc Nation and Columbia. Nas voiced his displeasure with the song, which inspired Cole to create the song "Let Nas Down" for his album Born Sinner. It interpolates the chorus from "Straight Up" by Paula Abdul, and samples the ending production of "The New Workout Plan" by Kanye West.

== Background ==
J. Cole released "Work Out" on June 15, 2011, in honor of the second anniversary of his highly acclaimed mixtape The Warm Up. The song, produced by Cole himself, samples "The New Workout Plan" by Kanye West and interpolates "Straight Up" by Paula Abdul. The song is featured as a bonus track on Cole World: The Sideline Story.

== Chart performance ==
"Work Out" charted on the U.S. Billboard Hot 100 on the week of July 23, 2011 at number eighty-five. "Work Out" re-entered the Billboard Hot 100 on week of September 24, 2011 at number ninety-eight. The song has since peaked at number thirteen. As of September 2013, the song has sold 1,853,000 downloads in the United States. On May 6, 2013, the single was certified double platinum by the Recording Industry Association of America (RIAA) for sales of over a two million digital copies in the United States.

== Charts ==
=== Weekly charts ===
Chart (2011–2012)	Peak position
Canada Hot 100 (Billboard)	32
US Billboard Hot 100	13
US Hot R&B/Hip-Hop Songs (Billboard)	10
US Hot Rap Songs (Billboard)	3
US Pop Airplay (Billboard)	13
US Rhythmic Airplay (Billboard)	1

=== Year-end charts ===
Chart (2011)	Position
US Hot R&B/Hip-Hop Songs (Billboard)	85
Chart (2012)	Position
US Billboard Hot 100	63
US Hot R&B/Hip-Hop Songs (Billboard)	64
US Rhythmic (Billboard)	8

== Certifications ==
Region	Certification	Certified units/sales
Australia (ARIA)	3× Platinum	210,000^{‡}
Canada (Music Canada)	Gold	40,000^{*}
Denmark (IFPI Danmark)	Gold	45,000^{‡}
New Zealand (RMNZ)	7× Platinum	210,000^{‡}
United Kingdom (BPI)	Platinum	600,000^{‡}
United States (RIAA)	2× Platinum	2,000,000
^{*} Sales figures based on certification alone.^{‡} Sales+streaming figures based on certification alone.

== Release history ==
Country	Date	Version	Format	Label	Ref
United States	June 27, 2011	Single version	Digital download	Roc Nation	
United States	October 17, 2011	J Farell Remix	Digital download	Roc Nation; Columbia	
