= Crooked Smile =

Single by J. Cole featuring TLC

from the album Born Sinner
- Released: June 4, 2013
- Studio: Premier (NYC)
- Genre: Hip hop; R&B
- Length: 4:39
- Label: Roc Nation; Columbia
- Songwriters: Jermaine Cole; Meleni Smith
- Producer: J. Cole

J. Cole singles chronology
"Power Trip" (2013)	"Crooked Smile" (2013)	"Forbidden Fruit" (2013)

TLC singles chronology
"Let's Just Do It" (2009)	"Crooked Smile" (2013)	"Gift Wrapped Kiss" (2014)

Music video
- "Crooked Smile" on YouTube

"Crooked Smile" is a song by American rapper J. Cole from his second studio album, Born Sinner (2013). Featuring a guest appearance from girl group TLC, the song includes additional vocals from Meleni Smith. It was produced by Cole, with co-production from Elite. Cole recruited TLC after coming up with the hook, going through a lengthy and strenuous recording process. After Cole previewed the song in October 2012, it was released for digital download in the United States by Roc Nation as the album's second single on June 4, 2013. A hip hop and R&B ballad with dance elements, it features a jazz groove and a sample of Jennifer Hudson's "No One Gonna Love You".

Lyrically, the song sees Cole encourage embracing one's flaws and self-acceptance. "Crooked Smile" received generally positive reviews from music critics, who mostly praised Cole's lyricism. Reviewers focused on his authentic message and some highlighted the composition, while a few critics commended TLC's presence. The song peaked at number 27 on the US Billboard Hot 100, alongside reaching number seven on the US Hot R&B/Hip-Hop Songs chart. It was awarded platinum and silver certifications in the United States and the United Kingdom by the Recording Industry Association of America (RIAA) and British Phonographic Industry (BPI), respectively.

An accompanying music video was released in September 2013, which Sheldon Candis directed after Roc Nation phoned him and he met Cole at the Los Angeles International Airport. The music video depicts Cole as a marijuana dealer, and he celebrates his sister's birthday with their family until the Drug Enforcement Administration raid the house and kill her. This was intended as a tribute to the killing of Aiyana Mo'Nay Stanley-Jones in a 2010 police raid, whose mother, Dominika Jones, was grateful for the scene. Cole performed "Crooked Smile" live with the Roots at the 2013 Philly 4th of July Jam, later singing it with TLC at that year's iHeartRadio Music Festival, smiling while rapping.

== Background ==
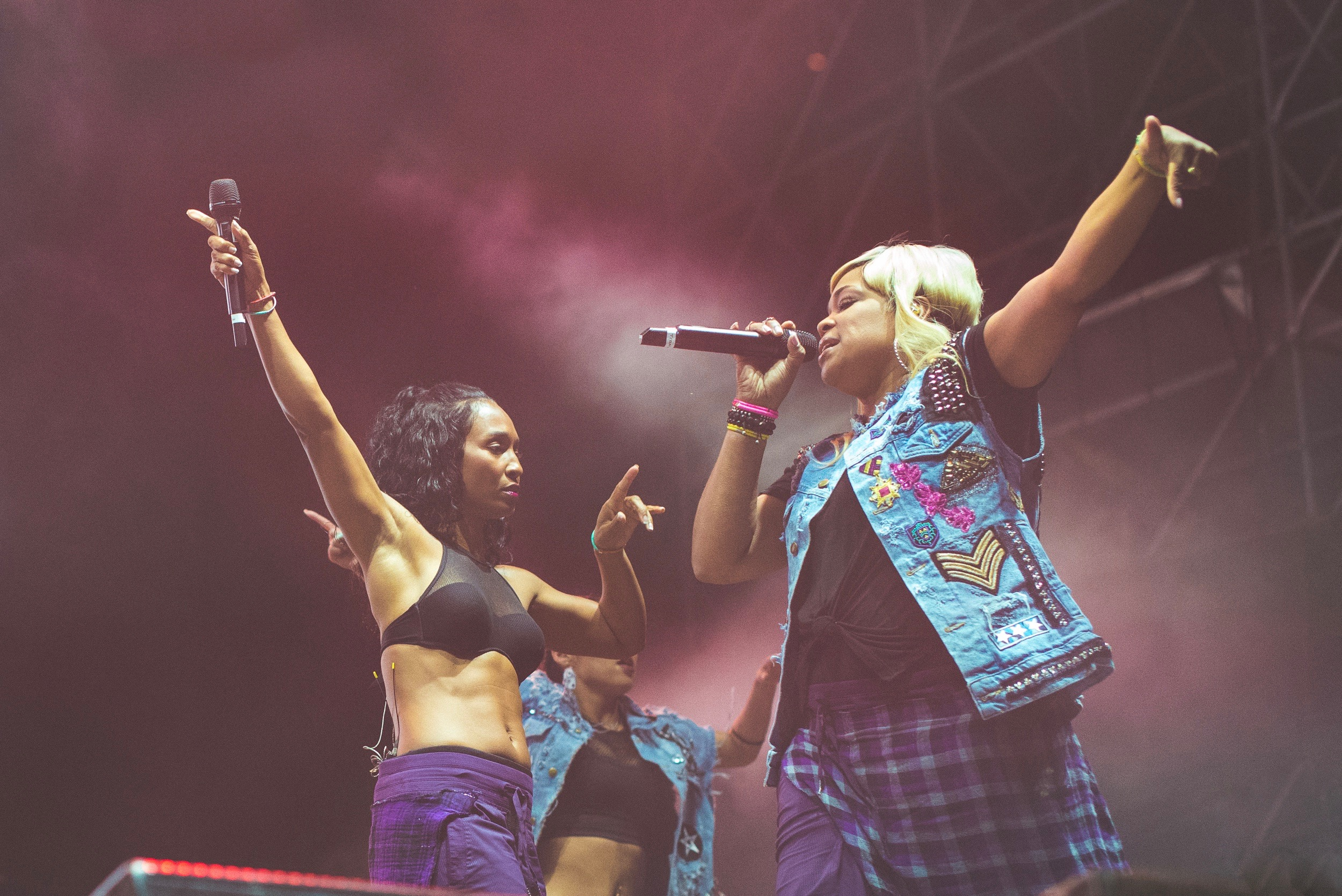
The song features a guest appearance from TLC, who Cole sought out to collaborate with after envisioning the hook.

In an interview for Power 106 on June 13, 2013, Cole explained that the song's recording process was his longest and most strenuous because of the potential he saw. He thought TLC would be ideal after coming up with the hook, finding collaborating with them to be "crazy" and "far-fetched". Cole was a fan of TLC's musicianship on the likes of "Unpretty" (1999) and "Waterfalls" (1995); he worked with the members in separate studios, meeting T-Boz in Los Angeles and then flying to Atlanta for Chilli. Chilli danced to his songs, an experience he highly appreciated. After achieving success, Cole felt insistent on keeping his "crooked smile". Two months after Cole's interview, T-Boz revealed that he contacted TLC. She understood that the song's message is what the group stood for and lauded Cole as an artist, gaining respect for him due to his deep lyricism and production. In his six-minute MTV documentary "Life & Rhymes: J. Cole - Crooked Smile" from October 2012, Cole discussed re-writing the song's verses repeatedly. He did this to have a broader appeal than rap, rather than a song "about his smile or his teeth". Cole co-wrote it with additional vocalist Meleni Smith, while he handled the production and Elite served as co-producer. The song was set out as a theme song of the album's second half, which represents seeing the light mentally.

In an interview for Fuse, Cole compared the song to deceased rapper 2Pac's "Keep Ya Head Up" (1993) and explained its empowerment message, encouraging people to embrace their flaws and "not to be so caught up in the little things". At a concert for Footaction in Hollywood on October 19, 2012, Cole previewed "Crooked Smile" and a track titled "Man on Fire", although no release on a project was known initially. "Crooked Smile" was later released as a single for Born Sinner in June 2013, a day after Cole performed the lead single "Power Trip" at Summer Jam XX. The song also premiered on SoundCloud. On January 28, 2014, the original version of the song was released on Dreamville Records' compilation Revenge of the Dreamers, which celebrated Cole's partnership with the label.

== Composition and lyrics ==
Musically, "Crooked Smile" is a hip hop and R&B ballad, with elements of dance music. The song features a jazz groove that relies on piano chords and contains a sample of the 2011 single "No One Gonna Love You", performed by singer and actress Jennifer Hudson. Keys, guitar, percussion, and bass are featured, while Ken Lewis handled the choir and string arrangements. It is set as Born Sinner's centerpiece, representing progressing to the light from the darkness. TLC appear on the hook, which adds to the R&B style.

In the lyrics of "Crooked Smile", Cole focuses on embracing one's flaws for empowerment, encouraging self-acceptance instead of being a conformist. TLC replies to those who had tried to bring them down on the hook, singing that "like the sun know you know I found my way back round". Cole admits his smile is not perfect, declaring that he keeps his "twisted grill" to be real. He stresses the important of inner beauty as he raps that women cannot face what's wrong when looking in the mirror, not needing to fix themselves.

== Release and reception ==
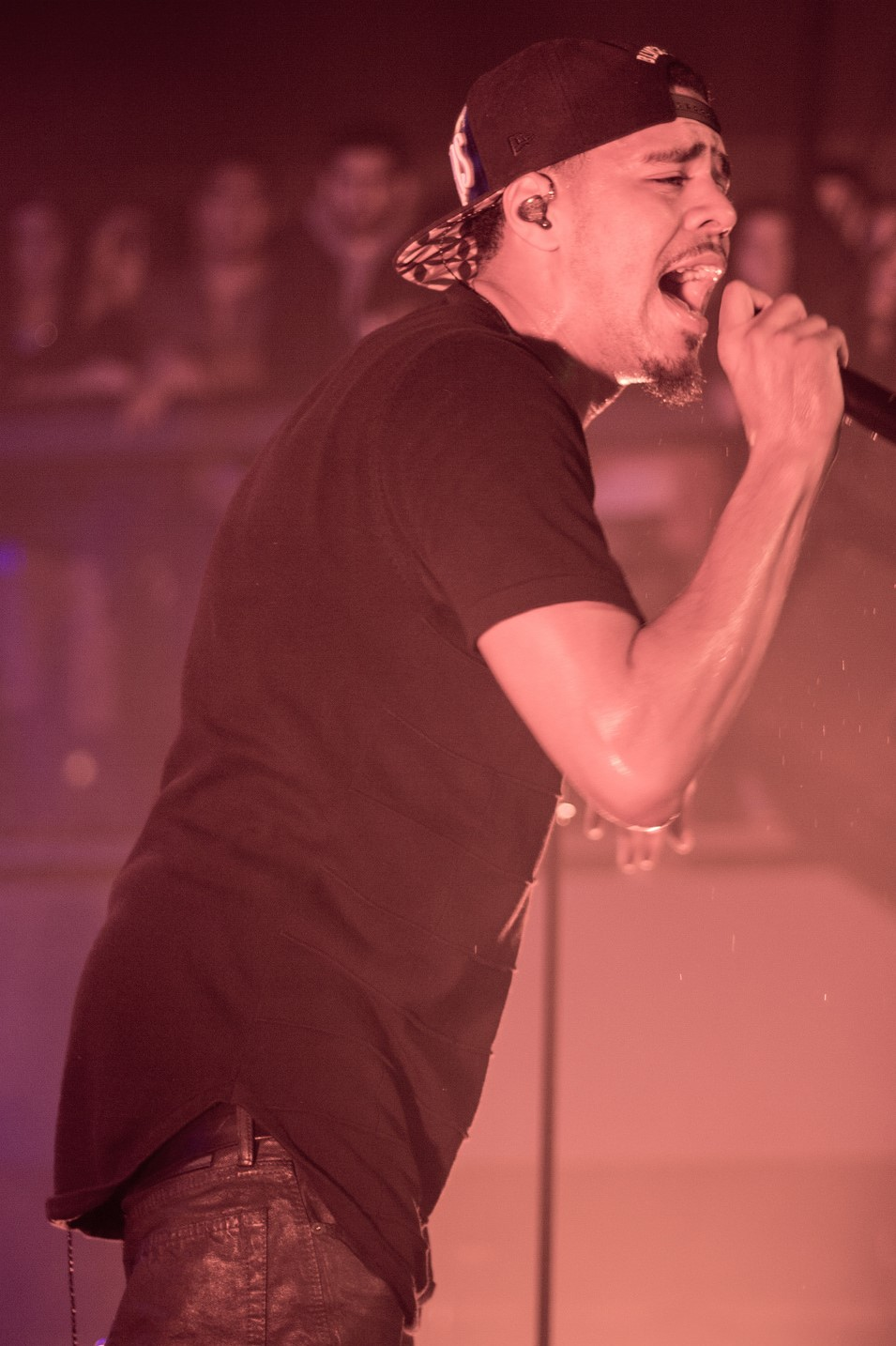
Multiple reviewers were impressed with the authenticity of Cole's message.

On June 4, 2013, the song was released for digital download in the United States by Roc Nation as the album's second single. "Crooked Smile" was included as the 14th track on Cole's second studio album Born Sinner on June 18, 2013. It was later released to US rhythmic contemporary radio stations on July 23, through Roc Nation and Columbia Records. The labels serviced the song to US contemporary hit radio stations on September 16, 2013.

"Crooked Smile" was met with generally positive reviews from music critics, with them mostly praising the lyrical content. In a review of the song for MTV, Jenna Hally Rubenstein highlighted Cole's lyricism and TLC's appearance that she heavily compared to "Unpretty", as well as praising the piano instrumentation. Erika Ramirez of Billboard described the song as "an uplifting ode to all those who continue to hold their heads up", which "goes hand-in-hand" with "Unpretty" due to the self-love theme. AllMusic's David Jeffries said that with TLC's appearance, the song is a "genuine, mature step in the right direction" for Cole and will easily reach "vintage age". PopMatters reviewer Francesca D'Arcy-Orga named it as an album highlight that sees Cole embrace "his own supposed flaws" and encourage acceptance amongst others. At USA Today, Brian Mansfield and Jerry Shriver crowned it song of the week and thought the song is hard to find flaws with as it "celebrates beauty in imperfection", featuring "a jazzy, piano-based groove" that Cole skillfully changes subjects over. In Slant Magazine, Ted Scheinman noted the song's emotional appeal and that Cole "serves as [a] motivational speaker", consoling a woman for her different aspects and offering his talent of "turning heavy ballad material into a club-banging dance track".

Other reviews noted the emotional impact of "Crooked Smile". August Brown from the Los Angeles Times called the song "soulful and rousing", considering that Cole is tough "on his perfectly acceptable orthodontics". For XXL, Ben Simms picked the song as one of Born Sinner's best tracks since Cole "embraces the persona that initially garnered him praise". Jesal 'Jay Soul' Padania from RapReviews envisioned the "catchy and heartfelt TLC-featuring hit" receiving airplay with a large budget video and thought it initially seems insincere, yet "the message is worth the saccharin". The Source's Kyle Renwick named the song as one of a couple tracks towards the album's end that add value. In a mixed review at Pitchfork, Corban Goble put forward that the song can be interpreted either "as a breezy style mash-up or as sacrilege". HipHopDX's Jesse Fairfax believed that the song does not fit the album's "prevalent darker tone" outside of any commercial appeal, while ZCamp of Tiny Mix Tapes criticized the "nondescript piano" as bland and boring.

=== Accolades ===
"Crooked Smile" was crowned by Capital Xtra as the best song of 2013, with the staff declaring that it lived up to the promise of a Cole and TLC collaboration. Rolling Stone ranked the song as the year's 37th best; the staff wrote that the piano chords resemble fellow rapper Kanye West's 2004 debut The College Dropout and Cole tackles insecurities, providing "lush soul rap that's uplifting but never boring". At the 2013 BET Hip Hop Awards, "Crooked Smile" was awarded Impact Track. The song was nominated for The Ashford and Simpson Songwriter's Award at the 2013 Soul Train Music Awards. In 2021, NME named it as one of Cole's 10 best songs ever.

== Music video ==
=== Background ===
T-Boz first announced that a music video was in the works for "Crooked Smile", which was filmed on August 29, 2013, according to MTV. The music video was shot by director Sheldon Candis, who received a phone call from Roc Nation requesting "to create an emotional moving and cinematic music driven short film" with Cole, as he had fans of his 2012 film LUV at the label. Candis then approached Cole when he was at the Los Angeles International Airport catching a red-eye to New York (NY), introducing himself as he held his MacBook and offered to show him the film's trailer. Cole was taken in emotionally by the trailer after seeing Wendy searching for his mother and also interested in the story; he told Candis, "You're my guy."

After much anticipation, the music video was released on September 18, 2013. It includes a tribute to Dominika Jones' deceased 7-year-old daughter Aiyana Mo'Nay Stanley-Jones, who was killed in a police raid at her Detroit home in 2010, and a message for the US government's war on drugs. Jones voiced her gratitude for Cole's tribute on Twitter, while Candis tweeted to her that he prays Stanley-Jones' "spirit will continue to live on". Candis said the response to the visual was "amazing and overwhelming", noticing it went viral alongside "a rapid sharing of the social message". He noted the "immediate dialogue" and expressed heavy happiness for Jones "having her daughter's life honored and spirit carried on", through the release. Chairman of Justice for the Stanley-Jones' committee Roland Lawrence issued a statement applauding Cole's thoughtfulness, recognizing that the video "hopefully will call us all on the table as it pertains to injustice in America" and everywhere else. Despite being featured on the song, TLC does not appear in its video.

=== Synopsis and accolades ===
The music video begins with interspersed shots of Cole and a Drug Enforcement Administration (DEA) agent going through similar morning routines, first brushing their teeth. Flashes are shown of the agent with his daughter having breakfast as Cole celebrates the birthday of his sister of the same age, holding a home barbeque. He is eventually revealed as a marijuana dealer, and sets the stage for a DEA raid on his home during the night. The raid occurs following the depiction of the agent's planning, drawing parallels to the police raid that took place in 2010. Cole is arrested by the DEA agent and watches as his sister is accidentally shot and killed upon being found, while he reflects on the preceding day's events of the family. The music video ends with two messages: a dedication reading "For Aiyana Stanley-Jones"; and one for the government "And please reconsider your war on drugs".

At the 2014 MTV Video Music Awards, the music video was nominated for Best Video with a Social Message. It also received a nominated for Best Hip Hop Video at the 2014 BET Hip Hop Awards.

== Commercial performance ==
"Crooked Smile" entered the US Billboard Hot 100 at number 74 for the issue dated July 6, 2013, before peaking at number 27 on the chart issue of October 5. The song lasted for 20 weeks on the Hot 100 and as of August 8, 2016, it ranks as Cole's third biggest hit on the chart. The song became Cole's fifth top 10 hit on the US Hot R&B/Hip-Hop Songs chart by peaking at number seven, while it reached number three on the Rhythmic chart. On September 2, 2016, "Crooked Smile" was certified platinum by the Recording Industry Association of America (RIAA) for pushing 1,000,000 certified units in the US, becoming Cole's fifth single to achieve the certification. The song debuted at number 114 on the UK Singles Chart and on March 18, 2022, it was certified silver by the British Phonographic Industry (BPI) for shelving 200,000 units in the United Kingdom.

== Live performances ==
Cole first performed "Crooked Smile" at the end of his set for Footaction's "Own the Stage" event in W Hotels' Hollywood location on October 19, 2012. He performed the song at a private show in New York City (NYC) on June 4, 2013. On June 12, Cole delivered a rendition of it with backing from live instrumentation on Power 106's series 'Backstage Breakfast'. He performed the song for SiriusXM on June 28, 2013, introducing it by focusing on embracing yourself despite people finding flaws. At the 2013 BET Awards, Cole performed the song solo as he sat on a stool, and Born Sinner's cover art flashed in the background. He performed it with backing band the Roots at the 2013 Philly 4th of July Jam, rocking a Toledo Mud Hens baseball jersey and camouflage shorts. Cole sat on a stool for an introduction, discussing television images and offering that he is frequently reminded "that my eyebrows is real thick and my smile ain't perfect". He performed the song at VH1's 2013 Do Something Awards, with Hudson singing the hook in place of TLC. Cole served as a musical guest on TBS' Conan on August 13, 2013, performing the song. He was flanked by a live band and two female backup singers, who sang the hook.

Cole performed the song with TLC at the 2013 iHeartRadio Music Festival in Las Vegas, standing as their first joint performance, and the group came out during his introduction to cheers from the crowd. TLC wore futuristic black costumes that resembled the group in their 1999 video for "No Scrubs", interacting with the audience as they danced and Cole rapped with a smile. Cole performed the song at the Ed Sullivan Theater in Manhattan, NY for the Late Show with David Letterman on November 5, 2013, marking his first appearance on the show since 2011. He was supported by a string quartet, a DJ, a backing band, and a pair of female singers that delivered TLC's part, increasing from his line-up on Conan. Cole wore a leather jacket and a hat facing backward for the performance, which David Letterman called "Fantastic!" as he blew a kiss to the line-up. On August 4, 2015, Cole performed the song for a concert at Madison Square Garden in NYC on his Forest Hills Drive tour. During his appearance on Day 2 of the 2016 Billboard Hot 100 Festival at Nikon at Jones Beach Theater in Wantagh, NY, Cole performed it for his encore.

== Credits and personnel ==
Credits adapted from the liner notes of Born Sinner.

Recording

- Recorded and mixed at Premier Studios, New York City

Personnel

- J. Cole – songwriter, producer
- Meleni Smith – songwriter, additional vocals
- Elite – co-producer
- Ron Gilmore – keys
- Dave Linaburg – guitar
- Courtnee Rose – percussion
- Al Carty – bass
- Ken Lewis – choir arrangement, string arrangement
- Hanan Rubinstein – vocal engineer, sound engineer
- Juro "Mez" Davis – recorder, mix engineer
- Sam Giannelli – assistant mix engineer

== Charts ==
=== Weekly charts ===
Chart performance for "Crooked Smile"
Chart (2013)	Peak position
Belgium (Ultratip Bubbling Under Flanders)	88
Belgium (Ultratip Bubbling Under Wallonia)	50
UK Singles (OCC)	114
UK Hip Hop/R&B (Official Charts)	22
US Billboard Hot 100	27
US Hot R&B/Hip-Hop Songs (Billboard)	7
US Pop Airplay (Billboard)	27
US Rhythmic Airplay (Billboard)	3

=== Year-end charts ===
2013 year-end chart performance for "Crooked Smile"
Chart (2013)	Position
US Hot R&B/Hip-Hop Songs (Billboard)	25
US Radio Songs (Billboard)	61
US Rhythmic (Billboard)	13

== Certifications ==
Certifications for "Crooked Smile"
Region	Certification	Certified units/sales
New Zealand (RMNZ)	2× Platinum	60,000^{‡}
United Kingdom (BPI)	Silver	200,000^{‡}
United States (RIAA)	Platinum	1,000,000^{‡}
^{‡} Sales+streaming figures based on certification alone.

== Release history ==
Release dates and formats for "Crooked Smile"
Region	Date	Format(s)	Label(s)	Ref.
United States	June 4, 2013	Digital download	Roc Nation	
United States	July 23, 2013	Rhythmic contemporary radio	Roc Nation; Columbia	
United States	September 16, 2013	Contemporary hit radio	Roc Nation; Columbia	

== See also ==
- Unpretty
