= Effected =

Studio album by Cozz
- Released: February 13, 2018
- Recorded: 2017
- Studio: The Sheltuh, Raleigh; No Excuses Studio, Santa Monica
- Genre: West Coast hip hop
- Length: 50:43
- Label: Dreamville; Interscope; Tha Committee
- Producer: Ibrahim Hamad (exec.); J. Cole (also exec.); Anthony Ware; Beat Butcha; Cardiak; Chef Mitchell; DJ C May; DJ Wes; Dontae Winslow; Elite; Enimal; Hollywood JB; Louie Ji; Meez; Tae Beast; Mike Almighty; Ron Gilmore; Soul Professa; Uncle Dave

Cozz chronology
Nothin' Personal (2016)	Effected (2018)

Singles from Effected
- 1. "Questions" Released: January 5, 2018; 2. "Demons N Distractions" Released: March 1, 2018; 3. "Bout It" Released: May 22, 2018

Effected is the second studio album by American rapper Cozz. It was released on February 13, 2018, by Dreamville Records, Interscope Records and Tha Committee Records. The album features guest appearances from J. Cole, Kendrick Lamar, Currensy and Garren. The album features production from a variety of record producers, including J. Cole, Meez, Cardiak, Elite, Ron Gilmore, Tae Beast, and Hollywood JB (from Spillage Village) among others. Effected debuted at number 18 on the US Top Heatseekers chart and received generally positive reviews from critics.

== Promotion ==
On January 5, 2018, Cozz released the lead single "Questions", accompanied by a music video on January 8. Cozz released three more songs prior to the album, "Badu" featuring Currensy on January 19, "Ignorant Confidence" on January 26, and "Bout It" featuring Garren on February 5. Cozz revealed the album's release date and tracklist on February 5, 2018.

Ahead of the album's release, Cozz released a 10-minute documentary titled, Cozz: Effected on February 12, 2018. A video for "Demons N Distractions" was released on March 1, 2018. On March 22, 2018, Cozz released the music video for "Bout It" featuring Garren. On April 4, 2018, Cozz announced The Effected Tour to further promote the album.

== Critical reception ==
Professional ratings
Aggregate scores
Source	Rating
Metacritic	76/100
Review scores
Source	Rating
2DOPEBOYZ	(favorable)
Exclaim!	7/10
HipHopDX	3.9/5 stars
Salute Magazine	5/5 stars
Pitchfork	6.8/10
Respect.	(favorable)
XXL	(XL)

Upon its release, Effected received generally positive reviews by music critics. At Metacritic, which assigns a normalized rating out of 100 to reviews from mainstream critics, the album received an average score of 76, based on four reviews, which indicates "generally positive reviews". In a positive review for HipHopDX, Marcus Blackwell said: "Genre inconsistencies aside, Effected is a clear statement Cozz doesn’t just want to be the conversation with the best rappers. He wants to steer the debates." Writing for Exclaim!, Lidia Abraha commented saying, "Effected deserves props for its altruistic insight on the ups-and-downs of being an artist, and for Cozz's nuanced storytelling. There's room for improvement for the melodies and beats, even though the subtle instrumentals help amplify Cozz's voice and his champion storytelling." In Pitchfork's review of Effected, Jackson Howard writes Effected "is a confident step toward turning what used to be fantasy into cold, hard reality."

Respect. praised the album saying: "From beginning to end, Cozz expresses different relatable situations throughout manhood. Rather than speaking on matters of the heart, Cozz’ blunt attitude and straight forward sense of thinking gives off the perception of a player. Being one of the main artists on Dreamville‘s forefront, Cozz is sure to fill in the necessary gaps to land his solidified spot in the game." 2DOPEBOYZ called Cozz a "very talented rapper that is destined for a good spot in the rap game." They continued saying, "Adding more versatility into his formula for ultimate success could help gain the respect he strives to attain." XXL magazine praised Cozz' growth as a songwriter, they commented saying, "There's no denying that Cozz can rap his ass off—that much was confirmed after one play-through of his 2014 debut. Effected, however, confirms that Cozz has more in him than just straight bars. He continues to tell his own story but through new flows, different hooks and an advanced way of making rap songs."

== Track listing ==
Credits adapted from Tidal.

No.	Title	Writer(s)	Producer(s)	Length
1.	"Questions"	Cody Osagie; Marvin Coady	Soul Professa	2:25
2.	"Hustla's Story" (featuring Kendrick Lamar)	Osagie; Justin Bryant; Kendrick Duckworth; Frankie Beverly	Hollywood JB; Meez^{[b]}; Louie Ji^{[b]}	4:28
3.	"Ignorant Confidence"	Osagie; Michael Reddick; Kevin Mitchell; Joshua Morgan; Jiovanni Romano	Meez; Louie Ji; Mike Almighty^{[c]}; Chef Mitchell^{[c]}	2:51
4.	"Demons N Distractions"	Osagie; Morgan; Carl McCormick; Eliot Dubock; Dontae Winslow; Dave Foreman; Peter Milray	Meez; Cardiak; Beat Butcha^{[b]}; Winslow^{[b]}; Uncle Dave^{[b]}	5:11
5.	"Freaky 45"	Osagie; Anthony Parrino; Winslow; Arif Mardin	Elite; Winslow^{[b]}; Anthony Ware^{[b]}; Ron Gilmore^{[b]}	4:40
6.	"Proof"	Osagie; Chris Mayhew	D-Low Beats	2:42
7.	"Badu" (featuring Currensy)	Osagie; Morgan; Shante Franklin; Lamine Diop; Steve Kennedy; William Smith	Meez; Enimal	3:39
8.	"Bout It" (featuring Garren)	Osagie; Morgan; Garren Edwards	Meez	3:43
9.	"VanNess"	Osagie; Donte Perkins; Morgan	Tae Beast; Meez^{[b]}	2:35
10.	"Effected"	Osagie; Morgan	Meez	4:31
11.	"My Love"	Osagie; Morgan; Reddick; Wesley Dees; Elmer Bernstein	Meez; DJ Wes^{[b]}; Mike Almighty^{[b]}; Louie Ji^{[c]}	2:56
12.	"That's the Thing"	Osagie; Morgan; Winslow; Ann Hamilton; Dan Hamilton	Meez; Winslow^{[b]}	3:16
13.	"Zendaya" (featuring J. Cole)	Osagie; Jermaine Cole; Winslow; Ivan Lins; Vítor Martins	J. Cole; Winslow^{[b]}	4:18
14.	"Not a Minute More"	Osagie; Morgan; Foreman; L. Romano; Reddick; Mitchell; Sam Evans; Roxane Barker; Jacob Welsh; David Turay; Matt Knox; Geordan Reid-Campbell	Meez; Uncle Dave^{[b]}; Louie Ji^{[b]}; Mike Almighty^{[b]}; Chef Mitchell^{[b]}	3:28
Total length:				50:43

Notes

- ^{^[a]} signifies a co-producer
- ^{^[b]} signifies an additional producer
- ^{^[c]} signifies an uncredited co-producer

Sample credits

- "Hustla's Story" contains a sample from "Happy Feelings" performed by Maze, and written by Frankie Beverly.
- "Demons N Distractions" contains a sample from "Simple Life" written and performed by Peter Milray.
- "Freaky 45" contains a sample from "Love On A Rainy Afternoon" performed by Arif Mardin.
- "Proof" contains a sample from "Untitled" from the Private US Library 1976.
- "Badu" contains a sample from "Soft Shell" written by Steve Kennedy and William Smith and performed by Motherlode.
- "My Love" contains a sample from "To Kill A Mockingbird (Main Title)" performed by Elmer Bernstein.
- "That's The Thing" contains a sample from "Fallin' In Love", written by Ann Hamilton and Dan Hamilton, as performed by Hamilton, Joe Frank & Reynolds.
- "Zendaya" contains elements from "Abre Alas" performed by Ivan Lins.
- "Not a Minute More" contains a sample from "Lines", written by Sam Evans, Roxane Barker, Jacob Welsh, David Turay, Matt Knox and Geordan Reid-Campbell, as performed by The Hics.

== Personnel ==
Credits adapted from Tidal.

Performance

- Cozz – primary artist
- Kendrick Lamar – featured artist (track 2)
- Currensy – featured artist (track 7)
- Garren – featured artist (track 8)
- J. Cole – featured artist (track 13)

Production

- Rob Kinelski – mixer (all tracks)
- Soul Professa – producer (track 1)
- Hollywood JB – producer (track 2)
- Meez – additional producer (tracks 2, 9), producer (tracks 3, 4, 7, 8, 10-12, 14)
- Louie Ji – additional producer (tracks 2, 14), producer (track 3), uncredited co-producer (track 11)
- Chef Mitchell - uncredited co-producer (track 3), additional producer (track 14)
- Mike Almighty - uncredited co-producer (track 3), additional producer (tracks 3, 11)
- Cardiak – producer (track 4)
- Beat Butcha – additional producer (track 4)
- Dontae Winslow – additional producer (tracks 4, 5, 12, 13)
- Uncle Dave – additional producer (tracks 4, 14)
- Anthony Ware – additional producer (track 5)
- Ron Gilmore – additional producer (track 5)
- D-Low Beats – producer (track 6)
- Enimal – producer (track 7)
- Tae Beast – producer (track 9)
- DJ Wes – additional producer (track 11)
- J. Cole – producer (track 13)

== Charts ==
Chart (2018)	Peak position
US Top Heatseekers	18
