= Milky Way (album) =

Studio album by Bas
- Released: August 24, 2018
- Recorded: 2017–2018
- Studio: The Ox; The Sheltuh, Raleigh, NC
- Genre: Hip hop; afrobeats
- Length: 39:43
- Label: Dreamville; Interscope; The Fiends
- Producer: Abbas Hamad (also exec.); Jermaine Cole (also exec.); Ibrahim Hamad (exec.); Astro Raw; Cedric Brown; Childish Major; Christo; ClickNPress; Jay Kurzweil; KQuick; Muhamed Hamad; Meez; mOma+Guy; Ogee; Ron Gilmore; Sango; Tec Beatz

Bas chronology
Too High to Riot (2016)	Milky Way (2018)	We Only Talk About Real Shit When We're Fucked Up (2023)

Singles from Milky Way
- 1. "Boca Raton" Released: June 19, 2018; 2. "Tribe" Released: August 22, 2018

Milky Way is the third studio album by American rapper Bas. It was released on August 24, 2018, by Dreamville Records and Interscope Records. The album features guest appearances from J. Cole, Ari Lennox, ASAP Ferg and Correy C, with production handled by a variety of producers, including J. Cole, Ron Gilmore, Cedric Brown, Jay Kurzweil, Childish Major, Sango and Meez, among others.

The album was supported by two official singles: "Boca Raton" with ASAP Ferg and "Tribe" with J. Cole, and promotional single, "Pinball II" featuring Correy C. The album debuted at number 35 on the US Billboard 200, selling 13,150 album-equivalent units in the first week.

== Background ==
Bas addressed the release of Milky Way and the thought process behind it on Instagram saying:

It's been two and a half years since Too High to Riot. I've spent the better part searching for ground. We go looking for love in all the wrong places. We go on radio shows looking for love from the hosts and their audience. We put out albums, our truths, in hopes the public will love them and catapult us to great successes. We hope our labels will love how the singles perform. We conquer as many women as we can as if it'll make us love ourselves. Instead of finding one that who shows you the man you could be. We share only the good parts of our lives on social media. In hopes of making people fall in love with us. One like at a time. This album is about finding ground. About not poisoning your own well. About finding and tethering yourself to the love that truly fulfills you. Love of self. Love of others. Lovers. Family. Friends. Fans. You've all given me all the affirmation I'll ever need. That is the Milky Way. The only way to go.

== Promotion ==
Bas announced the Milky Way Tour on September 25, 2018 in support of the album. The tour will include 43 North American dates, starting in New Orleans, on November 16, 2018, and concluding in Nashville, Tennessee, on February 24, 2019.

=== Singles ===
On April 10, 2018, Bas released the promotional single "Pinball II" featuring Correy C, although not making it onto the album. The music video for "Pinball II" was released on June 5, 2018.

The album's first single "Boca Raton" with ASAP Ferg was released on June 19, 2018. The music video was released on August 9, 2018. On August 22, 2018, Bas released the second single "Tribe" with J. Cole, accompanied by a music video. The video was shot in Miami's Little Haiti neighborhood.

On February 29, 2019, the music video for "Purge" was released as the latest single of the album.

=== Other songs ===
The music video for the song, "Fragrance" featuring Correy C, was released on October 23, 2018.

== Critical reception ==
Professional ratings
Review scores
Source	Rating
DJBooth	(favorable)
HipHopDX	4.2/5
HotNewHipHop	82%
Medium	(favorable)

Upon its release, the album received critical acclaim. In a one listen review from hip hop website DJBooth, writer Yoh Phillips praised the album calling it a "unique sonic experience", he continued saying: "Milky Way is a body of work built for pure enjoyment. Music for a good time. Compared to his first two albums, Milky Way sounds specially crafted for return visits." Riley Wallace of HipHopDX gave the album a positive review saying, "Milky Way isn't a blatant attempt at killing the charts with sure-shot singles and will attract only a handful of new supporters with this approach. To its overall credit, however, it's a carefully curated collection of controlled experimentation that works as separate pieces and as a whole. If — like he suggests — he's giving New York City a "whole new sound," then the future sounds ... milky." Writing for Medium, Hamish Raman called the album "amazing", he commented saying: "I would recommend that everyone listen to it at least once especially if you want some music to vibe to. Dreamville is killing it at the moment, and it's got me hyped to see what's next."

Writing for HotNewHipHop, Richard Bryan said, "Milky Way is pretty much perfect vacation music. Soundtracks to laugh, and drink, and periodically, dance to. Despite the lack of weightiness to the work, Bas genuinely seems to be having fun experimenting with new styles and rhythms. Trey Alston of Revolt called the album "one of the most articulate, brilliant albums of the year", saying: "On Milky Way, Bas masters the art of versatility while remaining true to his lane.

== In other media ==
The track "Tribe" appeared on the soundtrack to 2018 video game FIFA 19.

== Track listing ==
Credits adapted from the album's liner notes.

No.	Title	Writer(s)	Producer(s)	Length
1.	"Icarus" (featuring Ari Lennox)	Abbas Hamad; Ron Gilmore; Josua Morgan; Jermaine Cole; Courtney Salter	Meez; Ron Gilmore; J. Cole^{[a]}	4:22
2.	"Front Desk"	Hamad; O. Oyebadejo; Cole; Gilmore	Jay Kurzweil; Cole^{[a]}; Gilmore^{[a]}	3:20
3.	"Tribe" (with J. Cole)	Hamad; Cole; M. Randle	Childish Major; Cole^{[a]}	3:58
4.	"Boca Raton" (with ASAP Ferg)	Hamad; K. Wright; Cedric Brown; D. Ferguson Jr.; Cole	Sango; Cole^{[a]}; Cedric "Ced" Brown^{[a]}	3:17
5.	"Barack Obama Special"	Hamad	Gilmore; ClickNPress^{[a]}	3:07
6.	"Purge"	Hamad; M. Soto; Gilmore; K. Rollins; Fats Waller; Andy Razaf	Gilmore; Christo; Cole^{[a]}	3:06
7.	"Fragrance" (featuring Correy C)	Hamad; Brandon Sewell; Brown; Correy Christopher Chatham; Jordan Rakei; Cole; J. Morgan; Vincent Fenton; Gilmore	Brown; Cole^{[a]}; Gilmore^{[a]}; Tec Beatz^{[a]}; Meez^{[a]}	3:37
8.	"Infinity"			0:20
9.	"Infinity+2" (featuring Correy C)	Hamad; O. Oyebadejo; Cole; Ryan Olson; Channy Leaneagh	Jay Kurzweil	1:54
10.	"Sanufa"	Hamad; Cole; Gilmore	Cole; Gilmore^{[a]}	2:45
11.	"Great Ones"			0:35
12.	"PDA"	Hamad; Gabir; Rodney Franklin; Devonté Hynes; K. Rollins; Gilmore; Adam Bainbridge; O. Oyebadejo; B. Sewel	Ogee; KQuick^{[a]}; Kurzweil^{[a]}; Tec Beatz^{[a]}; Gilmore^{[a]}	2:58
13.	"Designer"	Hamad; John Welch; Brown; Rollins; Gilmore; Tom Misch	Brown; Cole^{[a]}; Christo^{[a]}; KQuick^{[a]}; Gilmore^{[a]}; Bas^{[a]}; Muhamed Hamad^{[a]}	2:53
14.	"Spaceships + Rockets" (featuring LION BABE, Moe Moks & mOma+Guy) (Bonus Track)	Hamad; Moses Mokuolou; Dominic "Mocky" Salole; Jillian Hervey; Lucas Goodman	Astro Raw; mOma+Guy	3:31
Total length:				39:43

Notes

- ^{^[a]} signifies an additional producer
- "Barack Obama Special" feature additional vocals by Kaleb Rollins
- "Purge" feature additional vocals by Sam Evans
- "Fragrance" feature additional vocals by Cozz
- "Sanufa" and "Designer" features additional vocals by Rox Barker

Sample credits

- "Tribe" contains a sample of "Zum Zum" performed by Edu Lobo.
- "Boca Raton" contains excerpts from "Peace Go With You, Brother", written and performed by Gil Scott-Heron and Brian Jackson.
- "Barack Obama Special" contains elements of "Honeysuckle Rose", written by Fats Waller and Andy Razaf, as performed by Oscar Peterson.
- "Purge" contains experts from "The Show", written and performed by Michael Noyce.
- "Fragrance" contains excerpts from "Learn To Fly", written and performed by Vincent Fenton and Jordan Rakei.
- "Infinity" contains excerpts from the film, White Men Can't Jump (1992), performed by Woody Harrelson and Rosie Perez, courtesy of 20th Century Fox.
- "Infinity+2" contains excerpts from "Lay Your Cards Out", written by Ryan Olson and Channy Leaneagh, as performed by Gayngs.
- "Great Ones" contains excerpts from the film, A Bronx Tale (1993), performed by Chazz Palminteri, courtesy of Universal Pictures.
- "PDA" contains elements of "Thank You", written and performed by Devonté Hynes, Adam Bainbridge and Rodney Franklin, and "Song For You", written and performed by Rodney Franklin.
- "Designer" contains a sample of "Come Back" written and performed by Tom Misch.
- "Spaceships + Rockets" contains elements of "Music To My Ears", written and performed by Dominic "Mocky" Salole and the South African hit Gqom Song "Wololo" by Babes Wodumo and Mampintsha as featured in the hit Marvel Studios film Black Panther.

== Personnel ==
Credits adapted from official liner notes.

Technical

- Derek "MixedByAli" Ali − mixing (all tracks)
- Aria Angel − mixing (all tracks)
- Cyrus "NOIS" Taghipour − assistant mixing (all tracks)
- Glenn Schick − mastering (all tracks)

== Charts ==
Chart (2018)	Peak position
Belgian Albums (Ultratop Flanders)	180
Canadian Albums (Billboard)	65
Dutch Albums (Album Top 100)	109
US Billboard 200	35
US Top R&B/Hip-Hop Albums (Billboard)	19
