= Liability =

Liability refers to the following:

== Law ==
- Legal liability, in both civil and criminal law
  - Public liability, part of the law of tort which focuses on civil wrongs
  - Product liability, the area of law in which manufacturers, distributors, suppliers, retailers, and others who make products available to the public are held responsible for the injuries those products cause
  - Professional liability for one's professional acts, as in professional liability insurance
  - Corporate liability

== Finance ==
- Liability (accounting) a current obligation of an entity arising from past transactions or events
  - Accrued liabilities and contingent liability
  - Current liability, or short-term liabilities are obligations that will be settled by current assets or by the creation of new current liabilities
  - Non-current, or Long-term liabilities, liabilities with a future benefit over a certain period of time (e.g. longer than one year)

== Arts and media ==
=== Film ===
- The Liability, a 2013 film

=== Music ===
- Liability (album), a 2015 album by Prof
- "Liability" (song), a song by Lorde from the 2017 album Melodrama
- "Liability", a song by Carly Pearce from the 2021 album 29: Written in Stone
- "Liability", a song by Drake from the 2022 album Honestly, Nevermind
- "Liability", a song by Fufanu from the 2017 album Sports
- "Liability", a song by Raleigh Ritchie from the 2016 EP Mind the Gap
- "Liability", a song by The Juliana Theory from the 2001 EP Music from Another Room
