= Nothin Personal =

Mixtape by Cozz
- Released: January 4, 2016
- Recorded: 2015
- Genre: Hip hop
- Length: 47:36
- Label: Dreamville; Tha Committee
- Producer: Meez; Mike Almighty; D2; T. Lew

Cozz chronology
Cozz & Effect (2014)	Nothin Personal (2016)	Effected (2018)

Singles from Nothin Personal
- 1. "Tabs" Released: December 9, 2015; 2. "Growth" Released: December 9, 2015; 3. "My Side" Released: December 31, 2015; 4. "Who Said" Released: January 3, 2016

Nothin Personal is the debut mixtape by American rapper Cozz and was released on January 4, 2016 by Dreamville Records and Tha Committee Records.

== Background ==
The mixtape includes features from label-mate Bas, as well as Boogie, Correy C, and Free Akrite. The production of this mixtape is mostly handled by Meez, but includes guest producers from D2, T. Lew, and Mike Almighty.

== Singles ==
On December 8, 2015, Cozz announced the mixtape while releasing two new songs which appeared on the Dreamville compilation album, Revenge of the Dreamers II, "Tabs" and "Grow". On December 31, Cozz announced the release date of the mixtape along with releasing "My Side" on the same day. A day before the mixtape's release, Cozz shared another single, titled "Who Said", on January 3, 2016. On February 25, he released the official music video for "Tabs" featuring Bas. On May 27, the single "My Side" was made available to Spotify with the official music video being released on May 31.

== Critical reception ==
Professional ratings
Review scores
Source	Rating
HipHopDX	3/5 stars
Pitchfork	6.9/10

Upon its release, Nothin Personal received generally positive reviews from critics. Scott Glaysher of HipHopDX rated the mixtape 3 out 5 saying, "[it's] pretty clear that Cozz considers himself underrated amongst his rap peers, as he mentions that idea frequently" and "[only] a year removed from that solo debut, Cozz still has a lot of time to show and prove. Nothin Personal isn’t exactly perfection or an obvious contender for “2016 project of the year,” but it’s good enough to keep us from writing Cozz off, for now." Paul A. Thompson of Pitchfork Media gave the mixtape a 6.9 out of 10 saying "His new offering, Nothin Personal, is a low-concept stroll through the Crip-controlled blocks of Cozz’s youth."

== Track listing ==
No.	Title	Writer(s)	Producer(s)	Length
1.	"Wake Up Call"	Cody Osagie	Meez	3:05
2.	"All Eyez On Me"	Osagie	Meez	3:58
3.	"My Side"	Osagie	Meez; D2	2:22
4.	"Grey Goose"	Osagie	Meez; T. Lew	3:50
5.	"City of God" (featuring Boogie)	Osagie; Anthony Dixson	Meez	3:21
6.	"Choice Today"	Osagie	Meez	3:38
7.	"Grow" (featuring Correy C)	Osagie	Meez	4:17
8.	"Who Said"	Osagie	Meez	4:10
9.	"Tabs" (featuring Bas)	Osagie; Abbas Hamad	Meez	3:46
10.	"Tell Me"	Osagie	Meez	4:12
11.	"GWBW (All Good)"	Osagie	Meez	3:02
12.	"Bonnie and Clyde" (featuring Free Akrite)	Osagie	Meez; Mike Almighty	3:55
13.	"Guinness"	Osagie	Meez; Mike Almighty	4:00
Total length:				47:36
