= Tribe (Bas and J. Cole song) =

Single by Bas with J. Cole

from the album Milky Way
- Released: August 22, 2018
- Recorded: 2018
- Genre: Hip hop
- Length: 3:58
- Label: Dreamville; Interscope
- Songwriters: Abbas Hamad; Jermaine Cole; Markus Randle
- Producers: Childish Major; J. Cole

Bas singles chronology
| "Boca Raton" (2018) | "Tribe" (2018) | "Down Bad" (2019) |

J. Cole singles chronology
| "Album of the Year (Freestyle)" (2018) | "Tribe" (2018) | "Pretty Little Fears" (2018) |

Music video
- Bas – Tribe with J. Cole on YouTube

"Tribe" is a song by American rappers Bas and J. Cole. It was released on August 22, 2018, as the second single for Bas's album Milky Way. The song was produced by Childish Major with additional production from J. Cole, and contains a sample of "Zum Zum" performed by Edu Lobo.

== Background ==
On August 18, Bas was on Instagram live previewing songs from his album, which was due on August 24. One of the snippets was from "Tribe" showcasing "an up-tempo, percussive instrumental," and later revealing the release date of the single. The song is the ninth collaboration between the two Dreamville artists, including "My Nigga Just Made Bail", "Lit" and "Night Job", among others. When talking about J. Cole helping with the post-production of the song, Bas said:

I learned a lot with this project just you know, really taking the time leaving no stone unturned. Especially nowadays, people are conditioned to hear things a certain way like trap drums are so popular. So it's like adding some hi-hats and switching the snare there, and throwing the 808 is going to make the difference some kid connecting or not connecting with it.

== Music video ==
The music video for the song was released on August 21. The video was shot in Miami's Little Haiti neighborhood. Sidney Madden of NPR said, "like the song's message, the video celebrates the timing of life's blessings."

== In other media ==
The song "Tribe" was featured on the soundtrack to 2018 video game FIFA 19.

== Charts ==
| Chart (2018) | Peak position |
|---|---|
| New Zealand Hot Singles (RMNZ) | 6 |
| US Bubbling Under Hot 100 (Billboard) | 8 |
| US Hot R&B/Hip-Hop Songs (Billboard) | 48 |

== Certifications ==
| Region | Certification | Certified units/sales |
|---|---|---|
| United Kingdom (BPI) | Silver | 200,000^{‡} |
| United States (RIAA) | Platinum | 1,000,000^{‡} |
^{‡} Sales+streaming figures based on certification alone.
