= Powderhorn Suites =

Studio album by Prof
- Released: November 13, 2020
- Genre: Hip-hop
- Length: 54:06
- Label: Stophouse Music Group

Prof chronology
Pookie Baby (2018)	Powderhorn Suites (2020)	Horse (2023)

Powderhorn Suites is the fifth solo studio album by American rapper Prof. It was released on November 13, 2020. The album was due out June 26, 2020, but Prof was dropped from his label shortly before the release date. He went on to self-release it through his Stophouse Music Group label. Powderhorn refers to the South Minneapolis neighborhood where Prof grew up.

On April 29, 2020, Prof released his first single, "Squad Goals", from his newly announced album Powderhorn Suites that was due to be released on June 26, 2020 on Rhymesayers Entertainment The video for "Squad Goals" features Prof as a drug-depraved Mister Rodgers. It has over 12 million views on YouTube.

However, on June 25, Rhymesayers dropped Prof from their label, stating that they "failed to not only vet the signing of Prof but also calling into question the intentions behind his music, messaging and content more strongly". Rhymesayers further intended to cease the release of Powderhorn Suites to the extent that they could, given the imminent release date.

On October 22, 2020, Prof announced the re-release of Powderhorn Suites by his Stophouse Music Group record label and premiered a music video for the song "Animal Patrol" from the album. Powderhorn Suites was released by Stophouse Music Group on November 13, 2020. Prof premiered a music video for the song "Outside Baby" the same day of the album's release. On November 20, 2020, Powderhorn Suites peaked at 36 on the Billboard 200.

== Track listing ==
No.	Title	Length
1.	"Check In"	0:29
2.	"Squad Goals"	3:20
3.	"Animal Patrol"	2:39
4.	"Fire Lessons"	3:18
5.	"Cousins" (featuring Cashinova)	3:50
6.	"Geronimo"	3:05
7.	"Butterfly Knife"	3:16
8.	"Numbers" (featuring Muja Messiah & Taylor J)	3:19
9.	"Dead Man Shuffle"	2:35
10.	"Outside Baby"	4:35
11.	"Perfume"	4:23
12.	"Ain't We Rich"	4:21
13.	"Flower Boy"	4:54
14.	"The Ending"	2:42
15.	"Spellbound (The Beginning)"	3:16
16.	"Karma Legend"	4:04
Total length:		54:06

== Charts ==
Chart (2020)	Peak position
US Billboard 200	36
