= Last Winter =

Studio album by Bas
- Released: April 29, 2014
- Recorded: 2013–14
- Genre: Hip hop
- Length: 40:02
- Label: Dreamville; Interscope
- Producer: J. Cole (exec.); Cedric Brown; Ron Gilmore; GP808; Hottrak; Jay Kurzweil; Ogee Handz

Bas chronology
Quarter Water Raised Me Vol. 2 (2013)	Last Winter (2014)	Too High to Riot (2016)

Last Winter is the debut studio album by American rapper Bas. It was released on April 29, 2014, by Dreamville Records, and Interscope Records. The album debuted at No. 103 on Billboard 200, selling 3,601 copies in its first week. It has sold 11,000 copies in the US as of February 2016.

== Background ==
The album features guest appearances from his label-mates J. Cole, and KQuick, along with artists contributing this album such as Irvin Washington, and Mack Wilds. The production on this album includes from Cedric Brown, Ron Gilmore, GP808, Hottrak, Jay Kurzweil, and Ogee Handz, among others.

== Singles and promotion ==
On May 2, Bas released the music video for "My Nigga Just Made Bail" featuring J. Cole. The song "Lit" appeared on his mixtape in 2013, and a music video for that was released on July 11, followed by a video for "Charles De Gaulle to JFK".

== Track listing ==
Credits adapted from ASCAP.

No.	Title	Writer(s)	Producer(s)	Length
1.	"New World Order"	Abbas Hamad; Ronald Gilmore; Derick Okolie; Georgia Anne Muldrow	Gilmore	3:50
2.	"Mook in New Mexico"	Hamad; Gilmore; Ali Gabir Oussama	Ogee Handz; Gilmore^{[a]}	3:17
3.	"Fiji Water In My Iron" (featuring KQuick)	Hamad; Gilmore; Oussama; Kaleb Rollins	Ogee Handz; Gilmore^{[a]}	3:29
4.	"My Nigga Just Made Bail" (featuring J. Cole)	Hamad; Jermaine Cole; Gilmore; Wala Longanga; Yala Asebaluka; Harrys Likongo	GP808; Hottrak; Gilmore	3:36
5.	"Charles De Gaulle to JFK"	Hamad; Gilmore	Gilmore	3:09
6.	"Vacation" (featuring Irvin Washington)	Hamad; Irvin Washington; Gilmore; Rollins; Adam Wiles	Gilmore	3:28
7.	"Building Blocks (Interlude)"	Hamad; Jay Kurzweil	Jay Kurzweil	1:35
8.	"Donk of the Day"	Hamad; Gilmore; Cedric Brown; Eddie Holland; Michael Smith	Brown; Gilmore	4:48
9.	"Golden Goals"	Hamad; Kurzweil; Michael Avant; Stephen Huff; Chris Kelly; Eric Thompson	Kurzweil	2:34
10.	"Nigga on the Dos, The Most Interesting Man in the World"	Hamad; Gilmore; Yolanda DeBerry; T.S. Rose Desandies; Yann Fabroni	Jii Amadehuss; Gilmore	3:28
11.	"Your World" (featuring Mack Wilds)	Hamad; Gilmore; Oussama; Rollins	Ogee Handz; Gilmore^{[a]}	3:00
12.	"Last Winter"	Hamad; Brown; Gilmore; Frank Alstin; Charles Simmons	Brown; Gilmore	3:12
Total length:				40:02

iTunes Store bonus tracks
No.	Title	Writer(s)	Producer(s)	Length
13.	"Lit" (featuring J. Cole & KQuick)	Hamad; Cole; Brown; Gilmore; Rollins; Arden Altino; Jerry Duplessis; Miguel Pimentel; Paul Pesco	Brown; Gilmore	4:38
Total length:				44:40

Sample Credits

- "New World Order" contains a sample of "Demise" written and performed by Georgia Anne Muldrow.
- "Vacation" contains a sample of "Flashback" written by Adam Wiles and performed by Calvin Harris.
- "Donk of the Day" contains a sample of "You Are the Heart of Me" written by Eddie Holland and Michael Smith and performed by The Supremes.
- "Golden Goals" contains a sample of "This Time" written by Myron Avant, Stephen Huff, Chris Kelly and Eric Payton and performed by Avant.
- "Last Winter" contains a sample of "Who Can I Run To?" written by Frank Alstin and Charles Simmons and performed by The Jones Girls.
- "Lit" contains a sample of "Do You..." written by Miguel Pimantel, Arden Altino, Jerry Duplessis and Paul Pesco and performed by Miguel.

Notes

^{[a]} indicated a co-producer.

== Charts ==
Chart (2015)	Peak position
US Billboard 200	103
US Top R&B/Hip-Hop Albums (Billboard)	18
US Rap Albums (Billboard)	13
