= Too High to Riot =

2016 studio album by Bas

Studio album by Bas
- Released: March 4, 2016
- Recorded: 2014–2015; New York City, Los Angeles, London
- Genre: Hip hop
- Length: 36:56
- Labels: Dreamville; Interscope
- Producers: J. Cole (exec.); Ibrahim Hamad (exec.); Ron Gilmore (exec.); Ogee Handz + DikC; Cedric Brown; Cam O’bi; Soundwave; Subdaio; The Hics; K-Quick; Jay Kurzweil

Bas chronology
Last Winter (2014)	Too High to Riot (2016)	Milky Way (2018)

Singles from Too High to Riot
- 1. "Night Job" Released: December 4, 2015; 2. "Housewives" Released: December 11, 2015; 3. "Methylone" Released: February 5, 2016

Too High to Riot is the second studio album by Sudanese rapper Bas. It was released on March 4, 2016, by Dreamville Records and Interscope Records. The album sold 8,065 copies in its first week, debuting at number 49 on the Billboard 200 chart.

== Background ==
The album includes the guest appearances from his labelmates J. Cole and Cozz, along with The Hics. The sonic foundation of the album is produced by Ron Gilmore, Ogee Handz + DikC, Cedric Brown, Cam O’bi, Sounwave, Subdaio, The Hics, and K-Quick.

== Promotion ==
On April 15, 2016, Bas announced Too High To Riot Tour with Cozz, EarthGang, The Hics and Ron Gilmore. The tour started June 3, 2016 in Miami, Florida and ended July 17, 2016 in New York City. The tour was 26 dates. On January 30, 2017 Bas released Too High to Riot documentary on Tidal. The documentary was available exclusively to Tidal subscribers for the first few days, it was uploaded to YouTube on February 4, 2017. The documentary follows Bas on his Too High to Riot tour.

== Singles ==
On December 4, 2015, Bas released the first single from this album, titled "Night Job" featuring J. Cole. The music video for "Night Job was released on March 3, 2016. On December 11, 2015, which is a week later, he released the second single, titled "Housewives". This track, also was included on the Dreamville's compilation album, titled Revenge of the Dreamers II. On July 15, 2016, Bas released "Housewives (Remix)" featuring rapper Ab-Soul. On February 5, 2016, the album's third single was released for the song, titled "Methylone". On the same day, Bas announced the release date, track list, and cover art of the album.

== Critical reception ==
Professional ratings
Review scores
Source	Rating
HipHopDX	4/5 stars
Exclaim!	7/10
XXL	(XL)

Upon its release, Too High to Riot received acclaim from critics. Scott Glaysher of HipHopDX rated the album a 3.9 out 5 saying, "Too High to Riot is hands-down Bas’ best work to date. It’s a smooth yet potent project with few stumbles minus the rhyme variation. It mixes all of his strengths into one cohesive package and demands to be played again and again. With only four real concrete years in the game, this latest installment to his catalog is the foundation he needs to potentially become Michael Jordan himself; or at least Steph Curry." Writing for Exclaim!, Themistoklis Alexis praised the rapper for "a maturity that never preaches — something that many of his peers generally don't reach until a handful of albums in." In a positive review for The Arkansas Traveler, Brittany Williams said, "Whether Bas is too high to riot because of indulging in cannabis or because of his new found status in hip-hop is hard to determine, but the rapper’s writing skills, melodic rhyme scheme and overall relatability are hard to ignore."

== Track listing ==
Credits adapted from ASCAP.

No.	Title	Writer(s)	Producer(s)	Length
1.	"Too High to Riot"	Abbas Hamad; Cameron Osteen; Ron Gilmore	Cam O'Bi; Gilmore^{[a]}	2:42
2.	"Methylone"	Hamad; Gilmore; Kaleb Rollins	Gilmore	2:42
3.	"Dopamine" (featuring Cozz)	Hamad; Cody Osagie; Brown; Cole; Gilmore; Piero Piccioni	Gilmore; Cedric Brown^{[a]}	3:36
4.	"Housewives"	A.Hamad; Gilmore; David Medina; Ibrahim Hamad; Alex Tapia	Sounwave; Gilmore^{[a]}	3:30
5.	"Miles and Miles"	Hamad; Gilmore	Gilmore	1:39
6.	"Live For"	Hamad; Sedik Boudif; Gilmore; Ali Gabir Oussama; Alex Isley	Ogee Handz; DikC	2:42
7.	"Clouds Never Get Old"	Hamad; Boudif; Gilmore; Jay Kurzweil; Rollins; Oussama; Melissa Elliott; Timothy Mosley	Ogee Handz; DikC; Jay Kurzweil^{[a]}	3:08
8.	"Matches" (featuring The Hics)	Hamad; Gilmore; Rollins; Roxane Dayette; Sam Evans	Gilmore	3:44
9.	"Night Job" (featuring J. Cole)	Hamad; Jermaine Cole; Brown; Samuel Dutertre; Henry Laufer; Gilmore; Rollins	Cedric Brown; KQuick; Gilmore^{[a]}	3:14
10.	"Ricochet" (featuring The Hics)	Hamad; Gilmore; Geordan Reid-Campbell; Dayette; Evans; Jacob Welsh	The Hics; Gilmore; Kurzweil^{[a]}	3:16
11.	"Penthouse"	Hamad; Gilmore; Derick Okolie; Rollins; Tiffany Calver; Michael Parvizi; Paul Sledge; Preston Walker	Gilmore	4:01
12.	"Black Owned Business"	Hamad; Gilmore; Rollins; Otis Jackson, Jr.; Bhanu Rangra; Daniel Thompson	Subdaio	2:42
Total length:				36:56

Notes

- ^{[a]} indicates an additional producer.
- "Clouds Never Get Old" features background vocals from Ella Mai.

Sample Credits

- "Dopamine" contains a sample of "Camille 2000 (Titles)" composed by Piero Piccioni, taken from the soundtrack to the film Camille 2000.
- "Live For" contains a sample of "Don't Do" written and performed by Alex Isley.
- "Clouds Never Get Old" contains a sample of "Never Comin' Back" written by Melissa Elliott and Timothy Mosley and performed by Aaliyah.
- "Night Job" contains a sample of "No More" written and performed by Jeremih and Shlohmo
- "Penthouse" contains a sample of "Can't See Lovely (Lately)" written by Michael Parvizi, Paul Sledge and Preston Walker and performed by Penthouse Penthouse and PromNite.
- "Black Owned Business" contains a sample of "Experience" written by Otis Jackson, Jr., Bhanu Rangra and Daniel Thompson and performed by Daedelus.

== Charts ==
Chart (2015)	Peak position
US Billboard 200	49
US Top R&B/Hip-Hop Albums (Billboard)	7
US Rap Albums (Billboard)	6
