= Prof (rapper) =

American rapper and singer (born 1984)

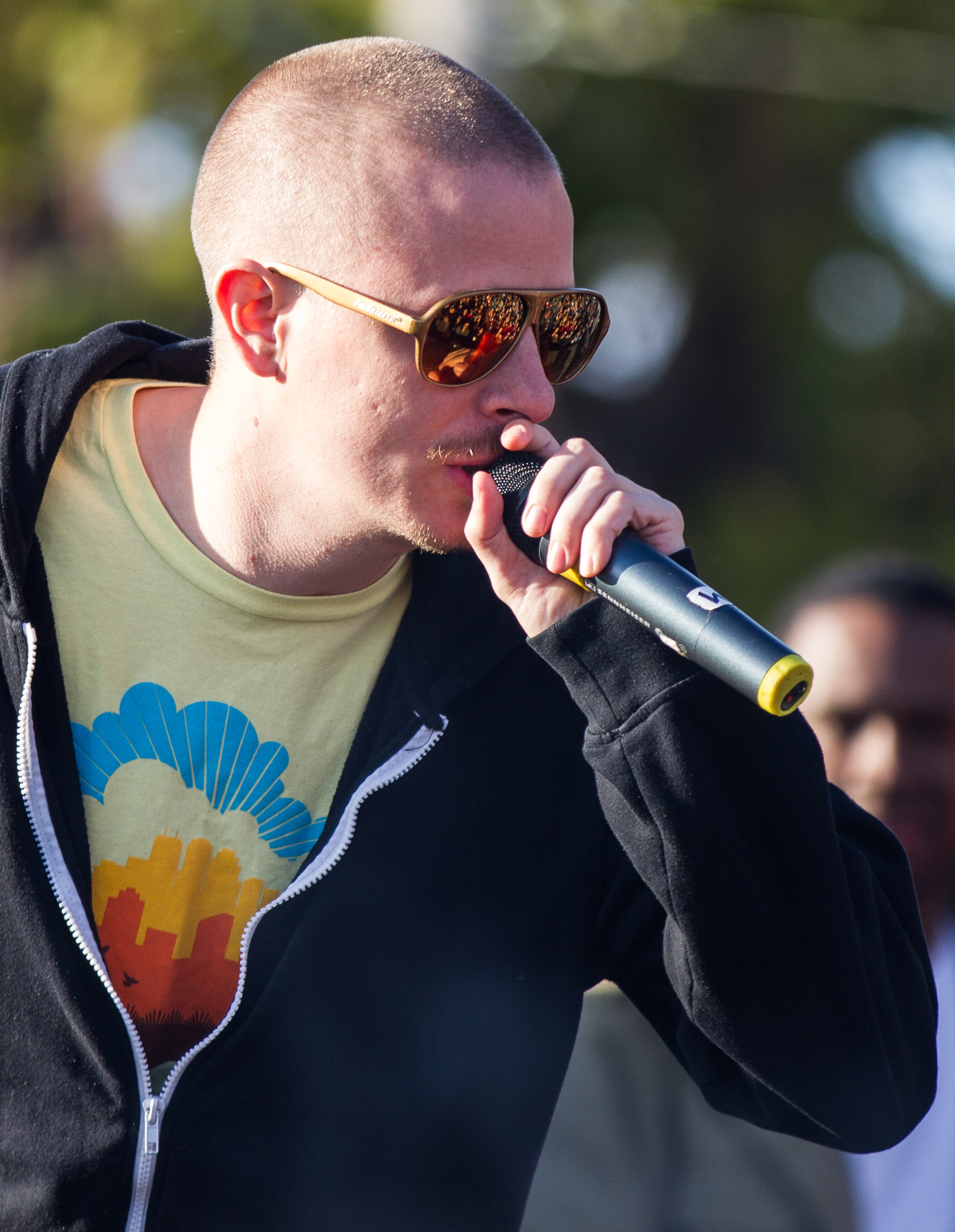
- Prof performing at 2012 "Day of Dignity" at Masjid An-Nur mosque in Minneapolis

Background information
- Born: Jacob Lukas Anderson; April 29, 1984 (age 42); Minneapolis, Minnesota, U.S.
- Genres: Hip-hop; Alternative hip-hop; Comedy hip-hop
- Occupations: Rapper; singer; songwriter; record producer
- Years active: 2000–present
- Labels: Stophouse Music Group; Rhymesayers Entertainment
- Website: https://www.profgampo.com

Signature
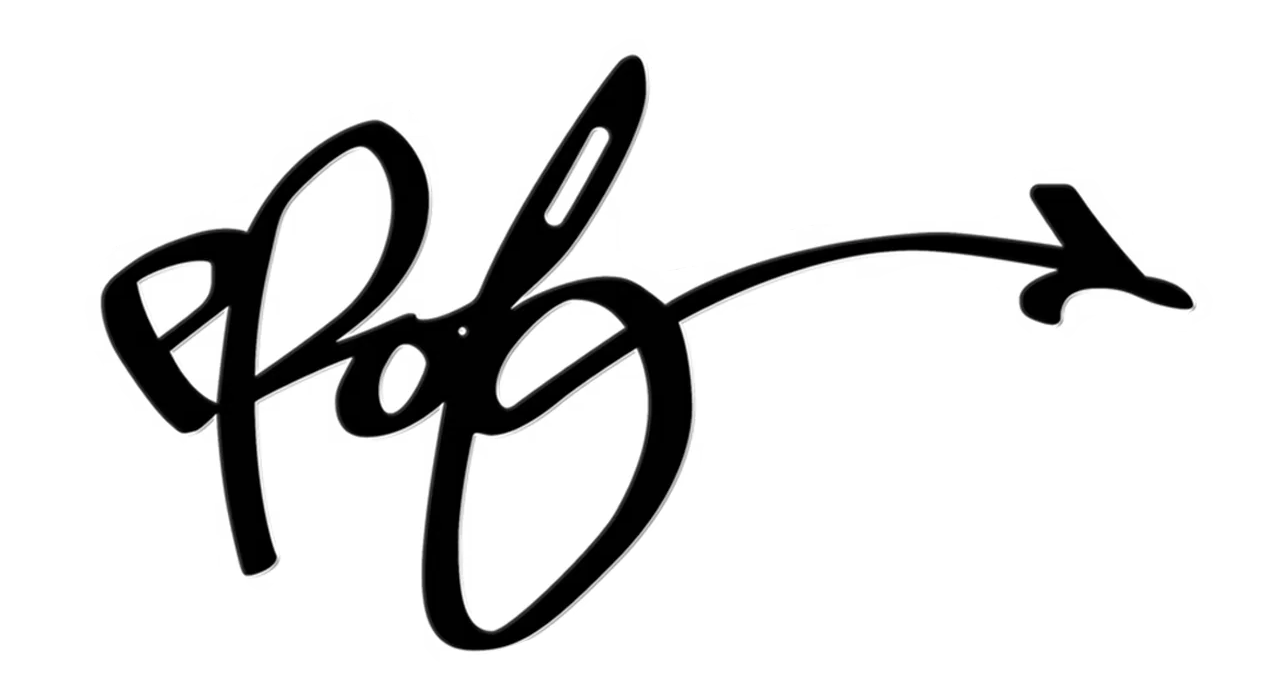

Jacob Lukas Anderson (born April 29, 1984), better known by his stage name Prof, is an American rapper, singer, and record producer based in Minneapolis, Minnesota. He released his first full-length album, Project Gampo, in 2007 and has since released six additional albums and three EPs. In 2012, City Pages named Prof on their list of Minnesota's 20 best rappers. He was formerly signed to Rhymesayers Entertainment.

== Early life ==
Jacob "Jake" Anderson grew up in the Powderhorn neighborhood of Minneapolis, an area that would later be referenced in his musical works. His mother, Colleen, had a rocky relationship with his father, who suffered from bipolar disorder and was physically abusive. She would later divorce Anderson's father and move away, taking Anderson's three older sisters with her.

During his formative years, Anderson developed a "comedic, dirty-mouthed rap persona" that he named "Gampo," after a childhood friend. Anderson graduated from Minneapolis South High School in 2002.

== Career ==
Prior to achieving broader recognition, Prof cultivated a substantial local following through consistent independent music releases and energetic live performances. In the mid-2000s, he frequently performed at the Dinkytowner bar alongside his partner and hype man, Rahzwell. It was a period crucial for refining his performance skills and establishing a direct connection with audiences.

It was during this time that he met Mike Campbell, who would become his manager. Together with Dillon Parker, Anderson and Campbell co-founded Stophouse Music Group, an independent record label and studio based in northeast Minneapolis that would serve as Prof's primary creative and distribution platform for much of his career. Through Stophouse, Prof released early projects, including the 2006 collaborative album Absolutely with Rahzwell, followed by his first solo album, Project Gampo, in 2007. Other independent works from this period include 2009's Recession Music with St. Paul Slim, 2011's King Gampo (2011), and the Kaiser Von Powderhorn EP series (2008, 2010, 2012), which further solidified his local reputation.

His growing prominence in the local scene was formally acknowledged in 2012 when City Pages included him among Minnesota's top 20 rappers, noting his musical versatility, vocal ability, and capacity to engage audiences. Conversely, musician and critic Dwight Hobbes of the Twin Cities Daily Planet asserted that Prof's 2011 album, King Gampo, was "asinine, narcissistic self-indulgence run completely riot, without a shred of redeeming artistry" and "rap at its worst".

=== Rhymesayers ===
The success of his independent endeavors eventually drew the attention of Rhymesayers Entertainment, a prominent independent hip-hop label known for artists such as Atmosphere. In 2010, Prof was part of Rhymesayers' "Welcome to Minnesota" tour.

Prof signed with Rhymesayers on December 3, 2013, representing a pivotal moment in his career—providing him with a larger platform while allowing him to maintain creative control. The announcement, which coincided with the release of his single "The Reply," signaled increased national attention for his work.

In May 2015, Prof announced his debut record on Rhymesayers, entitled Liability. Prof released a single called "Ghost" from the album. Liability was released October 16, 2015, and peaked at 141 on the Billboard 200 chart November 7, 2015.

On February 20, 2018, Prof announced he would be releasing a new album, titled Pookie Baby, on April 13, 2018. The themes within Pookie Baby reflected a new perspective influenced by injuries sustained from extensive touring, leading to a more nuanced sound. On September 6, 2019, Prof premiered a music video for his song titled "Cousins" featuring Saint Paul, Minnesota rapper, Cashinova.

On April 29, 2020, Prof released his first single, "Squad Goals", from his newly announced album Powderhorn Suites that was due to be released on June 26.

However, on June 25, 2020, Rhymesayers dropped Prof from their label, stating that they "failed to not only vet the signing of Prof but also calling into question the intentions behind his music, messaging, and content more strongly". The label's statement specifically referenced "misogynistic lyrics and social media posts" and "accusations of sexual misconduct" as factors in their decision. Rhymesayers further intended to cease the release of Powderhorn Suites to the extent that they could given the imminent release date.

This event generated considerable discussion within the hip-hop community. Prof publicly addressed the situation in subsequent interviews and through his music, acknowledging past behaviors, expressing remorse, and indicating a commitment to personal growth and accountability.

=== Independent again ===
On October 22, 2020, Prof announced the re-release of Powderhorn Suites by his Stophouse Music Group record label and premiered a music video for the song "Animal Patrol" from the album. Powderhorn Suites was released by Stophouse Music Group on November 13, 2020. Prof premiered a music video for his Powderhorn Suites song "Outside Baby" the same day of the album's release. On November 20, 2020, Powderhorn Suites peaked at 36 on the Billboard 200, marking a significant achievement for an independent artist.

Horse, was released via Stophouse Music Group on April 14, 2023, and achieved notable independent chart success, ranking as the #2 Current Rap Album, #1 Heatseekers Album, #1 Emerging Artist Album, #8 Top Billboard Album, and #17 Independent Album on the Billboard charts. Horse includes collaborations with artists such as Method Man, Kevin Gates, and Redman.

Prof's most recent album Good Time Boy was released via Stophouse on June 26, 2026. The album includes collaborations with T pain, E-40, 2 Chainz, UK rap duo Pete & Bas, Texas-based rappers That Mexican OT and Sauce Walka, and Minneapolis-based hip-hop artist JonRay.

== Live performances ==
Prof performing at the Armory with the Blugold Marching Band Drumline in 2026

In May 2013, he performed as a last-minute substitute for Busta Rhymes at the Soundset Music Festival with only an hour's notice. Prof has been one of the few Minneapolis rap acts (in addition to Doomtree and several Rhymesayers artists) who are capable of selling out the city's famed First Avenue Mainroom, and the only to do so without the backing of Minnesota Public Radio station 89.3 The Current.

In 2015, to further enhance his touring capabilities, Prof secured the representation of William Morris.

== Personal life ==
Prof has a daughter.

== Discography ==
=== Studio albums ===
List of studio albums, with selected details and chart positions
Title	Album details	Peak chart positions
Title	Album details	US
Absolutely (with Rahzwell)	Released: 2006; Label: Stophouse Music Group; Formats: Digital download, CD	—
Project Gampo	Released: 2007; Label: Stophouse Music Group; Formats: Digital download, CD	—
Recession Music (with St. Paul Slim)	Released: 2009; Label: Stophouse Music Group; Formats: Digital download, CD	—
King Gampo	Released: 2011; Label: Stophouse Music Group; Formats: Digital download, CD	—
Liability	Released: 2015; Label: Rhymesayers; Formats: Digital download, CD	141
Pookie Baby	Released: 2018; Label: Rhymesayers; Formats: Digital download, CD, LP	—
Powderhorn Suites	Released: 2020; Label: Stophouse Music Group; Formats: Digital download, CD, LP	36
Horse	Released: 2023; Label: Stophouse Music Group; Formats: Digital download, CD, LP	111
Good Time Boy	Released: 2026; Label: Stophouse Music Group; Formats: Digital download, CD, LP	—

=== Extended plays ===
Title	EP details
Prof/Ra EP	Released: 2005; Label: Self-released; Formats: CD
Kaiser Von Powderhorn	Released: 2008; Label: Stophouse Music Group; Formats: CD
Kaiser Von Powderhorn 2	Released: 2010; Label: Stophouse Music Group; Formats: CD
Kaiser Von Powderhorn 3	Released: 2012; Label: Stophouse Music Group; Formats: Digital download, CD

=== Live albums ===
Title	Album details
Live from Powderhorn Suites	Released: 2021; Label: Stophouse Music Group; Formats: CD

=== Singles ===
Year	Title	Album/EP
2007	"Rocket Man"	Project Gampo
2010	"Animal"	Kaiser Von Powderhorn 2
2011	"Gampo"	King Gampo
2011	"Peep Show"	King Gampo
2011	"Need Your Love"	King Gampo
2011	"Myself"	King Gampo
2012	"Me Boi"	Kaiser Von Powderhorn 3
2012	"Moron"	Kaiser Von Powderhorn 3
2012	"Super Scary Monster" (with Grieves)	Non-album singles
2013	"Zoo"	Non-album singles
2013	"The Reply"	Non-album singles
2014	"Farout"	Liability
2015	"Ghost" (featuring Tech N9ne)	Liability
2015	"Bar Breaker"	Liability
2015	"Motel"	Liability
2015	"Gasoline"	Liability
2016	"Standout"	Liability
2016	"Windows" (with Atmosphere)	Non-album single
2016	"Time Bomb"	Pookie Baby
2018	"Andre The Giant"	Pookie Baby
2018	"Criminal"	Pookie Baby
2018	"No" (featuring Cashinova)	Pookie Baby
2018	"Light Work"	Pookie Baby
2018	"Eulogy"	Pookie Baby
2019	"Fuck You It's Christmas"	Non-album single
2020	"Animal Patrol"	Powderhorn Suites
2020	"Outside Baby"	Powderhorn Suites
2021	"Squad Goals"	Powderhorn Suites
2021	"Cousins" (featuring Cashinova)	Powderhorn Suites
2021	"Numbers" (featuring Muja Messiah, Taylor J)	Powderhorn Suites
2021	"Chitty Bang" (featuring Devin The Dude, Jarren Benton)	Non-album singles
2021	"Tarzan"	Non-album singles
2021	"Dodo Birds"	Non-album singles
2021	"Neighborhood" (with Tropidelic, Krayzie Bone)	Non-album singles
2021	"Cutthroat"	Non-album singles
2021	"Treat You Right" (featuring Dizzy Wright)	Non-album singles
2022	"Pay Day" (featuring JonRay)	Non-album singles
2022	"Creek Boy"	Horse
2022	"Devils Gate" (featuring Kevin Gates)	Horse
2022	"Big Hungry Monster"	Horse
2022	"Louisiana"	Horse
2022	"Vulnerable God"	Horse
2023	"Pack a Lunch" (featuring Redman)	Horse
2023	"Soupy" (featuring Cozz)	Horse
2023	"Subpar" (featuring Method Man)	Horse
2023	"Judy"	Horse
2023	"High Priced Shoes"	Horse
2023	"Tombstones"	Horse
2023	"Horse"	Horse
2024	"Feed The Dogs"	Non-album singles
2024	"errybody know" (with Futuristic)	Non-album singles
2024	"Pain Salesmen" (featuring Ren)	Non-album singles
2024	"Gone Fishin" (with Grieves)	Non-album singles
2024	"Butter" (featuring Baby Tate)	Non-album singles
2024	"Dynamite"	Good Time Boy
2025	"Bad Time Boy" (featuring Zombie Juice and Meechy Darko)	Non-album single
2025	"Destiny" (featuring Sauce Walka)	Good Time Boy
2025	"OH SHIT!!!" (with SonReal)	Non-album single
2025	"Dirty Work"	Good Time Boy
2025	"Lionhearted" (with Kota the Friend)	Non-album single
2026	"Big Dog" (with That Mexican OT & 2 Chainz)	Good Time Boy
2026	"Jewelry Duty" (with T-Pain)	Good Time Boy
2026	"Good Time Boy"	Good Time Boy
2026	"Kia Boy"	Good Time Boy
2026	"Kin (I'm Outside)" (with Pete & Bas & JonRay)	Good Time Boy
2026	"Brrrr" (with E-40)	Good Time Boy
