= Horse (album) =

Studio album by Prof
- Released: April 14, 2023
- Genre: Hip-hop
- Length: 49:00
- Label: Stophouse Music Group

Prof chronology
Powderhorn Suites (2020)	Horse (2023)	Good Time Boy (2026)

Horse is the sixth solo studio album by American rapper Prof. It was released on April 14, 2023. It is Prof's second self-released album following getting dropped by Rhymesayers Entertainment. It features guest appearances from Redman, Method Man, Kevin Gates, Cozz, and Mac Irv. The album peaked at number 111 on the Billboard 200 chart.

== Critical reception ==
Professional ratings
Review scores
Source	Rating
AllMusic	2.5/5 stars

Paul Simpson of AllMusic commented that "Even though he states 'I need a safe space for me to get toxic' on the opening track, it rarely feels like he's try to push the audience's buttons. Much of the album showcases Prof's slippery flows and offbeat sense of humor, which occasionally strays into self-deprecating, as on the Method Man-featuring 'Subpar' ('I'm doing subpar, how are you?')." The Pier said "Horse reaffirms Prof as a proven disruptor. The 14-track collection hinges on hilarious observations, hummable hooks, and hypnotic beats."

== Track listing ==
No.	Title	Length
1.	"High Priced Shoes"	3:42
2.	"Horse"	3:03
3.	"Snake Skin Leather"	3:26
4.	"Pack a Lunch" (featuring Redman)	4:19
5.	"Judy"	2:56
6.	"Devils Gate" (featuring Kevin Gates)	3:36
7.	"Big Hungry Monster"	3:17
8.	"Subpar" (featuring Method Man)	3:15
9.	"Soupy" (featuring Cozz)	3:27
10.	"Tough Boy" (featuring Mac Irv)	3:08
11.	"Louisiana"	4:11
12.	"Heaven"	3:24
13.	"Tombstones"	3:26
14.	"Creek Boy"	3:50
Total length:		49:00

== Charts ==
Chart (2023)	Peak position
US Billboard 200	111
