= Elephant Eyes =

Studio album by Omen
- Released: July 21, 2015
- Recorded: 2012–2015
- Genre: Conscious hip hop; jazz rap
- Length: 43:44
- Label: Dreamville
- Producer: J. Cole (exec.); Ibrahim Hamad (exec.); Omen; Ron Gilmore

Omen chronology
Afraid of Heights (2011)	Elephant Eyes (2015)

Elephant Eyes is the debut studio album by American rapper Omen and was released on July 21, 2015 by Dreamville Records. It includes features from Dreamville artists, J. Cole, Ari Lennox and Bas, as well as CJ Hamilton. Elephant Eyes served as Ari Lennox's introduction to Dreamville, Omen introduced her to J. Cole which eventually led to her signing to the label.

== Background and release ==
The album was removed from all streaming services due to sample issues, but remained available for free listen on SoundCloud. Physical copies of Elephant Eyes were available for purchase on Dreamville's official website for a limited time.

== Critical reception ==
Evan Vogel from The Early Registration said "By the end of the album, you feel like you are hearing a much more confident Omen than the shy, closed-off artist we got in the beginning. It shows progression, not only in music but in his number one concern, personal growth. He is more accepting of the randomness of life and seems more comfortable about who he is. The ability to hear a definite growth and transition in thought process is what pushes the project past being a collection of songs about one’s life. The artists involved with Dreamville records seem to be writing an elaborate collaborative book and this is one of the best chapters yet."

== Track listing ==
No.	Title	Writer(s)	Producer(s)	Length
1.	"Motion Picture"	Damon Coleman	Omen	4:31
2.	"LoveDrug" (featuring CJ Hamilton)	Coleman	Omen	4:47
3.	"Same Jezebel"	Coleman; Ron Gilmore	Ron Gilmore	2:15
4.	"Elephant Eyes"	Coleman	Omen	4:12
5.	"Father Figure"	Coleman	Omen	3:40
6.	"Sketches of Paranoia" (featuring Bas)	Coleman; Abbas Hamad	Omen	4:59
7.	"Sweat it Out" (featuring Ari Lennox)	Coleman; Courtney Salter	Omen	3:31
8.	"Foolish Pride"	Coleman	Omen	3:28
9.	"Big Shadows"	Coleman	Omen	4:53
10.	"Things Change" (featuring J. Cole)	Coleman; Gilmore; Jermaine Cole	Gilmore	3:39
11.	"Zion"	Coleman	Omen	3:49
Total length:				43:44

Sample Credits

- "Motion Picture" contains samples from "Way Star" performed by Rubba and "Impeach the President" performed by The Honey Drippers.
- "LoveDrug" contains a sample from "He Loves Me (Lyzel in E Flat)" performed by Jill Scott.
- "Elephant Eyes" contains a sample from "Mirrors" performed by Jhené Aiko.
- "Big Shadows" contains a sample from "If Tomorrow Never Comes" performed by The Controllers.
