= Bas (rapper) =

American rapper (born 1987)

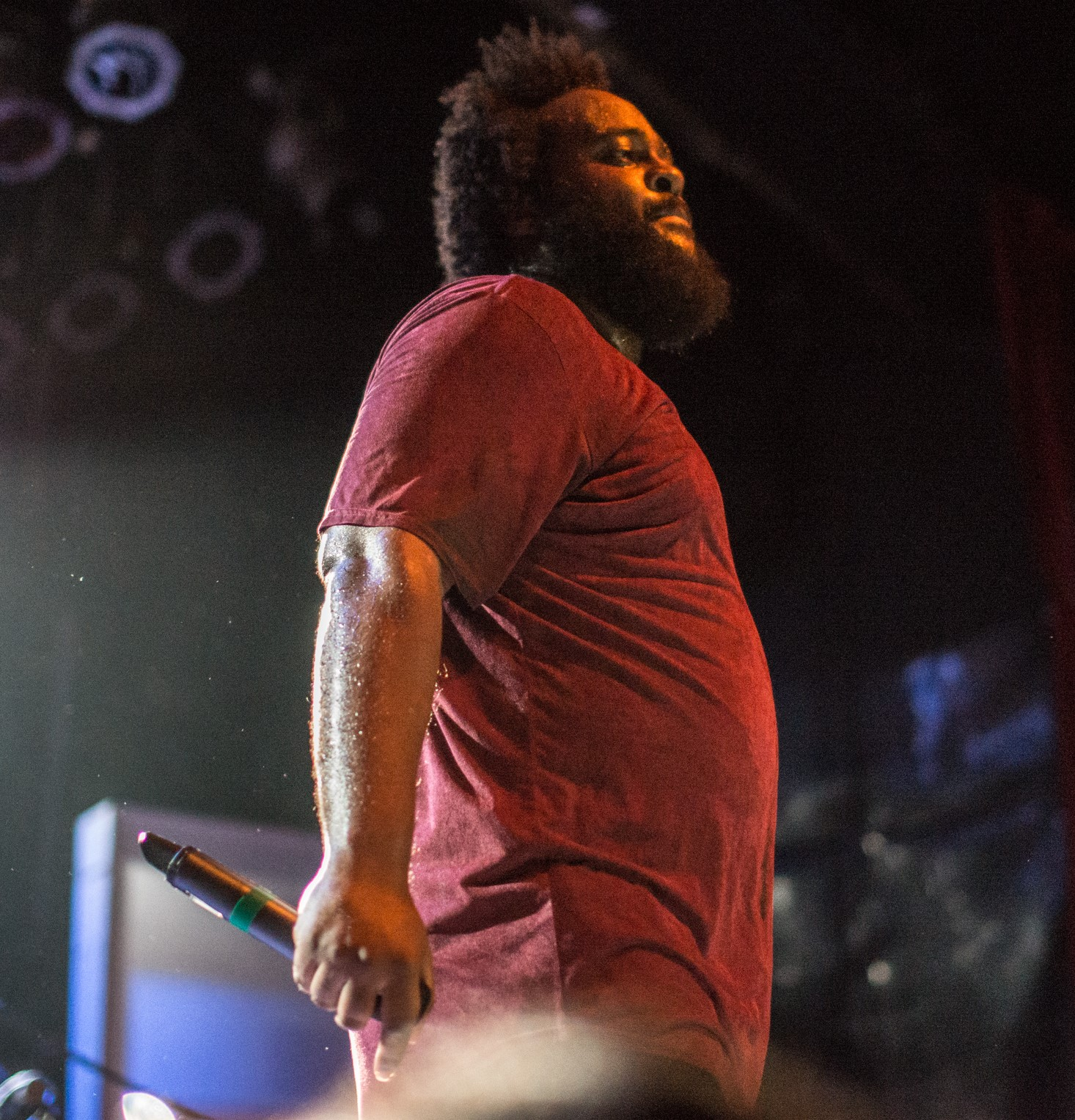
- Bas performing at The Mod Club in Toronto during Too High to Riot Tour in 2016

Background information
- Born: Abbas Hamad (Arabic: عباس حماد); May 27, 1987 (age 39); Paris, France
- Origin: New York City, U.S.
- Genres: Alternative hip-hop; Afrobeats
- Occupations: Rapper; songwriter
- Years active: 2010–present
- Labels: Dreamville; Interscope
- Website: fiends.nyc

Abbas Hamad (born May 27, 1987), known professionally as Bas, is a French-born American rapper. He signed with J. Cole's Dreamville Records, an imprint of Interscope Records to release his debut studio album, Last Winter (2014). It was met with positive critical reception and entered the Billboard 200, along with his second and third albums, Too High to Riot (2016) and Milky Way (2018). His fourth album, We Only Talk About Real Shit When We're Fucked Up (2023) was met with continued praise.

== Early life ==
Bas was born on May 27, 1987, in Paris, France, to Sudanese parents. He is a Muslim. His father was a diplomat working as the Deputy Director of UNESCO. Bas has three older brothers and an older sister; one brother is New York-based DJ Moma, and another, Ibrahim, is a music industry executive and cofounder of Dreamville Records. At age 8, after having lived in Paris and Qatar, the family settled in Jamaica, Queens, New York City. Bas attended St. Francis Preparatory School in Fresh Meadows, Queens, then Hampton University in Hampton, Virginia, with a full scholarship.

== Musical career ==
=== 2011–2013: Career beginnings and mixtapes ===
In 2011, Bas released his debut mixtape titled Quarter Water Raised Vol. 1. In 2013, his second mixtape was released entitled, Quarter Water Raised Vol. 2.

In 2013, Bas was featured on J. Cole's "New York Times" along with 50 Cent from Cole's album Born Sinner, and then on DJ Khaled's "Hells Kitchen" from Suffering from Success. He then appeared on the Dreamville compilation mixtape Revenge of the Dreamers. That mixtape was released in celebration of Dreamville's partnership with Interscope Records, resulting in Bas being signed to Interscope. Two weeks prior to the release of his debut album Last Winter, Bas released a free EP titled Two Weeks Notice.

=== 2014–2015: Last Winter ===
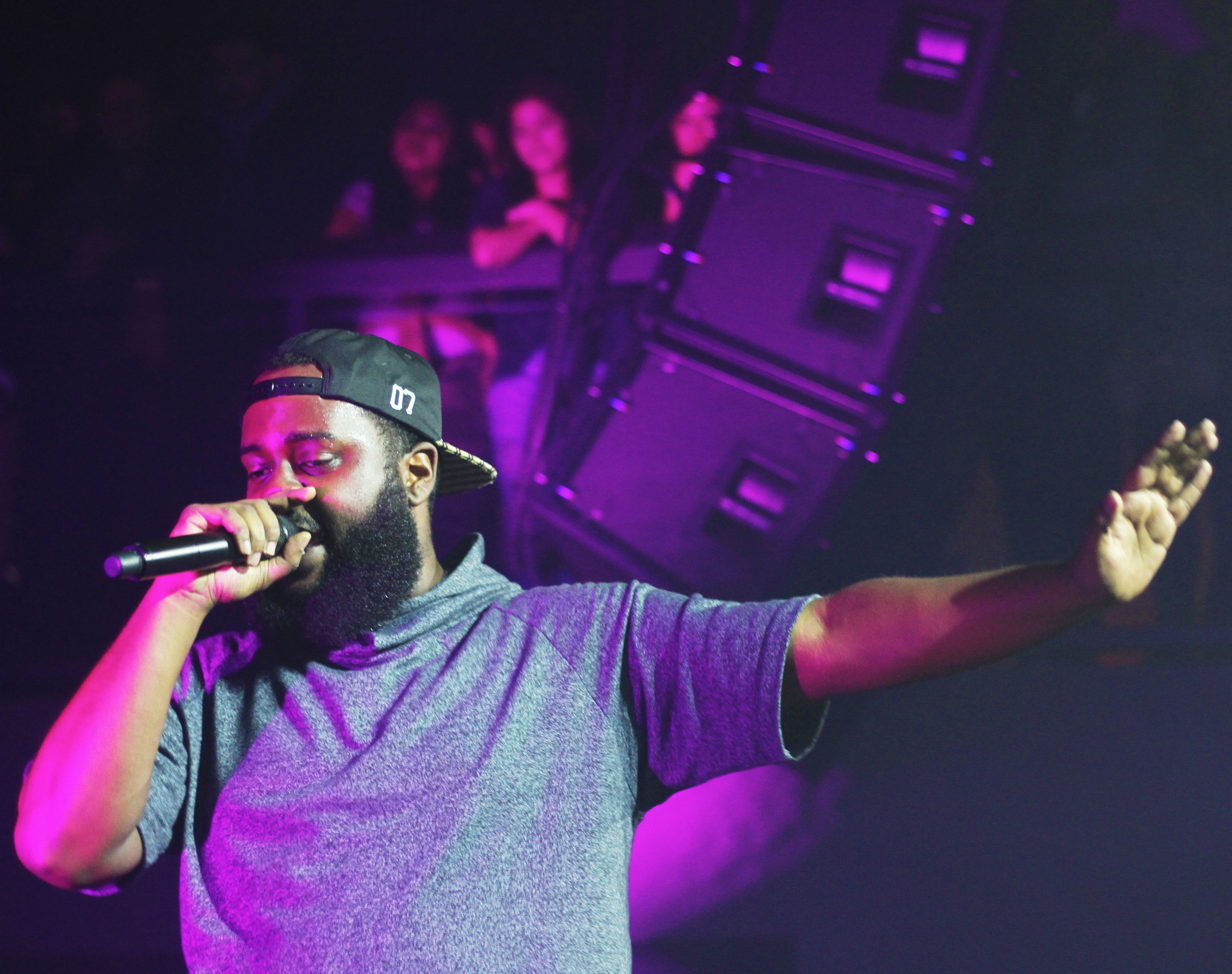
Bas performing during What Dreams May Come Tour in January 2014.

Last Winter was released on April 29, 2014, by Dreamville Records/Interscope Records. It featured guest appearances from J. Cole, Mack Wilds, KQuick, and Irvin Washington. The album was a conceptual project that touches on the cold days in New York City recording the album. The album was supported by the single "My Nigga Just Made Bail" produced by GP808 and featured guest appearances by J. Cole. Last Winter would debut at 103 on the Billboard 200 with 3,601 copies sold in its first week.

Following its release, Bas went on a 10-city nationwide tour titled after the album. Bas followed his own "Last Winter" tour by going on a 24-city nationwide and international tour with TDE rapper Ab-Soul. In 2015, Bas supported J. Cole on '2014 Forest Hills Drive Tour' alongside Omen, Cozz, Jeremih, YG, and Big Sean.

=== 2016–2017: Too High to Riot ===
Bas released his second album, Too High to Riot on March 4, 2016. The album also includes guest appearances from his labelmates J. Cole and Cozz, as well as the Hics. The album would debut at 49 on the Billboard 200 chart, selling 10,965 copies in its first week. He also later released a music video for each song on the album. Bas went on tour titled after the album in June 2016 with Cozz and EarthGang. It included 26 cities in North America and 10 cities in Europe, including his hometown of Koewacht. On January 29, 2017, the documentary highlighting the tour was released on Tidal.

=== 2018–2019: Milky Way ===
On April 10, 2018, Bas released the one-off single "Pinball II", featuring Correy C. The first single for his third album "Boca Raton" was released on June 19, and featured ASAP Ferg. On August 22, he released the second single "Tribe" featuring J. Cole. Bas released his third album, Milky Way on August 24, 2018. It featured guest appearances from J. Cole, Ari Lennox, ASAP Ferg, Lion Babe, Moe Moks, mOma+Guy, and Correy C. The album debuted at number 35 on the Billboard 200, selling 13,150 album-equivalent units in the first week. Bas announced a 43-city tour to support the album, which began in November 2018 and concluded in February 2019. In late 2018, Bas announced he was working on an album with frequent collaborators The Hics.

On August 9, 2019, Bas released the Spilled Milk 1 EP. The EP features guest appearances from EarthGang, JID, Falcons, B. Lewis, Ari Lennox, and Kiddominant. On November 5, 2019, Bas was featured on the FKJ single "Risk".

=== 2020-2025: We Only Talk About Real Shit When We're Fucked Up ===
In September 2020, Dua Saleh released the single "RE(a)D" featuring Bas. On April 15, 2022, Bas released the [BUMP] Pick Me Up EP. The EP features guest appearances from Galimatias, Gunna, Ari Lennox, J. Cole and Lil Tjay. On January 24, 2023, Bas released the single "Diamonds".

On July 15, 2023, Bas announced the title of his fourth studio album, We Only Talk About Real Shit When We're Fucked Up. On July 19, 2023, Bas released the single "Passport Bros" featuring J. Cole as the album's lead single. He released the single "Ho Chi Minh" on August 19, 2023, alongside the official music video. He released the single "Khartoum" featuring Adekunle Gold on October 24, 2023. The album's fourth and final single, "179 Deli" featuring UK rapper AJ Tracey was released on November 28, 2023. The album released on December 15, 2023. It features guest appearances from Adekunle Gold, AJ Tracey, Amaarae, A$AP Ferg, Blxckie, FKJ, J. Cole and Sha Sha.

== Discography ==
=== Studio albums ===
List of albums, with selected chart positions
Title	Album details	Peak chart positions					
Title	Album details	US	US R&B/HH	US Rap	BEL (FL)	CAN	NLD
Last Winter	Released: April 29, 2014; Label: Dreamville, Interscope; Format: CD, digital download	103	18	13	—	—	—
Too High to Riot	Released: March 4, 2016; Label: Dreamville, Interscope; Format: CD, LP, digital download	49	7	6	—	—	—
Milky Way	Released: August 24, 2018; Label: Dreamville, Interscope; Format: CD, LP, digital download	35	19	17	180	65	109
We Only Talk About Real Shit When We're Fucked Up	Released: December 15, 2023; Label: Dreamville, Interscope; Format: CD, LP, digital download	—	—	—	—	—	—
"—" denotes a recording that did not chart or was not released in that territory.

=== Extended plays ===
Title	Album details
Spilled Milk 1	Released: August 9, 2019; Label: Dreamville, Interscope; Format: Digital Download
[BUMP] Pick Me Up	Released: April 15, 2022; Label: Dreamville, Interscope; Format: Digital Download

=== Compilation albums ===
List of albums, with selected chart positions
Title	Details	Peak chart positions			Certifications
Title	Details	US	US R&B/HH	US Rap	Certifications
Revenge of the Dreamers II (with Dreamville)	Released: December 8, 2015; Label: Dreamville, Interscope; Format: CD, digital download	29	4	3	
Revenge of the Dreamers III (with Dreamville)	Released: July 5, 2019; Label: Dreamville, Interscope; Format: CD, digital download	1	1	1	RIAA: Platinum
D-Day: A Gangsta Grillz Mixtape (with Dreamville)	Released: March 31, 2022; Label: Dreamville, Interscope; Format: Digital download	11	6	4	

=== Mixtapes ===
Title	Mixtape details
Quarter Water Raised Me Vol. 1	Released: June 7, 2011; Format: Digital download
Quarter Water Raised Me Vol. 2	Released: May 26, 2013; Format: Digital download
Two Weeks Notice	Released: April 15, 2014; Format: Digital download

=== Singles ===
==== As lead artist ====
Title	Year	Peak chart positions						Certifications	Album
Title	Year	US	US R&B/HH	US Rap	CAN	NZ	UK	Certifications	Album
"Lit" (featuring J. Cole & KQuick)	2013	—	—	—	—	—	—		Last Winter
"My Nigga Just Made Bail" (featuring J. Cole)	2014	—	—	—	—	—	—		Last Winter
"Charles De Gaulle to JFK"	2014	—	—	—	—	—	—		Last Winter
"Night Job" (featuring J. Cole)	2015	—	—	—	—	—	—		Too High to Riot
"Housewives"	2015	—	—	—	—	—	—		Too High to Riot
"Methylone"	2016	—	—	—	—	—	—		Too High to Riot
"Don't Front"	2017	—	—	—	—	—	—		Non-album singles
"Pinball II" (featuring Correy C)	2018	—	—	—	—	—	—		Non-album singles
"Boca Raton" (featuring ASAP Ferg)	2018	—	—	—	—	—	—		Milky Way
"Tribe" (with J. Cole)	2018	— (Note: "Tribe" did not enter the Billboard Hot 100, but peaked at number eight on the Bubbling Under Hot 100 chart.)	48	—	—	—	—	RIAA: Platinum; BPI: Silver	Milky Way
"Fragrance" (featuring Correy C)	2018	—	—	—	—	—	—		Milky Way
"Purge"	2019	—	—	—	—	—	—		Milky Way
"Down Bad" (with J. Cole, JID, and EarthGang featuring Young Nudy)	2019	64	26	22	69	— (Note: "Down Bad" did not enter the NZ Top 40 Singles Chart, but peaked at number 10 on the NZ Hot Singles Chart.)	—	RIAA: Platinum; RMNZ: Gold	Revenge of the Dreamers III
"Costa Rica" (with JID, featuring Guapdad 4000, Reese Laflare, Jace, Mez, Smokepurpp, Buddy and Ski Mask the Slump God)	2019	75	30	—	71	—	—	RIAA: Platinum; RMNZ: Gold	Revenge of the Dreamers III
"Fried Rice" (featuring JID)	2019	—	—	—	—	—	—		Spilled Milk 1
"Jollof Rice" (featuring EarthGang)	2019	—	—	—	—	—	—		Spilled Milk 1
"Smoke From Fire" (featuring The Hics)		—	—	—	—	—	—		Non-album single
"The Jackie" (with J. Cole and Lil Tjay)	2021	78	26	22	60	— (Note: "The Jackie" did not enter the NZ Top 40 Singles Chart, but peaked at number seven on the NZ Hot Singles Chart.)	100		[Bump] Pick Me Up
"Admire Her" (featuring Gunna)	2022	—	—	—	—	—	—		[Bump] Pick Me Up
"Run It Up"	2022	—	—	—	—	—	—		Madden NFL 23
"Diamonds"	2023	—	—	—	—	—	—		We Only Talk About Real Shit When We're Fucked Up
"Passport Bros" (with J. Cole)	2023	—	—	—	—	— (Note: "Passport Bros" did not enter the NZ Top 40 Singles Chart, but peaked at number 28 on the NZ Hot Singles Chart.)	—		We Only Talk About Real Shit When We're Fucked Up
"Ho Chi Minh"	2023	—	—	—	—	—	—		We Only Talk About Real Shit When We're Fucked Up
"Khartoum" (with Adekunle Gold)	2023	—	—	—	—	—	—		We Only Talk About Real Shit When We're Fucked Up
"179 Deli" (with AJ Tracey)	2023	—	—	—	—	—	—		We Only Talk About Real Shit When We're Fucked Up
"H.Y.B." (with J. Cole and Central Cee)	2024	35	17	15	34	36	29		Might Delete Later
"—" denotes a recording that did not chart or was not released in that territory.

==== As featured artist ====
List of singles, with year released and album name shown
Title	Year	Album
"Braille" (Ab-Soul featuring Bas)	2016	Do What Thou Wilt.
"Can't Call It" (Spillage Village featuring EarthGang, JID, J. Cole and Bas)	2016	Bears Like This Too Much
"Risk" (FKJ featuring Bas)	2020	Ylang Ylang EP
"B.Q.E." (Kota the Friend featuring Joey Badass & Bas)	2020	Everything
"GPS" (Galimatias featuring Bas & Xavier Omär)	2020	Renaissance Boy
"Fallin'" (Girl Talk featuring Bas)	2020	—N/a
"RE(a)D" (Dua Saleh featuring Bas)	2020	—N/a
"Romeo" (Jungle featuring Bas)	2021	Loving in Stereo
"Selfish" (PRICE featuring Bas & Wyclef Jean)	2021	F.O.E.S.
"Spill" (Anik Khan featuring Bas)	2021	Approved
"Show Me Something" (Malik Moses featuring Bas)	2021	Show Me Something New
"Overseas" (Powers Pleasant featuring Maxo Kream, Erick the Architect, Bas & Kenny Mason)	2022	—N/a
"For Good" (The C!ircle featuring Bas)	2023	—N/a
"Blood, Sweat & Tears" (Dreamville featuring Bas, Black Sherif & Kel-P)	2023	Creed III: The Soundtrack
"Enthralled" (Lordkez featuring Bas)	2023	Testament

=== Other charted songs ===
List of songs, with selected chart positions, showing year released and album name
Title	Year	Peak chart positions						Certifications	Album
Title	Year	US	US R&B/HH	US Rap	AUS	CAN	NZ Hot	Certifications	Album
"100 Mil'" (with J. Cole)	2021	14	10	8	30	24	—	RIAA: Gold	The Off-Season
"Let Go My Hand" (with J. Cole and 6lack)	2021	19	13	11	27	23	—	RIAA: Gold	The Off-Season
"Hunger on Hillside" (with J. Cole)	2021	28	17	15	46	33	—		The Off-Season
"Home Alone" (with J. Cole)	2023	—	—	—	—	—	19		We Only Talk About Real Shit When We're Fucked Up
"—" denotes a recording that did not chart or was not released in that territory.

=== Guest appearances ===
List of non-single guest appearances, with other performing artists, showing year released and album name
Title	Year	Other artist(s)	Album
"Cousins"	2013	J. Cole	Truly Yours 2
"New York Times"	2013	J. Cole, 50 Cent	Born Sinner
"Hell's Kitchen"	2013	DJ Khaled, J. Cole	Suffering from Success
"I Need That"	2014	Cozz	Cozz & Effect
"Sketches of Paranoia"	2015	Omen	Elephant Eyes
"Keep On Goin"	2017	Russ	—N/a
"And You"	2018	Token, IDK	Between Somewhere
"Addicted 2 (Keep Cool Remix)"	2019	VanJess	Silk Canvas (The Remixes)
"Link Up"	2019	Buddy, Guapdad 4000, Kent Jamz, JID, Ari Lennox	Harlan & Alondra
"Ap3x (Remastered)"	2019	Shane Eagle	—N/a
"Don't Hit Me Right Now"	2019	Cozz, Yung Baby Tate, Guapdad 4000 & Buddy	Revenge of the Dreamers III
"Self Love"	2019	Ari Lennox, Baby Rose	Revenge of the Dreamers III
"Dead Body"	2019	The C!rcle, AKA Keyz	A 249 Experience, Vol. 1
"Vanya"	2019	Shane Eagle, Santi	Dark Moon Flower
"No Permission Needed"	2019	Rexx Life Raj	Father Figure 3: Somewhere Out There
"Flick It Up (Remix)"	2020	Reason, Junii, Jah The Great	—N/a
"Nobody Knows"	2020	Cassper Nyovest, YoungstaCPT, Apu Sebekedi	A.M.N (Any Minute Now)
"Outta Pocket"	2020	Cozz	Revenge of the Dreamers III: Director's Cut
"Spin Move"	2020	Smino, Saba, The Hics	Revenge of the Dreamers III: Director's Cut
"No Chorus"	2020	Buddy, Guapdad 4000, Dreezy	Revenge of the Dreamers III: Director's Cut
"Party"	2021	Kddo, Jidenna	Too Late Too Lit
"Lifestyle"	2022	ASAP Ferg	D-Day: A Gangsta Grillz Mixtape
"Jozi Flows"	2022	EarthGang	D-Day: A Gangsta Grillz Mixtape
"Fretless"	2022	Beau Diako, Etta Bond	Nylon
"Wish You"	2022	Juls, Mannywellz	Sounds of My World
"On & On"	2022	Alex Isley, Jack Dine	Marigold
"Pretty Little Thing"	2023	Jungle	Volcano
"Romeo II"	2026	Jungle	Sunshine

== Awards and nominations ==
Year	Award	Category	Work	Result	Ref.
2020	Grammy Award	Best Rap Performance	"Down Bad" (with J. Cole, JID, EarthGang and Young Nudy)	Nominated	
