= Liability (album) =

Studio album by Prof
- Released: October 16, 2015
- Genre: Hip-hop
- Length: 61:15
- Label: Rhymesayers Entertainment
- Producers: Mux Mool; J.J. Jabber; Insightful; 84 Caprice; Aesop Rock; Curtiss King; Willie Wonka; Afrobeats; Big Chocolate; DJ Two Stacks; Chickenbone; MarkMadeThis; Ant

Prof chronology
Kaiser Von Powderhorn 3 (2012)	Liability (2015)	Pookie Baby (2018)

Singles from Liability
- 1. "Farout" Released: September 23, 2014

Liability is the third solo studio album by American rapper Prof. It was released via Rhymesayers Entertainment on October 16, 2015. It is Prof's first album with Rhymesayers. It features guest appearances from Tech N9ne, Petey Pablo, and Waka Flocka Flame. The album peaked at number 141 on the Billboard 200 chart, as well as number 19 on the Top R&B/Hip-Hop Albums chart.

== Critical reception ==
Professional ratings
Review scores
Source	Rating
AllMusic	4/5 stars

David Jeffries of AllMusic commented that "Guest shots from Tech N9ne ('Ghost') and Petey Pablo ('King') represent how weird and wild this guy plays it, but the local emo kids Atmosphere love the man as well, and they're likely appreciative that his brand of chaos is crafted as it comes." He added, "Liability is proof that Prof is an off-kilter but discerning MC." Jesse Sendejas Jr. of Houston Press praised the album as being like Laurence Sterne's The Life and Opinions of Tristram Shandy, Gentleman.

== Track listing ==
No.	Title	Producer(s)	Length
1.	"Galore"	Mux Mool	3:17
2.	"Ghost" (featuring Tech N9ne)	J.J. Jabber	4:15
3.	"King" (featuring Petey Pablo)	Insightful	4:36
4.	"Standout"	J.J. Jabber	3:44
5.	"Farout"	84 Caprice	2:57
6.	"Bar Breaker"	Aesop Rock	2:45
7.	"Church"	Curtiss King	3:14
8.	"I Had Sex in the 90's"	Willie Wonka	3:23
9.	"Motel"	Afrobeats	3:28
10.	"Love Like Mine"	J.J. Jabber	4:20
11.	"Mob"	Curtiss King	3:02
12.	"Apeshit" (featuring Waka Flocka Flame)	Big Chocolate; DJ Two Stacks	4:11
13.	"Cloud 9"	Chickenbone	4:35
14.	"True Love"	MarkMadeThis	6:19
15.	"Permission"	Ant	2:57
16.	"Gasoline"	84 Caprice	4:18
Total length:			61:15

== Charts ==
Chart (2015)	Peak position
US Billboard 200	141
US Top R&B/Hip-Hop Albums (Billboard)	19
