= Cozz =

American rapper

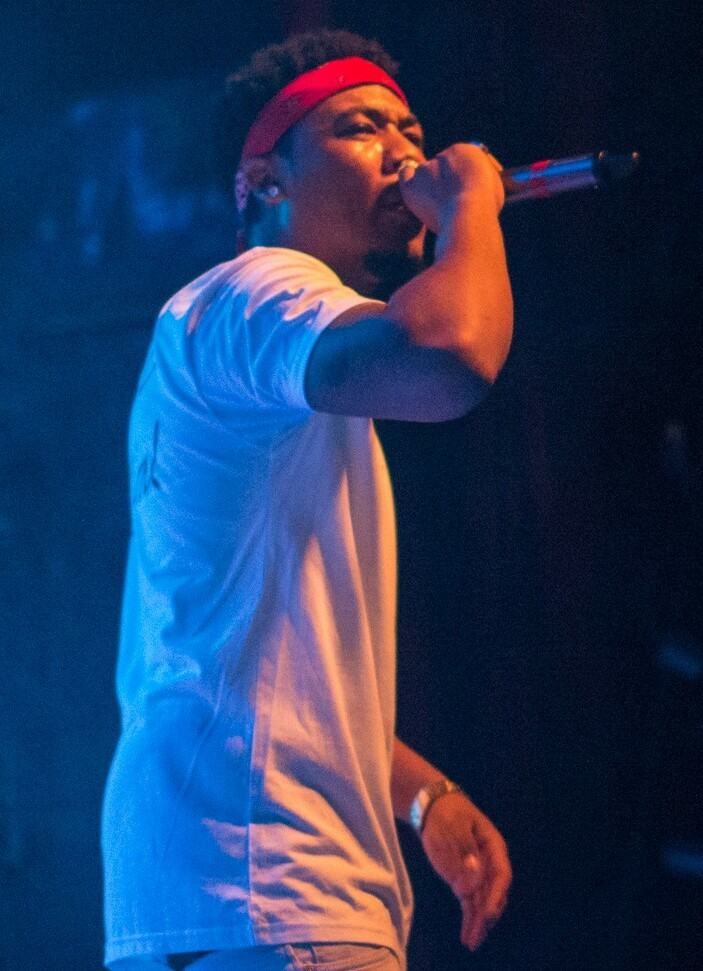
- Cozz during Too High to Riot tour, 2016

Background information
- Born: Cody Osagie; Los Angeles, California, U.S.
- Genres: Hip hop
- Occupations: Rapper; songwriter; producer
- Years active: 2013–present
- Labels: Dreamville; Tha Committee; Interscope

Cody Rashad Osagie, better known by his stage name Cozz, is an American rapper. He is signed to J. Cole's label Dreamville Records and Interscope Records. His debut studio album Cozz & Effect, was released in October 2014. He has since released other projects, such as his 2016 project Nothin' Personal and in 2018 he released Effected his second Studio Album. He also released his Fortunate EP in 2021.

== Career ==
=== 2013–2015: Career beginnings and Cozz & Effect ===
In 2013, Cozz began to take rap seriously, and recorded a demo tape. A few months later, he released the music video for "Dreams". Shortly after, he started to get notice, and having meetings with many different labels. Cozz's manager brought the music video to J. Cole and was later signed to Dreamville Records.

On October 3, 2014, Cozz released his debut album Cozz & Effect The project was initially intended as a free mixtape upon recording. But according to Cozz, when it was finished, it sounded better than they had hoped and they therefore agreed it can be sold. Dreamville Records released it on digital format firstly, followed by physical CD a short while afterwards. In 2015, Cozz was a part of J. Cole's "2014 Forest Hills Drive Tour" along with other acts Bas, Omen, Pusha T, Jhene Aiko, Jeremih, YG, and Big Sean.

=== 2016–2020: Nothin' Personal and Effected ===
On January 4, 2016, Cozz released his second project, and first mixtape, Nothin' Personal. The mixtape was entirely produced by Meez. Features include fellow west coast rapper Boogie, Bas, and Free Ackrite. The mixtape was supported with four singles: "Tabs," "Growth," "My Side," and "Who Said."

On February 13, 2018, he released his second album Effected which includes features from J. Cole and Kendrick Lamar. Singles and music videos for the album includes "Questions", "Demons N Distractions", and "Bout It". On April 4, 2018, Cozz announced The Effected Tour in North American in 16 cities, to further promote the album. He was also featured on Los Angeles rapper JAG's album with Reason on the track "Black Boy Rise". On November 7, Cozz worked with DJ Megan Ryte on a 5-track mixtape called Aftermath Of My Dreams.

=== 2021–present: Fortunate EP ===
On October 22, 2021, Cozz released the first single from the EP of the same name titled "Fortunate", produced by T-Minus, J. Cole, Kurzweil, and Ced Breeze. On November 17, he released the second single "Addicted", along with a music video. On December 2, Cozz released the EP Fortunate, which features a guest appearance from YG.

== Discography ==
=== Studio albums ===
List of albums, with album details and selected chart positions
| Title | Album details | Peak chart positions | | |
| Title | Album details | US | US R&B/HH | US Rap |
|---|---|---|---|---|
| Cozz & Effect | Released: October 3, 2014; Label: Dreamville, Interscope; Format: CD, digital download | 160 | 31 | 17 |
| Effected | Released: February 13, 2018; Label: Dreamville, Interscope; Format: digital download | — | — | 22 |
"—" denotes a recording that did not chart or was not released in that territory.

=== Extended plays ===
| Title | Album details |
|---|---|
| Fortunate | Released: December 2, 2021; Label: Dreamville, Interscope; Format: Digital Download |

=== Mixtapes ===
| Title | Album details |
|---|---|
| Nothin Personal | Released: January 4, 2016; Label: Dreamville; Format: Digital Download |
| Aftermath Of My Dreams (with DJ Megan Ryte) | Released: November 7, 2018; Format: Digital Download |

=== Compilation albums ===
List of albums, with selected chart positions
| Title | Details | Peak chart positions | | | Certifications |
| Title | Details | US | US R&B/HH | US Rap | Certifications |
|---|---|---|---|---|---|
| Revenge of the Dreamers II (with Dreamville) | Released: December 8, 2015; Label: Dreamville, Interscope; Format: CD, digital download | 29 | 4 | 3 | |
| Revenge of the Dreamers III (with Dreamville) | Released: July 5, 2019; Label: Dreamville, Interscope; Format: CD, digital download | 1 | 1 | 1 | RIAA: Platinum |
| D-Day: A Gangsta Grillz Mixtape (with Dreamville) | Released: March 31, 2022; Label: Dreamville, Interscope; Format: Digital download | 11 | 6 | 4 | |

=== Singles ===
==== As lead artist ====
| Title | Year | Album |
|---|---|---|
| "Dreams" | 2014 | Cozz & Effect |
| "Cody Macc" | 2014 | Cozz & Effect |
| "I'm Tha Man" | 2015 | Cozz & Effect |
| "Knock Tha Hustle" (featuring J. Cole) | 2015 | Cozz & Effect |
| "Tabs" (featuring Bas) | 2015 | Nothin Personal |
| "Growth" (featuring Correy C) | 2015 | Nothin Personal |
| "My Side" | 2015 | Nothin Personal |
| "Who Said" | 2016 | Nothin Personal |
| "Questions" | 2018 | Effected |
| "Demons N Distractions" | 2018 | Effected |
| "Bout It" | 2018 | Effected |
| "Fortunate" | 2021 | Fortunate |
| "Addicted" | 2021 | Fortunate |
| "Cry" | 2021 | Fortunate |

==== As featured artist ====
List of singles as a featured artist, showing year released and album name
| Title | Year | Album |
|---|---|---|
| "LamboTruck" (Dreamville featuring Cozz, Reason & Childish Major) | 2019 | Revenge of the Dreamers III |
| "Try" (Mark Battles featuring Cozz & Keara Alyse) | 2020 | Try (Single) |
| "Play Games Witchu" (Ohana Bam in collaboration with Cozz) | 2022 | Play Games Witchu (Single) |
| "Scary" (DJ Semtex in collaboration with Cozz & Twitch 4EVA) | 2022 | Scary (Single) |
| "ON GO" (Price in collaboration with Cozz) | 2023 | ON GO (Single) |
| "Soupy" (Prof featuring Cozz) | 2023 | Soupy (Single) |
| "Don't Waste My Time" (Rick Bars in collaboration with Cozz) | 2023 | Don't Waste My Time (Single) |
| "All on Me" (Ohana Bam in collaboration with Cozz) | 2023 | All on Me (Single) |
| "Saturday" (NCognita featuring Cozz) | 2023 | Saturday (Single) |
| "Ace of Hearts" (JG in collaboration with Cozz) | 2023 | Ace of Hearts (Single) |
| "Dead Men" (408 Darwin featuring Cozz) | 2023 | Dead Men (Single) |

=== Guest appearances ===
List of non-single guest appearances, with other performing artists, showing year released and album name
| Title | Year | Other artist(s) | Album |
|---|---|---|---|
| "Free My Mind" | 2015 | Mani Coolin | Hope4TheYouth |
| "Backseat" | 2015 | Ari Lennox | Pho |
| "Dopamine" | 2016 | Bas | Too High to Riot |
| "Same Thing" | 2016 | Meez, Correy C | Non-album single |
| "Foreign Girl" | 2016 | Correy C | Salutations |
| "Give N Go" | 2017 | Smoke DZA | Non-album single |
| "The Hook Up" | 2018 | Smoke DZA, Dom Kennedy | Not For Sale |
| "Black Boy Rise" | 2018 | JAG, Reason | 2700 |
| "Don't Hit Me Right Now" | 2019 | Bas, Yung Baby Tate, Guapdad 4000 & Buddy | Revenge of the Dreamers III |
| "1993" | 2019 | Buddy, Smino, EARTHGANG, JID, J. Cole | Revenge of the Dreamers III |
| "Spin Move" | 2020 | Bas | Revenge of the Dreamers III: Director's Cut |
| "Late Night" | 2020 | Omen, Buddy, Landstrip Chip | Revenge of the Dreamers III: Director's Cut |
| "Disgusted" | 2020 | Childish Major | Revenge of the Dreamers III: Director's Cut |
| "Try" | 2020 | Mark Battles, Keara Alyse | —N/a |
| "Eye To Eye" | 2021 | Lute | Gold Mouf |
| "Starting 5" | 2022 | Lute, Omen | D-Day: A Gangsta Grillz Mixtape |
| "Hair Salon" | 2022 | G Perico, Reason | D-Day: A Gangsta Grillz Mixtape |
| "Big Trouble Freestyle" | 2022 | —N/a | D-Day: A Gangsta Grillz Mixtape |
| "Soupy" | 2023 | Prof | Horse |
