= Cozz & Effect =

Studio album by Cozz
- Released: October 3, 2014
- Recorded: 2014
- Genre: Hip-hop
- Length: 42:42
- Labels: Dreamville; Interscope
- Producers: Divenchi; Meez; Mike Adam; Trauma Tone

Cozz chronology
Cozz & Effect (2014)	Nothin Personal (2016)

Singles from Cozz & Effect
- 1. "Dreams" Released: February 27, 2014; 2. "Cody Macc" Released: September 30, 2014; 3. "I'm Tha Man" Released: January 26, 2015; 4. "Knock Tha Hustle" Released: March 26, 2015

Cozz & Effect is the debut studio album by American rapper Cozz. It was released on October 3, 2014, through Dreamville/Interscope Records. Production was handled by Meez, Trauma Tone, Divenchi and Mike Adam. It features guest appearances from Bas, Enimal, Free Akrite and J. Cole.

In the United States, the album peaked at number 31 on the Top R&B/Hip-Hop Albums and number 17 on the Top Rap Albums charts.

== Critical reception ==
Professional ratings
Review scores
Source	Rating
AllMusic	4/5 stars
HipHopDX	3.5/5

The album received acclaim upon its release, with critics highly praising Cozz's rhyme schemes and lyrical themes along with the production. Justin Hunte of HipHopDX wrote: "Cozz's shifting rhyme schemes impress throughout Cozz & Effect. He'll enter a track bombastically off-kilter, stumble into a separate topic four-bars-in, and then lyrically wreck shop the rest of the way", and "Cozz & Effect serves as passport to the conversation. It's brash, passionate, and lyrically impressive enough to anticipate the future—an emphatic win for all involved". Mike Philson of HotNewHipHop wrote: "Cozz has a lot of upside, and proves he is as fine a wordsmith as any other young rapper in the game on Cozz & Effect. We're looking forward to him exhibit a bit more range as an artist, as can only come with more life experiences. It's a solid project if you're a fan of raw lyrical ability. Cozz definitely represented J. Cole's label well, as Cozz is a rapper's rapper, a hip-hop purist, with the whole world at his fingertips".

== Track listing ==
No.	Title	Writer(s)	Producer(s)	Length
1.	"Dreams"	Cody Osagie; Joshua Morgan	Meez	3:36
2.	"Come Get It"	Osagie; Morgan	Meez	3:30
3.	"Cody Macc"	Osagie; Morgan	Meez	4:20
4.	"I'm Tha Man"	Osagie; Mike Adam	Mike Adam	4:15
5.	"Knock Tha Hustle"	Osagie; John Carrington; Jermaine Cole	Trauma Tone	3:02
6.	"Western Ave. Slaves" (featuring Enimal)	Osagie; Lamine Diop; Morgan	Meez	3:23
7.	"Murda"	Osagie; Morgan	Meez	3:03
8.	"DKBU (Interlude)"	Osagie; Morgan	Meez	2:46
9.	"LSN" (featuring Free Akrite)	Osagie; Morgan	Meez	4:17
10.	"I Need That" (featuring Bas)	Osagie; Abbas Hamad; David Joseph	Divenchi	4:03
11.	"Ya Know Dat"	Osagie; Morgan	Meez	2:17
12.	"Knock Tha Hustle (Remix)" (featuring J. Cole)	Osagie; Cole; Carrington	Trauma Tone	4:10
Total length:				42:42

== Charts ==
Chart (2014)	Peak position
US Top R&B/Hip-Hop Albums (Billboard)	31
US Top Rap Albums (Billboard)	17
