= The Hics =

English electronic band (formed 2012)

- Origin: London, England
- Genres: Alternative music: Soul music; R&B
- Years active: 2013–present
- Members: Sam Paul Evans; Roxane Barker
- Past members: David Turay; Matt Knox; Geordan Reid-Campbell; Jacob Welsh
- Website: thehics.com

The Hics are an English R&B duo from London. Originally a six piece band, they became a duo in 2016 fronted by Sam Paul Evans and Roxane Barker.

== History ==
The band members met at Pimlico School, now Pimlico Academy, whilst on the music programme. The Hics were originally formed as a two-piece electronic indie band between Sam Paul Evans and Jacob Welsh, and were later joined by fellow Pimilco allum Roxane Barker on vocals and Geordan Reid-Campbell on guitar. The band met their fifth and sixth members, bassist Matt Knox and saxophonist David Turay, through Londons Jazz scene. The Hics got their name from hickory, the wood from which some drumsticks are made.

Their first single, "Lines", was released September 30th 2012 through their SoundCloud page. The song was soon picked up by BBC Radio 6 Music DJ Gilles Peterson, who later included it on his compilation Brownswood Bubblers Nine, released on December 10th 2012. In January 2013, the band were runners-up for the Best Breakthrough Act category at Gilles Peterson's Worldwide Awards.

Their second single, "Cold Air", was released on February 19th 2013, again, to The Hics' SoundCloud page. The song "Cold Air" would later be featured on the in-game radio station Worldwide FM of the 2013 video game Grand Theft Auto V. On March 6th 2013, they were mentioned in the NME magazine after being promoted by Real Star Records. They released the track "Tangle" on July 8th 2013, as a teaser for their upcoming EP of the same name.

Tangle was released August of 2013. The band played their first headline show at Electrowerkz in London on August 1st to a sold-out crowd. The music video for the song "Tangle", their first music video, premiered on 3 September 2013.

In May 2014 the band released a new song on their SoundCloud page entitled "All We'll Know". The music video for the song premiered on June 9th 2014 and the song was officially released as a single on June 16th 2014. The Hics collaborated with drummer Richard Spaven on a song entitled "Whole Other*", which was released on his album of the same name on July 7th 2014. On September 19th 2014 The Hics were filmed for an appearance on the Channel 4 Four to the Floor series, performing their latest single "All We'll Know". The episode was broadcast on October 1st. In November 2014 The Hics' Saxophone player David Turay passed away at the age of 18. Considering that two other band mates had lost parents that year the band took a hiatus to mourn.

In mid-2015 The Hics were signed to the OddChild Music label. The Hics' first new material in 10 months was released on Little Simz' debut album on September 18th 2015. That year, bass player Matt Knox departed the band. Later that year Welsh and Campbell also parted.

The Hics in the form of a duo were featured on the songs "Matches" and "Ricochet" a part of Too High to Riot, the second studio album by Sudanese-American Dreamville rapper Bas. The album was released on March 4th 2016. On April 15th 2016 it was announced that The Hics would be embarking on a 26 show tour of the United States with Bas.

In 2017 the duo took The Hics' second hiatus due to health and a loss in the family. They took this time to form their sound as a duo whilst working on collaborations in the background of the industry. In 2019 they had their debut album ready to release but due to the covid pandemic.

January 2021 saw The Hics collaborating with Bas once again, releasing the single "Smoke from Fire", which served as a theme song for Bas' Spotify podcast The Messenger. They also appeared on BBE's David Bowie tribute album Modern Love, in which they covered "The Man Who Sold the World".

On 21 October 2021, The Hics released their first single in seven years entitled "Caught in a Lie", which served as the lead single for their EP Harmine which was released May 6th 2022 via Bas' The Fiends imprint. The Hics and Bas released their collaborative album Melanchronica June 17th 2025. They spent the rest of 2025 living in the US and working on various projects including what will be their debut album set to release 2026.

== Members ==
- Sam Paul Evans – vocals, keyboards, electronics, production
- Rox Barker – vocals, guitar, production

Former Members

- David Turay – saxophone (2012–2014)
- Matt Knox – bass guitar (2012–2015)
- Geordan Reid-Campbell – guitar, electronics (2012–2015)
- Jacob Welsh – drums (2012–2015)

== Discography ==
- Tangle EP (2013)
- HARMINE EP (2022)
- MELANCHRONICA (2025)
