= Shmueli Ungar =

Shmueli Ungar שמילי אונגר
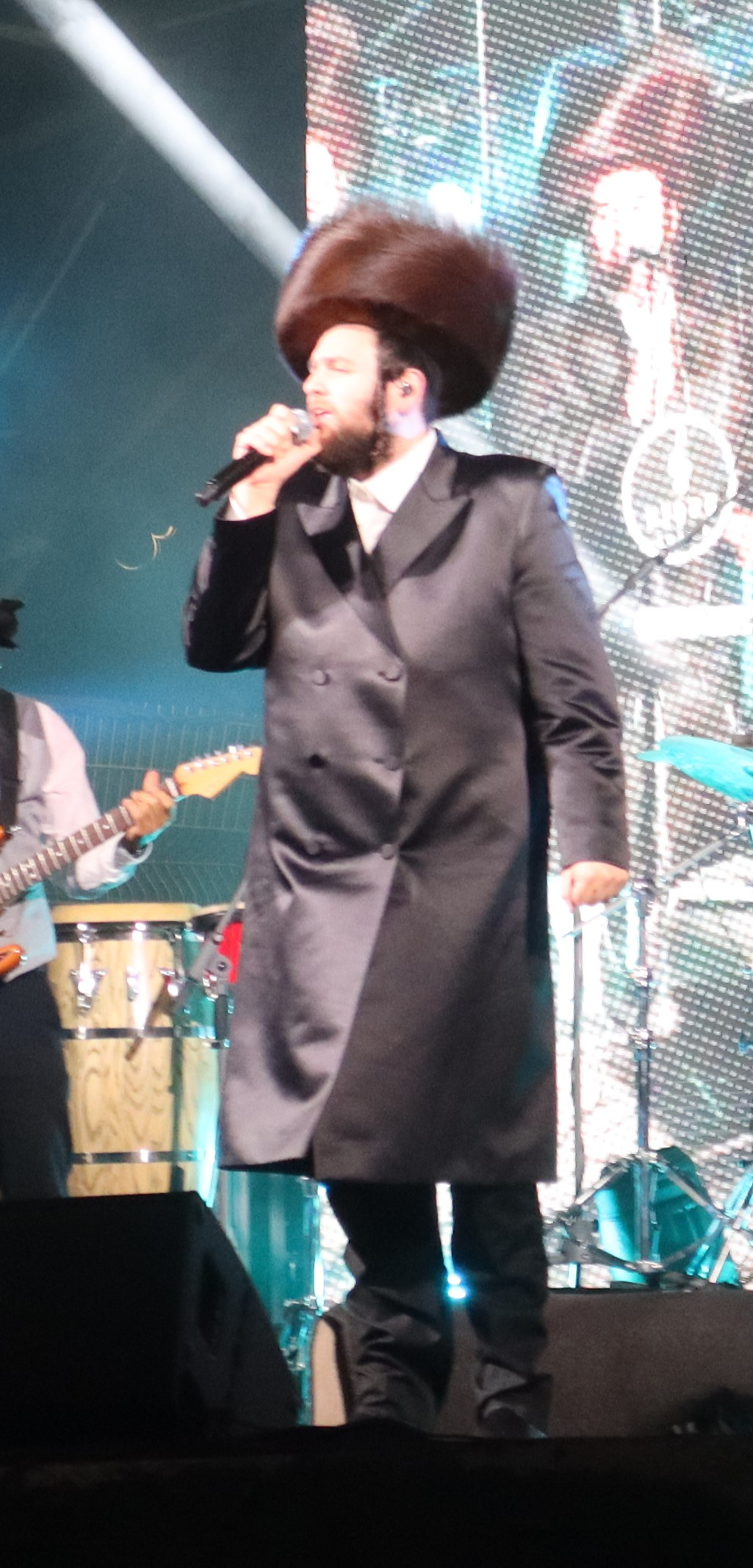
- Ungar in a concert in Beit Shemesh in 2024

Background information
- Born: 1990 (age 35–36); Kiryas Joel, New York, United States
- Genres: Jewish music
- Years active: 2016–present
- Spouse: Yiddis Lewin (m. 2016)
- Website: shmueliungar.com

Shmuel Dovid "Shmueli" Ungar (/ˈʃmɪliː/ SHMI-lee) is an American Hasidic singer, songwriter and entertainer in the contemporary Jewish religious music industry. He has released four albums, three of which charted on the Billboard World Music category.

== Early life ==
Ungar was born in 1990 in Kiryas Joel, New York, where he studied in the Satmar yeshiva. He continued to study at the Hitchin Yeshiva in London followed by a yeshiva in Monsey. He was orphaned from his father at age 14.

== Musical career ==
Ungar began his career at the wedding of his sister, at the request of his grandfather, after which he continued to perform at weddings in Williamsburg. He was originally part of Zemiros Choir, after which he switched to Shira Choir, but eventually left the group to progress his career as a solo artist. In 2016, he released his debut album, Shmueli 2. The album was produced by Naftali Schnitzler and features compositions by Moshe Laufer, Pinky Weber, Naftali Schnitzler and Yitzy Waldner, and arrangements by Moshe Laufer and Yoeli Dickman.

In August 2017, he released the song "Mach A Bracha" as a single in anticipation for his album of the same name. He also released a music video for the song, which as of February 2026, has more than 11 million views on YouTube. In 2018, he released the album Mach a Bracha. The album was produced by Naftali Schnitzler and features compositions by Pinky Weber, Beri Weber, Naftali Schnitzler and Hershy Weinberger.

In 2019, he released an album called On Stage, produced by Naftali Schnitzler, with the Hamenagnim Orchestra and Moishe Roth. The album includes over 50 wedding songs and encompasses almost an entire wedding.

Ungar then released his third album, Madreigos, which, like his first two albums, was produced by Naftali Schnitzler, this time under his House of Music Label. Most of the album's compositions were by Hershy Weinberger, although other well-known composers, such as Schnitzler and Pinky Weber, composed for the album.

Following the success of his On Stage album, he released a second album in the series in 2022 called Back Stage. The album includes 50 tracks. The album was produced by Naftali Schnitzler together with composer Hershy Weinberger, with musical arrangements by Shea Kaller.

In February 2024, he released his fourth album titled Shulem Aleichem which he produced himself and which was later voted Album of the Year 2024 by streaming app 24Six. He also released a music video for the song "Fire" which is the second song on the album. The music video has more than 640,000 views, as of February 2026

In December 2024, he released an album of popular Hanukkah songs, titled L'chaim Shmueli, with producer Yosef Moshe Kahana. The album features arrangements by Moshe Laufer and Yehuda Galili.

He also hosts a Yiddish-language podcast titled ShmueliCast, in which he hosts various Hasidic guests. Its YouTube channel has over 10,000 subscribers.

== Personal life ==
Ungar married Yiddis Lewin, of Williamsburg, New York, in November 2016 and they have two children. He is a member of the Satmar community and lives in Monroe, New York.

== Discography ==
- Shmueli 2 (2016)
- Mach a Bracha (2018)
- On Stage (2019)
- Madraigos (2020)
- Back Stage (2022)
- Shulem Aleichem (2024)
- L'chaim Shmueli (2024)

=== Singles ===
- Yishoma (2016), debut single
- Rachamana (2016)
- Mach a Bracha (2018), music video/opening song to Mach a Bracha album
- The Dreidel Song (2019)
- Kol Hamelamed (2020), produced by Chasdei Lev
- Halailah Hazeh (2020), featuring Hershy Weinberger
- Tata Mama (2022)
- D'Tzach (2022), featuring Hershy Weinberger
- Chasdei Hasem (2022)
- Tischadesh (2022), featuring Hershel Rosenberg
- Unspoken Words (2023)
- Vekarev Pezurainu (2023)
- Ready to Dance! (2024, live performance with musician Elchonon Gartenhaus)
- Hashem Needs Every Yid (2024), Oorah
- Geulah (2025)

=== Collaborations and appearances ===
- Mulei Simcha (2017), album produced by Naftali Schnitzler featuring seven vocalists including Ungar
- Bracha and Nachas (2018), together with Yiddish Nachas (produced by Moshy Kraus)
- Kilunee (2019), appearance on Fingerprints (album by Sruly Bodansky/Naftali Schnitzler)
- Simi Lev (2019), appearance on Lev el Haneshama (album by R' Chezkie Weisz/Naftali Schnitzler)
- The Plus Factor (2019) and The Plus Factor, Episode 2 (2020), music videos by Yeedle Kahan, featuring Ungar and other singers
- Bitchu Bashem (2020), with Sababa Band
- Bar Ilu (2020), single, with Ohad Moskowitz
- Halev Sheli (2021), with Sababa Band
- Lchaim and Nachas (2021), with Yaakov Shwekey
- D'Tzach (2022), with Hershy Weinberger, featuring Yoeli Klein, Shaya Gross and Naftali Schnitzler
- Va'ani Evtach Bach (2023), with Matt Dubb, featuring Beri Weber
- B'karov Mamesh (2023), with Mendy Hershkowitz Band and Lev Choir
- Zeh Hakatan (2023) appearance on Lev Chodosh (album by Baruch Levine)
- Yidden In America (live performance by the Freilach Band)
