= Moshe Weinberger =

American Hasidic rabbi

Rabbi Moshe Weinberger

Personal life
- Born: 1957 (age 68–69) Queens, New York
- Spouse: Michla Weinberger
- Parents: Mordechai Aryeh Yosef Weinberger (father); Perele Weinbeger (mother)
- Education: M.A. Jewish philosophy, Bernard Revel Graduate School of Jewish Studies, Yeshiva University; M.A. educational administration, Columbia University Teachers College

Religious life
- Religion: Judaism

Jewish leader
- Position: Rabbi
- Synagogue: Congregation Aish Kodesh
- Began: 1992
- Other: Mashpia (effectively a Mashgiach ruchani), Rabbi Isaac Elchanan Theological Seminary
- Residence: Woodmere, NY
- Semikhah: Rabbi Isaac Elchanan Theological Seminary

Rabbi Moshe Weinberger (born June 1, 1957) is an American Chasidic rabbi, educator, author, translator, and speaker. He is the founding rabbi of Congregation Aish Kodesh in Woodmere, New York, and former Mashpia/mashgiach ruchani at the Rabbi Isaac Elchanan Theological Seminary (RIETS). He has recorded more than 5000 lectures on chasidic thought and philosophy as well as Halakha (Jewish law) and a variety of other topics in Judaism.

== Early life and education ==
=== Parents and Childhood ===
Rabbi Weinberger grew up in a Modern Orthodox home in Queens, New York. His father, Mordechai Aryeh Yosef Weinberger (March 24, 1923 - February 10, 2020), and his mother, were both Holocaust survivors from Munkacs and Ungvar who went through the Nazi concentration camps, and his grandparents were Belzer Hasidim. He began studying Chasidic works after his Bar Mitzvah.

=== Semicha and Degrees ===
Although he originally planned a career in law, he discontinued his law studies to train for the rabbinate, receiving semicha (ordination as a rabbi) from RIETS, where he was a student of Rabbi Dovid Lifshitz and Rabbi Joseph B. Soloveitchik. He also studied for some time at Yeshivas Sh'or Yoshuv. He earned master's degrees in Jewish philosophy from the Bernard Revel Graduate School of Jewish Studies at Yeshiva University, and in educational administration from Columbia University Teachers College.

== Rabbinical Positions ==
=== Early career ===
Rabbi Weinberger began his career in the rabbinate as a rabbi at a yeshiva in Far Rockaway. He taught for two decades as a rabbi at Ezra Academy, a Jewish day school in Queens, New York and also served as a mashgiach ruchani for N'vei Tzion of Queens. For one year he also taught as a high school rabbi at Yeshivas Shaar Hatorah in Queens.

=== Congregation Aish Kodesh ===
In December 1992, Rabbi Weinberger became the first rabbi of Congregation Aish Kodesh in Woodmere, New York. He named the synagogue after Kalonymus Kalman Shapira, the Piaseczna Rav.

The congregation's annual hillula celebration on the yahrtzeit (death anniversary) of Shapira and on Lag BaOmer, the yahrtzeit of Rabbi Shimon bar Yochai, each draw more than 2,000 attendees.

The congregation also hosts multiple events throughout the year such as a Chanukkah Mesiba (party), Simchas Beis HaShoeivah, and Tu BiShvat.

=== Rabbi Isaac Elchanan Theological Seminary (RIETS) ===
In 2013 Rabbi Weinberger was appointed mashgiach ruchani at the Rabbi Isaac Elchanan Theological Seminary (RIETS), where he presented weekly classes in Chasidic thought and philosophy, conducted a monthly farbrengen (joyful gathering), and used to spend Shabbos on campus several times a year.

In around 2019, Rabbi Weinberger slowly started shifting out of his role at Rabbi Isaac Elchanan Theological Seminary (RIETS) to focus on opening up a kollel ("Emek Hamelech") for training people interested in rabbinical positions which focused on a combination of intense study of halacha as well as a serious focus on penimius hatorah and chassidus, which, due to a variety of factors never came to fruition.

== Path in Judaism ==
There's a certain humility I've seen among the Modern Orthodox, especially the youth . . . they are prepared to acknowledge a sense of spiritual desolation that they're experiencing. There was and still is a readiness to hear more about [God], to find out more about [God] and develop a personal relationship with Him, as opposed to just keeping a finger on the place in the Gemara and, in a more robotic way, observing the rituals of Judaism; to seek a living relationship with God.

— Rabbi Moshe Weinberger

Noting that many religious Jews may follow the letter of the law without feeling its inner joy or a personal connection with God, Rabbi Weinberger preaches the basic tenets of Chassidus to rekindle excitement and joy in Jewish observance. He places a strong emphasis on the path of ahava and not yirah in a person's personal relationship with God. He strongly encourages the learning of penimius hatorah and chassidus for people of all ages, and believes that it is an extremely important component of one developing his relationship with God. He also encourages the path of hisbodedus in which a person speaks to God in their own words with strong feelings outside of the context of the three time daily traditional Jewish prayer services.

Rabbi Weinberger has been noted as "one of this generation's leading teachers of Chassidus". His teachings derive from a wide range of sources across the hashkafic board of Judaism, including the Baal Shem Tov, Ramchal, Rebbe Nachman of Breslov, Chabad, and Izbica, Peshischa as well as from the Vilna Gaon, Rav Tzadok HaKohen, and Rabbi Avraham Yitzchok HaKohen Kook, among others. He also teaches works that were previously unavailable to the English-speaking public, such as the works of the Bilvavi Mishkan Evneh, and others To date, he has recorded over 5,000 lectures on Chasidic thought and philosophy.

== Positions on Controversial Matters ==
Rabbi Weinberger has been involved in some controversies over his years of service as a Rabbinical leader, at times disagreeing with some Rabbanim in the litvish and sephardic Jewish orthodox community who disagree with his hashkafic views on certain matters.

=== Pittsburgh Massacre ===
==== Background ====
On October 27, 2018, as religious prayer services were underway in the conservative Tree of Life synagogue in Pittsburgh, Pennsylvania, a lone gunman entered the synagogue and began indiscriminately shooting a semi-automatic rifle killing 11 worshippers and injuring 7. The attack was clearly recognized as of anti-semitic nature as shown from his social media posts before the attack and statements to the police after his arrest. In the aftermath, many leaders of the free world issued statements condemning the attacks, with the then United States President Donald J. Trump describing it as "pure evil". Many communities, cities, and sports events held vigils, memorial ceremonies and moments of silence in respect to the victims who were killed.

==== Statement from Rabbi Mordechai Aderet ====
On the day following the attack, Rabbi Mordechai Aderet (of Great Neck, New York) released a video titled "State of the Union Address" in which he stated that the reason for the terror attack was due to the bris milah of a child adopted by two gay parents which was reportedly taking place in the synagogue at that time (reported by The Advocate, later stated by the rabbi of the congregation to be false). In his speech he stated that this is the punishment of those who do the sins of the Dor HaMabul and that such is the reason why the Tree of Life synagogue, whose congregation identifies as conservative and egalitarian was specifically attacked. Additionally, in his speech he stated that he has Ruach HaKodesh, and that many great rabbis including Rabbi Chaim Kanievsky walked him to the door when he visited them as a proof that he is a great rabbi.

==== Counterstatement from Rabbi Weinberger ====
Following the release of Rabbi Aderet's video, Rabbi Weinberger recorded a shiur in which he strongly condemned Rabbi Aderet's views on the matter calling him "a messenger of the sitra achra". In the released recording, he emphasised that regardless of what they were doing at the time of the attack or their affiliation to the conservative movement of judaism, they were raised as such ("tinokos shenishba" lit. "captured babies [that were raised non-affiliated with Orthodox Judaism]") and did not know any better. He stressed that in the Holocaust there was no differentiation between Jews who openly identified as Jews and those who completely rejected it - they were all killed indiscriminately by the hands of the Nazis. He stated that no rabbi from anywhere in the world has any right to say anything about them or why they were killed, other than the fact that they were Jews, and as such, are termed "kedoshim" (lit. "holy people").

==== Support of Rabbi Weinberger's Position ====
Following the release of Rabbi Weinberger's condemnation of Rabbi Aderet's position, many Orthodox rabbis and organizations released statements backing Rabbi Weinberger's position on the matter, including:

- The Agudas Yisroel of America released a statement stating that "The murder of eleven people during a Shabbos service this morning in a Pittsburgh synagogue is a horrific tragedy and an outrage. Our deepest sympathies go out to the mourning families and friends of the victims who were targeted because they were Jews." adding that "There are simply no words of condemnation that can truly express our anguish and disgust at the perpetrator of this hate-fueled act or others like it. Any platform or group, including those on social media, that serves to stir up and metastasize bigotry and anti-Semitic hatred, needs to be called out and shut down for incitement of violence. Until all Americans confront the horror of anti-Semitism head on, our great Democracy will not have achieved its promise. May those who were injured in today’s senseless violence have a speedy and complete recovery from their wounds".
- Rabbi Yaakov Bender released a video in response to the massacre in which he stated that "we can't give an answer" and "who are you to answer - you need for that an urim vetumim... our job is to feel along and do our best to become better people".
- Rabbi Yair Hoffman released an article for Yeshiva World News (titled "Eight Things That Are Terribly Wrong With This Rabbi’s View Of The Pittsburgh Massacre", November 1, 2018) defending the position of Rabbi Weinberger stating that "Unfortunately, there are times when misguided people, even great people, say things that are fundamentally erroneous and inflammatory. This week, one such person, a Rabbi from Great Neck, released a video that went viral immediately... No one is disagreeing with the fact that proper Shabbos observance is a fundamental of Judaism and that maintaining the sacred nature of marriage and its definition is vital... [but] There is so much that is wrong with this picture that it is difficult to know where to start and one is at a loss for words. Nonetheless, the video is so disturbing that one must speak up..."
- Rabbi Yosef Yitzchok ("Y. Y.") Jacobson, a noted speaker and lecturer in the Orthodox Jewish Community released a large letter with proofs from early poskim that those killed were, in fact kedoshim.

== Works ==
In the 1980s and 1990s, Rabbi Weinberger wrote articles on issues pertaining to Orthodox practice and baalei teshuva. He was a frequent contributor to Jewish Action, published by the Orthodox Union, and the Journal of Halacha and Contemporary Society, published by the Rabbi Jacob Joseph School. In 1990 he authored the book Jewish Outreach: Halakhic Perspectives, on halakhic issues pertaining to Orthodox Jewish outreach.

Since 2011, he has produced four volumes of English translation and commentary on the Hebrew sefer Oros HaTeshuva by Rabbi Avraham Yitzchok HaKohen Kook, published under the title Song of Teshuva. In 2015 a collection of his Torah discourses at the annual hillula (Yahrzeit) of the Piaseczna Rav at Congregation Aish Kodesh was published under the title Warmed by the Fire of the Aish Kodesh. Since then, he has also published a collection of his weekly derashos (sermons) under the title Sparks from the Fire.

== Personal ==
=== Spouse ===
Rabbi Weinberger is married to Rebbetzin Michla Weinberger, daughter of Shirley Schall and Cantor Noach Schall, a noted teacher and composer of Jewish chazzanus.

=== Dress ===
Rabbi Weinberger wears a full Chasidic levush, including a rekkel and bieber hat during the week as well as a bekeshe and shtreimel on Shabbos and Yom Tov. Additionally, he also has a beard and long traditional chassidic peyos.

== Bibliography ==
=== Books ===
- Weinberger, Moshe (2023). By the Light of the Fire. Feldheim Publications. ISBN 9781680256314.
- Weinberger, Moshe (2022). In the Heart of the Fire. Feldheim Publications. ISBN 9781680255485.
- Weinberger, Moshe (2021). Field of Vision: Tu Bishvat. Feldheim Publications. ISBN 9781680251487.
- Weinberger, Moshe (2017). Sparks From the Fire: Shabbos Drashos Delivered at Kehillas Aish Kodesh. Feldheim Publications. ISBN 9781680250572.
- Weinberger, Moshe (2015). Warmed by the Fire of the Aish Kodesh: Torah from the Hilulas of Reb Kalonymus Kalman Shapira of Piaseczna. Feldheim Publications. ISBN 978-1680250220.
- Song of Teshuvah: A Commentary on Rav Avraham Yitzchak Hakohen Kook's Oros Hateshuvah. Vol. 4. Urim Publications. 2015. ISBN 978-9655242157.
- Song of Teshuva: A Commentary on Rav Avraham Yitzchak Hakohen Kook's Oros Hateshuvah. Vol. 3. Urim Publications. 2014. ISBN 978-9655241617.
- Song of Teshuva: Commentary on Rav Avraham Yitzchak Hakohen Kook's Oros Hateshuvah, Parts 8-10. Vol. 2. Urim Publications. 2012. ISBN 978-9655241259.
- Song of Teshuva: A Commentary on Rav Avraham Yitzchak Hakohen Kook's Oros Hateshuvah. Vol. 1. Penina Press. 2011. ISBN 978-1936068241.
- Jewish Outreach: Halakhic Perspectives. KTAV. 1990. ISBN 0-88125-355-3.

=== Selected articles ===
- "'Just One Thing is Missing: The Soul'". Klal Perspectives. Spring 2012.
- "Judaism: 'Talking' Points". Israel National News. 28 December 2004.
- "A Modern Experiment in Chassidus: A Long Island congregation fashions its own foray into Chassidism" (PDF). Jewish Action. 1999. Archived from the original (PDF) on 2016-09-18.
- "Beyond the River". Jewish Action. Fall 1996.
- "Prayer: Neglected Paths and Forgotten Longings". Jewish Action. Fall 1990.
- "Keeping up with the Katz's". Jewish Action. 48 (3): 10–19. 1988.
- "The Baal Teshuva and the Jewish Community: Re-entry Problems". Journal of Halacha and Contemporary Society. Fall 1987.
- "Teaching Torah to Women" (PDF). Journal of Halacha and Contemporary Society (9): 19–52. 1985. Archived from the original (PDF) on 2015-09-05.
