= Zusha (band) =

American Hasidic folk/soul band

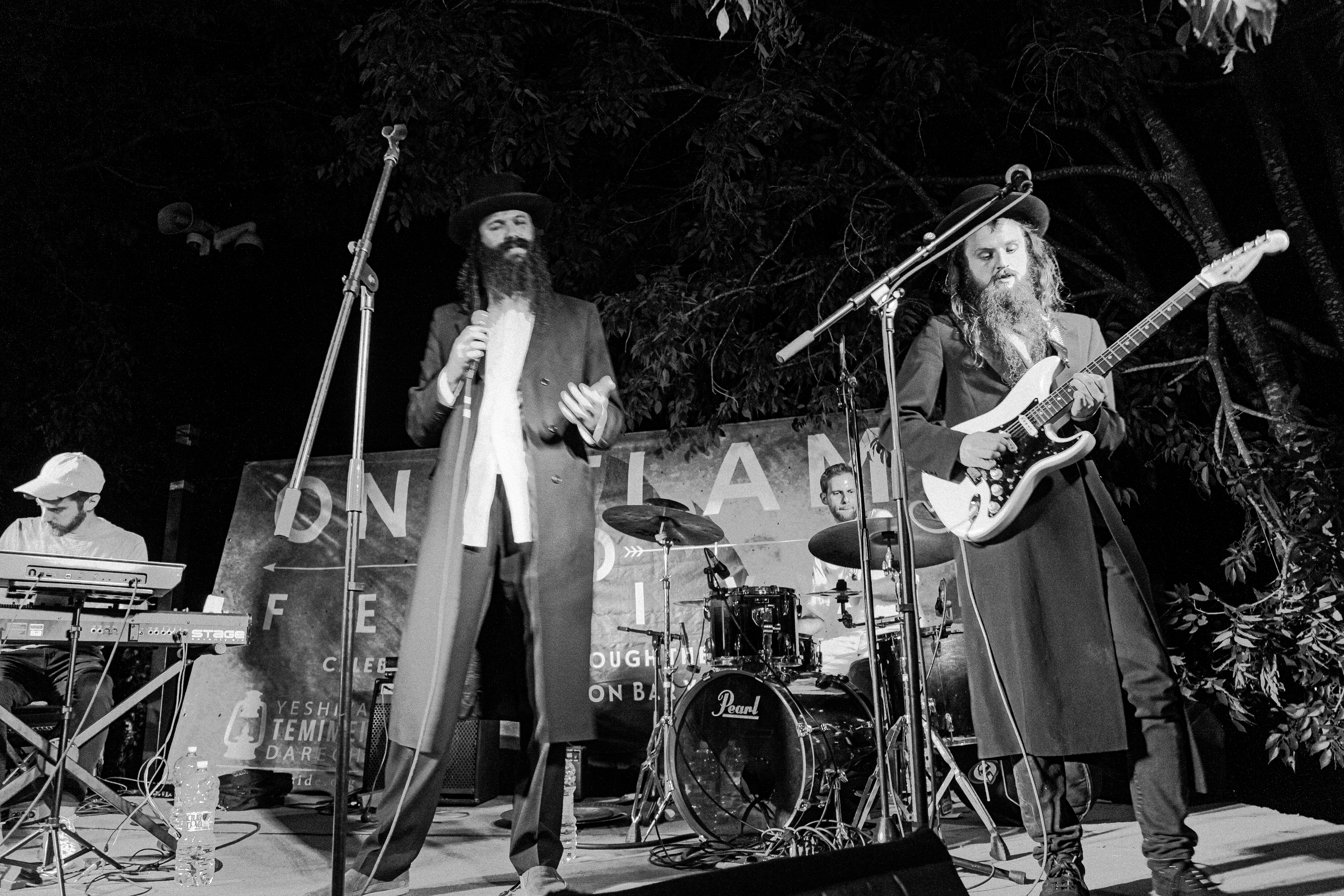
- Front Left: Shlomo Gaisin; Front Right: Zachariah Goldschmiedt

Background information
- Origin: Manhattan, New York
- Genres: Jewish rock; folk rock; nigunim; soul
- Years active: 2013–present
- Formerly of: JudaBlue, Ch!nch!lla
- Members: Shlomo Gaisin; Zachariah Goldschmiedt
- Past members: Elisha Mlotek
- Website: zusha.com

Zusha is an American Hasidic folk rock/world music band from Manhattan, New York. Formed in 2013, Zusha consists of lead vocalist Shlomo Gaisin and guitarist/vocalist Zachariah "Zack" Goldschmiedt. Their music pairs traditional Hasidic nigunim (wordless vocal melodies) with elements of folk, rock, soul, jazz, ska, and reggae. They have performed at venues including the Bowery Ballroom and the Knitting Factory. Their 2014 self-titled debut EP reached No. 9 on Billboard's World Albums chart, while their debut album Kavana (2016) reached No. 2 on the same chart. Their song "Pashut" appeared in trailers for the 2017 film Menashe, while another song, "Yoel's Nigun", was sampled by rapper JID for his 2022 single "Dance Now".

== History ==
=== Origins (2013–2014) ===
Zusha was formed in 2013 by Shlomo Gaisin, Elisha Mlotek, and Zachary Goldschmiedt. Gaisin had previously led the Jewish rock band JudaBlue, while Goldschmiedt had sung and produced for the electronic funk band Ch!nch!lla. Gaisin and Mlotek met at New York University's Chabad house, and both were later introduced to Goldschmiedt through their mutual friend and first manager Dani Bronstein. They began rehearsing in friends' apartments, recording their sessions via iPhone, until Bronstein and Rabbi Avram Mlotek encouraged them to share their music publicly.

=== Zusha EP (2014–2016) ===
Zusha's self-titled debut EP was recorded and produced by Mason Jar Music and released on October 28, 2014, two days after the band's first show at the Mercury Lounge with Levi Robin. The EP subsequently reached No. 9 on Billboard's World Albums chart. In December, they performed at the Knitting Factory and opened for Soulfarm at the Highline Ballroom. The EP features cover art by Hasidic expressionist artist Chezi Gerin.

In 2015, they gave a Purim concert with G-Nome Project at the Bowery Ballroom which featured a surprise guest appearance by Matisyahu. They played a Havdalah concert at the Atlanta Jewish Academy during the Atlanta Jewish Music Festival and also performed at the Kulturfest Yiddish Soul concert at Central Park's Rumsey Playfield, alongside Hasidic pop stars Avraham Fried and Lipa Schmeltzer, cantors Joseph Malovany and Yaakov Lemmer, and klezmer trumpeter Frank London. In May, they played at the Washington, D.C. Jewish Community Center as part of the Washington Jewish Music Festival.

=== Kavana and A Colorful World (2016–2019) ===
The band's first full-length album, Kavana, was released on January 5, 2016, and subsequently reached No. 2 on Billboard's World Albums chart. A music video directed by Joe Baughman was filmed for the song "Mashiach" and the album's song "Pashut" was featured in the trailer for the 2017 film Menashe, which premiered at the Sundance Film Festival.

A Colorful World, Zusha's second full album, was released on September 4, 2017. That same year, Elisha Mlotek left the group to pursue filmmaking.

=== When the Sea Split and Open the Gates (2019–present) ===
Zusha's third full album, When the Sea Split, released on September 1, 2019. In 2020, the now-duo were featured on the singles "Anim Zemirot" by The Portnoy Brothers and "Karvah" by Eitan Katz, and in December they released Likavod Shabbos, a collaborative EP with singer Beri Weber. Amid a string of singles, Zusha released the EP Cave of Healing on March 14, 2021. The following year, a fourth studio album, Open the Gates, was released on January 17, 2022, featuring collaborations with Eitan Katz, Ishay Ribo, and Eviatar Banai.

Later in the year, rapper JID's single "Dance Now", from his third album The Forever Story, used a sample of "Yoel's Niggun" from Zusha's debut EP. The sample was the idea of teenage producer Aviad Poznansky, who had heard the original song from a counselor at Camp Yavneh, and Gaisin, Goldschmiedt, and Mlotek are credited as writers on the JID song.

== Musical style ==
Zusha's music combines the wordless vocals and improvised nature of traditional Hasidic nigunim with elements of folk, rock, soul, jazz, funk, reggae, ska, and EDM. Reviewing a 2014 concert for Tablet, Hillel Broder noted the band's jazz-influenced scales and use of reggae and surf rock rhythms. The St. Louis Jewish Light quoted a description of their 2016 album Kavana as "Beirut, Bon Iver and Sufjan Stevens meet the Crosby, Stills and Nash of Hasidic music". The band themselves have cited influences including Shlomo Carlebach, Bob Dylan, early Matisyahu, Damian Marley, Shlomo Katz, and Yosi Piamenta. In an interview for their 2019 album When the Sea Split, Gaisin noted that they had shifted from wordless nigunim towards more lyrical songs.

Speaking to HuffPost in 2014, Jon Stratton, a Curtin University professor and scholar of Jewish-American music, described the band as "part of a new Jewish tradition that affirms Jewish and especially Judaic life in the diaspora while utilizing elements of the local, here American, musical tradition".

=== Hasidic influence ===
The band is often associated with Hasidic Judaism and attribute much of their inspiration to the texts of the Baal Shem Tov and his students' teachings. Early in their career, the band were frequently associated with Neo-Hasidism and the Hasidic hipster movement; the band has rejected both labels, arguing their music was a return to the origins of Hasidism rather than a new interpretation. They have also shied away from being labeled as a Jewish band or religious music, hoping instead to appeal to a more universal audience.

== Members ==
=== Current ===
- Shlomo Gaisin – lead vocals (2013–present)
- Zachariah Goldschmiedt – guitar, producer, vocals (2013–present)

=== Touring ===
- Chemy Soibelman – drums (2018–2023)

=== Former ===
- Elisha Mlotek – percussion, vocals (2013–2017)

== Discography ==
The band has released four studio albums and three EPs.

=== Studio albums ===
Year	Title	Peak chart positions	
Year	Title	World Albums	Heatseekers Albums
2016	Kavana	2	15
2017	A Colorful World	–	–
2019	When the Sea Splits	–	–
2022	Open the Gates	–	–

=== Extended plays ===
Year	Title	Peak chart positions
Year	Title	World Albums
2014	Zusha	9
2018	Likavod Shabbos (with Beri Weber)	–
2021	Cave of Healing	–

=== Compilation appearances ===
- 2019: Various, Only You – "All Worlds" (album produced by Congregation Aish Kodesh)
- 2021: Various, Mevakshei Hashem – "Mi LaShem Elai" (album produced by Thank You Hashem)

=== Singles as lead artist ===
Year	Title	Album	Notes
2014	"Yoel's Niggun"	Zusha	
2014	"Brother" (ft. C Lanzbom)	non-album single	
2016	"Mashiach"	Kavana	
2017	"Modeh"	non-album single	
2017	“Baruch Hashem” (ft. Pumpidisa, Matt Dubb)	non-album single	
2017	"King"	A Colorful World	
2018	"Hatikvah"	A Colorful World	
2019	"Reb Shayaleh"	non-album single	
2019	"The Seder Song"	non-album single	
2019	"Ad Shetehe"	When the Sea Splits	
2019	"Wonders"	When the Sea Splits	
2020	"Basi Legani (Live)"	non-album single	
2020	"Kadshaynu"	non-album single	
2020	"Hodu Lashem (Live)"	non-album single	
2020	"Merci"	non-album single	
2020	"Tuv Ta'am (Live)"	non-album single	
2020	"Biglal Avos"	Cave of Healing	
2020	"Lema'an Achai"	Cave of Healing	
2020	"Chanukah is Here"	non-album single	Promotional Hanukkah song for the organization Thank You Hashem.
2020	"Eilecha"	Cave of Healing	
2020	"Adon Olam"	Cave of Healing	
2021	"Eliyahu"	Cave of Healing	
2021	"Mishenichnas Adar"	non-album single	Purim single
2021	"Nirtza"	non-album single	
2022	"Hareini Mechavein"	Open the Gates	
2024	”Brighter”	non-album single	

=== Singles as featured artist ===
Year	Song
2020	"Anim Zemirot" (Portnoy Brothers ft. Zusha)
2020	"Karvah" (Eitan Katz ft. Zusha)

== Music videos ==
Year	Title	Director
2016	"Mashiach"	Joe Baughman
2016	"V'Shamru (Joshua Tree Part I)"	Ora Dekornfeld
2016	"Dov Ber (Joshua Tree Part II)"	Ora Dekornfeld
2017	"Baruch Hashem" (ft. Pumpidisa, Matt Dubb)	Joseph Shidler & Mendy Mish
2017	"King"	Jacob Blumberg & Bianca Giaever
2018	"Hatikvah"	Shimmy Socol
2019	"Ad Shetehe"	Emad Rashidi
2019	"Wonders"	Emad Rashidi
2020	"Basi Legani (Live)"	Ora Dekornfeld
2020	"Hodu Lashem (Live)"	Ora Dekornfeld
2020	"Tuv Ta'am (Live)"	Ora Dekornfeld
2020	"Chanukah is Here"	Shimmy Socol
2021	"Mishenichnas Adar"	Shimmy Socol
2021	"Reb Shayaleh"	Shimmy Socol
2022	"Hareini Mechavein"	Jon Seale
