= Avram Mlotek =

Rabbi, social media personality, writer, and actor

Rabbi Avram Mlotek

Personal life
- Born: 1987 (age 38–39) Manhattan, New York City, New York, United States

Religious life
- Religion: Judaism

Jewish leader
- Semikhah: Yeshivat Chovevei Torah

Avram Mlotek (Yiddish: אברהם מלאטעק; born 1987) is an American rabbi, author, singer and spiritual activist. Mlotek is the co-founder of Base, a pluralistic home-centered outreach program, established established in twelve cities worldwide, predominantly for Jewish young adults.

== Early life ==
Avram Mlotek was born in 1987, in Manhattan, New York. His father, Zalmen Mlotek, is the artistic director of the National Yiddish Theatre Folksbiene; and his mother, Debra (nee Cohen) is an occupational therapist. He is the grandson of Joseph Mlotek and Eleanor Mlotek (nee Gordon). He grew up in the Riverdale neighborhood of the Bronx, and also in Teaneck, New Jersey. Mlotek's younger brother Elisha Mlotek is a filmmaker and founding member of the Hasidic jam band Zusha. Mlotek was influential in encouraging his younger brother to share his group's music with a wider audience

== Education ==
Mlotek received his BA in Near Eastern and Judaic Studies from Brandeis University in 2009. During his undergraduate career at Brandeis he contributed to organizations that addressed ethical issues as a Sorensen Fellow, in 2008. He received rabbinic ordination from Yeshivat Chovevei Torah Rabbinical School in 2015. He also holds a Masters of Social Work from Fordham University.

In the course of his education Mlotek studied theatre at Sarah Lawrence College, Islamic Scriptures at Bergen Community College, cantorial music at Yeshiva University, Talmud at Yeshivat Hadar, theater education at City College, and clinical pastoral education at The Jewish Theological Seminary of America.

== Career and social activism ==
To combat the rise of antisemitism in the United States after the 2016 U.S. presidential election, Mlotek traveled to sites of various anti-Semitic events in an attempt to raise awareness against antisemitism and offer spiritual support and prayer for survivors and affected communities. He has published his experiences in Paris, Pittsburgh, Philadelphia and Manhattan in various news articles. Mlotek himself was a victim of antisemitism by a Farrakhan supporter on a subway train during his travels in Manhattan.

Mlotek announced in 2019 he would officiate same-gender civil marriage ceremonies for Jewish couples. Orthodox Judaism erusin and kiddushin (Orthodox Jewish marital rituals) precludes same-gender unions through kiddushin and Mlotek officiated a civil ceremony for a same-gender Jewish couple in 2020 and continues to perform religious ceremonies for queer Jewish couples.

Mlotek advocates for greater inclusion of multi-faith families and other marginalized populations within Judaism.

On September 4, 2016, Mlotek co-officiated a wedding ceremony with Associate Justice of the Supreme Court of the United States, Ruth Bader Ginsburg. He used this public platform to advocate for greater gender equality within Orthodox Judaism Mlotek claimed "privileged" men such as rabbis must advocate for equality between the genders within Orthodox Judaism.

Mlotek was listed as one of America's "Most Inspiring Rabbis" by The Forward in 2016. He was named a "leading innovator in Jewish life" by the Jewish Week's 36 Under 36 Section.

== Media and performance ==
Mlotek has authored five books: Why Jews Do That or 30 Questions Your Rabbi Never Answered in 2020 (Skyhorse), Passover in a Pandemic (Ben Yehuda), Butterfly (Archway), The Torah of Social Media (Koehler) and My Yiddish Alphabet (Olympia). His writing has been published in various outlets, including The New York Times, The Wall Street Journal, The Los Angeles Times, The New York Daily News, The Forward, Haaretz, Tablet and The New York Jewish Week.

Mlotek has performed on the Yiddish stage since the age of three, most notably in the National Yiddish Theatre Folksbiene's Off-Broadway Family show, Kids and Yiddish, in which he appeared for several seasons and is featured on their original cast album, Kids and Yiddish, A Musical Adventure.

Mlotek performed vocals for the documentary "Harbor From the Holocaust," featuring world renowned Cellist Yo-Yo Ma. Mlotek performed for several Klezmer CDs including The Klezmatics, Oy Vey Chanukah for Kids, Di Grine Katchke, and others.

Mlotek has also performed in staged readings for the National Yiddish Theatre-Folksbiene including Chaim Grade's My Mother's Sabbath Days, H. Leyvick's The Wedding in Fernvald, H. Leyvick's The Miracle of the Ghetto and Paddy Chayefsky's The Tenth Man (in Yiddish).

In April 2020 during COVID-19, Mlotek organized The Third Seder, An Online International Celebration of Yiddish Culture which featured some of the leading Klezmer performing artists in a benefit program for The United Community Services of Westchester.

In October 2020, Mlotek co-directed and produced Kids and Yiddish: The Reunion Special, along with brother Elisha Mlotek for The National Yiddish Theatre Folksbiene.

In March 2021, Mlotek organized the second annual The Third Seder, A Yiddish Passover Celebration through the Marlene Meyerson JCC Manhattan with lead sponsorship from The National Yiddish Theatre Folksbiene. It was also co-sponsored by over 20 Yiddish cultural organizations, with 30 participants from across the globe.

Mlotek has authored the book "Why Jews Do That or 30 Questions Your Rabbi Never Answered" in 2020. His writing has been published in various outlets, including The New York Times, The Los Angeles Times, The New York Daily News, The Forward, Haaretz, Tablet and The New York Jewish Week.

Mlotek performed vocals for the documentary "Harbor From the Holocaust," featuring world renowned Cellist Yo-Yo Ma. Mlotek performed for several Klezmer CDs including The Klezmatics, Oy Vey Chanukah for Kids, Di Grine Katchke, and others.

Mlotek has recently published the book "Passover in a Pandemic" (Ben Yehuda 2021).

In 2023, Mlotek co-created Amid Falling Walls (Tsvishn Falndike Vent) with his father, Yiddish music director Zalmen Mlotek. The musical revue, produced by the National Yiddish Theatre Folksbiene at the Museum of Jewish Heritage in New York City, draws on Yiddish songs and poetry written and performed by Jews during the Holocaust, including material from ghettos, concentration camps, cabarets, partisan encampments, and clandestine theaters. Mlotek wrote the libretto and curated the material, while Zalmen Mlotek curated and arranged the music. The production premiered in November 2023 and received the 2024 Drama Desk Award for Outstanding Revue. In May 2024, Amid Falling Walls was presented in Bucharest, Romania, as an international co-production of the National Yiddish Theatre Folksbiene and Romania's State Jewish Theatre as part of TES FEST, the International Yiddish Theatre Festival. In 2026, the work was adapted for the PBS program House Seats.
