= The Forever Story =

Studio album by JID
- Released: August 26, 2022
- Recorded: 2020–2022
- Studio: Blue Room Studios
- Genres: Southern hip-hop; conscious hip-hop; alternative hip-hop; R&B; trap; jazz rap
- Length: 66:32
- Labels: Dreamville; Interscope
- Producers: 2One2; Aviad; BadBadNotGood; Benji; Cardiak; Childish Major; Christo; DJ Khalil; DJ Scheme; E. Jones; Elite; Groove; Hero the Band; Hollywood Cole; James Blake; JD Beck; Kaytranada; Khrysis; Monte Booker; Nami; Nonstop da Hitman; Nuri; Pluss; QRiley; Tane Runo; Tommy Brown; Tu!; Yuli

JID chronology
Spilligion (2020)	The Forever Story (2022)	God Does Like Ugly (2025)

Singles from The Forever Story
- 1. "Surround Sound" Released: January 14, 2022; 2. "Dance Now" Released: August 9, 2022

The Forever Story is the third studio album by American rapper JID. It was released on August 26, 2022, through Dreamville and Interscope Records. Recorded over a two-year period, the album features introspective lyricism showcasing JID's upbringing. The album incorporates R&B, alternative hip hop, and trap. The album features guest appearances from Kenny Mason, EarthGang, 21 Savage, Baby Tate, Lil Durk, Ari Lennox, Yasiin Bey, Lil Wayne, Johntá Austin, Ravyn Lenae, and Eryn Allen Kane. Production was handled by a variety of record producers, including Monte Booker, Childish Major, Christo, Cardiak, Kaytranada, DJ Scheme, Khrysis, and James Blake, among others. The album serves as the follow-up to JID's second studio album, DiCaprio 2 (2018) as well as Spilligion (2020), his collaboration album with Spillage Village and EarthGang.

The Forever Story was met with critical acclaim upon its release, in which critics praised the album for its ambition, lyrical content and introspective writing. It debuted at number twelve on Billboard 200 chart. The album was supported by two singles: "Surround Sound" and "Dance Now", as well as the promotional single "2007".

== Background ==
The Forever Story was a highly anticipated project, as it marks JID's first solo output in almost four years, since the critically acclaimed DiCaprio 2 was released in 2018. Our Generation Music wrote: "With a forthcoming album that's been in the works for nearly a half decade, fans could ironically call the wait for JID's next project 'The Forever Story.'" The album was originally titled God Does Like Ugly and intended for release in late 2020.

Conceptually, The Forever Story is a sequel to JID's debut album, The Never Story, released in 2017. The title is a direct reference to the 2017 album's title, and the artwork alludes to the 2017 album's artwork. The artwork depicts the rapper "standing in the middle of a crowd containing people from all walks of life", capturing "the different realities Black people face in America."

== Recording and production ==
In March 2020, JID began working on the album at the Spillage Village studio house in Atlanta with members of the group expected make appearances. However, due to the COVID-19 pandemic, they decided to record collectively for the album Spilligion. In an interview with, he told Billboard, "This next album [The Forever Story] is the best shit I've ever done in my life. Every step I've taken was worth it, and our blocks are building."

The album was executive produced by Barry "Hefner" Johnson, JID, and Christo. The production was mainly handled by Christo, Monte Booker, Kaytranada, James Blake, Thundercat, DJ Khalil, Childish Major, Groove, Tommy Brown and Cardiak, among others.

== Promotion and release ==
JID began teasing his third studio album in 2019 through use of social media, but promotion did not begin until January 2022, when the lead single, "Surround Sound", was released. During his performance at Coachella in April 2022, he told the crowd he would announce the album release date during another performance the next week; however, he never ended up doing it. On August 9, 2022, he unveiled the album artwork and revealed that it would be released on August 26. A second single from the album, "Dance Now", was also released the same day. On August 19, JID released "2007"—a song which was originally meant to serve as the album's outro, but could not be included in the end due to problems with sample clearance—exclusively through YouTube. On August 22, he revealed the album tracklist, consisting of fifteen tracks. Two days before the release, JID hosted a promotional scavenger hunt event in three different US cities; he instructed fans that those who are able to locate a Pontiac G6, a car JID used to own, would get to hear the album early. The album was officially released on August 26, 2022.

On November 3, 2022, an extended version of the album featuring the song "2007" as an outro was released.

== Music and lyrical themes ==
Prior to the release, JID commented on the album's themes and creation process: "Initially I wanted to create an album that serves as an origin story and speaks to who I am and what I came from. [...] This has been the heaviest project for me to make and I take pride in my vulnerability that came in the midst of creation." In an interview with Complex, JID spoke on why he wanted to include personal family stories in the album saying:

[My family] is basically a part of how I became who I am. It gives inklings of why my [mindset] is a certain type of way. I gave more detail and in-depth stories [on this album], but there's still more layers to be peeled back, which I am going to do because this is going to be a long process of trying to understand me. This is just a good piece of the origin story, and this is me finding that space to be more visible and present with words.

The original outro for the album, "2007", is a narrative-driven song that tells the story of JID's upbringing and college experience from an aspiring football player to a rapper. JID highlighted release dates of several albums as checkpoints to depict critical moments in his life, such as J. Cole's The Come Up, The Warm Up, and Cole World: The Sideline Story, Kendrick Lamar's Section.80, and his debut The Never Story. The song also includes skits from his father talking about when he found out JID was kicked out of college and decided to pursue rapping, and J. Cole telling the story about how they met and when he decided to sign him to Dreamville.

== Critical reception ==
Professional ratings
Aggregate scores
Source	Rating
Metacritic	83/100
Review scores
Source	Rating
AllMusic	4.5/5 stars
Clash	8/10
Sputnikmusic	4.6/5
Pitchfork	7.3/10

The Forever Story was met with critical acclaim upon its release. At Metacritic, which assigns a normalised rating out of 100 to reviews from mainstream publications, the album received an average score of 83, based on 6 reviews, indicating "universal acclaim".

Ben Broyd of Clash praised the album, saying "JID's latest release is a wonderful insight into the rapper's formative years, and ultimately through the introspective manner allows for an enthralling listen. Through 'The Forever Story' JID has claimed his seat at the prestigious table of Atlantan greats". Writing for Pitchfork, Dylan Green called it "a sprawling and sometimes frustrating bridge between JID's upbringing and his place within hip-hop canon and Black history at large". In an anonymously written assessment for AllMusic, the reviewer claimed that it was "an album every bit as ambitious and monumental as the two solo studio outings that preceded it" and felt it demonstrated that JID was, "growing in terms of technical talent while also opening up more lyrically."

== Track listing ==
The Forever Story track listing
No.	Title	Writer(s)	Producer(s)	Length
1.	"Galaxy"	Destin Route; Ahmanti Booker	Monte Booker	0:52
2.	"Raydar"	Route; Asheton Hogan; Gary Fountaine; Markus Randle; John Welch; Jesse Gumer; James Icart; Jalal Mansur Nuriddin	Pluss; Nonstop da Hitman; Childish Major; Christo; 2One2; QRiley	3:24
3.	"Dance Now" (with Kenny Mason)	Route; Edwin Green, Jr.; J. Welch; Aviad Poznansky; Shlomo Gaisin; Zachary Goldschmiedt; Elisha Mlotek	Christo; Aviad	3:47
4.	"Crack Sandwich"	Route; J. Welch; Thomas Brown; Dylan Teixeira; Carl McCormick; Benjamin Tolbert	Tommy Brown; Nami; Cardiak; Groove; Christo	4:57
5.	"Can't Punk Me" (with EarthGang)	Route; Olu Fann; Eian Parker; Louis Celestin; James Beck	Kaytranada; JD Beck	3:23
6.	"Surround Sound" (featuring 21 Savage and Baby Tate)	Route; Shéyaa Bin Abraham-Joseph; Tate Farris; Gabriel Guerra; Nuri Saberin; J. Welch; Charles Singleton; Eddie Snyder	DJ Scheme; Nurі; Christo	3:49
7.	"Kody Blu 31"	Route; Justin Barnett; Jerramy Barnett; DJ Barnett; Nick Barnett; J. Welch; Ian Welch; Margaux Whitney; Taji Ausar	Christo; Benji; Yuli; Tane Runo	3:44
8.	"Bruddanem" (featuring Lil Durk)	Route; Durk Banks; Khalil Abdul-Rahman; Neal H. Pogue II; J. Welch; Whitney; Daniel Seeff	DJ Khalil; Tu!; Christo; Yuli^{[a]}	3:55
9.	"Sistanem"	Route; Kameron Cole; J. Welch; Taalib Johnson; Osunlade; Eric Roberson; James Blake Litherland	Hollywood Cole; Christo; Yuli	6:09
10.	"Can't Make U Change" (with Ari Lennox)	Route; Courtney Salter; Anthony Parrino; J. Welch; Jorge Cardoso Augusto; Alexander Joseph Hall; Quincy Jones; Leon Ware; Bruce Fisher; Stanley Richardson	Elite; Christo; AJ Hall^{[c]}; Cardoso^{[c]}; Feliciano Ecar Ponce^{[c]}; Harissis Tsakmaklis^{[c]}; Luzian Tuetsch^{[c]}	4:48
11.	"Stars" (featuring Yasiin Bey)	Route; Yasiin Bey; Ausar; Chester Hansen; Matthew Tavares; Alexander Sowinski; Eric Jones; J. Welch	BadBadNotGood; E. Jones; Christo	4:18
12.	"Just in Time" (with Kenny Mason featuring Lil Wayne)	Route; Dwayne Carter; Green; Booker; J. Welch	Booker; Christo	3:27
13.	"Money"	Route; Christopher Tyson; Paul Coleman	Khrysis	4:26
14.	"Better Days" (featuring Johntá Austin)	Route; Johntá Austin; J. Welch; I. Welch; Justin Barnett; Jerramy Barnett; D. Barnett; N. Barnett	Christo; Benji; Hero the Band	4:14
15.	"Lauder Too" (featuring Ravyn Lenae and Eryn Allen Kane)	Route; Ravyn Lenae Washington; Litherland; Tolbert; Booker; Leon Sylvers; Edmund Sylvers	James Blake; Groove^{[a]}; Booker^{[a]}	3:53
Total length:				59:06

Extended version
No.	Title	Writer(s)	Producer(s)	Length
16.	"2007"	Route; Tolbert; Dorcas Cochran; Eddie Jones; George Kerr; Gerald Harris; Gerry McClelland; J. Welch; Latrell Jaimz Boyd; Lionel Newman	Latrell James; Christo; Groove	7:26
Total length:				66:32

Notes

- ^{^[c]} signifies a co-producer
- ^{^[a]} signifies an additional producer
- "2007" features uncredited vocals by J. Cole, Ibrahim 'Ib' Hamad, and Carl Louis Route Jr.

Sample credits

- "Raydar" contains a sample from "Mean Machine", written by Jalal Mansur Nuriddin, as performed by The Last Poets.
- "Dance Now" contains a sample from "Yoel's Niggun", written by Shlomo Gaisin, Zachary Goldschmiedt, and Elisha Mlotek, as performed by Zusha.
- "Crack Sandwich" contains a sample from "Bliss", written and performed by Pete La Roca; and an interpolation of "Party Up (Up in Here)", written by Earl Simmons and Kasseem Dean, as performed by DMX.
- "Surround Sound" contains samples from "One Step Ahead", written by Charles Singleton and Eddie Snyder, as performed by Aretha Franklin.
- "Kody Blu 31" contains a sample from "Funky Fanfare", written and performed by Keith Mansfield.
- "Sistanem" contains a sample from "Mary Go Round", written by Taalib Johnson, Osunlade, and Eric Roberson, as performed by Musiq Soulchild.
- "Can't Make U Change" contains a sample from "Body Heat", written by Quincy Jones, Leon Ware, Bruce Fisher, and Stanley Richardson, as performed by Jones.
- "Money" contains a sample from "I'd Like to Know You Better", written by Paul Coleman, as performed by Rasputin Stash.
- "Lauder Too" contains a sample from "Forever Yours", written by Leon Sylvers III and Edmund Sylvers, as performed by The Sylvers.
- "2007" contains a sample from "Let's Prove Them Wrong", written by Eddie Jones and George Kerr, as performed by Debbie Taylor; a sample from "Again", written by Dorcas Cochran and Lionel Newman, as performed by Doris Day; a sample from "Come, Listen to Me", written and performed by Gerry McClelland; and a sample from "HiiiPower", written by Kendrick Duckworth, Herbert Stevens, and Jermaine Cole, as performed by Kendrick Lamar. (Note: This sample is only heard on the YouTube version of "2007" due to sampling issues.)

== Personnel ==
Musicians

- JID – vocals
- Reggie Ball Sr – additional vocals (track 1)
- Benji – background vocals (1, 2, 7), additional vocals (9, 11), bass guitar (7)
- Asiahn – background vocals (1)
- Eryn Allen Kane – background vocals (1), additional vocals (15)
- Fousheé – background vocals (3), additional vocals (9)
- Jesse Royal – spoken word (3)
- Bas – additional vocals (4)
- Christo – additional vocals (4), drums (7)
- Yuli – additional vocals (4)
- JD Beck – drums (5)
- Jean – additional vocals (7, 9, 11)
- Sheed – additional vocals (7, 9–11)
- Barbara Wilson – additional vocals (7)
- Hero the Band – additional vocals (7)
- Olu – additional vocals (7)
- Vonda Fuller – additional vocals (7, 10)
- Mustafa the Poet – spoken word (8)
- Justine Skye – additional vocals (9)
- Tane Runo – additional vocals (11)
- Emma Hathaway Delhomme – additional vocals (13)
- Kaden Chea – additional vocals (13)
- Maddison Williams – additional vocals (13)
- Randall Smith – additional vocals (13)
- Sunshine Hathaway Delhomme – additional vocals (13)
- Andrew Barnes – bass guitar (13)
- Jonathan Curry – drums (13)
- Russel Favret – guitar (13)
- Howard "GiveEmSoul" Joyner – keyboards (13)
- Juran Ratchford – saxophone (13)
- Cameron Tripp – trumpet (13)
- Angel White – additional vocals (14)
- Ravyn Lenae – additional vocals (15)
- Thundercat – bass guitar (15)

Technical

- Nicolas "Dep" de Porcel – mastering
- Derek "MixedByAli" Ali – mixing
- Cyrus "NOIS" Taghipour – mixing (6), mixing assistance (1–5, 7–16)
- John Kadadu – engineering
- Curtis "Sircut" Bye – mixing assistance

== Charts ==
Chart performance for The Forever Story
Chart (2022–2024)	Peak position
Australian Albums (ARIA)	42
Belgian Albums (Ultratop Flanders)	65
Dutch Albums (Album Top 100)	59
Irish Albums (Official Charts)	50
Lithuanian Albums (AGATA)	46
New Zealand Albums (RMNZ)	16
Swiss Albums (Schweizer Hitparade)	69
UK Albums (Official Charts)	74
UK R&B Albums (Official Charts)	36
US Billboard 200	12
