= Howard Apfel =

American-Israeli rabbi

- Education: Columbia University Medical Center.
- Occupation: Rabbi Cardiologist

Howard Apfel is an American-Israeli rabbi and cardiologist practicing medicine at Columbia University Medical Center.

== Background ==
Apfel is a board certified pediatric cardiologist at Columbia University Medical Center and Senior RA"M at Yeshivat Mevaseret Tzion. Previously, Apfel was maggid shiur in Yeshivat Shaalvim in Nof Ayalon, Israel, Yeshivat Torat Shraga and at the University of Pennsylvania. Apfel has taught bioethics courses at the Yeshiva University Gruss Kollel in Jerusalem, at Touro College Landers College for Men and has given a shiur on Hilchot Shabbat as it relates to physicians at the Montefiore Health System Albert Einstein College of Medicine. Apfel has published extensively on contemporary halacha related articles, focusing on modern issues in Jewish medical ethics.

== Education ==
Apfel received his BA degree from Columbia University in 1985, and his medical degree summa cum laude from the State University of New York, Downstate in 1989. Apfel completed his residency at Schneider Children’s Hospital. He also completed a fellowship in pediatric cardiology at the Babies and Children’s Hospital of Columbia Presbyterian Medical Center, specializing in congenital heart disease. He received rabbinic ordination from the Rabbi Isaac Elchanan Theological Seminary in 2003.

== Recognition ==
Apfel was cited in New York and New Jersey's Top Doctor edition in 2009, 2012-2024 as one of the top pediatric cardiologists in New Jersey. He was also ranked as the 2nd best cardiologist in New Jersey by the Jewish Standard.

== Awards ==
Apfel has received many awards during his years of practicing medicine. The following is a chronological list of his awards:

- 1986, McGraw-Hill Award for Outstanding Academic Achievement
- 1987, Lange Award for Outstanding Academic Achievement
- 1987, Alpha Omega Alpha Honor Medical Society
- 1988, New York Academy of Medicine Award for Significant Achievement in the Field of Cardiovascular Medicine and Overall Academic Excellence
- 1988, Lange Award for Outstanding Academic Achievement
- 1989, Sandoz Award for Academic Excellence
- 1990, Samuel Karelitz Intern of the Year Award for Clinical Acumen, Diligence and Humanity
- 1992, Stanley Levin Resident Teaching Award for Clinical Expertise and Teaching Commitment
- 1994, Hatch Young Investigators Award for Cardiovascular
- Top Pediatric Cardiologist in New Jersey (New Jersey Record Top Doctors Edition)

== Publications and articles ==
Apfel has been published in a number of periodicals. He has written for the Journal of Halacha and Contemporary Society and Tradition: The Journal of Orthodox Jewish Thought. He was also a Senior mentor and writer for the Albert Einstein College of Medicine Synagogue Compendium Of Torah and Medicine. In addition, has written over 20 articles for various peer reviewed medical journals.

- Fetal intervention: Halacha's response to a new bioethical dilemma. (Journal of Halacha and Contemporary Society)
- Halachic and Medical perspectives of Banking Umbilical Cord Stem Cells. (Journal of Halacha and Contemporary Society)
- Life Saving Duties on Shabbat: Switching Call with a Non-Observant Jew. (Journal of Halacha and Contemporary Society)
- Reading Options on Shabbat. (Journal of Halacha and Contemporary Society)
- Verapo Yerapeh: Diverse Approaches to the License to Heal. (Albert Einstein College of Medicine Synagogue Compendium Of Torah and Medicine)
- Hashkafic Divergence in Contemporary Orthodoxy: Nekudat ha-Mahloket. (Tradition: The Journal of Orthodox Jewish Thought)
- Pulmonary position cryopreserved homografts: durability in pediatric Ross and non-Ross patients. (The Journal of Thoracic and Cardiovascular Surgery)
- Comparison of three-dimensional echocardiographic assessment of volume, mass, and function in children with functionally single left ventricles with two-dimensional echocardiography and magnetic resonance imaging. (American Journal of Cardiology)
- Noncardiac chest pain and psychopathology in children and adolescents. (Journal of Psychosomatic Research)
- Late Left Ventricular Function After Surgery for Children With Chronic Symptomatic Mitral Regurgitation. (American Heart Association)
