= Matt Dubb =

- Born: Lakewood, New Jersey, U.S.
- Other names: MŪNTII
- Occupations: DJ; producer; songwriter; entrepreneur
- Years active: 2015–present

Motti Weiss, better known by his stage name Matt Dubb, is an American Jewish music producer, composer, and arranger. He is known for his work in both the Hasidic music scene and internationally under a different stage name, MŪNTII, where he has gained recognition for his electronic music.

== Early life and career ==
Dubb was born and raised in Lakewood, New Jersey. His father founded the synagogue Kol Shimshon, one of the largest synagogues in Lakewood. Dubb began his musical career at the age of 17, forming a wedding orchestra called EvanAl. He released his first single, Ben Fayga, with Lipa Schmeltzer.

== Hasidic music career ==
Dubb quickly gained recognition for his work in Hasidic music, composing and arranging for various artists. He achieved success with his album Be Positive together with Lipa Schmeltzer in 2015, which included hits Bueh Bueh and Nakdishoch. In 2022, he released the song L'chai Oilamim with Mordechai Shapiro and Benny Friedman. The song reached the top three on several Israeli year-end charts and was praised by critics for its catchy melody and energetic music video.

== International career ==
In 2021, Dubb signed with Dutch record label Armada Music under his stage name MŪNTII. He released the single Unstoppable with Alex Clare in 2023, which further solidified his presence in the international electronic music scene.

== Other ventures ==
Alongside his musical career, Dubb is also the owner of a financial company that provides credit to employers.

== Discography ==
Albums

- Be Positive – with Lipa Schmeltzer, 2015

Singles

- Sababa, 2017
- Adama V'Shamayim, 2018
- Olam Chesed, 2019
- Tzur, 2020
- Achshav, 2021
- Anachnu Ma'aminim, 2023

Collaborations

- Baruch Hashem – with Zusha and Pumpidisa, 2017
- Heilig – with Mendy Worch, 2018
- Simcha – with Soulja, 2018
- Eliyahu Hanavi – with Menachem Weinstein, 2018
- Aifo – with Beri Weber and Chaim Yisrael, 2019
- Kuili – with Shloime Daskal, 2019
- Ana – with Itzik Dadya, 2020
- Lchai Oilamim – with Mordechai Shapiro and Benny Friedman, 2022
- Va'ani Evtach Bach – with Beri Weber and Shmueli Ungar, 2023
- Unstoppable – with Alex Clare, 2023
- Bar Yochai – with Benny Friedman and Shloime Daskal, 2023
- Hakodosh Baruch Hu Yoter Gadol Mizeh – with Shmuel, 2024
- L'shem Yichud – with Yaakov Shwekey, 2024
- Hashem Melech – with Itzik Dadya, 2025

== Awards and nominations ==
Dubb has been nominated for several awards in the Orthodox music scene, including Song of the Year in the Kikar HaShabbat music awards in 2023.
