= Zalmen Mlotek =

American conductor, pianist, and musical arranger

Zalmen Mlotek (Yiddish: זלמן נתן מלאָטעק; born June 15, 1951, in the Bronx, New York) is an American conductor, pianist, musical arranger, accompanist, composer, and the Artistic Director of the National Yiddish Theatre Folksbiene (NYTF), the longest continuous running Yiddish theatre in the world. He is an internationally recognized authority on Yiddish folk and theater music and a leading figure in the Jewish theatre and concert worlds. As the Artistic Director of the NYTF for the past 20 years, Mlotek helped revive Yiddish classics, instituted bi-lingual simultaneous English and Russian supertitles at all performances and brought leading creative artists of television, theatre and film, such as Itzhak Perlman, Mandy Patinkin, Sheldon Harnick, Theo Bikel, Ron Rifkin, and Joel Grey, to the Yiddish stage. His vision has propelled classics including NYTF productions of the world premiere of Isaac Bashevis Singer's Yentl in Yiddish (1998), Di Yam Gazlonim (The Yiddish Pirates of Penzance, 2006) and the 1923 Rumshinky operetta, The Golden Bride (2016), which was nominated for a Drama Desk Award and listed as a New York Times Critics Pick. During his tenure at the NYTF, the theatre company has been nominated for more than 10 Drama Desk Awards, four Lucille Lortel Awards, and has been nominated for three Tony Awards. In 2015, he was listed as one of the Forward 50 by The Forward, which features American Jews who have had a profound impact on the American Jewish community.

== Education ==
Mlotek received his formal training as a classical conductor at the Juilliard School of Music, where he studied under Leonard Bernstein; he also studied at the New England Conservatory of Music, the Tanglewood Music Center, the Manhattan School of Music, and the Mannes School of Music. He has studied under Zubin Mehta and James Levine. Mlotek received his BA from City College and his MFA in Opera and Conducting from Purchase College in 1982.

He has presented master classes in Yiddish art song, folk, and theater music and taught at Columbia University, Yeshiva University, the Jewish Theological Seminary, Hebrew Union College, the University of California at Berkeley, and Bar-Ilan University.

== Productions ==
He brought Yiddish and Klezmer music to the Broadway and Off-Broadway stages with musicals he co-wrote including:

- Those Were the Days (co-creator), nominated for two Tony awards
- The Golden Land (co-creator), nominated for Drama Desk awards
- On Second Avenue (co-creator), nominated for two Drama Desk awards

Mr. Mlotek was the arranger and music director for Isaac Bashevis Singer's and Robert Brustein's acclaimed production of Shlemiel The First at Lincoln Center's Serious Fun Festival in 1995 that subsequently toured to San Francisco, Los Angeles, and Boston.

In 1995, Mr. Mlotek conceived and was musical director for the first All Star Klezmer Extravaganza at Lincoln Center, filmed by PBS for Great Performances and later released on CD and video as In The Fiddler's House with Itzhak Perlman. Mlotek has concertized in Paris, Amsterdam, Berlin, Krakow, Jerusalem, Tel-Aviv and other cities in Europe and Israel and has performed extensively throughout North America.

In 2018, Mlotek's team at the NYTF debuted Fiddler On The Roof in Yiddish at The Museum of Jewish Heritage to overwhelming critical acclaim. Originally slated for an eight-week run, the production had been extended numerous times till it was transferred to the Off-Broadway Venue Stage 42 where it currently runs. Mlotek serves as musical director and conductor for the production except on the Sabbath and Jewish holidays. It was Mlotek's idea to invite Oscar and Tony winning actor Joel Grey to direct the Yiddish production.

== Recordings ==
- The Golden Land, original cast recording
- Pearls of Yiddish Song, featuring Michael Alpert, Rosalie Becker, Phillis Berk, Adrienne Cooper, Emil Gorovets, Seymour Rechtzeit, Eleanor Reissa, Shoshana Ron, Henry Sapoznik, and Lorin Sklamberg
- In Love and In Struggle: The Musical Legacy of the Jewish Labor Bund
- Songs Are All I Have: Musical Legacy of Vladimir Heifetz
- Ghetto Tango: Wartime Yiddish Theater, with Adrienne Cooper

His many recordings include several made at the request of the United States Holocaust Museum in Washington, D.C. Mlotek's Yiddish choral work can be heard on Mandy Patinkin's Yiddish language CD Mameloshen on Nonesuch Records.

== Background and personal life ==
Mlotek was born in 1951 in the Bronx, New York. He is the son of Joseph (Yosl) Mlotek, born in 1918 in present-day Proszowice, Poland, and Eleanor Chana Mlotek (née Gordon), born in New York City in 1922 to parents from present-day Stowbtsy, Belarus and Byerazino, Belarus. His father was the education director at the Workmen's Circle, an American Jewish civic and cultural organization, and an editor at the Yiddish Forward. His mother was an archivist of Yiddish music, who, together with her husband, published three Yiddish songbooks. Mlotek grew up in the Amalgamated Housing Cooperative. His brother, Mark Mlotek, is a former President of Workmen's Circle.

In 1986, Mlotek married Debra Cohen, an occupational therapist; the couple have three children, including Rabbi Avram Mlotek, Elisha Mlotek, a founder of Zusha and Sarah Mlotek. He is a resident of Teaneck, New Jersey.
