= Dance Now =

2022 single by JID and Kenny Mason

Single by JID and Kenny Mason

from the album The Forever Story
- Released: August 9, 2022
- Genre: Hip hop
- Length: 3:47
- Label: Dreamville; Interscope
- Songwriters: Destin Route; Edwin Green, Jr.; John Welch; Aviad Poznansky; Shlomo Gaisin; Zachary Goldschmiedt; Elisha Mlotek
- Producers: Christo; Aviad

JID singles chronology
"Talk About Me" (2022)	"Dance Now" (2022)	"2007" (2022)

Kenny Mason singles chronology
"Overseas" (2022)	"Dance Now" (2022)	"Dracula" (2023)

Music video
- "Dance Now" on YouTube

"Dance Now" is a song by American rappers JID and Kenny Mason, released on August 9, 2022 as the second single from the former's third studio album The Forever Story (2022). Produced by Christo and Aviad, it contains additional vocals from American singer-songwriter Fousheé and a sample of "Yoel's Niggun" by Zusha.

== Background ==
The song was first mentioned by JID's manager Barry Hefner via Twitter on June 7, 2022. On August 8, JID announced that the song would be released the following day.

== Composition ==
"Dance Now" features a looped melody, over which JID raps in a quick but controlled manner accompanied with wordplay. Lyrically, he discusses the expectations placed on him, as well as the "allures and pitfalls of dancing with the devil". JID also makes a reference to Memphis Grizzlies player Ja Morant. The chorus is performed by Kenny Mason, with backing vocals from Fousheé.

== Critical reception ==
Tom Breihan of Stereogum wrote the song is "a nice indicator of what JID can do. JID recorded the track with longtime collaborator Christo, and it’s got a big, clomping beat with a weirdly catchy looped melody. JID raps all over it, his flow reaching unstable speed-levels but never tripping over his own complicated patterns. He sounds playful and energized." Erika Marie of HotNewHipHop stated "You'll find JID beasting through bars over a beat that will make listeners bounce, and it's poised for any mood as you kick back and listen to the rapper showcase the art of Hip Hop storytelling."

== Music video ==
The music video was released alongside the single. Directed by Trey Leons, it finds JID rapping as he appears in a suburban area where violence occurs in some corners, with scenes of "riot police, disgruntled citizens, and twerking exotic dancers." The cover art of The Forever Story is captured by Naskademini from a late scene in the video.

== Charts ==
Chart performance for "Dance Now"
Chart (2022)	Peak position
New Zealand Hot Singles (RMNZ)	16
US Bubbling Under Hot 100 (Billboard)	13
US Hot R&B/Hip-Hop Songs (Billboard)	43
