= Akiva (singer) =

Israeli singer-songwriter (born 1991)

Akiva Turgeman עקיבא תורג'מן
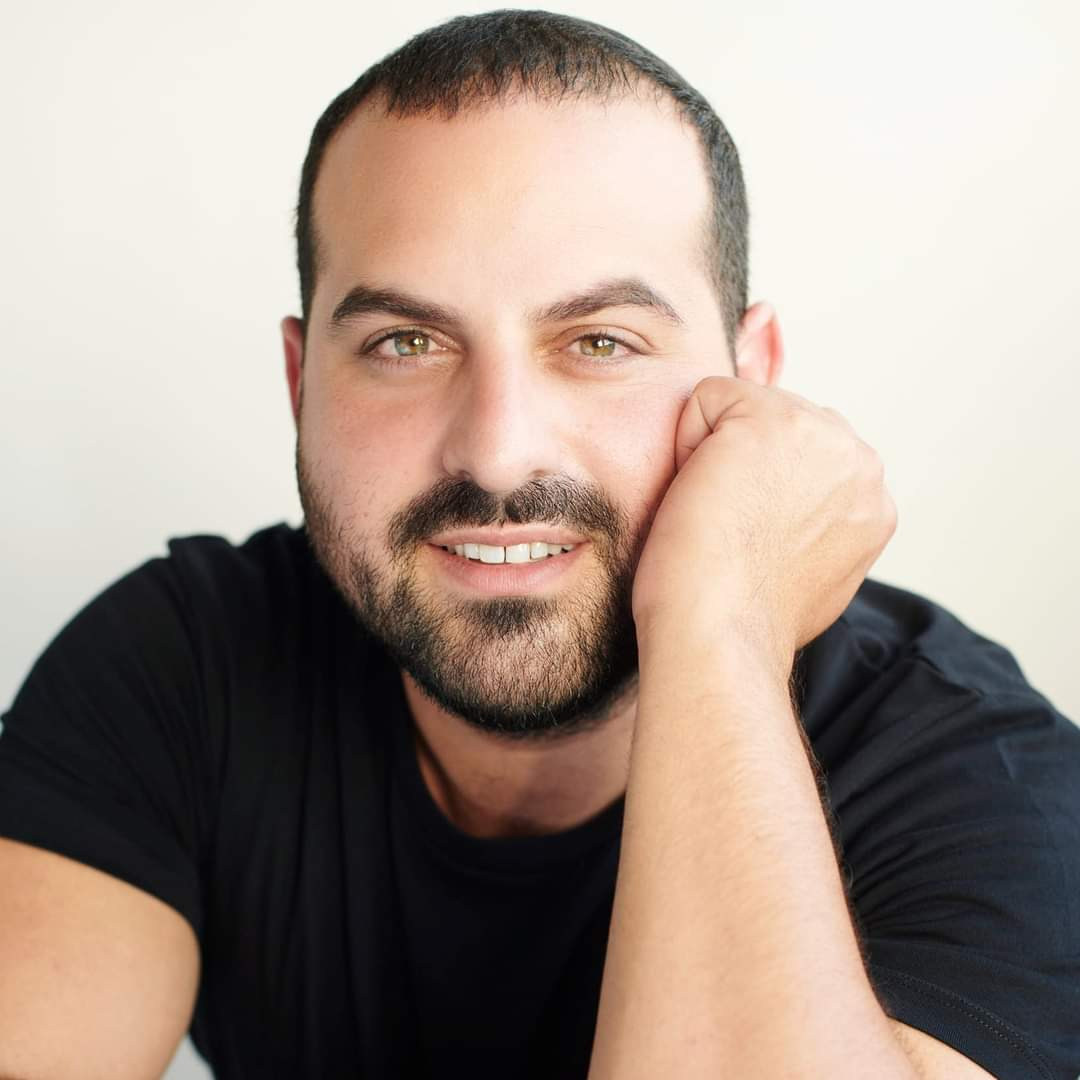

Background information
- Born: 23 July 1991 (age 34); Dimona, Israel
- Genres: Pop, Soul music
- Occupations: Singer, songwriter, producer
- Years active: 2017–present
- Spouse: Tzurit Turgeman

Akiva Turgeman, better known as Akiva (Hebrew: עקיבא תורג'מן; born 23 July 1991 in Dimona, Israel), is an Israeli musician. He is the son of Rabbi David Turgeman, who is the chief rabbi of Dimona (as well as the head of the Yeshiva there), and belongs to a founding family of Dimona.

Akiva has a sister,Ruchama Ben Yosef ,who is also a singer.

== Early life and education ==
Akiva grew up in Dimona, where he was influenced by an array of musical styles. His formal musical training began at the Mizmor Music Academy, where he developed skills in singing and songwriting. Following his studies, he was drafted as a combat soldier in the Israeli Defense Forces' Golani Brigade.

== Musical career ==
In 2017, he released the album Worlds, produced by Nir Maimon. Music critic Netanel Leifer gave the album a positive review and wrote: "There are a lot of new artists with new albums. Some are good, some are a little less, and some are excellent. One of them is Akiva, who released his debut album Worlds, a short and exciting rock album that manages to combine soul and emotion with stormy and penetrating rock."

In 2018, he released singles from his second album produced by Maor Shoshan titled "Don't Give Up" and "Lech Lecha".

Akiva gained recognition with his single "Don't Give Up", which reached first place in the official Galgalatz parade and seventh place in the station's annual Hebrew parade in collaboration with Ynet. This song, alongside others like "Pshutim" and "Atah Holech Iti", have been described as blending religious themes with contemporary music styles. The single garnered 18 million views on YouTube. In June 2019, he was invited to Ishay Ribo's concert in Caesarea and the two performed "Don't Give Up" in a duet that garnered 6.6 million views on YouTube.

In March 2020, he released the single "Simple", co-written and composed with his wife. The single garnered 13 million views on YouTube.

In July 2020, singer Idan Raphael Habib released the single "Shlemim", which was written and composed by Turgeman alongside Avi Ohayon and Matan Dror.

In March 2021, he released the single "You Go With Me", which was composed and written by Akiva, Avi Ohayon, Natan Goshen and Matan Dror. The single garnered 5.8 million views on YouTube.

In July 2021, he released the song "Shalom Babayit", which he wrote and composed with the creative duo Dolly and Fen.

In February 2022, he released the single and music video "Yesh Becha Hakol", which he wrote for his son together with his wife and composed alone. As of 2024, the single has amassed 16 million views on YouTube. and won the title of Song of the Year on the music charts of Kikar HaShabbat, Kol Play Radio and Kol BaRama Radio. Akiva also won the title of Singer of the Year in these three shows.

In December 2022, during the holiday of Hanukkah, Akiva appeared in Binyanei HaUmah. Music critic Netanel Leifer was present at the event and gave it a positive review: "Akiva is an excellent vocalist with high and precise tones, a singer with a real and soulful soul, someone who pours his heart out on stage when he sings. Many singers sing with devotion, but I also believe in Akiva."

On August 8, 2023, he released the single "Want to Wake Up".

In January 2024 he released the single "Hold Strong".

In May 2024 he released the single "Learn to Fly". The song reached number 90 on Hitlist.

On June 13, 2024, he released his third album, A Thousand Locks. On November 12, his song "Run My Children" was released.

== Influences and style ==
Akiva says his musical style was influenced by the music of his youth, from Led Zeppelin to piyutim, and that he feels a strong connection to Moroccan music and the traditional Jewish liturgical music he was surrounded by from childhood. He describes his approach as a kibbutz galuyot that reflects the cultural influences in his life.

== Personal life ==
Akiva resides in Pardes Chana with his wife, Tzurit, and their five children. He has spoken about the heavy workload musicians can face when they become successful, and says he prays for good mental health.

== Discography ==
=== Albums ===
- 2017: עולמות
- 2021: אל תעזבי ידיים
- 2024: אלף מנעולים

=== Singles ===
- 2018: הכל עוד אפשרי
- 2018: לך לך
- 2019: אל תעזבי ידיים
- 2021: פשוטים
- 2021: אתה הולך איתי
- 2024: להחזיק חזק
- 2024: ללמוד לעוף
