= Mordechai Shapiro =

American singer, songwriter and entertainer (born 1989)

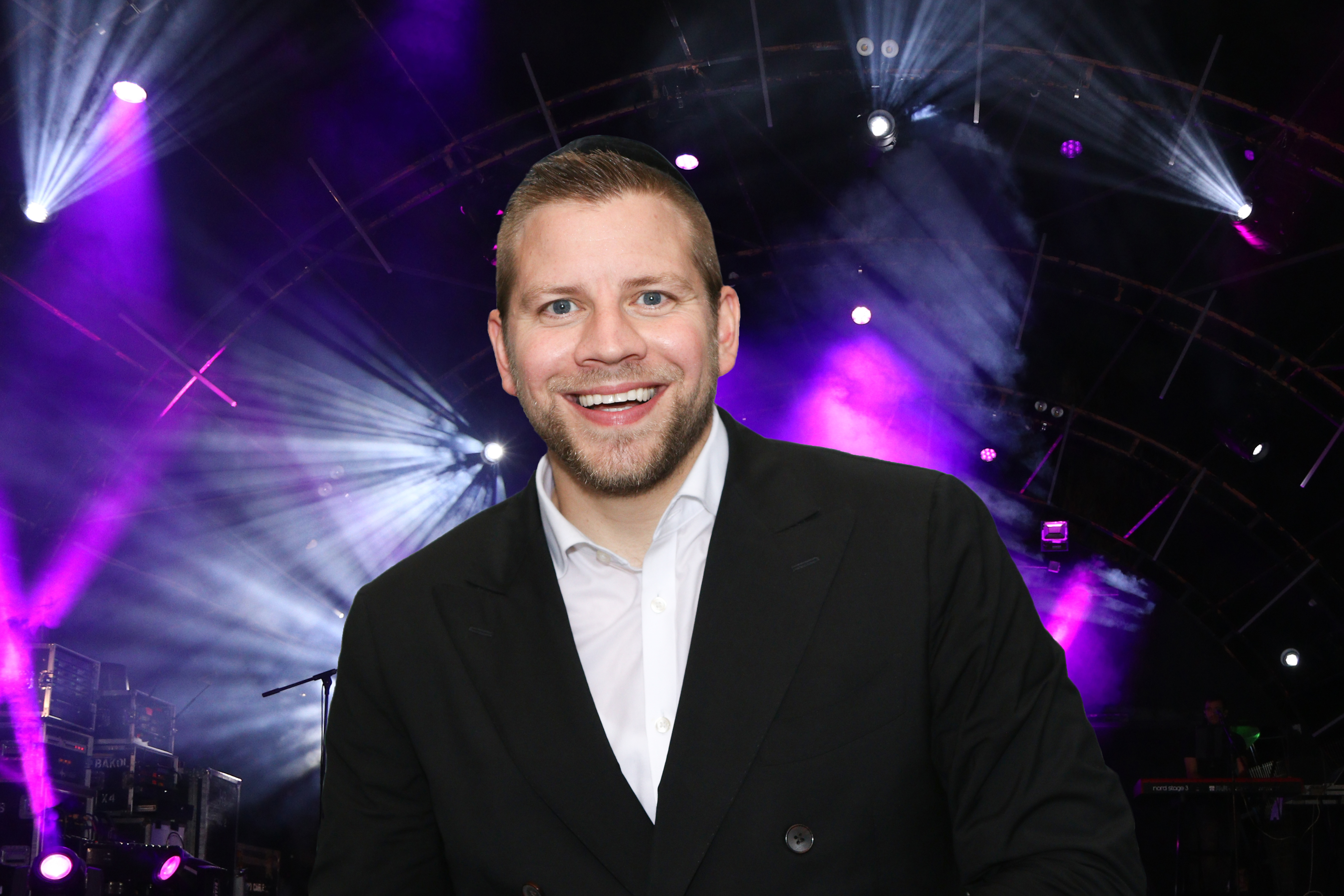

Background information
- Born: December 9, 1989 (age 36); Monsey, New York, United States
- Genres: Orthodox pop
- Years active: 1997–present
- Spouse: Raquel Guenoun (m. 2010)
- Website: mordechaishapiro.com

Mordechai Shapiro (born December 9, 1989) is an American singer-songwriter and entertainer in the Orthodox pop industry. Jewish music producer Yitzy Waldner said that he has an "ability to do things with his voice no one else in this business can".

== Biography ==
Mordechai Shapiro was born on December 9, 1989 in Monsey, New York. His father was a chazzan and his mother had a background as a trained opera singer. Growing up in a Modern Orthodox household, he attended The Adolph Schreiber Hebrew Academy of Rockland for grade school, and the Marsha Stern Talmudical Academy for high school. Following his graduation from high school, Shapiro learned in yeshiva in Yeshiva Netiv Aryeh and Yeshivas Bais Yisroel.

In 2010, Shapiro married Raquel Guenoun.

== Career ==
Shapiro made his musical debut in 1997 as the star soloist of the Miami Boys Choir. As a child, he performed with Jewish entertainers such as Yaakov Shwekey even before he gained significant attention. He left Miami Boys Choir in 2003 when his voice became too deep to fit into a children's choir.

After leaving the choir, Shapiro took a break from music until his voice transitioned sufficiently. He was a student of voice teacher William Riley, who also taught Celine Dion and Josh Groban. Eventually, he began performing at weddings and other Jewish events as an independent artist.

Shapiro's solo career debuted in 2016 when he was signed by producer Yitzy Waldner, with the release of his album Kol Haderech, peaking at #15 on the Billboard World Music chart. The album was followed by Machar in 2017, peaking at #3, and Hakol Mishamayim in 2019, peaking at #7. Shapiro is also known for his extravagant music videos- often including elaborate sets and dancers, showcasing his larger than life personality. His hit video for "Hakol Mishamayim" sits at 14 Million views on YouTube. Hakol Mishamayim was filmed by Shimmy Socol, alongside Machar, Friends, Ein Od Milvado, also filmed by Socol.

Shapiro has cited Frank Sinatra, Michael Jackson and Michael Bublé as his musical influences.

== Discography ==
Albums

- Kol Haderech (2016)
- Machar (2017)
- Hakol Mishamayim (2019)
- Sing It (Freilach Band) (2021)
- Achas (2022)
- Yehei Rava (2025)

Singles

- Ani Maa'min (2013), debut single
- B'yachad (2017)
- K'dei Lehodos (2018)
- Hakol Mishamayim - Acoustic Version (2020)
- Ein Od Milvado (2020)
- Vehi Sheamda (2021)
- Abba (2021)
- Tamid Yesh Siba (2022)
- Achas (2022)
- Abba - Remix (2022)
- L'chai Olamim (2022), with Matt Dubb and Benny Friedman
- Ani Yehudi (2023)
- L'chai Olamim - VIP REMIX (2022), with Matt Dubb and Benny Friedman
- Ani Yehudi - REMIX (2023)
- Umibaladecha (2023), song for Ohel Sarala
- Yesh Bi Emunah (2023), with Shmuel
- Nagila (2024)
- Elul (2024) with EKEV
- Kivinu / Trying My Best (2025)
- Ein Kelokeinu / Mi Anochi (2025)
