= One Step Ahead (Aretha Franklin song) =

Single by Aretha Franklin
- B-side: "I Can't Wait Until I See My Baby's Face"
- Released: 1965
- Genre: Soul
- Length: 2:33
- Label: Columbia
- Songwriters: Eddie Snyder, Charles Singleton

Aretha Franklin singles chronology
| "Can't You Just See Me / Little Miss Raggedy Ann" (1965) | "One Step Ahead" (1965) | "I'm Losing You / Sweet Bitter Love" (1966) |

"One Step Ahead" is a song by American soul singer Aretha Franklin released on Columbia Records in 1965, two years before Aretha achieved stardom when she joined Atlantic Records. "One Step Ahead, the A-side of the single, peaked at #18 on the Hot Rhythm & Blues Singles chart. The B-side, "I Can't Wait Until I See My Baby's Face," was taken from her 1964 album Runnin' Out Of Fools.

"One Step Ahead" was not included on any of her Columbia studio albums, and remains one of her rarest releases

In 1999, hip-hop producer Ayatollah sampled its chorus for the track "Ms. Fat Booty", produced for Mos Def.

The same vocal part was sampled by Clutchy Hopkins for his "Sleepers Never Dig, Diggers Never Sleep Bootleg" and High Contrast for his song "Remind Me".

In 2017, hip-hop and rap producer Dem Jointz sampled segments from the song, including the chorus part sampled in "Ms. Fat Booty", for the song "All I Know" by DaniLeigh.

Cécile McLorin Salvant covered the song on her 2018 record The Window.

In 2022, hip-hop and rap producer DJ Scheme sampled multiple segments from the song, including the chorus part sampled in "Ms. Fat Booty", for "Surround Sound" which he produced for JID's album The Forever Story.

== Use in movies ==
Aretha Franklin's recording of the song has appeared in the music documentary Muscle Shoals (2013) and in the dramatic film, Moonlight (2016).
