= Surround Sound (song) =

2022 single by JID featuring 21 Savage and Baby Tate

Single by JID featuring 21 Savage and Baby Tate

from the album The Forever Story
- Released: January 14, 2022
- Recorded: 2021
- Genre: Hip hop; trap
- Length: 3:49
- Label: Dreamville; Interscope
- Songwriters: Destin Route; Shéyaa Abraham-Joseph; Tate Ferris; Gabriel Guerra; John Welch; Nuri Saberin
- Producers: DJ Scheme; Christo; Nuri

JID singles chronology
"Enemy" (2021)	"Surround Sound" (2022)	"Dope" (2022)

21 Savage singles chronology
"Outlawz" (2021)	"Surround Sound" (2022)	"Don't Play That" (2022)

Baby Tate singles chronology
"Hot One" (2021)	"Surround Sound" (2022)	"Slut Him Out Again" (2022)

Music video
- "Surround Sound" on YouTube

"Surround Sound" is a song by American rapper JID featuring British-American rapper 21 Savage and fellow American rapper Baby Tate, released on January 14, 2022, as the lead single from the former's third studio album The Forever Story (2022). Produced by DJ Scheme, Christo, and Nuri, it contains a sample of "One Step Ahead" by Aretha Franklin. In late 2023, the song gained a viral resurgence on the video app TikTok after a trend named the "Ceiling Challenge" was created. As a result, more than 57,000 videos were made using the song. The trend caused the song to peak at number 40 on the Billboard Hot 100 in January 2024, two years after its original release.

== Background ==
A few days before the song was released, JID previewed the music video on Instagram. In a later post, he revealed the inspiration behind the song was from focusing on the environmental sounds and noises around him as a child, to find an escape from his chaotic home life.

== Composition ==
In the beginning of the song, a sample of "One Step Ahead" by Aretha Franklin is played and a loop built around it serves as the instrumental. JID raps the chorus and first verse with double entendres and multisyllabic rhymes. The second verse is rapped by 21 Savage, who "mixes gun talk with making sound financial decisions". Near the first half of the song, Baby Tate provides "fluttering vocals" in R&B style closing out of the first part. The beat then switches to a "woozy, bass-bombed wobble that artfully weaves in elements from the song's first half". During the second half of the song, JID returns with another verse, which has a darker approach and has been described as "cut-throat".

== Critical reception ==
The song received generally positive reviews from critics. Tom Breihan of Stereogum wrote that the song "makes it clear, once again, that J.I.D is a masterful technical rapper who can also write a serious hook." Chris DeVille of Stereogum wrote, "As for the track's leading man, he's switching up flows like it's nothing and toying with the English language on a level most rappers can't approach." Deville also noted JID's "marvelous flurry of syllables" and "sketching out a whole mural's worth of imagery in a single sentence fragment". DeVille praised 21 Savage's verse as well, writing that he "once again shows off his mastery of this kind of soul loop" and comparing it to his song "A Lot".

== Music video ==
The official music video was released alongside the single. Directed by Mac Grant and Chad Tennies, the video opens with JID going into an older model vehicle. He starts rapping as he is driving, with women in the passenger seats of the car. In a garage, he raps while surrounded by women, and is seen atop a car. 21 Savage performs his verse standing next to JID. Baby Tate sings while lying on top of a car. When the beat switches, the video transitions to black and white. The scene changes to that of an "eerie" house, where JID raps the last verse. Multiple clones of him are also seen in the house.

== Live performances ==
On September 8, 2022, JID appeared on NPR Tiny Desk Concerts, which featured full-band performances of "Surround Sound" among other hit singles. On January 8, 2024, JID performed the viral song on The Tonight Show Starring Jimmy Fallon.

== Use in other media ==
The song is featured on the soundtrack of the 2022 video game NBA 2K23.

On March 1, 2024, the song became a microtransaction in the rhythm video game Fortnite Festival.

== Charts ==
=== Weekly charts ===
Weekly chart performance for "Surround Sound"
Chart (2022–2024)	Peak position
Australia (ARIA)	27
Australia Hip Hop/R&B (ARIA)	5
Austria (Ö3 Austria Top 40)	65
Canada Hot 100 (Billboard)	27
Germany (GfK)	66
Global 200 (Billboard)	49
Ireland (IRMA)	45
Latvia (LAIPA)	10
Lithuania (AGATA)	14
New Zealand (Recorded Music NZ)	21
Slovakia Singles Digital (ČNS IFPI)	99
Switzerland (Schweizer Hitparade)	60
UK Singles (Official Charts)	35
UK Hip Hop/R&B (Official Charts)	12
US Billboard Hot 100	40
US Hot R&B/Hip-Hop Songs (Billboard)	13
US Rhythmic Airplay (Billboard)	1

=== Year-end charts ===
2024 year-end chart performance for "Surround Sound"
Chart (2024)	Position
US Hot R&B/Hip-Hop Songs (Billboard)	36
US Rhythmic (Billboard)	11

== Certifications ==
Certifications for "Surround Sound"
Region	Certification	Certified units/sales
Australia (ARIA)	Platinum	70,000^{‡}
Brazil (Pro-Música Brasil)	Platinum	40,000^{‡}
Canada (Music Canada)	Platinum	80,000^{‡}
France (SNEP)	Gold	100,000^{‡}
New Zealand (RMNZ)	2× Platinum	60,000^{‡}
Poland (ZPAV)	Platinum	50,000^{‡}
United Kingdom (BPI)	Gold	400,000^{‡}
United States (RIAA)	3× Platinum	3,000,000^{‡}
Streaming
Greece (IFPI Greece)	Gold	1,000,000^{†}
^{‡} Sales+streaming figures based on certification alone.^{†} Streaming-only figures based on certification alone.
