= Ishay Ribo =

Israeli singer-songwriter (born 1989)

Ishay Ribo ישי ריבו
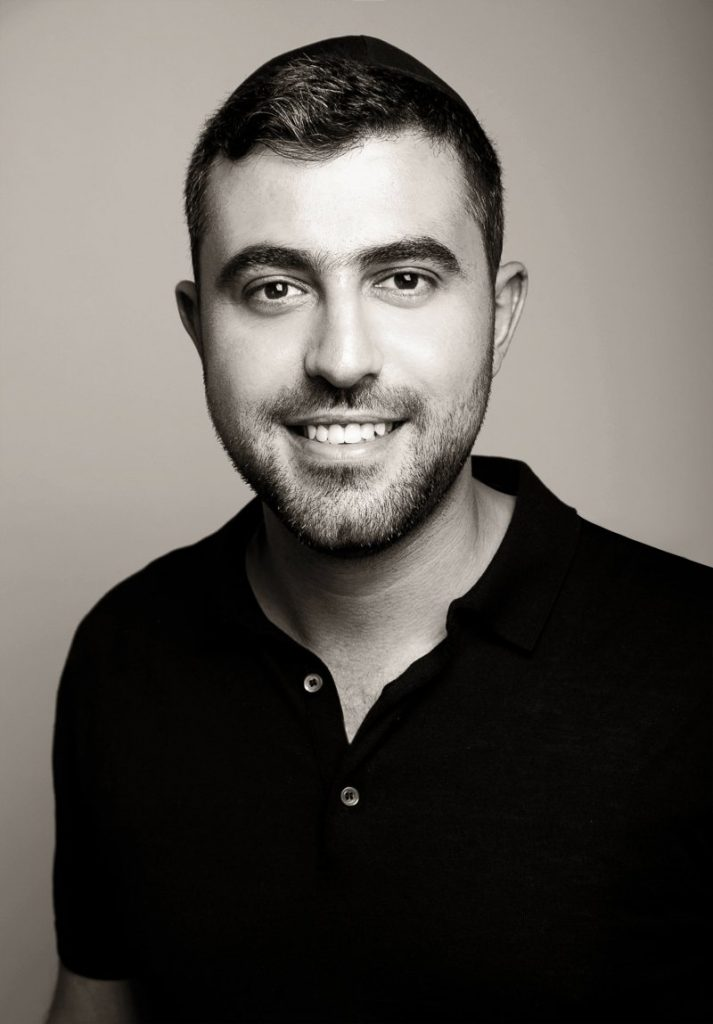

Background information
- Born: 3 February 1989 (age 37); Marseille, France
- Genres: Contemporary Jewish religious music, piyyut, nigun, pizmonim, folk, rock
- Instruments: Vocals; guitar
- Years active: 2007–present
- Website: ishayribo.com

Ishay Ribo (Hebrew: ישי ריבו; born 3 February 1989) is an Israeli singer-songwriter. A Sephardic Orthodox Jew, he has gained popularity in Israel among Haredi, national-religious, and secular Jewish audiences. He has released five studio albums, two of which have been certified gold and one which went platinum.

== Early life ==
Ishay Ribo, born on 3 February 1989 to a traditional Sephardi Jewish family in Marseille, France. His parents also grew up in France, having immigrated from Morocco and Algeria in their youth. His father began to take on more religious observance in France. When Ribo was eight and a half years old, his family immigrated to Israel, where they became fully Torah-observant. Early on, they resided in Kfar Adumim, where Ribo attended a national-religious elementary school. After six months he transferred to a Haredi Talmud Torah in Jerusalem. He later studied in yeshivot in Kiryat Sefer and Gilo, the latter program designed for French olim (immigrants to Israel). Since his marriage he has studied at Midreshet Ziv, an Orthodox kollel in the Sha'arei Hesed neighborhood of Jerusalem.

Ribo began working on his first album at Sach HaKol Studios in Jerusalem shortly before enlisting in the Israel Defense Forces for a two-year stint. He served in the Technology and Maintenance Corps, and sang in the IDF Rabbinical Choir during the last six months of his service.

== Career ==
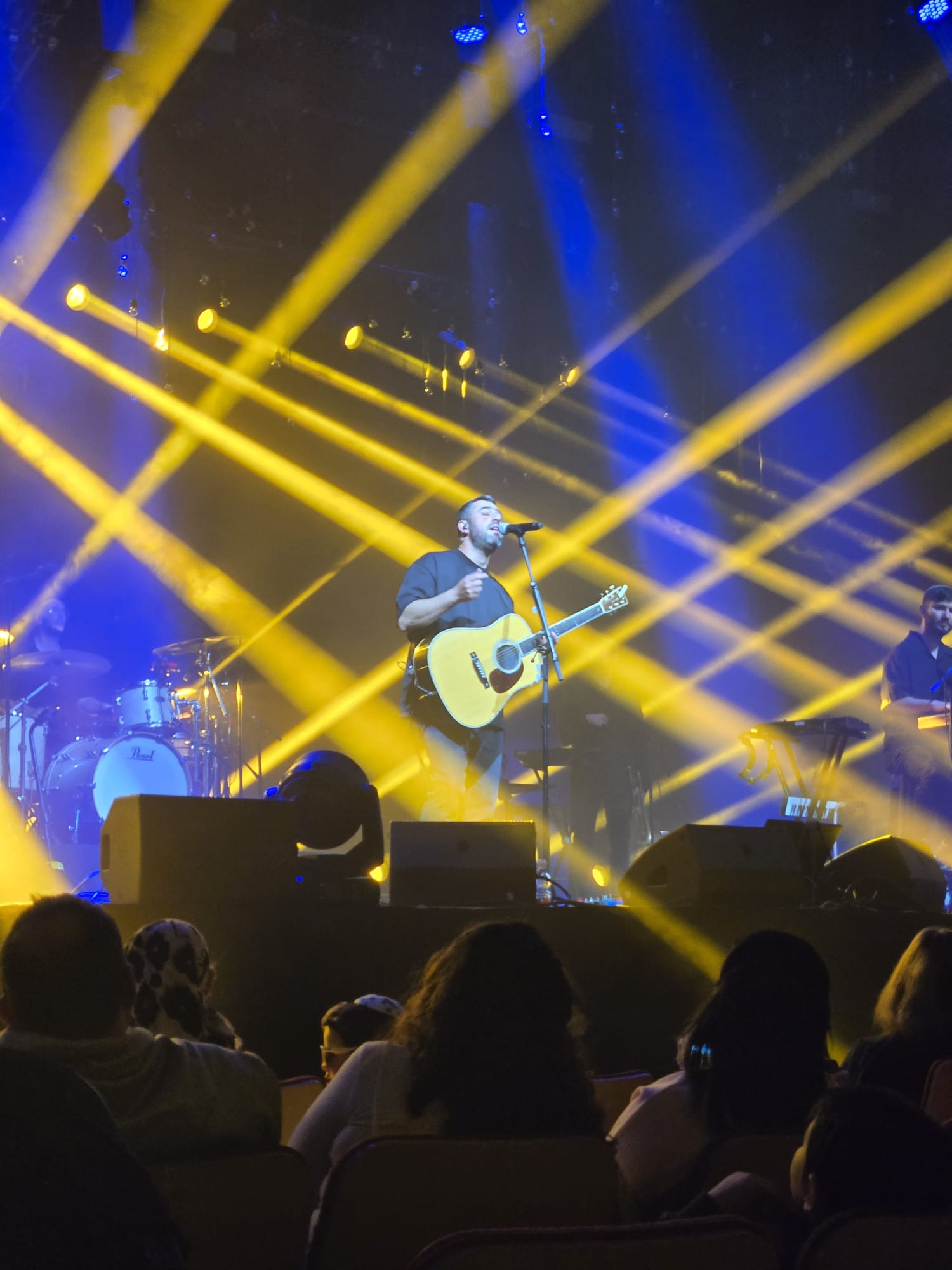
Ishay Ribo performing at Binyanei HaUma in Jerusalem, Israel, on 17 April 2025.

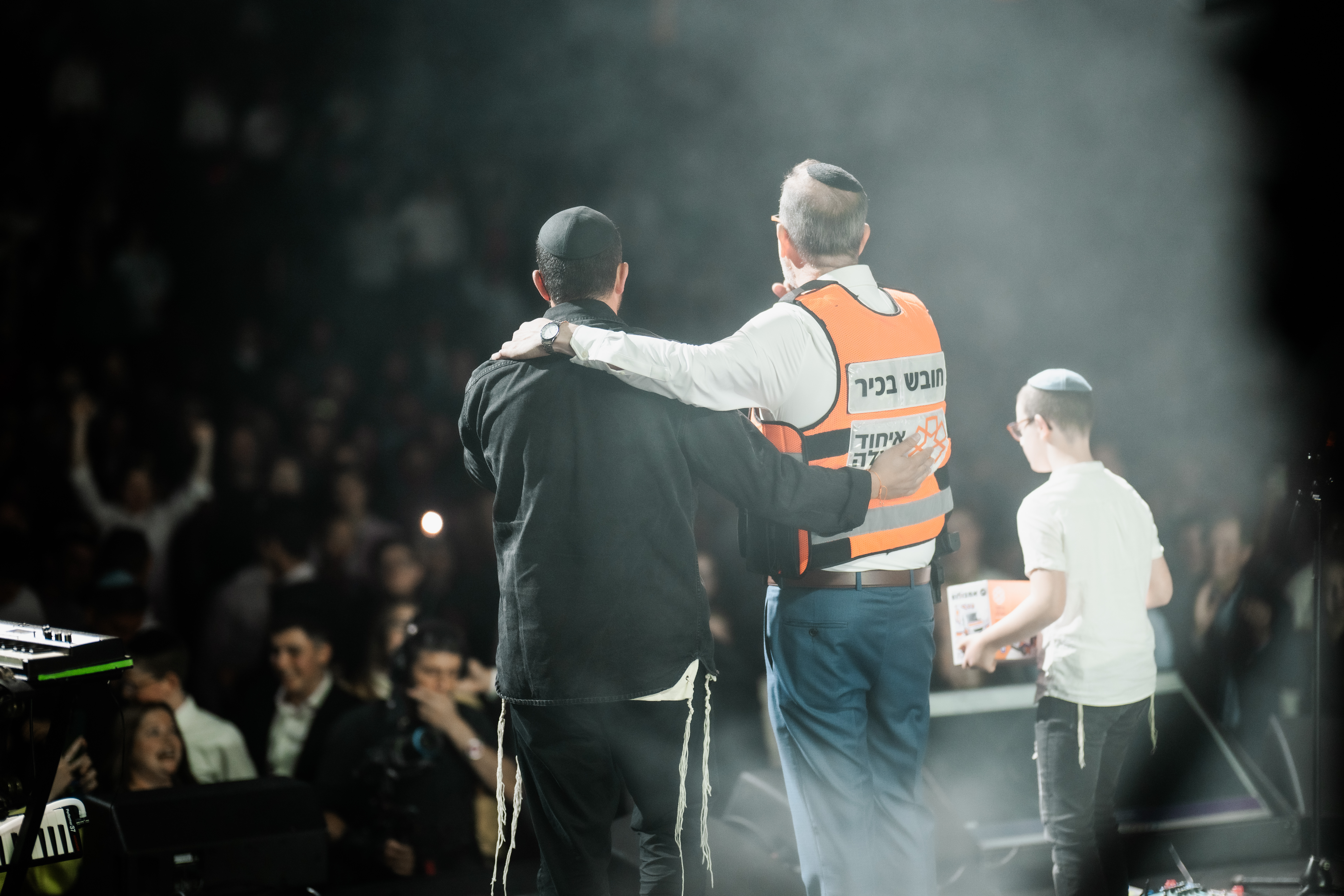
Eli Beer and Ishay Ribo at the 2024 United Hatzalah concert

=== Music career ===
Ribo began singing at age eight; at age thirteen, he began writing, composing, and recording songs at home. Four years later, having composed 100 songs, he learned to play the guitar. He had no formal music education. He and his friends formed a band called "Tachlis" (Goal) which combined heavy metal rock with religious lyrics.

In 2012, Ribo was the first religious singer to take part in the Idan Raichel Project, and performed "Ohr Kazeh" ("A Light Like This") on Raichel's 2013 album " Reva LaShesh" ("A Quarter to Six"). He performed "Tochu Ratzuf Ahavah" at one of Raichel's concerts.

In 2014, he performed the song "Chadeish Sessoni" on the album "Simchat Olam" ("Joy of the World"), which consisted of songs composed by Rabbi Yitzchak Ginsburgh. He was also featured on the album Achakeh Lo ("I Will Await Him"), which highlights songs from the Holocaust by The Heart and The Spring band.

In August 2019, Ribo performed Amir Benayoun's "Nitzacht Iti HaKol" ("You Won Everything With Me") alongside Benayoun at a concert in Sultan's Pool, Jerusalem; the music video received more than one million views in its first week of release.

In December 2019, Ribo performed Akiva Turgeman's song "Al Ta'azvi Yadayim" (Don't Let Go) alongside Akiva at a concert in the Roman amphitheater of Caesarea.

On 3 September 2023, (18 Elul, 5783) Ribo became the first Israeli artist to headline Madison Square Garden. The sold-out concert featured appearances from fellow Israeli artists Akiva (Turgeman) and Amir Dadon, as well as a surprise appearance from veteran American Hassidic artist, Avraham Fried. Ribo returned to Madison Square Garden on 15 September 2024.

On 14 November 2023, Ribo was one of two Israeli performers who sang at the March for Israel rally in Washington, DC. The event attracted close to 300,000 people, making it the "largest pro-Israel gathering in history".

==== Solo singles and albums ====
The songs on the album [Tocho Ratzuf Ahavah], all of them by Ribo, are endlessly mature and sensitive; the melodies sometimes sound like a familiar synagogue tune, sometimes like rock classics

— Ashdod Performance Arts Center

In 2014, Ribo produced his debut album, Tocho Ratzuf Ahavah ("He Is Filled With Continuous Love"). The third single from the album, "Kol Dodi" ("The Voice of My Beloved"), earned second place at the 2013 Israel Song Festival. The album was certified gold.

In October 2015, Ribo released the first single from his second album, "Miksha Ahat Zahav" ("A Solid Piece of Gold"), which he wrote in honor of the birth of his second son. In 2016, he released his second album, Pachad Gevahim ("Fear of Heights"). That album too was certified gold.

In February 2018, Ribo released the album Shetach Afor ("Gray Area"), which was certified platinum. One of the singles on the album, "Lashuv HaBaita" ("Coming Home"), easily became Ribo's biggest song in Israel, with its music video logging more than 49 million views on YouTube. Atop this, the song has over 17 million streams on Spotify as of 2023.

In 2018, he released "Nafshi" ("My Soul"), a duet sung with Hasidic singer Motty Steinmetz. Ribo sings his part in traditional Hebrew pronunciation while Steinmetz sings with Hasidic pronunciation. In January 2019, he released the single "HaLev Sheli" ("My Heart"). On 3 September, the single "Seder Ha'avodah" ("Order of the Service") was released, a song which describes the Yom Kippur service in the Temple in Jerusalem. These three singles were from his album Elul 5779, released in September 2019. This album consists of Selichot hymns and songs relating to Yom Kippur, including covers of songs by Shlomo Carlebach and Rabbi Hillel Paley, whom Ribo wishes to introduce to his secular audiences.

In March 2024, during the Gaza war, he released the single Porchim L'shuvam, from his fifth album. The full album, Sof Chama Lavo, was released in September 2024, on the 10th anniversary of his first album, in a concert at Madison Square Garden.

I believe that good music can bring people together. When you write it in a certain way, it can touch people and it can open things up. This is the generation we're in now. There's a process of redemption in what I do, there's the ethereal and the material.

— Ishay Ribo on his popularity among both religious and secular Jews

Ribo performs in concert throughout Israel, both in general venues and for gender-separated Haredi audiences. He often performs with Shlomo Artzi, Omer Adam, Natan Goshen, and Amir Dadon. He credits the national-religious sector for about 90 percent of his concert appearances. At his concerts, audiences sing the words along with him.

=== Songwriting ===
Ribo has written songs for Gad Elbaz, Avraham Fried, and Meidad Tasa. For Elbaz, these include "Rak Kan" ("Only Here") and "KeBatechilah" ("As In The Beginning"); future collaborations are planned.

== Musical style ==
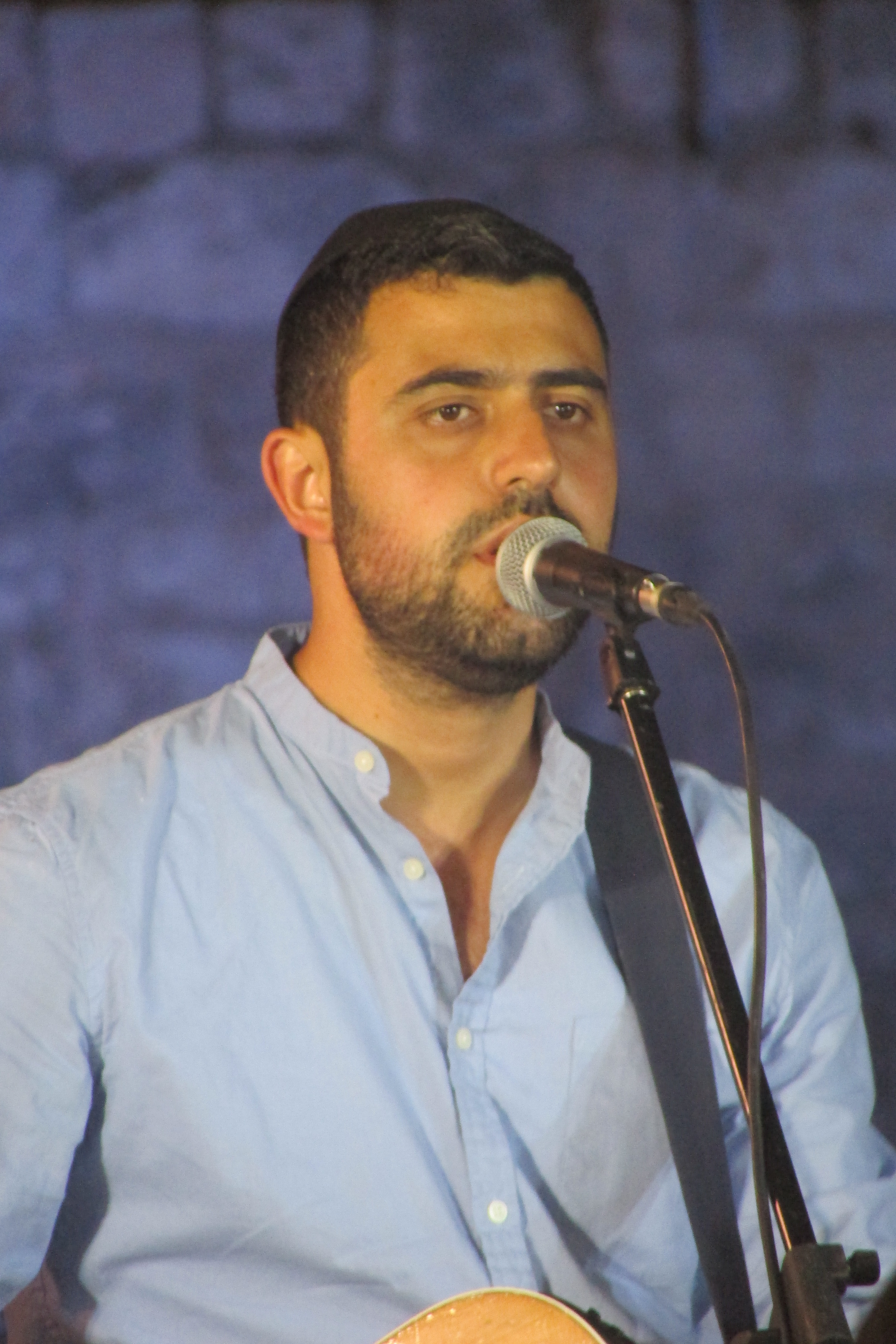
Ribo in 2017

Ribo's songs focus exclusively on spirituality, faith, and God, a decision he says he made at the age of 14. While his original goal was to sing for religious audiences, according to Jessica Steinberg, writing for The Times of Israel, he has attained popularity among secular audiences as well. Though religious songs are generally shunned by secular audiences in Israel, the quality of his music and artistic expression enables him, according to Haaretz music critic Ben Shalev, to successfully "bridge the divide" between Orthodox and secular.

My music has reached the broadest audience possible, from the most chasidic people who I would never have expected to listen to it, to complete atheists who write to me and say, "I don't believe in anything, but your songs awaken something in my soul".

— Ishay Ribo

Unlike Hasidic music, which sets verses from Tanakh to music, Ribo writes original lyrics, drawing inspiration from a variety of religious sources, including the commentary of Rashi, the teachings of Rabbi Shlomo Wolbe and Rabbi Eliyahu Eliezer Dessler, and ideas he hears in synagogue sermons. He mainly sings in Hebrew. Ribo characterizes his musical genre as "rock/folk". He is known for his "mature" voice and "phenomenal stage presence".

Ribo cites as his musical influences Eviatar Banai and Amir Benayoun.

== Awards and recognition ==
In 2012, Ribo received an ACUM prize for encouraging creativity. For his debut single ("Tocho Ratzuf Ahavah") he was named Singer of the Year, Discovery of the Year, and Song of the Year by Radio Galei Israel and Maariv. He also won the accolades of Singer of the Year, Album of the Year (Tocho Ratzuf Ahavah), and Song of the Year ("Kol Dodi") from Radio Kol Chai. He was voted Singer of the Year 2024 by streaming platform 24Six.

In 2017, he performed at the torch-lighting ceremony on Israel's 69th Independence Day.

In 2019, he was awarded the Israel Minister of Education's Uri Orbach Prize for Jewish Culture in the field of music.

In 2019, Ribo won first place for the Most Views On YouTube In 2019 by an Orthodox Jewish Artist. He won the award by a high margin for the second year in a row. Ribo's official YouTube channel had 224 million views and 212,000 subscribers. This is the second year in the row that Ribo doubled the number of views on his channel within a year.

== Personal life ==
Ribo is married to Yael, daughter of Rabbi Avner Tonic, and they have five children. They live in the Kiryat Moshe neighborhood of Jerusalem.

== Discography ==
=== Studio albums ===
Title	Year
Sof Chama Lavo	2024
Elul Taf Shin Ayin Tes ("Elul 5779")	2019
Shetach Afor ("Gray Area")	2018
Hatishma Koli - Galgalatz ("Would You Hear My Voice - Galgalatz, in tribute to the album 'The High Windows'")	2017
Pachad Gevahim ("Fear of Heights")	2016
Tocho Ratzuf Ahavah ("He Is Filled With Continuous Love")	2014

== See also ==
- Music of Israel
