= Congregation Aish Kodesh =

Orthodox Jewish synagogue in New York

- Hebrew: קהילת אש קודש
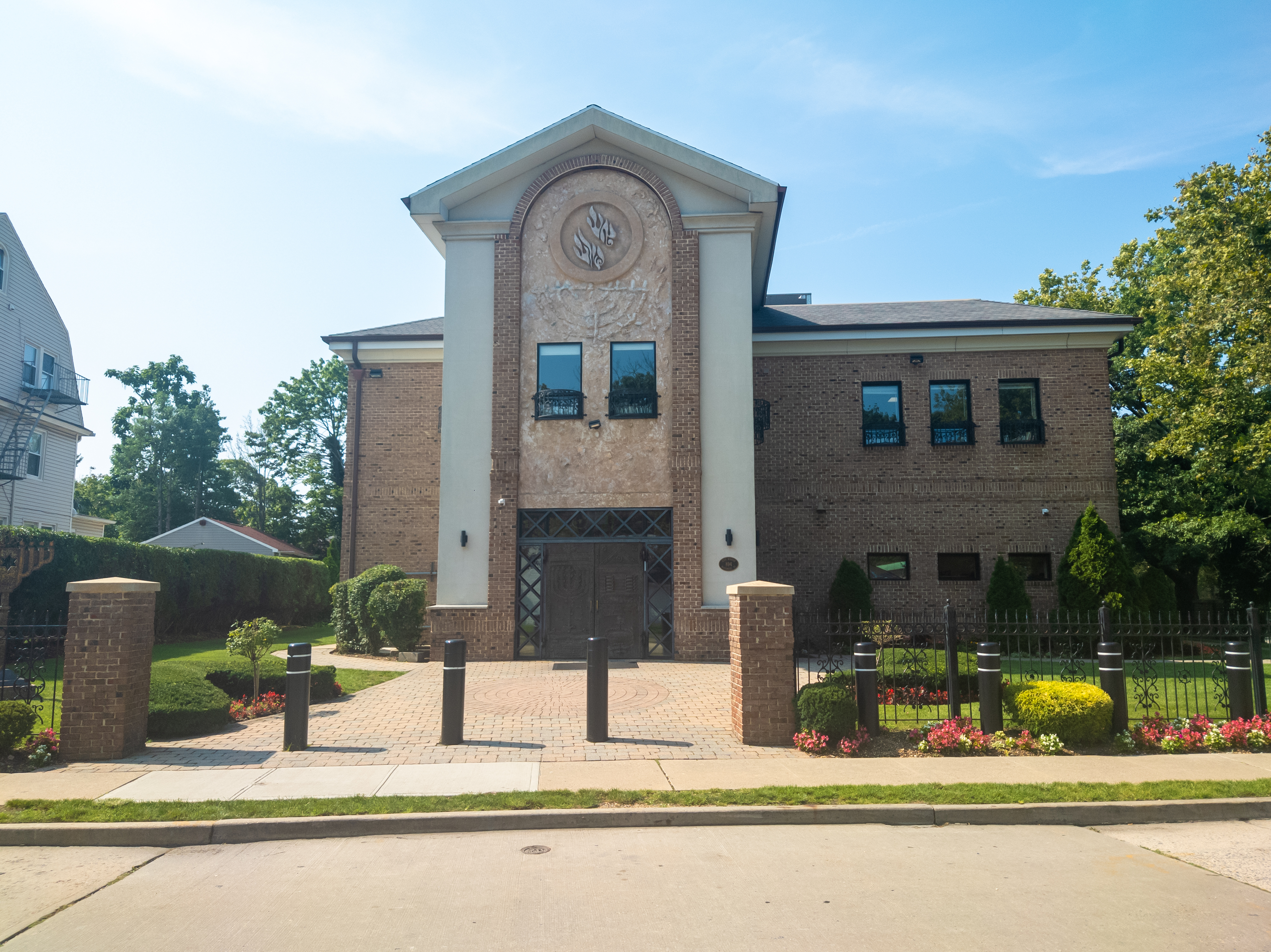

- Location on Long Island, New York

Religion
- Affiliation: Hasidic Judaism
- Rite: Hasidic
- Ecclesiastical or organisational status: Synagogue
- Leadership: Rabbi Moshe Weinberger - Morah d'Asrah Rabbi Yehoshua Rubenstein - Mashpia Rabbi Yirmy Ginsburg - Assistant Rabbi Howie Hershkovits - President Yaakov Zoldan - Vice President
- Status: Active

Location
- Location: 894 Woodmere Place, Woodmere, Nassau County, Long Island, New York
- Country: United States
- Coordinates: 40°37′59″N 73°42′50″W

Architecture
- Architect: Reuben Gross
- Type: Synagogue
- Style: Shtiebel
- Founder: Rabbi Moshe Weinberger
- Established: 1992 (as a congregation)
- Completed: 2002

Specifications
- Capacity: 400 worshipers
- Interior area: 16,000 square feet (1,500 m^{2})

Website
- aishkodesh.org

Congregation Aish Kodesh (Hebrew: קהילת אש קודש, lit. 'Congregation Holy Fire') is an Chasidic Jewish congregation and synagogue, located in Woodmere, Nassau County, on Long Island, New York, United States.

== Overview ==
Led since its founding in 1992 by Rabbi Moshe Weinberger, the synagogue was named after the Piaseczna Rav, Rabbi Kalonymus Kalman Shapira, known by the name of his last work, Aish Kodesh, who was a leading Polish Hasidic rabbi in prewar Europe. By injecting Hasidic elements into the prayer services, social events, and daily classes, Aish Kodesh has been called a "phenomenon" and a "revolution" in the religious community of Long Island.

== History ==
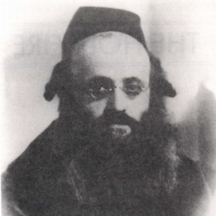
The Piaseczna Rav, Rabbi Kalonymus Kalman Shapira, known as the Aish Kodesh

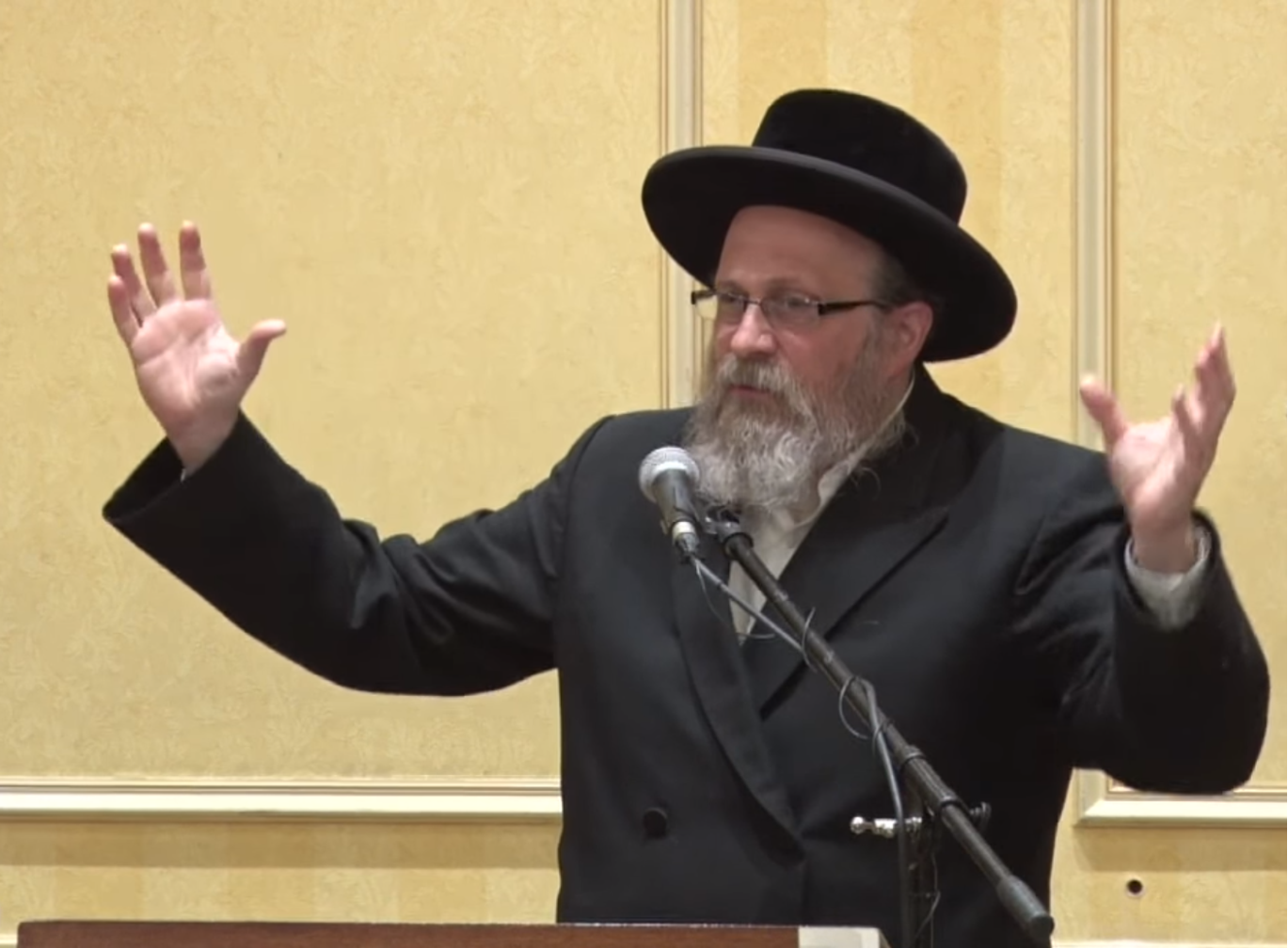
Rabbi Moshe Weinberger

Aish Kodesh was founded in December 1992 by a group led by Rabbi Moshe Weinberger, a native of Queens, New York, who received rabbinic ordination from Rabbi Isaac Elchanan Theological Seminary (RIETS). Raised in a Modern Orthodox home, Weinberger earned master's degrees in Jewish philosophy from the Bernard Revel Graduate School of Jewish Studies at Yeshiva University, and in educational administration from Columbia University Teachers College, and taught in Jewish day schools for two decades before becoming the rabbi of Aish Kodesh.

Weinberger named the synagogue after the Piaseczna Rav, Rabbi Kalonymus Kalman Shapira, known by the name of his last work, Aish Kodesh (Holy Fire), who was a leading Polish Hasidic rabbi in prewar Europe. He explained his choice in a 1999 article in Jewish Action:

The Rebbe was truly a holy fire sent to warm the hearts and illuminate the minds of a broken generation. In the depth of the darkness, he remained steadfast in his unshakable faith in the immortality of Knesses Yisrael [the Congregation of Israel]. Our generation has been resurrected from the ashes of Auschwitz and Treblinka, yet we have fallen into a state of spiritual numbness, a life of cold prayers, empty mitzvos, rote learning, and an overall sense of spiritual alienation . . . Thus our experiment began with the Aish Kodesh as our role model for spiritual renewal and the Shulchan Aruch as our guide to uncompromising halachic observance.

Weinberger introduced Hasidic practices and teachings into the congregation to forge connection and meaning in Jewish observance. These practices include leading the congregation in song and dance after prayer services, as well as accompanying congregants on tours of kivrei tzaddikim (graves of the righteous) in Ukraine and Israel. Weinberger teaches the works of the Piaseczna Rav in weekly lectures at the synagogue and since 2000 has conducted an annual hillula celebration on the yahrtzeit of the Piaseczna Rav as well as on Lag BaOmer, the hillula of Rabbi Shimon bar Yochai, which each attract more than 1,000 attendees. In 2015 a collection of Weinberger's Torah discourses delivered at the annual hillula for the Piaseczna Rav was published under the title Warmed by the Fire of the Aish Kodesh.

Weinberger's lectures and the daily schedule of classes for men and women draw on a wide variety of Hasidic sources, including the Baal Shem Tov, Ramchal, Rebbe Nachman of Breslov, the Baal HaTanya, and Izbica, as well as the Vilna Gaon, Rabbi Tzadok Hakohen, and Rabbi Avraham Yitzchak Kook among many others. Modern-day Hasidic works by Rabbi Sholom Noach Berezovsky, the previous Slonimer Rebbe of Jerusalem, The Lubavitcher Rebbe, and Rabbi Yaakov Meir Shechter of Breslov are also studied.

== Building design ==
The synagogue building is modeled after a Polish Hasidic shtiebel. Completed in 2002, the front doors are replicas of the doors fronting the Rema synagogue in Kraków. A huge mural depicting the Warsaw Ghetto appears inside the entrance. Israeli artist Ofra Friedland was commissioned to produce "murals, ceramics, paintings, bronze sculpture, stained glass windows, woodwork and stone artwork" throughout the synagogue. In the main sanctuary, the 6-foot (1.8 m) high mechitza separating the men's and women's sections contains one-way glass so that women can observe the proceedings. Designed by Reuben Gross, the synagogue has capacity for 400 people in its 16,000-square-foot (1,500 m^{2}) sanctuary.

In 2015 the synagogue received $75,000 in federal funding from the United States Department of Homeland Security toward the installation of security enhancements such as "forced-entry-resistant technology, security-modified doors, alarm systems and surveillance cameras".

== Rabbinic leadership ==
- Rabbi Moshe Weinberger, Founder & Morah d'Asrah (Head Rabbi)
- Rabbi Yehoshua Rubenstein, Mashpia
- Rabbi Yirmy Ginsburg, Assistant Rabbi
