= Eleanor Mlotek =

Eleanor Chana Mlotek (née Gordon; April 9, 1922 – November 4, 2013) was a musicologist, specializing in Yiddish folklore. Isaac Bashevis Singer, the Yiddish writer and Nobel laureate, once called Mlotek and her husband, Joseph, “the Sherlock Holmeses of Yiddish folk songs.” She was also inducted in Hunter College's Hall of Fame.

WorldCat lists her as author of 70 works in 112 editions, in 6 languages. They include both collections of music and exhibition catalogs of Yiddish authors. She held the position of Music Archivist at the YIVO Institute for Jewish Research, and was also a columnist at the Yiddish Forward for over forty years.

She was born in Brooklyn and is the mother of Zalmen Mlotek, the artistic director of the National Yiddish Theatre - Folksbiene, and Mark Mlotek, an attorney and current treasurer of The Forward.

She died November 4, 2013, at home in the Bronx at the age of 91.

== Publications ==
=== Books ===
- Mlotek, Eleanor G. S. Ansky: (Shloyme-Zanvl Rappoport) 1863-1920 : His Life and Works : Catalog of an Exhibition. [New York]: YIVO Institute for Jewish Research, 1980.
- Mlotek, Eleanor G., Malke Gottlieb, and Roslyn Bresnick-Perry. מיר זיינען דא : לידער פון די געטאס און לאגערן / Mir Zaynen Do: Lider Fun Di Geṭos Un Lagern. (We are here: songs of the Holocaust) New York, N.Y.: Aroysgegebn fun Bildungs ḳomiṭeṭ fun Arbeṭer-ring, 1983.
- Mlotek, Eleanor and Joseph Mlotek. Songs of Generations: New Pearls of Yiddish Song. New York, NY: Workmen's Circle.
- Mlotek, Eleanor and Joseph Mlotek. Pearls of Yiddish Song: Favorite Folk, Art and Theater Songs. New York, NY: Workmen's Circle, 1988.
- Mlotek, Eleanor G. Mir Trogn A Gezang: Favorite Yiddish Songs. 4th Edition. New York, NY: Workmen's Circle, 2000.
- Rubin, Ruth, Eleanor G. Mlotek, and Mark Slobin. Yiddish folksongs from the Ruth Rubin Archive. Detroit, Mich: Wayne State University Press, 2007.
- Mlotek, Eleanor and Joseph Mlotek. Pearls of Yiddish Poetry. New York, NY: KTAV Publishing Press, 2010.

=== Journal articles ===
- Molotek, Eleanor Gordon. "International motifs in the Yiddish ballad" studies in Jewish Language and Literature 209-281 (1964)
- Molotek, Eleanor Gordon. "America in East European folksong" The Field of Yiddish 1: 178-198 (1954)
