= Shlomo Gaisin =

American singer

Shlomo Ari Gaisin
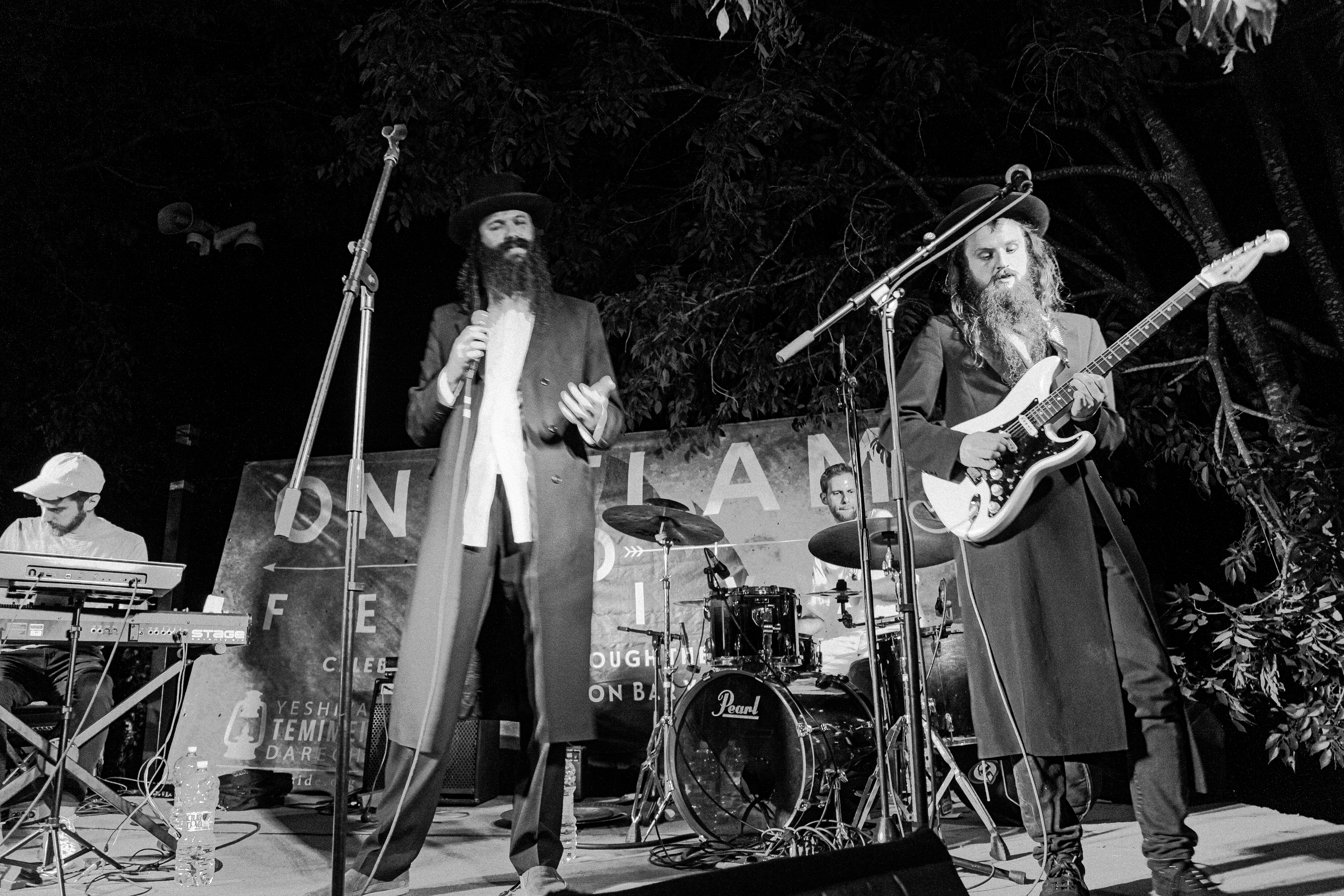
- Gaisin (left) performing with Zusha in 2019.

Background information
- Born: Kemp Mill, Maryland
- Genres: Jewish rock; alternative; jazz; folk; soul
- Occupations: Singer, songwriter
- Instruments: Vocals; saxophone; guitar; piano
- Years active: 2004–present
- Member of: Zusha
- Formerly of: JudaBlue

Shlomo Ari Gaisin is an American singer and songwriter. He is best known as the lead singer for the Hasidic folk group Zusha. He was also lead singer for the defunct Jewish rock band JudaBlue.

== Early life ==
Gaisin grew up in Kemp Mill, Maryland, the youngest of seven children. His parents, who both became baalei teshuva before he was born, were founding members of the Kemp Mill Synagogue, a local Modern Orthodox shul. They also played instruments at home and exposed him to classical music early on. He studied jazz for seven years as a child.

Gaisin attended Melvin J. Berman Hebrew Academy through high school, graduating in 2009. After spending a year in Jerusalem at Yeshivat Netiv Aryeh, he attended Yeshiva University, though he later left to study nutrition. As a student, he experienced difficulty reading and writing and often required extra time on tests.

== Career ==
=== JudaBlue (2004–2013) ===
While in seventh grade at Berman, Gaisin met classmate Yaniv Hoffman, a fellow music enthusiast, and began playing with him. They formed JudaBlue in 2004, although they didn't begin rehearsing regularly until 2007.

The band released its debut EP, Forty Days, on January 19, 2010, shortly before going on hiatus to allow Gaisin and Hoffman to study in Israel. When they returned, the band released three more songs, "Falling", "Change", and "Oneness", before Hoffman returned to Israel in 2011 to serve in the IDF.

=== Zusha (2013–present) ===
Gaisin moved to Washington Heights in Manhattan, where he met fellow musicians Elisha Mlotek and Zachariah Goldschmiedt through a mutual friend. The three began playing together and formed Zusha in 2013. Their self-titled debut EP, released on November 28, 2014, reached No. 9 on Billboard's World Albums chart.

== Artistry ==
Writing for Tablet in 2014, Hillel Broder described Gaisin's vocals as "forceful and far-ranging" and "a mix of Chris Martin and Regina Spektor", as well as sonically evoking instruments like guitar and saxophone.

== Other activities ==
Outside of music, Gaisin is a certified mashgiach and provided kosher supervision to a Chinese restaurant in Washington Heights. He has led prayer services at Beth Hamedrash Hagodol and Chevra Ahavas Yisroel. He contributes essays and original music to the Jewish media website Hevria.

== Personal life ==
Gaisin got engaged to Chanalee Elhyani in September 2019, and the couple married in January 2020. When announcing the birth of his second daughter in November 2022 via Zusha's Instagram, it was remarked that Gaisin now had "almost as many kids as albums". Gaisin's father died in 2019, and his death influenced the Zusha album When the Sea Splits.

Gaisin has been a follower of Hasidism since high school and appeared on the Winter 2014 cover of Jewish Action promoting an article about neo-Hasidism. He has expressed a broad admiration for all strains of Hasidism, stating that "there exists in each one a complete form of the holy Baal Shem Tov."

== Discography ==
With JudaBlue

- Forty Days EP (2010)

With Zusha

- Zusha EP (2014)
- Kavana (2016)
- A Colorful World (2017)
- When the Sea Split (2019)
- Open the Gates (2022)
