= Shira Choir =

American Hasidic choir

- Choir
- Founder: Shraga Gold
- Genre: Hasidic music
- Members: 50
- Website: shirachoir.com

Shira Choir is an American Hasidic choir which sings in the genre of Hasidic music. The conductor of the choir is Yoeli Horowitz.

== History ==
=== Founding ===
Shira Choir was established in the United States in 2001 by Shraga Gold, who was also its conductor and is currently involved in its management.

The choir operates mainly in the United States, but also performs in Moscow, Europe and Israel.

In 2010, the choir released an album called Shira Chadasha, in which soloists from the choir sang, including Levi Falkowitz, Beri Weber, and more.

As of 2015, the Shira Choir has about 50 choir members and they perform in different groups every evening and at special events. Additionally, they record for albums and songs of other singers.

=== Collaborations ===
The choir sings on many albums, the most notable of which are: Yiddish Collection and Kissufim by Mordechai Ben David on Shlomo Yehuda Rechnitz's albums. In other albums, only part of the choir members were used, among them Mendy Weiss' Alle Alle.

An interesting collaboration is between the Shira Choir and its Israeli sister choir, the Malchus Choir, where they performed together as part of the Dirshu Siyum Hashas.

In 2013, they performed an acapella version of Psalm 127:1, titled Im Hashem Lo Yivneh Bayis at a bar mitzvah, which went viral and was later remixed by The Kiffness.

== Past choir members ==
- Beri Weber
- Shmueli Ungar
- Shulem Lemmer
- Levi Falkowitz
- Avrum Mordche Schwartz
- Velvel Feldman
- Yumi Lowy
- Yoely Greenfeld
- Shlome Zalman Horowitz

== Discography ==
- Shira Choir Live (vocal), 2003
- L'Chaim Shira, 2008
- Shira Chadasha, 2010
