= Journal of Halacha and Contemporary Society =

Jewish semi-academic journal

The Journal of Halacha and Contemporary Society is a semiannual Orthodox Jewish academic journal published by the Rabbi Jacob Joseph School and edited by Rabbi Benzion Sommerfeld. As its title implies, it is devoted to the interface between halakha (halacha, Jewish law and ethics) and modern society; thus, some articles will discuss how recent scientific developments are viewed by halakha while others may examine modern trends in Jewish life.

Regular contributors include Dr. Fred Rosner on medical issues, Rabbi J. David Bleich, and Rabbi Alfred Cohen. According to the masthead, all articles are vetted by halachic authorities.

The journal also often includes reviews of books on subjects that are relevant to the journal's scope.

== See also ==
- List of theological journals
