= 24Six =

Music streaming service

- Developer: Chaim Weiss
- Type: Music streaming service
- Website: 24six.app

24Six is a Jewish music streaming service developed by Chaim Weiss that provides access to a library of music, podcasts, and videos. It emphasizes content control, allowing users to filter and customize their listening experience based on their preferences. 24Six is available for download on iOS and Android. It also offers dedicated devices.

== History ==
24Six was established in 2023 by Chaim Weiss. The platform aims to cater to religious communities seeking a curated and filtered entertainment experience. The point being to take only Jewish singers and Jewish songs and put it on a music platform that can even then be catered to ultra-orthodox

== Features ==
24Six allows users to create custom playlists, collect favorites, and stream content from various devices. All content is pre-approved to align with the values of its target audience. It has offline listening mode which requires the user to only connect to WiFi occasionally.

24Six has dedicated devices, including the 24Six FamilyPlayer, and the 24Six Solo, which only features music and not video.

== Reception ==
The platform has received mixed reactions. While some appreciate its focus on providing a controlled entertainment environment, others have raised concerns about its alignment with traditional values.

In December 2022, TAG International released a statement criticizing the 24Six media player, calling it "a step in the wrong direction". Additionally, some rabbinical authorities in Lakewood issued a kol koreh (public proclamation) banning the use of the platform.
