= Jewish Action =

American Orthodox Jewish magazine

Jewish Action is an American Orthodox Jewish magazine published by the Orthodox Union.

The magazine generally presents a Modern Orthodox viewpoint, and covers "topics of interest to an international Orthodox Jewish audience", including articles "related to current ongoing issues of Jewish life and experience, human-interest features, poetry, art, music and book reviews, historical pieces and humor".

Published since 1940, it is published quarterly, with a special Passover issue. Its regular quarterly editions have a mail readership of 50,000, and its Passover issue has a distribution of 100,000. Though generally sold via mail subscription, it is also distributed through retail stores and food outlets throughout North America.

A 148-page book The Jewish Action Reader was published in 1995.

The magazine's website contains PDF copies of previous issues dating back to 1998.

As of 1984, Mordechai Schiller was the editor. Rabbi Matis Greenblatt was the literary editor. The editor was Nechama Carmel as of 2011.

== Topics ==
The Summer 5777/2017 issue included a short follow-up to a Winter 5776/2016 article about the Minhag of standing for the groom, and then a bit later, for the bride, as they enter the room where the wedding ceremony occurs. The writer challenged readers married more than 30 years to look at their wedding album "Most likely you will not see anyone standing while you and your spouse walked down the aisle", and closed by calling it "a fascinating demonstration of how minhagim evolve".
