= Beri Weber =

American singer

- Born: Shmiel Ber Weber; 1984 (age 41–42); Williamsburg, Brooklyn, New York, US
- Genres: Contemporary Jewish religious music
- Occupation: Singer
- Years active: 2007–present
- Website: http://www.beriweber.com

Shmiel Ber Weber, stage name Beri Weber (Hebrew: בערי וובר), is an American contemporary Jewish religious singer, songwriter, and educator. He has been described as "the heir to Mordechai Ben David".

== Early life ==
Shmiel Ber Weber was born in 1984 and grew up in a Pupa Hasidic family in Williamsburg, Brooklyn. He began singing at the age of 9 although his career did not start until the release of his first album in 2007.

== Musical career ==
As a singer and songwriter, Weber is self-taught. His stage name, "Beri Weber", was coined by fellow singer Lipa Schmeltzer. He began singing professionally under the guidance of producer Naftali Schnitzler, and then became a member of the Shira Choir before going solo.

In 2016 Weber released the album Agudah Achas which was generally well acclaimed by critics. In 2017 he produced a music video of the song "Rabi Shimon" from the album Agudah Achas in honor of Rabi Shimon bar Yochai and the festival of Lag BaOmer. Later in the same year he released a single "Vtaher Libeiunu" in advance of the festivals of Rosh Hashanah and Yom Kippur. Weber's 2018 single "Kerestir" also went with the Kerestir Challenge, this calling for people to film themselves performing a section of the tune. The challenge was described by Matzav as "going viral" among the Jewish community.

== Teaching career ==
Weber is the rosh yeshiva of Yeshivas Kochvei Ohr, a yeshiva for boys aged 15 to 19 in Monsey, New York geared towards Hasidic students who don't fit into the regular yeshiva system.

== Personal life ==
Although raised in a Pupa Hasidic family, in later life Weber moved away from Pupa and now identifies with the Breslov Hasidic movement. As a Breslover he travels to Uman, Ukraine, on Rosh Hashanah and leads the prayer service for several thousand worshippers. He is also a student of Rabbi Yitzchok "Itche" Meyer Morgenstern. He and his wife and children reside in Spring Valley, New York.

== Discography ==
=== Albums ===
- Be'ezras Hashem Yisburach (2007)
- Farbrengen
- Farbrengen 2
- Ben Melech (2014)
- Thank You Hashem (2011)
- One Heart (2016)
- Agudah Achas (2016)
- A Shabbos Farbrengen (2017)
- Asarah Minei Negina (2018)
- Korban (2022)
- Beri Energy (2024)

=== Singles ===
- "Tateh" (2014)
- "Chabatzkapella" (2014)
- "Va'ani Tefilusi" (2015)
- "Rabienu" (2016)
- "Vtaher Libeinu" (2017)
- "Kerestir" (2018)
- "Hamelech" (2022)
- "Lehisvada" (2023)
