= Smino discography =

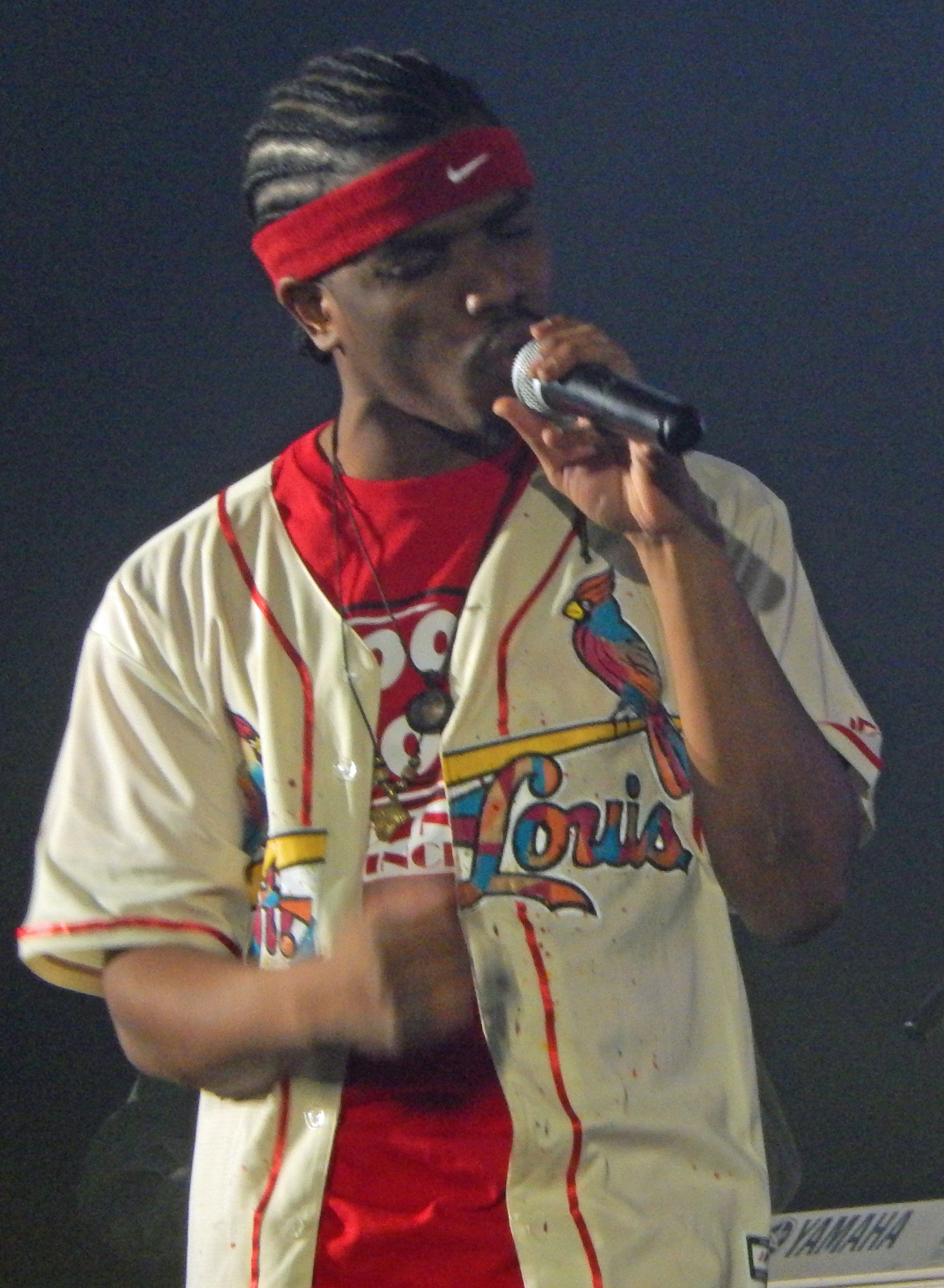
- Studio albums: 4
- EPs: 4
- Singles: 20
- Music videos: 14
- Mixtapes: 2

The discography of Smino, an American rapper, consists of four studio albums, four EPs, three Mixtapes, twenty singles (including 50 as a featured artist and guest appearances), and 14 music videos.

== Albums ==
=== Studio albums ===
List of albums, with album details and selected chart positions
Title	Album details	Peak chart positions
Title	Album details	US
blkswn	Released: March 14, 2017; Label: Zero Fatigue, Downtown; Format: CD, digital download, vinyl	—
Noir	Released: November 8, 2018; Label: Zero Fatigue, Downtown, Interscope; Format: digital download	191
Luv 4 Rent	Released: October 28, 2022; Label: Zero Fatigue, Motown; Format: CD, digital download, vinyl	50
Maybe in Nirvana	Released: December 6, 2024; Label: Zero Fatigue, Motown; Format: CD, digital download, vinyl	—

== Extended plays ==
Title	Details
S!Ck S!Ck S!Ck	Released: October 2, 2015; Label: Zero Fatigue; Format: Digital download
blkjuptr	Released: December 11, 2015; Label: Zero Fatigue; Format: Digital download
4sport	Released: July 9, 2018; Format: Digital download
High 4 Da Highladays	Released: December 23, 2019; Label: Zero Fatigue, Downtown, Interscope; Format: Digital download

== Mixtape ==
Title	Album details
Smeezy Dot Com	Released: April 25, 2012; Format: Digital download
Retail (with Bari Allen)	Released: June 15, 2013; Format: Digital download
She Already Decided	Released: April 20, 2020; Format: Digital download

== Singles ==
=== As lead artist ===
List of singles as lead artist, showing year released and album name
Title	Year	Album
"blkjuptr"	2016	blkjuptr
"Oxygen"	2016	blkjuptr
"blkswn"	2016	blkswn
"Anita"	2017	blkswn
"Anita (Remix)" (featuring T-Pain)	2017	Non-album single
"Netflix & Dusse"	2017	blkswn
"Wild Irish Roses"	2018	blkswn
"L.M.F."	2018	NØIR
"Klink"	2018	NØIR
"Z4L" (featuring Bari & Jay2)	2019	NØIR
"Reverend"	2019	Non-album single
"Trina"	2019	Non-album single
"Tempo"	2020	Non-album single
"Baguetti" (with JID & Kenny Beats)	2020	Non-album single
"Backstage Pass" (with Monte Booker and The Drums)	2020	Madden NFL 21
"MLK Dr"	2021	Non-album single
"Rice & Gravy" (with Monte Booker)	2021	Non-album single
"I Deserve" (featuring NOS.)	2021	Non-album single
"90 Proof" (with J. Cole)	2022	Luv 4 Rent
"Matinee"	2022	Luv 4 Rent

=== As featured artist ===
List of singles as a featured artist, showing year released and album name
Title	Year	Album
"Kolors" (Monte Booker featuring Smino)	2016	Soulection White Label - Monte Booker
"World in My Hands" (Saba featuring Smino & LEGIT)	2016	Bucket List Project
"TenderHeaded" (Cam O'bi featuring Smino)	2018	Grown Ass Kid
"TROOP" (tobi lou featuring Smino)	2018	Non-album single
"Khlorine" (Sango featuring Smino)	2018	In The Comfort Of
"Bad Boys" (Pivot Gang featuring Saba, Joseph Chilliams, MfnMelo & Smino)	2019	You Can't Sit with Us
"Homegirl" (Leven Kali featuring Smino & Topaz Jones)	2019	HIGHTIDE
"Dragonball Durag (Remix)" (Thundercat featuring Smino & Guapdad 4000)	2020	It Is What It Is
"BET Uncut" (MadeinTYO featuring Chance the Rapper & Smino)	2020	Never Forgotten
"So.Incredible.pkg" (Denzel Curry and Robert Glasper featuring Smino)	2021	Unlocked 1.5
"Louie Bag" (Yebba featuring Smino)	2021	Dawn
"Right Track" (Syd featuring Smino)	2021	Broken Hearts Club
"Avalance" (reggie featuring Smino)	2021	TBA
"2 seater" (Tiana Major9 featuring Smino)	2022	Fool Me Once
"I Won't Tell" (Baby Rose featuring Smino)	2023	Through and Through
"Tree" (Chance the Rapper featuring Lil Wayne and Smino)	2025	Star Line
"Stadium Coupe" (Umair featuring Calm and Smino)	2026	Non-album single

=== Guest appearances ===
List of non-single guest appearances, with other performing artists, showing year released and album name
Title	Year	Other artist(s)	Album
"Touch The Ceiling"	2012	Bari Allen	YDOC
"Money Man"	2015	NAPALM	Life as a Bachelor
"Money Like a Pastor"	2015	Gdot Markee, Corban Josiah	Chicken Money
"Don't Kall My Name"	2015	Jean Deaux	Non-album single
"XYZ"	2016	Jean Deaux	Non-album single
"Shadow Man"	2016	Noname, Saba, Phoelix	Telefone
"No Cape"	2016	Sean Deaux	Vice City 2
"Kompany"	2017	Monte Booker, Phoelix	Non-album single
"Spice (Remix)"	2017	Ravyn Lenae	Non-album single
"The Run Around"	2018	Ambi Lyrics	Study Hall
"Taranphoeno"	2018	Phoelix, Jean Deaux	TEMPO
"Intrigue"	2018	Bari Allen	The Prefix
"Ace"	2018	Noname, Saba	Room 25
"Exhale"	2018	Kemba	Gilda
"Blood on My Hands"	2019	August 8	Happy Endings with an Asterisk
"1993"	2019	Buddy, Cozz, EarthGang, JID, J. Cole	Revenge of the Dreamers III
"Sacrifices"	2019	EarthGang, J. Cole, Saba	Revenge of the Dreamers III
"Dork"	2019	Jay2	4 Tha Wait
"Eternal"	2019	Chance the Rapper	The Big Day
"Anonymous"	2019	Cousin Stizz	Trying to Find My Next Thrill
"LA Lisa"	2019	SiR	Chasing Summer
"Rap City"	2019	femdot.	94 Camry Music
"Won't Bite"	2019	Doja Cat	Hot Pink
"Spin Move"	2020	Bas, Saba, The Hics	Revenge of the Dreamers III: Director's Cut
"Passcode"	2020	Ari Lennox, Buddy, Mez, Guapdad 4000	Revenge of the Dreamers III: Director's Cut
"I Been (Remix)"	2020	Ari Lennox	Shea Butter Baby (Remix EP)
"Gimme The Wheel"	2020	Alina Baraz	It Was Divine
"gucci slides"	2020	Ambré	Pulp (Director's Cut)
"Plead The .45th"	2021	Saba	Judas and the Black Messiah: The Inspired Album
"Claymore"	2021	Isaiah Rashad	The House Is Burning
"Mo' Liquor"	2021	Kari Faux	Lowkey Superstar
"Scenic Drive"	2021	Khalid, Ari Lennox	Scenic Drive
"Still"	2022	Saba, 6lack	Few Good Things
"God Body"	2022	Lucky Daye	Candydrip
"3D"	2022	Ravyn Lenae	Hypnos
"Can't Get Over You"	2022	Westside Boogie, Teezo Touchdown	More Black Superheroes
"Ambeyoncé"	2022	EarthGang	Ghetto Gods (Deluxe)

== Music videos ==
=== As lead artist ===
List of music videos as lead artist, showing year released and director(s)
Title	Year	Director(s)
"blkjuptr"	2016	Jacob Chavez
"Anita"	2017	Jean Deaux
"Netflix & Dusse"	2017	Calmatic
"Anita (Remix)" (featuring T-Pain)	2017	—N/a
"Wild Irish Roses"	2018	Jean Deaux
"L.M.F."	2018	—N/a
"Z4L" (featuring Bari & Jay2)	2019	Ev Solomon
"Klink"	2019	Smino, Nicholas Woytuk
"Trina"	2019	Child
"Reverend"	2020	Topshotta
"Cabbage (Freestyle)"	2020	—N/a
"S.A.D. Lil Intro"	2020	—N/a
"MLK Dr"	2021	Smino & Brick
"I Deserve" (featuring NOS.)	2021	Smino

=== As featured artist ===
List of music videos as lead artist, showing year released and director(s)
Title	Year	Director(s)
"World In My Hands" (Saba featuring Smino & LEGIT)	2017	Tom Vin
"TROOP" (tobi lou featuring Smino)	2018	Glassface
"Khlorine" (Sango featuring Smino)	2018	Glassface
"Sacrifices" (Dreamville featuring EarthGang, J. Cole, Smino & Saba)	2019	Scott Lazer, David Peters, and Chad Tennies
"Homegirl" (Leven Kali featuring Smino & Topaz Jones)	2020	Alexandra Gaville
"BET Uncut" (MadeinTYO featuring Chance the Rapper & Smino)	2020	David "FilthyMcDave" Hightower
"Louie Bag" (Yebba featuring Smino)	2021	

== Production discography ==
=== 2011 ===
Bari Allen - Young, Dumb, and Outta Control

- 01. Comp
- 02. O.C.
- 03. Wheel of Fortune
- 04. Watch Me Explode
- 05. Byrd & Magic
- 06. Camron
- 07. Juiced
- 08. Diamond Kuts
- 09. Purple
- 10. Faded Foreva
- 11. Silver Gun
- 12. Touch The Ceiling (ft. C. Smi)

=== 2012 ===
Chris Smith Jr - Smeezy Dot Com

- 01. "Solar"
- 02. "Smeezy Dot Com"
- 03. "Who is Dude"
- 04. "Kill"
- 05. "Yves Saint Louis"
- 06. "Tha Man"
- 07. "Sara Lee (Interlude)"
- 08. "Juicin'"
- 09. "Overdose"
- 10. "Heaven on Mars"
- 11. "Bombay" (with Bari Allen)

=== 2013 ===
Chris Smith Jr & Bari Allen - Retail

- 01. "Clientle"
- 02. "The Spekulation"
- 03. "Werk"
- 04. "Mind Bleed"
- 05. "Uza Nigga"
- 06. "Slow Burn"
- 07. "Wett"
- 08. "Vanity"
- 09. "Purgatory"
- 10. "No Limit (Interlude)"
- 11. "Flawless P"
- 12. "Sweet Jesus"
- 13. "Goin Krazy"
- 14. "The Growth"

=== 2018 ===
Smino - 4sport

- 02. "coupe se' yern"

Smino - New Coupe, Who Dis? - Single

- 00. "New Coupe, Who Dis?" (featuring Mick Jenkins)

Bari - The Prefix

- 03. "Intrigue" (featuring Smino) (produced with Monte Booker)

Jean Deaux - Krash

- 05. "Energy / Who-U" (featuring Ravyn Lenae) (produced with Phoelix & ROMderful)

Smino - NØIR

- 15. "Krushed Ice" (featuring Valee)
- 17. "MF Groove" (featuring Ravyn Lenae)

=== 2021 ===
Maxo Kream - Weight of the World

- 16. "Believe" (featuring Don Toliver) (produced with Monte Booker)
