= Maybe in Nirvana =

Studio album by Smino
- Released: December 6, 2024
- Recorded: 2020
- Genre: Hip hop
- Length: 28:55
- Label: Zero Fatigue
- Producer: Groove; Jared Scharff; Kenny Beats; Monte Booker; Nathan Foley; Nice Rec; Phoelix; Sango; Teej; Thundercat

Smino chronology
Luv 4 Rent (2022)	Maybe in Nirvana (2024)

Maybe in Nirvana is the fourth studio album by American rapper Smino. Written and recorded throughout 2020, prior to the COVID-19 pandemic and the creation of Luv 4 Rent, the album was released on December 6, 2024, under Zero Fatigue. It also features ten tracks, with guest appearances from Bun B, Ravyn Lenae, Thundercat and Reggie. Maybe in Nirvana is Smino's first independently-released album.

== Background ==
On October 28, 2022, Smino released his third album, Luv 4 Rent, through his Zero Fatigue label, under license to Motown. Seven months later, in May 2023, Smino tweeted about a deluxe version of the album, revealing that the reissue would be "actually a whole new album" that would possibly feature 12 new songs. Between 2023 and 2024, Smino would release loose singles and freestyles, also initially planning to release a sequel to his mixtape She Already Decided mixtape entitled She Always Dancing on April 20, 2023. Months after the release of the non-album singles "Mister Misfit but Ain't Missed a Fit in Months" and "Polynesian", Smino would officially announce his fourth album to be entitled Maybe in Nirvana, in an interview with Sway Calloway on his radio show Sway in the Morning. He explained that the album was made before Luv 4 Rent as a "closure project" for the time, and that he would never be at peace if he did not release this album.

The album's artwork and tracklist was revealed on December 2, 2024, four days prior to its release.

== Track listing ==
Maybe in Nirvana track listing
No.	Title	Writer(s)	Producer(s)	Length
1.	"Intro"	Christopher Smith Jr.		0:35
2.	"Dear Fren"	Smith Jr.; Benjamin Tolbert; Peter Mudge; Michael Neil	Groove; Nice Rec; Phoelix	3:02
3.	"Ready Set Goku"	Smith Jr.; Kenneth Blume III; Jared Scharff	Kenny Beats; Scharff	2:35
4.	"Maybe in Nirvana"	Smith Jr.; Ahmanti Booker; Neil	Monte Booker; Phoelix	2:57
5.	"Lee"	Smith Jr.; Tolbert	Groove	2:14
6.	"Tequan" (featuring Ravyn Lenae)	Smith Jr.; Ravyn Lenae Washington; Tolbert; Nathan Foley; Booker	Groove; Foley; Booker	4:45
7.	"NSYNC"	Smith Jr.; Tolbert; Afolabi Osinulu	Groove; Teej	2:26
8.	"Ms. Joyce" (featuring Bun B)	Smith Jr.; Bernard Freeman; Kai Asa Savon Wright; Neil	Sango; Phoelix	4:38
9.	"Hoe-Nouns" (featuring Thundercat and Reggie)	Smith Jr.; Stephen Bruner; Reginald Helms Jr.; Tolbert	Thundercat; Groove	2:55
10.	"Glo-Fi" (featuring Ravyn Lenae)	Smith Jr.; Washington; Booker	Booker	2:43
Total length:				28:55
