= Noir (Smino album) =

NØIR

Studio album by Smino
- Released: November 8, 2018
- Recorded: 2017–18
- Studio: Classick Studios
- Genres: Hip-hop; neo soul; electro funk; jazz fusion; R&B
- Length: 58:46
- Labels: Zero Fatigue; Downtown; Interscope
- Producers: Smino; Monte Booker; Sango; THEMpeople; Phoelix; Krs; Al B Smoov; Da-P; J.L.L; deDunamis

Smino chronology
blkswn (2017)	NØIR (2018)	She Already Decided (2020)

Singles from NØIR
- 1. "L.M.F." Released: October 26, 2018; 2. "Klink" Released: November 4, 2018; 3. "Z4L" Released: April 3, 2019

Noir (stylized as NØIR) is the second studio album by American rapper Smino. It was released on November 8, 2018, with Zero Fatigue under license to Downtown Records and distributed by Interscope Records.

The album includes guest appearances from Zero Fatigue members, Bari, Jay2, and Ravyn Lenae, as well as Dreezy, and Valee. The production came from himself, Monte Booker, Sango, THEMpeople, Phoelix, Krs, Al B Smoov, and Da-P. The artwork of the album was designed by Victor Birriel and taken by Nolis Anderson. The album debuted at number 191 on the US Billboard 200.

== Background ==
As a follow-up to his debut album, Smino said in an interview with Rolling Stone that his vision for his sophomore release was "I just didn’t want to make the same album. The music sounds fun as hell. I ain’t gonna say what it is and what it ain’t. It’s raw as fuck." When asked about being patient with his releases, he said "I’m more of an album artist. I got some shit. I ain’t aiming at the radio. It change so much, if you aim for it, you be behind. It’s running targets. Shoot ahead of them bitches."

== Singles and promotion ==
On October 26, 2018, Smino released a single titled "L.M.F." produced by Sango, accompanied by a music video. On October 29, Smino released a freestyle (later titled "Braniak") to announce the title and release date of his sophomore studio album. Following the announcement of NØIR, Smino released the album's second single titled "Klink" produced by Monte Booker, on November 4. On April 3, 2019, Smino released the music video for "Z4L", directed by Ev Solomon and produced by AJR Films, with clips of backstage footage on tour. On June 5, the official music video for "Klink" was released and was co-directed by Smino and Nicholas Woytuk of Kamp Grizzly.

=== Tours ===
In 2019, Smino announced the Hoopti Tour, which included 33 shows in England, the United States, and Canada, beginning in March and concluding in May. Supporting acts for the tour were EarthGang and Phoelix. On November 9, 2020, two years after the album's release, Smino released the documentary Hoopti Tour Live in Brooklyn Steel. It was directed by Harrison A. W. Corwin and Barrington, and includes behind-the-scenes footage, and live performances of the setlist in Brooklyn Steel.

== Critical reception ==
Professional ratings
Review scores
Source	Rating
Consequence of Sound	B−
Highsnobiety	3.5/5 stars
HipHopDX	4.1/5 stars
Pitchfork	7.6/10 stars

The album was met with positive reviews from critics. In a one listen review, Yoh Phillips of DJ Booth said "artistically, the music sounds like the rightful successor to blkswn. He doesn’t repeat any tricks; NOIR is an entirely new playbook but written with the consideration of what his audience knows him for: melodic and warm songs riddled with sharp-witted lyricism." HotNewHipHop praised the genre-blending music saying "the eclectic artist blends neo-soul with hip-hop to create his own sound, one that elevates NØIR to the next level. After the success of his debut album blkswn in early 2017, Smino has been garnering a loyal fan base with intimate shows and impassioned appearances. NØIR features the same passion and intimacy, with a pinch of southern soul and a hint of midwest sophistication." Aaron Williams of Uproxx claimed "Smino has also swerved away from the glossier beats Nelly would commission from the likes of The Neptunes in favor of in-house, Dungeon Family-esque beats swimming in jazz and funk influences that complemented his hazy contemplation on his debut album, Blkswn."

Jay Balfour from Pitchfork claimed the album is lighter, more fun, and more versatile than his debut album saying "NOIR is above all an album about language: Smino throws a million different voices into the mix, sometimes all at once. His default singing voice—which he uses to rap as well—is weightless and honeyed to the point that it’s hard to tell if he’s in a falsetto." He continued to say "there are moments when he turns morose, clenches his fist, and sings explicitly about his Blackness." Thomas Hobbs from Highsnobiety said "Smino has a commitment to destroying the idea of a comfort zone and this should be applauded, especially in an era where certain artists put out the same album over and over again." Riley Wallace for HipHopDX also praised the album, saying, "Smino remains one of those artists that has managed to do almost the unthinkable in today’s industry, be himself."

=== Accolades ===
Publication	Accolade	Rank
Complex	Best Albums of 2018	22
Revolt	11 Best Rap Albums of 2018	9
The Atlantic	The 23 Best Albums of 2018	—N/a
The Ringer	Best Albums of 2018	7

== Track listing ==
No.	Title	Writer(s)	Producer(s)	Length
1.	"Kovert"	Christopher Smith Jr.	Smino; THEMpeople	4:39
2.	"L.M.F."	Smith Jr.; Craig David; M. Leslie Hill; Kai Wright	Sango	3:09
3.	"Klink"	Smith Jr.; Ahmanti Booker	Monte Booker	3:02
4.	"Tequila Mockingbird"	Smith Jr.; Christopher Allen; Martel Howard; Jean-Andre Lawrence	Krs; J.L.L; deDunamis	3:00
5.	"Spinz"	Smith Jr.; Booker	Monte Booker	3:50
6.	"Summer Salt" (featuring Bari)	Smith Jr.; Booker; Jabari Allen	Monte Booker	2:28
7.	"Z4L" (featuring Bari & Jay2)	Smith Jr.; Booker; Jabari Allen; Jeffrey Smith	Monte Booker	2:43
8.	"Merlot"	Smith Jr.; Booker	Monte Booker	2:55
9.	"We Got The Biscuits"	Smith Jr.; Booker	Monte Booker	4:29
10.	"Hoopti"	Smith Jr.; Chris McClenney; Kai Wright	Sango; Chris McClenney	2:35
11.	"Pizano"	Smith Jr.; Alec Tolkin	Al B Smoov	3:15
12.	"Low Down Derrty Blues"	Smith Jr.; Booker	Monte Booker	3:16
13.	"Fenty Sex" (featuring Dreezy)	Smith Jr.; Booker; Seandrea Sledge	Monte Booker	3:35
14.	"Bam 2x"	Smith Jr.; Booker	Monte Booker	2:55
15.	"Krushed Ice" (featuring Valee)	Smith Jr.; Valee Taylor	Smino	2:43
16.	"Skedos"	Smith Jr.; Michael E. Neil	Phoelix	2:46
17.	"MF Groove" (featuring Ravyn Lenae)	Smith Jr.; Ravyn Lenae Washington	Smino	4:07
18.	"Verizon"	Smith Jr.; Booker; Pharenz Abellard	Monte Booker; Da-P	3:28
Total length:				58:46

Notes

- Every song is stylized in all capital letters, e.g. "KOVERT"

== Personnel ==
- Smino – vocals, production
- Monte Booker – production
- Bari – vocals
- Jay2 – vocals
- Dreezy – vocals
- Valee – vocals
- Ravyn Lenae – vocals
- Sango – production
- Krs – production
- THEMpeople – production
- Al B Smoov – production
- Phoelix – production, additional instrumentation
- Da-P – production
- Chris McClenney – keys
- Loona – additional vocals
- Erik Hunter – additional bass
- Raphael Schaeffer – additional drum
- Victor Birriel – artwork
- Nolis Anderson – artwork
- Elton "L10MixedIt" Chueng – engineering, mixing, mastering

== Charts ==
Chart (2018)	Peak position
US Billboard 200	191
