= Nyota Parker =

Hip Hop & Neo Soul, Singer Songwriter

- Born: March 28, 2000 (age 26); Dublin
- Origin: Dublin, Ireland
- Genre: Hip-hop
- Occupations: Rapper, singer, songwriter
- Years active: 2016-present
- Label: Independent

Nyota Parker (born March 28, 2000) is a Congolese and Irish hip hop and neo-soul rapper, singer, and songwriter from Cape Town, South Africa.

She first became known for her 2023 singles, "Alright" (with YAMA//SATO) and "Like This", which caught the attention of online tabloid Collect Everything Collective. In an article on her, they described Parker's talent and mention her being a multifaceted artist.

Her follow-up single, "The Cycle", spawned a series of features with various artists and one notably, Jay Jody. Jay and Nyota would later release another song titled "Worth It".

She later appeared on the Official Audio Streaming Chart of Apple Music as Apple Music's Up Next' Artist of 2024 in South Africa. She been noticed by other online platforms including: Thisis50, Rolling Stone, Slikour On Life, Canvas Rebel, and Ear Milk.

Her performance at Le Phoque Off music festival led to her sharing the stage with acts such as Ayra Starr, Nas, Thundercat, and many more at The 45th Edition of Montreal International Jazz Festival on July 2nd 2025.

== Early life ==
Parker was born on March 28, 2000, in Dublin. She graduated from the International School of Cape Town. She started writing and recording her music when she was 16 years old after she had learnt how to sing and rap, around the age of 13 years old.

She moved around. From South Africa, at the age of five years old, to New York City at the age of 19 and then to Montreal at the age of 25.

She was raised by a single mother (Ilunga Ange Bukasa). She first performanced at "Summer In July" in 2016 as an opener for A-Reece and Nasty C. Her producer and long time friend Jay Loopz has been there during her musical journey as well as mastering and mixing her music.

== Career ==
In 2022 Glamour Magazine talks about Nyota Parker as "A smooth South African rapper, vocalist and songwriter who always captures the hearts and ears of her listeners with her mature voice and music, tackling emotional issues and healing". In 2022 Nyota features in a Converse campaign to promote creatives. Fans received her well at the Williamsburg Hall of Music during her performance in 2025 (July). Williamsburg Hall of Music is well known for hosting big names like Steve Lacy, The Linda Lindas and many more.

== Discography ==
=== Studio albums ===
- Worth it (2025)
- SOULLESS (2024)
- MIDST (2024)
- Intrusive Thoughts (2024)
- Spectrum (deluxe) (2022)
- Spectrum (2021)
- WHAT IS A TIMELINE? (2026)
