= Brooklyn Steel =

Live music venue in Brooklyn, New York

Coordinates: 40.719366°N 73.938783°W

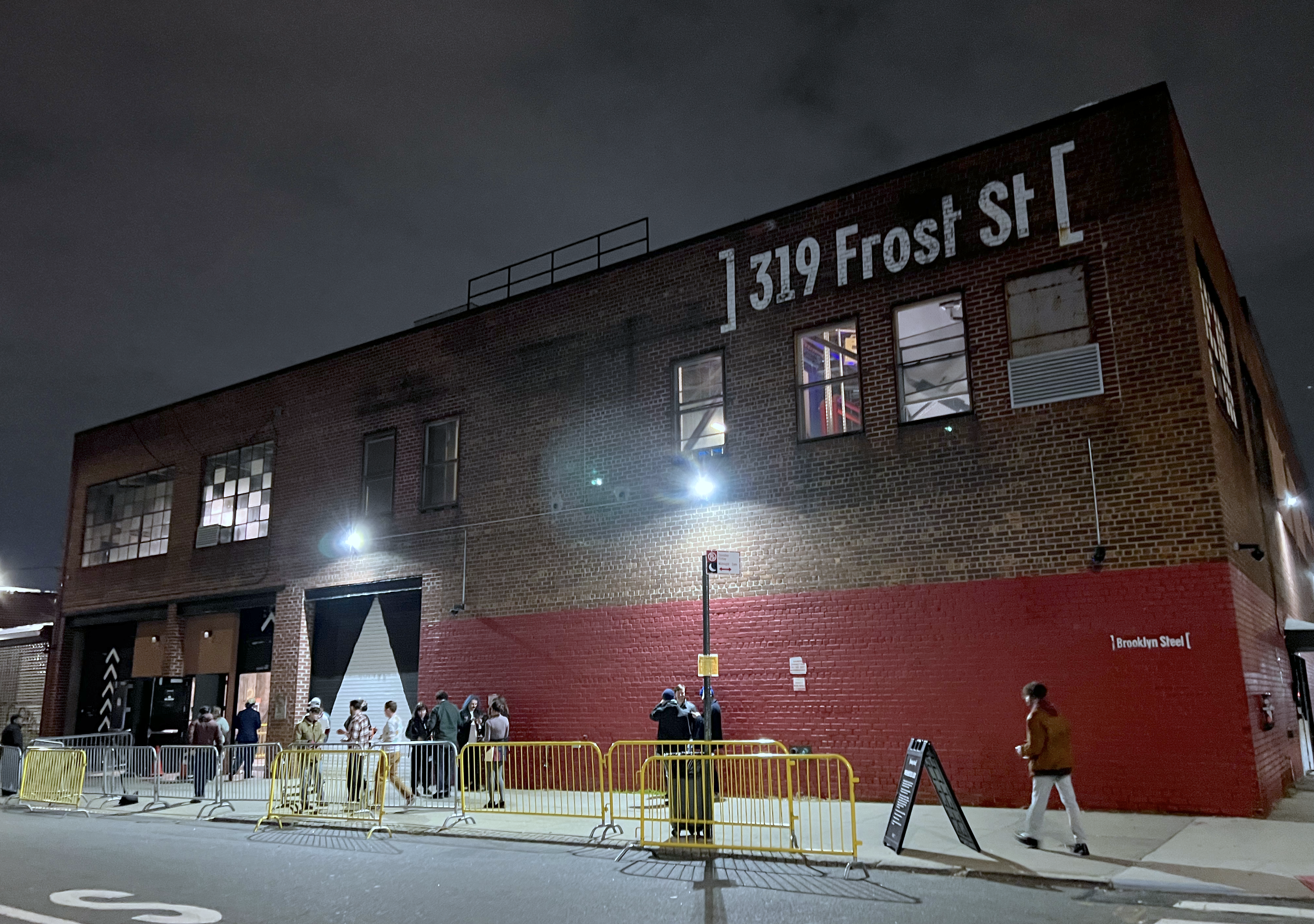
- The exterior of Brooklyn Steel
- Interactive map of Brooklyn Steel
- Address: 319 Frost Street
- Location: Brooklyn, New York, U.S.
- Operator: The Bowery Presents
- Capacity: 1,800
- Type: Music venue

Construction
- Built: July 2016–March 2017
- Opened: April 6, 2017

Website
- bowerypresents.com

Brooklyn Steel is a music venue in Brooklyn, New York which opened in 2017.

Rolling Stone named Brooklyn Steel one of the 10 best live music venues in America. Bookings are managed by AEG, using its AXS ticketing platform.

== History ==
The name of the venue was inspired by the fact that the building was originally used as a steel manufacturing plant. Much of the steel from the original building was repurposed for the venue. The venue contains a main floor, a balcony, forty restrooms, and three bars.

Construction for the venue began in July 2016, and it opened on April 6, 2017, with a five-night run of sold-out concerts by American rock band LCD Soundsystem. On June 22, 2017, LCD Soundsystem became the first artist to play 10 shows at Brooklyn Steel.

Wild Nothing was the first artist to release a live album recorded at the venue; the band's November 2018 show was recorded as the Live at Brooklyn Steel album, released on September 27, 2019.

LCD Soundsystem announced a 20-show residency at Brooklyn Steel from November 23 to December 21, 2021. It was the band's first concerts since 2018. However, the final three shows were canceled on December 19 because of rising COVID-19 cases in New York City as a result of the Omicron variant. The band initially did not want to cancel the concerts because nearly half of the tickets were bought by people outside of New York City who travelled to see them, but said they would if enough people asked for their tickets to be refunded.

LCD Soundsystem announced another 20-show Brooklyn Steel residency in 2022, from November 18 to December 17, with priority given to those who canceled their 2021 tickets because of the Omicron variant. In 2023, LCD Soundsystem played a 12-show New York City residency in November and December as the "Tri Boro Tour", of which four of those concerts were held at Brooklyn Steel.

Pavement played four consecutive nights at Brooklyn Steel from September 11–14, 2023.

Car Seat Headrest released the live album Faces from the Masquerade on December 8, 2023, a double album consisting of footage from three consecutive sold-out Brooklyn Steel shows that the band played in March 2022.

== Critical reception ==
At opening, the venue was "easy to see…quickly becoming yet another Williamsburg cultural beacon". Media also compared the venue to Manhattan's Terminal 5, which is also operated by The Bowery Presents. Both venues are "effectively one big tall box" and Terminal 5 appeared to serve as a guide for Brooklyn Steel's construction.

== Performers ==
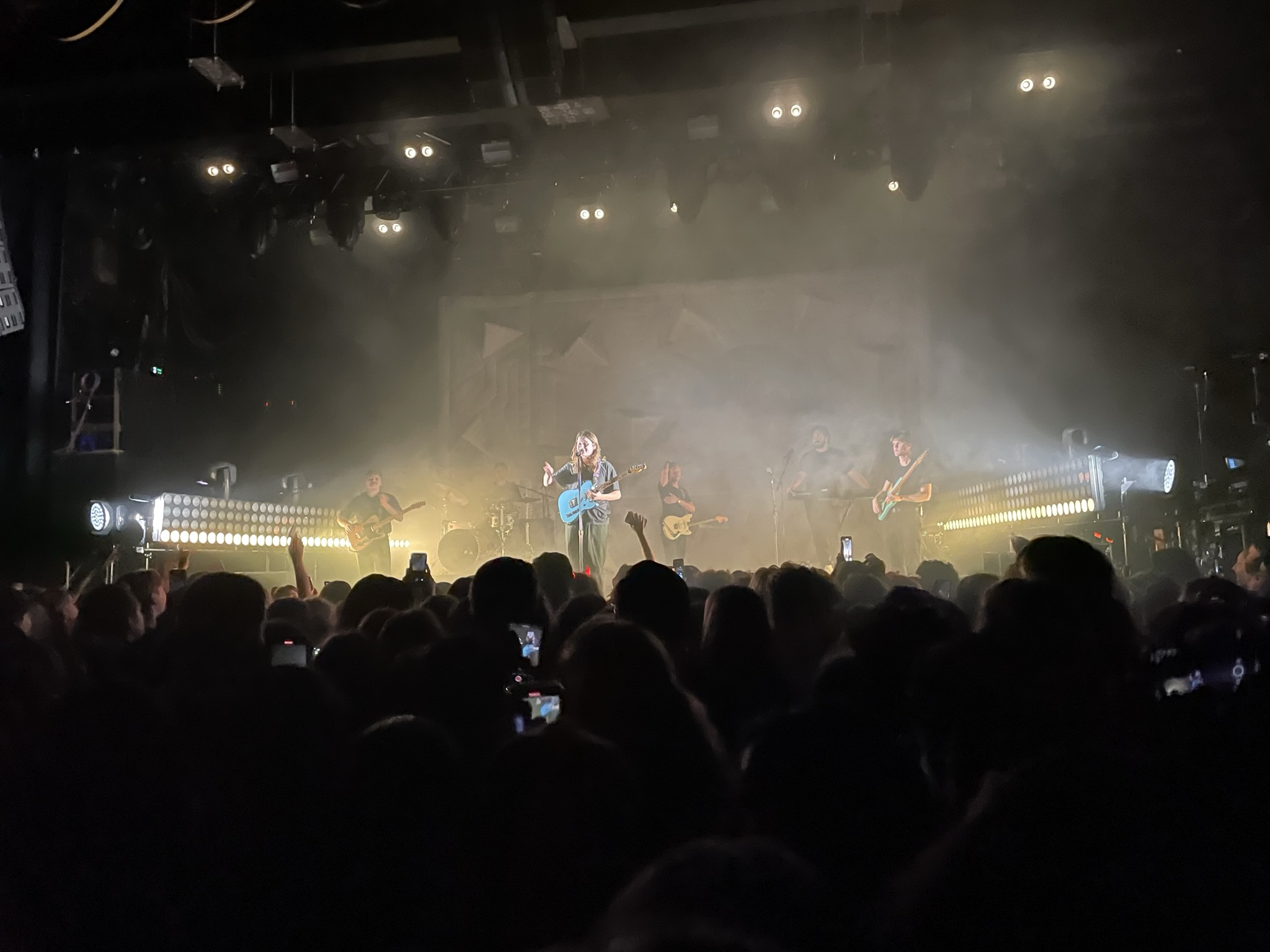
Girl in Red performing at Brooklyn Steel in 2022

Since the venue's opening in April 2017, musical acts have performed at the venue including Tiffany Young, Maren Morris, LCD Soundsystem, PJ Harvey, Laura Marling, Goldfrapp, Two Door Cinema Club, Regina Spektor, Catfish and the Bottlemen, Marian Hill, Pixies, Godspeed You! Black Emperor, Ween, Perfume Genius, the Decemberists, Nao, SOPHIE, Animal Collective, Sunn O))), Franz Ferdinand, PUP, Wilco, MIKA, Theo Katzman, Weyes Blood, Chlöe and Arctic Monkeys.
