= Wellmont Theater =

Performance venue in Montclair, New Jersey

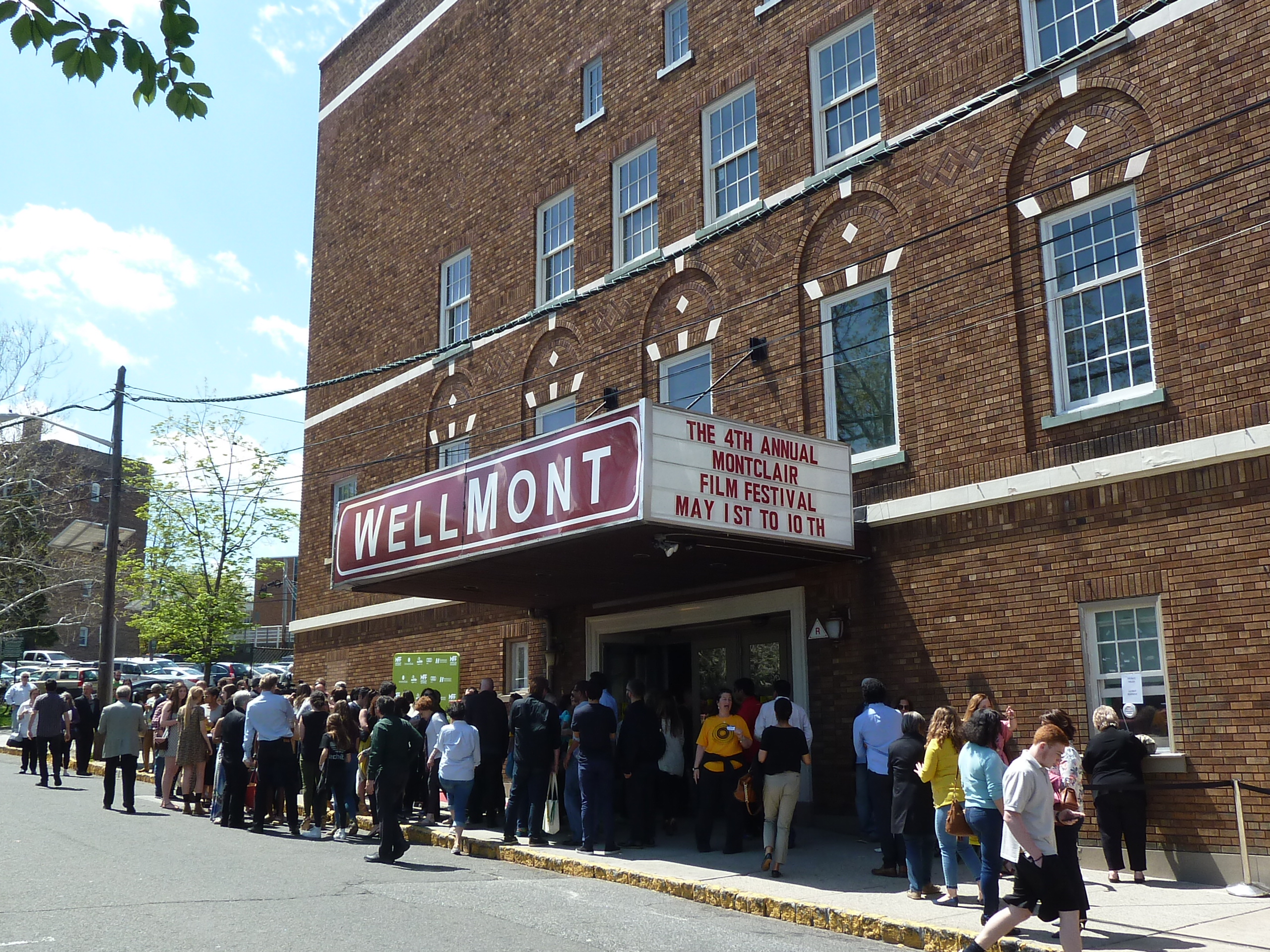
- Exterior of venue (c.2015)
- Interactive map of Wellmont Theater
- Address: 5 Seymour Street; Montclair, New Jersey; United States
- Coordinates: 40.8126°N 74.2166°W
- Owner: The Pinnacle Companies & Greenwood Development
- Operator: Live Nation
- Capacity: 2,500
- Current use: Music Venue

Construction
- Opened: 1922
- Reopened: 2008
- Architects: Reilly & Hall

Website
- www.wellmonttheater.com

The Wellmont Theater is a theater and concert venue located in Montclair, New Jersey, United States. The theater is located on the Wellmon Arts Plaza in downtown Montclair, near the border with neighboring Glen Ridge.

== History ==
The theater opened in 1922 for live entertainment then switched to movies in 1929. In 2008 The Bowery Presents completed a $3 million renovation of the Wellmont Theater designed by architects Brian Swier and Michael Costantin. The building was retrofitted with new electrical and plumbing systems. New bars in the orchestra and mezzanine were installed. In 2013, venue booking changed to Live Nation, after the theater again underwent another careful refurbishment and started hosting major acts like Steely Dan, B.B. King, Cheap Trick, Fetty Wap, Ms. Lauryn Hill, and DNCE.

Palme-d'Or winning director Sean Baker worked at the Wellmont as a projectionist while in high school in the 1980's.

The Wellmont is a venue for the annual Montclair Film Festival.

== See also ==
- List of New Jersey music venues by capacity
