= 90 Proof =

2022 single by Smino and J. Cole

Single by Smino featuring J. Cole

from the album Luv 4 Rent
- Released: September 30, 2022
- Genre: Hip-hop
- Length: 3:28
- Label: Zero Fatigue; Motown
- Songwriters: Christopher Smith Jr.; Jermaine Cole; Nathan Foley; Bola Johnson; Ahmanti Booker; Benjamin Tolbert
- Producers: Groove; Monte Booker

Smino singles chronology
"I Deserve" (2021)	"90 Proof" (2022)	"Matinee" (2022)

J. Cole singles chronology
"London" (2022)	"90 Proof" (2022)	"Procrastination (Broke)" (2023)

Music video
- "90 Proof" on YouTube

"90 Proof" is a song by American rapper Smino featuring fellow American rapper J. Cole, released on September 30, 2022. The song was produced by Groove and Monte Booker, and serves as the lead single from Smino's third studio album, Luv 4 Rent.

== Background ==
"90 Proof" was originally planned to be on J. Cole's album The Fall Off, but Smino later asked for the song back. He explained, "I thought about it and the whole time I knew it would be great for me, being on J. Cole’s album. When I was wrapping up the tracklist, though, I just felt like something was missing, and I put "90 Proof" right after my intro and it just sounded like they were meant for each other. So I just called Cole and asked him if I could get the song back and he let me."

== Composition ==
The song features a "melodic, guitar-laced beat", in which Smino raps in his trademark "fast, expressive helium-cackle". In his verse, he apologizes for his vices that get in the way of his relationships. Meanwhile, J. Cole's verse remains "calm and grounded" with melodies that creep into his delivery.

== Music video ==
The song's music video premiered on November 3, 2022. It was directed by Phillip Youmans, and is described as a "neo-soul hip-hop southern gothic thrill ride". The video sees Smino, J. Cole, and their friends at a seemingly normal party, where shots are heard as the video takes a dark turn.
