= The Bowery Presents =

Music promoter

- Formation: 1994; 32 years ago
- Location: New York City, New York, United States
- Founders: Michael Swier, John Moore
- Website: bowerypresents.com

The Bowery Presents is the East Coast regional partner of AEG Live. It owns and operates multiple venues in New York City, Boston, Philadelphia, New Jersey, Virginia, and Maine. The capacities of the venues operated by The Bowery Presents range from 600 people to 20,000 people.

== History ==
The business evolution of The Bowery Presents:

- 1993 – The Mercury Lounge (250 capacity club), focusing on upcoming artists
- 1997 – Bowery Ballroom (600 capacity club or small mid-size venue), headliner-oriented
- 2003 – Webster Hall (1400 capacity mid-size club), headliner-oriented
- 2006 – Live Nation's New York president Jim Glancy jumps over to become partner and contributes to the company's expansion by doing shows in larger venues with his long-term Live Nation artists and indie rock stars in venues such as Radio City Music Hall and Madison Square Garden
- 2007 – Music Hall of Williamsburg, another mid-size club that broadens the company's portfolio of venues creating an "internal" orbit in which they can promote artists at different career-levels and in different neighborhoods.
- 2007 – Terminal 5 (3000 capacity mid-size venue) in Midtown Manhattan
- 2008 – Wellmont Theatre (2000 capacity mid-sized theatre) in Montclair, NJ
- 2010 – Expansion into Boston
- 2013 – Wellmont Theatre leaves
- 2014 – Webster Hall leaves
- 2016 – AEG Live acquire a stake in The Bowery Presents
- 2017 – Brooklyn Steel opens, Bowery Ballroom and Mercury Lounge leave
- 2019 – Webster Hall returns, in operational partnership with BSE Global and AEG Live
- 2023 – Racket (formerly Highline Ballroom) opens, adding another 650 capacity venue to the portfolio

== Description ==
The Bowery Presents was founded in 2004 by John Moore, Michael Swier, Michael Winsch, and Brian Swier. In 2006, The Bowery Presents partnered with former LiveNation CEO Jim Glancy, and began to expand to larger venues in New York such as Radio City Music Hall, Beacon Theatre, Central Park SummerStage, and Madison Square Garden.

From 2008, The Bowery Presents began expanding to other regions including New Jersey, Maine, Boston, Philadelphia. In 2016 it was reported that AEG Live had acquired a stake in The Bowery Presents, and in 2017, the company ended its relationship with Michael Swier, Brian Swier, Michael Winsch, and their venues, the Bowery Ballroom and Mercury Lounge. The Bowery Presents is currently operated by Jim Glancy and cofounder John Moore.

== Locations ==
Venue name	Address	Opened	Capacity
Asbury Lanes	209 4th Avenue, Asbury Park, NJ 07712	1962	700
Brooklyn Steel	319 Frost Street, New York City, NY 11222	2017	1,800
Fête Music Hall	103 Dike Street, Providence, RI 02909	2016	730
Forest Hills Stadium	1 Tennis Place, New York City, NY 11375	1923	14,000
Franklin Music Hall	421 N. 7th Street, Philadelphia, PA 19123	1968	2,700
Keswick Theatre	291 N Keswick Ave, Glenside, PA 19038	1928	1,300
Music Hall of Williamsburg	66 North 6th Street, New York City, NY 11211	2001	650
Ovation Hall	500 Boardwalk, Atlantic City, NJ 08401	2012	5,000
Roadrunner	89 Guest St, Boston, MA 02135	2022	3,500
Racket NYC	431 W 16th St, New York, NY 10011	2023	650
Rams Head Live!	20 Market Pl, Baltimore, MD 21202	2004	1,500
Royale	279 Tremont St, Boston, MA 02116	2010	1,000
Starland Ballroom	570 Jernee Mill Road, Sayreville, NJ 08872	1962	2,500
State Theatre	609 Congress Street, Portland, ME 04101	1929	1,870
Terminal 5	610 West 56th Street, New York City, NY 10019	2003	3,000
National Theater	708 East Broad Street, Richmond, VA 23219	1923	1,500
Norva Theatre	317 Monticello Avenue, Norfolk, VA 23510	1922	1,450
The Sinclair	52 Church St., Cambridge, MA 02138	2013	525
Thompson's Point	1 Thompsons Point, Portland, ME 04102	2017	7,500
Underground Arts	1200 Callowhill Street, Philadelphia, PA 19108	2013	650
Union Transfer	1026 Spring Garden Street, Philadelphia, PA 19123	2011	1,200
Virginia Credit Union Live!	600 E Laburnum Avenue, Richmond, VA 23222	1991	6,000
Webster Hall	125 E. 11th Street, New York City, NY 10003	1886	1,500
Xcite Center	2999 Street Road, Bensalem, PA 19020	2018	3,750

== Venues ==
=== New York City ===
- Music Hall of Williamsburg - 650 capacity; Brooklyn, NY
- Racket NYC - 650 capacity; Manhattan, NY
- Webster Hall - 1,350 capacity; Manhattan, NY
- Brooklyn Steel - 1,800 capacity; Brooklyn, NY
- Terminal 5 - 2,800 capacity; Manhattan, NY
- Forest Hills Stadium - 13,000 capacity; Queens, NY

==== Bowery Boston ====
Bowery Presents moved to Boston, Massachusetts in April 2010 when the company signed a long-term deal with The Royale to be the sole presenter of live music at the nightclub/music venue. Bowery opened a small office in Boston to run the venue and to book events for larger spaces. Since 2010, Bowery has opened The Sinclair and hired the two promoters of TT the Bear's and Great Scott. The promoters work in conjunction with Bowery Presents to bring events to Great Scott and TT the Bear's, as well as The Royale and The Sinclair.

- The Royale is a 1,000 person capacity venue in downtown Boston. It was the company's first space outside of the New York region.
- The Sinclair is a live-music venue and restaurant launched in the winter of 2013 in Cambridge. The live music space accommodates 525 people with plans to host 200 shows annually, while the restaurant will seat 104 and will be open seven days a week. The Sinclair is the first restaurant that the company will work with.
- Great Scott is a venue in Allston, MA with a capacity of about 240 people.

Great Scott closed in 2020 during the pandemic, but has plans to reopen in 2026.

=== Other notable venues ===
- Union Transfer, opened originally in 1889 as the Spring Garden Farmer's Market, is a live music and entertainment venue in Philadelphia, Pennsylvania. After going through several changes over the years, the venue was renovated through a joint venture between R5 Productions, Four Corners Management, and The Bowery Presents in 2011. At capacity, it holds up to about 1100 for standing room.
- Franklin Music Hall, formerly known as Electric Factory, in Philadelphia.
- State Theatre is a historic live music venue in downtown Portland, Maine. Opened in the winter of 1929, the theatre has been host to several acts. It reopened in 2010 after an agreement to renovate the property between Alex Crothers from Higher Ground in Burlington, Vermont and The Bowery Presents. At capacity, it holds between 1,450 and 1,610 patrons.
