= Blkswn =

blkswn

Studio album by Smino
- Released: March 14, 2017
- Recorded: 2014–16
- Studio: Classick Studios
- Genres: Hip hop; R&B; neo soul; jazz-funk; electro bounce
- Length: 63:14
- Labels: Zero Fatigue; Downtown
- Producers: Monte Booker; THEMpeople; Sango; Phoelix; J. Bird

Smino chronology
blkjuptr (2015)	blkswn (2017)	NØIR (2018)

Singles from blkswn
- 1. "blkswn" Released: December 2, 2016; 2. "Anita" Released: February 8, 2017; 3. "Netflix & Dusse" Released: July 26, 2017; 4. "Wild Irish Roses" Released: March 26, 2018

blkswn (pronounced "black swan") is the debut studio album by American rapper Smino. It was released on March 14, 2017 with Zero Fatigue under license to Downtown Records.

The album includes guest appearances from Ravyn Lenae, Bari, theMIND, Jay2, Via Rosa, Drea Smith, Akenya, Jean Deaux, and Noname, with production from Monte Booker, THEMpeople, Sango, Phoelix, and J. Bird. The album artwork was created by Victor Birriel and taken by Chicago native, Taylor Madison, photographer behind Diary of Disposables.

== Background ==
The release date holds a special significance to the St. Louis rapper because 314 is the area code of his hometown.

== Release and promotion ==
=== Singles ===
On December 2, 2016, Smino announced the title of the album and released "blkswn" as the first single. On February 8, 2017, the second single, "Anita" was released. He released "Blkoscars" on February 24, and "Father Son, Holy Smoke" on March 10 as promotional singles. On July 26, the music video for "Netflix & Dusse" was released. On March 26, 2018, Smino released the album's final single and music video for "Wild Irish Roses".

=== Tours ===
Following the album's release, Smino headlined in his month-long Swanita Tour, which included 22 dates with guests Monte Booker, Jay2, Bari, and Jean Deaux. Smino and Ravyn Lenae also opened for SZA on the CTRL Tour. During October, he was opening act for T-Pain on his Acoustic Tour, who later appeared on the remix for "Anita" on October 27.

== Critical reception ==
Professional ratings
Review scores
Source	Rating
Ear Milk	4/5 stars
Exclaim	7/10 stars

Upon its release, album received critical acclaim and positive reviews. Kelsee Thomas of Earmilk said "Smino is letting us know in blkswn that he's aware of the change and of the fact that he needs to pay attention to keeping his vices under control now more than ever. He asked for this blessing and now he's asking for help while his blessings." Scott Glaysher of Exclaim said "Any time an artist can blend genres together in a way that doesn't seem forced or stolen, it definitely makes for an eye-opening listen." On March 17, 2017, Apple Music named Smino "New Artist of the Week".

=== Accolades ===
Publication	Rank	Ref.
BET	6	
Complex	41	
Consequence of Sound	18	
Rolling Stone	18	

== Track listing ==
No.	Title	Writer(s)	Producer(s)	Length
1.	"Wild Irish Roses"	Christopher Smith Jr.; Ahmanti Booker	Monte Booker	2:49
2.	"Maraca"	Smith Jr.; Booker	Monte Booker	3:25
3.	"Glass Flows" (featuring Ravyn Lenae)	Smith Jr.; Ravyn Lenae; Booker	Monte Booker	3:08
4.	"Flea Flicka" (featuring Bari)	Smith Jr.; Jabari Allen; Booker	Monte Booker	2:43
5.	"Spit Shine"	Smith Jr.; Booker	Monte Booker	2:10
6.	"Netflix & Dusse"	Smith Jr.; Booker	Monte Booker	4:19
7.	"Anita"	Smith Jr.; Booker	Monte Booker	3:56
8.	"Lobby Kall"	Smith Jr.; Booker	Monte Booker	2:44
9.	"Edgar Allen Poe'd Up" (featuring theMIND)	Smith Jr.; Zarif Wilder; Booker	Monte Booker	3:10
10.	"Father Son, Holy Smoke"	Smith Jr.; Lon Renzell Rudolph Jr.	THEMpeople	4:00
11.	"B Role"	Smith Jr.; Booker	Monte Booker	3:01
12.	"Blkoscars" (featuring Jay2)	Smith Jr.; Jeffrey Smith; Booker	Monte Booker	3:40
13.	"blkswn"	Smith Jr.; Kai Wright	Sango	2:52
14.	"Long Run" (featuring Via Rosa)	Smith Jr.; Booker; Michael Neil; Lluvia Rosa Vela	Monte Booker; Phoelix	4:51
15.	"Innamission"	Smith Jr.; Booker	Monte Booker	2:15
16.	"Silk Pillows" (featuring Akenya)	Smith Jr.; Lon Renzell Rudolph Jr.; Akenya Seymour; Booker	Monte Booker; THEMpeople	3:27
17.	"Ricky Millions" (featuring Drea Smith)	Smith Jr.; Booker; Joe Cowell; Carlton Mahone; Drea Smith; Rodney Terry	Monte Booker; J. Bird	2:54
18.	"Amphetamine" (featuring Bari, Jean Deaux & Noname)	Smith Jr.; Allen; Booker; Zoi Harris; Michael Neil; Jaylon Roberts; Fatimah Warner	Monte Booker; Phoelix; J.Robb	7:49
Total length:				63:14

Notes

- "Amphetamine" contains a hidden track titled "Krash Kourse" featuring Bari, Jean Deaux, and Noname, produced by Monte Booker, Phoelix and J.Robb

== Personnel ==
- Smino – vocals
- Monte Booker – production
- Ravyn Lenae – vocals
- Bari – vocals
- theMIND – vocals
- Jay2 – vocals
- Via Rosa – vocals
- Drea Smith – vocals
- Akenya – vocals
- THEMpeople – production
- Sango – production
- Phoelix – production
- J. Bird – production
- J.Robb – production
- Noname – additional vocals
- Jean Deaux – additional vocals
- Julian Bell – additional background vocals, instrumentation
- Michael E. Neil – additional background vocals, instrumentation
- Erik Hunter – additional background vocals, instrumentation
- Victor Birriel – artwork
- Taylor Madison – artwork
- Elton "L10MixedIt" Chueng – engineering, mixing, mastering
