= General Electric Switchgear Plant =

Historic factory building in Philadelphia, Pennsylvania

- U.S. National Register of Historic Places
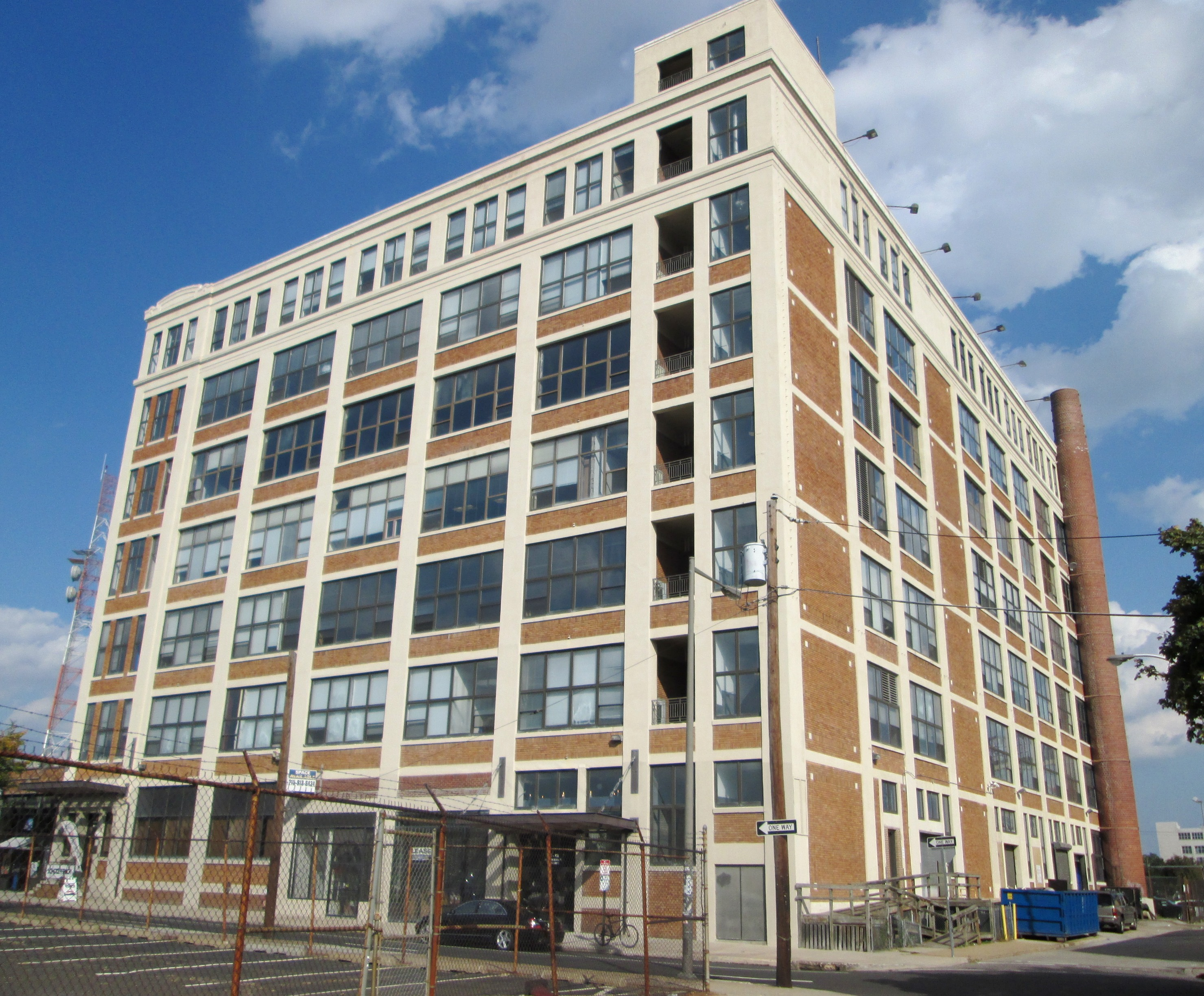
- Building in 2013

- Location within Philadelphia Location within Pennsylvania Location within the United States
- Location: 421 N. 7th St. at Willow St. Philadelphia, Pennsylvania
- Coordinates: 39°57′31″N 75°9′1″W
- Area: 0.8 acres (0.32 ha)
- Built: 1916
- Architect: William Steele & Co.
- NRHP reference No.: 85003470
- Added to NRHP: October 31, 1985

The General Electric Switchgear Plant is a historic factory building located at 421 North 7th Street at Willow Street in the Callowhill neighborhood of Philadelphia, Pennsylvania. It was built in 1916, and is a seven-story, seven bay by nine bay, reinforced concrete building with brick facing. It was designed by William Steele & Company for General Electric, which manufactured electric switchboard equipment there.

The building was added to the National Register of Historic Places in 1985. A music venue, Franklin Music Hall, occupies part of the building.

== See also ==
- National Register of Historic Places listings in North Philadelphia
