= Luv 4 Rent =

Studio album by Smino
- Released: October 28, 2022
- Recorded: 2021–2022
- Length: 50:59
- Labels: Zero Fatigue; Motown
- Producers: Adam Sylvester; AJ Thomas; Amarahbeats; Beat Butcha; Charlie Myles; Chi Chi; Childish Major; Cory Henry; Daoud; DJ Dahi; Groove; Kal Banx; Monte Booker; Nami; Phoelix; Smino; Sucuki

Smino chronology
She Already Decided (2020)	Luv 4 Rent (2022)	Maybe in Nirvana (2024)

Singles from Luv 4 Rent
- 1. "90 Proof" Released: September 30, 2022; 2. "Matinee" Released: October 21, 2022

Luv 4 Rent is the third studio album by American rapper Smino. It was released on October 28, 2022, through Zero Fatigue under license to Motown. The album includes guest appearances from J. Cole, Doechii, Fatman Scoop, Cruza, Lucky Daye, Phoelix, Cory Henry, Ravyn Lenae, Lil Uzi Vert and Reggie.

== Background ==
On November 16, 2021, Smino announced that he had signed a new record deal with Motown in partnership with his independent label, Zero Fatigue. In an article with Billboard, he spoke about the inspiration for the album, saying, "album No. 3 on the way, it's all about love and how you can use/lose your heart in the process."

== Recording and production ==
The album contains production from Monte Booker, Phoelix, Groove, Kal Banx, Childish Major, and Cory Henry, among others. His first two studio albums were primarily handled by Booker and didn't contain samples, however this album makes use of samples including "Knock Knock" by Monica on "No L's". The song "90 Proof" was originally planned to be on J. Cole's album The Fall Off, but Smino later asked for the song back. He explained, "I thought about it and the whole time I knew it would be great for me, being on J. Cole’s album. When I was wrapping up the tracklist, though, I just felt like something was missing, and I put "90 Proof" right after my intro and it just sounded like they were meant for each other. So I just called Cole and asked him if I could get the song back and he let me." The first version of the song "Pro Freak" used the sample from J. Cole's "January 28th", but the owners didn't clear the sample. Later, DJ Dahi and Childish Major remade the final beat.

Childish Major also produced "Pudgy". Smino explained how Lil Uzi Vert got on the song saying they were in the studio with Saba and No I.D., and went outside to smoke. Lil Uzi Vert was in the next room and had just posted their song "I Deserve," so he and Smino already had a relationship. "I told him I had this song where I say his name in the hook, and he really wanted to hear it. I start playing it, and he starts turning up to it. I left the studio because I had a dinner to go to and I gave him the file. The restaurant was about 30 minutes away, and as I’m getting out of the car after leaving the studio and getting to dinner, Uzi calls me and plays his verse for me. I didn’t even make it to my meal before he sent me that verse." The album's outro "Lee & Lovie" was produced by Groove when he was in L.A. and saw a video playing that sample on a Sunday morning, which inspired him to inspired him to make the beat and sent it to Smino.

Smino revealed in an interview that he was working on two versions of this album between 2020 and 2021. "I started working on pt. 1 of Luv 4 Rent the day I got off the bus from the Hoopti tour. That day, I made a song called "Luv 4 Rent" that's still coming out, but that was on pt. 1. But on this version that's coming out right now, we started working on this probably in 2021." He continued to say, "Pt. 1 is like a B-side, but I didn’t like it as much because it’s more like a movie. It’s mad cinematic, so instead of the deluxe, I’m going to drop pt. 1 like the prequel. It’s going to explain what happened that led me up to this."

== Artwork and title ==
The album's artwork contains Smino and his friends outside doing their hair in front of a mirror. He explained the inspiration of this cover saying "There were a few things that inspired this cover art. First, I always get my hair done on my [album] covers. I wanted to show that I’m doing my own [hair] on this cover because it’s supposed to represent self-care and self-love. I always had someone else taking care of my shit, or may have been putting my crown in the hands of other motherfuckers. But I can take care of my own crown too." He also explained the theme of this album saying, "Self-love is definitely a big theme on this album, and I also think another way to interpret it is I was leading other people to self-love, too. One big thing I like about my fans is they always tell me that I make them want to be themselves. That’s the best type of inspiration I think I can leave. I want to make niggas want to look inward instead of outward to other shit."

== Singles and promotion ==
In 2020, Smino announced his third studio album was planned to be released after the mixtape She Already Decided, however was faced multiple delays. He released a number of singles that ended up not making the album in 2021 including the song "MLK Dr", which teased the album title in the music video. On May 18, he released the single "Rice & Gravy" with Monte Booker. On November 11, Smino released the single "I Deserve" featuring NOS. On December 7, 2021, he announced the title of his third studio album, Luv 4 Rent, while performing "I Deserve" and an unreleased song called "Black Luv Ain't Dead" on the YouTube Original series What Say What?!.

On September 30, 2022, he released the first official single from the album, "90 Proof" with J. Cole. On October 10, he announced the album's release date in a trailer narrated by Bootsy Collins. On October 21, he released the second single, "Matinee", while also revealing the album's tracklist.

=== Tours ===
On October 11, Smino announced that he will be co-headlining a tour with JID in support of the album. The "Luv Is 4ever" Tour includes 39 dates and is scheduled to take place between January and March 2023.

== Critical reception ==
Professional ratings
Review scores
Source	Rating
AllMusic	4/5 stars
HipHopDX	4/5 stars
Pitchfork	7.7/10

Luv 4 Rent received generally positive reviews from critics. TiVo Staff for AllMusic notes that "Smino continues his blend of several generations of rap styles, R&B, neo-soul, and even hints of psychedelically bent pop, delivering some of the strongest articulations of his sound to date." He continued to state that Luv 4 Rent "draws heavily on a Kendrick Lamar influence for its vocal performances and melodic structuring," noting that the "album experiments with combining electronic production elements." Concluding his review, he stated that the "lyrical themes of love, intimacy, and fraught relationships carry the majority of" the album. HipHopDX's Lauren Floyd notes that "Smino often uses his own voice as an instrument, moving through different octaves seamlessly." She continued to write that Luv 4 Rent is a "repeat offender in wooing many hearts with its delicate production and its highs and lows," concluding her review by noting that the album "can't whole-heartedly be labeled as a no skip album," however, "every song does its part, building on top of the next to create a distinct memorable experience listen after listen."

Heven Haile for Pitchfork noted that "Luv 4 Rent is a meditation on the mind maze of romantic, platonic, self, and familial intimacy." Haile wrote that "across two studio albums, Smino has mastered sultry falsettos, funkafied productions, and clever wordplay." Continuing her review, Haile stated that "moments of vulnerability are almost swept under his rapid-fire punchlines" and "there’s a tension of wanting a woman to hold him down." Concluding her review, she noted that "Luv 4 Rent is a collection of sobering realizations amid porch-top ciphers, humid Midwestern summer block parties, Sunday after-service family gatherings, and late-night Backwoods-sponsored hookups," and that the project is "lively, raw, and a bit hectic."

== Track listing ==
Luv 4 Rent track listing
No.	Title	Writer(s)	Producer(s)	Length
1.	"4rm Da Source"	Christopher Smith Jr.; Ahmanti Booker	Monte Booker	1:42
2.	"No L's"	Smith Jr.; Kalon Berry; Craig Xavier Brockman; Lee Hatim; Melissa Elliott; Michael Neil	Kal Banx	2:55
3.	"90 Proof" (with J. Cole)	Smith Jr.; Jermaine Cole; Nathan Foley; Bola Johnson; Booker; Benjamin Tolbert	Groove; Monte Booker	3:28
4.	"Pro Freak" (with Doechii & Fatman Scoop)	Smith Jr.; Jaylah Ji'mya Hickmon; Isaac Freeman III; Booker; Neil; Dacoury Natche; Jeffrey Thompson; Markus Randle; Dylan Ismael Teixeira; Traci Young-Byron	Monte Booker; Childish Major; Phoelix; DJ Dahi; Nami	4:29
5.	"Ole Ass Kendrick"	Smith Jr.; Booker; Israel Leon	Monte Booker; VZN	2:24
6.	"Louphoria" (with Cruza)	Smith Jr.; Booker; Ainsworth Ashton Thomas	Monte Booker; Adam Sylvester; AJ Thomas; AmarahBeats	3:46
7.	"Blu Billy"	Smith Jr.; Booker; Amari Lewis; Neil; Foley	Monte Booker	2:42
8.	"Matinee" (with Kal Banx)	Smith Jr.; Charles B. Wimberly; Berry	Kal Banx	3:08
9.	"Modennaminute" (with Lucky Daye & Phoelix)	Smith Jr.; Booker; David Brown; Neil; Dustin Bowle	Monte Booker; Phoelix	4:47
10.	"Defibrillator"	Smith Jr.; Tolbert; Brandon Casey; Brian Casey; Bryan Cox; Neil; Foley	Groove	3:33
11.	"Garden Lady"	Smith Jr.; Booker; Neil; Ravyn Lenae Washington; Tim Friedrich	Smino; Sucuki; Monte Booker; Phoelix	3:31
12.	"Settle Down" (featuring Cory Henry & Ravyn Lenae)	Smith Jr.; Cory Henry; Washington; Booker; Neil; Charlie Myles	Monte Booker; Charlie Myles	3:03
13.	"Pudgy" (featuring Lil Uzi Vert)	Smith Jr.; Symere Woods; Booker; Chidi Osondu; Daoud Anthony; Eliot Peter Phillip Dubock; Randle	Chi Chi; Childish Major; Daoud; Beat Butcha	2:16
14.	"Curtains"	Smith Jr.; Booker; Henry; Neil	Cory Henry; Monte Booker	6:24
15.	"Lee & Lovie" (featuring Reggie)	Smith Jr.; Reginald Helms Jr; Benjamin Tolbert; Henry; Emma Jean Thomas; Jacqueline Members; Neil; Foley; Robert Eugene Poindexter; Stanley Poindexter	Groove; Cory Henry	2:52
Total length:				50:59

== Personnel ==
Credits adapted from Tidal.

Musicians

- Smino – vocals (all tracks)
- J. Cole – vocals (3)
- Phoelix – drums (4)
- Karlea Lynné – additional vocals (4)
- Monte Booker – additional vocals (7)
- Cruza – additional vocals (10)
- Lucky Daye – additional vocals (10)
- Phoelix – additional keyboards (10)
- Ravyn Lenae – additional vocals (10, 11)
- Smino – drums (10)
- Phoelix – bass (2, 10, 15)
- Phoelix – piano (14, 15)
- Phoelix – additional vocals (6, 10, 12, 15)
- Eryn Allen Kane – additional vocals (15)
- Cory Henry – organ (12, 15)
- Nathan Foley – guitar (3, 7, 15)

Technical

- Kuldeep Chudasama – record engineer (3)
- Jayda Love – record engineer (4)
- Jeff "JeffOnTheBoards" Thompson – record engineer (3-5)
- Phoelix – record engineer (9)
- Monte Booker – record engineer (1, 6, 10)
- Bryan Schwaller – engineer (1), record engineer (6, 7, 10, 12)
- Smino – record engineer (2-6, 8-14)
- Don "Hulio" Outten – record engineer (2, 13, 15)
- Arnulfo “Arnie” Reyes III – mix assistant (15)
- Robert Mendioro – mix engineer (2, 4, 13), master assistant (all tracks), mix assistant (1, 3, 5-12, 14, 15)
- Daniel Vargas – master assistant (all tracks), mix assistant (all tracks)
- Elton “L10MixedIt” Chueng – mix engineer (all tracks), master engineer (all tracks), record engineer (2)

== Charts ==
Chart performance for Luv 4 Rent
Chart (2022)	Peak position
US Billboard 200	50
US Top R&B/Hip-Hop Albums (Billboard)	28
