= Procrastination (Broke) =

Single by J. Cole
- Language: English
- Released: January 18, 2023
- Genre: Hip hop
- Length: 2:59
- Songwriter: J. Cole
- Producer: Bvtman

J. Cole singles chronology
"90 Proof" (2022)	"Procrastination (Broke)" (2023)	"On the Street" (2023)

"Procrastination (Broke)" is a song by American rapper J. Cole. The song was released on YouTube by music producer Bvtman as a surprise song on January 18, 2023. The cover art for the song features a text message from Cole expressing his appreciation for every producer "cooking up and sharing their work with the world" and the song was released by Cole as a "thank you" to Bvtman for helping him find a spark of inspiration.

== Background ==
Since as early as 2019, Cole had announced that a much anticipated album "The Fall-Off" could possibly be his last album before his retirement from rap. In the cover art for procrastination (broke), a text message can be seen which states:

"This song should live on your channel and serve as a thank you to you and every producer out there cooking up and sharing their work with the world. It’s a million artists out there right now just like me, hungry and searching every day for something to spark a word, a melody, a hook, a verse, a punchline, a way to vent, or a way to CUT THROUGH."

Cole also stated that he found the beat by typing in "J. Cole type beat" into YouTube. He mentioned that he decided to release the song for those that needed to hear it.

"On a day when I couldn't find much motivation, I was looking for anything to inspire me. Out of curiosity, I typed in "J. Cole type beat" into YouTube. Yours was the first I saw. I pressed play, focused, and wrote this. This is some shit that would normally stay in the vault, but I don't want to hold onto the music like that no more. This is for you and whoever else need to hear it. God bless you bro and keep doing what you do!"
