= Franklin Music Hall =

Concert venue in Philadelphia, PA, US

- Interactive map of Franklin Music Hall
- Former names: Electric Factory (1968-2018)
- Address: 421 N. 7th Street; Philadelphia, Pennsylvania
- Coordinates: 39°57′33.1″N 75°08′58.9″W
- Owner: The Bowery Presents
- Operator: The Bowery Presents
- Seating type: General admission
- Capacity: 2,500-3,000
- Type: Indoor theater

Construction
- Opened: 1968–1973 (first incarnation); 1995–present (second incarnation)

Website
- www.bowerypresents.com/greater-philly/shows/franklin-music-hall

Franklin Music Hall is a concert venue in Philadelphia, Pennsylvania. It is in a converted building once part of the General Electric Switchgear Plant and opened in 1995. It has a capacity between 2,500 and 3,000 people. It is owned and operated by The Bowery Presents.

The venue features a variety of musical acts in the rap, electronic, heavy metal, rock, grunge, and pop genres.

== History ==
In 1968, the "Electric Factory and Flea Market", a concert venue, opened in a converted tire warehouse on the northwest corner of 22nd and Arch Streets. It was owned by Sheldon Kaplan, Herbert Spivak, and his brothers Jerry Spivak and Allen Spivak. They soon hired Larry Magid to book all of the shows. Kaplan sold his stake in the company after the Atlantic City Pop Festival in 1969 and Magid became a partner. The venue hosted concerts, including performances of Pink Floyd, The Chambers Brothers, Jimi Hendrix, and The Who, until 1970 and was torn down in 1973 to be replaced by condominiums.

Coincident with the venue, Electric Factory Concerts began as a concert promoter, also owned by Larry Magid.

In 1995, Magid and Spivak reopened the Electric Factory in a converted building from the General Electric Switchgear Plant on 7th and Willow Street.

In 2016, it was named the 16th best venue in the United States by Consequence.

In September 2018, the Electric Factory was sold to The Bowery Presents; however, the trademarked name was owned by rival Live Nation and the buyer sought a new name. After a public naming contest that received over 5,000 submissions, in October 2018, the new name was announced as Franklin Music Hall.
