= Music Hall of Williamsburg =

Music venue in Brooklyn, New York

Coordinates: 40°43′09″N 73°57′42″W

- Exterior of the venue, fall 2026
- Interactive map of Music Hall of Williamsburg
- Former names: Northsix (2001-07)
- Address: 66 N 6th St; Brooklyn, NY 11249
- Location: Williamsburg, Brooklyn
- Owner: The Bowery Presents
- Seating type: Standing-room only
- Capacity: 650
- Type: Music venue
- Public transit: New York City Subway: at Bedford Avenue; NYCT Bus: B62

Construction
- Groundbreaking: 2000
- Opened: Spring 2001
- Renovated: 2007
- Architects: Brian Swier; Michael Costantin

Website
- Venue Website

Music Hall of Williamsburg (formerly Northsix) is a music venue located at 66 North 6th Street in the Williamsburg neighborhood of Brooklyn in New York City. The venue is operated by The Bowery Presents, a group stemming from Bowery Ballroom that was bought by AEG in 2017. The Music Hall of Williamsburg has a capacity of 650 people and has shows on most nights of the week.

The venue is planned to close at its current location in 2026.

== History ==
The venue opened in the spring of 2001 as Northsix, and was one of the first of a wave of music venues to open in Brooklyn. Prior to the opening of Northsix, Manhattan was the primary borough in New York City where indie rock, underground, cutting-edge or avant-garde rock concerts were held. Northsix maintained an eclectic booking schedule and hosted countless notable music/comedy performances.

Northsix was named Best New Rock Club in 2002 by The Village Voice, as well as Best Rock Club and Best Williamsburg Music Venue in 2002 by a New York Press reader's poll. In 2003, Northsix was the location that was filmed for the opening scene of the 2003 Richard Linklater film School of Rock.

Northsix hosted a three-night run of critically acclaimed Elliott Smith shows in June 2003; these were his last New York performances before his death later that year.

Northsix was shut down by the New York City Fire Department on March 15, 2003, over a controversial booking of the band Leftöver Crack. The fire department cited an expired permit as the reason for the vacate order, but it is widely believed among those in the New York music scene that the action was in retaliation for booking a band that had openly criticized the department. The venue was able to reopen after a month of negotiation with city officials.

After the previous tenant's rent increased, the venue was acquired by the New York-based concert promotion company Bowery Presents in the beginning of 2007. The venue was remodeled, renovated and renamed Music Hall of Williamsburg.

Beginning in the 2010s, Music Hall of Williamsburg hosted several intimate concerts by artists who typically only play in arenas and stadiums. These included Kendrick Lamar in 2016, Harry Styles in 2020, Deftones in 2023 and Coldplay in 2024.

On December 17, 2025, it was announced that Music Hall of Williamsburg will close at its current location at the end of 2026, because the owners of the building elected not to renew the venue's lease.

On November 17, 2026, LCD Soundsystem played a surprise one-off show at the venue. TV on the Radio will play the final two concerts at the venue, on December 5 and 6.

== See also ==
- List of music venues
