= Smino =

American rapper (born 1991)

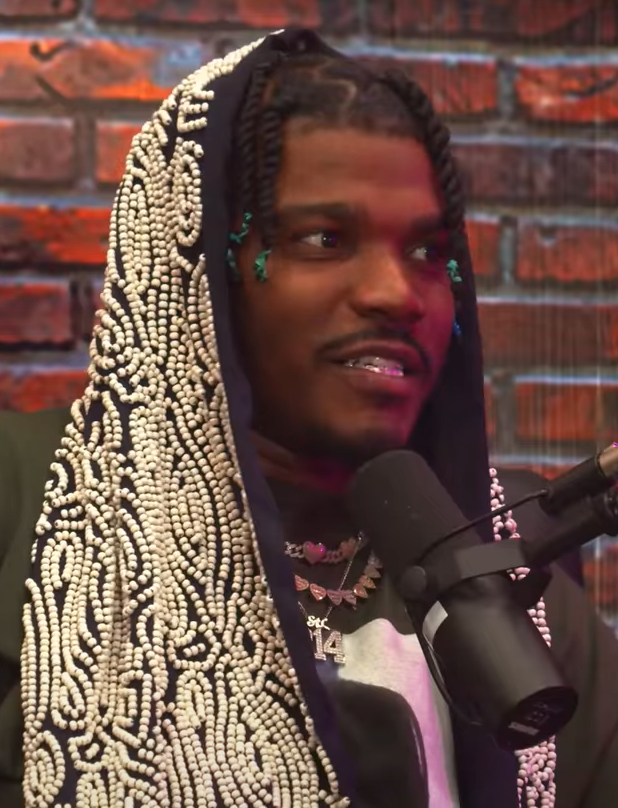
- Smino in 2024

Background information
- Also known as: C. Smi; Smeezy
- Born: Christopher Bjorn Smith Jr. October 2, 1991 (age 34); St. Louis, Missouri, U.S.
- Education: Columbia College Chicago
- Genres: Midwestern hip-hop; neo soul; funk; soul
- Occupations: Rapper; singer; songwriter; record producer
- Years active: 2009–present
- Labels: Zero Fatigue; Motown; EQT
- Member of: Zero Fatigue; Zoink Gang; Ghetto Sage
- Website: smitransfer.com

Christopher Smith Jr. (born October 2, 1991), better known by his stage name Smino, is an American rapper and singer. He is the founder of the musical collective Zero Fatigue with Bari, Monte Booker, Jay2, and Ravyn Lenae. He is one third of the supergroup Ghetto Sage, with Saba and Noname. Smino is signed to Downtown Records and Interscope.

Smino initially gained local recognition in 2012 where he released a mixtape called Smeezy Dot Com, and a collaboration mixtape with Bari called Retail. In 2015, he released two EPs: S!Ck S!Ck S!Ck and blkjuptr. His debut studio album blkswn was released to critical acclaim on March 14, 2017. His second studio album, NØIR, was released on November 8, 2018. His third studio album, Luv 4 Rent, was released on October 28, 2022. His fourth studio album, Maybe in Nirvana, was released on December 6, 2024.

== Early life and education ==
Christopher Bjorn Smith Jr. was born on October 2, 1991, in St. Louis, Missouri, into a musical family; his father played keys, his mother sang, and his grandfather played bass guitar for Blues Hall of Fame musician Muddy Waters. Both his father and grandfather were given opportunities to take their music far, but they gave up their success to be with their families. When he was seven, his father gave him a set of drums, which he played in his church's band, and also began singing. Smino graduated from Hazelwood Central High School, a suburban high school located in Florissant, Missouri, in 2010. He later moved to Chicago, Illinois, for college under the wing of his older cousin, singer Drea Smith.

== Musical career ==
=== 2009–2015: Career beginnings and various projects ===
Between 2009 and 2013, Smino went by the stage name C. Smi, and was in a rap duo with his friend Bari Allen called "Young Dumb and Outta Control" (YDOC), where they released three mixtapes including Retail. As they started to gain popularity locally, Smino released his first solo mixtape, Smeezy Dot Com in 2012 and moved back to Chicago. At Columbia College Chicago, he met engineer Chris "Classick" Inumerable, who became his manager.

On October 2, 2015, Smino released his first EP, S!Ck S!Ck S!Ck. On December 11, 2015, he released his second EP titled Blkjuptr.

=== 2016–2017: blkswn ===
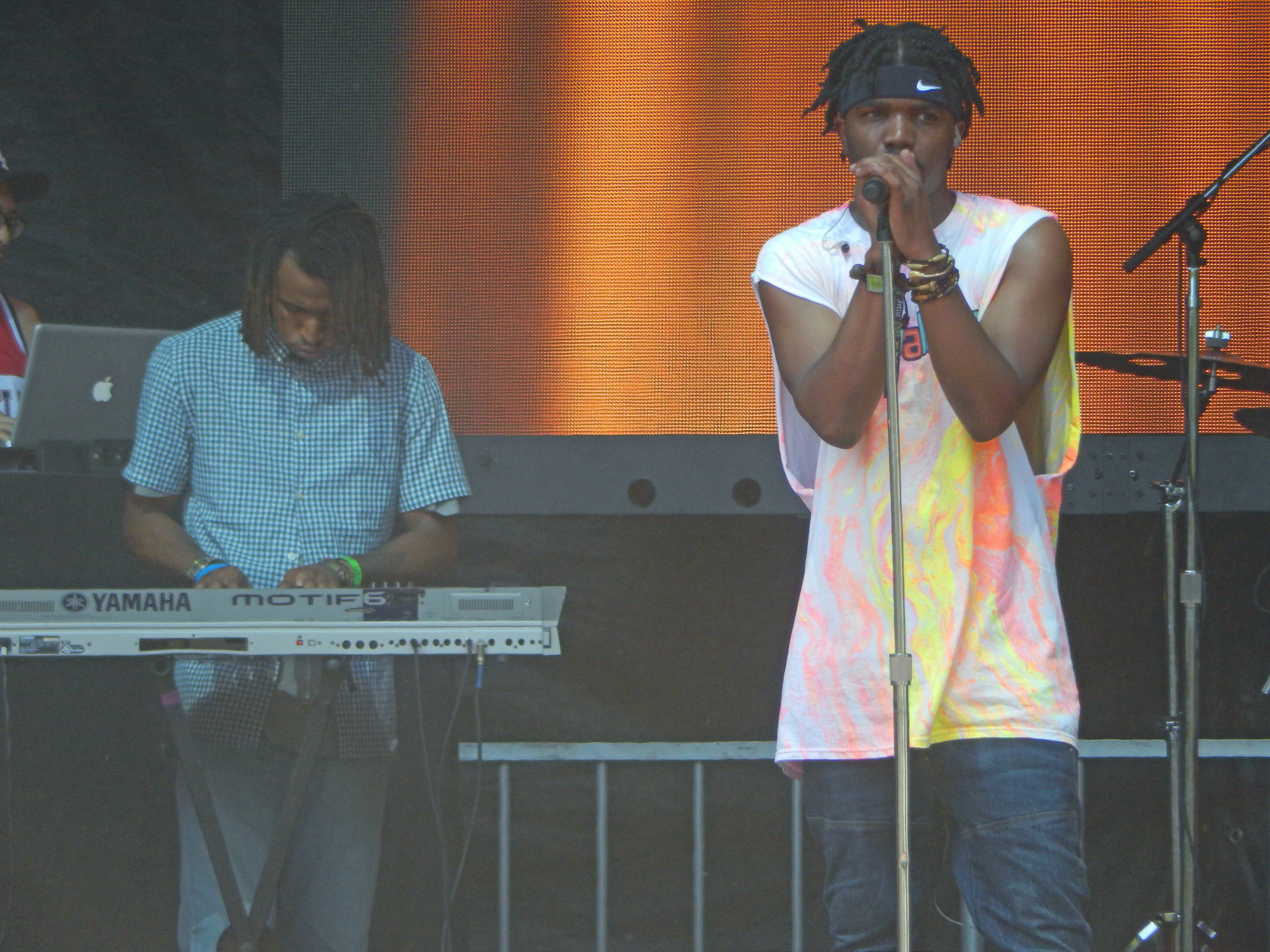
Smino at Lollapalooza in 2016

On July 31, 2016, Smino appeared on Noname's mixtape, Telefone, with Saba and Phoelix on the track "Shadow Man". In the fall of 2016, Smino was alongside Mick Jenkins on the A Quest For Love Tour. On October 27, he made another guest appearance on Bucket List Project on the song "World in My Hands".

On December 2, 2016, Smino released the title track to serve as the first single from his debut album, blkswn, which was released on March 14, 2017. The release date holds a special significance to Smino because 314 is the area code of his hometown. The album includes guest appearances from Ravyn Lenae, Bari, Noname, theMIND, Jay2, Via Rosa, Drea Smith, and Akenya, with production coming from Monte Booker, THEMpeople, Sango, Phoelix, and J. Bird.

Following the album's release, he headlined in his month-long Swanita Tour, which included 22 dates with guests Monte Booker, Jay2, Bari, and Jean Deaux. On July 6, it was announced that Smino and Ravyn Lenae will be opening for SZA on The CTRL Tour. He later released music videos for "Anita", "Netflix & Dusse", and "Wild Irish Roses". During October, he was opening act for T-Pain on his Acoustic Tour, who appeared on the remix for "Anita".

=== 2018–2019: NØIR ===
In April 2018, he and Monte Booker co-headlined the Kouple Drillz Tour which included shows in Asia and Australia. On May 17, he released a single called "New Coupe, Who Dis?" featuring Mick Jenkins. He also appeared on some of his frequent collaborative producers tracks, Cam O'Bi on "TenderHeaded", Phoelix on "Taranphoeno", and Sango on "Khlorine". On July 9, he released a remix to Drake's "In My Feelings", and a track called "Coupe Se' Yern" produced by himself.

On October 26, 2018, Smino released a single titled "L.M.F." produced by Sango, accompanied by a music video. Smino released the album's second single titled "Klink" on November 4, announcing it via an Instagram post. His second album, NØIR, was released on November 8. The album includes guest appearances from Zero Fatigue members, Bari, Jay2, and Ravyn Lenae, as well as Dreezy, and Valee. The production came from himself, Monte Booker, THEMpeople, Sango, Phoelix, KRS, Al B Smoov, and Da-P. In 2019, Smino announced the Hoopti Tour, which included 33 shows in England, the United States, and Canada. Supporting acts for the tour will be EarthGang and Phoelix. On April 3, 2019, Smino released the music video for "Z4L", directed by Ev Solomon and produced by AJR Films, with clips of backstage footage on tour.

Following the success of NØIR, Smino was invited to participate in the recording sessions for Revenge of the Dreamers III, a collaborative album released by Dreamville Records in July 2019. On the original release of the album, he was featured on "1993", "Sacrifices", and "Oh Wow...Swerve" as a member of Zoink Gang. When the album's Director's Cut edition was released, Smino was featured on two additional tracks: "Spin Move" and "Passcode". In August 2019, Smino appeared with Saba, Earthgang, and J. Cole in the music video for "Sacrifices", which has amassed almost 20 million views as of March 2021.

=== 2019–2020: She Already Decided and collaborations ===
On October 17, 2019, he announced the supergroup Ghetto Sage with Saba and Noname, releasing a single titled "Häagen Dazs". On October 25, he released the single "Trina", produced by Kenny Beats and Lido. On December 23, he released a two-song EP titled High 4 Da Highladays. Throughout the year, he collaborated with many artists such as Chance the Rapper, Cousin Stizz, SiR, and Doja Cat.

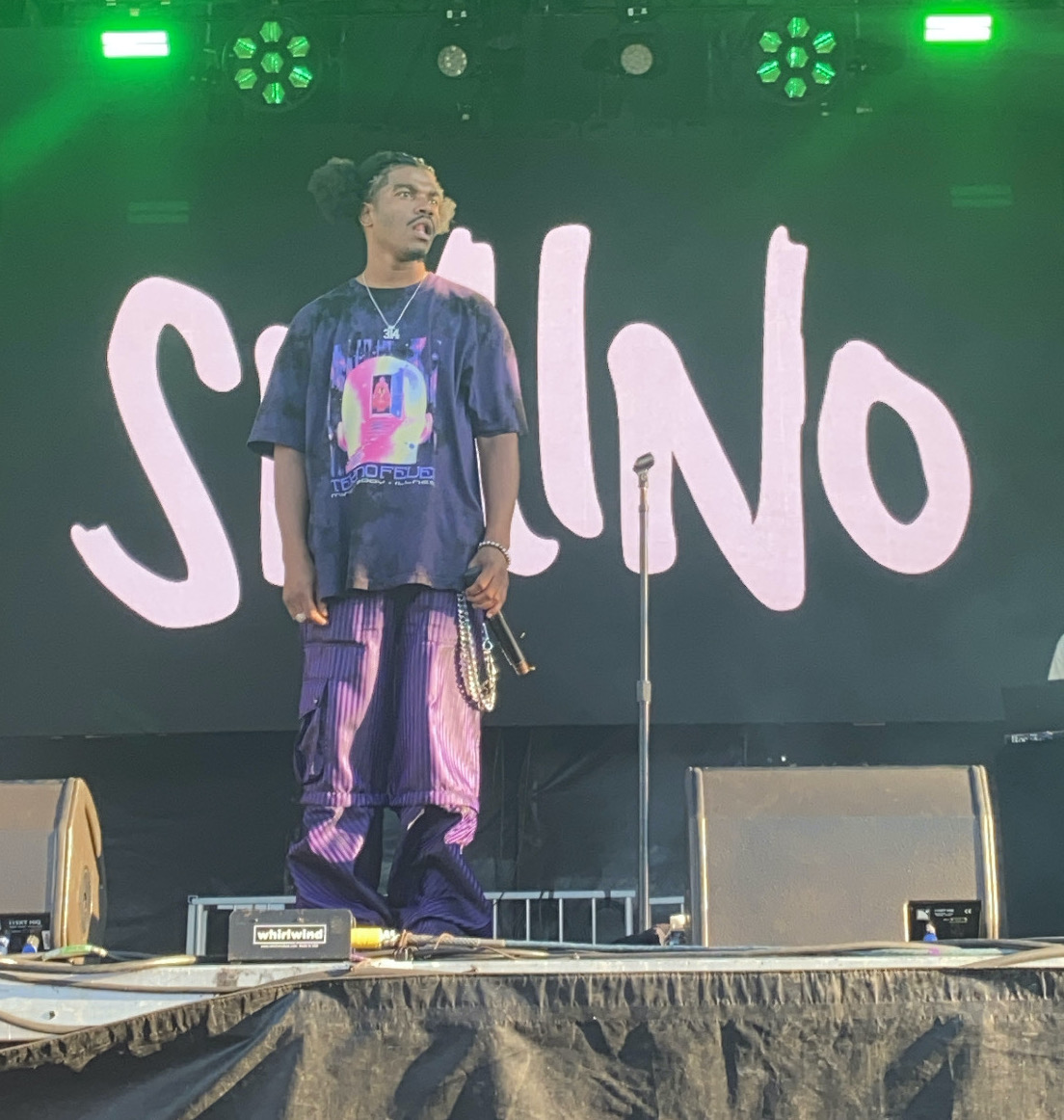
Smino performing at Governors Ball Music Festival in New York City in 2021

In February 2020, Smino announced the completion of his third studio album. On March 14, he released the song "Tempo" produced by VZN. On April 20, 2020, Smino released the mixtape She Already Decided, which includes guest appearances from Sevyn Streeter, T-Pain, Bari, and Rizz Capolatti. Production on the mixtape came from Groove, Kal Banx, VZN, and Phoelix among others. In August 2020, Smino was featured on the soundtrack to the Madden NFL 21 game, on the song "Backstage Pass", alongside Monte Booker and The Drums. Smino made further collaborations in 2020 appearing on songs with JID, Ari Lennox, and Thundercat.

=== 2021–2023: Luv 4 Rent ===
On January 18, 2021, Smino released the song "MLK Dr" in honor of Martin Luther King, Jr. Day. On May 18, Smino released the single "Rice & Gravy" with Monte Booker. The single was also performed on Colors Studio on May 24. He appeared on guest verses throughout 2021 including "Claymore" by Isaiah Rashad, "Right Track" by Syd and "Louie Bag" by Yebba. On November 11, Smino released the single "I Deserve" featuring NOS. On November 16, Smino announced he signed a new record deal with Motown in partnership with his independent label Zero Fatigue.

On December 7, 2021, Smino debuted a series with Issa Rae Productions on YouTube Originals titled What Say What?!. On the first episode, he announced the title of his third studio album, Luv 4 Rent, while performing "I Deserve" and an unreleased song called "Black Luv Ain't Dead".

On April 3, 2022, Smino was nominated for Best Engineered Album at the 64th Annual Grammy Awards.

On September 30, 2022, he released the first official single from the album, "90 Proof" with J. Cole. On October 21, he released the second single, "Matinee", while also revealing the album's tracklist. Luv 4 Rent was released on October 28, 2022. The album includes guest appearances from J. Cole, Doechii, Fatman Scoop, Cruza, Lucky Daye, Phoelix, Cory Henry, Ravyn Lenae, Lil Uzi Vert and Reggie.

=== 2024–present: Maybe in Nirvana ===
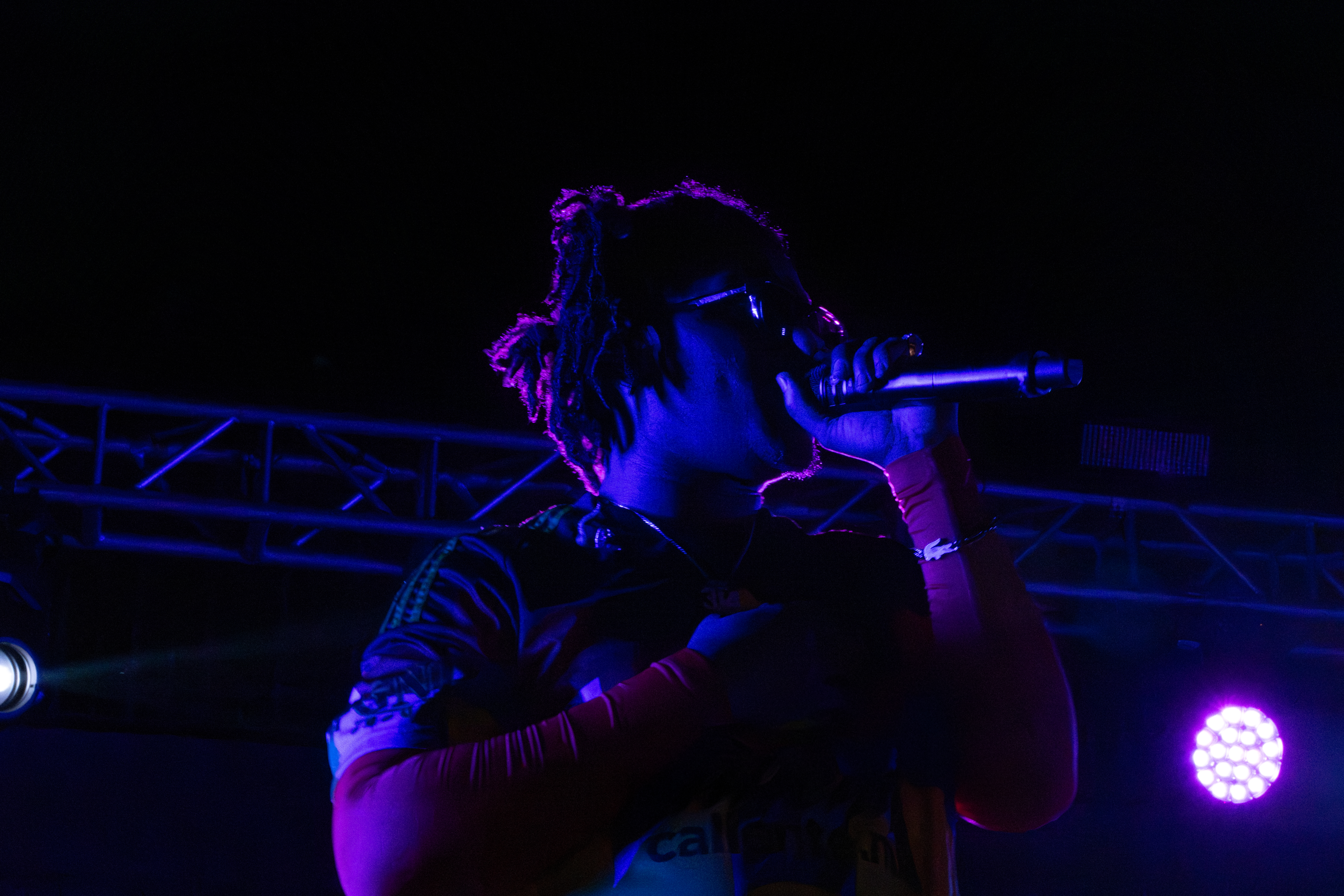
Smino performing in Santa Barbara in 2025

On December 6, 2024, Smino released his fourth studio album, Maybe in Nirvana, serving as his first independently released album. It consists of ten tracks written and recorded during the COVID-19 lockdowns. The album features guest appearances by Bun B, Ravyn Lenae, Thundercat, and Reggie. The album's lead single, "Dear Fren", was released the same day, with an accompanying music video.

== Personal life ==
In January 2021, Smino found out that he is related to Florida rapper Denzel Curry through the discovery of a shared uncle.

== Artistry ==
Smino describes his sound as futuristic funk and soulful rap and tends to call his style "ratchet romance". He grew up listening to a lot of jazz, gospel, and hip hop, including Busta Rhymes, Ludacris, Nelly, Bone Thugs-n-Harmony and Field Mob. Smino names rappers Kanye West, André 3000 and Lil Wayne as his biggest musical influences, as well as his cousin, Drea Smith. In an interview with Pitchfork he stated, "I grew up in the church, so it was a bunch of gospel along with Musiq Soulchild, Em, T-Pain—just a bunch of soulful dudes that are country. My first favorite rapper was Ludacris."

Scott Glaysher of Exclaim! described his music is a "mix of smart rapping and crowd-pleasing, futuristic R&B grooves." Jay Balfour from Pitchfork said he focuses "on his incredibly versatile voice within a warm palette of sludgy R&B and neo-funk" and "throws a million different voices into the mix." Rolling Stone said "his rap makes room for southern R&B and imperfect harmony singing; the drums are inevitably cooled out, like nth-wave neo soul."

== Other ventures ==
=== Zero Fatigue ===
Smino is a founder and part of a musical collective and record label called Zero Fatigue with Monte Booker, Jay2, Bari, Ravyn Lenae, Elton "L10MixedIt" Chueng, Chris "Classick" Innumerable, and Nosidam. The collective's origins began when Smino met Classick at Columbia College Chicago, who owned a recording studio in his house in Chicago and later became his manager. Interning for Classick, engineer and mixer L10MixedIt Chueng met Smino in that studio where they began working together. Unofficial members and affiliates of the collective include Jean Deaux, Drea Smith, Phoelix, & JayBaby TheGreaty.

=== Kribmas ===
Kribmas is an annual Christmas concert and fundraising event hosted by Smino in his hometown of St. Louis, Missouri, which began in 2016. Ymani Wince wrote about the event saying, "Kribmas is more than just Smino's homecoming weekend; the rapper's team employs local photographers, videographers, stylists, businesses and artists to put each element of the show together."

=== Fashion ===
On April 5, 2018, Smino unveiled his design of satin-lined hoodies called "Silk Pillows", named after his song of the same name. After it went viral on the internet, he explained the design addresses the problem of waking up with messy or damaged hair.

== Discography ==
=== Studio albums ===
- blkswn (2017)
- Noir (2018)
- Luv 4 Rent (2022)
- Maybe in Nirvana (2024)

== Filmography ==
List of Film and television shows, showing year aired, character played and notes
Year	Title	Role	Notes	Ref.
2018	Beats + Bites with the Potash Twins	Himself	Episode 4	
2021	What Say What?!	Himself	Episode 1; also creator	
2025	Mad Dawg	Mad Dawg	Episode 1	
