= Terminal 5 (venue) =

Music venue in Manhattan, New York

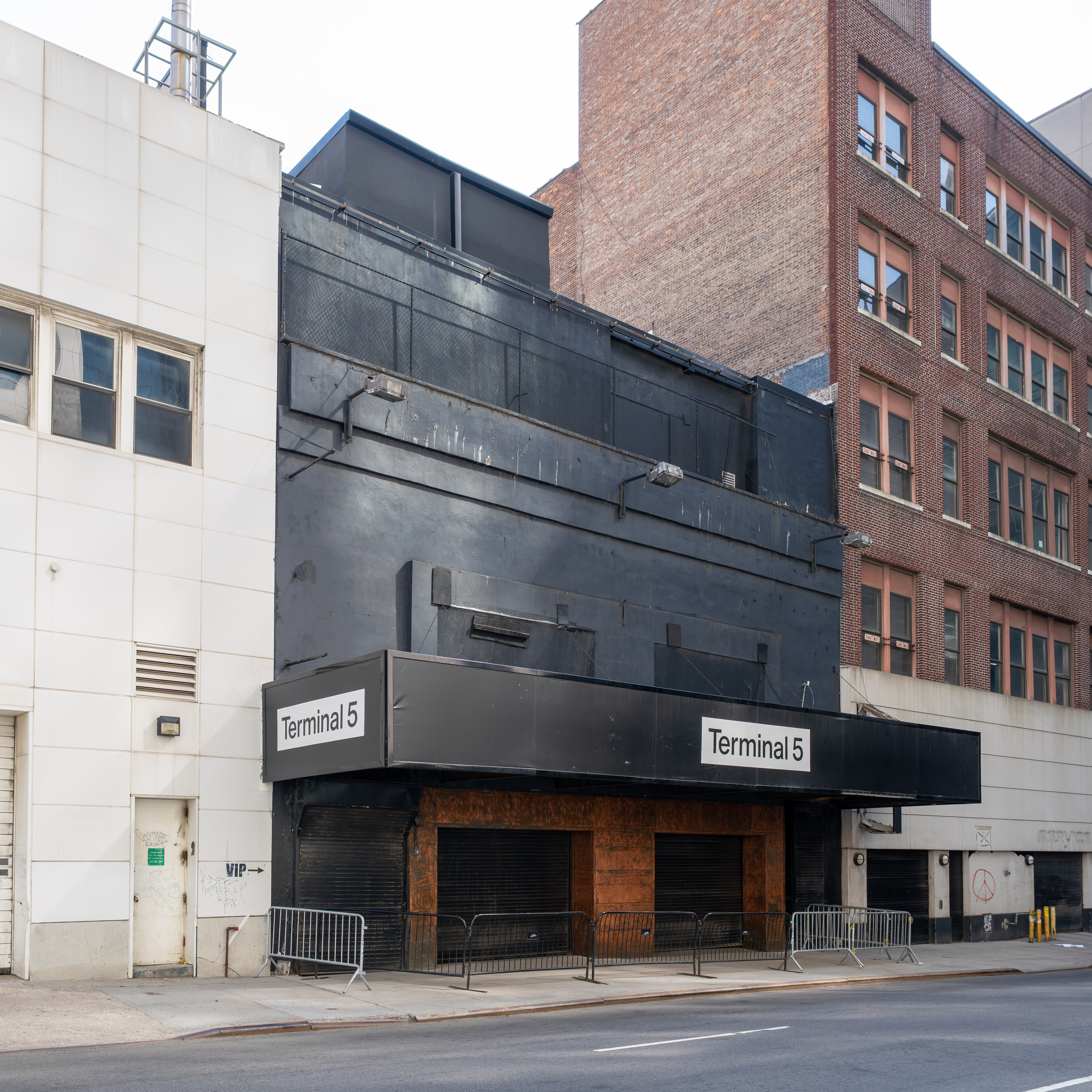
- The exterior of Terminal 5 in 2026
- Interactive map of Terminal 5
- Address: 610 West 56th Street
- Location: New York City, New York 10019 U.S.
- Coordinates: 40.76965°N 73.99275°W
- Owner: The Bowery Presents
- Capacity: 3,000
- Type: Music venue
- Public transit: New York City Subway: at 59th Street–Columbus Circle station NYCT Bus: M5, M7, M10, M12, M20, M104; MTA Bus: BxM2

Construction
- Opened: October 2, 2007
- Architects: Brian Swier and Michael Costantin

Website
- terminal5nyc.com

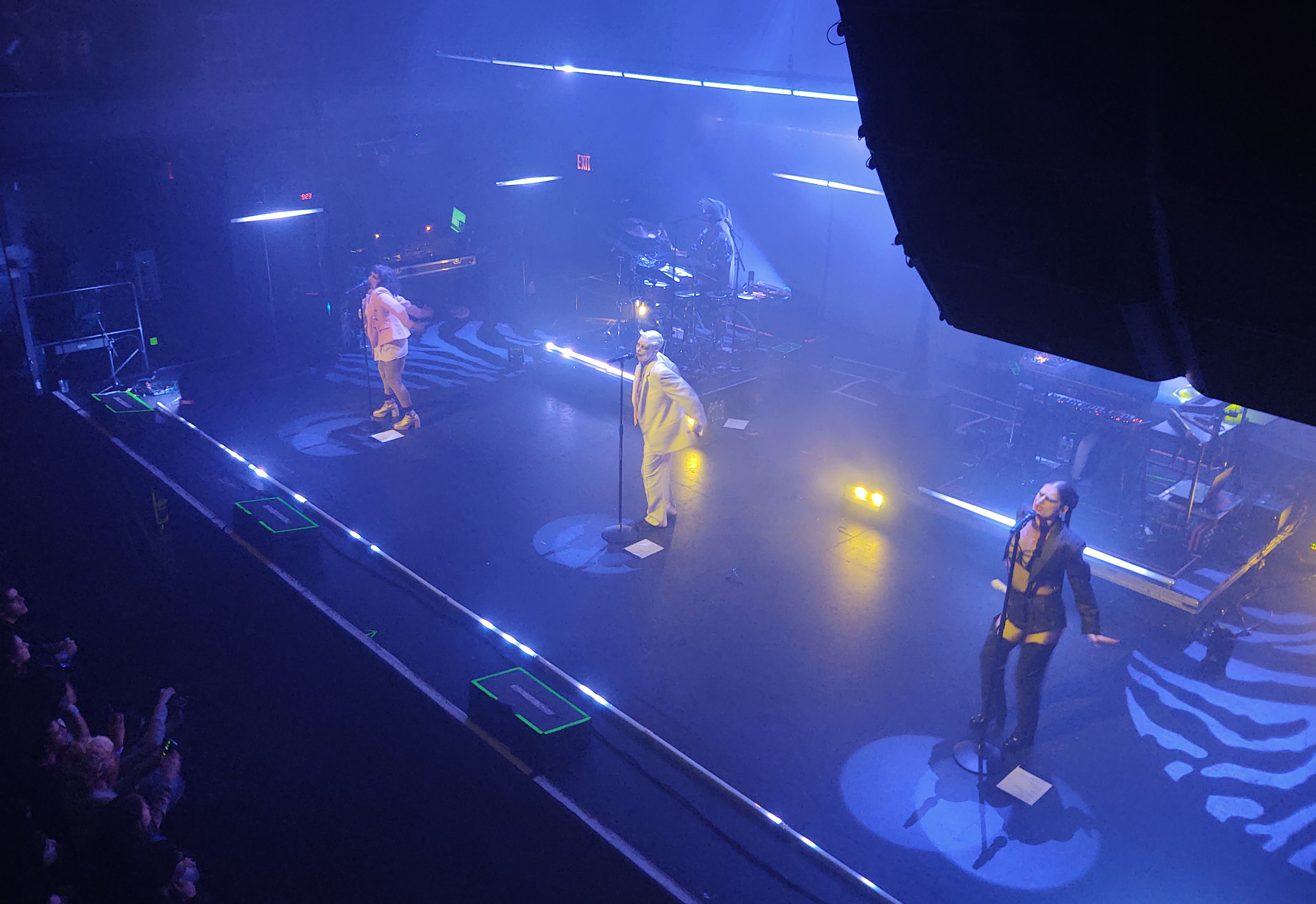
Fever Ray performing at Terminal 5, seen from the second floor balcony

Terminal 5 is a music venue in the Hell's Kitchen, Manhattan neighborhood of New York City, located at 610 West 56th Street west of Eleventh Avenue. It has a multi-level event site with five distinct room environments and a capacity of 3,000 people.

Alcoholic beverages are served during events along with light snacks. On most nights, a smoking section and bar are open on the roof deck. The venue is operated by The Bowery Presents.

== History ==
The building originated as an industrial warehouse before being adapted into a nightlife venue in the late 1990s with minimal structural modifications. In 1997, promoter David Marvisi opened a nightclub in the space named Mirage. It soon changed its name to Carbon, but closed after violations for liquor sales to minors.

In 1999, the building reopened as Club Exit with a $9 million renovation. Club Exit closed on February 7, 2003 by the Drug Enforcement Administration, when the NYPD's Narcotics Division raided and shut down the venue following a 22-month undercover investigation that uncovered rampant drug use and sales on the premises. In its over three-year existence, Club Exit was the home of 170 arrests, including 50 for drug sales inside the club, with 11 individuals recently prosecuted for narcotics distribution; authorities documented 89 undercover drug purchases between 2000 and 2003 alone.

The Bowery Presents soon acquired the venue and renovated it for live music shows, and with a capacity of 3,000, it became the largest venue operated by the group. Ticket sales started in August 2007, and the first show to take place there was The National on October 2, 2007, with St. Vincent opening.

== Reception ==
Terminal 5 has been negatively reviewed by critics and New York City music fans. In 2026, a Paste article named it the worst venue in New York City, citing its location, layout, sightlines, and environment, along with the 20-25% fee that the venue collected from the merchandise that artists sold there.

== Incidents ==
On April 30, 2017 during a Travis Scott concert, a man was allegedly pushed over a third-floor balcony and left paralyzed from the resulting fall.

On November 19, 2026, four people sustained injuries in a stampede when the DJ for the rapper OsamaSon encouraged the crowd to "rush the merch booth" for an exclusive gift.
