= Blkjuptr =

blkjuptr

EP by Smino
- Released: December 11, 2015
- Recorded: 2015
- Studio: Classick Studios
- Genre: Hip hop; neo soul
- Length: 15:21
- Label: Zero Fatigue; Downtown Records
- Producer: Monte Booker

Smino chronology
S!Ck S!Ck S!Ck (2015)	blkjuptr (2015)	blkswn (2017)

blkjuptr (pronounced "black jupiter") is the second extended play by American rapper Smino. It was released on December 11, 2015 with Zero Fatigue under license to Downtown Records. The EP was later re-released on June 3, 2016 on all digital platforms. Production was handled by Monte Booker, who previously worked with Smino on his S!Ck S!Ck S!Ck EP. He would go on to produce the bulk of his debut album, 2017's blkswn. Guest features came from Jay2 and Julien Bell.

== Background ==
Smino stated that he created Blk Juptr as an escape from alienation on Earth, which is reminiscent of Parliament-Funkadelic and Sun Ra. His goal is an intergalactic flight to a far off, pretend planet; he achieves his mission. Smino also explained in an interview "The black metaphor thing. [What] the song embodies fucking made me wanna just name the whole project, because I was listening to it like damn, it sound like a journey. These five songs sound like a little journey... [blkjuptr] is me feeling like I feel everyday, except when I’m with my friends. If I leave [my friends], I swear to god, if I go out into the world by myself, I feel like a whole ass alien. Most people be on some like systematic, going to work shit. Most people be on some still stuck in racist shit… [The art world is] pretty much like alienating ourselves, but we are like real observant. We just watch the world and get inspired. When I go out there, I be like tenser than a mug. Art world just feels good. You never feel like something gonna happen to you when you go to an art show, bruh."

== Singles and promotion ==
Upon release, the title-track "blkjuptr" was made as the lead single for the EP, with a music video directed by Jacob Chavez released on June 6, 2016. Smino later released a live-performance of "Oxygen" on SBTV.

== Critical reception ==
In a review, James Elliott of Earmilk said "Chicago has been pumping out artists for a few years now, but its next star might actually call St. Louis home. Smino's Blk Juptr is a fantastic sophomore project, and for many a first introduction. It is a multifaceted EP that will take some time to get through, but is worth the time spent." The Chicago Reader claimed "The instrumentals chatter and hum, reverberating with intimacy and quietly blossoming as Booker arranges and rearranges his minimal palette. Smino follows the music's changing moods with his slippery flow, which can shift from a poised croon to a playful, coiled snarl without drawing too much attention to the change. Even in its quietest moments, Blk Juptr sounds bustling." These Days said "blkjuptr is a body of work rooted in Smino’s awareness of his surroundings. As the title track begins, Smino’s saccharine drawl hides in producer Monte Booker’s crescendoing synths. Smi soon makes his presence fully known with a punch, 'Black hoodie / Black timbs / Black leather jacket / Sun beatin on my black skin,' all at once evoking imagery of Trayvon Martin, and symbolically alluding to American black consciousness."

== Track listing ==
No.	Title	Writer(s)	Producer(s)	Length
1.	"Blkjuptr"	Christopher Smith Jr.; Ahmanti Booker	Monte Booker	3:09
2.	"Zoom"	Smith Jr.; Booker	Monte Booker	3:36
3.	"Runnin'" (featuring Jay2)	Smith Jr.; Booker; Jeffrey Smith	Monte Booker	3:19
4.	"Poppa" (featuring Julian Bell)	Smith Jr.; Booker; Julian Bell	Monte Booker	3:14
5.	"Oxygen"	Smith Jr.; Booker	Monte Booker	2:08
Total length:				15:21

Notes

- "Blkjuptr" samples "I Get Lonely" performed by Janet Jackson
- "Zoom" contains an interpolation of "Rump Shaker" performed by Wreckx-n-Effect
