= Zero Fatigue =

American musical collective and record label

- Founded: 2014–present
- Founder: Smino
- Genre: Hip hop; neo soul; electro funk
- Country of origin: United States
- Location: St. Louis, Missouri; Chicago, Illinois
- Official website: zerofatigue.com

Zero Fatigue is an American musical collective and independent record label with a split-base in both St. Louis, Missouri and Chicago, Illinois. The collective was founded by Smino and includes artists and producers Monte Booker, Ravyn Lenae, JayBaby TheGreaty, and Nosidam. The label is run by Chris "Classick" Innumerable.

== History ==
The collective's origins began when Smino met Chris "Classick" Innumerable at Columbia College Chicago, who owned a recording studio in his house in Chicago and later became his manager. Interning for Classick, engineer and mixer Elton "L10MixedIt" Chueng met Smino in that studio where they began working together. In 2012, they met rappers Bari Allen and Jay2 and producer Monte Booker while making music together and formed the collective Zero Fatigue after creating a song of the same title, with lyrics "Zero Fatigue, I'm out of my league". The crew later expanded and added members Ravyn Lenae and Nosidam. Unofficial members and affiliates of Zero Fatigue include Jean Deaux, Drea Smith, and Phoelix. Zero Fatigue is a collective creating a safe space for homegrown artists to harvest their raw talent and demonstrate a futuristic funk element of rap.

== Members ==
Current acts

- Smino
- Ravyn Lenae
- NOS.
- JayBaby TheGreaty

In-house producers

- Monte Booker
- Phoelix
- Groove
- VZN

Studio personnel

- Chris "Classick" Innumerable
- Elton "L10MixedIt" Chueng
- Jeffrey "Jeffontheboards" Thompson

Former members

- Bari (now known as Young Pink)
- Jay2

== Discography ==
=== Studio albums ===
Artist	Album	Details
Smino	blkswn	Released: March 14, 2017; Label: Zero Fatigue, Downtown; Format: CD, digital download
Smino	NØIR	Released: November 8, 2018; Label: Zero Fatigue, Downtown, Interscope; Format: CD, digital download
Bari	MSTRGLSS	Released: February 1, 2019; Label: Zero Fatigue, Downtown, Interscope; Format: Digital download
JayBaby TheGreaty	The Last Dragon	Released: June 11, 2021; Label: Zero Fatigue, Ugly Heart Entertainment; Format: Digital download
Smino	Luv 4 Rent	Released: October 28, 2022; Label: Zero Fatigue, Motown; Format: Digital download

=== Mixtapes ===
Artist	Album	Details
Smino	She Already Decided	Released: April 20, 2020; Label: Self-released; Format: Digital download
JayBaby TheGreaty	White Belt	Released: February 11, 2022; Label: Zero Fatigue, Ugly Heart, Records by Anwar Carrots; Format: Digital download
JayBaby TheGreaty	Yellow Belt	Released: April 1, 2022; Label: Zero Fatigue, Ugly Heart, Records by Anwar Carrots; Format: Digital download
JayBaby TheGreaty	Orange Belt	Released: May 5, 2022; Label: Zero Fatigue, Ugly Heart, Records by Anwar Carrots; Format: Digital download
JayBaby TheGreaty	Green Belt	Released: July 1, 2022; Label: Zero Fatigue, Ugly Heart, Records by Anwar Carrots; Format: Digital download
JayBaby TheGreaty	Blue Belt	Released: August 12, 2022; Label: Zero Fatigue, Ugly Heart, Records by Anwar Carrots; Format: Digital download
JayBaby TheGreaty	Red Belt	Released: October 20, 2022; Label: Zero Fatigue, Ugly Heart, Records by Anwar Carrots; Format: Digital download

=== Extended plays ===
Artist	Album	Details
Smino	S!Ck S!Ck S!Ck	Released: October 2, 2015; Label: Zero Fatigue; Format: Digital download
Smino	blkjuptr	Released: December 11, 2015; Label: Zero Fatigue; Format: Digital download
Bari	Prefix	Released: September 10, 2018; Label: Zero Fatigue; Format: Digital download
Jay2	4 Tha Wait	Released: July 24, 2019; Label: Zero Fatigue; Format: Digital download
JayBaby TheGreaty	Water	Released: December 4, 2020; Label: Zero Fatigue; Format: Digital download
