= Monte Booker =

American musician

- Born: Ahmanti Booker; March 27, 1995 (age 31); Chicago, Illinois, U.S.
- Genres: Hip hop; electro funk; jazz fusion; house; neo soul
- Occupations: Record producer; DJ
- Instruments: FL Studio; keyboard; OP-1 Synthesizer
- Years active: 2013–present
- Label: Zero Fatigue

Ahmanti Booker (born March 27, 1995), professionally known as Monte Booker, is an American record producer from Chicago, Illinois. He is part of the musical collective Zero Fatigue, and has worked with artists such as Smino, Ravyn Lenae, Noname, Saba, Mick Jenkins, Sango, Ari Lennox and JID, among others.

== Career ==
Monte Booker grew up in the South Side of Chicago listening to artists such as Outkast, Gucci Mane, Radiohead and Coldplay. He started producing in 2011 with FL Studio incorporating trap music and jazz as well as organic sounds in his music. In 2013, he met St. Louis artists Smino, Jay2 and Bari through studio manager Chris Classick, and joined the collective Zero Fatigue, along with Ravyn Lenae. He also became a member of Soulection Radio and released an EP on October 23, 2015, as part of their White Label series. The song "Kolors" became a viral hit in 2020 from TikTok streams, entering the Spotify's Viral 50 Charts.

Booker went on to produce projects for Zero Fatigue such as blkjuptr, Moon Shoes, Midnight Moonlight, blkswn, Noir, and MSTRGLSS. In 2016, he also worked with Chicago artists Noname, Mick Jenkins, and Saba on the albums Telefone, The Healing Component, and Bucket List Project.

In 2019, Booker was invited to Dreamville's recording sessions for the compilation Revenge of the Dreamers III by J. Cole. He produced three songs on the album, "Late Night", "Spin Move", and "Passcode". In 2020 and 2021, he has worked with other artists including Spillage Village and VanJess. On February 1, 2021, Booker released an instrumental mixtape titled Lil Sounds Tape.

== Artistry ==
Monte Booker has credited producers such as Timbaland, Flying Lotus, The Neptunes, and Kanye West, as his major influences. Speaking about this, he said "what [they were] doing with music kind of inspired me to incorporate my influence to make it my own type of vibe." His sound has been described as percussive and organic production with "an eclectic amalgamation of Hip-Hop, R&B, and melody-heavy electronic sounds."

== Discography ==
=== Extended plays ===
- Soulection White Label: 016 (2015)

=== Instrumental mixtapes ===
- Lil Sounds Tape (2021)

== Production discography ==
=== 2014 ===
==== Smino - Smellin Like a Re-Up ====
- 00. "Smellin Like a Re-Up"

=== 2015 ===
==== Smino - S!Ck S!Ck S!Ck ====
- 01. "Ruby Red"
- 02. "Ballet" (featuring Bari)
- 03. "Raw"

==== Ravyn Lenae - Moon Shoes ====
- 01. "Venezuela Trains"
- 03. "Blossom Dearie"
- 04. "Recess"
- 05. "Free Room"
- 06. "Sleep Talking"
- 08. "Everything Above"

==== Monte Booker - Soulection White Label: 016 ====
- 01. "Flight"
- 02. "Kolors" (featuring Smino)
- 03. "Homealone"
- 04. "Baby" (featuring Ravyn Lenae)

==== Smino - Blkjuptr ====
- 01. "Blkjuptr"
- 02. "Zoom"
- 03. "Runnin'" (featuring Jay2)
- 04. "Poppa" (featuring Julian Bell)
- 05. "Oxygen"

==== Smino - Ciabatta ====
- 00. "Ciabatta"

=== 2016 ===
==== Smino - Kajun ====
- 00. "Kajun" (featuring Jean Deaux & Phoelix)

==== Ravyn Lenae - Alive ====
- 00. "Alive"

==== Noname - Telefone ====
- 02. "Sunny Duet" (with theMIND) (produced with Cam O'bi)

==== Mick Jenkins - The Healing Component ====
- 14. "Angles" (featuring Xavier Omär & Noname) (produced with Cam O'bi & THEMpeople)

==== Saba - Bucket List Project ====
- 12. "California" (featuring Ravyn Lenae & Phoelix) (produced with Phoelix & Daoud)

=== 2017 ===
==== Ravyn Lenae - Midnight Moonlight ====
- 02. "Unknown"
- 03. "Spice" (solo or remix with Smino)
- 04. "Hiatus (Interlude)"
- 05. "Oxygen"
- 06. "Sleep Talking"

==== Sango - De Mim, Pra Você ====
- 06. "Bem-Estar"

==== Smino - Blkswn ====
- 01. "Wild Irish Roses"
- 02. "Maraca"
- 03. "Glass Flows"
- 04. "Flea Flicka" (featuring Bari)
- 05. "Spit Shine"
- 06. "Netflix & Dusse"
- 07. "Anita"
- 08. "Lobby Kall"
- 09. "Edgar Allen Poe'd Up" (featuring theMIND)
- 11. "B Role"
- 12. "Blkoscars" (featuring Jay2)
- 14. "Long Run" (featuring Via Rosa) (produced with Phoelix)
- 15. "Innamission"
- 16. "Silk Pillows" (featuring Akenya) (produced with THEMpeople)
- 17. "Ricky Millions" (featuring Drea Smith) (produced with J. Bird)
- 18. "Amphetamine" (featuring Bari, Jean Deaux & Noname) (produced with Phoelix & J.Robb)

==== Roseangelica - Butta ====
- 00. "Butta"

==== Bari - Protein ====
- 00. "Protein"

==== Hoosier Scott - Shade Spectrum ====
- 04. "How Would I?"

==== Didi Park - Neon Bandages ====
- 06. "B&W Movies are Voodoo" (produced with JNTHN STEIN)
- 08. "Method Acting"

==== Zero Fatigue - Manegos ====
- 00. "Manegos" (featuring Bari, Smino, and Jay2)

==== Monte Booker - KOMPANY ====
- 00. "KOMPANY" (featuring Phoelix & Smino)

=== 2018 ===
==== Phoelix - TEMPO ====
- 14. "Taranphoeno" (featuring Smino and Jean Deaux) (produced with Phoelix)

==== KYLE - Light of Mine ====
- 11. "ShipTrip"

==== Smino - NØIR ====
- 03. "Klink"
- 05. "Spinz"
- 06. "Summer Salt" (featuring Bari)
- 07. "Z4L" (featuring Bari & Jay2)
- 08. "Merlot"
- 09. "We Got The Biscuits"
- 12. "Low Down Derrty Blues"
- 13. "Fenty Sex" (featuring Dreezy)
- 14. "Bam 2x"
- 18. "Verizon" (produced with Da-P)

==== Bari - The Prefix ====
- 01. "Tortas"
- 02. "Glacier"
- 03. "Intrigue" (featuring Smino)

==== Zara Bash - Heaven on Earth ====
- 05. "Bad4Me" (featuring Ty Safari)

=== 2019 ===
==== Young Pink - MSTRGLSS ====
- 01. "Ooze"
- 04. "Relax"
- 05. "Ice Cup"
- 06. "Eya"
- 08. "Luhbish"
- 10. "Caress"
- 11. "Fluid"
- 12. "Joi"
- 13. "Stamina"

==== Ash Jetson - 814CK.HO13 ====
- 04. "used to."

==== Monte Booker - Interstellar ====
- 00. "Interstellar" (featuring Bari)

==== Jay2 - 4 Tha Wait ====
- 01. "Are You OK?"
- 02. "Pomegranate"
- 04. "Dork" (featuring Smino)
- 05. "Dropped"
- 07. "Shoppin'"

==== MFnMelo - What a Life ====
- 00. What a Life (featuring Saba)

==== MFnMelo- Everybody Eats ====
- 04. "Flow Seats"
- 09. "Notice"
- 10. "What a Life" (featuring Saba)

==== ICECOLDBISHOP - Creep ====
- 00. Creep (featuring Mick Jenkins) (produced with Naz)

==== Smino - High 4 Da Highladays ====
- 01. "Sleigh" (featuring Monte Booker & Masego) (produced with Masego)

=== 2020 ===
==== Dreamville - Revenge of the Dreamers III: Director's Cut ====
- 22. "Late Night" (with Cozz and Omen featuring Buddy and Landstrip Chip)
- 23. "Spin Move" (with Bas featuring Saba, Smino and The Hics)
- 26. "Passcode" (with Ari Lennox featuring Buddy, Smino, Mez and Guapdad 4000) (produced with Christo)

==== Ravyn Lenae - Insecure: Music From The HBO Original Series, Season 4 ====
- 09. "Rewind" (produced with Phoelix)

==== Hansel Mac - Limbo ====
- 01. "Mario" (featuring Saiki Music & Zagor)

==== Smino - Madden NFL 21 ====
- 14. "Backstage Pass" (with Monte Booker and The Drums)

==== Spillage Village - Spilligion ====
- 06. "Judas" (with JID featuring Ari Lennox, Buddy, Chance the Rapper and Masego) (additional production from Mesita)

==== Femdot - Buy One, Get One Free Vol. 1 ====
- 01. "Lifetime" (featuring Saba)

==== Bari - Fuck It... Burn It All Down ====
- 13. "One Night"
- 15. "Heart Is Valuable"

==== Plvto - Hangout 4 ====
- 04. "Apple"
- 06. "Hues"

==== Florence The Infinite - This Ain't That ====
- 00. "This Ain't That" (featuring Bunge)

==== Lord Red - Tired ====
- 00. "Tired"

=== 2021 ===
==== Monte Booker - Lil Sounds Tape ====
- 01. "Maple"
- 02. "Stay"
- 03. "Feels Good"
- 04. "Astro"
- 05. "Shordie"
- 06. "I Been Rollin" (produced with Phoelix)
- 07. "Transition"
- 08. "I Luv U All"
- 09. "FM"

==== VanJess - Homegrown ====
- 03. "Roses" (produced with Da-P)

==== Jay2 - Send Heartss ====
- 02. "As Cold As It Gets"

==== Symphani Soto - Energy ====
- 00. "Energy"

==== reggie - Ain't Gon Stop Me ====
- 00. "Ain't Gon Stop Me" (produced with Kenny Beats)

==== Felly - Everybody Loves You ====
- 00. "Everybody Loves You" (featuring Kota the Friend)

==== Vince Staples - Vince Staples ====
- 05. "Taking Trips" (produced with Kenny Beats)

==== Pink Siifu - Gumbo'! ====
- 15. "Voicemails Uptown" (featuring Monte Booker, Turich Benjy, Lance Skiiiwalker, JayBee Lamahj, VCR & Nelson Bandela)

==== Shane Eagle - Skydream ====
- 00. "Skydream"

==== Maxo Kream - Weight of the World ====
- 07. "Don't Play With Shawty Ass" (produced with Naz)
- 11. "Whole Lotta" (produced with Teej)
- 16. "Believe" (featuring Don Toliver) (produced with Smino)

==== Mick Jenkins - Elephant In the Room ====
- 09. "Truffles" (produced with Renzell)

=== 2022 ===
==== Saba - Few Good Things ====
- 08. "A Simpler Time" (featuring Mereba) (produced with Daoud & Jacob Rochester)

==== JayBaby TheGreaty - Orange Belt ====
- 07. "2 Fired Up"

==== Ravyn Lenae - Hypnos ====
- 02. "Venom"
- 08. "Higher"
- 09. "3D" (featuring Smino) (produced with Phoelix)
- 10. "Satellites" (produced with Luke Titus & Steve Lacy)
- 11. "Lullabye"

==== JID - The Forever Story ====
- 01. "Galaxy"
- 12. "Just in Time" (featuring Kenny Mason and Lil Wayne) (produced with Christo)
- 15. "Lauder Too" (featuring Ravyn Lenae and Eryn Allen Kane) (produced with James Blake, Thundercat and Groove)

==== Pandi - #Batposting ====
- 01. "Precious"

==== Mavi - Laughing So Hard It Hurts ====
- 03. "Baking Soda" (produced with Amarahbeats)
- 12. "Trip" (featuring Amindi) (produced with AmarahBeats)

==== Smino - Luv 4 Rent ====
- 01. "4rm Da Source"
- 02. "No L's" (produced with Karl Banx)
- 03. "90 Proof" (featuring J. Cole) (produced with Groove)
- 04. "Pro Freak" (featuring Doechii & Fatman Scoop) (produced with Childish Major, Phoelix, DJ Dahi & Nami)
- 05. "Ole Ass Kendrick" (produced with prodxvzn)
- 06. "Louphoria" (featuring Cruza) (produced with Adam Sylvester, AJ Thomas & AmarahBeats)
- 07. "Blu Billy"
- 09. "Modennaminute" (featuring Lucky Daye & Phoelix) (produced with Phoelix)
- 11. "Garden Lady" (produced with Smino, Sucuki & Phoelix)
- 12. "Settle Down" (featuring Cory Henry & Ravyn Lenae) (produced with Charlie Myles)
- 14. "Curtains" (produced with Cory Henry)

== Tours ==
Headlining

- European Tour (with Smino) (2016)
- Europe Tour (2017)
- Kouple Drillz Tour (with Smino) (2018)
- North America Tour (with Soulection) (2018)

Supporting

- ITCO Tour (with Sango) (2018)
