= She Already Decided =

Mixtape by Smino
- Released: April 20, 2020
- Genre: Hip hop; R&B; soul
- Length: 37:54
- Producer: Caleb James; Chef Tate; Delfino Mack; Groove; Jay Card; JeffOnTheBoards; Kal Banx; Nice Rec; Phoelix; Smino; Solomon Fox; VZN

Smino chronology
Noir (2018)	She Already Decided (2020)	Luv 4 Rent (2022)

She Already Decided is the second mixtape by American rapper Smino. It was released on April 20, 2020. The mixtape includes guest appearances from Sevyn Streeter, T-Pain, Bari, JayBaby TheGreaty, and Rizz Capolatti. Production on the mixtape came from Groove, Kal Banx, VZN, and Phoelix among others.

== Background ==
Smino announced the mixtape on his website by posting the link on social media. The mixtape was put together while self-isolating, with some of the songs being recorded in 2020. The website included a statement from Smino, referring to the COVID-19 pandemic in the United States, saying:

I made [this] shit at the crib [for real, trying to] stay sane and inspired as much as I can mane, been smoking distancing from [the] world. Crazy how hard distance hit... Shit different [right now]. So I just cooked some fun shit, real free shit. Ain't [nothing] perfect, all unmastered and raw.

The mixtape was also intended to serve as a teaser, prior to the release of his third studio album. In an interview with Wonderland, Smino spoke on his dedication to a life of creativity and success saying, "it makes it harder to have some shit to relate to, or have shit other people relate to, because you're just not there anymore. That's why I try and stay real." Smino explained the title of the mixtape on the song "Already":

"When I'm talking 'bout she already decided, I'm not talking 'bout no particular woman. I'm talking 'bout the mother, mother nature. She already decided what it's gon' be like. It ain't up to you no more, it's above me."

== Critical reception ==
In a positive review, HipHopDX said "While a sudden release from a rising artist isn’t enough to cure the pandemic blues, Smino is doing his best to help. The St. Louis rapper and singer dropped his new mixtape." They rated the mixtape a score of 3.9 out of 5, noting that Smino gets experimental, regularly shifts his flow and even increases the pitch of his voice at times, with quality technical performances on the mixtape. The Chicago Reader wrote about the mixtape's format saying "the Saint Louis native provided a sly history lesson for young listeners who’ve only ever referred to full-lengths as “projects.” A decade ago, hip-hop mixtapes provided a way for rappers to skirt record-deal obligations, providing them an unregulated outlet where they could remake the hot tracks of the moment and flex their creative muscles." The review continues to say Smino "approaches each track with understated cool and his unmistakable smoothness, infusing joy into every well-rounded syllable and slip-sliding verse. Smino knows that a great mixtape has to be fun, and She Already Decided gives us a way to make our own cheer while we’re stuck indoors."

== Track listing ==
No.	Title	Producer(s)	Length
1.	"Fronto Isley"		3:13
2.	"S.A.D. Lil Intro"	Groove	1:57
3.	"Gotta List"	Kal Banx	1:08
4.	"Popeyes"	Kal Banx	1:35
5.	"Already" (featuring JayBaby TheGreaty)	VZN	2:54
6.	"Cabbage (Freestyle)"		2:06
7.	"Mike Jones" (featuring Rizz Capolatti)	Groove; Solomon Fox	3:01
8.	"Kotton Kandy" (featuring Sevyn Streeter)	Delfino Mack	3:16
9.	"Good Ol Julio"	Caleb James; Phoelix	2:39
10.	"Blac Soda (Freestyle)"		1:41
11.	"2MuchFronto" (featuring Bari)	Groove	1:58
12.	"Chips & Juice"	Groove; Nice Rec; Jay Card	2:40
13.	"Jamie Boxx (Freestyle)"		1:27
14.	"O'HighO"	JeffOnTheBoards; Chef Tate	2:24
15.	"Year of the Goat"	Groove; Solomon Fox	2:54
16.	"Klink (Remix)" (featuring T-Pain)	Phoelix	3:01
Total length:			37:54

Sample credits

- "Fronto Isley" contains a sample from "For the Love of You", performed by The Isley Brothers.
- "Popeyes" contains a sample from "Chickenhead", performed by Project Pat.
- "Cabbage (Freestyle)" contains a sample from "Savage", performed by Megan Thee Stallion.
- "Blac Soda (Freestyle) contains a sample from "Orange Soda", performed by Baby Keem.
- "Jamie Boxx (Freestyle)" contains a sample from "The Box", performed by Roddy Ricch.
- "O'HighO" contains a sample from "Full of Smoke", performed by Christión.
