= Sango (musician) =

- Born: Kai Asa Savon Wright; October 1, 1991 (age 34); Seattle, Washington, U.S.
- Origin: Grand Rapids, Michigan
- Genres: Electronic; hip hop; R&B; dance
- Occupations: DJ; record producer
- Years active: 2010–present
- Labels: Soulection; Last Gang; Entertainment One

Kai Asa Savon Wright (born October 1, 1991), known by his stage name Sango, is an American DJ and record producer from Seattle, Washington.

== Personal life ==
Sango was born October 1, 1991, in Seattle, Washington. His parents were both musicians. He relocated to Grand Rapids, Michigan at age nine. In 2015, he graduated from Western Michigan University with a BFA in graphic design. Shortly after graduating, he relocated to back to Seattle. His professional name comes from a female character in the anime/manga Inuyasha.

In 2015, Wright married Angela Lopez-Wright. In September 2016, Wright announced the birth of their first child, born on September 17, 2016; a boy.

In 2025, Sango was announced as one of the remixers for the 2026 FIFA World Cup theme, representing Seattle.

== Style and influences ==
Sango produces music across multiple genres, but primarily makes dance music that heavily samples jazz and soul, in keeping with the rest of the Soulection collective. His main genres are house, techno, and hip-hop. Sango has contributed production to projects from R&B singers Tinashe, Ravyn Lenae, and Bryson Tiller; pop singers PinkPantheress and Christina Aguilera; and rappers Wale, MadeinTYO, and Smino.

Sango's music is largely influenced by his experience growing up on the internet, synthesizing various disparate influences. Chief among his artistic influences is LA jazz/electronic producer Flying Lotus, whom he discovered as a teenager. Sango frequently cites his parents, both of whom were musicians, as being a large part of why he began making music. His mother – a pianist, trumpeter, and drummer – is featured on his debut album "North" on the song "Until Saturday," which also features Australian producer Ta-ku. The album "Also Tracey" is named for and dedicated to her as well.

The nation of Brazil is also a strong influence on his music, with much of his music incorporating elements of baile funk. His initial introduction to the genre was through the Call of Duty video game series. He has also noted his love of dancehall music.

Sango has cited Kaytranada, Mount Kimbie, James Blake, Timbaland, J Dilla, The Neptunes, DJ Quik, Drake producer Noah "40" Shebib, Madlib, the aforementioned Flying Lotus, and Jake One as the producers with the most influence on his music.

== Discography ==
=== Studio albums ===
- North (2013)
- In the Comfort Of (2018)
- North Vol. 2 (2024)

=== Extended Plays ===
- Unfinished & Satisfied (2010)
- As Always (2011)
- Sounds of Chimera (2011)
- Also Tracey (2011)
- There's Eugene (2011)
- Trust Me (2012)
- Otra Vez (2012)
- Da Rocinha (2012)
- Until Then (w/ Waldo) (2014)
- Da Rocinha 2 (2014)
- Hours Spent Loving You (w/ Xavier Omär) (2015)
- 2009–2012 Tapes (2015)
- Da Rocinha 3 (2015)
- Mais Mais Mais (2016)
- Tomorrow (w/ Dave B.) (2016)
- De Mim, Pra Você (2017)
- Make Me Well (2019)
- Acima (w/ VHOOR) (2019)
- Calder Program Series 1-3 (2019)
- Moments Spent Loving You (w/ Xavier Omär) (2019)
- Grove (w/ Waldo & Savon) (2019)
- Fufu & Grits (w/ Juls) (2020)
- SANGOZINHO (2020)
- Da Rocinha 4 (2020)
- SHANGO (2020)
- MearlGo (w/ Earlly Mac) (2021)
- MearlGo Vol. 2 (w/ Earlly Mac) (2021)
- Lake Effect (w/ Waldo) (2021)
- MearlGo Vol. 3 (w/ Earlly Mac) (2021)
- Great Lakes Influence (2022)
- MearlGo Vol. 4 (w/ Earlly Mac) (2023)

=== Mixtapes ===
- More Balloons (The Weeknd Remixes) (2011)

=== Remixes ===
- Frank Ocean – "Cayendo"
- Frank Ocean – “Nights”
