= JID discography =

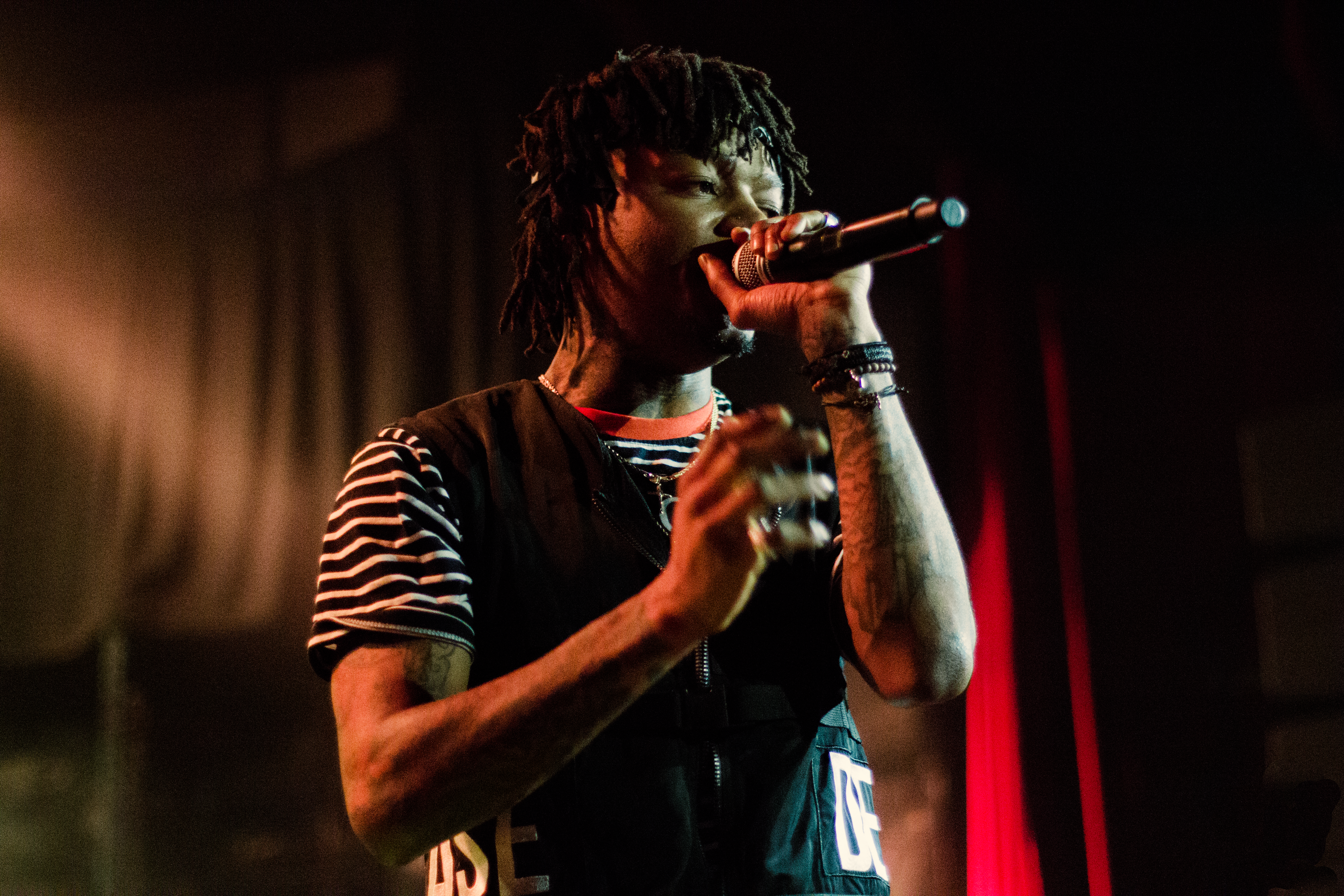
- JID performing in December 2017
- Studio albums: 4
- EPs: 2
- Live albums: 1
- Compilation albums: 2
- Singles: 25
- Music videos: 21
- Collaborative EPs: 2
- Mixtapes: 7
- Collaborative albums: 4

American rapper JID (also stylized J.I.D) has released four studio albums, two compilation albums, two extended plays (EP), seven mixtapes, one live album, and twenty-five singles.

JID's debut studio album, The Never Story, was released on March 10, 2017. It peaked at number 197 on the US Billboard 200 chart. The album features guest appearances from 6lack, EarthGang and Mereba. The album's lead single, "Never", was released prior to the album. JID's lyrics detail a narrative on his upbringing in East Atlanta.

On November 26, 2018, JID released his second studio album, DiCaprio 2. It serves as a sequel to his extended play DiCaprio released in 2015. The album was supported by two singles, "151 Rum" and "Off Deez" featuring J. Cole. The album features guest appearances from 6lack, ASAP Ferg, BJ the Chicago Kid, Ella Mai, J. Cole, Joey Badass and Method Man.

On August 26, 2022, JID released his third studio album The Forever Story.

On May 8, 2025, JID released a video trailer on YouTube for his upcoming fourth studio album God Does Like Ugly, which was preceded by a single release of "WRK" on April 18.

On July 4, 2025, JID released GDLU (Preluxe), after announcing it through a freestyle released on YouTube. An EP featuring Eminem, Lil Yachty and 6lack, it was a build-up to his album God Does Like Ugly, which featured four tracks that were supposed to be on the album, but were not included eventually. The collaboration with Eminem was also released as a single.

== Albums ==
=== Studio albums ===
Title	Album details	Peak chart positions										Certifications
Title	Album details	US	US R&B/HH	US Rap	AUS	BEL (FL)	CAN	IRE	NLD	NZ	UK	Certifications
The Never Story	Released: March 10, 2017; Label: Dreamville, Interscope, Spillage Village; Format: Vinyl, digital download	197	—	—	—	—	—	—	—	—	—	
DiCaprio 2	Released: November 26, 2018; Label: Dreamville, Interscope, Spillage Village; Format: Vinyl, digital download	41	21	17	—	142	52	85	113	—	—	RMNZ: Gold
The Forever Story	Released: August 26, 2022; Label: Dreamville, Interscope, Spillage Village; Format: Vinyl, digital download	12	8	6	42	65	—	50	59	16	74	RIAA: Gold; RMNZ: Gold
God Does Like Ugly	Released: August 8, 2025; Label: Dreamville, Interscope; Format: Vinyl, CD, digital download	11	4	2	42	90	29	73	53	12	69	
"—" denotes a recording that did not chart or was not released in that territory.

=== Mixtapes ===
Title	Album details
Connie Mixtape V1	Released: 2009; Format: Digital download
James Hall Mixtape V2	Released: April 8, 2010; Format: Digital download
Cakewalk	Released: May 18, 2010; Format: Digital download
Cakewalk 2	Released: June 29, 2011; Format: Digital download
Hidden By The City (with EarthGang)	Released: September 28, 2011; Format: Digital download
Route of All Evil	Released: June 25, 2012; Format: Digital download
Para Tu	Released: October 22, 2013; Format: Digital download

=== Compilation albums ===
List of albums, with selected chart positions
Title	Details	Peak chart positions			Certifications
Title	Details	US	US R&B/HH	US Rap	Certifications
Revenge of the Dreamers III (with Dreamville)	Released: July 5, 2019; Label: Dreamville, Interscope; Format: CD, LP, digital download	1	1	1	RIAA: Platinum
D-Day: A Gangsta Grillz Mixtape (with Dreamville)	Released: March 31, 2022; Label: Dreamville, Interscope; Format: Digital download	11	6	4	

=== Collaborative albums ===
List of albums, with selected chart positions
Title	Details	Peak chart positions
Title	Details	US
Bears Like This (with Spillage Village)	Released: February 2, 2014; Label: Spillage Village; Format: Digital download	—
Bears Like This Too (with Spillage Village)	Released: July 6, 2015; Label: Spillage Village; Format: Digital download	—
Bears Like This Too Much (with Spillage Village)	Released: December 2, 2016; Label: Spillage Village; Format: Digital download	—
Spilligion (with Spillage Village and EarthGang)	Released: September 25, 2020; Label: Dreamville, Interscope, SinceThe80s; Format: LP, digital download	141
"—" denotes a recording that did not chart or was not released in that territory.

=== Live albums ===
- Live from NPR's Tiny Desk (2026)

== Extended plays ==
Title	EP details
Lucky Buddha (with Money Makin' Nique)	Released: July 8, 2014; Format: Digital Download
DiCaprio	Released: January 26, 2015; Format: Digital download
Blakkboyz Present Half Doin Dope/Van Gogh (with Lil Yachty)	Released: September 1, 2023; Format: Digital download, streaming
GDLU (Preluxe)	Released: July 4, 2025; Format: Digital download, streaming

== Singles ==
=== As lead artist ===
Title	Year	Peak chart positions										Certifications	Album
Title	Year	US	US R&B/HH	AUS	CAN	FRA	GER	NZ	SWI	UK	WW	Certifications	Album
"Underwear"	2015	—	—	—	—	—	—	—	—	—	—		The Never Story
"Never"	2016	—	—	—	—	—	—	—	—	—	—	RIAA: Gold; ARIA: Gold	The Never Story
"Bruuuh"	2017	—	—	—	—	—	—	—	—	—	—		Non-album single
"Hasta Luego"	2017	—	—	—	—	—	—	—	—	—	—		DiCaprio 2
"151 Rum"	2018	—	—	—	—	—	—	—	—	—	—	RIAA: Platinum; ARIA: Gold	DiCaprio 2
"Off Deez" (featuring J. Cole)	2018	—	—	—	—	—	—	—	—	—	—	RIAA: Platinum; ARIA: Gold	DiCaprio 2
"Down Bad" (with J. Cole, Bas, and EarthGang featuring Young Nudy)	2019	64	26	—	69	—	—	—	—	—	—	RIAA: Platinum; RMNZ: Gold	Revenge of the Dreamers III
"Costa Rica" (with Bas, featuring Guapdad 4000, Reese Laflare, Jace, Mez, Smokepurpp, Buddy, and Ski Mask the Slump God)	2019	75	30	—	71	—	—	—	—	—	—	RIAA: Platinum; RMNZ: Gold	Revenge of the Dreamers III
"End of Daze" (with Spillage Village and EarthGang featuring JurdanBryant, Mereba, and Hollywood JB)	2020	—	—	—	—	—	—	—	—	—	—		Spilligion
"Baguetti" (with Smino and Kenny Beats)	2020	—	—	—	—	—	—	—	—	—	—		Non-album single
"Baptize" (with Spillage Village and EarthGang)	2020	—	—	—	—	—	—	—	—	—	—		Spilligion
"Ballads" (featuring Conway the Machine)	2021	—	—	—	—	—	—	—	—	—	—		Non-album singles
"Cludder"	2021	—	—	—	—	—	—	—	—	—	—		Non-album singles
"Bruuuh" (Remix) (with Denzel Curry)	2021	—	—	—	—	—	—	—	—	—	—		Non-album singles
"Skegee"	2021	—	—	—	—	—	—	—	—	—	—		Non-album singles
"Ambassel"	2021	—	—	—	—	—	—	—	—	—	—		Madden NFL 22
"Enemy" (with Imagine Dragons)	2021	5	—	15	5	32	17	13	21	17	3	RIAA: 4× Platinum; ARIA: 2× Platinum; BPI: Platinum; MC: Gold; RMNZ: 3× Platinum; SNEP: Platinum	Arcane and Mercury – Act 1
"Surround Sound" (featuring 21 Savage and Baby Tate)	2022	40	13	27	27	—	90	21	60	35	49	RIAA: 3× Platinum; ARIA: Platinum; BPI: Gold; MC: Platinum; RMNZ: 2× Platinum	The Forever Story
"Talk About Me" (with Dot da Genius, Denzel Curry, and Kid Cudi)	2022	—	—	—	—	—	—	—	—	—	—		Non-album single
"Dance Now" (with Kenny Mason)	2022	— (Note: "Dance Now" did not enter the Billboard Hot 100, but peaked at number 13 on the Bubbling Under Hot 100 chart.)	43	—	—	—	—	—	— (Note: "Dance Now" did not enter the NZ Top 40 Singles Chart, but peaked at number 16 on the NZ Hot Singles Chart.)	—	—	RIAA: Gold	The Forever Story
"Ma Boy" (with Dreamville and Lute)	2023	—	—	—	—	—	—	—	—	—	—		Creed III: The Soundtrack
"WRK"	2025	—	—	—	—	—	—	— (Note: "WRK" did not enter the NZ Top 40 Singles Chart, but peaked at number 19 on the NZ Hot Singles Chart.)	—	—	—		God Does Like Ugly
"Bodies" (with Offset)	2025	72	18	—	99	—	—	—	—	—	—		Kiari
"Animals (Pt. I)" (featuring Eminem)	2025	—	49	—	—	—	—	— (Note: "Animals" did not enter the NZ Top 40 Singles Chart, but peaked at number 17 on the NZ Hot Singles Chart.)	—	—	—		GDLU (Preluxe)
"Backyard" (with TiaCorine)	2025												Corinian
"Hey Tony!" (with Tony the Tiger)	2026												Non-album single
"A Thousand Times" (with Honey Bxby)	2026												TBA
"—" denotes a recording that did not chart or was not released in that territory.

=== As featured artist ===
List of singles as a featured artist, showing year released and album name
Title	Year	Album
"Can't Call It" (Spillage Village featuring EarthGang, JID, J. Cole, and Bas)	2016	Bears Like This Too Much
"M.O.M." (Spillage Village featuring JID and Quentin Miller)	2017	Bears Like This Too Much
"Meditate" (EarthGang featuring JID)	2017	Rags
"Sandstorm" (Mereba featuring JID)	2019	The Jungle Is the Only Way Out
"Fried Rice" (Bas featuring JID)	2019	Spilled Milk 1
"I Got Money Now" (Deante' Hitchcock featuring JID)	2020	Better
"Like Some Dream" (Sirens of Lesbos featuring JID)	2020	Sol
"Reaper" (Boombox Cartel featuring JID)	2021	Cartel II
"Garden Party" (Masego featuring Big Boi and JID)	2021	Non-album singles
"Home (Remix)" (Mike Dimes featuring JID)	2022	Non-album singles
"Dope" (John Legend featuring JID)	2022	Legend
"Lo Tengo" (Trueno featuring JID)	2022	Bien o Mal
"Smoke Break-Dance" (Mick Jenkins featuring JID)	2023	The Patience
"Van Gogh" (BlakkBoyz featuring JID and Lil Yachty)	2023	Non-album single
"Lights Out" (Bia featuring JID)	2024	Non-album single
"Crazier" (Ab-Soul featuring JID)	2024	Soul Burger
"Insecure" (YG featuring JID and Ab-Soul)	2026	The Gentlemen's Club

== Other charted and certified songs ==
List of songs, with selected chart positions and certifications, showing year released and album name
Title	Year	Peak chart positions					Certifications	Album
Title	Year	US	US R&B/HH	US Rap	CAN	NZ Hot	Certifications	Album
"EdEddnEddy"	2017	—	—	—	—	—	RIAA: Gold	The Never Story
"Workin Out"	2018	—	—	—	—	—	RIAA: Gold	DiCaprio 2
"Stick" (with J. Cole featuring Kenny Mason and Sheck Wes)	2022	71	20	16	81	—		D-Day: A Gangsta Grillz Mixtape
"Raydar"	2022	—	—	—	—	18		The Forever Story
"Crack Sandwich"	2022	—	—	—	—	24		The Forever Story
"Can't Punk Me" (with EarthGang)	2022	—	—	—	—	26		The Forever Story
"Bruddanem" (featuring Lil Durk)	2022	—	—	—	—	23		The Forever Story
"Danger (Spider)" (with Offset)	2023	95	35	25	80	—		Spider-Man: Across the Spider-Verse (Soundtrack from & Inspired by the Motion Picture)
"Fuel" (Eminem and JID)	2024	21	7	6	24	4	RMNZ: Gold	The Death of Slim Shady (Coup de Grâce)
"Behold"	2025	—	—	—	—	37		GDLU (Preluxe)
"YouUgly" (with Westside Gunn)	2025	—	47	—	—	17		God Does Like Ugly
"Glory"	2025	—	46	—	—	19		God Does Like Ugly
"Community" (with Clipse)	2025	—	39	—	—	11		God Does Like Ugly
"Sk8" (with Ciara and EarthGang)	2025	—	—	—	—	21		God Does Like Ugly
"—" denotes a recording that did not chart or was not released in that territory.

== Guest appearances ==
Title	Year	Other artist(s)	Album
"Kick'n It"	2010	EarthGang	The Better Party
"Big Wiggs"	2011	EarthGang	Good News
"Rolling Stoner"	2013	Mereba, EarthGang	Room for Living Remixes
"Exactly"	2014	EarthGang	Shallow Graves for Toys
"Sunday"	2015	EarthGang	Torba
"Momma Told Me"	2015	EarthGang	Strays with Rabbies
"<3"	2015	Curtis Williams, Cam Sheely	Mister Lonely (Deluxe)
"Who Came to Party"	2015	OG Maco	I Made This Shit Before U Guessed It
"Death Match"	2016	Wara from the NBHD	Non-album single
"Vices"	2016	Michael Aristotle	The Michael Aristotle Collection
"Pay the Man (Remix)"	2017	Foster the People, Saba	Non-album single
"Mindfuck"	2017	Da$H	Loose Screw
"New Malcolm X"	2018	Sy Ari da Kid, EarthGang	Better Safe Than Sy Ari
"Sirens"	2018	Denzel Curry	Ta13oo
"Tip Toe"	2018	Pouya	Non-album single
"Paranoid"	2018	Trill Sammy	No Sleep Vol. 1
"Redblue"	2018	Rapsody	9th Wonder Presents: Jamla Is the Squad II
"Soho"	2019	Boogie	Everythings for Sale
"Link Up"	2019	Buddy, Bas, Guapdad 4000, Kent Jamz, Ari Lennox	Harlan & Alondra
"Do It Like Me"	2019	Higher Brothers	Five Stars
"Broke"	2019	Ari Lennox	Shea Butter Baby
"Getting Started"	2019	Aloe Blacc	Hobbs & Shaw
"Wells Fargo (Interlude)"	2019	EarthGang, Buddy, Guapdad 4000	Revenge of the Dreamers III
"Ladies, Ladies, Ladies"	2019	T.I.	Revenge of the Dreamers III
"1993"	2019	Buddy, Smino, Cozz, EarthGang, J. Cole	Revenge of the Dreamers III
"Rembrandt...Run It Back"	2019	J. Cole, Vince Staples	Revenge of the Dreamers III
"Get Away"	2019	BJ the Chicago Kid, Buddy, Kent Jamz	1123
"Iman"	2019	Rapsody, SiR	Eve
"Porno"	2019	IDK, Pusha T	Is He Real?
"On Sight"	2019	Free Nationals, Kadhja Bonet, MIKNNA	Free Nationals
"Ego Check"	2019	Wynne	iF i MAY
"Big Black Truck"	2020	Non-album single	Revenge of the Dreamers III: Director's Cut
"Up Up Away"	2020	EarthGang, Vince Staples	Revenge of the Dreamers III: Director's Cut
"Still Dreamin'"	2020	Lute, 6lack	Revenge of the Dreamers III: Director's Cut
"Far Away II"	2020	Jessie Reyez, A Boogie wit da Hoodie	Before Love Came to Kill Us (Deluxe)
"Hurry Up & Buy"	2020	Hardo	Days Inn
"Quarantine Wifey"	2020	Saint Jhn	While the World Was Burning
"Roots"	2020	Aminé, Charlie Wilson	Limbo
"Lockdown (Remix)"	2020	Anderson Paak, Jay Rock, Noname	Days Inn
"Cereal"	2020	DJ Scheme, IDK, Kenny Mason	Non-album single
"Grip 3:16"	2020	Grip, Kenny Mason	PROBOSCIDEA
"Extinct"	2020	Reason, Isaiah Rashad	New Beginnings
"Not My Problem"	2021	Dua Lipa	Future Nostalgia: The Moonlight Edition
"Somethin' Ain't Right"	2021	Masego, Rapsody	Judas and the Black Messiah: The Inspired Album
"Scatter Brain"	2021	Conway the Machine, Ludacris	La Maquina
"Options"	2021	Doja Cat	Planet Her
"Birdsong"	2021	Lute, Saba	Gold Mouf
"Frozen"	2021	James Blake, SwaVay	Friends That Break Your Heart
"Scenic Drive"	2021	Khalid	Scenic Drive
"Boom"	2022	Token	Pink Is Better
"Waterboyz"	2022	EarthGang, J. Cole	Ghetto Gods
"Ain't No Way"	2022	Denzel Curry, 6lack, Rico Nasty, Jasiah, Powers Pleasant	Melt My Eyez See Your Future
"Lightwerk"	2022	The Cool Kids, 6lack	Before Shit Got Weird
"Barry from Simpson"	2022	2 Chainz, Young Nudy	D-Day: A Gangsta Grillz Mixtape
"Stay There"	2022	T-Shyne, YSL Records	Confetti Nights
"Wanna Be Loved"	2022	Joey Badass	2000
"Danger (Spider)"	2023	Offset	Spider-Man: Across the Spider-Verse (Soundtrack from & Inspired by the Motion Picture)
"In the Room"	2023	Tierra Whack, BJ the Chicago Kid	Creed III
"Zero (Remix)"	2023	NewJeans	Non-album single
"Be Who You Are"	2023	Jon Batiste, NewJeans, Camilo	World Music Radio
"Maynard Vignette"	2023	Killer Mike, Jacquees, T.I.	Michael (Deluxe)
"Mamas PrimeTime"	2023	Westside Gunn, Conway the Machine, Cartier A Williams	And Then You Pray for Me
"Praise God"	2024	French Montana	Mac & Cheese 5
"Sundown"	2024	21 Lil Harold	Non-album single
"Fly Away"	2024	Lyrical Lemonade, Sheck Wes, Ski Mask the Slump God	All Is Yellow
"Fuel"	2024	Eminem	The Death of Slim Shady (Coup de Grâce)
"Woman"	2024	Bktherula	LVL5 P2
"Artificial"	2024	Katy Perry	143
"Gold Feet"	2025	Freddie Gibbs, The Alchemist	Alfredo 2
"To B Honest"	2026	Jill Scott	To Whom This May Concern
"Test Me"	2026	Kenny Mason	Bulldawg
"Catch me if you can"	2026	Joyce Wrice	MACHIKO
“Judy”	2026	Young Nudy	Just Doin Me

== Music videos ==
=== As lead artist ===
List of music videos as lead artist, showing year released and director(s)
Title	Year	Director(s)
"October / 3 Storms" (featuring EarthGang)	2014	Student Union Films
"Never"	2017	Mac Grant, Chad Tennies
"M.O.M."	2017	Chad Tennies, Mac Grant
"D/vision" (featuring EarthGang)	2017	—N/a
"Hereditary"	2017	Mac Grant, Chad Tennies
"EdEddnEddy"	2018	Fred Lozano Jr
"Off Deez" (featuring J. Cole)	2018	Cole Bennett
"Off da Zoinkys"	2019	Scott Lazer
"151 Rum"	2019	Scott Lazer
"Down Bad" (JID, Bas, Yung Nudy, J Cole, and EarthGang)	2019	
"End of Daze" (Spillage Village, EarthGang, and JID featuring JurdanBryant, Mereba, and Hollywood JB)	2020	Caleb Seals
"Baptize" (Spillage Village, EarthGang, and JID featuring Ant Clemons)	2020	Caleb Seals
"Skegee"	2021	Waboosh, JID
"Enemy" (with Imagine Dragons)	2021	Riot Games and Fortiche Production
"Surround Sound" (featuring 21 Savage)	2022	
"Stick Now" (JID, J Cole, Sheck Wes, and Kenny Mason)	2022	—N/a
"Dance Now" (featuring Kenny Mason)	2022	—N/a
"Kody Blu 31"	2022	—N/a
"Money"	2022	—N/a
"Bruddanem / Crack Sandwich"	2022	—N/a
"Ma Boy" (JID and Lute)	2023	Quran Squire
"WRK"	2025	—N/a
"Community" (with Clipse)	2025	Omar Jones

=== As featured artist ===
List of music videos as lead artist, showing year released and director(s)
Title	Year	Director(s)
"Kick'n It" (EarthGang featuring JID)	2011	—N/a
"Momma Told Me" (EarthGang featuring JID)	2016	Chad Tennies, Mac Grant
"Meditate" (EarthGang featuring JID)	2017	Chad Tennies, Mac Grant
"Paranoid" (Trill Sammy featuring JID)	2018	Danny Williams
"Soho" (Boogie featuring JID)	2019	Gina Gammell, Riley Keough
"Sandstorm" (Mereba featuring JID)	2019	Dawit N.M.
"Money Now" (Deante' Hitchcock featuring JID)	2020	—N/a
"Garden Party" (Masego featuring Big Boi and JID)	2021	—N/a
"Scatterbrain" (Conway the Machine featuring Ludacris and JID)	2021	—N/a
"Boom" (Token featuring JID)	2022	Ben Proulx x Token
"Dope" (John Legend featuring JID)	2022	—N/a
"Talk About Me" (Dot da Genius featuring JID, Denzel Curry, and Kid Cudi)	2022	Cole Bennett
"Lo Tengo" (Trueno featuring JID)	2022	—N/a
"Zero (Remix)" (Coca Cola featuring NewJeans and JID)	2023	—N/a
"Smoke Break-Dance" (Mick Jenkins featuring JID)	2023	Andre Muir (Smuggler)
"Van Gogh" (Blakkboyz featuring JID and Lil Yachty)	2023	—N/a
"Sundown" (21 Lil Harold featuring JID)	2024	—N/a
"Fly Away" (Lyrical Lemonade featuring Sheck Wes, JID, and Ski Mask the Slump God)	2024	Cole Bennett
"Lights Out" (Bia featuring JID)	2024	—N/a
