= The Never Story =

Studio album by JID
- Released: March 10, 2017
- Recorded: 2014−2017
- Genres: Hip-hop; jazz rap; neo-soul
- Length: 39:51
- Labels: Dreamville; Interscope; Spillage Village
- Producers: J. Cole (also exec.); Ibrahim Hamad (exec.); Childish Major; Christo; Frank Dukes; Hollywood JB; Latrell James; OZ the Additive; Sean McVerry; SMKA; Tha Officialz; The Imaginary Kids

JID chronology
DiCaprio EP (2015)	The Never Story (2017)	DiCaprio 2 (2018)

Singles from The Never Story
- 1. "Never" Released: December 16, 2016; 2. "D/vision" Released: August 24, 2017; 3. "Hereditary" Released: September 27, 2017; 4. "EdEddnEddy" Released: February 7, 2018

The Never Story is the debut studio album by American rapper JID. It was released on March 10, 2017, by Dreamville Records, Spillage Village and Interscope Records. The Never Story was supported by four official singles; "Never", "D/vision", "Hereditary", and "EdEddnEddy". The album received positive reviews from critics and debuted at number 197 on the US Billboard 200. J.I.D's lyrics details a narrative on his upbringing in East Atlanta.

== Background ==
On February 24, the first single "Never" was released. On March 6, the second single, "D/vision" was released, and the tracklist for the album was revealed. The album features guest appearances from EarthGang, 6lack, and Mereba, with production coming from J. Cole, Hollywood JB, Frank Dukes, Childish Major, Christo, Sean McVerry, Latrell James, OZ the Additive, Tha Officialz, SMKA, and The Imaginary Kids.

== Singles and promotion ==
On February 20, 2017, the same day of announcing the signing to Dreamville, the music video of the album's first single "Never" was released. On March 6, after revealing the tracklist, he also released "D/vision" as the second single, with the music video released on August 17. On September 27, the music video for "Hereditary" was released as the third single. On February 7, 2018, the album's fourth single, "EdEddnEddy", accompanied by an animated music video was released. J.I.D also toured the album on his "Never Had Shit" tour with EarthGang, Chaz French, and Lute.

== Critical reception ==
Professional ratings
Review scores
Source	Rating
AllMusic	4/5 stars
HipHopDX	3.9/5 stars
XXL	4/5

The Never Story received very positive reviews. Scott Glaysher of HipHopDX said "If there is one hypothesis that J.I.D wants you to walk away with after bumping The Never Story, it's the notion that he can rap well. We all know southern lyricists do in fact exist, but in today's mumble game, it's refreshing to have him remind us with 12 tracks of crafty lyrics and crisp beats." XXL said "J.I.D possesses the lyrical capability and knack for songwriting that could one day put him in a similar space as the 4 Your Eyez Only creator (J. Cole). Announcing his signing with Dreamville in February, the Spillage Village member wasted no time finding his footing, unleashing his The Never Story project just a month later, a collection of songs that validates the hype and makes for a glowing first impression of all that J.I.D has to offer." Reviewing the album for AllMusic, Paul Simpson claimed that "It's obvious that J.I.D isn't trying to emulate anyone else in the Atlanta rap scene. Instead of bass-heavy trap beats, his backing tracks are more organic-sounding and veer closer to smoky neo-soul, as he switches between swift rapping and romantic crooning."

=== Accolades ===
Publication	Rank	Ref.
Complex	46	
HipHopDX	18	
Rolling Stone	9	

== Track listing ==
No.	Title	Writer(s)	Producer(s)	Length
1.	"Doo Wop"	Destin Route; Sean McVerry	Sean McVerry	1:15
2.	"General"	Route; Latrell Boyd; Brandon Coleman	Latrell James; OZ the Additive	3:18
3.	"Never"	Route; John Welch; Marcus Randle	Christo; Childish Major	4:01
4.	"EdEddnEddy"	Route; Welch; Eugene McDuff; Justin Bryant	Hollywood JB	2:20
5.	"D/vision" (featuring EarthGang)	Route; Johnny B. Moore; Olu Fann; Eian Parker; Jermaine Cole	J. Cole; Johnny Venus^{[a]}	4:25
6.	"Hereditary"	Route; Welch; Randle; Bryant; Vincent Jenkins Jr.	Tha Officialz; Childish Major^{[a]}	4:03
7.	"All Bad" (featuring Mereba)	Route; Bryant; Mereba; Adam Feeney	Hollywood JB; Frank Dukes^{[b]}	4:51
8.	"Underwear"	Route; Welch	Christo	3:34
9.	"8701" (featuring 6lack)	Route; Randle; Ricardo Valentine	Childish Major	1:51
10.	"Hoodbooger"	Route; Blake German; Mike Ratledge	SMKA	2:36
11.	"Somebody"	Route; Welch; Bruce Swedien; Richard Boyell; Joel Georges	The Imaginary Kids; Christo^{[a]}	3:35
12.	"Lauder"	Route; Welch; Cole	J. Cole; Christo^{[a]}	4:02
Total length:				39:51

Notes

- ^{^[a]} signifies an additional producer.
- ^{^[b]} signifies an uncredited producer.
- "Never" and "Lauder" are stylized in capital letters.
- "EdEddnEddy" pays tribute to the Cartoon Network show of the same name, by drawing parallels between the show's trio and his adolescent friends.
- "8701" is a reference to fellow Atlanta artist Usher's third studio album, 8701.

Sample credits

- "Doo Wop" contains interpolations of "Every Nigger is a Star", written and performed by Boris Gardiner.
- "EdEddnEddy" contains a sample from "Oblighetto", as performed by Jack McDuff.
- "D/vision” contains a sample from “Mean Mistreater” performed by The Bar Kays.
- "Hoodbooger" contains elements from "Slightly All The Time", as performed by Soft Machine.
- "Somebody" contains elements from "Time", as performed by Ju-Par Universal Orchestra.
- "All Bad" contains elements from "Parts on Parts" performed by Frank Dukes.

== Personnel ==
Vocalists

- JID - primary artist
- EarthGang - featured artist (5)
- Mereba - featured artist (7)
- 6lack - featured artist (9)

Technical

- Juro "Mez" Davis - mixer

Production

- Childish Major – production (3, 6, 9)
- Christo – production (3, 8, 11, 12)
- Hollywood JB – production (4, 7)
- J. Cole – production (5, 12)
- Latrell James – production (2)
- OZ the Additive – production (2)
- Sean McVerry – production (1)
- SMKA – production (10)
- Tha Officialz – production (6)
- The Imaginary Kids – production (11)
- Fred Lozano – Art Direction

== Charts ==
Chart (2018)	Peak position
US Billboard 200	197
US Heatseeker Albums	14
