= Gold Mouf =

Studio album by Lute
- Released: October 4, 2021
- Recorded: 2019–2021
- Length: 43:23
- Label: Dreamville; Interscope
- Producer: J. Cole (exec.); Ibrahim Hamad (exec.); Big Pooh (exec.)

Lute chronology
West 1996 Pt. 2 (2017)	Gold Mouf (2021)

Singles from Gold Mouf
- 1. "GED (Gettin Every Dolla)" Released: February 4, 2020; 2. "Life" Released: July 6, 2020; 3. "Myself" Released: May 31, 2021

Gold Mouf is the second studio album by American rapper Lute. It was released on October 4, 2021, by Dreamville Records and Interscope Records. The album includes guest appearances from labelmates JID, Cozz, and Ari Lennox, in addition to Little Brother, Saba, Westside Boogie, BJ the Chicago Kid, Blakk Soul, and Devn. The album was executive produced by rapper and manager Big Pooh, and sequenced by rapper Phonte.

== Background ==
The title of the album, Gold Mouf, is the name of Lute's alter ego. He first unveiled the moniker on the song "Under the Sun". In an interview with XXL in 2019, Lute spoke on what he was working on saying:

I'm working on three different projects right now. I got some shit for the hip-hop niggas, some shit for niggas that wanna hear me on upbeat-type shit and then I got some shit that's completely left field that I just want to experiment with. I’m just trying to experiment with music because I don't want to be put in a box. I don't want to be just a hip-hop artist. Niggas know I can spit, but at the same time I want to make music that got replay value.

== Singles ==
On February 4, 2020, he released the single "GED (Gettin Every Dolla)", which he performed at the halftime show for the Charlotte Hornets on March 7, 2020. On July 6, 2020 he released the single "Life" along with a music video. On May 31, 2021, Lute released the third single, "Myself" featuring Devn. The music video was later released on August 16.

== Promotion ==
On March 23, 2020, Lute released a mini-series on YouTube titled Gold Mouf Chronicles. The series consists of six episodes directed and edited by Alexander Hall. On August 2, 2021, Lute released another series called Gold Mouf Monday's, where he revealed information about the album each Monday leading up to the release date.

== Track listing ==
No.	Title	Writer(s)	Producer(s)	Length
1.	"100"	Luther Nicholson; Chad Cook; Cooper McGill; Justin Zim; Wilton Moore	KingCeez; Coop The Truth; J-Smash	3:50
2.	"GED (Gettin Every Dolla)"	Nicholson; Mitchell Pennell; Patrick Hayes; Wilton Moore	J-Smash; mixMP; Patrick "Guitarboy" Hayes	2:34
3.	"Myself" (featuring Devn)	Nicholson; Devin Mitchell; Samuel Troxel	Trox	2:52
4.	"Be Okay"	Nicholson; Anthoine Walters; Diego Avendano; Juan Ha Kim; Samuel Ahana	Diego Ave; Swish	2:48
5.	"Eye to Eye" (featuring Cozz)	Nicholson; Cody Osagie; Eric Mercer Jr.; Richard Bartell; Wilton Moore	The Nukez	3:29
6.	"Changes" (featuring BJ the Chicago Kid)	Nicholson; Bryan Sledge; Deon Knight Jr; Derrell Jackson	Suburban Plaza	2:54
7.	"Ghetto Love" (featuring Ari Lennox and Blakk Soul)	Nicholson; Eric Mercer Jr.; Matthew Crabtree; Melvin Henderson	Blakk Soul; Mell; Matthew Crabtree	3:23
8.	"Amen" (featuring Little Brother)	Nicholson; Phonte Coleman; Thomas Jones; Rommel Donald	ROMderful	3:51
9.	"Birdsong" (featuring JID and Saba)	Nicholson; Destin Route; Tahj Chandler; John Welch	Christo	3:26
10.	"Flossin'" (featuring Westside Boogie)	Nicholson; Anthony Dixson; Eric Mercer Jr.; Marco Bruno	Marco Polo	3:49
11.	"Life"	Nicholson; Dominique Smith	Dominique "Dom?" Smith	3:13
12.	"Overnight"	Nicholson; Lorenzo Ferguson; Phonte Coleman; Richard Bartell; Wilton Moore	Zo!; Tigallo; J-Smash	3:23
13.	"Crashing"	Nicholson; David Charles Medina II; Kaleb Rollins; Ronald Gilmore	Ron Gilmore; K-Quick; Diamond	3:45
Total length:				43:23

Deluxe edition
No.	Title	Writer(s)	Producer(s)	Length
14.	"Outta Sight"	Nicholson; Kelvin Wooten; Mitchell Pennell; Wilton Moore	mixMP; Wu10; J. Smash of The Nukez; J. Cole; Thomas "Pooh" Jones; Mischa "Big Dho" Burgess	2:49
15.	"Finding Self"	Nicholson; Richard Bartell; Wilton Moore	The Nukez; J. Cole; Thomas "Pooh" Jones; Mischa "Big Dho" Burgess; Elite; DJ Pain; Dreamlife	3:32
16.	"Livin'"	Nicholson; Eric Mercer Jr.; Justin Bryant; Marvin Coady; Wilton Moore	Hollywood JB; Soul Professa; J. Smash of The Nukez; J. Cole; Thomas "Pooh" Jones; Mischa "Big Dho" Burgess	2:56
17.	"Like Wine"	Nicholson; Cedric Brown	Ced Breeze	2:35
18.	"Luther's Freestyle"	Nicholson; Richard Bartell; Wilton Moore	The Nukez; J. Cole; Thomas "Pooh" Jones; Mischa "Big Dho" Burgess	2:28
19.	"Run It Back"	Nicholson; Nelson Bridges; Richard Bartell; Wilton Moore	The Nukez; J. Cole; Thomas "Pooh" Jones; Mischa "Big Dho" Burgess	2:28
Total length:				60:14
