= Better (Deante' Hitchcock album) =

Studio album by Deante' Hitchcock
- Released: May 13, 2020
- Recorded: 2017–19
- Genre: Hip-hop
- Length: 39:16
- Label: ByStorm; RCA Records
- Producer: Mark Pitts (exec.); Brandon Phillips-Taylor

Deante' Hitchcock chronology
Just a Sample 2 (2019)	Better (2020)

Singles from Better
- 1. "How TF" Released: November 5, 2019; 2. "I Got Money Now" Released: April 15, 2020; 3. "Attitude" Released: May 20, 2020; 4. "Déjà Vu" / "Text Me" Released: October 21, 2020

Better (stylized in all caps) is the debut studio album by American rapper Deante' Hitchcock. It was released on May 13, 2020 through ByStorm and RCA Records, a division of Sony Music Entertainment. It includes features from JID, 6LACK, Young Nudy, Miguel, and St. Beauty. The deluxe edition was released on October 28, 2020, including 9 additional tracks with features from Reason, Guapdad 4000, Ro James, and Kenny Mason.

== Background ==
In 2017, Hitchcock signed with ByStorm and RCA Records, and announced the trilogy Good, Better, and Best, making this album the second project of the trilogy.

That was really the plan from the start, because it started off as Good, Better, Best. When I met my producer, Brandon Phillips-Taylor, we sat down and we put this whole thing together and he was like this could be a trilogy-type thing. Originally, Better was supposed to come out a lot sooner than it did, but I’m kind of glad that it spanned out this way. I want Best to be the last thing that I drop.

In 2019, Hitchcock was invited to the Revenge of the Dreamers III recording sessions, appearing on the song "PTSD". He later went on the Catch Me If You Can Tour with JID, when the majority of the album was recorded.

== Singles ==
On November 5, 2019, he released the single "How TF" featuring 6LACK, supported by a music video in March 2020. On April 15, 2020, he released the second single "I Got Money Now" featuring JID. On October 21, two singles for the deluxe edition of album were released: "Déjà Vu" and "Text Me".

== Critical reception ==
In a positive review of the album from Uproxx, Aaron Williams said Deante' Hitchcock is "somewhat of a bridge between the dusty funk of soulful Dungeon Family predecessors like Goodie Mob and Outkast and the brand of vibey-but-vapid trap of contemporaries who are off-shoots of the Future/Young Thug family tree. Equal parts T.I. and CeeLo or 21 Savage and JID, Hitchcock gracefully glides along on thundering 808s with spiritual insights and introspective wisdom that has as much appeal for fans of trap tales as it does for folks who love 'real hip-hop.'"

== Track listing ==
Credits adapted from Tidal.

Standard edition
No.	Title	Writer(s)	Producer(s)	Length
1.	"I Remember"	Deante' Van Hitchcock; Brandon Phillips-Taylor	Brandon Phillips-Taylor	4:15
2.	"I Got Money Now" (featuring JID)	Hitchcock; Brandon Phillips-Taylor; Richard Rudolph; Minnie Riperton; Charles Stepney; Destin Route	Brandon Phillips-Taylor	3:38
3.	"Attitude" (featuring Young Nudy)	Hitchcock; Dante Clay; Brandon Phillips-Taylor; Quantavious T. Thomas; Lawrence A. Edwards; Jamal D. Glaze; Donnell Prince; Darryl R. Richardson; Jonathan Smith	Brandon Phillips-Taylor	3:21
4.	"How TF" (featuring 6LACK)	Hitchcock; Brandon Phillips-Taylor; Ricardo Valentine	Brandon Phillips-Taylor	3:58
5.	"Flashbacks" (featuring Miguel and St. Beauty)	Hitchcock; Brandon Phillips-Taylor; David Fuller; Miguel Pimentel; Alexandria Rosemond	Brandon Phillips-Taylor	4:02
6.	"Gimmie Yo Money"	Hitchcock; Brandon Phillips-Taylor; Blair Hicks; Tate Farris; Aldrin Davis; Clifford Joseph Harris; Kawan Prather	Brandon Phillips-Taylor	2:33
7.	"Circles"	Hitchcock; Brandon Phillips-Taylor; Kwame Ahmed Buchanan Sr.; Sean Terrell Chavis; James Harnett III	Brandon Phillips-Taylor	3:07
8.	"Shadowman's Interlude"	Hitchcock; Dante Clay; Brandon Phillips-Taylor	Brandon Phillips-Taylor	3:10
9.	"Growing Up / Mother God"	Hitchcock; Brandon Phillips-Taylor	Brandon Phillips-Taylor	5:02
10.	"Angels" (contains bonus track "My Bitch")	Hitchcock; Brandon Phillips-Taylor	Brandon Phillips-Taylor	6:10
Total length:				39:16

Deluxe edition – Disc 1
No.	Title	Writer(s)	Producer(s)	Length
1.	"Demon"	Hitchcock; Brandon Phillips-Taylor	Brandon Phillips-Taylor	2:01
2.	"I Got Money Now" (featuring JID)	Hitchcock; Brandon Phillips-Taylor; Richard Rudolph; Minnie Riperton; Charles Stepney; Destin Route	Brandon Phillips-Taylor	3:38
3.	"Attitude" (featuring Young Nudy)	Hitchcock; Dante Clay; Brandon Phillips-Taylor; Quantavious T. Thomas; Lawrence A. Edwards; Jamal D. Glaze; Donnell Prince; Darryl R. Richardson; Jonathan Smith	Brandon Phillips-Taylor	3:21
4.	"Kenny G"	Hitchcock; Brandon Phillips-Taylor	Brandon Phillips-Taylor	2:16
5.	"My Bitch"	Hitchcock; Brandon Phillips-Taylor	Brandon Phillips-Taylor	2:35
6.	"Plug Me In"	Hitchcock; Brandon Phillips-Taylor	Brandon Phillips-Taylor	3:19
7.	"Text Me" (featuring Ro James)	Hitchcock; Brandon Phillips-Taylor; Ronnie James Tucker	Brandon Phillips-Taylor	3:05
8.	"Gimmie Yo Money"	Hitchcock; Brandon Phillips-Taylor; Blair Hicks; Tate Farris; Aldrin Davis; Clifford Joseph Harris; Kawan Prather	Brandon Phillips-Taylor	2:33
9.	"Circles"	Hitchcock; Brandon Phillips-Taylor; Kwame Ahmed Buchanan Sr.; Sean Terrell Chavis; James Harnett III	Brandon Phillips-Taylor	3:07
10.	"Shadowman's Interlude"	Hitchcock; Dante Clay; Brandon Phillips-Taylor	Brandon Phillips-Taylor	3:10

Deluxe edition – Disc 2
No.	Title	Writer(s)	Producer(s)	Length
1.	"I Remember"	Hitchcock; Brandon Phillips-Taylor	Brandon Phillips-Taylor	4:15
2.	"How Does It Feel" (featuring Kenny Mason)	Hitchcock; Brandon Phillips-Taylor; Edwin Green	Brandon Phillips-Taylor	3:44
3.	"Weighing Me Down" (featuring Reason)	Hitchcock; Dante Clay; Brandon Phillips-Taylor; Robert Gill, Jr.	Brandon Phillips-Taylor	4:34
4.	"How TF" (featuring 6LACK)	Hitchcock; Brandon Phillips-Taylor; Ricardo Valentine	Brandon Phillips-Taylor	3:58
5.	"Déjà Vu" (featuring Guapdad 4000)	Hitchcock; Brandon Phillips-Taylor; Akeem Hayes	Brandon Phillips-Taylor	3:48
6.	"Reflections"	Hitchcock; Brandon Phillips-Taylor	Brandon Phillips-Taylor	2:33
7.	"Flashbacks" (featuring Miguel and St. Beauty)	Hitchcock; Brandon Phillips-Taylor; David Fuller; Miguel Pimentel; Alexandria Rosemond	Brandon Phillips-Taylor	4:02
8.	"Growing Up / Mother God"	Hitchcock; Brandon Phillips-Taylor	Brandon Phillips-Taylor	5:02
9.	"Praylude" (featuring JaelSpeaks)	Hitchcock; Brandon Phillips-Taylor; JaelSpeaks	Brandon Phillips-Taylor	2:11
10.	"Angels"	Hitchcock; Brandon Phillips-Taylor	Brandon Phillips-Taylor	3:24

Notes

- "Attitude" and "Shadowman's Interlude" feature uncredited vocals from Dante Clay.
- "Gimmie Yo Money" features uncredited vocals from Yung Baby Tate.

Sample credits

- "I Got Money Now" contains a sample from "Les Fleur" performed by Minnie Riperton.
- "Gimmie Yo Money" contains a sample from "Do It (Stick It Baby)" performed by T.I.

== Personnel ==
Credits adapted from Tidal.

- Elton "L10mixedit" Chueng – mixing engineer
- Mike Bozzi – mastering engineer
- Brandon Phillips-Taylor – recording engineer
- Daniel Vargass – assistant engineer
- Robert Mandiogo – assistant engineer
