= Mary Oliver (disambiguation) =

Mary Oliver (1935–2019) was an American poet.

Mary Oliver may also refer to:

- Mary Oliver (violinist), American violinist
- Mary Beth Oliver, professor of media studies at Penn State University
- Mary Margaret Oliver, American politician and member of the Georgia House of Representatives

== See also ==
- Mary C. Wright (née Mary Oliver Clabaugh, 1917–1970), American sinologist and historian
- Mary Oliver: Saved by the Beauty of the World, a 2026 documentary film about the life and work of the poet Mary Oliver
