= WRK =

WRK, or wrk, may refer to:

- wrk, the ISO 639-3 code for the Garrwa language, spoken by the Garrwa people of the Northern Territory of Australia
- WRK, the National Rail code for Worksop railway station in Nottinghamshire, UK
- WRK, the NYSE code for WestRock, an American corrugated packaging company
- "WRK" (song), by JID

See also

- Work (disambiguation)
