= God Does Like Ugly =

2025 studio album by JID

Studio album by JID
- Released: August 8, 2025
- Genres: Southern hip-hop; trap
- Length: 57:18
- Labels: Dreamville; Interscope
- Producers: 206derek; Akil Pratt; Ambezza; Beatnick Dee; Benji; Bijan; Boi-1da; Buddy Ross; CameOne; Chase B; Childish Major; Christo; Coleman; Luke Crowder; Cubeatz; Eli Macedon; Frankie P; Gib DJ; Jay Card; Jay Versace; Lex Luger; Major Seven; Mario Luciano; Muzikman Sam; Nabeyin; Nice Rec; Nik D; Noah Scharf; Pluss; Gordon Ritchie-Haughton; Shroom; Stealthismetal; Thundercat; Tim Suby; Trakgirl; Trey Lander; TryBishop; Tu!; Vinylz; Yuli

JID chronology
GDLU (Preluxe) (2025)	God Does Like Ugly (2025)

Singles from God Does Like Ugly
- 1. "WRK" Released: April 18, 2025; 2. "On McAfee" Released: August 7, 2025; 3. "Of Blue" Released: August 7, 2025; 4. "No Boo" Released: August 7, 2025; 5. "Community" Released: August 7, 2025; 6. "Sk8" Released: September 16, 2025

God Does Like Ugly is the fourth studio album by the American rapper JID. It was released through Dreamville and Interscope on August 8, 2025. It follows his critically acclaimed 2022 album The Forever Story and features guest appearances by Westside Gunn, Clipse, Vince Staples, Ciara, EarthGang, Don Toliver, Ty Dolla Sign, 6lack, Jessie Reyez, Baby Kia, Mereba, and Pastor Troy. Notable producers that contributed to the album include Childish Major, Christo, Lex Luger, Pluss, Jay Versace, Buddy Ross, Chase B, Thundercat, Boi-1da, Cubeatz, and Vinylz.

The lead single "WRK" was released on April 18, 2025. An extended play (EP) of songs cut from the album, GDLU (Preluxe), was released on July 4, 2025.

God Does Like Ugly was nominated for Best Rap Album at the 68th Annual Grammy Awards.

== Background and recording ==
JID released his critically acclaimed third studio album, The Forever Story, in 2022. On April 15, 2025, while teasing the single "WRK" he stated:

"Starting this new journey coming off The Forever Story has been a very strange, productive, yet tedious process. [...] I live my life by the saying "you can only control what you can control," so this is the first step into a new world that I control. And. It's. Fucking. UGLY"

He got the idea for the album title from his grandmother, who passed away in 2019. Before her death, they were talking about world events and his grandmother said, "God does like ugly, letting all this [happen]." and recommended that he name his album after what she said. He began working on the album in 2020.

== Composition ==
=== Overview ===
The album is primarily a southern hip-hop and trap album. Paste compared JID's rapping style to that of OutKast, with his quick, energetic, and smooth lines that frequently change flow.

=== Songs ===
On "Glory", JID raps about the Bible Belt and the effects of Christian tradition in the Black south, telling the story of his older brother in prison. The song is the only fully clean track on the album and incorporates vocals from a choir from Memphis, Tennessee, who prayed over JID after they cleared their sample. JID ventures into Miami bass on "Sk8", featuring Ciara and EarthGang. On "No Boo", with Jessie Reyez, he raps quickly in Spanish. "On McAfee" contains a "fiery chorus" from Baby Kia, and "Of Blue" is a song divided into three phases. The penultimate song, "K-Word" contains strings similar to work by Hans Zimmer and contains dense lyrics about karma. The closing track, "For Keeps", has JID reveal that he is a father.

== Release and promotion ==
JID performed at the Dreamville Festival on April 6, 2025, and previewed the song "WRK" during his set. After his show, he shared a pre-save link to the song, which was later released on April 18 as the lead single for God Does Like Ugly. The song was his first solo track since The Forever Story.

On May 8, JID released a trailer for the album and announced the release date of August 8. He also revealed that the album would have 15 tracks. A press release described the trailer as depicting "scenes from a lost world, borrowing inspiration from films like The Warriors and Mad Max but as always with J.I.D, set upon the backdrop of Atlanta." On July 20, JID told his fans to go to Washington Square Park in New York City, where he announced five "Dollar & A Dream" concerts in various cities and revealed the full album cover. The tracklist was revealed on August 5, with JID later announcing that the song "Sun" would be added to the album on the 11th, after the album's release. JID performed "Glory" on The Late Show with Stephen Colbert in October 2025.

JID is scheduled to embark on the "God Does Like World Tours" tour in support of the album, with support from Young Nudy, Mick Jenkins, Jordan Ward, Baby Kia, Swavay, Marco Plus, DC the Don, Niko Brim, and Kai Cash.

In an August 2025 interview, JID revealed that he conceived of God Does Like Ugly as "a part one," and that the "part two...God Doesn't Like Ugly," will potentially be the long-awaited collaborative album between himself and fellow rapper Metro Boomin.

== Critical reception ==
Professional ratings
Aggregate scores
Source	Rating
Metacritic	73/100
Review scores
Source	Rating
And It Don't Stop	(3-star Honorable Mention)
AllMusic	3.5/5 stars
Beats Per Minute	75/100
Consequence	B+
The Line of Best Fit	8/10
Paste	6.7/10
Rolling Stone	3.5/5 stars
Slant Magazine	2/5 stars

At Metacritic, which assigns a normalized rating out of 100 to reviews from mainstream publications, God Does Like Ugly received a weighted average score of 73 from 7 reviews, indicating "generally favorable reviews". Mary Chiney of Beats Per Minute rated the album 75/100 and Kiana Fitzgerald of Consequence gave it a B+. Benny Sun of Paste rated the album a 6.7/10, noting that it is a decline in quality following the promise from The Forever Story. Writing for Rolling Stone, Mankaprr Conteh gave the album 3.5 out of 5 stars, saying that despite the overall narrative, the album's sound is less smooth and unified than JID's previous effort. He also said that some of JID's rapping on songs such as "What We On" and "WRK" felt wordy. Paul Attard of Slant Magazine rated the album 2 out of 5 stars, saying that JID gets lost in his own ambition in trying to match the reception of his last project, ending up in a cluttered mess.

=== Accolades ===
Publication	Accolade	Rank	Ref.
Complex	The 50 Best Albums of 2025	7	
Consequence	The 50 Best Albums of 2025	16	
HotNewHipHop	The 40 Best Rap Albums of 2025	23	

== Track listing ==
No.	Title	Writer(s)	Producer(s)	Length
1.	"YouUgly" (with Westside Gunn)	Destin Route; Alvin Worthy; Neal Pogue II; TIm Schoegje; John Welch; Markus Randle; Luke Crowder; Rodney Pratt	Tu!; Shroom; Christo; Childish Major; Crowder; Akil Pratt	4:43
2.	"Glory"	Route; Nicholas Doherty; Lexus Lewis	Beatnick Dee; Lex Luger	3:59
3.	"WRK"	Route; J. Welch; Asheton Hogan	Christo; Pluss	3:14
4.	"Community" (with Clipse)	Route; Terrence Thornton; Gene Thornton; Frank Parra; Mario Dragoi	Frankie P; Mario Luciano	4:25
5.	"Gz"	Route; J. Welch; Shakari Linder	Christo; Trakgirl	3:28
6.	"VCRs" (with Vince Staples)	Route; Vincent Staples; Jahlil Gunter	Jay Versace	3:58
7.	"Sk8" (with Ciara and EarthGang)	Route; Ciara Harris; Eian Parker; Olu Fann; J. Welch; Jackson Card; Peter Mudge	Christo; Jay Card; Nice Rec	3:10
8.	"What We On" (with Don Toliver)	Route; Caleb Toliver; Derek Anderson; Mathias Liyew; Chase Benjamin; Nik Frascona; Michael Cerda; Edgar Panford; Josiah Sherman	206derek; Ambezza; Chase B; Nik D; CameOne; Nabeyin; Buddy Ross; Bijan	3:58
9.	"Wholeheartedly" (with 6lack and Ty Dolla Sign)	Route; Ricardo Valentine Jr.; Tyrone Griffin Jr.; J. Welch; Margaux Whitney; Ian Welch	Christo; Benji; Yuli	3:45
10.	"No Boo" (with Jessie Reyez)	Route; Jessica Reyez; Timothy Suby	Tim Suby	3:35
11.	"And We Vibing" (interlude)	Route; Gordon Ritchie-Haughton; Stephen Bruner	Ritchie-Haughton; Thundercat	0:41
12.	"On McAfee" (with Baby Kia)	Route; Khari Hoard; Matthew Samuels; Scott Coleman; Kevin Gomringer; Tim Gomringer; Anderson Hernandez	Boi-1da; Coleman; Cubeatz; Vinylz	2:50
13.	"Of Blue" (with Mereba)	Route; Mariam Mereba; J. Welch; Randle; Elijah Forbes; Gibson Alcott; Donald Lander III; Jeremy Hicks	Christo; Mereba; Childish Major; Eli Macedon; Gib DJ; Trey Lander; Trybishop; Noah Scharf	6:36
14.	"K-Word" (with Pastor Troy)	Route; Micah Troy; J. Welch; Omar Walker; Samuel Williams	Christo; Major Seven; Muzikman Sam	5:11
15.	"For Keeps"	Route; Pogue; Robert Cannady	Tu!; Stealthismetal	3:45
Total length:				57:18

God Does Like Ugly (Digital Alternate Version) track listing
No.	Title	Writer(s)	Producer(s)	Length
16.	"Sun" (with Anycia)	Route; Anycia Edwards	Christo; Childish Major; jetsonmade; EJ Stellar	3:54
Total length:				61:12

=== Notes ===
- Clipse members Pusha T and Malice are individually credited on "Community" along with the duo on some streaming services.
- "K-Word" features uncredited vocals by Jessie Reyez.
- "Sun" features uncredited vocals by J. Cole.
- A "Preluxe" version was released on August 9, with the tracks from GDLU (Preluxe) added, for a total of 74:28.

== Personnel ==
Credits adapted from Tidal and Apple Music.

- Najinga "Jean" Luster – background vocals (tracks 1 and 9)
- Rashida "Sheed" Chitunda – background vocals (tracks 1 and 9)
- Jabrielle Williams – bass, guitar (track 4)
- Trakgirl – background vocals, keyboard, drum programming (track 5)
- Cairo – drum programming (track 5)
- Ian Welch – background vocals, bass (track 9)
- Margaux Whitney – violin (track 9)
- Timothy Suby – bass, keyboard, drum programming (track 10)
- Gordon Ritchie-Haughton – background vocals (track 11)
- Stephen "Thundercat" Bruner – background vocals (track 11)
- Noah Scharf – background vocals, drum kit (track 13)
- Trey Lander – bass (track 13)
- Gibson Alcott – drum kit, piano (track 13)
- Eli Macedon – guitar (track 13)
- Jeremy "Trybishop" Hicks – keyboard, piano (track 13)
- John Kadadu – recording
- Mario Dragoi – recording (track 4)
- Juro Mez Davis – recording (track 9)
- Leslie Brathwaite – mixing (all tracks except track 8)
- E. Dan – mixing (track 8)
- Chris Athens – mastering
- Brad Smalling – immersive mixing, immersive mastering

== Charts ==
Chart performance for God Does Like Ugly
Chart (2025)	Peak position
Australian Albums (ARIA)	42
Australian Hip Hop/R&B Albums (ARIA)	7
Belgian Albums (Ultratop Flanders)	90
Canadian Albums (Billboard)	29
Dutch Albums (Album Top 100)	53
Irish Albums (IRMA)	73
New Zealand Albums (RMNZ)	12
Portuguese Albums (AFP)	33
Swiss Albums (Schweizer Hitparade)	33
UK Albums (Official Charts)	69
UK R&B Albums (Official Charts)	3
US Billboard 200	11
US Top R&B/Hip-Hop Albums (Billboard)	4

== GDLU (Preluxe) ==
GDLU (Preluxe)

EP by JID
- Released: July 4, 2025
- Genres: Southern hip-hop; trap
- Length: 16:57
- Labels: Dreamville; Interscope
- Producers: Anca Trio Plus One; Christo; Eest.id; Eminem; Little Island; Reggie Gordon; Tu!

JID chronology
The Forever Story (2022)	GDLU (Preluxe) (2025)	God Does Like Ugly (2025)

Singles from GDLU (Preluxe)
- 1. "Animals (Pt. I)" Released: July 7, 2025

To help promote the album, a promotional EP, GDLU (Preluxe), was released on July 4, 2025. "Preluxe" is a portmanteau of "prelude" and "deluxe"; the EP contains songs that were cut from God Does Like Ugly. It features guest appearances by Lil Yachty, 6lack, and Eminem.

=== Background and release ===
JID announced GDLU (Preluxe) on July 1, 2025, at the end of the music video for his song "32 (Freestyle)", in which he rapped over the instrumental of "HBA" by Playboi Carti. On July 3, he released the song "Beau", which continued to promote the EP, although it did not appear on the actual project. On August 9, all songs from the EP were appended onto God Does Like Ugly on a release dubbed the Preluxe Edition.

=== Composition ===
The EP consists of four songs, lasting nearly 17 minutes long. It contains features from Lil Yachty, 6lack, and Eminem. The final track "Animals (Pt. I)", featuring Eminem (in his second collaboration with JID, after "Fuel"), contains two nearly-three-minute long technical verses from each of the rappers. Eminem gained attention in the song for his line "With these magazines, I act out like Ye and his cousin," referencing Kanye West's song "Cousins", where West confessed to an incestuous relationship he had with his cousin when they were both children. "Animals (Pt. I)" was released as a standalone single on July 7.

=== Track listing ===
GDLU (Preluxe) track listing
No.	Title	Writer(s)	Producer(s)	Length
1.	"Behold"	Destin Route; John Welch; Neal Pogue II; Reginald Gordon	Tu!; Christo; Reggie Gordon	2:35
2.	"Knew Better" (with Lil Yachty)	Route; Welch; Miles McCollum	Christo	4:27
3.	"Lisa" (with 6lack)	Route; Jason Idehen; Randy Steirling; Ricardo Valentine Jr.	Little Island	4:06
4.	"Animals (Pt. I)" (with Eminem)	Route; Dirk Ruus; Greg Sekeres; Welch; Luis Resto; Marshall Mathers	Christo; Anca Trio Plus One; Eest.id; Eminem; Resto^{[a]}	5:48
Total length:				16:57

==== Notes ====
- ^{^[a]} indicates an additional producer.

=== Personnel ===
Credits adapted from Tidal.

- Reggie Gordon – background vocals, guitar, keyboard (track 1)
- Anca Trio Plus One – bass, keyboard, strings (track 4)
- Luis Resto – additional keyboard (track 4)
- Fredwreck – drum programming (track 4)
- John Kadadu – recording (all tracks)
- Mike Strange – recording, mixing (track 4)
- Tony Campana – recording (track 4)
- E. Dan – mixing (all tracks)
- Chris Athens – mastering (tracks 1–3)
- Brian "Big Bass" Gardner – mastering (track 4)
