= Stick (JID and J. Cole song) =

2022 song by Dreamville, JID, and J. Cole featuring Kenny Mason and Sheck Wes

Song by Dreamville, JID, and J. Cole featuring Kenny Mason and Sheck Wes

from the album D-Day: A Gangsta Grillz Mixtape
- Released: March 31, 2022
- Genre: Hardcore hip hop; trap metal
- Length: 5:09
- Label: Dreamville; Interscope
- Songwriters: Destin Route; Edwin Green, Jr.; John Welch; Abraham Orellana; Eliot Dubock; Anthony Tucker
- Producers: Christo; AraabMuzik; Beat Butcha

"Stick" is a song released by the record label Dreamville, performed by American rappers JID and J. Cole featuring fellow American rappers Kenny Mason and Sheck Wes. It was released on March 31, 2022, as the first track on the label's compilation album, D-Day: A Gangsta Grillz Mixtape.

== Composition ==
In the song, the five rappers each talk about the need to have a "stick" (slang for a gun) on them at all times in order to protect them from any enemies they may encounter. Horn and gunshots sound effects are spread throughout the song.

== Music video ==
Cover for the music video

The official music video for the song was uploaded to YouTube on July 21, 2022. It was directed by Waboosh and Onda. It begins with JID on top of a mountain at night, motioning with a gun while DJ Drama narrates the intro to the album. JID and Kenny Mason then rap on a speedboat with Sheck Wes later standing in front of a militia and helping them gather weapons and get ready for an incoming war. J. Cole comes in last, standing in a room surrounded by special effects such as heat-seeking weapons and green lasers.

Marc Griffin of the magazine Vibe described the video as "chaotic" and "unhinged".

== Critical reception ==
Consequence named "Stick" as their rap song of the week.

== Commercial performance ==
"Stick" debuted at 71 on the Billboard Hot 100 for the chart week ending April 16, 2022. It marked Kenny Mason's first entry on the chart.

== Charts ==
Chart performance for "Stick"
Chart (2022)	Peak position
Canada Hot 100 (Billboard)	81
New Zealand Hot Singles (RMNZ)	22
Global 200 (Billboard)	160
US Billboard Hot 100	71
US Hot R&B/Hip-Hop Songs (Billboard)	20
US Hot Rap Songs (Billboard)	16
