= Bodies (Offset and JID song) =

2025 single by Offset and JID

Single by Offset and JID

from the album Kiari
- Released: June 20, 2025
- Recorded: August 8, 2024
- Genre: Hip-hop
- Length: 2:58
- Label: Motown
- Songwriters: Kiari Cephus; Destin Route; Anderson Hernandez; Michael Mulé; Isaac De Boni; Cashmere Brown; Jahmal Gwin; Michael Luce; Christian Pierce; David Williams; Stevie Benton
- Producers: Vinylz; FnZ; Brown; BoogzDaBeast

Offset singles chronology
"Ten" (2025)	"Bodies" (2025)

JID singles chronology
"WRK" (2025)	"Bodies" (2025)

Music video
- "Bodies" on YouTube

"Bodies" is a song by American rappers Offset and JID, released on June 20, 2025, as the lead single from the former's third studio album, Kiari. Produced by Vinylz, FnZ, Cashmere Brown and BoogzDaBeast, it samples "Bodies" by Drowning Pool and "Ringing Them Bells" by The Spirituals.

== Background ==
Offset said in a press statement:

"Bodies" is one of them ones I had to really take my time with. It's about standing on who you are, coming out the mud, and being confident in the face of adversity. I'm always evolving, and I don't fit in a box as an artist. I've been cooking this up for a minute and I'm just getting started. JID is my guy and had the perfect energy to match "Bodies." Stay tuned because we going up.

== Composition ==
The song contains "murky, atmospheric production" that is composed of ominous piano and propulsive drums. The chorus loops the whispered intro of Drowning Pool's "Bodies", "Let the bodies hit the floor". In addition, the song also prominently samples a rendition of the gospel song "Ringing Them Bells" by the choir The Spirituals, as backing choral vocals. Lyrically, the rappers explore the challenges in their lives, including trauma, grief and survival, and how such events impact others as well. Offset reflects on his rough upbringing and deaths of friends, with expressions of regret, and also raps about his wealth, ambition, and destiny. JID raps in an agile flow, with lyrics centering on grief, unpredictability of loyalty and chaos accompanying these troubles.

== Critical reception ==
The song received generally positive reviews. Bryson "Boom" Paul of HotNewHipHop wrote "Offset and J.I.D. resist spectacle in favor of substance. They tell the truth without spectacle, giving voice to wounds often ignored. In 'Bodies,' they craft a track that feels urgent, reflective, and necessary." Derrick Rossignol of Uproxx commented the sample "works well in this hip-hop mode removed from its original nu-metal context." Armon Sadler of Vibe described the song as an "earth-shattering lyrical clinic", remarking that "The Atlanta rapper brought his hard-nosed, aggressive flow, which matches the 808s and drums, and fellow ATLien JID dropped one of his best guest verses ever. There are often complaints about how sampling is executed, but Set and JID do such a good job making this song their own that it's completely inoffensive to just loop the Drowning Pool bars as the hook."

HotNewHipHop ranked the song as the 22nd best rap song of 2025.

== Music video ==
The music video was released alongside the single. Directed by Offset and filmed in Los Angeles, it opens with a dark and stormy scene. In a desert setting, Offset leads a group of runway models in front of a "glowing choir". Later, the grim reaper looms behind JID during his appearance and Offset is crowned at a ceremony as he is seated on a throne.

== Charts ==
=== Weekly charts ===
Weekly chart performance for "Bodies"
Chart (2025)	Peak position
Canada Hot 100 (Billboard)	99
New Zealand Hot Singles (RMNZ)	16
South Africa Streaming (TOSAC)	66
US Billboard Hot 100	72
US Hot R&B/Hip-Hop Songs (Billboard)	18

=== Year-end charts ===
Year-end chart performance for "Bodies"
Chart (2025)	Position
US Hot R&B/Hip-Hop Songs (Billboard)	91
