= West 1996 Pt. 2 =

West1996 pt. 2

Studio album by Lute
- Released: September 29, 2017
- Studios: The Dojo, Charlotte; The Sheltuh, Raleigh
- Length: 34:48
- Labels: Dreamville; Interscope
- Producers: J. Cole (exec.); Ibrahim Hamad (exec.); Cam O'bi; Dale P; Elite; J Dilla; Save Allen; Sean McVerry; Shiggy

Lute chronology
West1996 (2012)	West1996 pt. 2 (2017)	Gold Mouf (2021)

West1996 pt. 2 is the debut studio album by American rapper Lute. It was released on September 29, 2017, by Dreamville Records and Interscope Records. The album serves as the follow-up to his first solo mixtape, West1996 (2012). The album features guest appearances from fellow Dreamville duo EarthGang, Cam O'bi, Elevator Jay, GQ Slaughter, and High I'm Ry.

== Background ==
Lute originally intended to release the project as a free mixtape in 2014, but he said that he got a call from rapper J. Cole around 2 AM on the day it was supposed to be released. Cole asked Lute not to release the project yet and to hold on to it for him, that he wanted to help him get the project into the right hands. Lute eventually signed to Cole's Dreamville imprint in 2015. The album experienced several push backs over the years due to sample clearances and other issues.

Lute spoke on the album within his Still Slummin' documentary, he said:

My album is a accumulation of chapters and events leading up to Dreamville signing me. It’s a window into the last five years of my life…the obstacles, the challenges, the changes. It’s also motivation to not let people or circumstances define who you are. My only competition is the person I was yesterday. I've been patient and very appreciative of this platform and now its time to show what I'm capable of.

In a November 2021 interview with Bootleg Kev, Lute admitted that he does not consider this project as his debut album. Since he created and had the intentions of releasing the project as a mixtape, that is how he still perceives it. In the same interview, he mentioned that because this is his first project released under a major label, he understands why people consider it his "debut album". However, he considers his next project Gold Mouf as his debut album.

== Promotion and singles ==
On December 8, 2015, Lute's "Still Slummin'" appeared on Dreamville compilation album Revenge of the Dreamers II. The music video for "Still Slummin'" was released on October 17, 2017. On August 25, 2017, Lute released "Juggin'" as the second single, accompanied by a music video on August 28, 2017. On September 21, 2017, Lute revealed the release date of the album on Instagram, and released a mini documentary entitled, Lute: Still Slummin'.

On September 26, 2017, "Premonition" featuring EarthGang and Cam O'bi was released. The music video for "Morning Shift" was uploaded on Vevo soon after the album's release.

== Track listing ==
West1996 pt. 2

No.	Title	Writer(s)	Producer(s)	Length
1.	"Morning Shift"	Luther Nicholson; Mischa Burgess; Savion Allen	Save Allen	2:25
2.	"Still Slummin'"	Nicholson; J. Yancey; G. Tommaso	J Dilla	3:28
3.	"Home" (featuring Elevator Jay)	Nicholson; D. Scicchitano; J. Blackmon III; H. Suzuki	Shiggy	4:03
4.	"Ambitions"	Nicholson; Anthony Parrino; G. Barrow; B. Gibbons; A. Utley	Elite; Sean McVerry	1:25
5.	"Git Up" (featuring GQ Slaughter)	Nicholson; D. Scicchitano; A. Benjamin; P. Brown; T. Burton; C. Gipp; R. Murray; A. Patton; R. Wade; J. Bertami	Shiggy	4:01
6.	"Juggin"	Nicholson; Allen	Save Allen	3:43
7.	"Ford's Prayer" (featuring Cam O'bi)	Nicholson; C. Osteen	Cam O'bi	4:20
8.	"Crabs in a Barrel"	Nicholson; Allen	Save Allen	1:50
9.	"Premonition" (featuring EarthGang & Cam O'bi)	Nicholson; Osteen	Cam O'bi	3:58
10.	"Birds & Bees"	Nicholson; D. Poirier; K. Gamble; L. Huff C.; Gilbert	Dale P	1:42
11.	"Livin Life" (featuring High I'm Ry)	Nicholson; Allen; R. Douglass; Mischa Burgess; Vernon Duke	Save Allen	3:48
Total length:				34:48

Notes

- "Still Slummin'" features uncredited vocals by J. Cole.
