= D-Day: A Gangsta Grillz Mixtape =

Mixtape by Dreamville
- Released: March 31, 2022
- Length: 47:18
- Labels: Dreamville; Interscope
- Producers: DJ Drama; AraabMuzik; Beat Butcha; Ced Breeze; Christo; Chuck Inglish; Daoud; DZL; FaxOnly; Frank Dukes; Illmind; J. White Did It; Jake One; Jean Bleu; Leon Thomas III; Natra Average; Quay Global; Simon Gebrelul; Superstar O; Tane Runo; Tre Beats; Wu10; Wyldfyer

Dreamville chronology
Revenge of the Dreamers III (2019)	D-Day: A Gangsta Grillz Mixtape (2022)	Creed III: The Soundtrack (2023)

Singles from D-Day: A Gangsta Grillz Mixtape
- 1. "Heaven's EP" Released: September 21, 2021

D-Day: A Gangsta Grillz Mixtape is the fourth compilation album by American record label Dreamville. It was released on March 31, 2022, by Dreamville and Interscope as a Gangsta Grillz mixtape hosted by DJ Drama.

D-Day includes contributions from Dreamville artists, J. Cole, Bas, Cozz, Omen, Lute, Ari Lennox, JID, and EarthGang. The mixtape features guest appearances from 2 Chainz, ASAP Ferg, Kenny Mason, Sheck Wes, G Perico, Reason, and Young Nudy.

== Background ==
The mixtape is the fourth compilation by Dreamville, following Revenge of the Dreamers III (2019). It is also the second Dreamville release to be hosted by DJ Drama, following JID's album DiCaprio 2 (2018).

== Recording and production ==
Ibrahim Hamad revealed that the idea of this compilation album came from Barry Hefner in nine days, and was turned in and cleared by Interscope the day before it released. "Jozi Flows" was first recorded in 2019 during the Revenge of the Dreamers III sessions in Atlanta, and was finished in 2022 in Johannesburg and named after the city.

== Singles and promotion ==
On September 21, 2021, J. Cole released a freestyle titled "Heaven's EP", remixing the beat of "Pipe Down" from Drake's Certified Lover Boy.

On September 27, the label announced the second annual Dreamville Festival in Raleigh, North Carolina. The festival took place from April 2-3, including performances from all of Dreamville's artists as well as DJ Drama, Lil Wayne, Jeezy, T.I., Lil Baby, T-Pain, WizKid, Ja Rule, Ashanti, Kehlani, Moneybagg Yo, Wiz Khalifa, Wale, Morray, Fivio Foreign, Blxst, among others.

On March 30, 2022, the mixtape was announced via social media, to be released ahead of the Dreamville Festival.

== Critical reception ==
Writing for Vibe, Preezy Brown said the mixtape "captures Dreamville in the midst of their free-wheeling flow of creativity, which has accounted for some of the best compilations from a label or collective in recent memory. While not as explosive as previous offerings like Revenge of the Dreamers III, D-Day is a quality mix of selections that may not place Cole and company on the Gangsta Grillz Mt. Rushmore but is indicative of their stature as one of the most formidable, self-contained crews in music today."

== Track listing ==
D-Day: A Gangsta Grillz Mixtape track listing
No.	Title	Writer(s)	Producer(s)	Length
1.	"Stick" (with JID and J. Cole featuring Kenny Mason and Sheck Wes)	Destin Route; Jermaine Cole; Kenny Mason; John Welch; Abraham Orellana; Eliot Dubock; Anthony Tucker	Christo; AraabMuzik; Beat Butcha	5:09
2.	"Ghetto Gods Freestyle" (with EarthGang featuring 2 Chainz)	Olu Fann; Eian Parker; Tauheed Epps; Christopher Gibbs; Taji Ausar	Natra Average; Tane Runo	2:53
3.	"Lifestyle" (with Bas featuring ASAP Ferg)	Abbas Hamad; Darold Ferguson, Jr.; Cole	J. Cole	2:46
4.	"Starting 5" (with Lute, Cozz, and Omen)	Luther Nicholson; Cody Osagie; Damon Coleman; Wyatt Coleman; Norman Gimbel; Michel Legrand; Jacques Demy	Wyldfyer	4:30
5.	"Coming Down" (with Ari Lennox)	Courtney Salter; Michael Holmes; Cole; Kelvin Wooten	DZL; J. Cole; Wu10	2:36
6.	"Hair Salon" (with Cozz featuring G Perico and Reason)	Osagie; Jeremy Nash; Robert Gill, Jr.; Evan Ingersoll	Chuck Inglish	3:13
7.	"Freedom of Speech" (with J. Cole)	Cole; Daoud Anthony; Jacob Dutton	Daoud; Jake One	2:11
8.	"Blackberry Sap" (with Ari Lennox)	Salter; Anthony White; Akil King; Bianca Atterberry; Etterlene Jordan; Robert DeBarge; Anthony Jones	J. White Did It	2:29
9.	"Like Wine" (with Lute)	Nicholson; Cedric Brown	Ced Breeze	2:35
10.	"Jozi Flows" (with Bas and EarthGang)	Hamad; Fann; Holmes	DZL	2:55
11.	"Barry from Simpson" (with JID featuring 2 Chainz and Young Nudy)	Route; Epps; Quantavious Thomas; Christopher Rosser; Dameon Hughes; Garrett Wilson Adams II	Quay Global; Superstar O; Tre Beats	3:17
12.	"Everybody Ain't Shit" (with EarthGang)	Fann; Parker; Gibbs	Natra Average	3:23
13.	"Ballin in Newport" (with Omen)	D. Coleman; W. Coleman	Frank Dukes; Illmind	3:32
14.	"Big Trouble Freestyle" (with Cozz)	Osagie; Christopher Wallace; Nashiem Myrick; Sean Combs; Herb Magidson; Allie Wrubel		2:43
15.	"Heaven's EP" (with J. Cole)	Cole; Aubrey Graham; Leon Thomas III; Robert Fairfax III; Abdelhady Hafez; Anthonie Walters; Lazaro Camejo; Derek Kastal; Simon Gebrelul	Thomas; FaxOnly; Jean Bleu; Walters	2:58
Total length:				47:18

Sample credits

- "Coming Down" contains a sample of "I'm Going Down" as performed by Rose Royce.
- "Blackberry Sap" contains a sample of "Love Over and Over Again" as performed by Switch.
- "Big Trouble Freestyle" contains a sample of "Who Shot Ya?" as performed by The Notorious B.I.G.
- "Heaven's EP" contains a sample of "Pipe Down" as performed by Drake.

== Charts ==
Chart performance for D-Day: A Gangsta Grillz Mixtape
Chart (2022)	Peak position
Belgian Albums (Ultratop Flanders)	182
Canadian Albums (Billboard)	27
New Zealand Albums (RMNZ)	36
UK Albums (Official Charts)	94
US Billboard 200	11
