= Mary Beth Oliver =

- Education: University of Wisconsin-Madison
- Awards: Fellow of the International Communication Association since 2014, Fulbright Scholar in 2006
- Scientific career
- Fields: Media studies, media psychology
- Workplaces: Penn State College of Communications
- Thesis: Adolescents' Enjoyment of Graphic Horror: Effects of Viewers' Attitudes and Portrayals of Victim (1991)

Mary Beth Oliver is a Distinguished Professor of Media Studies at the Penn State College of Communications, where she is also the co-director of the Media Effects Research Laboratory]

== Education and career ==
Oliver received her B.A. from Virginia Tech in communication studies in 1986. She then attended the University of Wisconsin-Madison, where she received her M.A. and Ph.D. in 1988 and 1991, respectively. Both of her graduate degrees were in communication arts.

== Career ==
From 1991 to 1998, Oliver taught at Virginia Tech, before leaving her position as an associate professor there in 1998 to become an associate professor at the Penn State College of Communications. In 2004, she became a full professor at the Penn State College of Communications, where she became a distinguished professor in 2010. She has been the co-director of the Media Effects Research Laboratory since 2002. In the spring of 2013, she served as a visiting professor at the University of Mannheim in Mannheim, Germany.

== Research ==
Oliver's research focuses on multiple subjects in the field of media psychology, including the relationship between media and social cognition, and that between media and emotion. She has published studies about stereotyping in the media, positive media psychology, and other topics, and she is a supporter of the positive psychology movement. For example, she has researched the emotional responses people have to watching sad movies, and has noted that society expects men not to cry in such situations. She has also argued that seeing sad movies may help people feel better if they see them with a close friend, regardless of the movie itself.

== Honors and awards ==
Oliver has been a fellow of the International Communication Association since 2014, and was a Fulbright Scholar in 2006.
