= Under the Sun (Dreamville, J. Cole and Lute song) =

Song by Dreamville, J. Cole and Lute featuring DaBaby

from the album Revenge of the Dreamers III
- Released: July 5, 2019
- Recorded: January 2019
- Studio: Tree Sound Studios, Atlanta, Georgia
- Genre: Trap
- Length: 3:21
- Label: Dreamville; Interscope
- Songwriters: Jermaine Cole; Luther Nicholson; Jonathan Kirk; John Welch; Asheton Hogan; Peter Mudge
- Producers: Christo; Pluss; Nice Rec

"Under the Sun" is a song released by record label Dreamville Records, performed by American rappers J. Cole and Lute featuring fellow American rapper DaBaby. It also has extra vocals from fellow American rapper Kendrick Lamar, who performs the short two-lined chorus of the song. The song was released as the first track on the label's album, Revenge of the Dreamers III. DaBaby received praise for his guest verse, with Billboard, Complex, and HotNewHipHop all ranking it as his best feature of 2019.

== Background ==
In February, Dreamville gave a live preview of the song after the NBA All-Star game – which J. Cole was the halftime show performer, during the free concert in Charlotte. On Twitter, Hamad explained that Kendrick Lamar originally did not intend to appear on the track, and was at first just supposed to come and listen.

== Recording and production ==
The song was produced by Christo, Pluss and Nice Rec, and contains an uncredited sample from "I'll Be Waiting For You" by Argo Singers. Christo spoke about the composition of the song with Billboard, saying:

I didn't see DaBaby at the studio. If he was there, I didn't see it. The integral part of the song is the sample that repeats. I heard that in a room with [co-producer] Pluss, and I knew he could put some dope Southern drums on and make it a good song. Out of nowhere, we got Cole and Lute, and then DaBaby hopped on. I heard the finished version when things were being mixed. With me being on tour with J.I.D, I wasn't really [actively] listening to tracks.

== Chart performance ==
The song debuted at number 44 on the Billboard Hot 100 and number 10 on the Rolling Stone Top 100, becoming the label's highest-charting song on both charts. On May 14, 2020, the song was certified platinum by the Recording Industry Association of America (RIAA) for sales of over a million digital units in the United States.

== Music video ==
The music video for the song was released on September 16, 2019, on the official Dreamville YouTube channel and has 76 million views as of April 2025. It was directed by Scott Lazer, Aisultan Seitov, David Peters, and Chad Tennies, and produced by Tripp Kramer.

== Charts ==
Chart (2019)	Peak position
Canada Hot 100 (Billboard)	72
US Billboard Hot 100	44
US Hot R&B/Hip-Hop Songs (Billboard)	11
US Rolling Stone Top 100	10

== Certifications ==
Region	Certification	Certified units/sales
New Zealand (RMNZ)	Platinum	30,000^{‡}
United States (RIAA)	2× Platinum	2,000,000^{‡}
^{‡} Sales+streaming figures based on certification alone.
