= Off Deez =

Single by JID and J. Cole

from the album DiCaprio 2
- Released: November 6, 2018
- Recorded: 2018
- Genre: Hip hop
- Length: 3:33
- Label: Dreamville; Interscope; Spillage Village
- Songwriters: Destin Route; Jermaine Cole; Chase Dalton Rose; Joel Cavazos; José Vaca Flores
- Producers: ChaseTheMoney; Dro Fe

JID singles chronology
"151 Rum" (2018)	"Off Deez" (2018)	"Down Bad" (2019)

J. Cole singles chronology
"Sojourner" (2018)	"Off Deez" (2018)	"A Lot" (2019)

Music video
- "Off Deez" on YouTube

"Off Deez" is a song by American rappers JID and J. Cole. It was released on November 6, 2018, released as the second single for JID's album DiCaprio 2. The song is produced by ChaseTheMoney and Dro Fe. It also includes vocals from DJ Drama, who was the host for the album. The song samples "Esclavo Y Amo" by Los Pasteles Verdes.

== Background ==
On November 4, 2018, JID announced the album's second single, "Off Deez", which is a hip hop song and a collaboration with J. Cole, JID previewed the song on Instagram live a few days earlier. The song was released on November 6, and was produced by ChaseTheMoney, with additional production from Dro Fe.

On November 17, in an interview, JID revealed that he originally sent the song to Kendrick Lamar before sending it to J. Cole, however due to scheduling differences, the collaboration did not happen.

I sent it to Kendrick [Lamar] first. Facts, that’s 100% what happened. I sent it Kendrick first. Long shot, Kendrick was going on The Championship Tour so it was just a long shot. I knew it wasn’t gonna happen and it’s understandable because he’s a superstar and has obligations. I sent it through the proper channels it just didn’t work out, but he fucked with it.

== Critical reception ==
The song received positive reviews for its rapid lyricism with Yoh Phillips of DJBooth saying "Chase The Money gave J.I.D a moon bounce to jump on. This beat is so animated and fun. This rhyme pattern for the hook is a mouthful. The entire song, really. I can't imagine his fans being able to follow this scheme, but they will try and that’s fun. His breath control isn’t human. Cole is crazy for jumping on this." Jonah Bromwich of Pitchfork said "Cole gets off a strong verse, and the song, 'Off Deez', is one of many standouts here. But you can just imagine them stepping out of booth, J.I.D pumped and ready for more; Cole relieved that he can still rap as well as his younger signee."

== Music video ==
The music video for "Off Deez" was released on December 4, 2018, and was directed by Cole Bennett. The video features a cameo from rapper Joey Badass. HotNewHipHop described it as "a perfect visual that matches the frantic energy of the song itself."

== Certifications ==
Region	Certification	Certified units/sales
Australia (ARIA)	Gold	35,000^{‡}
Canada (Music Canada)	Gold	40,000^{‡}
United States (RIAA)	Platinum	1,000,000^{‡}
^{‡} Sales+streaming figures based on certification alone.
