= Never (JID song) =

2016 single by JID

Single by JID

from the album The Never Story
- Released: December 16, 2016
- Genre: Hip hop
- Length: 4:01
- Label: Dreamville; Interscope; Spillage Village
- Songwriters: Destin Route; John Welch; Markus Randle
- Producers: Christo; Childish Major

JID singles chronology
"Can't Call It" (2016)	"Never" (2016)	"Bruuuh" (2017)

Music video
- "Never" on YouTube

"Never" (stylized in all caps) is a song by American rapper JID, released on December 16, 2016, as the lead single from his debut studio album The Never Story (2017). It was produced by Christo and Childish Major.

== Background ==
In a press statement, JID said he wrote the song "at a point in my life when I had nothing and when my future seemed uncertain. Throughout it all I had was my family and great people around me who allowed me to pen my pain and take a chance on pursuing my dreams."

== Composition ==
The song finds JID describing the hard times in his life and what he lacked, stating he has "never been shit", "never had shit" and "never knew shit" among other things, as well as his perseverance and how he "never gave two shits". He concludes with the lyrics "make the crowd jump like Zoboomafoo". JID's performance of the song has been described as evoking Kendrick Lamar's style in the album Good Kid, M.A.A.D City.

== Critical reception ==
Peter A. Berry of XXL commented the song is "basically the nimble wordsmith's casual resignation to a bleak lifestyle". Scott Glaysher of HipHopDX praised the song, writing "He really steps up his bravado on the million viewed hit 'NEVER'. Christo Welch and Childish Major provide the type of hypnotic beat that has the potential to choke slam you into the sunken place."

== Music video ==
The music video was released on February 20, 2017. It begins with JID sitting alone in a "half-way broken down" bus, under flickering lights. He is then seen being beaten by a couple of police officers and is running from them by the end of the video.

== Certifications ==
Region	Certification	Certified units/sales
Australia (ARIA)	Gold	35,000^{‡}
United States (RIAA)	Gold	500,000^{‡}
^{‡} Sales+streaming figures based on certification alone.
