= Deante' Hitchcock =

American rapper

- Born: Deante' Van Hitchcock; March 10, 1993 (age 33); Riverdale, Georgia, U.S.
- Genres: Hip-hop
- Occupations: Rapper; singer
- Instrument: Vocals
- Years active: 2012–present
- Labels: ByStorm, RCA Records

Deante' Van Hitchcock (born March 10, 1993), is an American rapper from Riverdale, Georgia. He initially gained recognition as a rapper following the releases of three mixtapes: 19 Summers (2012), Wishful Thinking (2015) and Good (2016). He received widespread attention on the internet in 2016 after a weekly series of freestyles called New Atlanta Tuesday's. In 2017, he signed to ByStorm and RCA Records. His debut album Better was released on May 13, 2020.

== Early life ==
From Riverdale Georgia, Deante' Hitchcock started rapping at age 12 where he was in a group. His uncle, who co-wrote TLC's "No Scrubs", introduced him to music. He attended Georgia Southern University, and dropped out in his junior year in college to pursue his music career.

== Musical career ==
=== 2012–18: Career beginnings and various projects ===
Deante' Hitchcock's musical career began in college, when he released his first mixtape, 19 Summers, on September 17, 2012. His first official mixtape titled Wishful Thinking was released on February 24, 2015. During 2016, Hitchcock gained more recognition after releasing more weekly freestyles, which went viral and reached the attention of Wale. He released his second mixtape titled Good on July 28, 2016. The mixtape was also available to purchase and on streaming services, and is the first of a trilogy. The in-concert recording live album of this mixtape was released on March 9, 2017. A month prior, Hitchcock released his first EP called Just a Sample on Valentine's Day in 2017. On July 9, 2017, Hitchcock released an EP with fellow Atlanta rapper Michael Aristotle titled No Pressure.

Hitchcock's career received a boost when he signed with the RCA-affiliated ByStorm label, where he released the six-track EP So Much for Good Luck on October 13, 2017. The EP included the single "Wide Open" featuring GoldLink. On June 18, 2018, he released his fourth EP called Thank You For Your Patience after the release of his album experienced delays due to sample clearances. In late 2018, he was on tour with 6LACK for the From East Atlanta With Love tour.

=== 2019–21: Just a Sample 2 and Better ===
On January 6, 2019, Deante' Hitchcock was invited to the Dreamville recording sessions for the compilation album Revenge of the Dreamers III, appearing on the song "PTSD". Hitchcock spoke with XXL about the sessions saying "The first day, everybody was surprised as hell when the shit first started popping up. Everybody started seeing folks posting golden tickets and invites. I peeped the location, like, 'Yo, it's in Atlanta? Right here in our backyard.' I ain’t get an invite on the first day. I was feeling some type of way. But I was like, 'That just mean I’ve got to work harder.' That next morning, I got my invite from Mark Pitts. He sent me and [Young] Nudy. I was there every day I could be." He was also a supporting act during the Catch Me If You Can Tour with JID in 2019.

On March 15, he released the EP Just a Sample 2, with guest appearances from Childish Major, H.E.R. and Kilo Ali. Prior to release, the EP was led by singles "7:45" and "Side Nigga Anthem". He also released music videos for "Changed For You" and "Never (Let You Go)". In November 2019, he released the single "How TF" featuring 6LACK, supported by a music video in March 2020. On April 15, he released the second single "I Got Money Now" featuring JID. His debut album Better was released on May 13, 2020, including guest appearances from Young Nudy, Miguel, and St. Beauty.

=== 2022–present: Everyday the 14TH ===
On February 18, Deante' Hitchcock released an EP titled Everyday the 14TH, with guest appearances from Bairi, Dende, DaVionne, JaelSpeaks, Chris Patrick, and ELHAE.

== Artistry ==
=== Influences ===
Deante' Hitchcock has been favorably compared to the likes of T.I. and J. Cole. Hitchcock also cited Lil Wayne, Jay-Z, André 3000, and 2Pac as his favorite rappers.

== Discography ==
=== Studio albums ===
| Title | Album details |
|---|---|
| Better | Released: May 13, 2020; Label: ByStorm, RCA; Format: Digital download |
| Once Upon A Time | Released: May 10, 2023; Label: ByStorm, RCA; Format: Digital download |
| Good Things Take Time | Released: April 11, 2025; Label: Do Better Records, 195 Oak; Format: Digital download |

=== Live albums ===
| Title | Album details |
|---|---|
| Good: Live | Released: March 9, 2017; Label: Do Better; Format: Digital download |
| Deante' Hitchcock: Live from Quarantine | Released: January 28, 2021; Label: ByStorm, RCA; Format: Digital download |

=== Extended plays ===
| Title | Album details |
|---|---|
| Just a Sample | Released: February 14, 2017; Format: Digital Download |
| No Pressure (with Michael Aristotle) | Released: July 9, 2017; Format: Digital Download |
| So Much for Good Luck | Released: October 13, 2017; Label: ByStorm, RCA; Format: Digital Download |
| Thank You For Your Patience | Released: June 18, 2018; Format: Digital Download |
| Just a Sample 2 | Released: March 15, 2019; Label: ByStorm, RCA; Format: Digital Download |
| Everyday the 14TH | Released: February 18, 2022; Label: ByStorm, RCA; Format: Digital Download |

=== Mixtapes ===
| Title | Album details |
|---|---|
| 19 Summers | Released: September 17, 2012; Format: Digital Download |
| Wishful Thinking | Released: February 24, 2015; Format: Digital Download |
| Good | Released: July 28, 2016; Label: Do Better; Format: Digital download |

=== Singles ===
==== As lead artist ====
| Title | Year | Album |
|---|---|---|
| "No Secret" | 2017 | Good |
| "4 You and Yours" | 2017 | Good |
| "Wide Open" (featuring GoldLink) | 2017 | So Much For Good Luck |
| "7:45" | 2019 | Just a Sample 2 |
| "Side Nigga Anthem" | 2019 | Just a Sample 2 |
| "How TF" (featuring 6LACK) | 2019 | Better |
| "I Got Money Now" (featuring JID) | 2020 | Better |
| "Neck Up" (featuring Bairi & Dende) | 2022 | Everyday the 14TH |

==== As featured artist ====
| Title | Year | Album |
|---|---|---|
| "Give" (Kenny Mason featuring Deante' Hitchcock) | 2020 | —N/a |
| "Orgasm Full of Pain" (Guapdad 4000 featuring Deante' Hitchcock) | 2020 | Platinum Falcon Returns |

=== Guest appearances ===
List of non-single guest appearances, with other performing artists, showing year released and album name
| Title | Year | Other artist(s) | Album |
|---|---|---|---|
| "Make It Thru" | 2016 | Michael Aristotle | Mega Millions |
| "Swimming Lessons" | 2016 | Michael Aristotle, LaDonnis | Mega Millions |
| "Winning" | 2016 | Jermaine Dupri, Da Brat | —N/a |
| "The Other Side" | 2017 | Luey Northern | #Victoria EP |
| "Greatness" | 2017 | Yani Mo | The Moment |
| "Mayretta (Atlanta Remix)" | 2017 | B.L.A.C.K. Baron, Scotty Atl, Joe Gifted | —N/a |
| "Tides" | 2018 | St. Beauty | Running to the Sun |
| "How I Feel" | 2018 | Quake Matthews | Drinking Games |
| "New Phone, Who Dis?" | 2018 | KD the Poet | Parked Car Conversations |
| "We The People" | 2019 | Rebel Rae | —N/a |
| "Better" | 2019 | Kelechi | —N/a |
| "PTSD" | 2019 | Omen, Mereba, St. Beauty | Revenge of the Dreamers III |
| "Ted Talk" | 2020 | Mickey Aristotle, Cantrell | Almost There |
| "Typical Shit" | 2020 | Chris Patrick | From The Heart, Vol. 2 |
| "Baptize (Remix)" | 2021 | Spillage Village, Zombie Juice, Erick the Architect, Hollywood JB & IDK | —N/a |
| "3 Years" | 2021 | Ellery Bonham | Quarterlife Blur |
| "Too Much, Too Fast" | 2021 | Kari Faux | Lowkey Superstar |
| "Impatient (Remix)" | 2021 | Josh Dean | —N/a |
| "Geordan Favors" | 2021 | Isaiah Rashad | The House Is Burning |

== Tours ==
Supporting

- Wisdom Is Power Tour (Rapsody) (2017)
- From East Atlanta With Love (6LACK) (2018)
- Catch Me If You Can Tour (JID) (2019)
- Everything Is Fine Tour (Wale) (2019)
- 85 To Africa (Jidenna) (2019)
