= Danger (Spider) =

2023 song by Offset And JID

Song by Offset and JID

from the album Metro Boomin Presents Spider-Man: Across the Spider-Verse (Soundtrack from & Inspired by the Motion Picture)
- Released: June 2, 2023
- Recorded: 2022
- Genre: Trap
- Length: 3:26
- Label: Boominati; Republic
- Songwriters: Kiari Cephus; Destin Route; Carlton Mays, Jr.
- Producer: Honorable C.N.O.T.E.

"Danger (Spider)" is a song by American rappers Offset and JID. It was released through Boominati Worldwide and Republic Records as the fourth track from Metro Boomin's first soundtrack album, which was for the film Spider-Man: Across the Spider-Verse.

== Background ==
On May 29 and 30, 2023, Metro announced on his social media accounts that both Offset and JID would appear on the soundtrack.

== Charts ==
Chart performance for "Danger (Spider)"
Chart (2023)	Peak position
Canada Hot 100 (Billboard)	80
Global 200 (Billboard)	185
US Billboard Hot 100	95
US Hot R&B/Hip-Hop Songs (Billboard)	35
