= 151 Rum (song) =

2018 song by JID

Single by JID

from the album DiCaprio 2
- Released: September 19, 2018
- Recorded: 2018
- Genre: Hip hop
- Length: 2:36
- Label: Dreamville; Interscope; Spillage Village
- Songwriters: Destin Route; John Welch; Peter Mudge
- Producers: Nice Rec; Christo

JID singles chronology
"Hasta Luego" (2017)	"151 Rum" (2018)	"Off Deez" (2018)

Music video
- "151 Rum" on YouTube

"151 Rum" is a song by American rapper JID, released on September 19, 2018 as the lead single from his second studio album, DiCaprio 2. It was produced by Nice Rec and Christo. it is also featured in the soundtrack for the 2024 movie Monkey Man directed by Dev Patel.

== Critical reception ==
Kevin Goddard of HotNewHipHop called the song a "lyrical onslaught".

Charles Holmes of Rolling Stone said "J.I.D.'s flow is the crowning achievement of '151 Rum'. Nimble, sparse and blunt, every word serves the song's plot. It's hard to make a chorus that contains a tongue twister like, '151 rum and a blunt, young nigga numb, numb, numb and he got a little gun / A little bitty killer really doin' it for fun, give him a little bit and he'll get a nigga done' work musically and technically. But the rapid flow, haunting chants and J.I.D's bars transform the song into the audio equivalent of running for one's life".

== Music video ==
The music video for "151 Rum" premiered on May 1, 2019. It was directed by Scott Lazer, and features a cameo from his producer DJ Christo. In the video's plot, J.I.D is kidnapped and forced to perform. Complex called the video "dark and intense".

== Certifications ==
Region	Certification	Certified units/sales
Australia (ARIA)	Gold	35,000^{‡}
Canada (Music Canada)	Platinum	80,000^{‡}
United States (RIAA)	Platinum	1,000,000^{‡}
^{‡} Sales+streaming figures based on certification alone.
