= WRK (song) =

2025 single by JID

Single by JID

from the album God Does Like Ugly
- Released: April 18, 2025
- Genre: Trap
- Length: 3:14
- Label: Dreamville; Interscope
- Songwriters: Destin Route; Asheton Hogan; John Welch
- Producers: Pluss; Christo

JID singles chronology
"Crazier" (2024)	"WRK" (2025)	"Bodies" (2025)

Music video
- "WRK" on YouTube

"WRK" (pronounced "work") is a song by American rapper JID, released on April 18, 2025 as the lead single from his fourth studio album, God Does Like Ugly (2025). It was produced by Pluss and Christo.

== Background ==
JID first previewed the song during his performance at the Dreamville Festival on April 6, 2025. On April 15, he teased the song in a video on Instagram, revealing details behind the creation:

Starting this new journey coming off The Forever Story has been a very strange, productive, yet tedious process. I remember not feeling like I got what I think I deserved after that album came out and it sent me into a dark place (for maybe 20 minutes I ain't no bitch.) Fast forward to Pluss playin' this beat for me in the studio and all I could hear was my OG coach saying, "Let's go to work." I live my life by the saying "you can only control what you can control," so this is the first step into a new world that I control. And. It's. Fucking. UGLY

== Composition ==
The instrumental contains "dense" percussion and "layers of textured synths", over which JID raps in fast-paced delivery. Lyrically, he centers around about satisfying his ambition and obsession in working on his music and the emotional toll of his effort, such as sacrificing his sleep and mental peace. The song also serves as a response to his critics.

== Critical reception ==
The song received generally positive reviews. Sam Moore of HipHopDX called it "a typically breakneck lyrical affair." Bryson "Boom" Paul of HotNewHipHop described the production as "creating a sonic landscape that feels urgent yet polished" and wrote "JID's wordplay remains sharp, but it’s his transparency that cuts deeper this time." Margaret Farrell of Stereogum wrote, "It's a dynamic and bouncy track, showing off JID's agile flow, packed with melodic cries and an unexpected vocal shift from the rapper towards the end."

== Music video ==
An official music video was released on May 14, 2025. Set in a war-torn Atlanta, it sees JID rapping in the wreckage of an abandoned skyscraper as he surveys the land. He leads a squad of masked rebels in a conflict against authority figures in hazmat suits who seek to destroy hip-hop culture, and thereby all related items such as turntables, microphones and speakers. Toward the end, the clip shows a cobbled together museum of the city's history, with artifacts such as album covers, rapper Young Scooter's American flag bandana, a 20-inch auto wheel and videotape of God Does Like Ugly, which a young survivor plays in a VCR.

== Charts ==
Chart performance for "WRK"
Chart (2025)	Peak position
New Zealand Hot Singles (RMNZ)	19
