= DiCaprio 2 =

Studio album by JID
- Released: November 26, 2018
- Recorded: 2014−2018
- Genre: Hip hop
- Length: 50:09
- Labels: Dreamville; Interscope; Spillage Village
- Producers: Jermaine Cole (also exec.); Christo (also exec.); Ibrahim Hamad (exec.); 2thirty5; Bobby Kritical; Cubeatz; E Wonder; ChaseTheMoney; Dro Fe; Elite; Frankie P.; Kenny Beats; Mac Miller; Masego; Nice Rec; Ron Gilmore; Skhye Hutch; Unxque; WondaGurl; Zorro

JID chronology
The Never Story (2017)	DiCaprio 2 (2018)	Spilligion (2020)

Alternative cover
- Original cover

Singles from DiCaprio 2
- 1. "Hasta Luego" Released: July 7, 2017; 2. "151 Rum" Released: September 19, 2018; 3. "Off Deez" Released: November 6, 2018

DiCaprio 2 is the second studio album by American rapper JID, hosted by DJ Drama. It was released on November 26, 2018, by Dreamville Records, Interscope Records and Spillage Village. The album serves as the follow-up to his debut album, The Never Story (2017), and a sequel to his extended play DiCaprio (2015). The album was supported by two singles: "151 Rum" and "Off Deez" with J. Cole.

The album features guest appearances from 6LACK, ASAP Ferg, BJ the Chicago Kid, Ella Mai, J. Cole, Joey Badass and Method Man. Production of DiCaprio 2 was handled by a variety of record producers, including Christo, J. Cole, Elite, Nice Rec, Hollywood JB, WondaGurl, Kenny Beats, Skhye Hutch, Ron Gilmore, ChaseTheMoney and the late Mac Miller among others, contributing to the album.

The album explores a variety of topics including competition, loyalty, criticism, depression, drug abuse and women's empowerment. It also touches on other topics such as gang violence, African-American culture, and love.

== Background ==
JID said that each song on the album feels "like an individual film", and rapper Mac Miller helped post-produce and arrange almost every song on the album before his untimely death. JID was supposed to serve as an opening act for Mac Miller on his Swimming Tour, but the tour was cancelled. JID has also said that rapper J. Cole helped him work on the storytelling for this album. The album experienced several delays due to issues with sample clearances.

== Title and artwork ==
On September 15, 2018, JID revealed promotional artwork for the album. The design draws inspiration from the film, Inception (2010), and is a replica of the "spinning top" of which never quite stops as the movie comes to an end. On October 31, JID revealed of what was then billed as the album's official artwork, featuring Konrad Annerud, a model and look-alike of actor and film producer, Leonardo DiCaprio. The album was released on November 26, with the cover of the DiCaprio look-alike as the official artwork, but was mysteriously changed a week later on streaming services to the alternate artwork of which features JID in the form of a golden statuette holding a number two and was inspired by the iconic Academy Awards statuette. JID later confirmed that the artwork, featuring the golden statuette was the new official cover for the album and explained the change of artwork to fans on Twitter, saying, "That artwork is what the artwork was supposed to be upon release, but they couldn't change until after we dropped for upload reason."

The album's title was inspired by DiCaprio; JID has cited DiCaprio as his favorite actor. JID's manager Zekiel "Zeke" Nicholson explained why the album is an interesting contrast between the artist and actor:

The DiCaprio theme is really an ode in the biggest way. You don't know what movie DiCaprio is going to be in. What you expect is a performance at the end of the day. That's kind of the mantra we went with for this project: let's give them a bunch of different movies. But in these movies the performances are high-level. These are movies that deserve to be rewarded.

== Release and promotion ==
On October 31, 2018, to celebrate his birthday, JID revealed the album's release date. On November 11, JID revealed the album's tracklist, blurring out the album's remaining features, other than J. Cole on already released single, "Off Deez". JID revealed the remaining features on November 15. On November 19, JID released the album's trailer. In the trailer, JID depicts six scenes from DiCaprio's films: Inception, The Revenant, The Wolf Of Wall Street, Titanic, Django Unchained, and The Aviator, with album instrumentals for each scene.

JID announced the first leg of his Catch Me If You Can tour on December 4, 2018, in support of the album. Leg one begun on January 22, 2019, in Eugene, Oregon and conclude in New Orleans on March 23. Reason, Lou The Human, and Hardo served as opening acts on the first leg of the tour. The second leg of the tour was announced on February 12, with Saba, Mereba, Deante' Hitchcock, and Mez serving as supporting acts.

=== Singles ===
On September 16, 2018, JID announced the album's first single, titled "151 Rum". The single was released on September 19. The song was produced by Christo and Nice Rec. The music video was released on May 1, 2019.

On November 4, JID announced the album's second single, "Off Deez" featuring J. Cole. The song was released on November 6, and was produced by ChaseTheMoney, with additional production from Dro Fe. The music video for "Off Deez" was released on December 4, and was directed by Cole Bennet. The video features a cameo from rapper Joey Badass.

=== Other songs ===
"Hasta Luego" was originally released on July 7, 2017. The song was initially recorded for his debut album, The Never Story (2017). On October 3, 2018, JID premiered the song "Workin Out" on A COLORS SHOW. On November 28, JID performed "Skrawberries" on the Tonight Show Starring Jimmy Fallon (with BJ the Chicago Kid and Thundercat), paying tribute to the late Mac Miller. On March 6, 2019, JID released the music video for "Off da Zoinkys", directed by Scott Lazer. The music video recreates the opening tracking shot from Robert Altman's 1973 film, The Long Goodbye, based on Raymond Chandler's 1953 novel of the same title. The video stars actor and singer Ansel Elgort playing Philip Marlowe.

== Critical reception ==
Professional ratings
Aggregate scores
Source	Rating
Metacritic	80/100
Review scores
Source	Rating
AllMusic	4.5/5 stars
HotNewHipHop	87%
Comm Radio	4/5 stars
Pitchfork	7.7/10
Highsnobiety	4.5/5 stars
HipHopDX	4.3/5
Exclaim!	9/10

DiCaprio 2 was met with critical acclaim. At Metacritic, which assigns a normalized rating out of 100 to reviews from mainstream publications, the album received an average score of 80, based on six reviews, indicating "generally favorable reviews". Writing for Uproxx, Aaron Williams praised the album calling it "the blueprint for the next generation of talent in the rap game". He continued saying: "DiCaprio 2 is a masterclass in the good things that happen when an up-and-coming talent takes the game seriously enough to work on the skills. JID's one of those rappers who'd be compelling on his own; his story, voice, and charisma are all enough to make him a star almost by default." Mitch Findlay of HotNewHipHop gave the album an 87% rating saying, "DiCaprio 2 has positioned him for something truly monumental. It might be too early to count him among the game's best current lyricists. But then again, there's no time like the present."

In a positive review from HipHopDX, Scott Glaysher said, "As cliché as it sounds, there is something for everyone and their mother on DiCaprio 2. J.I.D. breaks the mold originally set by J. Cole, takes all the best parts and mixes them with his own distinctive practice and pitch that work seamlessly with the array of trap and soulful beats (Thanks Christo and company)." Jonah Bromwich of Pitchfork complimented the sounds of each track with noting that "J.I.D's melodic instincts are strong, sharing ties with Isaiah Rashad and even, occasionally, Bone Thugs, and he has the ability to get jokes off even in the midst of triple-time rapping, a la Big L or Lil Wayne. Eric Lowers of Exclaim! admired its concept of the whole body of work saying "Dicaprio 2 exemplifies what the ideal student of the game sounds like — someone who's conscious of how a hook presents itself, how to control their delivery and how to diversify their lyrical bonds. He added that "Though J.I.D isn't as seasoned as Leonardo DiCaprio just yet, he is the inception of what makes someone the G.O.A.T.". Jerome Taylor of Comm Radio praised the albums details saying that "Although the most remarkable aspect of the album is J.I.D's technical lyrical ability, he also showcases the ability to provide social commentary, be introspective, and deliver impressive R&B cuts during the middle of DiCaprio 2".

=== Accolades ===
Publication	List	Rank	Ref.
Billboard	The 20 Best Hip-Hop Albums of 2018: Critics' Picks	17	
Complex	The Best Albums of 2018	20	
HotNewHipHop	Top 30 Hottest Hip-Hop Albums of 2018	7	
NPR Music	50 Best Albums of 2018	48	
Rolling Stone	30 Best Hip-Hop Albums of 2018	13	
Vibe	The 30 Best Albums Of 2018	11	

== Commercial performance ==
With only four days of tracking, the album sold 16,970 album-equivalent units in the first week, debuting at number 41 on the US Billboard 200 chart and number 21 on the US Top R&B/Hip-Hop Albums chart.

== In other media ==
The track "Skrawberries" appeared on the 2019 video game NBA 2K20.

== Track listing ==
No.	Title	Writer(s)	Producer(s)	Length
1.	"Frequency Change"	Destin Route; John Welch; Eian Parker; Suliman Chillis; Michael Kelly; Barbara Wilson	Christo	0:59
2.	"Slick Talk"	Route; Charles Elijah Carter-Callahan; Kenneth Blume III; Welch	E Wonder; Kenny Beats; Christo^{[a]}	4:29
3.	"Westbrook" (with ASAP Ferg)	Route; Darold Ferguson Jr.; Welch	Christo	3:57
4.	"Off Deez" (with J. Cole)	Route; Jermaine Cole; Chase Rose; Joel Cavazos; José Flores	ChaseTheMoney; Dro Fe^{[a]}	3:33
5.	"151 Rum"	Route; John Welch; Peter Mudge	Christo; Nice Rec	2:36
6.	"Off da Zoinkys"	Route; Welch; Clara Shepherd; Jimmy Weary	Christo	3:28
7.	"Workin Out"	Route; Carson Guidicessi; Arthur Herzog; Billie Holiday; Zack Fox	2thirty5; Unxque^{[a]}	3:46
8.	"Tiiied" (featuring 6lack and Ella Mai)	Route; Ricardo Valentine, Jr.; Ella Mai Howell; Andrzej Zylis; Anthony Parrino; Ronald Gilmore	Elite; Ron Gilmore^{[a]}	4:04
9.	"Skrawberries" (featuring BJ the Chicago Kid)	Route; Bryan Sledge; Cole; Patrick Adams; Louis David	J. Cole; Mac Miller^{[b]}; Masego^{[b]}; Gilmore^{[b]}	3:38
10.	"Hot Box" (featuring Method Man and Joey Badass)	Route; Clifford Smith; Jo-Vaughn Scott; Derrick Hutchins, Jr.; Zorro Golden-Roberts; Hale Smith; Emil Boyd	Skhye Hutch; Zorro	4:51
11.	"Mounted Up"	Route; Justin Bryant; Welch	Hollywood JB; Christo^{[a]}	3:02
12.	"Just Da Other Day"	Route; Bobby Turner, Jr.; Welch	Bobby Kritical; Christo^{[a]}	3:49
13.	"Despacito Too"	Route; Frank Parra; Zayden Johnson; Bob James	Frankie P.	4:14
14.	"Hasta Luego" (Bonus)	Route; Ebony Oshunrinde; Kevin Gomringer; Tim Gomringer	WondaGurl; Cubeatz	3:41
Total length:				50:09

Notes

- ^{^[a]} signifies an additional producer
- ^{^[b]} signifies an uncredited producer
- "Skrawberries" was originally titled as "Skrawberries (For Da Ladies)"
- "Off Deez", "Off da Zoinkys", "Hot Box", "Mounted Up", and "Just Da Other Day" features additional vocals by DJ Drama
- "Workin Out" features additional vocals by Zack Fox and Ayden
- "Tiied" features additional vocals by Yung Baby Tate and Mereba
- "Despacito Too" features additional vocals by Zayden Johnson

Sample credits

- ”Off Deez” contains a sample from “Esclavo Y Amo”, written by José Flores, as performed by Los Pasteles Verdes.
- "Off da Zoinkys" contains a sample from "I'm So Grateful (Keep In Touch)", written by Clara Shepherd and Jimmy Weary, as performed by Crowns of Glory.
- "Workin Out" contains a sample from "Don't Explain", written by Arthur Herzog and Billie Holiday, as performed by Helen Merrill.
- "Skrawberries" contains a sample from "No If's &'s or But's", written by Patrick Adams and Louis David, as performed by J. J. Barnes.
- "Hot Box" contains a sample from "I Love Music", written by Hale Smith and Emil Boyd, as performed by Ahmad Jamal Trio.
- "Tiiied" contains a sample from "Happy Turnout", written and performed by Andrzej Zylis.
- "Despacito Too" contains a sample from "Earth Tones", written by Bob James, as performed by Grover Washington Jr.
- "Hasta Luego" contains a sample from "Puella in Somnio" (from the soundtrack to Puella Magi Madoka Magica), written by Yuki Kajiura.

== Personnel ==
Instrumentation

- Sebastian Ramirez − bass (track 7)
- Masego − saxophone (track 9)

Technical

- Raul Chirinos − mixing (tracks 2−14), recording (track 5, 7, 8, 10, 13)
- Juro "Mez" Davis − mixing (tracks 1−4, 6, 8−10, 13), recording (track 7, 8)
- John "Christo" Welch − recording (track 1)
- Chris Athens − mastering (all tracks)
- Hector Castro − recording (track 2, 3, 10, 11, 13)
- Malcolm McCormick − recording arranger (track 7−9, 12)

== Charts ==
Chart (2018)	Peak position
Belgian Albums (Ultratop Flanders)	142
Canadian Albums (Billboard)	52
Dutch Albums (Album Top 100)	184
Irish Albums (IRMA)	85
US Billboard 200	41

== Certifications ==
Certifications for DiCaprio 2
Region	Certification	Certified units/sales
New Zealand (RMNZ)	Gold	7,500^{‡}
^{‡} Sales+streaming figures based on certification alone.
