= Chaz French =

American rapper

- Born: Chaz Gibson French; May 1991 (age 34); Northeast, Washington, D.C., United States
- Genres: Hip hop
- Occupation: Rapper
- Labels: Capitol; Motown; 368; All Season

Chaz Gibson French (born May 1991) is an American rapper based in Northeast, Washington, D.C.

== Early life and career ==
French grew up in Northeast and Temple Hills. Growing up, he was not allowed to listen to hip hop but was exposed to gospel music. He went to Eleanor Roosevelt High School in Greenbelt, Maryland before transferring to Champaign in Illinois and Arlington in Texas. During French's childhood, his father went to prison. He eventually dropped out of high school despite completing a GED program. French lived in various places in Texas before becoming homeless for a short period. A mutual associate of French and rapper Phil Adé played the former's music for the latter, who was impressed and introduced him to co-founder of the label 368 Music Group, Andre “Dre the Mayor” Hopson. French then signed to the label within two weeks. Being the father of a son and a daughter, French wrote an open letter to fathers on Father's Day.

His debut mixtape Happy Belated, featuring collaborations with artists such as GoldLink and Wale, was released in October 2014.

His debut studio album True Colors, featuring seventeen tracks and collaborators such as Casey Veggies, Phil Ade, Shy Glizzy and BJ The Chicago Kid, was released alongside his debut single "Way Out" on July 14, 2017, via Capitol and Motown. He was also signed to the labels. In a statement, he said "I’m happy for my label ThreeSixEight and I love my new Motown family." French told Respect "This album means everything to me from start to finish. I put my heart and soul into every song."
