= Lute (rapper) =

American rapper from North Carolina

- Born: Luther Nicholson; Charlotte, North Carolina, U.S.
- Genres: Hip hop
- Occupations: Rapper; songwriter
- Years active: 2012–present
- Labels: Dreamville; Interscope

Luther Nicholson, (born July 6, 1989) better known by his stage name Lute, is an American rapper. He is signed to J. Cole's Dreamville Records. He released his first mixtape, West1996, in 2012, his debut album, West1996 pt. 2, in 2017, and his second album Gold Mouf in 2021.

== Musical career ==
=== 2012-2014: West1996 ===
Lute is a former member of Forever FC, the Charlotte hip-hop collective which has disbanded. Since then, Lute released his first mixtape titled, West1996, on February 22, 2012. The mixtape received attention from many, including Pete Rock, who shared the mixtape on his Twitter page.

=== 2015–present: Signing to Dreamville and West1996 pt. 2 ===
On December 8, 2015, it was officially announced that Lute was signed to J. Cole's, Dreamville Records. Lute was also featured on Dreamville's compilation album titled Revenge of the Dreamers II, on a track titled "Still Slummin'". On August 25, 2017, Lute released his first official single "Juggin'" from his album. His debut album, West1996 pt. 2, had received several push backs, but was finally released on September 29, 2017. Other promotional singles and music videos for the album include songs "Premonition" and "Morning Shift". Lute also went on the 4 Your Eyez Only World Tour with J. Cole in 2017, and with JID and EarthGang in 2017.

=== 2020–present: Gold Mouf ===
On February 4, 2020, he released the single "GED (Gettin Every Dolla)", which he performed at the halftime show of the Houston Rockets @Charlotte Hornets on March 7, 2020. On July 6, 2020 he released the single "Life" along with a music video. On August 14, 2020, Lute released the song "Get It and Go", featuring Blakk Soul, from the Madden NFL 21 soundtrack. On May 31, 2021, Lute released the third single, "Myself" featuring Devn. The music video was later released on August 16.

On October 4, 2021, Lute released his second album Gold Mouf. The album includes guest appearances from labelmates JID, Cozz, and Ari Lennox, in addition to Little Brother, Saba, Westside Boogie, BJ the Chicago Kid, Blakk Soul, and Devn.

== Discography ==
=== Studio albums ===
List of albums, with selected details
Title	Album details
West1996 pt. 2	Released: September 29, 2017; Label: Dreamville, Interscope; Format: CD, digital download, streaming
Gold Mouf	Released: October 4, 2021; Label: Dreamville, Interscope; Format: CD, digital download, streaming

=== Mixtapes ===
Title	Album details
West1996	Released: February 22, 2012; Format: Digital Download

=== Extended plays ===
Title	Album details
Untitled	Released: September 11, 2018; Format: Digital Download

=== Compilation albums ===
List of albums, with selected chart positions
Title	Details	Peak chart positions			Certifications
Title	Details	US	US R&B/HH	US Rap	Certifications
Revenge of the Dreamers II (with Dreamville)	Released: December 8, 2015; Label: Dreamville, Interscope; Format: CD, digital download	29	4	3	
Revenge of the Dreamers III (with Dreamville)	Released: July 5, 2019; Label: Dreamville, Interscope; Format: CD, digital download	1	1	1	RIAA: Platinum
D-Day: A Gangsta Grillz Mixtape (with Dreamville)	Released: March 31, 2022; Label: Dreamville, Interscope; Format: Digital download	11	6	4	

=== Singles ===
==== As lead artist ====
Title	Year	Album
"Still Slummin'"	2017	West1996 pt. 2
"Juggin'"	2017	West1996 pt. 2
"Morning Shift"	2017	West1996 pt. 2
"GED (Gettin Every Dolla)"	2020	Gold Mouf
"Life"	2020	Gold Mouf
"Get It and Go" (featuring Blakk Soul)	2020	Madden NFL 21
"Myself" (featuring DEVN)	2021	Gold Mouf
"Ma Boy" (with Dreamville and JID)	2023	Creed III: The Soundtrack

=== Other charted songs ===
List of songs, with selected chart positions, showing year released and album name
Title	Year	Peak chart positions			Certifications	Album
Title	Year	US	US R&B/HH	CAN	Certifications	Album
"Under the Sun" (with J. Cole featuring DaBaby)	2019	44	11	71	RIAA: Platinum	Revenge of the Dreamers III

=== Guest appearances ===
List of non-single guest appearances, with other performing artists, showing year released and album name
Title	Year	Other artist(s)	Album
"So Help Me God"	2018	Phonte	No News Is Good News
"Section 8"	2019	Jackie Spade	Aurafication
"Sleep Deprived"	2019	Omen, Mez, DaVionne	Revenge of the Dreamers III
"Revenge"	2020	Omen, Ari Lennox, EarthGang, Childish Major, Reason	Revenge of the Dreamers III: Director's Cut
"Still Dreamin"	2020	JID, 6lack	Revenge of the Dreamers III: Director's Cut
"Manhattan (Remix)"	2020	Stockz	—N/a
"Starting 5"	2022	Cozz, Omen	D-Day: A Gangsta Grillz Mixtape
"Like Wine"	2022	—N/a	D-Day: A Gangsta Grillz Mixtape
