= Donald P. Bellisario College of Communications =

Coordinates: 40.79647°N 77.86487°W

- Type: Public
- Established: 1929; 96 years ago
- Dean: Marie Hardin
- Location: University Park, Pennsylvania, U.S.
- Campus: University Park
- Website: comm.psu.edu

The Donald P. Bellisario College of Communications is a college at Pennsylvania State University. It is home to four departments: Advertising/Public Relations, Journalism, Film Production and Media Studies, and Telecommunications and Media Industries.

Offering five undergraduate majors, a master's degree in media studies, and a Ph.D. program in mass communications, the college is the largest accredited program of its kind in the United States. The college's facilities are located on the University Park campus.

The school was renamed in 2017 after television producer Donald P. Bellisario following his $30 million donation.

== History ==
Penn State offered its first journalism course in 1911. In 1929, the Department of Journalism was established within the School of Liberal Arts. These early course offerings eventually led to the creation of the School of Journalism in 1955. The advertising programs was first offered in 1936. In 1985, the journalism and advertising programs were combined to form the School of Communications.

Joining the advertising/public relations and journalism programs to form a more comprehensive communications school were programs in film-video, media studies and telecommunications. The film-video program, originating in the College of Arts and Architecture, and the media studies program, previously a communications studies major housed in the College of Liberal Arts, were both introduced at Penn State in the 1960s. The telecommunications major was born in the College of Liberal Arts, dating back to the mid-1970s.

After its establishment in 1985, the School of Communications was renamed the College of Communications in 1995, followed by the departmentalization of the college in 2000. On April 21, 2017, the college was renamed the Donald P. Bellisario College of Communications, after the alumnus Donald P. Bellisario gifted $30 million to support students and faculty in the college, and to establish the Donald P. Bellisario Media Center, which opened in 2021. The college is the largest accredited mass communications program in the United States.

== Facilities ==
The college has facilities located in several buildings on the University Park campus.

The Donald P. Bellisario Media Center (or Bellisario Media Center) opened in 2021. The media center is located in the Willard Building, and brings many of the college's facilities under one roof. The 63,000 square-foot (5,853 sq m) media center contains classrooms, offices, television studios, and spaces for film and video creation, and houses student-media operations. Funding for its construction was supported by University funds and a $30 million dollar gift from Donald P. Bellisario. Construction began in 2019. Classes were first held in the media center in August 2021.

== Alumni ==
There are some 30,000 alumni. The program's more prominent graduates include:

- Donald P. Bellisario, former television series creator and producer
- Charles Bierbauer, former CNN White House correspondent
- Michael Fimognari, cinematographer
- Don Roy King, former director, Saturday Night Live
- Paul Levine, novelist and TV writer
- Mary Beth Long, foreign policy expert, entrepreneur, government official
- Lisa Salters, reporter, ESPN and ESPN on ABC
- Lara Spencer, contributor, Good Morning America
- Ron P. Swegman, angler, artist, and author
- Tom Verducci, award-winning writer and reporter, Fox Sports and Sports Illustrated
- Andrew Kevin Walker, screenwriter, Se7en
- Michael Weinreb, author
- Linda Yaccarino, media executive
