= JID =

American rapper (born 1989)

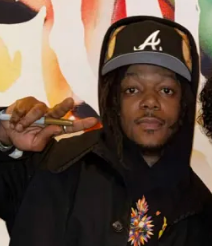
- JID in 2025

Background information
- Born: Destin Choice Route; October 31, 1989 (age 37); Atlanta, Georgia, U.S.
- Genre: Southern hip-hop
- Occupations: Rapper; songwriter
- Works: Discography
- Years active: 2010–present
- Labels: Dreamville; Interscope
- Management: SinceThe80s
- Member of: Spillage Village; Zoink Gang
- Children: 1
- Website: jidsv.com

Destin Choice Route (born October 31, 1989), is an American rapper better known by his stage name JID (also stylized J.I.D). Born and raised in Atlanta, he signed with J. Cole's Dreamville Records, an imprint of Interscope Records, in 2017. He formed the musical collective Spillage Village with EarthGang in 2010, and later assembled the hip hop group Zoink Gang with Smino, Buddy, and Guapdad 4000. His fluent rapping style and usage of wordplay have frequently received acclaim from music critics.

JID gained recognition after self-releasing several projects, including Route of Evil (2012), Para Tu (2013) and DiCaprio (2015). His debut studio album, The Never Story (2017), was met with critical acclaim and contained the single "Never". His second album, DiCaprio 2 (2018), was supported by the singles "151 Rum" and "Off Deez" (with J. Cole), and saw continued critical acclaim. His 2021 single, "Enemy" (with Imagine Dragons)—the opening theme to Netflix's Arcane—peaked at number five on the Billboard Hot 100 and remains his highest-charting song. His third and fourth albums, The Forever Story (2022) and God Does Like Ugly (2025), both received further acclaim and debuted within the Billboard 200's top 15; the former spawned the top 40 single "Surround Sound" (featuring 21 Savage and Baby Tate), while the latter was nominated for Best Rap Album at the 68th Grammy Awards.

== Early life ==
Route was born on October 31, 1989 in Atlanta, Georgia, to Carl Louis Route Jr. and Kathy Jean Route. The youngest of seven children, he adopted the moniker JID from his grandmother's nickname for him based on his "jittery" behavior. Route grew up listening to Sly and the Family Stone and Earth, Wind & Fire before shifting to the 1990s New York hip-hop scene, which included rappers such as Jay-Z, Nas, and Mobb Deep. He attended Stephenson High School, where he played football as a defensive back. During his senior year, he dislocated his hip. He later accepted a full athletic scholarship to play NCAA Division I football at Hampton University in Virginia. Route was redshirted in his first year of eligibility and then played two seasons before he was kicked from the team for skipping practices. He eventually moved in with Doctur Dot and Johnny Venus, a popular rap duo with the stage name EarthGang, who he met while in college.

== Musical career ==
=== 2010–2016: Career beginnings ===
JID released his first mixtape Cakewalk on May 18, 2010. Earlier that year, he had formed Spillage Village with EarthGang, Hollywood JB, and Jordxn Bryant. His second mixtape, Cakewalk 2 , came out on June 29, 2011, followed by Route of All Evil on June 25, 2012, which contained guest features from relatively unheard-of artists EarthGang and Stillz. JID funded his music career working at call centers and delivering pizza before he was booked for live shows. On October 22, 2013, his next mixtape was released titled Para Tu. The mixtape was later re-released on December 29, 2017.

In 2014, he opened with EarthGang and Bas for Ab-Soul's These Days Tour following the release of Spillage Village's first mixtape, Bears Like This. On January 26, 2015, he released his first extended play, DiCaprio EP. On July 6, Spillage Village released their second mixtape Bears Like This Too. He also toured with Omen on the Elephant Eyes Tour and with Bas on the Too High to Riot Tour. On December 2, 2016, Spillage Village released Bears Like This Too Much with features from J. Cole and Bas, and production from Mac Miller, Ducko Mcfli, Childish Major, and J. Cole, among others.

=== 2017: The Never Story ===
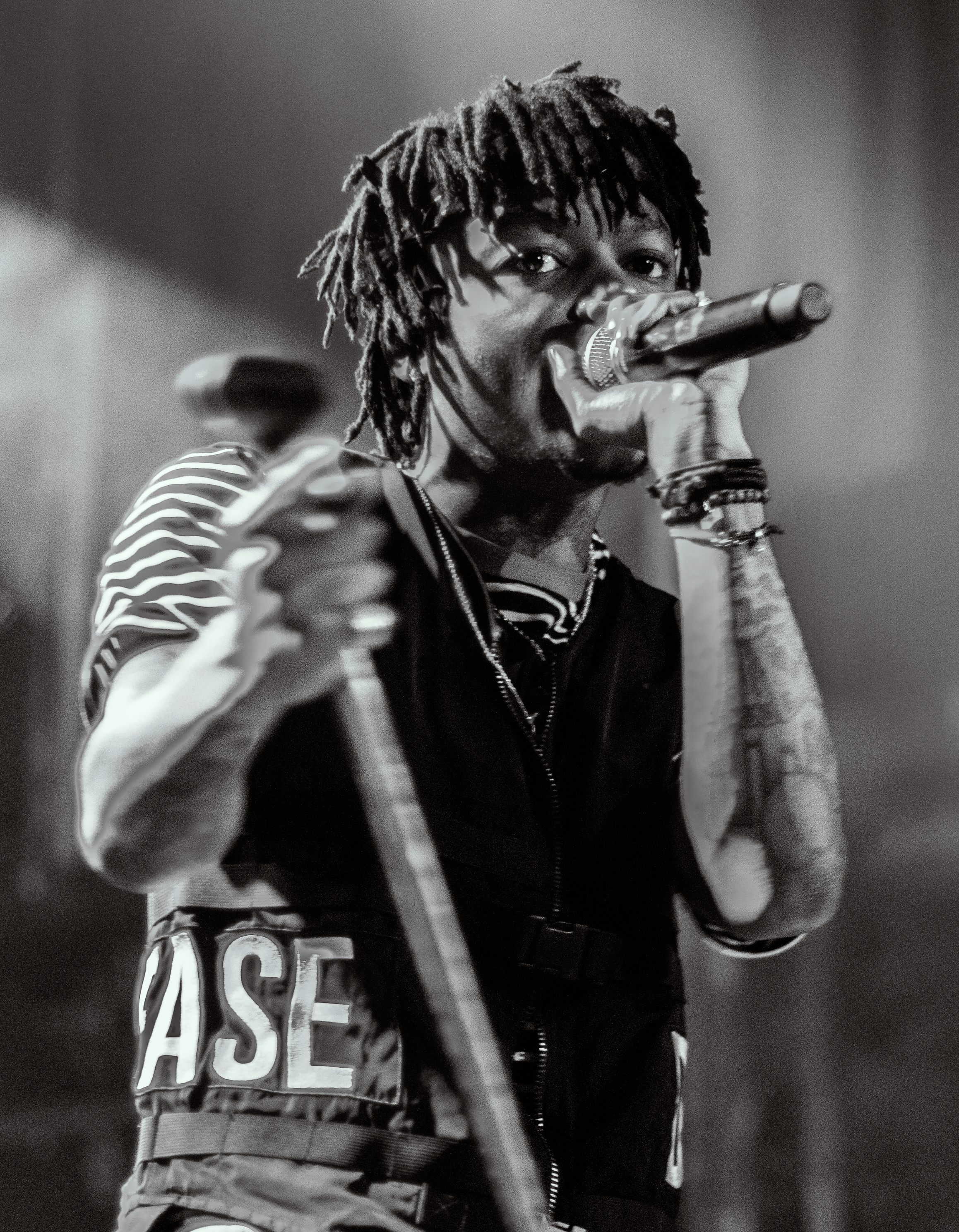
JID in 2017

On February 20, 2017, it was announced that Route had signed to J. Cole's Dreamville label, first releasing the single "Never". The full-length album, The Never Story, was released on March 10, 2017. The album includes guest features from EarthGang, 6LACK, and Mereba, with production by J. Cole, Hollywood JB, Christo, and Childish Major, among others. He later released three more music videos from the album: "D/vision", "Hereditary", and "EdEddnEddy".

He was also an opening act on the North American and European legs of J. Cole's 2017 4 Your Eyez Only Tour. On October 10, JID appeared alongside rappers Cozz, Kodie Shane, and Ali Tomineek in a cypher at the BET Hip Hop Awards. In November 2017, JID co-headlined his Never Had Shit Tour with EarthGang, and guests Lute, Chaz French, and Mereba. It comprised 15 dates in North America, and continued in 2018 with 19 dates in Europe. On December 13, JID appeared on a remix with Foster The People and Saba called "Pay The Man".

=== 2018–2020: DiCaprio 2 ===
In June 2018, JID was featured on the cover of XXL's 2018 Freshman Class. In July, he was featured on Denzel Curry's "Sirens" from Ta13oo, and it was announced he would go on tour with Mac Miller and Thundercat; however, the tour was cancelled due to the passing of Mac Miller. The first single for his second album was released on September 18, titled "151 Rum". On October 3, 2018, JID premiered the song "Working Out" on A COLORS SHOW. On his birthday, his second album, DiCaprio 2, was announced, with a release date of November 26, 2018; the tracklist was revealed shortly after. The album's second official single, "Off Deez" featuring J. Cole, was released on November 6. Other collaborators on the album include A$AP Ferg, 6LACK, Ella Mai, BJ the Chicago Kid, Method Man, and Joey Bada$$, produced largely by his in-house team of Christo, Hollywood JB, J. Cole, and Elite.

DiCaprio 2 was released on November 26, 2018, to positive reviews and critical acclaim. JID announced the first leg of his headlining Catch Me If You Can tour, which included 34 dates, beginning in January 2019. The supporting acts were revealed to be Reason, Hardo, and Lou The Human. On February 9, JID's show in Ithaca, New York, was shut down by the police due to a visible crack forming in the ceiling beneath the show's venue. On February 12, 2019, JID announced the second leg of his Catch Me If You Can tour. The tour included 26 dates that started in May, and featured Saba, Deante' Hitchcock, and Mereba as supporting acts.

In 2019, JID contributed to the Dreamville compilation album Revenge of the Dreamers III. His singles "Down Bad" and "Costa Rica" were certified gold by the RIAA. In 2020, as part of Spillage Village, he was featured on the singles "End of Daze" and "Baptize", for their fourth collective album Spilligion.

=== 2021–2024: The Forever Story and planned Metro Boomin collaborative album ===
JID was featured on the Doja Cat song "Options", part of her Grammy-nominated third album, Planet Her. He later collaborated with Imagine Dragons on the mega-hit "Enemy", which peaked at number five on the Billboard Hot 100 and became his highest-charting song.

JID teased his third album, The Forever Story, throughout 2021. The first and lead single from the album, "Surround Sound" featuring 21 Savage and Baby Tate, was released on January 14, 2022. On March 31, he appeared on the Dreamville compilation D-Day: A Gangsta Grillz Mixtape with the songs "Stick" and "Barry From Simpson". On August 9, JID released the second single from The Forever Story, titled "Dance Now", with Kenny Mason.

The Forever Story was released on August 26, 2022, including guest appearances from Kenny Mason, EarthGang, 21 Savage, Baby Tate, Lil Durk, Ari Lennox, Yasiin Bey, Lil Wayne, Johntá Austin, Ravyn Lenae, and Eryn Allen Kane. On September 8, 2022, JID performed for NPR's Tiny Desk Concert program.

On March 28, 2023, American record producer Metro Boomin posted a picture on Twitter from a studio with JID, alongside the caption "Got a lot of new music coming but when me and @JIDsv drop". JID would later confirm the existence of a collaborative album between the two in a Twitter reply. Though this album (nicknamed "JIDtro" as a portmanteau of its progenitors' names) has yet to release as of August 2026, JID did appear alongside American rapper Offset on "Danger (Spider)" as part of Metro Boomin's soundtrack album for Spiderman: Across the Spider-Verse.

On September 1, 2023 JID released his third EP, titled Blakkboyz present Half Doin Dope/Van Gogh, with features from Lil Yachty and BabyTron. On October 13, JID was featured on Westside Gunn's song "Mamas PrimeTime," along with Conway the Machine, for Gunn's fifth studio album And Then You Pray for Me. On November 9, JID was featured on the opening of the video game Like a Dragon Gaiden: The Man Who Erased His Name.

On July 12, 2024, JID featured on Eminem's song "Fuel" for his twelfth studio album, The Death of Slim Shady (Coup de Grâce). On September 20, 2024, JID also appeared on Katy Perry's song "Artificial" for her seventh studio album 143.

=== 2025-present: God Does Like Ugly ===
On April 18, 2025, JID released the lead single "WRK" for his upcoming fourth studio album, God Does Like Ugly. The song was JID's first solo commercial release since 2022’s The Forever Story. He later announced that the album would be released on August 8, accompanied by a trailer.

On July 4, 2025, JID released GDLU (Preluxe), after announcing it through a freestyle released on YouTube. An EP featuring Eminem, Lil Yachty and 6LACK, it served as a build-up to his upcoming album God Does Like Ugly, which featured four tracks that were meant to be on the album, but were ultimately excluded. His collaboration with Eminem was also released as a single.

God Does Like Ugly released on August 8 through Dreamville and Interscope, featuring guest appearances from Westside Gunn, Clipse, Vince Staples, Ciara, EarthGang, Don Toliver, Ty Dolla Sign, 6lack, Jessie Reyez, Baby Kia, Mereba, and Pastor Troy, to positive reviews. A preluxe edition was released a day later, including all the songs from GDLU (Preluxe).

== Artistry ==
=== Influences ===
Growing up, JID's first connection with music was through his parents' collection of classic funk and soul LPs. He names Lil Wayne, Sly and the Family Stone, D'Angelo, Wu-Tang Clan, Jay-Z, Earl Sweatshirt, and Little Dragon as his biggest influences.

He has also expressed admiration for fellow Atlanta natives OutKast and Goodie Mob, naming them as personal sources of inspiration. He has revealed in interviews that he is from the same area as longtime collaborator Gucci Mane.

== Personal life ==
Route supported Jon Ossoff and Raphael Warnock in the 2020 United States Senate elections, performing at a rally for both in 2020.

Route is a father, which he announced in the closing track of his 2025 album God Does Like Ugly.

== Discography ==
=== Studio albums ===
- The Never Story (2017)
- DiCaprio 2 (2018)
- The Forever Story (2022)
- God Does Like Ugly (2025)

=== Collaborative albums ===
- Revenge of the Dreamers 3 (with Dreamville) (2019)
- Spilligion (with Spillage Village and EarthGang) (2020)
- D-Day: A Gangsta Grillz Mixtape (with Dreamville) (2022)
- God Doesn't Like Ugly (with Metro Boomin) (TBA)

== Tours ==
Headlining

- Never Had Shit Tour (with EarthGang) (2017–18)
- Catch Me If You Can Tour (2019)
- Luv Is 4ever Tour (with Smino) (2023)
- Forever & A Day Tour (2023)
- God Does Like World Tours (2025–26)

Supporting

- Elephant Eyes Tour (Omen) (2015)
- Too High To Riot Tour (Bas) (2016)
- I Told You Tour (Tory Lanez) (2016)
- 4 Your Eyez Only Tour (J. Cole) (2017)
- The Swimming Tour (Mac Miller) (2018; cancelled)
- Confessions of a Dangerous Mind Tour (Logic) (2019)
- American Dream Tour (21 Savage) (2024)

== Awards and nominations ==
Year	Award	Category	Work	Result	Ref.
2020	Grammy Awards	Best Rap Performance	"Down Bad" (with J. Cole, Bas, EarthGang and Young Nudy)	Nominated	
2020	Grammy Awards	Best Rap Album	Revenge of the Dreamers III	Nominated	
2022	Grammy Awards	Album of the Year	Planet Her (Deluxe) (as a featured artist)	Nominated	
2022	Berlin Music Video Awards	Best Cinematography	"Surround Sound"	Nominated	
2023	Berlin Music Video Awards	Best Narrative	"Money"	Nominated	
2026	Grammy Award	Best Melodic Rap Performance	"Wholeheartedly" (with Ty Dolla Sign and 6lack)	Nominated	
2026	Grammy Award	Best Rap Album	God Does Like Ugly	Nominated	
