= Royalty (EP) =

EP by EarthGang
- Released: February 23, 2018
- Recorded: 2016–2017
- Genre: Conscious hip-hop; southern hip-hop; jazz rap
- Length: 24:26
- Label: Spillage Village; Empire
- Producer: J. Cole (exec.); Ibrahim Hamad (exec.); EarthGang; Childish Major; soullooper; 7eptitoff; Like

EarthGang chronology
Robots (2017)	Royalty (2018)	Mirrorland (2019)

Singles from Royalty
- 1. "Nothing but the Best" Released: February 20, 2018

Royalty is the fifth EP by American hip-hop duo EarthGang, and the third of the trilogy with Rags and Robots. It was released on February 16, 2018 by Spillage Village and distributed by Empire Distribution. The EP includes production by Childish Major, and guest appearances from Dreamville's singer Ari Lennox and Spillage Village's Mereba.

== Background ==
EarthGang initially met J. Cole in 2014 while touring with Ab-Soul and was told by their manager that "Cole was feelin' them". Shortly after the release of their 2015 album Strays with Rabies and while touring with Bas in 2016, Dot and Venus began recording a "deconstructed album" which would form the three EP's, leading up to their major-label debut album, Mirrorland.

== Singles and promotion ==
On February 20, 2018, "Nothing was the Best" featuring Ari Lennox was released as they announced the release date of the EP.

== Critical reception ==
Professional ratings
Review scores
Source	Rating
Exclaim!	9/10
HipHopDX	4/5 stars
HotNewHipHop	4.5 stars on a 5 point scale

Upon its release, Royalty received acclaim from critics. Yoh Phillips of DJBooth said "EarthGang's bar for lyricism has always been high, but it’s refreshing to hear more of their personal stories. On Rags and Robots, the duo began to open up to listeners, but on Royalty, they appear as their most transparent selves." Riley Wallace of Exclaim! said "the thick Dirty South production lends to a cohesive project that plays out even better as a solid listen top to bottom than it does as individual tracks. At times it feels as though Chance the Rapper, young Outkast, UGK, and Organized Noise melded together in a melting pot, resulting in the jazzy, laid-back concoctions." Richard Bryan of HotNewHipHop praised the project saying: "Musical experimentation and the technical prowess aside, the complete sense of intentionality and effortlessness exuded throughout is probably the most exciting thing about the EP," and "EarthGang is here to stay, and only time will tell how their styles will continue to evolve. Bring on Mirrorland."

== Track listing ==
No.	Title	Writer(s)	Producer(s)	Length
1.	"Cocktail"	Olu Fann; Eian Parker	EarthGang	3:05
2.	"Skit 1"	Fann; Parker; John Whitfield	EarthGang	1:09
3.	"Build"	Fann; Parker	soullooper; 7eptitoff	3:24
4.	"Nothing but the Best" (featuring Ari Lennox)	Fann; Parker; Marcus Randle; Courtney Salter; Dallas Austin	Childish Major	4:17
5.	"Skit 2"	Fann; Parker; Whitfield	EarthGang	0:58
6.	"Off the Lot" (featuring Mereba)	Fann; Parker; Gabriel Stevenson; Mereba	Like	4:21
7.	"Lolsmh"	Fann; Parker	EarthGang	6:06
8.	"Skit 3"	Fann; Parker; Whitfield	Childish Major; EarthGang	0:58
Total length:				24:26
