= Ghetto Gods =

Studio album by EarthGang
- Released: February 25, 2022
- Recorded: 2020–22
- Genres: Southern hip-hop; soul; funk; R&B; trap
- Length: 53:01
- Labels: Dreamville; Interscope; Spillage Village
- Producers: Kawan Prather (exec.); Barry "Hefner" Johnson (exec.); Zeke Nicholson (exec.); Ace Harris; Carvello; Daoud; Dish; Grandma; Groove; JetsonMade; Latrell James; Najinga; Nami; Natra Average; Nicki Jupiter; Olu; Phoelix; Super Miles; T.Y. Jake; Tane Runo; TBHits; The Breed; Tim Maxey; STLN Drums; Xavi; 1500 or Nothin'

EarthGang chronology
Spilligion (2020)	Ghetto Gods (2022)

Deluxe album cover

Singles from Ghetto Gods
- 1. "American Horror Story" Released: December 8, 2021; 2. "All Eyes On Me" Released: January 14, 2022; 3. "Amen" Released: February 22, 2022

Ghetto Gods is the second studio album by American hip-hop duo EarthGang. It was released on February 25, 2022, by Dreamville, Interscope, and Spillage Village. The album includes guest appearances from Future, JID, J. Cole, Musiq Soulchild, Baby Tate, CeeLo Green, Nick Cannon, and Ari Lennox.

On July 1, 2022, EarthGang released the deluxe edition of the album including features from Wiz Khalifa, Curren$y, Smino, and Blxckie.

== Background ==
On November 3, 2021, EarthGang announced the release date of the album which was originally scheduled for January 28, 2022. However, the album was delayed for four weeks. Instead, the duo allowed fans to hear the album during free live concerts in the US and London, England, before it was officially released.

Olu spoke about the album comparing it to the concept of Mirrorland inspired by The Wiz, saying "This is literally like The Office, where we actually look into the camera every once in a while being like, 'Do you see what's going on?'" WowGr8 said the music on the album represents "absolute certainty," contrasting the album with Spilligion saying "it was a lot of uncertainty. Then, it's being at peace with yourself and comfortable with the known unknown."

== Recording and production ==
The album was executive produced by Kawan Prather, known for his A&R work with Outkast and Dungeon Family. The album was recorded during the COVID-19 pandemic. Olu spoke about the inspiration behind "All Eyes on Me" saying he wanted to "write something that is honest, that people can feel, that people can toast to." The song "Smoke Sum" was recorded amid citywide protests following the murder of George Floyd and the killing of Rayshard Brooks. Olu said the "Strong Friends" is about "the ability and the strength to open up and to be honest, no matter what anybody says or how they respond to your truth."

== Singles and promotion ==
On December 18, 2020, EarthGang released the promotional single "Options" with Wale, and planned on releasing the album in 2021. On May 15, 2021, they released a freestyle over Drake's "Lemon Pepper Freestyle", with Olu rapping "Release date is what I'm waiting on / Interscope gotta crunch the numbers." On May 25, they released a song titled "Aretha", sampling "Bridge Over Troubled Water" by Aretha Franklin. On August 9, the released another song titled "Erykah", sampling "Window Seat" by Erykah Badu. WowGr8 explained the idea of releasing freestyles as tributes saying "In front of our neighborhood, we kind of realized we could tie it in with the Ghetto Gods theme by thematically and very deliberately paying tribute to people that overcame and became icons and legends in their own right. It's a metamorphosis album, so we just celebrate people that metamorphosed in ways that we admire. There's going to be freestyles celebrating those people that we like."

On December 8, 2021, EarthGang released the first official single for the album titled "American Horror Story". On January 14, 2022, the second single titled "All Eyes On Me" was released, accompanied by a music video. The third single, "Amen" featuring Musiq Soulchild was released on February 22, and was premiered on the Apple Music 1 radio show. On the same day, they also announced the Biodeghettable Tour, with Mike Dimes and Pigeons & Planes supporting.

== Critical reception ==
Professional ratings
Aggregate scores
Source	Rating
Metacritic	76/100
Review scores
Source	Rating
Allmusic	3.5/5 stars
Exclaim!	7/10
NME	4/5 stars
Pitchfork	6.5/10
Rolling Stone	3.5/5 stars

Ghetto Gods received generally positive reviews from music critics. At Metacritic, which assigns a normalized rating out of 100 to reviews from mainstream publications, the album received an average score of 76, based on 7 reviews. Marcus Shorter of Consequence said the album "mixes reggae, gospel, funk, R&B, and hip-hop in an eccentric mix that keeps its feet rooted in Atlanta while sounding like, well, EARTHGANG. In the long tradition of ATL emcees, the production is impossible to imitate, because it's a natural extension of their environment. While the subject matter might lend itself to a more somber-sounding affair, the duo defies conventional wisdom."

Writing for NME, Kyann-Sian Williams said "Ghetto Gods finds the Altantans seeking to leave a similar legacy for their city – while staying true to its trap-originating roots. Even more so than its predecessor, 'Ghetto Gods' feels like an homage to Atlanta." Mosi Reeves of Rolling Stone said "EarthGang still sound like they're spreading their wings to embrace the opportunities and challenges that life brings them. But they've also grown reflective, the result of the same political turmoil, pandemic disruptions, and increasing awareness of global injustice that affects everyone's mental health."

== Track listing ==
No.	Title	Writer(s)	Producer(s)	Length
1.	"The Glow"	Olu Fann; Eian Parker		0:45
2.	"Ghetto Gods"	Fann; Parker; Miles Franklin	Super Miles; 1500 or Nothin'; T.Y. Jake	2:46
3.	"Billi" (featuring Future)	Fann; Parker; Nayvadius Wilburn; Lasanna Harris; Ryan Bert	Tane Runo; Olu; Carvello; Ace Harris	2:43
4.	"Waterboyz" (with JID and J. Cole)	Fann; Parker; Destin Route; Jermaine Cole; Benjamin Tolbert; Michael Neil; Daoud Anthony	Groove; Phoelix; Daoud	5:03
5.	"Hey Boo (Skit)"	Fann; Parker; John Whitfield		0:31
6.	"Amen" (with Musiq Soulchild)	Fann; Parker; Taalib Johnson; Dylan Teixeira; Nicolas Barnett; Thomas Brown; Carvin Haggins; Bobby Hebb	TBHits; Olu; Nicki Jupiter; Nami	3:16
7.	"All Eyes on Me"	Fann; Parker; Aaron Rogers; Rashad Johnson; Tahj Morgan; Nigel Sparkes	Olu; The Breed; JetsonMade	4:00
8.	"Lie to Me"	Fann; Parker; Latrell Boyd; Luiz Burnier	Latrell James	4:07
9.	"Jean Interlude (Skit)"	Fann; Parker; Jatavia Johnson; Liam Hall	Grandma; Najinga	0:33
10.	"Black Pearls" (featuring Baby Tate)	Fann; Parker; Tate Farris; Taji Ausar; Courageous Herrera; Thomas Brown	Tane Runo; Xavi; TBHits	3:18
11.	"Neezy's Walk" (featuring Lynae Vanee)	Fann; Parker; Lynae Vanee		0:37
12.	"American Horror Story"	Fann; Parker; Christopher Gibbs	Natra Average	5:09
13.	"Power" (featuring CeeLo Green and Nick Cannon)	Fann; Parker; Thomas Callaway; Nicholas Cannon; Ausar	Olu; Dish; Tane Runo; 1500 or Nothin'	4:33
14.	"Zaza (Skit)"	Fann; Parker; John Whitfield		0:42
15.	"Smoke Sum"	Fann; Parker; Ausar; Jalissa "Jaylii" Caine; Jessica Hampton; Chassidy Joiner	Tane Runo	4:54
16.	"Strong Friends"	Fann; Parker; Nandish Patel	Dish	4:39
17.	"Run Too" (with Ari Lennox)	Fann; Parker; Courtney Salter; Timothy Maxey; Ausar; Christopher Wikes	STLN Drums; Olu; Tim Maxey; Tane Runo	5:18
Total length:				53:01

Deluxe edition
No.	Title	Producer(s)	Length
18.	"Smoke Sum (Remix)" (featuring Wiz Khalifa & Curren$y)	Tane Runo	5:05
19.	"Black Pearls OG"	Tane Runo	3:05
20.	"American Horror Story OG"	Natra Average	5:12
21.	"Lvl'd Up"	Big Korey; Olu; SK808	4:21
22.	"Ambeyoncé" (featuring Smino)	Monte Booker; Groove; Sam Wish	3:21
23.	"Billi (Remix)" (featuring Blxckie)	Lasanna "ACE" Harris; Carvello; Olu; Tane Runo	2:43

Notes

- All tracks are stylized in all caps.
- "The Glow" contains vocals form 2 Chainz
- "Hey Boo (Skit)" and "Zaza (Skit)" contains vocals from D.C. Young Fly
- "Amen" samples "Just Friends (Sunny)" performed by Musiq Soulchild which he also features on.

== Personnel ==
Technical

- Kawan Prather − executive producer
- Barry "Hefner" Johnson − executive producer
- Zeke Nicholson − executive producer
- Colin Leonard − mastering engineer (all tracks)
- Derek "MixedByAli" Ali − mixing engineer (all tracks)
- Leslie Brathwaite − mixing engineer (all tracks)
- Ya Boy N.O.I.S. − mixing engineer (all tracks)
- Timon Adams − recording engineer (all tracks)
- Fred Foster − creative design

== Charts ==
Chart performance for Ghetto Gods
Chart (2022)	Peak position
US Billboard 200	114
