= Alemeda =

- Born: Rahema Shifa Alameda; December 13, 1999 (age 26); Ethiopia
- Origin: Phoenix, Arizona
- Genres: Alternative rock; indie rock; pop
- Instrument: Vocals
- Years active: 2020–present
- Labels: Top Dawg; Warner

Rahema Shifa Alameda (born 13 December 1999), known mononymously as Alemeda, is an American singer-songwriter. She is signed to Top Dawg Entertainment and Warner Records.

== Early life ==
Alemeda was born in Ethiopia and raised in Phoenix, Arizona. Her father was born in Sudan, and her mother in the United States. Her stage name stems from her last name, Alameda, which she said is a "common name in the Gurage tribe in Ethiopia," of which her grandfather was a part. She changed the spelling to "Alemeda" to be more easily found online. Growing up in a strict household, she was "alienated from music until the age of 10." Describing herself as a "heavy Disney pop-punk kid" growing up, she was inspired to make music by High School Musical.

== Career ==
Her music blends "hyper-contemporary aesthetics with nostalgic R&B vibes" and explores themes of love and relationships. In 2020, she appeared on "Slow Down", a song from the 2020 album New Beginnings by American rapper Reason.

She independently released a drum and bass song called "Gonna Bleach My Eyebrows" as her debut single in 2021. She garnered popularity with it on TikTok, but stated it would probably be her only drum and bass song, as she later began adopting more of a pop, alternative rock, and indie sound in her music.

In 2022, she released "Post Nut Clarity". Also in 2022, she made guest appearances on Capacity to Love and Herbert, albums by Ibrahim Maalouf and Ab-Soul, respectively.

In May 2023, she released "Ur So Full of It". In July, she released "First Love Song". She was spotlighted in a World Cafe playlist for Black History Month in 2024. In February 2024, she released "Don't Call Me", of which Consequence of Sound writer Mary Siroky stated that "the air of riot and revolution [...] feels authentically cathartic". On September 20, Alemeda was announced as the new signee to the Top Dawg Entertainment (TDE) label, being signed in collaboration with Warner Records. Her debut EP FK IT was released the same day. She released "Beat A B!tch Up", featuring TDE-label mate Doechii, as the debut single for her EP But What The Hell Do I Know in October 2025. She is scheduled to support Isaiah Rashad's Lil Sunny's Awful Road Trip Tour in 2026.

== Discography ==
=== Extended plays ===
- FK IT (2024)
- But What The Hell Do I Know (2025)
