= Childish =

Childish describes something suitable for a child, or something (particularly behavior) that is immature. It may also refer to:

- Billy Childish (born 1959), English artist, writer, and musician
- Childish Gambino (born 1983), American actor, writer, comedian, director, and musician
- Childish Major (born 1991), American rapper and record producer

== See also ==
- Minor (law)
