= Robots (EP) =

EP by EarthGang
- Released: October 20, 2017
- Recorded: 2015–2017
- Genre: Conscious hip-hop; southern hip-hop; neo-soul
- Length: 21:20
- Label: Spillage Village; Empire
- Producer: J. Cole (exec.); Ibrahim Hamad (exec.); Anonxmous; Groove; Johnny Venus; Insightful; Swish

EarthGang chronology
| Rags (2017) | Robots (2017) | Royalty (2018) |

Singles from Robots
- 1. "Robots" Released: October 19, 2017

Robots is the fourth EP by American hip-hop duo EarthGang, released October 20, 2017 by Spillage Village and distributed by Empire Distribution. Released as a sequel to their third EP Rags, it is the second instalment in a trilogy of EPs, leading up to their debut album, Mirrorland. The EP features production from Swish, Groove, Anonxmous, Insightful, and Johnny Venus. It features a guest appearance from SiR.

== Background ==
EarthGang initially met J. Cole in 2014 while touring with Ab-Soul and was told by their manager that "Cole was feelin' them". Shortly after the release of their 2015 album Strays with Rabies and while touring with Bas in 2016, Dot and Venus began recording a "deconstructed album" which would form the three EPs, leading up to their major-label debut album, Mirrorland.

== Singles and promotion ==
On October 6, 2017, EarthGang released the first single "Robots" and announced the release date for the EP. On October 19, 2017 EarthGang released the music video for "Robots".

== Critical reception ==
Robots has received generally positive reviews. In a positive review for HotNewHipHop, Mitch Findlay wrote: "Dare I say reminiscent of a new-age OutKast. There's no denying that Atlanta is running the game, but EarthGang is quietly making a case that the lyricists having something to say. Writing for The Lunchtable Talks, Williams Rivas said, "The EP is a strong show of what the future holds for EarthGang. Vulnerability, musical prowess, a respect for hip-hop and R&B roots, and an unmatchable chemistry. Since the group’s inception, to their time with Spillage Village, to their present status under the wing of one of the current greatest rappers in the game, Johnny Venus and Doctur Dot are perfecting their craft with each and every venture". Pitchfork wrote a positive review of the EP and praised "Flickted" as the project's standout track, calling it "an expansive, glistening wash of electric piano infuses their rhymes with warmth and optimism".

== Track listing ==
| No. | Title | Writer(s) | Producer(s) | Length |
|---|---|---|---|---|
| 1. | "Lyfted Intro" | Olu. O Fann; Eian Undrai Parker; John Whitfield | | 1:01 |
| 2. | "Artificial" | Fann; Parker | Swish | 4:20 |
| 3. | "Robots" | Fann; Parker | Anonxmous | 4:39 |
| 4. | "Underwater" (featuring SiR) | Fann; Parker; Sir Darryl Farris | Insightful | 2:54 |
| 5. | "So Many Feelings" | Fann; Parker | Anonxmous | 3:32 |
| 6. | "Flickted" | Fann; Parker | Johnny Venus; Groove | 5:23 |
| Total length: | | | | 21:20 |
