= There You Have It =

There You Have It may refer to:

- "There You Have It" (song), a 1998 song by Blackhawk
- There You Have It (album), a 2017 album by Reason
