= Mirrorland =

Studio album by EarthGang
- Released: September 6, 2019
- Recorded: 2015–2019
- Genres: Southern hip-hop; funk; soul; jazz rap; neo soul
- Length: 55:20
- Labels: Dreamville; Interscope; Spillage Village
- Producers: J. Cole (also exec.); Ibrahim Hamad (exec.); Ant Chambers; Big Korey; Bink; Brian Malik Baptiste; Childish Major; Christo; D.K. the Punisher; DJ Dahi; DJ Khalil; Dre; Edsclusive; Elite; Groove; Lido; Natra Average; Olu; Pete Nebula; Rahki; Ron Gilmore; VOU

EarthGang chronology
Royalty (2018)	Mirrorland (2019)	Spilligion (2020)

Singles from Mirrorland
- 1. "Stuck" Released: September 21, 2018; 2. "Proud of U" Released: February 5, 2019; 3. "UP" Released: August 30, 2019

Mirrorland is the major label debut studio album by American hip-hop duo EarthGang, released on September 6, 2019, by Dreamville, Interscope, and Spillage Village. The album includes features from Young Thug, T-Pain, Kehlani, Arin Ray, and Malik. The production of the album was handled by a variety of producers including Olu, J. Cole, Elite, Ron Gilmore, Christo, Bink, DJ Dahi, Childish Major and Groove, among others.

== Background ==
While touring in 2016, EarthGang began conceptualizing a "deconstructed album" which would form the three EPs, leading up to their major label debut album, Mirrorland. The trilogy: Rags, Robots, and Royalty were released between 2017 and 2018. EarthGang describes the album as a "cinematic musical experience filled with delectation and delight."

In an interview with Pitchfork, Olu said the album is inspired by The Wiz, the 1978 film adaptation of the Broadway musical based on The Wonderful Wizard of Oz.

We thought about how, if we're going to make a project sonically to rival The Wiz, we got to create another world for people to imagine and go to. You know when Dorothy got swept away and she met the Munchkins? That was such a beautiful thing. You could see Quincy Jones on the piano, just playing away. That's what "La La Challenge" is about. Right now, that's the intro to the whole record. It's really colorful. It's really dangerous. It's really trippy. It's literally Freaknik Atlanta in the summertime—folks riding around in cars with big rims with paint on their faces.

== Recording and production ==
On the album's opener, "LaLa Challenge", Olu says in his verse, "I been writing this album damn way too long." That song was recorded about halfway through completing Mirrorland, and it represented the frustration they had on the album's long-awaited release. In late 2015, EarthGang joined Mac Miller on the GO:OD AM tour, where WowGr8 was informed about the death of a longtime friend of his, who was killed attempting a robbery. The night they created the song "Swivel", they were sleeping on the floor in Bink's garage studio. It became one of the first songs they played for J. Cole before signing to Dreamville, and Cole suggested they hold the song for an album. As the song grew and changed like the rest of the album, it first appeared on Revenge of the Dreamers III.

None of songs from the recording sessions of the Dreamville compilation made it on Mirrorland, Olu mentioned that it "opened up the creative space" as they continued to work on the album. "Top Down" was inspired from those sessions in Atlanta "because you can feel how the momentum was still there from the sessions where everybody just wanted to continue to [collaborate] and to be around one another in the studio." Although Cole isn't featured on the album, he played a direct and abstract role in the album's creation. "Tequila" was recorded at his North Carolina studio The Sheltuh. In an interview with Vibe, WowGr8 said "We studied soundtracks and scores, not in any attempts to end up on anybody's movie, but just in an attempt to make a project that feels like a movie."

== Release and promotion ==
=== Singles ===
On September 4, 2018, EarthGang premiered the song "UP" on the Berlin platform Colors Studio. On September 21, they released a single titled "Stuck" featuring Arin Ray. On February 5, 2019, they released the second single "Proud of U" featuring Young Thug. The song "Swivel" was released on Dreamville's compilation album Revenge of the Dreamers III on July 5, as a preview of the album. On August 30, they officially released the single "UP". On September 2, they announced the release date of the album and released the promotional single "Ready to Die".

=== Tours ===
On September 5, the duo launched a mobile video game named after the album. EarthGang went on a 20-date "What On Earth" Tour in Europe from September to October, and announced the first leg of the "Welcome to Mirrorland" Tour in North America, with Guapdad 4000, Duckwrth, and Benji. In December, they announced a short Australian "Down Under" Tour.

== Critical reception ==
Professional ratings
Aggregate scores
Source	Rating
Metacritic	79/100
Review scores
Source	Rating
Exclaim!	7/10
HipHopDX	4.1/5 stars
NME	4/5 stars
Paste	7.5/10
Pitchfork	7.2/10

Mirrorland received generally positive reviews; aggregating website Metacritic reports a normalized rating of 79, based on 5 reviews. Jewel Wicker of Pitchfork called the album EarthGang's most cohesive project to date, saying "Mirrorland seduces listeners into the eclectic world of these two Atlanta dreamers. This is most apparent on the bulbous funk of "Wings", where Olu name-drops local landmarks including Hartsfield-Jackson Airport, Interstate 85, and the Georgia Dome." She continued to write that the album "is a vivid ode to Southern black culture. Where the scratchy electric guitars in "Blue Moon" channel the region's soul and blues lineage, "Trippin" pays homage to turn-of-the-century R&B acts like Ginuwine. Elsewhere, standout "La La Challenge" shows the duo's restless curiosity as it twists and turns through Lil Wayne references, hip-hop minimalism, and an extended outro that brings to mind a fiery gospel service." Writing for DJBooth, Yoh Phillips gave a positive review of the album saying "EarthGang not only wrote an album, but they also wrote a love letter. A letter to their blackness, to their musical roots, and to the city that raised them. The album represents EarthGang, an exhibition of their talents, and a glimpse into their world as they see it. Olu and WowGr8 avoid the allure of being anyone else, confident in their cool; comfortable with their weird."

NME gave the album a four of five star rating saying "Johnny Venus and Doctur Dot prove to everyone that rap groups are on the rise. In a genre overpopulated with solo artists, it's refreshing to see a duo emerge from the ashes. If you give the sick lyricism and jazz overtones a few more years, they could be the next Outkast." Aaron Williams of Uproxx wrote a favorable review of the album saying "Mirrorland doesn't quite paint a picture of a new place as it does thoroughly explain Earthgang's unique outlook — and the history and locations that influenced it." The writer continued to say "it's just the way Earthgang sees Atlanta, through their own wavy lenses and strange sensibilities. It's also a strong argument that they're a worthy successor to Atlanta's inescapable, inimitable legacy."

== Commercial performance ==
The album sold 11,856 album-equivalent units in the first week, debuting at number 40 on the US Billboard 200 chart and number 22 on the US Top R&B/Hip-Hop Albums chart.

== Track listing ==
No.	Title	Writer(s)	Producer(s)	Length
1.	"LaLa Challenge"	Olu Fann; Eian Parker; Peter Losnegård	Lido; Olu; J. Cole^{[a]}	3:51
2.	"UP"	Fann; Parker; Edward Davadi; Ugur Tig	VOU; Edsclusive	3:35
3.	"Top Down"	Fann; Parker; Markus Randle	Childish Major	3:16
4.	"Bank"	Fann; Parker; Anthony Phillips; Korey Roberson	Big Korey; Ant Chambers	3:00
5.	"Proud of U" (featuring Young Thug)	Fann; Parker; Jeffery Williams; Mateo Arias	Olu	3:58
6.	"This Side"	Fann; Parker; Christopher Gibbs	Natra Average; Olu	4:37
7.	"Swivel"	Fann; Parker; Roosevelt Harrell	Bink!	3:14
8.	"Avenue"	Fann; Parker; Dacoury Natche	DJ Dahi; Ron Gilmore^{[a]}	3:04
9.	"Tequila" (featuring T-Pain)	Fann; Parker; Anthony Parino; Faheem Najm	Elite	4:33
10.	"Blue Moon"	Fann; Parker; Tyran Donaldson	Pete Nebula; Ron Gilmore^{[a]}	3:58
11.	"Trippin" (featuring Kehlani)	Fann; Parker; John Welch; Benjamin Tolbert; Kehlani Parrish	Groove; Christo; Olu	4:18
12.	"Stuck" (featuring Arin Ray)	Fann; Armando Chaverri; Brian Malik Baptiste; Daniel Seeff; Parrino; Sam Barsh; Khalil Abdul-Rahman Hazzard; Ron Gilmore; Arin Ray	Elite; Brian Malik Baptiste; DJ Khalil^{[a]}; Ron Gilmore^{[a]}	4:30
13.	"Fields" (featuring Malik)	Fann; Parker; Keith Askey; Columbus T. Smith III; Baptiste	Rahki; Ron Gilmore^{[a]}; Armando Chaverri	5:19
14.	"Wings"	Fann; Parker; Donovan Knight; Andre Harris	D.K. the Punisher; Dre	4:07
Total length:				55:20

Notes

- ^{^[a]} signifies an additional producer
- "This Side" contains additional vocals from Mereba
- "Fields" contains additional vocals from BJ the Chicago Kid

Sample credits

- "Proud of U" contains a sample of "Really Rong" performed by ¿Teo?
- "UP" contains an interpolation of "Lady Marmalade" performed by Labelle and "Blue Suede Shoes" performed by Elvis Presley

== Personnel ==
Instrumentation

- Nate Jones − bass (tracks 1, 9)
- Tim Maxey − organ (tracks 1, 11)
- Jasminfire − strings (track 9)
- Yuli − strings (track 9)
- Rasheeda Ali − flute (track 10)
- Swayyvo − saxophone (track 10)
- Dorran Thigpen − trumpet (track 10)
- Olu − guitar (track 11)

Technical

- Juro "Mez" Davis − mixing (tracks 1−4, 6−11, 13, 14)
- Joe LaPorta − mastering (tracks 1−4, 6−14)
- Julio Ulloa − assistant mixing (tracks 1, 3, 4, 6, 8−11, 13, 14)
- Lido − recording (track 1)
- Shaan Singh − recording (track 5)
- Alex Tumay − mixing (track 5)
- Chris Athens − mastering (track 5)
- E. Dan (ID Labs) − mixing (track 12)

== Charts ==
Chart (2019)	Peak position
Canadian Albums (Billboard)	81
US Billboard 200	40
