= Lynae Vanee =

American poet, educator, and social media influencer

- Vanee at Essence Festival of Culture 2026 in New Orleans
- Born: Lynae Vanee Bogues; Atlanta, Georgia, U.S.
- Education: Spelman College (BA); Boston University (MA)
- Occupations: Poet, educator, social media influencer

Lynae Vanee Bogues is an American poet, educator, and social media influencer. She became famous through her Parking Lot Pimpin' clips on platforms such as Instagram and TikTok. She is currently the host of The People's Brief as part of Revolt's podcast network. She is the winner of the NAACP Image Awards for the Outstanding Digital Content Creator – Political/Culture category in 2026. She was previously nominated for Outstanding Media Personality of the Year for the 54th and 55th NAACP Image Awards.

== Biography ==
=== Early life & education ===
Vanee is from the Atlanta, Georgia area. Her mother came from Mississippi; her father is from North Carolina. Vanee also has Gullah Geechee origins. She was raised in the Baptist church.

Vanee graduated with a Bachelor's degree in Psychology from Spelman College in 2016. She later earned a Master's degree in African American studies from Boston University. Before becoming a social media influencer, she taught high school history and extracurriculars, often incorporating Black history. She quit teaching in September 2020 and began to pursue her creative works after the start of the COVID-19 pandemic and the George Floyd protests. Among her inspirations were her godmother Quinyan Goodlove, Issa Rae, and Beyoncé's 2016 album Lemonade.

=== 2020–2023: Parking Lot Pimpin' & career growth ===
Vanee began posting her Parking Lot Pimpin' series on Instagram and TikTok around 2020 and later became acclaimed for her series, which explores topics such as Black culture, Black history, and current events, as well as political and cultural issues. The same year, she began to write episodes for the Black American History series on Crash Course. In 2021, she was featured on "Neezy's Walk" by EarthGang, on their album Ghetto Gods.

By 2023, her videos had reached over 70 million views on social media platforms. Parking Lot Pimpin' later was spun off into other series, including Drive In around 2023, which hosted various guests, including Daveed Diggs. Around this time, she also released a video series on YouTube titled The Let Out, as well as the podcast Femme Time. She was honored as one of the personalities listed on TikTok's Visionary Voice list in 2023. Her aim with her content is to highlight Black stories and repair Black communities.

Vanee has partnered with Kamala Harris and Barack and Michelle Obama. Vanee also met and interviewed Harris in 2023 to discuss gun violence. She has also collaborated with various companies such as Target, Nike, and Indeed.

She appeared on The Cross Connection with Tiffany Cross and on Yearly Departed, as well as publications such as the Los Angeles Times and Bustle. Vanee was featured on the 2023 documentary Stamped from the Beginning.

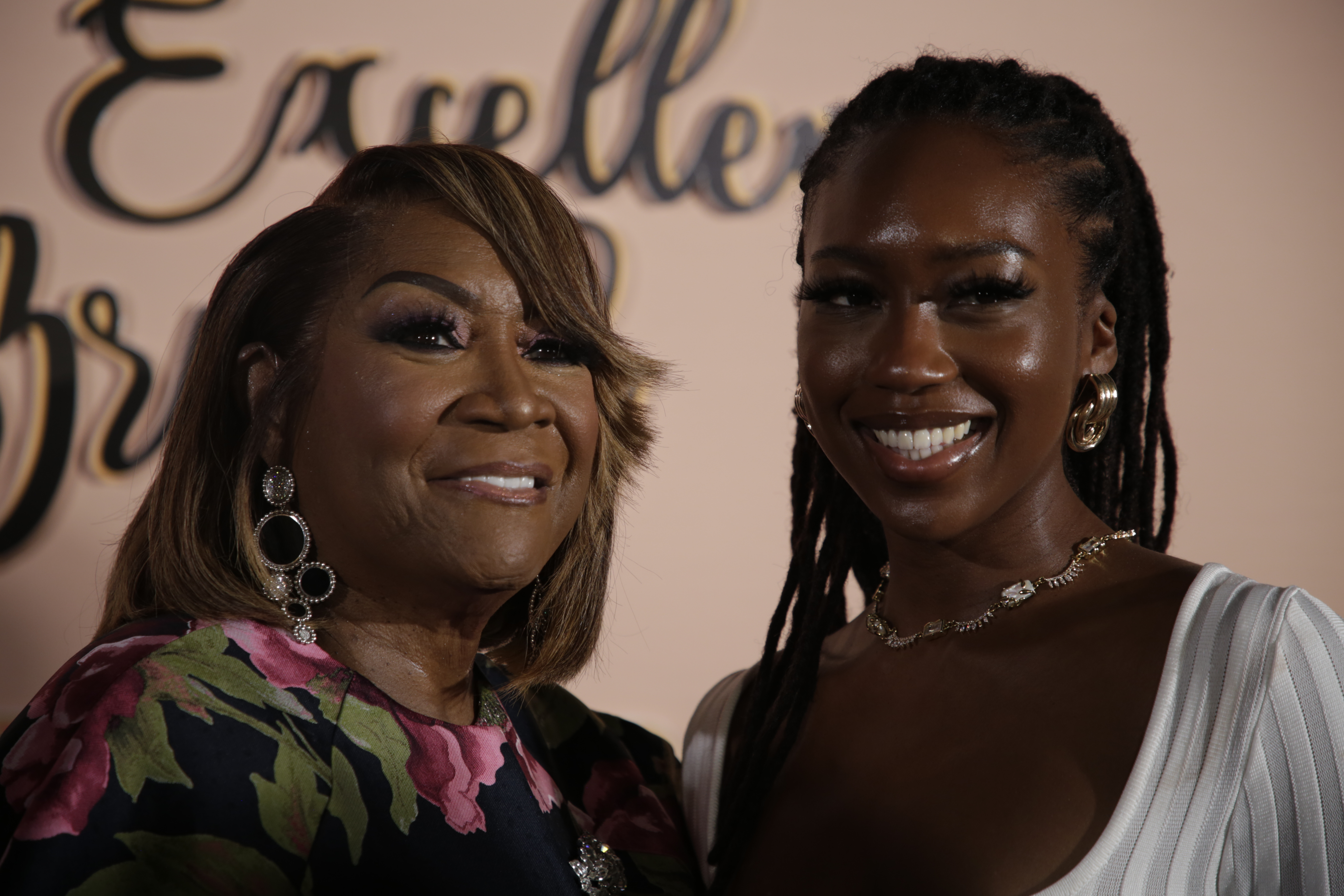
Vanee with Patti Labelle at the Black Excellence Brunch 2026 in New Orleans.

=== 2024–present: Tours & The People's Brief ===
In 2024, she launched her own self-care brand, VANE, as a homage to her rituals and Gullah Geechee roots, as well as a way to "reclaim that concept of vanity". She also developed a tea brand in that time period.

In May 2025, she started her series The People's Brief on Revolt's podcast network, which tackles topics relating to the African-American community and hosts interviews with notable figures. Vanee has described the show as having a variety show format. The title came from both lyrics from the Chance the Rapper song "Blessings (Reprise)" and Thomas Paine's Common Sense.

She appeared on a May 2025 episode of The Breakfast Club. She was later featured on the September 2025 cover for Rolling Out. In October 2025, she was the keynote speaker at the Black New England Conference (BNEC), held at Southern New Hampshire University (SNHU) in Nashua, New Hampshire.

She has been touring as part of her Black Women Deserve Poems tour starting in July 2026. This included stops in Chicago in July, where she was joined by Fred Hampton Jr., as well as stops in Dallas, Los Angeles, New York City, Philadelphia, Portland, Oregon, San Francisco, and Washington, D.C. During the tour, she also screened her short film Sundays in the Overflow.

She is currently signed to Issa Rae's agency ColorCreative.

=== Awards & recognitions ===
For her work with the series and with other social media projects, she was nominated for the Outstanding Media Personality of the Year award for the 54th and 55th NAACP Image Awards. She won the Outstanding Digital Content Creator – Political/Culture award at the 56th NAACP Image Awards.
