= Spilligion =

Studio album by Spillage Village, JID & EarthGang
- Released: September 25, 2020
- Recorded: 2020
- Genres: Southern hip-hop; soul; funk; R&B; gospel; neo soul
- Length: 49:45
- Labels: Dreamville; Interscope; SinceThe80s
- Producers: Benji; Chesley Ova; Christo; Elite; Giszm; Hollywood JB; Jay Card; Khirye Tyler; Malik; Mesita; Mike Dean; Monte Booker; Nice Rec; Nicki Jupiter; Quintin Gulledge; Rance; Rascal; Sounwave; Olu; William Greene; 1500 or Nothin'

Spillage Village chronology
Bears Like This Too Much (2016)	Spilligion (2020)

JID chronology
DiCaprio 2 (2018)	Spilligion (2020)	The Forever Story (2022)

EarthGang chronology
Mirrorland (2019)	Spilligion (2020)	Ghetto Gods (2022)

Singles from Spilligion
- 1. "End of Daze" Released: June 11, 2020; 2. "Baptize" Released: September 10, 2020; 3. "Hapi" Released: September 22, 2020

Spilligion is the major label debut album by American hip-hop collective Spillage Village, headed by JID and EarthGang, released on September 25, 2020, by Dreamville, Interscope, and SinceThe80s. The collective consists of EarthGang, JID, Hollywood JB, Jurdan Bryant, Mereba, 6lack, and Benji. The album features guest appearances from Ant Clemons, Ari Lennox, Buddy, Chance the Rapper, Masego, Lucky Daye, and Big Rube. The production was primarily handled by in-house producers Olu, Benji, Christo, and Hollywood JB, with outside producers Nice Rec, Jay Card, Monte Booker, and Elite, among others.

The album incorporates elements of soul, funk, contemporary R&B, gospel, neo soul, folk, and jazz. Concepts explored in the album include religion, spirituality, apocalypticism, love, African-American culture, and social activism.

== Background ==
Spilligion is the fourth overall collaborative album by the collective, following the Bears Like This trilogy. The album title was announced in March, 2020. Spillage Village began with members EarthGang, JID, Hollywood JB, and Jurdan Bryant, while adding Mereba and 6lack later in 2014. In 2020, they announced the latest addition of Benji, who is the younger brother of the affiliated producer Christo. EarthGang rapper WowGr8 says Spillage Village projects are "like a time capsule. We do one and all go off and work on what we want to work on and then we come back and do another one. We see how much the music has evolved from the time we were apart to the time we come back together each time. We're all way more mature and writing about reflections on the times around us right now. This is more in tune socially because we got the chance to sit down and make this project together." Speaking to Rolling Stone in 2022, WowGr8 said “Spilligion is reflective of when you first experienced the pandemic. I’m talking about the end of days. That’s what a lot of people felt in the beginning. It was a lot of uncertainty. Then, it’s being at peace with yourself and comfortable with the known unknown.”

== Recording and production ==
In March 2020, JID rented the Spillage Village studio house in Atlanta to record his third solo album, with members of the group expected make appearances. Due to the COVID-19 pandemic, the studio became a safe place to be stationary, and they decided to record the collective instead. Each group member lived in the studio home for more than two months due to self-quarantine rules in Atlanta, with the exception of 6lack who was in Los Angeles and participated remotely, and Mereba who was present at the studio but returned home after the album was complete.

EarthGang wrote on social media about the album's recording sessions, saying "the quarantine has made it happen". In April, Olu said in an interview "the first couple of weeks everybody was together and you can just feel the vibes". WowGr8 also elaborated, saying "every time we do one of these projects we become progressively busier as artists and we're all over the world. When we first started conceptualizing this project, we didn't know how possible it would be because we didn't know if everybody would have time. It's like the universe gave us time because we were talking about it." Mereba stated that the album's creation developed from a natural camaraderie of pushing each other as a group.

== Artwork ==
On September 8, Spillage Village unveiled the artwork designed by in-house artist Fred Lozano, who was in charge of the creative design and direction for DiCaprio 2 and Mirrorland.

== Singles and promotion ==
On June 11, they released the single "End of Daze". The official music video was directed by Caleb Seales with the in-house production company Opn Szn. On September 10, the second single "Baptize" was released featuring Ant Clemons. "Hapi" was released as the album's third single on September 22, 2020.

== Critical reception ==
Professional ratings
Review scores
Source	Rating
AllMusic	4/5 stars
Pitchfork	6.9/10

Spilligion received generally positive reviews. Rolling Stone writer Grant Ridner described the album as "an album filled equally with uplifting, soulful melodies and contemplative bars about day-to-day reality in 2020. It comes as close as any album made in quarantine to capturing the messiness of this chaotic, bleak year." He continued to write that the album sounds like "what you might imagine happens when seven distinct voices share a space and lean on one another to process the events of an uncertain world." Complex illustrated the album as "music that blurs the lines between Atlanta trap, neo-soul, R&B, and folk music, a gamble that resulted in the most holistic music of their career."

Aaron Williams of Uproxx said the album "draws from across Americana, especially Black traditions like jazz and gospel, fusing them with folksy banjo and out-of-tune pianos to suggest simpler times and echo the sentimental rhapsodizing of the group's members." He continued to say "Spilligion is richer, more expansive, and more surprising than its predecessor." Fred Thomas of AllMusic said the album "is a boundless synthesis of styles and ideas that never gets too serious. Even at an uncommonly high level of social commentary, intricate production, and risk-taking songwriting choices, the songs remain warm, listenable, and communicative." Writing for Pitchfork, Pete Tosiello said the style is "reminiscent of Goodie Mob, OutKast, and blues" saying, "Spillage Village seems to understand what makes Dungeon Family transcendent, that their essence can't be condensed to a vibe." He continued to write "Spilligion is a polished record full of rumbling basslines, posse cuts, and gospel interludes, with songs assuming loose themes of love, faith, family, and weed."

=== Accolades ===
Publication	List	Rank	Ref.
Complex	The Best Albums of 2020	43	
The Fader	The 50 best albums of 2020	20	
Hip Hop Golden Age	The Best Hip Hop Albums Of 2020	31	
Magnetic Magazine	30 Best Albums of 2020	29	
Mondo Sonoro	Best Albums of 2020	12	
NPR Music	The 50 Best Albums of 2020	5	
Uproxx	The Best Albums Of 2020	3	

== Track listing ==
Spilligion track listing
No.	Title	Writer(s)	Producer(s)	Length
1.	"Spill Vill" (featuring Desi Banks, Big Rube and Kountry Wayne)	Desi Banks; John Welch; Olu Fann; Ruben Bailey; Wayne Colley	Olu; Christo	2:08
2.	"Baptize" (with JID and EarthGang featuring Ant Clemons)	Fann; Eian Parker; Destin Route; Justin Bryant; John Welch	Christo; Olu; Hollywood JB	4:55
3.	"PsalmSing" (with Mereba)	Marian Mereba; Fann; Ian Welch; Justin Bryant; Nicolas Barnett	Benji.; Olu; Hollywood JB; Nicki Jupiter^{[a]}	3:54
4.	"Ea'alah (Family)" (with JID and EarthGang featuring Hollywood JB)	Route; Parker; Justin Bryant; Fann; Tobias Breuer	Rascal; Sounwave; Olu^{[b]}; Hollywood JB^{[b]}	4:01
5.	"Mecca" (with EarthGang and JID)	Route; Parker; I. Welch; J. Welch; Fann; Peter Mudge	Olu; Benji.; Nice Rec; Christo	4:50
6.	"Judas" (with JID featuring Ari Lennox, Buddy, Chance the Rapper and Masego)	Ahmanti Booker; Chancellor Bennett; Courtney Salter; Route; James Paul Cooley; Micah Davis; Simmie Sims III	Monte Booker; Mesita^{[a]}	3:09
7.	"Oshun" (with EarthGang and 6lack featuring Hollywood JB)	Parker; I. Welch; Jordan Bryant; Justin Bryant; Fann; Ricardo Valentine Jr.; William Greene	Olu; Hollywood JB; Christo; Chesley Ova^{[a]}; Benji.; William Greene	4:02
8.	"Cupid" (with EarthGang and 6lack featuring Lucky Daye)	Brian Malik Baptiste; David Brown; Fann; Valentine Jr.; Larrance Dopson; Khirye Tyler; Quintin Gulledge	1500 or Nothin'; Malik; Quintin Gulledge; Khirye Tyler; Rance	4:02
9.	"Shiva" (with JID and EarthGang featuring Benji and Jurdan Bryant)	Route; Parker; I. Welch; Jordan Bryant; Olu Fann	Hollywood JB; Benji.; Olu^{[a]}; Giszm^{[b]}	4:20
10.	"End of Daze" (with EarthGang and JID featuring Jurdan Bryant, Mereba and Hollywood JB)	Fann; Parker; Route; Mereba; Jordan Bryant; Justin Bryant; Jackson Card; Peter Mudge; John Welch; Michael Dean; Anthony Parrino	Jay Card; Nice Rec; Olu; Mike Dean; Christo; Elite	5:32
11.	"Hapi" (with Benji and EarthGang featuring Mereba and Big Rube)	Parker; Welch; Fann; Mereba; Bailey	Benji.; Olu	6:25
12.	"Jupiter" (with Mereba and JID featuring EarthGang, Hollywood JB and Jurdan Bryant)	Fann; Parker; Route; Mereba; Jordan Bryant; Justin Bryant; Nicolas Barnett	Benji.; Olu; Hollywood JB; Nicki Jupiter^{[a]}	2:27
Total length:				49:45

Notes

- ^{^[a]} signifies a co-producer
- ^{^[b]} signifies an additional producer
- "Baptize" features vocals from Luke James and Gallant
- "PsalmSing" features additional vocals from Benji, Hero the Band, JID, Mereba, and Olu
- "Hapi" features background vocals from JID, Najinga Luster, and Rashida Chitunda
- "Jupiter" features background vocals from Nicki Jupiter

== Personnel ==
Credits adapted from Tidal.

Instrumentation

- Benji – bass (tracks 3, 5, 7, 9, 11, 12)
- Christo – drums (track 5)
- Nicki Jupiter – drums, guitar (track 12)
- Olu – keyboard (tracks 3, 5), guitar (track 5)
- Mereba – guitar (track 3)
- Jay Card – keyboard (track 10)

Recording engineers

- MixedByAli – mixing engineer (all tracks)
- Ya Boy N.O.I.S. – mixing engineer (track 2)
- Curtis "Sircut" Bye – assistant mixing engineer (tracks 1, 3-12)
- Dave Kutch – mastering engineer (all tracks)
- Raul Chirinos – studio personnel

== Charts ==
Chart (2020)	Peak position
US Billboard 200	141
