= The Breeze Grew a Fire =

Studio album by Mereba
- Released: February 14, 2025
- Genre: Soul; folk-pop
- Length: 37:29
- Label: Secretly Canadian
- Producer: Mereba; Sam Hoffman

Mereba chronology
Azeb (2021)	The Breeze Grew a Fire (2025)

Singles from The Breeze Grew a Fire
- 1. "Counterfeit" Released: October 22, 2024; 2. "Phone Me" Released: January 23, 2025

The Breeze Grew a Fire is the second solo studio album by American singer-songwriter and rapper Mereba. It was released by Secretly Canadian on February 14, 2025. Production on the album was handled by Mereba and Sam Hoffman, a frequent collaborator. Sonically, it is primarily a soul and folk-pop record, and has lyrics containing references to Mereba's Ethiopian heritage and experience as a mother. The Breeze Grew a Fire received positive reviews from critics.

== Background and release ==
In 2019, Mereba released her debut studio album The Jungle is the Only Way Out. She then released the EP Azeb in 2021, which received a positive review from Tarisai Ngangura of Pitchfork, who highlighted its lyrical content. The lead single for The Breeze Grew a Fire, "Counterfeit", was released on October 22, 2024, alongside an announcement for the album. It was followed by the album's second single, "Phone Me", on January 23, 2025. The Breeze Grew a Fire was released on February 14, 2025, via the independent record label Secretly Canadian. Mereba worked with Sam Hoffman, a longtime collaborator, to produce the record. Mereba has said that she does not know what the album's name means, stating in an interview with Uproxx: "When I tell you, when that title came to me, I really was like, 'Okay, I don’t really get it, but I’m going to find the meaning of it.'" The Breeze Grew a Fire will be supported by a tour in the United States and Canada; it will take place throughout April to May 2025.

== Composition ==
The Breeze Grew a Fire is primarily a soul and folk-pop album. Andy Kellman of AllMusic stated that the record was reminiscent of dancehall, Afrobeats, psychedelic pop, ambient techno, and new jack swing music. Much of the album's lyrical content revolves around her Ethiopian heritage and experience as a mother, as well as the subjects of resilience, nostalgia, and romantic and familial relationships. The opening track, "Counterfeit", contains a melody described by Melvin Boateng of Clash as reminiscent of "a soda shop jukebox"; on it, Mereba softly sings the lyric, "You're the original / Don't let them counterfeit you", referencing her previous experiences with record labels. The instrumental for the second track, "Ever Needed", contains strings from the Ethiopian instrument krar, an acknowledgement of her heritage. On "Ever Needed" and "Phone Me", Mereba expresses her gratitude towards those who had helped her overcome highs and lows in her life. She has described "Phone Me" as "a sisterhood/friendship anthem dedicated to those classic bestie friendships that may have changed over the years, but are still cherished deeply."

"Breeze Grew Fire" is a spoken word piece incorporating flutes and acoustic guitars; one verse shows Mereba muttering the lyric, "Soft breeze brought my burning thing back to life", referring to the sight of a bird, the solace in overcoming grief, and the sensation of creativity. "Out of the Blue" repeats the phrase "Then, then came you", referencing her son. The following track, "Starlight (My Baby)", is a love song dedicated to her son, containing messages of self-love. "Meteorite" and "Hawk" are melodic hip-hop songs; the latter combines natural and religious imagery to compare the thoughts of loved ones to sunrises, fog at night, and hawks. The penultimate track, "Heart of a Child", details Mereba reflecting on her thoughts while running to a rooftop with her friend and contemplating coming of age. The Breeze Grew a Fire's closing track is "Sanctuary", a contemporary folk song showing Mereba in a pensive state of solitude.

== Reception ==
Professional ratings
Review scores
Source	Rating
AllMusic	4/5 stars
Clash	9/10
Pitchfork	7.8/10

The Breeze Grew a Fire received positive reviews from critics. Boateng, in a review for Clash, called the project "mellow and minimalist" and that it "delivers an air of maturity and self-actualisation". He further added that "Sanctuary" was one of the best tracks by Mereba. Kellman of AllMusic wrote that The Breeze Grew a Fire is "consummately tenderhearted" and that the production is "as comforting as a heated blanket and wholly compatible with Mereba's words and caressing voice." He also felt that the album's sixth track, "Breeze Grew Fire", contains "insight and phrasing ... worthy of any praised poet or MC." Stephen Kearse of Pitchfork highlighted "Starlight (My Baby)" as one of Mereba's best songs.

== Track listing ==
The Breeze Grew a Fire track listing
No.	Title	Writer(s)	Length
1.	"Counterfeit"	Marian Mereba; Sam Hoffman	3:12
2.	"Ever Needed"	Mereba; Hoffman; Chris James	3:04
3.	"Phone Me"	Mereba; Hoffman	2:51
4.	"White Doves"	Mereba	2:21
5.	"Breeze Grew Fire"	Mereba	1:16
6.	"Out of the Blue"	Mereba	1:21
7.	"Starlight (My Baby)"	Mereba; Hoffman; James	3:06
8.	"Meteorite"	Mereba; Hoffman	2:49
9.	"Hawk"	Mereba; Hoffman; Kibrom Birhane	3:31
10.	"Wild Sky"	Mereba; Hoffman	1:58
11.	"Spirit Guild"	Mereba; Hoffman	3:17
12.	"Heart of a Child"	Mereba; Hoffman	3:49
13.	"Sanctuary"	Mereba	3:57
Total length:			36:32

== Personnel ==
Credits adapted from Tidal.

- Mereba – vocals, writer, producer, engineer (1–4, 6–13), guitar (2, 4, 8–10, 12–13), bass (4, 8, 11, 13), drums (2, 4, 6, 9–13), piano (6), synthesizer (1–2, 4, 6, 8–12), organ (4)
- Sam Hoffman – vocals (4, 7, 9), writer (1–3, 7–12), producer, engineer, guitar (3, 5, 7–8, 11–12), bass (1–2, 5, 7–8, 11–12), drums (1, 3, 7, 9–11), synthesizer (1–2, 6, 8–11), piano (2, 13), strings (1), percussion (2), flute (5)
- LTM – vocals (7)
- Tamrat Mereba – vocals (10)
- Arima Ederra – vocals (11)
- Sheven Morris – vocals (11), drums (2, 7), percussion (2)
- Chris James – writer (2, 7), producer (7, 11), engineer (7), bass (8), strings (7, 11)
- Kibrom Birhane – writer (9), producer (9, 13), lute (2, 4, 9, 12), strings (11–13), synthesizer (9)
- Rumeal Eggleston – producer (3), bass (3)
- Michael Harris – engineer (1, 4, 8, 10–13)
- Paul Horabin – engineer (2, 7, 9, 11–13)
