= New Beginnings (Reason album) =

Studio album by Reason
- Released: October 9, 2020
- Recorded: 2019–2020
- Genre: Hip-hop
- Length: 47:39
- Labels: TDE; Caroline
- Producers: AC The Producer; Arte Mitchell; Bizness Boi; Devin Williams; Fortune; Illmind; James Delgado; Kal Banx; Mario Luciano; Mike & Keys; My Guy Mars; Nabeyin; Newz; Nils; Nostxlgic; SmokeyGotBeatz; S1; Tae Beast; Tariq Beats; The 90's; WU10

Reason chronology
| There You Have It (2018) | New Beginnings (2020) | Porches (2023) |

Singles from New Beginnings
- 1. "Flick It Up" Released: November 13, 2019; 2. "Show Stop" Released: January 24, 2020; 3. "Pop Shit" Released: March 15, 2020; 4. "Sauce" Released: September 25, 2020

New Beginnings is the debut studio album by American rapper Reason. It was released on October 9, 2020, by Top Dawg Entertainment (TDE) and Caroline Records. The album includes guest features from Schoolboy Q, Ab-Soul, Isaiah Rashad, JID, Vince Staples, Rapsody, Mereba, and Alemeda. Production was primarily handled by in-house TDE producer Kal Banx, among others.

== Background ==
The album was initially planned to be released in March 2020, but was delayed due to the COVID-19 pandemic. Reason explained the album's delay: "I had to get rid of every fear, anxiety, doubt, and negative mindset to make this project". In an interview with Paper, Reason spoke on the album, saying:

New Beginnings, to me, is getting rid of all those old fears, doubts, anxieties and anything that you have that's stopping you from doing something great. I compare it a lot to a long relationship or a job that you've been at for a long time. It's like a lot of those times you might feel like you want to leave every single day, but you just don't out of fears. Those fears can be of losing that comfortable place, having to do something else, or ultimately leaving and failing. That's what New Beginnings was for me — leaving my old life and stepping into this new life as Reason with TDE. It's almost like a celebration of getting over that fear and actually accomplishing that.

== Singles and promotion ==
On November 13, 2019, the first single, "Flick It Up", was released, featuring Ab-Soul. The second song "Show Stop", was released on January 24, 2020, featuring background vocals from Kendrick Lamar. On March 15, the third single was released, titled "Pop Shit", featuring Schoolboy Q. The fourth single was released on September 25, titled "Sauce", featuring Vince Staples.

== Track listing ==
New Beginnings track listing
| No. | Title | Writer(s) | Producer(s) | Length |
|---|---|---|---|---|
| 1. | "Something More" | Robert Gill, Jr. | Kal Banx; AC The Producer; WU10; Nabeyin; Newz | 3:16 |
| 2. | "Stories I Forgot" | Gill, Jr. | Kal Banx | 3:03 |
| 3. | "Pop Shit" (with Schoolboy Q) | Gill, Jr.; Quincy Hanley | Kal Banx; James Delgado | 2:43 |
| 4. | "Show Stop" | Gill, Jr. | The 90's; Illmind | 2:59 |
| 5. | "Favorite Nigga" | Gill, Jr. | Kal Banx; Mario Luciano | 2:04 |
| 6. | "I Can Make It" (featuring Rapsody) | Gill, Jr.; Marlanna Evans | S1 | 3:57 |
| 7. | "Fall" | Gill, Jr. | Nabeyin; SmokeyGotBeatz | 3:43 |
| 8. | "Slow Down" (featuring Alemeda) | Gill, Jr. | Kal Banx; Arte Mitchell | 3:49 |
| 9. | "Flick It Up" (featuring Ab-Soul) | Gill, Jr.; Herbert Stevens | Nostxlgic; Tae Beast | 2:42 |
| 10. | "Sauce" (featuring Vince Staples) | Gill, Jr.; Vincent Staples | Bizness Boi; Nils | 2:58 |
| 11. | "Extinct" (featuring Isaiah Rashad and JID) | Gill, Jr.; Isaiah McClain; Destin Route; Daniel Dumile | Devin Williams | 3:42 |
| 12. | "Westside" (featuring Mereba) | Gill, Jr.; Marian Mereba | Kal Banx; AC The Producer; Nabeyin; Fortune | 3:52 |
| 13. | "Gossip" | Gill, Jr. | Kal Banx; Tariq Beats; Mike & Keys; My Guy Mars | 4:03 |
| 14. | "Windows Cry" | Gill, Jr. | Kal Banx; WU10 | 4:48 |
| Total length: | | | | 47:39 |
