= EarthGang =

American hip-hop duo

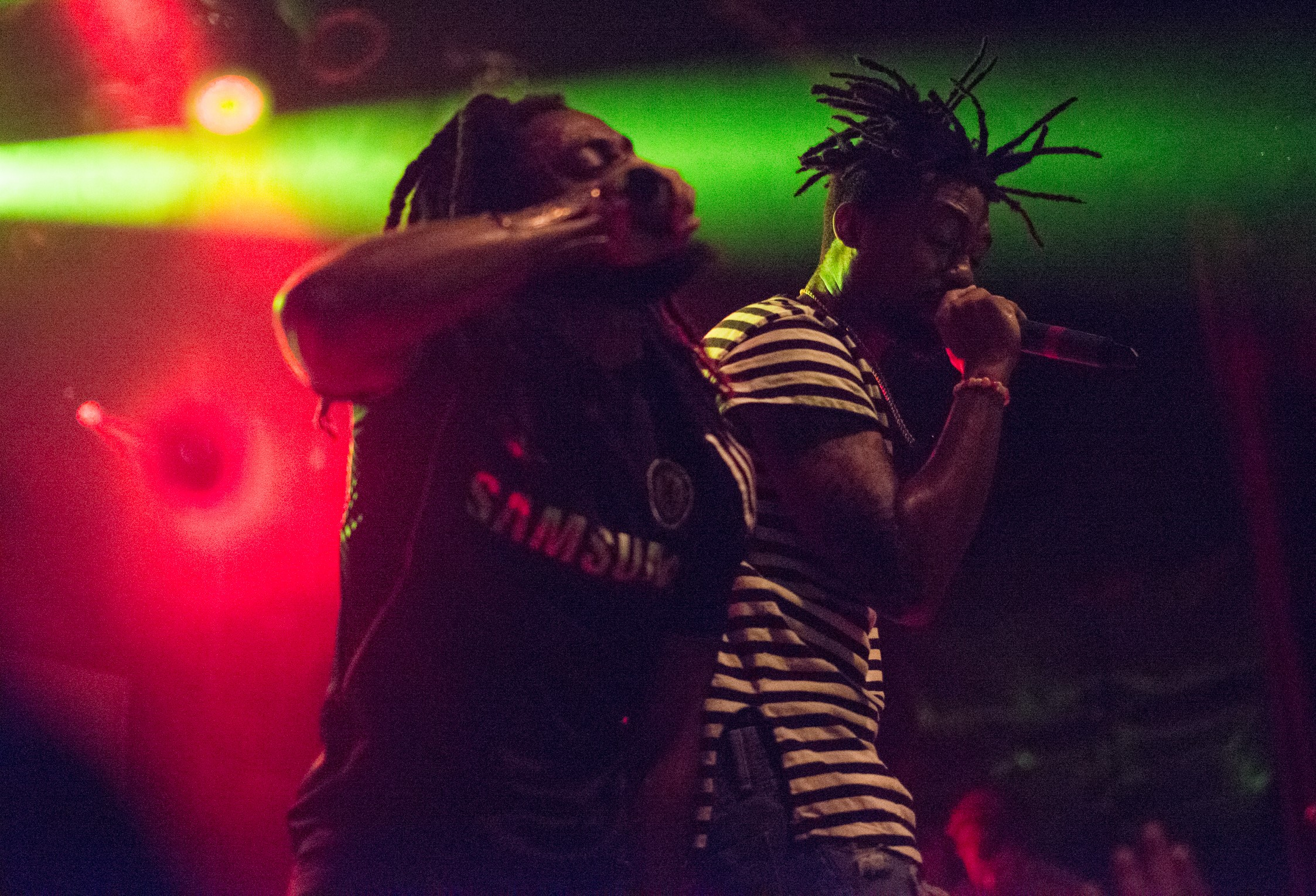
- EarthGang performs at The Mod Club in Toronto

Background information
- Origin: Atlanta, Georgia, U.S.
- Genres: Hip-hop; soul; funk
- Years active: 2008–present
- Labels: Spillage Village; Dreamville; Interscope; SinceThe80s; UnitedMasters
- Members: Olu (aka Johnny Venus); WowGr8 (aka Doctur Dot)

EarthGang (stylized EARTHGANG) is an American hip-hop duo from Atlanta, Georgia, composed of Olu (aka Johnny Venus; born Olu Onyemachi Dakarai Fann) and WowGr8 (aka Doctur Dot; born Eian Parker). They are co-founders of the musical collective Spillage Village, with JID, Hollywood JB, JordxnBryant, 6lack, Mereba, and Benji.

Formed in 2008, EarthGang released their first EP, The Better Party, in 2010. This was followed by several singles and two mixtapes, Mad Men and Good News in 2011. In 2013, the duo released their debut album, Shallow Graves For Toys, and was largely well received, with Noisey calling it "one of the most well thought-out releases of the year" and praising the album's "playful delivery and biting lyricism." Their second album, Strays with Rabies, was released to positive reviews in 2015. After signing to J. Cole's Dreamville Records, EarthGang released a trilogy of EPs: Rags, Robots (2017), and Royalty (2018), leading up to their major label debut album, Mirrorland (2019).

== History ==
=== 2008–2009: Formation ===
The rap duo EarthGang was first formed in 2008 by Johnny Venus and Doctur Dot, then both high school students in Atlanta, Georgia. According to Johnny Venus, they had first met on a field trip in 9th grade at Benjamin Elijah Mays High School, with Venus later approaching Doctur Dot to ask about forming a music group. Avid fans of rap and hip-hop, both members had grown up listening to artists as diverse as the Ohio Players, Dizzy Gillespie, Madonna, and Richard Pryor. About their name EarthGang, Venus explained in 2011 that "The name came to me abruptly one day. It represents what we're made of and why we do what we do. It's for the people by the people. Our music is influenced by the conscious and subconscious, and we create it to influence the like."

=== 2010–2013: Early releases ===
On January 26, 2010, the group released its first EP, the mixtape titled The Better Party. Their first full-length recording project, they recorded in a multitude of studio spaces, which, according to Venus, included "dorm rooms at Hampton University, closets in Atlanta, a house studio owned by 'Mr. Fish' (a fellow underground Atlanta musician), and finally in Hampton University's Music Recording Technology Jazz studio." The EP was mixed and mastered by EarthGang, with help from Jack Swain. Also in 2010, they began touring in the United States, performing at festivals such as the A3C Festival in Atlanta. They released periodic singles as well, and in November 2010 they debuted the song "Miss the Show." In early 2011 they taped and released a music video for "Kick'n It", a track first included on The Better Party. Soon afterwards they released the single "Opium", which they would later film a music video for. The group self-released two albums in 2011: Mad Men in April, and Good News in December.

They released their track "The F Bomb" on June 4, 2012. The song would later be included on a 2014 album and was made into a music video. "Machete", a single produced by 808 Mafia, was self-released by EarthGang on February 10, 2013, shortly before the release of their music video for their 2012 single "Fire Kicking Tree Limbs". In March 2013 the group released "UFOs", a slow single over nine minutes long. According to a review in Pigeons and Planes, "Sexual, contemplative, sprawling, and slow, EarthGang's 'UFOs' veers far left from the duo's last music expedition 'Machete' and hews a bit closer to the earthy soul that typified so much mid-'90s Dungeon Family output." They again performed at the A3C Festival in early 2013, also opening for Black Fest at Stanford University.

=== 2013–2016: Shallow Graves for Toys and Strays With Rabies ===
On July 8, 2013, EarthGang released their album Shallow Graves for Toys on the imprint Spillage Village. The album includes several singles released earlier, such as "The F Bomb", "UFOs", and "Machete". "The F Bomb" was produced by Hollywood JB of Spillage Village. The album was re-released on iTunes in the summer of 2014. In response to Shallow Graves For Toys, in 2014, Noisey called EarthGang "an engaging, clever rap duo", praising the album's "playful delivery and biting lyricism" and calling it "one of the most well thought-out releases of the year." Since the album, EarthGang has released several official music videos from the album. In the summer of 2014, the video for "The F Bomb" was released. On September 20, 2014, EarthGang began supporting a 40 date tour with their collaborator Ab-Soul, a member of Top Dawg Entertainment.

On February 26, 2015, EarthGang released a 7 track EP called Torba with track titles for each day of the week. The EP included features from Mac Miller, OG Maco, and JordxnBryant, with production from Childish Major, Shine, Zeroh, Hollywood JB, and more. On July 6, Spillage Village released their second mixtape Bears Like This Too. On November 6, 2015, EarthGang released their second album, entitled Strays with Rabies. The album includes features and cuts from JID, DJ Khalil, DrewsThatDuDe, Ducko McFli, J.U.S.T.I.C.E. League, Richie Quake, SykSense. They were also one of the featuring artists on Mac Miller's GO:OD AM tour. EarthGang has stated they as well contributed to the production of the album. On June 3, 2016, the duo would join Dreamville Records' Bas on his nationwide Too High to Riot Tour. The tour would later be reprised in Europe on November 13. On December 2, 2016, Spillage Village released Bears Like This Too Much with features from J. Cole and Bas, and production from Mac Miller, Ducko Mcfli, Childish Major and J. Cole among others.

=== 2017–2019: Rags, Robots, Royalty, and Mirrorland ===
On August 31, 2017, rapper J. Cole's imprint Dreamville Records announced the signing of the duo and they released their Dreamville debut project the following day, the first extended play from their trilogy titled Rags. The project features guest appearances from D.C. Young Fly, Childish Major, Mick Jenkins, and fellow Spilage Village member and Dreamville artist JID. Their second EP in the trilogy Robots was released on October 20, with SiR as a guest feature. The third was released on February 23, 2018, named Royalty, with features coming from Ari Lennox and Mereba. In 2017 and 2018, EarthGang co-headlined in the North American and European Never Had Shit Tour with JID, and guests Lute, Chaz French, and Mereba. A year after serving as the opening act on the European leg of J. Cole's 4 Your Eyez Only World Tour, EarthGang were also the supporting act on 36 shows of the North American KOD Tour in 2018.

On September 4, 2018, EarthGang premiered the song "Up" on the Berlin platform Colors Studio. On September 21, they released a single titled "Stuck" featuring Arin Ray. In January 2019, the duo announced that they will be a supporting act for Smino on the Hoopti Tour. On February 5, 2019, they released the second single "Proud of U" featuring Young Thug. On July 5, 2019, Dreamville Records released their 3rd collaborative album, Revenge of the Dreamers III. Earthgang contributed to five songs including "Down Bad", "Swivel", and "Sacrifices" on the album. On August 30, they officially released the single "Up", and "Ready to Die" on September 2. Mirrorland was released on September 6, 2019, and includes features from Young Thug, T-Pain, Kehlani, and Arin Ray. The production of the album was handled by a variety of producers including Olu, J. Cole, Elite, Ron Gilmore, Christo, Bink, DJ Dahi, Childish Major and Groove, among others.

=== 2020–present: Spilligion and Ghetto Gods ===
On September 25, 2020, Spillage Village released their fourth collective album Spilligion, with EarthGang part of the singles "End of Daze", "Baptize", and "Hapi". The duo also released the single "Powered Up" and appeared on songs with TOKiMONSTA, Louis The Child, Sinéad Harnett, and Gorillaz in 2020. On December 18, EarthGang released the first single from their next album, Options, featuring Wale. On February 16, 2021, EarthGang revealed the album title, Ghetto Gods.

On December 8, 2021, EarthGang released the first official single for the album titled "American Horror Story". On January 14, 2022, the second single titled "All Eyes On Me" was released, accompanied by a music video. The third single, "Amen" featuring Musiq Soulchild was released on February 22, and was premiered on the Apple Music 1 radio show. On the same day, they also announced the Biodeghettable Tour, with Mike Dimes and Pigeons & Planes supporting. On February 25, 2022, Ghetto Gods was released, including guest appearances from Future, JID, J. Cole, Musiq Soulchild, Baby Tate, Lynae Vanee, CeeLo Green, Nick Cannon, and Ari Lennox. On March 31, they appeared on the Dreamville compilation D-Day: A Gangsta Grillz Mixtape, on the songs "Ghetto Gods Freestyle", "Jozi Flows" and "Everybody Ain't Shit".

EarthGang performed at the 22nd Coachella Valley Music and Arts Festival in April 2023.

== Musical style ==
Incorporating Southern hip-hop and genres such as funk and soul music, EarthGang has drawn comparisons to groups such as Outkast, Dungeon Family and The Pharcyde, among other artists. Stated the duo in early 2011, "When we create, our goal is to set the listener in a mood for each track... the style is all a part of the execution. You'll hear who we are, where we're from, and what sounds we like through our music. We pay attention to details."

== Members ==
- Olu (aka Johnny Venus) – born Olu Onyemachi Dakarai Fann on October 9, 1989
- WowGr8 (aka Doctur Dot) – born Eian Undrai Parker on October 25, 1990

== Discography ==
=== Albums ===
Title	Details	Peak chart positions			
Title	Details	US	US R&B/HH	US Rap	CAN
Shallow Graves for Toys	Released: July 8, 2013; Re-released: June 24, 2014; Label: Spillage Village; Format: Digital download	—	—	—	—
Strays with Rabies	Released: November 6, 2015; Label: Spillage Village; Format: Digital Download, vinyl	—	—	—	—
Mirrorland	Released: September 6, 2019; Label: Dreamville, Interscope, Spillage Village; Format: CD, digital download, vinyl	40	22	20	81
Ghetto Gods	Released: February 25, 2022; Label: Dreamville, Interscope, Spillage Village; Format: CD, digital download, vinyl	114	—	—	—
Perfect Fantasy	Released: October 29, 2024; Label: SinceThe80s, Dreamville; Format: CD, digital download, vinyl	—	—	—	—
"—" denotes a recording that did not chart or was not released in that territory.

=== Extended plays ===
Title	Details
Torba	Released: February 26, 2015; Label: Spillage Village; Format: Digital
Rags	Released: August 31, 2017; Label: Spillage Village; Format: Digital download
Robots	Released: October 20, 2017; Label: Spillage Village; Format: Digital download
Royalty	Released: February 23, 2018; Label: Spillage Village; Format: Digital download
EarthGang vs. The Algorithm: RIP Human Art	Released: September 22, 2023; Label: Dreamville, Spillage Village, SinceThe80s, UnitedMasters; Format: Digital download
Robophobia	Released: February 23, 2024; Label: Dreamville, Spillage Village, SinceThe80s, UnitedMasters; Format: Digital download
Snakegang (with Snakehips)	Released: July 19, 2024; Label: Never Worry; Format: Digital download

=== Mixtapes ===
Title	Details
The Better Party	Released: January 26, 2010; Label: Self-released; Format: Digital download
Mad Men	Released: April 30, 2011; Label: Self-released; Format: Digital download
Hidden By The City (with JID)	Released: September 28, 2011; Label: Self-released; Format: digital download
Good News	Released: December 26, 2011; Label: Self-released; Format: CD, digital download

=== Compilation albums ===
List of albums, with selected chart positions
Title	Details	Peak chart positions			Certifications
Title	Details	US	US R&B/HH	US Rap	Certifications
Revenge of the Dreamers III (with Dreamville)	Released: July 5, 2019; Label: Dreamville, Interscope; Format: CD, LP, digital download	1	1	1	RIAA: Platinum
D-Day: A Gangsta Grillz Mixtape (with Dreamville)	Released: March 31, 2022; Label: Dreamville, Interscope; Format: Digital download	11	6	4	

=== Collaborative albums ===
List of albums, with selected chart positions
Title	Details	Peak chart positions
Title	Details	US
Spilligion (with Spillage Village and JID)	Released: September 25, 2020; Label: Dreamville, Interscope, SinceThe80s; Format: Digital download	141
"—" denotes a recording that did not chart or was not released in that territory.

=== Singles ===
==== As lead artist ====
Title	Year	Peak chart positions						Certifications	Album
Title	Year	US	US R&B/HH	US Rap	US Adult R&B	CAN	NZ Hot	Certifications	Album
"The F Bomb"	2014	—	—	—	—	—	—		Shallow Graves For Toys
"Liquor Sto'" (featuring Marian Mereba)	2015	—	—	—	—	—	—		Strays With Rabbies
"Momma Told Me" (featuring JID)	2015	—	—	—	—	—	—		Strays With Rabbies
"Meditate" (featuring JID)	2017	—	—	—	—	—	—		Rags
"Robots"	2017	—	—	—	—	—	—		Robots
"Nothing but the Best" (featuring Ari Lennox)	2018	—	—	—	—	—	—		Royalty
"Stuck" (featuring Arin Ray)	2018	—	—	—	—	—	—		Mirrorland
"Proud of U" (featuring Young Thug)	2019	—	—	—	—	—	—		Mirrorland
"Down Bad" (with JID, Bas and J. Cole featuring Young Nudy)	2019	64	30	24	—	93	10	RIAA: Platinum; RMNZ: Gold	Revenge of the Dreamers III
"UP"	2019	—	—	—	—	—	—		Mirrorland
"Collide" (with Tiana Major9)	2019	—	—	—	9	—	—		Queen & Slim: The Soundtrack and At Sixes And Sevens
"Still Up" (featuring Reason)	2020	—	—	—	—	—	—		Revenge of the Dreamers III: Director's Cut
"End of Daze" (with Spillage Village & JID featuring Jurdan Bryant, Mereba & Hollywood JB)	2020	—	—	—	—	—	—		Spilligion
"Powered Up"	2020	—	—	—	—	—	—		Madden NFL 21
"Baptize" (with Spillage Village & JID)	2020	—	—	—	—	—	—		Spilligion
"Hapi" (with Spillage Village & Benji. featuring Mereba & Big Rube)	2020	—	—	—	—	—	—		Spilligion
"Options" (featuring Wale)	2020	—	—	—	—	—	—		Non-album single
"Run It Up" (with Snakehips)	2021	—	—	—	—	—	—		Non-album single
"American Horror Story"	2021	—	—	—	—	—	—		Ghetto Gods
"All Eyes On Me"	2022	—	—	—	—	—	—		Ghetto Gods
"Amen"	2022	—	—	—	—	—	—		Ghetto Gods
"Been a Minute" (with Snakehips)	2024	—	—	—	—	—	—		SnakeGang
"—" denotes a recording that did not chart or was not released in that territory.

==== As featured artist ====
List of singles as a featured artist, showing year released and album name
Title	Year	Album
"Anarchy" (Jarren Benton featuring EarthGang)	2016	Slow Motion Vol. 2
"Can't Call It" (Spillage Village featuring EarthGang, JID, J. Cole and Bas)	2016	Bears Like This Too Much
"D/Vision" (JID featuring EarthGang)	2017	The Never Story
"Voodoo" (Spillage Village featuring EarthGang)	2017	Bears Like This Too Much
"Church" (Samm Henshaw featuring EarthGang)	2019	—N/a
"Hope You're Happy" (Emeryld featuring EarthGang)	2019	Young
"Fried For The Night" (TOKiMONSTA featuring EarthGang)	2020	Oasis Nocturno
"Big Love" (Louis The Child featuring EarthGang)	2020	Here for Now
"Take Me Away" (Sinéad Harnett featuring EarthGang)	2020	Ready Is Always Too Late
"Stargazer" (Tommy Newport featuring EarthGang)	2021	—N/a
"Run It Up" (Snakehips featuring EarthGang)	2021	—N/a
"You Comfort Me" (James Vickery featuring EarthGang)	2021	—N/a
"Better Days" (Dermot Kennedy featuring EarthGang)	2022	TBA
"Mess Around" (Forest Claudette featuring EarthGang)	2023	Everything Was Green
"Look Into My Eyes" (Of The Trees featuring EarthGang)	2026	Moonglade Park
"Nirvana" (Pnau featuring EarthGang)	2026	Ahhcade

==== Other charted and certified songs ====
List of songs, with selected chart positions and certifications, showing year released and album name
Title	Year	Peak chart positions		Certifications	Album
Title	Year	US Bub.	NZ Hot	Certifications	Album
"Wells Fargo (Interlude)" (with Dreamville and JID featuring Buddy, and Guapdad 4000)	2019	22	—		Revenge of the Dreamers III
"Sacrifices" (with Dreamville and J. Cole featuring Smino and Saba)	2019	—	—	RIAA: Platinum; RMNZ: Gold	Revenge of the Dreamers III
"Waterboyz" (with JID and J. Cole)	2022	—	29		Ghetto Gods
"—" denotes a recording that did not chart or was not released in that territory.

=== Guest appearances ===
List of non-single guest appearances, with other performing artists, showing year released and album name
Title	Year	Other artist(s)	Album
"Throwed"	2010	JID	Cakewalk
"Purple Paradise"	2012	JID, Stillz	Route of Evil
"Rolling Stoner"	2013	Mereba, JID	Room For Living Remixes
"October / 3 Storms"	2013	JID	Para Tu
"Green Onions"	2014	JID, Money Makin' Nique	Lucky Buddha
"LeHooligangs"	2015	JID, OG Maco	DiCaprio
"Premonition"	2017	Lute, Cam O'bi	West1996 pt. 2
"New Malcolm X"	2018	Sy Ari Da Kid, JID	Better Safe Than Sy Ari
"Big Titties"	2019	Rico Nasty, Kenny Beats, Baauer	Anger Management
"Wells Fargo (Interlude)"	2019	JID, Buddy, Guapdad 4000	Revenge of the Dreamers III
"1993"	2019	Buddy, Smino, Cozz, JID, J. Cole	Revenge of the Dreamers III
"Sacrifices"	2019	J. Cole, Smino & Saba	Revenge of the Dreamers III
"Jollof Rice"	2019	Bas	Spilled Milk 1
"Not Numb"	2019	Childish Major, Buddy	Dirt Road Diamond
"The Light"	2020	Mick Jenkins	The Circus
"Up Up Away"	2020	JID, Vince Staples	Revenge of the Dreamers III: Director's Cut
"Revenge"	2020	Lute, Omen, Ari Lennox, Childish Major, Reason	Revenge of the Dreamers III: Director's Cut
"No Fear No More (Remix)"	2020	Madeon	Non-album single
"Super Bounce"	2020	Duckwrth	SuperGood
"Opium"	2020	Gorillaz	Song Machine, Season One: Strange Timez
"Goat Head (Remix)"	2020	Brittany Howard	Jaime (Reimagined)
"Wildlings"	2020	Tobe Nwigwe, Duckwrth	Non-album single
"Problems"	2020	Domani	Non-album single
"Choose"	2021	Neelam	Non-album single
"Out of the Blue (Remix)"	2021	RINI	Non-album single
"Take It or Leave It"	2021	Angélique Kidjo	Mother Nature
"Act Up"	2021	Rich Brian	Shang-Chi and the Legend of the Ten Rings: The Album
"Honey"	2021	Jordan Hawkins	Heart Won't Stop
"Never Be The Same"	2021	Friends Only, Kabaka Pyramid, Buddy, MediSun, Hector Roots Lewis	—N/a
"L.O.V.E."	2022	Yung Bae, Jon Batiste, Sherwyn	Groove Continental: Side A
"Ghetto Gods Freestyle"	2022	2 Chainz	D-Day: A Gangsta Grillz Mixtape
"Jozi Flows"	2022	Bas	D-Day: A Gangsta Grillz Mixtape
"Everybody Ain't Shit"	2022	—N/a	D-Day: A Gangsta Grillz Mixtape
"Sk8"	2025	JID, Ciara	God Does Like Ugly

== Tours ==
=== Headlining ===
- Never Had Shit Tour (with JID) (2017–18)
- What On Earth Tour (2019)
- Welcome to Mirrorland (2019–20)
- Biodeghettable (2022)

=== Supporting ===
- These Days Tour (Ab-Soul) (2014)
- GO:OD AM Tour (Mac Miller) (2015)
- Too High To Riot Tour (Bas) (2016)
- 4 Your Eyez Only Tour (J. Cole) (2017)
- KOD Tour (J. Cole) (2018)
- 1 by 1 Tour (Billie Eilish) (2018–19)
- Hoopti Tour (Smino) (2019)
- North America Tour Fall 2022 (Gorillaz) (2022)
- Forever and a Day Tour 2023 (JID) (2023)
- Insano World Tour (Kid Cudi) (2024)
- Let God Sort Em Out Tour (Clipse) (2025)

== Awards and nominations ==
Award	Year	Category	Work	Result	Ref.
ARIA Music Awards	2023	Best Soul/R&B Release	Forest Claudette (featuring EarthGang) – "Mess Around"	Won	
BET Hip Hop Awards	2020	Best Duo/Group	Themselves	Nominated	
Black Reel Awards	2020	Outstanding Original Song	"Collide" (with Tiana Major9)	Won	
Grammy Award	2020	Best Rap Performance	"Down Bad" (with J. Cole, JID, Bas and Young Nudy)	Nominated	
Grammy Award	2021	Best R&B Song	"Collide" (with Tiana Major9)	Nominated	
