= Rags (EP) =

EP by EarthGang
- Released: August 31, 2017
- Recorded: 2015–2017
- Genre: Conscious hip-hop; southern hip-hop; neo-soul
- Length: 24:01
- Label: Spillage Village; Empire
- Producer: J. Cole (exec.); Ibrahim Hamad (exec.); Anonxmous; Childish Major; Elite; Hollywood JB; Ron Gilmore

EarthGang chronology
Strays with Rabies (2015)	Rags (2017)	Robots (2017)

Singles from Rags
- 1. "Meditate" Released: September 1, 2017

Rags is the third EP by American hip-hop duo EarthGang, released August 31, 2017 by Spillage Village and distributed by Empire Distribution. Released after the announcement of their signing to Dreamville, it is the first installment in a trilogy of EPs, leading up to their debut album, Mirrorland.

== Background ==
EarthGang initially met J. Cole in 2014 while touring with Ab-Soul and was told by their manager that "Cole was feelin' them". Shortly after the release of their 2015 album Strays with Rabies and while touring with Bas in 2016, Dot and Venus began recording a "deconstructed album" which would form the three EPs, leading up to their major-label debut album, Mirrorland. It features production from Hollywood JB, Childish Major, Anonxmous, and Ron Gilmore. The EP features guests appearance from JID, Childish Major, and Mick Jenkins.

== Singles and promotion ==
Upon announcing that the duo was signed to Dreamville, music video for "Meditate" featuring JID was released the same day as the EP release.

== Critical reception ==
Rags has received positive reviews since its release. In a positive review from Creative Loafing, Montana Samuels wrote: "Rather than providing an outwardly raised fist to the system of politics and oppression that are all too familiar to black men growing up in the city, EarthGang’s Johnny “Olu O. Fann” Venus and Doctur “Eian Undrai Parker” Dot alternatively pen an even-keeled reflection of black life in America".

== Track listing ==
No.	Title	Writer(s)	Producer(s)	Length
1.	"Meditate" (featuring JID)	Olu. O Fann; Anthony Parrino; Eian Undrai Parker; Destin Route	Elite	4:38
2.	"Nowhere Fast" (featuring Childish Major)	Fann; Parker; Marcus Randle	Childish Major	3:57
3.	"Red Light"	Fann; Parker	Anonxmous	3:13
4.	"Legendari"	Fann; Parker; Randle	Childish Major	5:22
5.	"House" (featuring Mick Jenkins)	Fann; Parker; Justin Bryant; Ronald Gilmore; Jayson Jenkins	Hollywood JB; Ron Gilmore	6:15
Total length:				24:01

== Charts ==
Chart (2017)	Peak position
US Independent Albums (Billboard)	48
US Heatseekers Albums (Billboard)	16
