= Mereba =

Ethiopian-American singer and rapper

- Born: Marian Azeb Mereba; Montgomery, Alabama, U.S.
- Genres: R&B; soul; hip-hop
- Occupations: Singer; rapper; songwriter; record producer
- Instrument: Vocals
- Years active: 2013–present
- Labels: Red Kotton; Jam Solutions; Remote Control Music; Interscope; Secretly Canadian
- Member of: Spillage Village
- Website: merebamusic.com

Marian Azeb Mereba, known mononymously as Mereba, is an American singer, rapper, songwriter, and record producer.

== Early life and education ==
Mereba was born in Montgomery, Alabama, and raised in Pennsylvania. Her father is from Ethiopia. Her mother is African American and was born and raised in Milwaukee, Wisconsin. Her family moved frequently because of her parents' jobs as university professors.

Mereba first developed an interest in music at age four. She began writing songs in elementary school and learned to play the piano and guitar. She went to high school in Greensboro, North Carolina.

Mereba attended Carnegie Mellon University before transferring to Spelman College. She graduated from Spelman in 2011 with an English degree and a music minor.

== Career ==
=== 2013–2017: Room For Living, Radio Flyer, and Spillage Village ===
After several years performing in the indie music scene in Atlanta, Mereba self-released her debut project Room For Living EP, under her full name, on February 14, 2013.

=== 2018–2019, 2021: The Jungle is the Only Way Out & "Glock Peaceful" ===
In 2018, Mereba signed to Interscope Records, releasing the singles "Black Truck" and "Planet U", which went on to appear on her debut album, The Jungle Is The Only Way Out, released February 27, 2019. The album, often acronymed as TJITOWO, was written and produced by Mereba with co-production by Samuel Hoffman, excluding the 9th Wonder-produced track, "Black Truck".

On December 13, 2021, Mereba released "Glock Peaceful", which envisions a country free of gun violence and police brutality. The song was featured on season 5 of the show Insecure produced by Issa Rae on HBO Max.

=== 2024-present: The Breeze Grew a Fire ===
In October 2024, it was announced Mereba signed a deal with Secretly Canadian, releasing the single "Counterfeit", which served as the lead single to her second album The Breeze Grew a Fire, which was released on February 14, 2025.

== Influences ==
Mereba has cited Stevie Wonder as a mentor and musical influence. In 2017, she performed alongside Wonder in Malibu.

== Discography ==
=== Studio albums ===
List of studio albums, with selected details
Title	Album details
The Jungle is the Only Way Out	Released: February 27, 2019; Label: Interscope; Format: CD, LP, digital download, streaming
Spilligion (as part of Spillage Village)	Released: September 25, 2020; Label: Dreamville, Interscope, Sincethe80's; Format: CD, LP, Digital download, streaming
The Breeze Grew a Fire	Released: February 14, 2025; Label: Secretly Canadian; Format: LP, digital download, streaming

=== Extended plays ===
List of extended plays, with selected details
Title	Mixtape details
Room For Living	Released: February 14, 2013; Label: Self-released; Format: Digital download, streaming
Radio Flyer	Unreleased; originally slated for July 2014; Label: Red Kotton; Format: Digital download, streaming
Kotton House, Vol. 1	Released: February 10, 2017; Label: Jam Solutions, Remote Control Music; Format: Digital download, streaming
Azeb	Released: May 26, 2021; Label: Interscope; Format: Digital download, streaming

=== Singles ===
List of singles, with showing year released and album name
Title	Year	Album(s)
"September"	2014	Non-album singles
"Radio Flyer"	2014	Non-album singles
"Bet"	2016	Non-album singles
"Black Truck"	2018	Non-album singles
"Planet U"	2018	Non-album singles
"Late Bloomer"	2018	Non-album singles
"Sandstorm"	2019	Non-album singles

=== Guest appearances ===
Title	Year	Other performer(s)	Album
"UFOs"	2013	EarthGang	Shallow Graves For Toys
"Ultra Rare"	2013	EarthGang	Shallow Graves For Toys
"Grand Theft Auto"	2013	JID	Para Tu
"Church"	2014	Miloh Smith	Pulp Fiction
"Good Night"	2014	Cyhi the Prynce	Black Hystori Project
"Lucky Buddha"	2014	JID, Money Makin' Nique	Lucky Buddha
"Calypso"	2014	Khary	Swim Team
"Fryin'"	2015	Spillage Village	Bears Like This Too
"Love Child"	2015	Spillage Village	Bears Like This Too
"Liquor Sto'"	2015	EarthGang	Strays With Rabies
"Lady Nectarine"	2015	EarthGang	Strays With Rabies
"Letters"	2015	JID	Non-album single
"Off The Lot"	2018	EarthGang	Royalty
"PTSD"	2019	Dreamville	Revenge of the Dreamers III
"Myrlie"	2019	Rapsody	Eve
"Yo Love"	2019	Vince Staples, 6lack	Queen & Slim: The Soundtrack
"Self"	2020	Brandon Banks	Static
"Same Boat"	2020	Kojey Radical	Non-album single
"Like I Feel"	2020	Xavier Omar	If You Feel
"Westside"	2020	Reason	New Beginnings
"End of Daze"	2020	Spillage Village	Spilligion
"Hapi"	2020	Spillage Village	Spilligion
"Pslamsing"	2020	Spillage Village	Spilligion
"Golden Pt. 2"	2020	Berhana	Non-album single
"Where I'm From"	2022	Ravyn Lenae	Hypnos
"Pele"	2022	Luedji Luna	Bom Mesmo É Estar Debaixo D'Água Deluxe
"Oh God"	2024	Arima Ederra	Non-album single
"Of Blue"	2025	JID	God Does Like Ugly
