= Reason (American rapper) =

American rapper

- Born: Robert Lee Gill Jr. September 21, 1990 (age 36); Carson, California, U.S.
- Genre: Hip-hop
- Occupations: Rapper; songwriter
- Instrument: Vocals
- Years active: 2015–present
- Labels: Top Dawg; Caroline; Do More; 195 Oak

Robert Lee Gill Jr., better known by his stage name Reason, is an American rapper and songwriter. He was formerly signed to hip-hop record label Top Dawg Entertainment, where he started to gain recognition. His TDE debut, There You Have It, was released on September 28, 2018, a re-release of an album from 2017. His major label debut album New Beginnings was released on October 9, 2020.

== Career ==
Reason released his first mixtape, In The Meantime, on January 1, 2015. On January 16, 2016, he released his next mixtape titled The Free Album, while releasing a compilation mixtape called The Proof on his SoundCloud later in 2016. On February 9, 2018, he was featured on the Top Dawg Entertainment produced film soundtrack for the Marvel Studios superhero film Black Panther (2018), titled Black Panther: The Album, on the song "Seasons".

On August 8, it was announced that he was signed to TDE. That same day, he released a single titled "The Soul", with a music video released the next week. On August 29, he released the second single titled "Better Dayz", a song that had already made an appearance on his first mixtape. On September 11, he released the third single titled "Summer Up", also accompanied by a music video. He was also featured on Los Angeles rapper JAG's album with Cozz on "Black Boy Rise". He is also scheduled to go on tour with Jay Rock on the "Big Redemption Tour". Reason released his mixtape, There You Have It, on September 28, 2018. The album was originally released on May 19, 2017, but upon signing with TDE, the label decided to re-release the album.

On January 6, 2019, it was announced that Reason was invited to the Dreamville recording sessions for the compilation album Revenge of the Dreamers III. He later announced that he will be joining the first leg of JID's "Catch Me If You Can Tour".

On February 14, 2020, Reason announced the title of his album New Beginnings. On April 24, as part of Top Dawg Entertainment's Fan Appreciation Week, Reason released the song "Might Not Make It". On October 9, 2020, Reason released the album New Beginnings. He explained the album's delay: "I had to get rid of every fear, anxiety, doubt, and negative mindset to make this project".

== Artistry ==
=== Influences ===
In an interview, Reason named Lil Wayne, J. Cole, Eminem, Fabolous, and Lupe Fiasco as his inspirations and favorite hip-hop artists.

== Discography ==
=== Studio albums ===
List of albums, with album details
Title	Album details
New Beginnings	Released: October 9, 2020; Label: Top Dawg, Caroline; Format: CD, digital download, streaming
Porches	Released: August 11, 2023; Label: Top Dawg, Caroline; Format: Digital download, streaming
I Love You Again	Released: February 28, 2025; Label: Do More Records, 195 Oak; Format: Digital download, streaming

=== Mixtapes ===
Title	Album details
In the Meantime	Released: January 1, 2015; Label: Self-released; Format: Digital download
The Free Album	Released: January 16, 2016; Label: Self-released; Format: Digital download
The Proof	Released: August 19, 2016; Label: Self-released; Format: Digital download
There You Have It	Released: May 19, 2017; Re-released: September 28, 2018; Label: Top Dawg; Format: CD, digital download

=== Singles ===
==== As lead artist ====
Title	Year	Album
"Better Dayz"	2018	There You Have It
"Summer Up"	2018	There You Have It
"Flick It Up" (featuring Ab-Soul)	2019	New Beginnings
"Show Stop"	2020	New Beginnings
"Trapped In" (featuring Boogie and Ab-Soul)	2020	Non-album single
"Pop Shit" (featuring Schoolboy Q)	2020	New Beginnings
"Sauce" (featuring Vince Staples)	2020	New Beginnings

==== As featured artist ====
List of singles as a featured artist, showing year released and album name
Title	Year	Album
"LamboTruck" (Dreamville and Cozz featuring Reason and Childish Major)	2019	Revenge of the Dreamers III
"Still Up" (Dreamville and EarthGang featuring Reason)	2020	Revenge of the Dreamers III: Director's Cut

=== Guest appearances ===
List of non-single guest appearances, with other performing artists, showing year released and album name
Title	Year	Other artist(s)	Album
"Seasons"	2018	Mozzy, Sjava	Black Panther: The Album
"Black Boy Rise"	2018	JAG, Cozz	2700
"Revenge"	2020	Lute, Omen, Ari Lennox, EarthGang, Childish Major	Revenge of the Dreamers III: Director's Cut
"Weighing Me Down"	2020	Deante' Hitchcock	Better

== Tours ==
Supporting

- Big Redemption Tour (Jay Rock) (2018)
- Catch Me If You Can Tour (JID) (2019)

== Personal life ==
Reason, as Rob Gill, played college basketball at Cerritos College in 2011-2012, and later Northwestern College (Iowa) in 2013.. Gill is also the twin brother of Prentice Gill, the Assistant WR Coach for the Baltimore Ravens.
