= There You Have It (mixtape) =

Mixtape by Reason
- Released: September 28, 2018
- Recorded: 2016–17
- Genre: Hip hop
- Length: 56:48; 45:31 (re-release)
- Label: TDE
- Producer: SWI$H; Kampo; YONDO Beats; Nikko Bunkin; Tropical Gameboy; Deafh Beats; Classic Beats; Theopolis; Dmusic605; Marqell O'Connor

Reason chronology
The Free Album (2016)	There You Have It (2018)	New Beginnings (2020)

Original mixtape cover

Singles from There You Have It
- 1. "Better Dayz" Released: August 29, 2018; 2. "Summer Up" Released: September 30, 2018

There You Have It is the fourth commercial mixtape by American rapper Reason. It was released on May 19, 2017, and later re-released on September 28, 2018, by Top Dawg Entertainment (TDE). The album includes guest features from Xian Bell, D Beezey and Space 600. The production came from beats the rapper found on YouTube from producers SWI$H, Kampo, YONDO Beats, Nikko Bunkin, Tropical Gameboy, Deafh Beats, Classic Beats, Theopolis, Dmusic605, and Marqell O'Connor.

== Background ==
Before signing to Top Dawg Entertainment, the album was originally released on May 19, 2017, and the label later decided to re-release the album. Describing his first meeting with TDE, Reason said:

My manager Moosa took me to Top’s house. He wanted to meet with me after hearing There You Have It and to hear new music. So we played him records for an hour and a half and he didn’t nod his head, not one time. By song three I felt it was over, that we blew it. He wasn’t doing anything but texting the entire time. I played new records I was strong about, old records I was strong about, and songs from There You Have It. Nothing was working.

When discussing his different experiences with label meetings, Reason said "Every meeting, all they talked about was my social media, my YouTube numbers, my SoundCloud numbers, and then we would play music for six minutes and that would be it, Top did not bring those things up once, and we played music for an hour and a half, and we see where TDE is."

== Singles and promotion ==
On August 8, it was announced that he was signed to TDE. That same day, he released a promotional single titled "The Soul", with a music video released the next week. On August 29, he released the first single titled "Better Dayz", a song that had already made an appearance on his first mixtape. On September 11, he released the second single titled "Summer Up", also accompanied by a music video. He is also scheduled to go on tour with Jay Rock on the "Big Redemption Tour".

== Critical reception ==
Upon release of the album, HotNewHipHop said "This album is thoroughly enjoyable, and beyond some occasional rigidity in his voice, Reason sounds at home in the booth. More often than not he raps with the urgency of a man trying to keep his head above water and given the content of the music he creates it makes sense. Not only is his music about surviving the struggle, but it's simultaneously easy on the ear, which isn't always an easy feat to accomplish. [...] With the new resources at his disposal and Top Dawg's guidance, Reason is sure to be crafting a slew of new music and I'm looking forward to hearing what his proper first album under the TDE banner will sound like."

== Track listing ==
There You Have It track listing
No.	Title	Writer(s)	Producer(s)	Length
1.	"Rufus Collection (skit)"	Robert Gill		1:05
2.	"There You Have It"	Gill	SWI$H	1:53
3.	"Kurupt"	Gill	Kampo	4:48
4.	"Get It Right" (featuring D Beezey)	Gill		3:07
5.	"Fuck Wit Me"	Gill	YONDO Beats	4:10
6.	"Bottom" (featuring Xian Bell)	Gill	Nikko Bunkin	3:12
7.	"Drive Slow / Taste Like Heaven" (featuring Xian Bell)	Gill	Tropical Gameboy; SWI$H	4:41
8.	"Thirst"	Gill	Deafh Beats	3:40
9.	"Colored Dreams / Killers Pt. 2"	Gill	Classic Beats	4:26
10.	"Better Dayz"	Gill	Theopolis	5:01
11.	"Situations"	Gill	SWI$H	3:42
12.	"Not About You" (featuring Rianna)	Gill		3:37
13.	"State We In" (featuring D Beezey and Space 600)	Gill	Dmusic605	4:26
14.	"Summer Up"	Gill	Marqell O'Connor	5:06
15.	"Spring Diaries"	Gill		3:48
Total length:				56:48

2018 re-release
No.	Title	Writer(s)	Producer(s)	Length
1.	"Rufus Collection (skit)"	Gill		1:08
2.	"There You Have It"	Gill	SWI$H	1:58
3.	"Kurupt"	Gill	Kampo	4:46
4.	"Fuck Wit Me"	Gill	YONDO Beats	4:10
5.	"Bottom" (featuring Xian Bell)	Gill	Nikko Bunkin	3:12
6.	"Drive Slow / Taste Like Heaven" (featuring Xian Bell)	Gill	Tropical Gameboy; SWI$H	4:41
7.	"Thirst"	Gill	Deafh Beats	3:40
8.	"Colored Dreams / Killers Pt. 2"	Gill	Classic Beats	4:24
9.	"Better Dayz"	Gill	Theopolis	5:01
10.	"Situations"	Gill	SWI$H	3:42
11.	"State We In" (featuring D Beezey and Space 600)	Gill	Dmusic605	4:06
12.	"Summer Up"	Gill	Marqell O'Connor	4:48
Total length:				45:31
