= Childish Major =

American rapper and record producer (born 1991)

- Born: Markus Alandrus Randle; July 4, 1991 (age 34); Saint Paul, Minnesota, U.S.
- Origin: Atlanta, Georgia, U.S.
- Genres: Hip hop; trap; R&B
- Occupations: Record producer; rapper; singer; songwriter
- Instruments: Vocals; keyboards
- Years active: 2012–present
- Labels: Empire; Humility City Records

Markus Alandrus Randle (born July 4, 1991), known professionally as Childish Major, is an American rapper and record producer based in Atlanta, Georgia. He was first credited with production work on American rapper Rocko's 2013 single "U.O.E.N.O.", which peaked at number 20 on the Billboard Hot 100. He shifted into a recording career in 2015, and released his debut mixtape, Woo$ah (2017), two years later. Its lead single, "Supply Luh", was produced by J. Cole. In September 2019, he released his debut studio album Dirt Road Diamond.

He is closely affiliated with Atlanta-Baltimore music collective Spillage Village and American record label Dreamville Records, both of which house frequent collaborators JID and EarthGang.

== Early life ==
Markus Randle was born on July 4, 1991, in Saint Paul, Minnesota. He was raised in Edgefield, South Carolina. He grew up as part of a musical family and his mother sang in his grandfather's church. His father was a rapper and producer. Randle began producing beats in middle school using a program called FL Studio. He continued making beats into high school and college, eventually dropping out of college to focus on music production.

== Career ==
Childish Major moved from South Carolina to Atlanta, Georgia, in 2011 to pursue a career as a record producer. Early on in his time in Atlanta, he worked with acts like Two-9, Rome Fortune, and Spillage Village. Major was also friends with Atlanta-based producer, DJ Spinz, who signed him to his DJ and artist collective, Hood Rich. Hood Rich helped him get his first placement providing the production work for the Rocko song "U.O.E.N.O.", in 2013. The song featured Future and Rick Ross and peaked at number 20 on the Billboard Hot 100. Various remixes of the song were released with a range of artists providing additional verses, including Kendrick Lamar, ASAP Rocky, 2 Chainz, Wiz Khalifa, Trinidad James, and others. Major also produced songs by Young Jeezy ("Talk That") and Juicy J ("Ain't No Coming Down") among others in 2013.

In 2014, Major began releasing collaborative tracks with rapper Matik Estrada, including "Family Matters." This would culminate in the release of their joint EP, Community Service, in March 2015. That collection featured the song "Keep Running" with a guest appearance from Big K.R.I.T. During this time, Major also provided production work for artists like SZA ("Green Mile"), Big K.R.I.T. ("Wolf on Wall Street"), EarthGang ("Wednesday", "Thursday"), and others.

In July 2016, Major commemorated his 25th birthday with the release of the song "Happy Birthday" featuring Isaiah Rashad and SZA. He later co-produced the title track off of J. Cole's album, 4 Your Eyez Only, which was released in December 2016. In July 2017, Major released the single, "Woo$ah", and followed that with another single, "Supply Luh", in September. The latter song was produced by J. Cole and was featured on a season 2 episode of the HBO series, Insecure. Those two songs (along with "Happy Birthday") were featured on Childish Major's debut mixtape, Woo$ah, released in December 2017 by EMPIRE. In addition to Isaiah Rashad and SZA, the project featured guest appearances from 6lack, DRAM, and Hero the Band.

In 2018, Major appeared on select dates for Big K.R.I.T.'s "Heavy is the Crown" tour and Billie Eilish's "1 By 1" tour. In August of that year, Major released the single, "Know Nothing", which would be featured on the third season of Insecure. In December 2018, he released the song, "Shine". In January 2019, he was one of numerous artists to attend the studio sessions for the compilation album, Revenge of the Dreamers III, which was released in July 2019 by Dreamville Records. The following month, Major began appearing as part of Reebok's "Alter the Icons" advertising campaign, a role he continues to have as of August 2019. Beginning in February 2019, Major began releasing several songs, including "Naan", "Diet", "Good Luh" (featuring Kota the Friend), and "Framed Checks", among others.

In August 2019, Major released three singles, "For You", "Feelings Hurt", and "No Sweat" (featuring Ludacris). Those songs served as the lead singles for his studio album, Dirt Road Diamond, which was released on September 5, 2019. In addition to Ludacris, the album featured guest appearances from Olu (of EarthGang), Tish Hyman, and Buddy.

== Discography ==
=== Studio albums ===
List of studio albums with selected details
Title	Details
Dirt Road Diamond	Released: September 5, 2019; Label: EMPIRE, Humility City; Formats: Digital download

=== Mixtapes ===
List of mixtapes with selected details
Title	Details
Woosah	Released: December 15, 2017; Label: EMPIRE, Humility City; Formats: Digital download

=== EPs ===
List of EPs with selected details
Title	Details
Community Service (with Matik Estrada)	Released: March 15, 2015; Label: Independent; Formats: Digital download
Thank You, God. For It All.	Released: July 23, 2021; Label: Atlantic; Formats: Digital download

=== Singles ===
List of singles as a lead artist with selected details
Title	Year	Album
"Family Matters"	2015	Community Service
"Happy Birthday"	2016	Woo$ah
"Woosah"	2017	Woo$ah
"Supply Luh"	2017	Woo$ah
"Know Nothing"	2018	Non-album single
"Shine"	2018	Non-album single
"Naan"	2019	Non-album single
"Diet"	2019	Non-album single
"For You"	2019	Dirt Road Diamond
"Feelings Hurt"	2019	Dirt Road Diamond
"No Sweat" (feat. Ludacris)	2019	Dirt Road Diamond
"Wife You"	2020	Non-album single
"Kick It" (featuring Jace)	2020	Madden NFL 21
"Disrespectful"	2021	Non-album single

=== Production discography ===
List of production credits on selected songs
Song	Year	Artist(s)	Album
"Nibiru"	2012	Alkebulan, Alexis Glenn	Nibiru X
"Ice Cream Man"	2013	Rome Fortune	Beautiful Pimp
"DanceDance"	2013	Rome Fortune	Beautiful Pimp
"Balcony"	2013	Rome Fortune	Beautiful Pimp
"Lights I've Seen"	2013	Rome Fortune	Beautiful Pimp
"Art of Art"	2013	Rome Fortune, Candice Mims	Beautiful Pimp
"Small VVorld"	2013	Rome Fortune, Candice Mims	Beautiful Pimp
"U.O.E.N.O."	2013	Rocko, Future, Rick Ross	Gift of Gab 2
"Talk That"	2013	Young Jeezy	Boss Yo Life Up Gang
"Ain't No Coming Down"	2013	Juicy J	Smokin Session
"Neva Had Shit"	2013	Doe B	Baby Jesus
"Live Blasphemous"	2013	Joey Fatts, Action Bronson	Chipper Jones, Vol. 2
"Automatic"	2013	Curtis Williams	Half Forgotten Daydreams
"Saturday Night"	2013	Curtis Williams, Robb Bank$	Half Forgotten Daydreams
"Talk That"	2013	Jeezy	Boss Yo Life Up Gang
"WutELse"	2013	Trinidad James	10pc. Mild
"Coupes & Roses"	2013	Stalley	Self Made Volume 3
"In My Head"	2013	Jeezy	ItsThaWorld Vol. 2
"Odds"	2013	Young Dro, Forgeeauto, Mac Boney	High Times
"Wolf on Wall Street"	2014	Big K.R.I.T.	Week of K.R.I.T.
"Green Mile"	2014	SZA	Z
"Oh You Scared"	2014	Vince Staples, Jhené Aiko	Shyne Coldchain II
"Money"	2014	G Herbo, Katie Got Bandz	Pistol P Project
"Stay Da Same"	2014	Fredo Santana, Lil Reese	Walking Legend
"May Day"	2014	Curtis Williams, Childish Major	Space Danco
"1/4 Block"	2014	Jeezy	Seen It All: The Autobiography
"What You Say"	2014	Jeezy	Seen It All: The Autobiography
"Been Getting Money"	2014	Jeezy, Akon	Seen It All: The Autobiography
"Addicted"	2014	Jeezy, YG, T.I.	Seen It All: The Autobiography
"Nun But A Party"	2014	Scotty ATL, Iamsu!, B.o.B	Spaghetti Junction
"Commitment Issues"	2014	A$AP Ferg	Ferg Forever
"Money"	2014	G Herbo, Katie Got Bandz	Pistol P Project
"Play It Smart"	2014	G Herbo, Jace	Pistol P Project
"Wednesday"	2015	EarthGang	Torba
"Thursday"	2015	EarthGang	Torba
"Metropolis"	2015	EarthGang, JID	Bears Like This Too
"LeInterlude Part 1"	2015	JID	DiCaprio
"Gather Round"	2015	Two-9	B4FRVR
"Safari"	2015	Curtis Williams, Strado, KEY!, Jace	Zip Skylark
"Pretty Dirty"	2015	Miloh Smith, OG Maco	non-album single
"Gather Round"	2015	Two-9	B4FRVR
"Do The Most"	2015	Dice SoHo, Dougie F	0 Degrees
"Run The Check Up"	2015	Jeezy	non-album single
"Pressure"	2015	Two-9, LightSkinMac11	#AugustTwo9
"Extendo"	2015	21 Savage	non-album single
"No Attitude"	2015	KEY!	non-album single
"Jet Pack Blues" (remix)	2015	Fall Out Boy, Big K.R.I.T.	Make America Psycho Again
"Lately"	2016	Dice SoHo	0 Degrees
"Do the Most"	2016		0 Degrees
"Spark It"	2016		0 Degrees
"Can't Catch Me"	2016	Chris Miles	non-album single
"What Happen Luh Gangsta	2016	Trouble	Skoobzilla
"When It Go Down"	2016	Casey Veggies	Customized Greatly Vol. 4: The Return of the Boy
"Intro"	2016	KEY!, Childish Major	Before I Scream
"How It Go"	2016	Shy Glizzy	Young Jefe 2
"Run the Check Up"	2016	DJ Infamous, Ludacris, Yo Gotti, Jeezy	Talk 2 Me
"Worst Luck"	2016	6lack	Free 6lack
"Voodoo"	2016	EarthGang	Bears Like This Too Much
"Never"	2016	JID	The Never Story
"4 Your Eyez Only"	2016	J. Cole	4 Your Eyez Only
"NOLA"	2017	Kodie Shane	Big Trouble Little Jupiter
"Darkside"	2017	Quentin Miller	Essentials, Vol. 1
"Children of the Rage"	2017	OG Maco	Children of the Rage
"Hereditary"	2017	JID	The Never Story
"8701"	2017	JID, 6lack	The Never Story
"Way Out"	2017	Chaz French	True Colors
"Mary"	2017	EarthGang	non-album single
"Pink Fur"	2017	Manolo Rose	The River Jordan
"Meditate"	2017	EarthGang, JID	Rags
"Nowhere Fast"	2017	EarthGang, Childish Major	Rags
"Legendari"	2017	EarthGang	Rags
"Nothing but the Best"	2018	EarthGang, Ari Lennox	Royalty
"Communication"	2018	Arin Ray, DRAM	Platinum Fire
"HMU"	2018	Arin Ray, Childish Major	Platinum Fire
"Friends"	2018	J. Cole, Kill Edward	KOD
"Tribe"	2018	Bas, J. Cole	Milky Way
"Moments After"	2018	Leon Thomas III	Genesis
"Afternoon"	2018	Curtis Williams	America's Most Blunted
"Pull Up"	2018	J.K. the Reaper	Surrounded by Idiots
"Holding Me Back"	2018	J.K. the Reaper	Surrounded by Idiots
"Tell Me Who You Love"	2019	Jay Spice	Girls Sing Better Than I Do
"Top Down"	2019	EarthGang	Mirrorland
