= Spillage Village =

American hip hop group

- Origin: Atlanta, Georgia, U.S.
- Genres: Southern hip hop; soul
- Years active: 2010–present
- Labels: Spillage Village; SinceThe80s; Dreamville; Interscope
- Members: Johnny Venus Doctur Dot; JID; Hollywood JB; Jurdan Bryant; Mereba; 6lack; Benji
- Website: spilligion.com

Spillage Village is an American musical collective from Atlanta, Georgia. The group is composed of rappers, singers and producers, and was founded by the members of EarthGang. Spillage Village was primarily made up of five initial members with a split-base in both Atlanta and Baltimore.

== History ==
=== 2010–2015: Formation and early beginnings ===
The group was originally founded by Olu (aka Johnny Venus) and WowGr8 (aka Doctur Dot) of EarthGang, who recruited rapper JID to the group during their time at Hampton University. Brothers Hollywood JB and Jurdan Bryant joined the Spillage Village soon after. Doctur Dot and Johnny Venus approached JID after hearing his first mixtape around campus in 2010. The rest of the group also came into Spillage Village through connections including producer Hollywood JB, who met Doctur Dot at a block party and joined soon afterward. Their first mixtape as a collective, Bears Like This, was released independently on February 2, 2014. The mixtape was an exclusive project between the initial five members of Spillage Village, with no features by outside artists. Later in 2014, they announced that singer Mereba had joined the collective, along with 6lack who used to live at EarthGang’s house. A year later, Spillage Village followed up with their second mixtape, Bears Like This Too on July 6, 2015, including 6LACK and OG Maco.

=== 2016–2019: Rise in popularity and Dreamville affiliation ===
On July 29, 2016, DJ Khaled’s ninth studio album, Major Key, included a track produced by Hollywood JB titled "Jermaine's Interlude" featuring J. Cole and EarthGang. The track originally came into being after Cole invited EarthGang and JID to his studio, and Hollywood JB played him the beat. The song was later released in full as a Spillage Village single called "Can't Call It" on November 8, 2016. Spillage Village released their third mixtape Bears Like This Too Much on December 2, 2016. It soon proved to be their breakout project as a collective. Outside of the Spillage Village initial five, the album featured only three outside artists: J. Cole, Bas, and Quentin Miller. Production was from a variety of contributors, including Mac Miller, Childish Major, J. Cole, and Hollywood JB. When describing the collective mixtapes, EarthGang said: "It's the third part to the saga. We use these "Bears" projects like checkpoints, markers in time. The first one came out when we first started fucking around with these sounds. The second one came as niggas had toured a little bit, learned a little bit. At this point now, we've been on tours, we've got a lot of other things we've been working on."

In 2017, it was announced that JID and EarthGang signed to Dreamville Records. JID, EarthGang, Mereba, 6lack, and Hollywood JB all made an appearance on the 2019 Dreamville compilation album Revenge of the Dreamers III.

=== 2020: Breakthrough and Spilligion ===
In March 2020, Spillage Village announced their fourth collective album. They also announced the addition of Benji to the group, who is the brother of producer Christo. Benji previously toured with EarthGang on the Welcome to Mirrorland tour, and was invited to work on the album in 2020. Spilligion was released on September 25, 2020, and was supported by three singles: "End of Daze", "Baptize", and "Hapi". The album features guest appearances from Ant Clemons, Ari Lennox, Buddy, Chance the Rapper, Masego, Lucky Daye, and Big Rube. The production was handled primarily by Olu, Benji, Christo, and Hollywood JB, among others.

== Musical style ==
Spillage Village incorporates many genres in their music such as neo soul and elements of southern hip hop. The collective has drawn comparisons to groups such as Dungeon Family, Soulquarians, Native Tongues, and Fugees with "combinations of diverse flows, trap rap, disembodied folk, jazz and ethereal vocals" that developed a sound of their own.

== Members ==
- EarthGang (2010–present)
  - Doctur Dot – vocals (2010–present), production (2020–present)
  - Johnny Venus – vocals (2010–present)
- JID – vocals (2010–present)
- Hollywood JB – vocals, production (2010–present)
- Jurdan Bryant – vocals (2010–present)
- Mereba – vocals (2014–present)
- 6lack – vocals (2014–present)
- Benji – vocals, production (2020–present)

== Discography ==
=== Albums ===
List of albums, with selected chart positions
Title	Details	Peak chart positions
Title	Details	US
Spilligion (with JID & EarthGang)	Released: September 25, 2020; Label: Dreamville, Interscope, SinceThe80s; Format: Digital download	141

=== Mixtapes ===
List of mixtapes
Title	Details
Bears Like This	Released: February 2, 2014; Label: Spillage Village; Format: Digital download
Bears Like This Too	Released: July 6, 2015; Label: Spillage Village; Format: Digital download
Bears Like This Too Much	Released: December 2, 2016; Label: Spillage Village; Format: Digital download

=== Singles ===
Title	Year	Album
"Can't Call It" (featuring EarthGang, JID, J. Cole & Bas)	2016	Bears Like This Too Much
"M.O.M" (featuring JID & Quentin Miller)	2017	Bears Like This Too Much
"Voodoo" (featuring EarthGang)	2017	Bears Like This Too Much
"End of Daze" (with EarthGang and JID featuring Jurdan Bryant, Mereba & Hollywood JB)	2020	Spilligion
"Baptize" (with JID and EarthGang featuring Ant Clemons)	2020	Spilligion
"Hapi" (with Benji and EarthGang featuring Mereba & Big Rube)	2020	Spilligion
