= War Horse (disambiguation) =

A war horse is a horse used for fighting, including light and heavy cavalry, reconnaissance, logistical support, or in individual combat.

War Horse or Warhorse may also refer to:

- War Horse (novel), a children's novel by Michael Morpurgo
  - War Horse (play), a stage adaptation of the book
  - War Horse (film), a film based upon the book, directed by Steven Spielberg
- The War Horse, a 1927 American film by Lambert Hillyer
- Warhorse (British band), a British hard rock band
- Warhorse (American band), an American heavy metal band
- Warhorse , an album released in 2012 by the Dutch band Picture
- War Horse (American football) or Bob Hill (1891–1942), professional football player
- HMH-465 or Warhorse, a USMC helicopter squadron
- Warhorse, a novel by Timothy Zahn
- Warhorse Studios, a Czech video game company
- Warhorse, a veteran soldier
- Warhorse (wrestler), American professional wrestler
- "Warhorse" - single by American rapper 2hollis

== See also ==
- Courser (horse), a fast medieval horse ridden by knights and men-at-arms .
- Destrier, a medieval horse ridden by knights in battle and tournaments
- James Longstreet or "Old War Horse"
- Horses in the Middle Ages
- Horses in East Asian warfare
- History of the horse in South Asia
- Horses in the Napoleonic Wars
- Horses in World War I
- Horses in World War II
- History of the horse in Britain
- Horse artillery
