= Reborn (Nate Sib album) =

Studio album by Nate Sib
- Released: August 21, 2026
- Genre: Pop
- Length: 24:55
- Label: Republic
- Producers: 2hollis; Jonah Abraham; Andrew Aged; Clyde Crooks; KimJ; Adam Krevlin; Olswel; Nate Sib; Ryan Tedder

Nate Sib chronology
For Us (2025)	Reborn (2026)

Singles from Reborn
- 1. "Let You Go" Released: June 5, 2026; 2. "Face Card" Released: July 10, 2026; 3. "All I Needed" Released: August 7, 2026

Reborn is the debut studio album by the American musician Nate Sib. It was released on August 21, 2026, through Republic Records. It was preceded by the singles "Let You Go", "Face Card", and "All I Needed".

== Background ==
On June 5, 2026, Nate Sib released "Let You Go" as the first single from Reborn, alongside a music video. On July 10, Sib released "Face Card" as the second single from Reborn, alongside the official album announcement. Tom Breihan of Stereogum highlighted the song's "pickup lines and off-kilter house thumps". The song's music video, directed by Morgan Maher, was described by The Line of Best Fit as featuring "tight, restless shots that match the track's propulsion". Sib released the album's third single, "All I Needed", on August 7. Margaret Farrell of Stereogum described the song as "stunning", and highlighted the "relatable melodrama" in its lyrics.

== Reception ==
Pitchfork's Kieran Press-Reynolds wrote that Reborn's songs "teem with inventive beatmakers ... known for ecstatic pyrotechnics and halcyon sweetness", but that Sib "diverts their jagged and tasteful impulses for beats any mall-pop producer could churn out", and suggested that the album's approach is to "chase sterility".

== Track listing ==
Reborn track listing
No.	Title	Writer(s)	Producer(s)	Length
1.	"Face Card"	Jonah Abraham; Nathan Joseph Subbiondo; Billy Walsh	Abraham; Nate Sib	2:37
2.	"Let You Go"	Abraham; Clyde Crooks; Jordan Martin; Subbiondo; Ryan Tedder; Walsh	Abraham; Crooks; Olswel	1:37
3.	"Sexiest"	Abraham; Edward Gibson; Edward MacFarlane; Jack Savidge; Subbiondo; Tedder; Walsh; Alex Willner	Abraham	2:34
4.	"Love Love"	Abraham; Martin; Subbiondo; Walsh	Abraham; Olswel	2:19
5.	"Problem"	Abraham; Hollis Frazier-Herndon; Subbiondo; Tedder; Walsh	2hollis; Abraham	3:00
6.	"Shooting Star"	Abraham; Jesse Fink; Subbiondo; Walsh	Abraham; Nate Sib	2:08
7.	"All I Needed"	Abraham; Jaehyun Kim; Subbiondo; Tedder; Walsh	Abraham; KimJ; Sib; Tedder	3:07
8.	"It Ain't Easy"	Abraham; Luke Fenton; Krevlin; Subbiondo; Walsh	Abraham; Krevlin; Sib	2:11
9.	"Too"	Abraham; Andrew Aged; Subbiondo; Walsh	Abraham; Aged; Sib	2:29
10.	"Child of God"	Subbiondo; Walsh	Abraham; Sib	2:53
Total length:				24:55

== Personnel ==
Credits adapted from Tidal.

- Jonah Abraham – mixing (tracks 4, 6–10)
- Dale Becker – mastering
- Tom Norris – mixing (1–3, 5, 10)
- Sean Phelan – mixing (4, 6–9)
