= Afraid =

To be afraid is to have the emotional response of fear to threats or danger.

Afraid may also refer to:

- Afraid (film), a 2024 American film
- "Afraid" (2hollis and Nate Sib song), 2025
- "Afraid" (Mötley Crüe song), 1997
- "Afraid" (The Neighbourhood song), 2013
- "Afraid" (David Bowie song), 2002
- "Afraid", a song by Vanessa Hudgens, from her 2006 debut album, V
- "Afraid", a song by Nelly Furtado, from her 2006 album Loose
- "Afraid", a song by Medina, from her 2013 album re-release Forever
- "Afraid", a song by Nico, from the 1970 album Desertshore
