= Xperiment =

2026 studio album by Ken Carson

- Standard cover

Studio album by Ken Carson
- Released: July 3, 2026
- Genres: Rage; trap
- Length: 60:41
- Labels: Opium; Interscope
- Producers: 2hollis; 4our3va; 5star; Acog; AM; Arkman; Art Dealer; CHZ; Clif Shayne; Curesful; DJ Moon; DY Krazy; EInThisMF; F1lthy; Gab3; KP Beatz; LBW; Legion; Lil88; Lucian; Lukrative; MalikaiX8; Mental; Misogi; Nick Spiders; OMGZanoza; Outtatown; Qexotic; Sala; Skai; Ssor.t; Star Boy; Storm; Tre Pounds; Unseen; YPM Carter

Ken Carson chronology
More Chaos (2025)	Xperiment (2026)	Cartunez (2026)

Xperiment is the fifth studio album by American rapper Ken Carson, released on July 3, 2026, through Opium and Interscope Records. Xperiment has collaborations with 2hollis, Destroy Lonely, Lil Uzi Vert, Playboi Carti, and Young Thug. Carson is scheduled to embark on the Xperimenting Tour in North America from August to September 2026 in support of the album. The album received mixed reviews and earned 42,000 album-equivalent units in its first week, debuting at number seven on the US Billboard 200.

Following the release of Xperiment, a deluxe album reissue of the project titled Cartunez was issued on August 27, 2026. It has a total of 13 tracks with features from Destroy Lonely, ApolloRed1, and OsamaSon. Upon release, Cartunez re-entered the US Billboard 200 and charted at number 52 on the chart.

== Release and promotion ==
Carson began the promotional rollout for Xperiment at Rolling Loud 2026 in Orlando, Florida on May 10, 2026, which he headlined after YoungBoy Never Broke Again dropped out three days prior. During his set, Carson brought out multiple guests including Destroy Lonely, Playboi Carti, Young Thug, and Lil Tecca, and previewed unreleased music with the artists as well as a track with 2hollis. Following Rolling Loud, Carson began teasing concept merch, trailers, and art for the album on an alternative Instagram account, xperimenting0_0. On June 14, 2026, he revealed the album's release date of July 3, 2026, through a teaser trailer posted on X, which was confirmed by a pre-save link days later.

Carson teased additional music whilst performing at Summer Smash in Chicago on June 22, 2026. A USB drive became the rollout's "central motif", with featured artists sharing pictures of it on Instagram and its 22-song tracklist and unreleased material being teased through hidden drives discovered by fans in the cities of Atlanta, Los Angeles, Chicago, and New York. Carson revealed the track listing on June 30. Following three European festival performances from July to August, the Xperimenting Tour (comprising fourteen concerts across the United States) is planned to take place from August 26 to September 23; DJ Moon, Prettifun, and Xaviersobased are the planned opening acts. A special solo performance at ComplexCon 2026 on October 3 is also billed under the tour name. Following the release, a pop-up for the album was hosted in the ESSX store in the Lower East Side of New York City.

== Critical reception ==
Professional ratings
Review scores
Source	Rating
AllMusic	3.5/5 stars
Pitchfork	5.0/10
Slant	3/5 stars

Xperiment received mixed reviews from music critics. A reviewer for AllMusic praised the project, writing how it sees Carson still maintain the post-rage rap sound that he's known for, but sees him incorporate new beat and flow variations, and general approach significantly more than he has on past releases. Kyle Denis of Billboard felt that the album "solidifies [Carson] as a true niche superstar, particularly one who can converse with his fanbase in the creation of the music while still packing surprises at nearly every turn." Less favourably, Eli Enis of Pitchfork felt that Carson sounded creatively exhausted and "tired" of the rage formula that made him popular, and that his lyrical themes, producers, and guest features were "chained to the very formula that [the album] purports to deviate from". However, he praised "Deaf Note" with Playboi Carti and "Possession" for showcasing Carson as an "alluringly naughty hedonist dripping with personality and armed with the ability to make every line a memorable callout" and Young Thug and Lil Uzi Vert's appearances on "Ghost" and "Drug Kit", which he viewed as its best tracks.

Paul Attard of Slant Magazine similarly felt that Xperiment did not deviate from Carson's sound on A Great Chaos and More Chaos and that whilst he had appeal with his "snickers, vocal contortions, and dim-witted quotables with an impulsive, sneering energy", this "remains the only thing [he] does well". Enis and Attard both deemed "ShadesOn" (which features Carson rapping over an instrumental of the 2hollis song "Girl"), the album's worst track, with the former calling it "misleadingly credited" and criticizing Carson for not adapting his flows and themes to the song's production.

== Commercial performance ==
According to Luminate data reported by Billboard, Xperiment earned 42,000 album-equivalent units in its first week in the United States. The report did not break down this figure into album sales, streaming-equivalent albums, and track-equivalent albums, instead simply stating that "Essentially all of that sum is driven by [streaming-equivalent album] units" from 44.89 million on-demand official streams. It debuted at number seven on the Billboard 200 and number six on Top Streaming Albums. According to Hits data, it earned 42,549 album-equivalent units in its first week in the US, comprising 623 album sales, 41,896 streaming-equivalent albums, and 30 track-equivalent albums.

== Track listing ==
Xperiment track listing
No.	Title	Writer(s)	Producer(s)	Length
1.	"WhereDoIStart"	Kenyatta Frazier Jr.; Kendale Williams; Numair Alam	4our3va; Mental	2:43
2.	"Deaf Note" (with Playboi Carti)	Frazier; Jordan Carter; Johnny Peng	Skai	3:18
3.	"ShadesOn"	Frazier; Hollis Frazier-Herndon	2hollis	1:58
4.	"Gynecologist"	Frazier; Pierre Thevenot; Richard Ortiz; Rachad Hunter	F1lthy; 5Star; CHZ; Lukrative	2:15
5.	"Wrist"	Frazier; Jalan Lowe	Lil 88	2:50
6.	"EDM"	Frazier; Corey Moon; Daniel Denisov; Kai French; Luuk Wanmaker; Olafs Denisovs	DJ Moon; LBW; Acog; Curesful; Storm	3:28
7.	"Truth"	Frazier; Jung Cho; Tobias Dekker; Zain Siddiqui	Art Dealer; Outtatown; Misogi	2:26
8.	"OutOfMyBody"	Frazier; Ortiz; Hunter	F1lthy; 5Star; CHZ	2:01
9.	"The Ritual"	Frazier; Ivan Kuricyn; Erik Cordova	Unseen; EInThisMF	2:40
10.	"Interlude"	Frazier; Dekker; Anton Mendo	Outtatown; Star Boy	1:28
11.	"Ghost" (with Lil Uzi Vert)	Frazier; Symere Woods; Moon; Gabriel Rousseau	DJ Moon; Gab3; Arkman	3:53
12.	"Drug Kit" (with Young Thug)	Frazier; Jeffery Williams; Dwan Avery; Jeffrey LaCroix; Malikov Bulat	DY Krazy; Tre Pounds; YPM Carter	3:27
13.	"Possession"	Frazier; Ortiz; Hunter	F1lthy; 5Star	2:13
14.	"Fw00"	Frazier; Siddiqui; Arman Andican	Misogi; AM	2:42
15.	"SoManyBags"	Frazier; Keifa Carter	Legion	1:49
16.	"Shopping" (with Destroy Lonely)	Frazier; Bobby Sandimanie III; Andican; Amen Temesgen; Salahudin Ileye	AM; Malikaix8; Sala	3:59
17.	"AmandaBynes"	Frazier; Moon; French; Matthew Shalnev	DJ Moon; Curesful; OMGZanoza	2:30
18.	"Amnesia"	Frazier; Cho; Dekker; Siddiqui	Art Dealer; Outtatown; Misogi	2:20
19.	"Flamethrower"	Frazier; Nicholas Spires; Aleksandr Sarnakov	Nick Spiders; Qexotic	2:19
20.	"Knocking"	Frazier; Clifton Shayne	Clif Shayne	3:15
21.	"Addiction"	Frazier; Ortiz; Thevenot	F1lthy; Lukrative	3:16
22.	"WeDidIt" (with Playboi Carti)	Frazier; J. Carter; Kenneth Pannu; Stefan Cismigliu; Thomas Ross	KP Beatz; Lucian; Ssor.t	3:42
Total length:				60:41

Alt digital album track listing
No.	Title	Writer(s)	Producer(s)	Length
23.	"Too Many Poles"	Frazier; Corey Kerr	Clayco	1:56

=== Notes ===
- "ShadesOn" uses the instrumental of "Girl" by 2hollis
- All tracks are stylized in lowercase

== Personnel ==
These credits have been adapted from Tidal.

Technical

- Chanyong "CY" Park – additional engineering (tracks 1, 10, 12, 20–21)
- Drew Kelly – additional engineering (tracks 1, 10, 12, 20–21)
- Hayden Grant – additional engineering (tracks 1, 10, 12, 20–21)
- Liam Kachele – additional engineering (tracks 1, 10, 12, 20–21)
- Luan Ho – additional engineering (tracks 1, 10, 12, 20–21)
- Ben Lidsky – engineering (tracks 1, 5–12, 20–21); mixing (tracks 1, 3–21)
- Glenn Schick – mastering (tracks 1–22)
- Corey Moon – engineering (tracks 2–4, 13–17, 21)
- Marcus Fritz – mixing (tracks 2, 22); engineering (track 22)
- Argenis "Trilla" Peguero – engineering (track 11)
- Bainz – engineering (track 12)
- Max Lord – engineering (tracks 18–19)

== Charts ==
Chart performance for Xperiment
Chart (2026)	Peak position
Australian Albums (ARIA)	29
Australian Hip Hop/R&B Albums (ARIA)	6
Belgian Albums (Ultratop Flanders)	142
Canadian Albums (Billboard)	21
Dutch Albums (Album Top 100)	45
French Albums (SNEP)	136
German Albums (Offizielle Top 100)	47
German Hip-Hop Albums (Offizielle Top 100)	12
Hungarian Albums (MAHASZ)	19
Lithuanian Albums (AGATA)	38
New Zealand Albums (RMNZ)	24
Polish Albums (ZPAV)	26
Portuguese Albums (AFP)	45
Scottish Albums (Official Charts)	56
Swiss Albums (Schweizer Hitparade)	9
UK Albums (Official Charts)	62
UK R&B Albums (Official Charts)	2
US Billboard 200	7
US Top R&B/Hip-Hop Albums (Billboard)	2

== Reissue ==
Cartunez

Studio album (reissue) (Note: Released as part of the deluxe reissue of Ken Carson's fifth studio album Xperiment (2026).) by Ken Carson
- Released: August 27, 2026
- Genres: Rage; trap
- Length: 31:47
- Labels: Opium; Interscope
- Producers: 1kyl; 2hollis; Acog; AM; Art Dealer; Brook Beatz; Clayco; Clif Shayne; Curesful; DJ Moon; Dulio; Einthismf; EIementry; Legion; Lil88; Lucian; MaxFlames; Misogi; Oj2milly; Outtatown; Paulo; Soda; Samsson; Skai; Streehtpalm; Stormdidit; Star Boy

Ken Carson chronology
Xperiment (2026)	Cartunez (2026)	00Twinz (2026)

The album was reissued in a deluxe edition called Cartunez on August 27, 2026. Cartunez was initially intended to be a mixtape but was then expanded into a reissue of Xperiment. It features guest appearances by Destroy Lonely, OsamaSon, and ApolloRed1. Upon release, Xperiment re-entered the Billboard 200 and charted at number 52 on the charts, selling approximately 15,000 equivalent album units in its first week.

=== Background and release ===
Cartunez was announced on June 29, 2026, following an online preview of a snippet from the EP. It was intended to be released the week after Xperiment, making them back-to-back projects, but it ended up not being released on July 10.

On July 21, Carson announced the new release date for Cartunez as July 31. However, Carson failed to release the EP as scheduled. During the rollout for the EP, Cartunez merchandise was revealed to the public, and artists such as ApolloRed1, Nettspend, and OsamaSon were seen wearing it; subsequently, it was also announced through leaked messages that Nettspend would be featured on the project.

In an interview with Dimas Sanfiorenzo of Complex, Carson explained the meaning behind the project, stating, “I feel like on Xperiment, I was shying away from my natural sound. On Cartunez, I'm not really doing that at all.

After multiple setbacks, the project saw an official release on August 27, 2026, nearly two months after the release of Xperiment.

=== Composition ===
Like Xperiment, Cartunez comes from same rage blueprint, but features more humorous, energetic and comedic execution from Carson paired with livelier production compared to Xperiment. According to Eric Diep of The Needle Drop, he wrote how Cartunez features "bludgeoning beats" and "melodic shout raps".

On the opening track "Scrape", the track sees Carson's hook circulate the title name, On "Swag Jack", Olivier Lafontant of Pitchfork said the synthesizers on the track resemble that of a "confetti cannon", he called the track a "demented carnival ride". On "Rare Creature", it features 'stratospheric heights and ambient transitions" which make the track sound seraphic. On "50K", Carson employs the same thing he did on the opening track, where the title's name is repeated multiple times throughout the chorus. "Roxy Reynolds", named after the porn actress of the same name, the track features "panicky trills" and stuttering snares while Carson and Destroy Lonely go back and forth on their verses.

On "9 Bitches", the duo of Carson and ApolloRed1 take turns to repetitively taunt the rapper Nine Vicious who called out affiliates of Red's and Carson's. Lafontant wrote how Lil 88's drum work on the track "could make a set of subwoofers twerk is damn near enough for me (Lafontant) to tune out Ken’s dry Nine Vicious disses altogether." On "Vamp City" with OsamaSon, the track features both artists rapping about violence and exuding confidence; it features a "slick and catchy" chorus from Carson while OsamaSon takes the majority of the verse. Sonically, Lafontant said the track has "abrasive 808s" which makes the track sound "blistering". he also wrote how "Osama’s snotty chirp proving to be a nice foil to Ken’s muddy monotone." Like "Rare Creature", Lafontant felt the same way for the track "Yvngvmp" where he called it seraphic due to its ambient transitions and stratospheric heights that are reached with its loud decibels.

=== Critical reception ===
Professional ratings
Review scores
Source	Rating
Pitchfork	6.8/10

Upon release, Cartunez generated positive reviews from media critics. Olivier Lafontant rated the album a 6.8 out of 10, writing that the project's beats, bass, synths, vocal textures, and live-show potential are the project's biggest strengths; however, the lyricism and some of the weaker tracks hold it back from being a standout. According to Quincy Dominic of Rating Games Music, he wrote that Cartunez is a "loud, reckless, and energetic deluxe where Ken Carson proves he knows exactly what his fans want."

=== Commercial performance ===
Upon release, Xperiment re-entered the charts and Cartunez debuted at number 52 on the Billboard 200, selling approximately 15,000 album equivalent units.

=== Charts ===
Chart performance for Cartunez
Chart (2024)	Peak position
US Billboard 200	52

=== Track listing ===
Cartunez track listing
No.	Title	Writer(s)	Producer(s)	Length
1.	"Scrape"	Kenyatta Frazier; Johnny Peng; Tobias Dekker	Skai; Outtatown	2:28
2.	"Swag Jack"	Frazier; Jung Yean Cho; Keifa Carter; Arman Andican	Art Dealer; Legion; AM	2:17
3.	"Off a Bean"	Frazier; Cho; Dekker; Zain Siddiqui	Art Dealer; Outtatown; Misogi	2:10
4.	"Rare Creature"	Frazier; Ștefan Cișmigiu; Max Rafael	Lucian; MaxFlames	2:23
5.	"50k"	Frazier; Andican	AM	2:25
6.	"Roxy Reynolds" (featuring Destroy Lonely)	Frazier; Hollis Parker Frazier-Herndon; Peng	2hollis; Skai	2:40
7.	"005"	Frazier; Carter	Legion	3:20
8.	"Eaters"	Frazier; Abdul Moiz; Michael Ojha; Paulo Cornejo	Dulio; Oj2Milly; Paulo	2:08
9.	"9 Bitches" (featuring ApolloRed1)	Frazier; Jalan Anthony Lowe; Mamaev Vladislav Andreevich; Nikita Spiridonov	Lil 88; Elementry; Brook Beatz	2:58
10.	"Vamp City" (featuring OsamaSon)	Frazier; Amari Middleton; Anton Martin Mendo; Clifton Meador Shayne	Star Boy; Clif Shayne	1:50
11.	"Fake News"	Erik Cordova; Kylian Emmanuel Kante	Frazier; Einthismf; 1kyl	2:03
12.	"Disturbing the Peace"	Frazier; Erik Cordova; Corey Kerr	Einthismf; Clayco	2:13
13.	"Yvngvmp"	Frazier; Corey Moon; Kai French; Luuk Wanmaker; Olafs Denisovs; Kento Montrose	DJ Moon; Curseful; Storm; Pouritupsoda; Acog	3:00
Total length:				31:47

==== Notes ====
- Like Xperiment, the title as well as the track names are stylized in lowercase.
