= Star (2hollis album) =

Studio album by 2hollis
- Released: April 4, 2025
- Genres: EDM; hyperpop; electropop
- Length: 38:07
- Label: Interscope
- Producers: 2hollis; Jonah Abraham

2hollis chronology
Boy (2024)	Star (2025)	Pirouette (2026)

Star is the fourth studio album and major-label debut by American musician 2hollis. It was released through Interscope Records on April 4, 2025, and was met with positive critical reception. Star is an EDM, electropop, and hyperpop album with a more concise style compared to Boy.

== Background and release ==
2hollis released the single "Afraid" in January 2025, followed by the single "Style" in the following month of February. It was initially teased on Instagram, throughout the month of March. On July 30, 2025, he released the music video for "Flash," directed by Noah Dillon.

== Critical reception ==
Professional ratings
Aggregate scores
Source	Rating
Metacritic	79/100
Review scores
Source	Rating
laut.de	4/5 stars
NME	4/5 stars
The Observer	4/5 stars
Pitchfork	7.4/10
Slant Magazine	3/5 stars
Tom Hull – on the Web	B+

According to the review aggregator Metacritic, Star received "generally favorable reviews" based on a weighted average score of 79 out of 100 from five critic scores. Writing for NME, Karen Gwee gave the record a score of 4 out of 5 stars, saying "Star throws us into a universe that feels bleak and cold like its subject, hedonistic and hollow at the same time." The Observer's Kitty Empire also gave it a score of 4 out of 5, writing "There are reasons to be wary of Hollis Frazier-Herndon’s charms: this pop mainstream-facing record is made up of the most obnoxious parts of loud genres; race cars zoom and big cats growl through the album’s interstices". and Pitchfork, as well as a mixed review from Slant Magazine.

== Track listing ==
All tracks are written and produced by Hollis "2hollis" Frazier-Herndon except where noted.

No.	Title	Writer(s)	Producer(s)	Length
1.	"Beginning"			1:28
2.	"Flash"			2:44
3.	"Cope"	Frazier-Herndon; Alessandro Lindblad^{[a]}; Brian Eno^{[a]}; David Jones^{[a]}; Ebba Nilsson^{[a]}		2:46
4.	"You"			2:24
5.	"Tell Me"			3:56
6.	"Destroy Me"			2:44
7.	"Burn"			3:38
8.	"Girl"			3:06
9.	"Dream Rain Sports"	Frazier-Herndon; Jonah Abraham	2hollis; Jonah Abraham	2:08
10.	"Nice"	Frazier-Herndon; Abraham; Orlando Higginbottom	2hollis; Jonah Abraham	2:23
11.	"Nerve"	Frazier-Herndon; Abraham	2hollis; Jonah Abraham	2:56
12.	"Ego"			1:04
13.	"Sidekick"			1:18
14.	"Eldest Child"	Frazier-Herndon; Abraham	2hollis; Jonah Abraham	2:39
15.	"Safe"	Frazier-Herndon; Abraham	2hollis; Jonah Abraham	2:53
Total length:				38:07

Notes

- All track titles are stylized in lowercase
- On some streaming services, Jonah Abraham has a writing credit on every track he produced; on others, he only has a writing credit on "Dream Rain Sports"
- ^{^[a]}"Cope" contains a sample of "Heroes (We Could Be)", written by Alessandro "Alesso" Lindblad, Brian Eno, David "David Bowie" Jones, and Ebba "Tove Lo" Nilsson, and performed by Alesso and Tove Lo

== Personnel ==
Credits adapted from Tidal.

- 2hollis – vocals, production (all tracks); recording (tracks 1–8, 12, 13)
- Ojivolta – mastering, mixing
- Jonah Abraham – mixing (all tracks); production, recording (tracks 9–11, 14, 15)

== Charts ==
Chart performance for Star
Chart (2025)	Peak position
US Top Dance Albums (Billboard)	11
