= Nate Sib =

American rapper

nate sib
- Also known as: Zane Arky
- Born: Nathan Joseph Subbiondo; July 14, 2004 (age 22); Los Angeles, California, U.S.
- Genres: Alternative; electropop; hyperpop; cloud rap; electroclash; rage; EDM
- Occupations: Rapper; singer; songwriter
- Instruments: Vocals; piano
- Years active: 2020–present
- Label: Republic
- Website: natesib.com

Nathan Joseph Subbiondo (born July 14, 2004), known professionally as Nate Sib (or sometimes nate sib), is a singer-songwriter based in Los Angeles, California. He first gained attention for his 2023 single "Why can’t you see," which was included in the soundtrack for Electronic Arts' NHL 24 title.

In 2024, it was announced that Nate was performing as the opening act for both legs of 2hollis' North American tour. He released "Afraid" with 2hollis in January 2025. In February, NME named him an "essential emerging artist" for 2025. In May 2025, he released the EP For Us. In August 2026, he released his debut studio album, Reborn.

== Personal life ==
Nate grew up in a family of musicians. His father, Joe Sib, performed lead vocals for his band WAX, while also being a comedian and the co-owner of record label SideOneDummy Records. His sister, Chessa Subbiondo, is a photographer and creative director who has worked with Interscope Records, Balmain, and The Face magazine. Alongside that, she has photographed celebrities such as Sophie Thatcher and Michelle Yeoh. Chessa also directed the music video for his single "Keep It Up," released in April 2025. Nate has been playing the piano since the age of four.

== Career ==
Nate sib's first official single, "Why can't you see," produced by close friend 2hollis, was released on October 5, 2023. Using the momentum he gained from this track and its addition to the NHL 24 soundtrack, he prepared for the release of his first extended play, For You, which released on February 10, 2024. In October 2024, Nate signed with Republic Records and released "Hold On," showcasing the grittier, more distorted side of his style.

He then released "Take It Slow" as his first single of 2025 in January. Later that same month, Nate was featured on the song "Afraid" with 2hollis, helping him grow quickly in popularity as the song gained millions of streams across different platforms. In May 2025, Nate released his second EP For Us as his first under Republic Records. He stated the EP was "heavily inspired" by the hyperpop producer SOPHIE in an interview with NME, who named him as an "essential emerging artist" in 2025.

== Discography ==
=== Studio albums ===
Studio albums
Title	Album details
Reborn	Released: August 21, 2026; Label: Republic; Format: LP, CD, digital download, streaming

=== EPs ===
Extended plays
Title	Album details
For You	Released: February 10, 2024; Label: Self-released; Format: Digital download, streaming
For Us	Released: May 16, 2025; Label: Republic; Format: Digital download, streaming

=== Singles ===
Title	Year	Album
"Why Can't You See"	2023	Non-album singles
"Down"	2023	Non-album singles
"Strike"	2024	Non-album singles
"Famous"	2024	Non-album singles
"Don't Fall"	2024	Non-album singles
"Hold On"	2024	Non-album singles
"Take It Slow"	2025	Non-album singles
"Afraid" (with 2hollis)	2025	Non-album singles
"Tonight"	2025	For Us
"Keep It Up"	2025	Non-album singles
"Unconditional" (with Notion)	2025	Non-album singles
"Let You Go"	2026	Reborn
"Face Card"	2026	Reborn
"All I Needed"	2026	Reborn

== Tours ==
=== Supporting ===
- Leg One (2024) (supporting 2hollis)
- Boy EU Tour (2024) (supporting 2hollis)
- Leg Two (2025) (supporting 2hollis)
- Boy AU Tour (2025) (supporting 2hollis)
- NA Tour Leg One
- NA Tour Leg Two
- Solaris Tour (2026) (supporting Joji)
- Reborn Tour (2026)
- A Perfect World Tour EU (2026) (supporting The Kid Laroi)
