= ShadesOn =

2026 song by Ken Carson and 2hollis

Song by Ken Carson and 2hollis

from the album Xperiment
- Released: July 3, 2026
- Length: 3:18
- Label: Opium; Interscope
- Songwriters: Kenyatta Frazier Jr.; Hollis Parker Frazier-Herndon
- Producer: 2hollis

Music video
- "ShadesOn" on YouTube

"ShadesOn" (stylized in lowercase) is a song by American rappers Ken Carson and 2hollis, released on July 3, 2026, from the former's fifth studio album Xperiment. The song is a remix to 2hollis' track "Girl".

== Background ==
In his interview with Grailed, Carson explained the background recording process for the song:

I heard that song and was like “This bitch hard, let me do something.” I do that a lot [for the fans] because I don’t have a lot of leaks and shit, so people don’t hear what I’m doing til the album comes out. But yeah, 2hollis is crazy. He showed me that the “jeans” beat was named “Ken Carson type beat” [at first].

Following his interview with Grailed, Carson would appear in an interview with Dimas Sanfiorenzo of Complex in support of his collaboration with WWE. Carson explained in the interview that he wanted a song to evolve his sound. He felt rapping over a 2hollis beat would show that new direction and would showcase his ability to "step outside the box."

== Composition ==
"ShadesOn" is a one-minute and 58-second song. Carson co-wrote the song with 2hollis, who also handled the music production for the track. Additionally, Corey Moon, Glenn Schick, and Ben Lidsky handled the engineering for the track, with Schick handling the mastering while Lidsky handled the mixing. The track features Carson rapping over the instrumental of 2hollis' track "Girl". The TiVo Staff from AllMusic wrote how the track is "subdued" and "slow moving".

== Reception ==
Upon release, "ShadesOn" charted at number 15 on Billboard's Bubbling Under Hot 100 chart and number 35 on the Hot R&B/Hip Hop Songs chart, as well as number 12 on the New Zealand Hot Singles chart. The song received negative reviews from Eli Enis of Pitchfork and Paul Attard from Slant Magazine, who deemed it to be Xperiment's worst track. Enis described the song as "misleadingly credited" and criticized Carson for not adapting his flows and themes to the song's EDM production, whilst Attard felt that Carson "[sounded] bored over a year-old beat". More favourably, AllMusic found the song to be one of Xperiment's "more musically discernible moments".

== Personnel ==
Credits and personnel adapted from Apple Music.

Musicians

- Kenyatta Frazier Jr. – vocals
- Hollis Parker Frazier-Herndon - production

Technical

- Glenn Schick – mastering
- Ben Lidsky – mixing
- Corey Moon – recording

== Charts ==
Chart performance for "ShadesOn"
Chart (2026)	Peak position
New Zealand Hot Singles (RMNZ)	12
US Bubbling Under Hot 100 (Billboard)	15
US Hot R&B/Hip-Hop Songs (Billboard)	35
