= Pirouette (2hollis album) =

Studio album by 2hollis
- Released: November 11, 2026
- Genres: EDM; electropop; rage; hyperpop
- Length: 48:40
- Label: Interscope
- Producers: 2hollis; Skai; Conceal; Veil; Mk.gee; Andrew Aged; Strella; Ginseng

2hollis chronology
Star (2025)	Pirouette (2026)

Singles from Pirouette
- 1. "Hurt" Released: July 22, 2026; 2. "Sex" Released: September 18, 2026; 3. "Warhorse" Released: September 25, 2026; 4. "The Lady in Red" Released: November 13, 2026

Pirouette is the fifth studio album by American musician 2hollis. It was released through Interscope Records on November 11, 2026. Inspired by his relationship with artist and model Sirena Warren, the album features themes of love and romance.

== Background and themes ==
Some tracks included on Pirouette, such as "Daisy", circulated online as unofficial leaked versions as early as 2024. Throughout 2026, 2hollis shared songs and snippets through later-deleted Instagram posts and on SoundCloud under other pseudonyms. He also shared several cryptic videos and pictures on the side Instagram account "@pirouettepirouettepirouette". Part of the album's lead-up included a "science-fiction mythology through a cryptic, red-walled website, detailing a world of divine guardians, ancient vampyre lords and a machine capable of transforming living beings into celestial protectors. At the centre of it all is EMPRESS_1, a being whose transformation is complicated by the emergence of human emotion".

In a press release, Pirouette was described as featuring "underground experimentation, high-impact electronic production, and emotionally charged pop songwriting" and teased as a "more romantic and expressive" output. Influenced by his relationship with artist and model Sirena Warren, 2hollis stated the album was the first he made where he felt he was experiencing love. Warren previously appeared in the music video for 2hollis' song "Crush". Lady Gaga was also noted as an influence on the album, with 2hollis giving Prince and Daft Punk further shoutouts.

== Recording and production ==
Some Pirouette session files reached a density of around 300 tracks, which 2hollis noted dwarfed his previous album Star, which had session files reach around a 50-track density. 2hollis compared Pirouette's density to a Renaissance painting in his pursuit to have the listener "notice something new every minute". The album features 16 tracks. The album's production features a "harsher distortion [than in previous releases] and chaotic, clipping production". The album features collaborative production from Mk.gee, Skai, Ginseng, Andrew Aged, Strella, Veil, and Concealed.

== Music and composition ==
The album's opening track "Spring (Love Me)" is a pop-punk song, with its "raucous sound" returning throughout the record. Georgia Evans of NME wrote the album includes a tension signature of 2hollis' work, "with darkness and euphoria explored side by side". The album's opening stretch, for example, was noted by Evans to include romantic gestures. The song "Sophie" features guitars with "bright, scuzzy bombast". Evans wrote that the track starts sweetly before "before twisting into an almost power ballad-like declaration with distorted guitars and a shouted chorus". The song "Sex", meanwhile features lyrics evoking lust and voyeurism. Industrial textures are found on "Hurt" and "Eyes Wide Closed"; "Skin" and "Heaven Speaker", meanwhile, have a more "clubby" sound.

== Release and promotion ==
Following a period of hinting at new music, 2hollis announced the release of the single "Hurt" on July 20, 2026. Released alongside a music video on July 22, it was his first official release since his 2025 album Star.

2hollis announced Pirouette on September 22, 2026 through an Instagram post, featuring the album's artwork by Japanese artist Yoshitaka Amano. Known for his work on Final Fantasy and Vampire Hunter D, Amano stated that 2hollis holds a "delicate, sensitive quality" that felt reminiscent to his previously drawn characters. The announcement came shortly after the September 18 release of the single "Sex". It was followed by another single titled "Warhorse" on September 25. The single "Hurt" was also confirmed to be included on the album. 2hollis announced the album's tracklist through an Instagram post on November 6.

The album was officially released on November 11. Accompanying the album's release was a note from 2hollis on streaming platforms that read:

"Pirouette. The overwhelming feelings of the human experience. Love in its most beautiful, desperate, destructive & tender forms. The narration is through the eyes of a being named One. Sixteen vignettes. No chronology. Each song explores a different emotion. Human. The Pirouette machine".

On November 13, a music video for "The Lady in Red" was released.

== Reception ==
Professional ratings
Review scores
Source	Rating
The Needle Drop	7/10
NME	3.5/5 stars
Paste	B–
Pitchfork	7.1/10

Writing for Dazed, Tiarna Meehan wrote that: "Where 2025's Star found its footing in propulsive, club-oriented rhythms, Pirouette feels darker, sexier, and more volatile, its maximalism offset by a handful of slower, brooding tracks including "Sophie" and "Betrayal"." Meehan opined that "Daisy" was the album's best song, writing that "Trading some of the project's oppressive intensity for a spring-loaded rhythm, the track builds from an infectious bounce into a rush of soaring, high-pitched synths". NME's Georgia Evans positively reviewed the album, giving it a 3.5/5 rating.

Hattie Lindert of Pitchfork gave the album a 7.1/10 rating. Lindert noted the album's maximalism, writing "There's a whole lot of 'more' in the mix on Pirouette [...] the record is longer; the concept, a loosely technofuturist odyssey involving angel numbers and a narrator named One, is complicated enough that even his fans are SparkNotesing it". Lindert added, "It's quite the swing, but hit or miss. The scale of Hollis' ambitions can sometimes overwhelm the persona that makes him stand out in a sea of aspiring Opium signees, but Pirouette's strongest cuts give credence to the zealotry". Lindert opined that the album "works best when it builds off the electroclash-happy Star, losing the hypergaze guitar layers for something leaner and meaner", but added the album's scope led it to sound less cutting-edge, writing that its "new directions sometimes create a dummymander scenario: By spreading out across so many influences instead of innovating in his niche, this new Hollis waters down his eccentricity with some derivative choices". On its production, Lindert wrote that 2hollis is "grinding to create a multi-disciplinary catalog monumental enough to dispel every nepotism and copycat and 'aura farming' allegation he's ever fielded, but all these instrumental forays clarify that Hollis is still most at home brooding at the corner of EDM and post-WLR rage".

Giving the album a "light to decent" 7/10 rating, Anthony Fantano of The Needle Drop stated that the songwriting, sequencing, and storytelling are all superior to that of Star's. Fantano also complimented the album's production compared to Star's, opining it is "more versatile, even if some of it is a little predictable, given, some of the rage trends Hollis continues to feed into". Fantano called "Spring (Love Me)" a "fiery opener", while stating that "Daisy" is "genuinely one of the catchiest songs Hollis has ever put out. And a real, credits roll moment for the album, if you will".

== Tour ==
On October 22, 2026, 2hollis announced a 23-date "Pirouette Tour" to support the album. It is set to begin on February 5, 2027, with a total of 23 dates scheduled in North America and Europe; artists Conceal and Lucy Bedroque serve as the opening acts for the tour.

== Track listing ==
All tracks are written and produced by Hollis "2hollis" Frazier-Herndon except where noted.

No.	Title	Writer(s)	Producer(s)	Length
1.	"Spring (Love Me)"	Frazier-Herndon; KuwagataP^{[a]}	Skai	3:40
2.	"Skin"	Christian Baello	Ginseng	2:22
3.	"The Lady in Red"	Frazier-Herndon; Johnny Peng; Andrew Aged; Emma Foster^{[b]}; Daniel Norman Goldstein^{[b]}; Paul Richard Holliman^{[b]}; Andrew David Richmond^{[b]}	Skai; Andrew Aged	4:07
4.	"Pressure"			3:14
5.	"Human After All"	Frazier-Herndon; Michael Gordon; Strella; Veil	Mk.gee; Strella; Veil	3:37
6.	"Sophie"	Frazier-Herndon; Takehiro Mamiya^{[c]}; meola^{[c]}		3:54
7.	"Sex"			2:46
8.	"Hurt"			2:47
9.	"Eyes Wide Closed"	Ryan James Demma	Conceal	2:15
10.	"Betrayal"			2:57
11.	"i2i"			1:56
12.	"Warhorse"			4:00
13.	"Today"			2:25
14.	"Heaven Speaker"	Frazier-Herndon; Johnny Peng; Andrew Aged	Skai; Andrew Aged	3:19
15.	"My One and Only"	Andrew Aged	Andrew Aged	1:09
16.	"Daisy"	Andrew Aged	Andrew Aged	4:12
Total length:				48:40

Notes

- ^{^[a]}"Spring (Love Me)" contains a sample of "Flashback Sound", written and performed by KuwagataP featuring Hatsune Miku
- ^{^[b]}"The Lady in Red" contains a sample of "Road", written by Emma Foster, Daniel Norman Goldstein, Paul Richard Holliman, and Andrew David Richmond, and performed by Lane 8 and Arctic Lake
- ^{^[c]}"Sophie" contains a sample of "Palette", written by Takehiro Mamiya and meola, and performed by Yuyoyuppe

== Personnel ==
Credits adapted from Tidal.

=== Production ===
- 2hollis – songwriting, production recording, mixing
- Skai – production (1, 3)
- Ginseng – production (2)
- Andrew Aged – production (3, 14, 15, 16)
- Mk.gee – production (5)
- Strella – production (5)
- Veil – production (5)
- Conceal – production (9)
- Kayla Reagan – mixing and mastering

=== Artwork ===
- Yoshitaka Amano – art design
