= Warhorse (song) =

2026 single by 2hollis

Single by 2hollis

from the album Pirouette
- Released: September 25, 2026
- Genre: Electronic; hip-hop; rage
- Length: 4:00
- Label: Interscope Records
- Songwriter: Hollis Frazier-Herndon
- Producer: 2hollis

2hollis singles chronology
"Sex" (2026)	"Warhorse" (2026)	"The Lady in Red" (2026)

Music video
- "Warhorse" on YouTube

"Warhorse" is a song by American rapper 2hollis, released on September 25, 2026, as the third single from his fifth studio album, Pirouette. 2hollis wrote the song and handled the music production entirely by himself. Released after the announcement of his album and artwork, "Warhorse" is a rage song that's characterized by its distorted synthesizers, heavy bass, glitchy sounds, and constant repetition of drums. Its lyrics see 2hollis reflect on the themes of love and indulging in an unhealthy relationship, knowing that it may be bad for him, yet he deeply desires it.

== Background and release ==
2hollis made an appearance at the Bonnaroo festival on June 12, 2025, where he performed unreleased material, including "Warhorse". His musical activity began to slow down thereafter. In September 2026, 2hollis announced his upcoming album Pirouette, before releasing "Warhorse".

== Composition and lyricism ==
"Warhorse" is a four-minute long song. It was self-produced by 2hollis, while the mixing and mastering was handled by Kayla Reagan. Sonically speaking, "Warhorse" features distorted synths, heavy bass, glitchy sounds, and repeated drums, which make up the rage aspect of the song. Riley Basile of Melodic Magazine wrote how the track feels as if it's "four songs in one". Lyrically, 2hollis focuses on the aspects of love, where he raps about sex, violence, and insecurity, which shows the chaos and disarray in his relationship. The idea of the song is that the warhorse represents a relationship that someone longs for, despite knowing that it may hurt them.

== Critical reception ==
Writing for Melodic Magazine, Riley Basile praised the track, writing how familiar it feels despite bringing new aspects to it, it reminds her of 2hollis' Boy-era, while showcasing his growth and change since the 2024 release. Less favorably, Leah Choi of The Harvard Crimson wrote how "Warhorse" isn't the "strongest single" by 2hollis. She wrote how average the track feels despite having its memorable moments. Hattie Lindert of Pitchfork labeled the song as the "best of the bunch", while in a less favorable review of the track, Louis Pelingen wrote how the track falls short and sees 2hollis stumble lyrically across the track.
