= 9 Bitches =

2026 diss track by Ken Carson and ApolloRed1

Song by Ken Carson and ApolloRed1

from the album Xperiment - Cartunez
- Released: August 26, 2026
- Recorded: 2026
- Length: 2:58
- Label: Opium; Interscope
- Songwriters: Kenyatta Frazier Jr.; Artemus Henry; Jalan Anthony Lowe
- Producer: Lil 88

Music video
- "9 Bitches" on YouTube

"9 Bitches" (stylized in lowercase) is a song by American rappers Ken Carson and ApolloRed1, released on August 26, 2026, as the ninth track to Carson's album reissue Xperiment - Cartunez, the track serves as a diss towards rapper Nine Vicious.

== Background ==
Before the song's release, Athens rapper Nine Vicious (born Trevon Deronta O'Ryan Echols) was involved in feuds with close affiliates of Carson and others from late 2025 to early 2026. Artists that got involved were Tezzus and Opiumbaby, where the latter is a close affiliate of Carson. These events would eventually get Carson involved, which, as a result, spurred the track.

Before the release, the track was announced to be on Carson's Cartunez. Following the track list reveal, the name of the title generated responses online, leading fans to believe that the track is a diss towards the rapper.

== Composition and lyricism ==
=== Composition ===
"9 Bitches" has a runtime of two minutes and 58 seconds. Carson co-wrote the song with ApolloRed1 and Lil 88, who handled the music production for the track, while Corey Moon and Chris Clay handled the mastering and mixing. Quincy Dominic of Rating Games Music stated that the production has a great tempo, "a demonic atmosphere, and a melody that gives the chaos some structure." Olivier Lafontant of Pitchfork wrote how Lil 88's drum work on the track "could make a set of subwoofers twerk is damn near enough for me (Lafontant) to tune out Ken’s dry Nine Vicious disses altogether."

=== Lyricism ===
Lyricall, the track sees the duo of Carson and ApolloRed1 trade verse on dissing Nine Vicious, on the track, Carson sends "bloodthirsty" verses while Apollo - like Ken, mentions Vicious' ex-girlfriend, and OsamaSon, a close friend of the rapper, who was allegedly ready to "push up" at Vicious' house. Lafontant said that some of the insults sound very "middle school"-like "Boy, you sugar sweet/Honey tea," and "That white bitch you got got a Megamind" which make Lafontant cringe and shake his head. The track sees Carson and Apollo repeatedly taunt the rapper.

== Reception ==
Upon release, the track generated mixed to positive reviews from music journalists. Alexander Cole of HotNewHipHop called the track "brutal" and "fiery", while Vivian Medithi of The Fader called Apollo's "downright distasteful" due to some extreme violence and homophobic remarks. Despite the gripe, Medithi praised Apollo's vocal cadence. Quincy Dominic of Rating Games Music rated the song a four out of five, writing that the track's production was great, and that the chemistry between the two was just as good. Will Schube of Complex called the track the highlight of Cartunez. Lafontant called the beat "pressure". As of September 2026, the song has over 1.5 million streams just a few weeks after the project's release. Dimas Sanfiorenzo of Complex called the track the highlight of the Cartunez tape in his "best albums of 2026 so far" ranking.

== Personnel ==
Credits adapted from Apple Music.

Musicians

- Kenyatta Frazier Jr. – vocals
- Artemus Henry - vocals
- Jalan Anthony Lowe - production

Technical

- Chris Clay – mixing
- Corey Moon – recording
