= Style (2hollis song) =

Single by 2hollis
- Released: February 28, 2025
- Genre: Rap; dance
- Length: 1:39
- Label: Interscope
- Songwriter: Hollis Frazier-Herndon
- Producers: 2hollis; Jonah Abraham

2hollis singles chronology
"Afraid" (2025)	"Style" (2025)

Music video
- "Style" on YouTube

"Style" is a song by the American musician 2hollis, released on February 28, 2025, by Interscope Records. The song was written by 2hollis, who produced it with Jonah Abraham. It is a rap and dance song driven by bass, incorporating elements of EDM and 808 drums into its mix. Using a soft and breathy flow, 2hollis attempts to attract women attending an event in its lyrics. During the song's chorus, he switches between rapping and singing. Music journalists said the track drew similarities to Drake's 2011 song "The Motto", among other comparisons.

Upon its release, "Style" was met with positive reviews from music critics, who generally praised it as a fun and energetic track. The song was accompanied by a music video that depicts a static shot of 2hollis's bare torso with his head cropped out of the frame. The video generated discourse online from critics and fans alike.

== Background and release ==
Following the release of his third studio album, Boy, in June 2024, 2hollis signed with Interscope Records. In October, the label released his single "Gold". In January 2025, he released the single "Afraid" with Nate Sib, which was followed by "Style" on February 28, 2025, released through Interscope. "Style" was written by 2hollis, who produced it with Jonah Abraham; the latter also recorded the track. Kayla Reagan handled the song's mixing, while Hector Vega mastered it.

== Composition ==
"Style" is 1 minute and 39 seconds long. It is a bass-driven rap and dance song that incorporates elements of EDM and 808 drums into its mix. It fuses electronic music and hip-hop into its brazen and glitchy soundscape. Lyrically, the track showcases 2hollis attempting to attract women attending an event. Across the track, 2hollis uses a soft and breathy flow; during the song's chorus specifically, he switches between rapping and singing. Atop its distorted beats, 2hollis breathily states, "I like your style"; Zachary Horvath for HotNewHipHop said this made it sound like 2hollis whispered into a girl's ear while performing the line. Similarly, The Face's Davy Reed pictured 2hollis wearing sunglasses while being escorted to a club's VIP section while delivering the line "Hot boys, everybody wanna be us".

"Style" was described as "club rap" by a writer for The Face, while Aaron Williams from Uproxx felt it drew similarities to the early 2010s dubstep scene. Vivian Medithi of The Fader likened 2hollis's performance on the track to Tyga featuring Justin Bieber on an instrumental that sounds like a Dylan Brady rendition of Drake's 2011 song "The Motto". For Pitchfork, Alphonse Pierre said the track shows 2hollis "rapping exactly like Drake on 'The Motto'" and felt the song's instrumental "lifts and reworks the thumping snares and hollow snaps of old Mustard strip club anthems". Elaina Bernstein from Hypebeast viewed the track's sound as more nostalgic compared to "Afraid" and Williams likened his rapping to the music of G-Eazy. Horvath said the track displays 2hollis pulling from genres such as electropop, rage, hyphy, pop, and electronic music.

== Critical reception ==
Upon its release, "Style" was met with positive reviews from music critics. Katie Bain of Billboard selected it as one of the best dance tracks of its release week; she said the track "absolutely goes". Paper's Shaad D'Souza called it a "deliriously fun [and] endearingly sleazy" track, lauding 2hollis for having "an ear for bangers". The Fader included it in their "weekly showcase of a standout rap song". Medithi deemed it one of 2hollis's best songs and called his raps "perfunctory", likening the track to the music of Cobra Starship. He concluded his review by saying, "'Style' is a little synthetic, but that suits 2hollis just fine". Pierre described the song as "curious" and said "[2hollis is] not doing a bit; he's fully committed to the sound". He compared the song's "showy vulnerability" to the best songs from Boy. Reed expressed having "high hopes for 2hollis" and felt "Style" showcases him acting like he is a "proper celeb". Uproxx ranked it among the best songs of its release week; Derrick Rossignol thought the track contributed to 2hollis's strong 2025 start, saying it is a "fun mish-mash of electronic and hip-hop while it lasts". Horvath called the track a "truly energetic experience" and praised 2hollis for adding "a lot of swagger" to the song.

== Music video ==
"Style" was released alongside a music video. The video features a static shot of 2hollis's bare torso. A wrinkled white T-shirt and gold cross necklaces hang from his neck; his head is cropped out of the top of the frame. At one point in the video, he flips the camera off. Pierre jokingly called it the music video for D'Angelo's 2000 song "Untitled (How Does It Feel)", but for the "Twitch generation". He described the video as "ridiculous" and said he is "pretty much won over by 2hollis' serious unseriousness". Medithi jokingly said the video could be placed in Merriam-Webster's dictionary under the heading "eboy bodychecking", while Horvath said the video shows "2hollis flexing his model-like physique". Reed felt the video proves 2hollis "doesn't mind the attention too much", while Bain called it a "simple but effective" video". The video received reactions from fans claiming he is "aura farming" and acting infatuated.

== Personnel ==
Credits adapted from Apple Music.

- 2hollis – songwriter, producer, vocals, bass, synthesizer, guitar, percussion, drums
- Jonah Abraham – producer, recording, synthesizer, drums, guitar, bass, percussion
- Kayla Reagan – mixing
- Hector Vega – mastering
