= Afraid (2hollis and Nate Sib song) =

Single by 2hollis and Nate Sib
- Released: January 30, 2025
- Length: 2:58
- Label: Interscope
- Songwriters: 2hollis; Nathan Subbiondo
- Producer: 2hollis

2hollis singles chronology
"Gold" (2024)	"Afraid" (2025)	"Style" (2025)

Nate Sib singles chronology
"Take It Slow" (2025)	"Afraid" (2025)	"Tonight" (2025)

Music video
- "Afraid" on YouTube

"Afraid" is a song by the American musicians 2hollis and Nate Sib, released on January 30, 2025, by Interscope Records. Released while Sib was opening for 2hollis' Leg Two Tour, it was written by the duo as 2hollis handled its production. It is the first song 2hollis and Sib recorded together.

"Afraid" is a glitchy song that blends emo vocals with elements of cloud rap, electropop, and EDM. Its sonic palette includes synthesizers, emo melodies, a fast tempo, a piano line during the chorus, and bass. Lyrically, the song delves into commentary on the duo's fears, troubles with navigating fame, among other topics. The song was well-received by music critics, several of whom deemed it one of the best songs of its release week. The song was released alongside a music video.

== Background and release ==
After the release of his third studio album, Boy, in June 2024, 2hollis signed with Interscope Records, who released his single "Gold" in October. 2hollis and Nate Sib premiered "Afraid" on Zane Lowe's show on the Apple Music 1 radio station; it was officially released by Interscope Records on January 30, 2025. Sib served as the opening act for 2hollis' Leg Two Tour while the song was released; the two debuted the song on the tour. Sib's song "Take It Slow" preceded "Afraid" on January 17. 2hollis and Sib both wrote the song; 2hollis handled the song's production and mixing, while Mike Tucci mastered it. The song was released alongside a music video, directed by Dito Andrés, which depicts the duo performing in an abandoned warehouse and mall. It is the first song that 2hollis and Sib have recorded together.

== Composition ==
"Afraid" is 2 minutes and 58 seconds long. It is a glitchy song that blends emo vocals with elements of cloud rap, electropop, and EDM. The track's production consists of skittering and glitchy synthesizers, emo melodies, a fast tempo, and a piano line during its chorus. Davy Reed of The Face compared the song to the duo the Hellp and described its drum pattern as "simple" and "danceable". Paolo Ragusa from Consequence said the track has a "restless energy", as well as "accessible flavorings and [a] rousing groove". Lyrically, the duo open up about their fears, the challenges of navigating fame, among other topics. Underneath their crooning exists pulsating bass. Elaina Bernstein for Hypebeast described their vocals as "atmospheric" and its production as "internet-era".

== Critical reception ==
"Afraid" was ranked among the best songs of its release week by Consequence, The Face, Uproxx, and Hypebeast. Ragusa felt the song's variety of elements showcased that 2hollis and Sib are "firmly in their own lane" and that the duo's chemistry is showcased on the song. Reed said "you might just hear it in a strobe-lit arena one day". Bernstein called it a "classic 2hollis cut". For Triple J, Courtney Fry wrote that the song "subverts […] expectations of genres" and "will make you want to drop everything and send it". Derrick Rossignol for Uproxx said the song "is as glitchy as it is catchy". For HotNewHipHop, Cole Blake reported that the song received positive reception from fans under its music video on YouTube.

== Personnel ==
Credits adapted from Apple Music.

- 2hollis – songwriter, producer, mixing, vocals, bass, synthesizer, guitar, percussion drums
- Nate Sib – songwriter, vocals
- Mike Tucci – mastering
