= History of the horse in Britain =

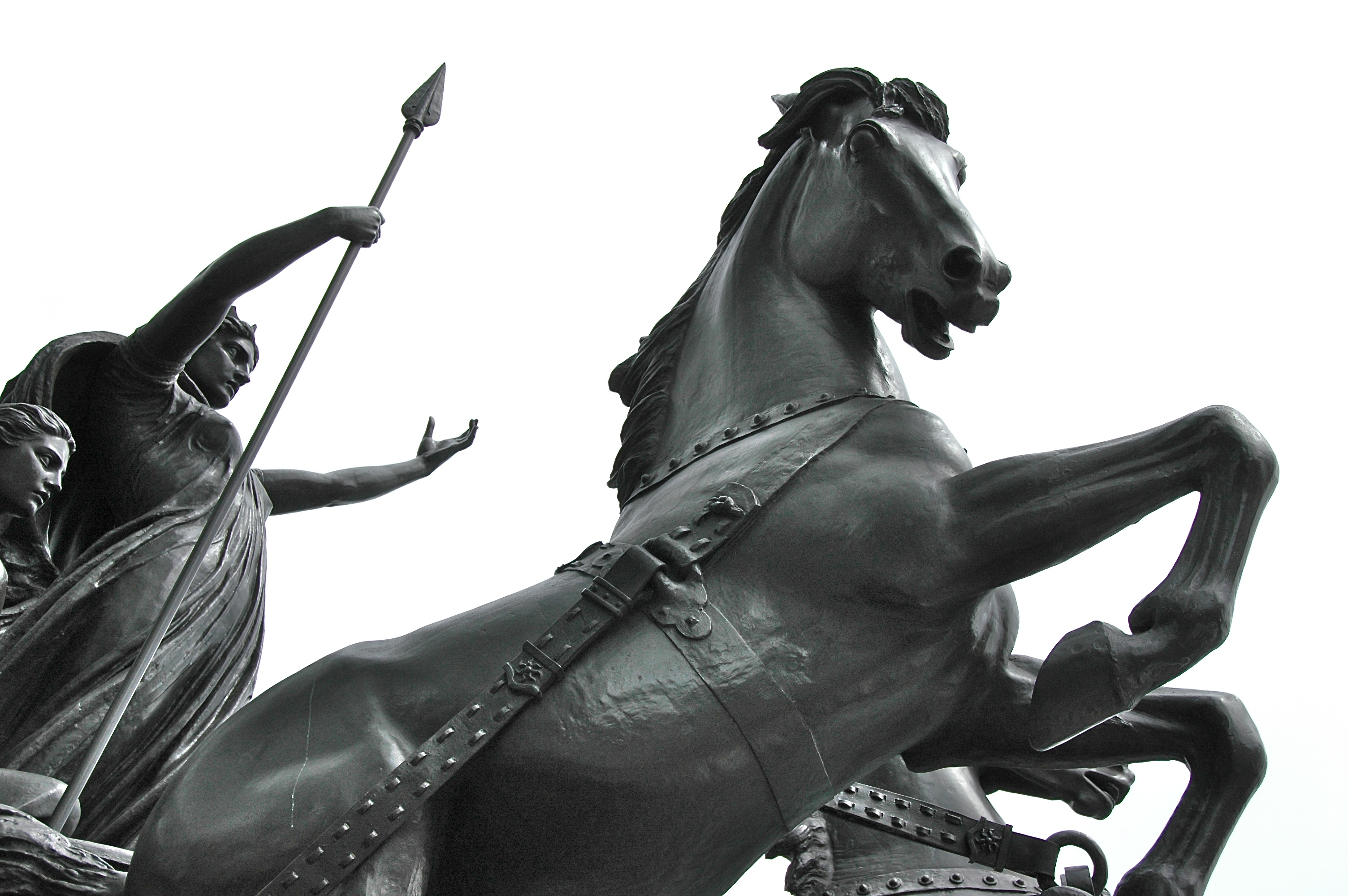
Horse detail from statue of Boudica, London

The known history of the horse in Britain starts with horse remains found in Pakefield, Suffolk, dating from 700,000 BC, and in Boxgrove, West Sussex, dating from 500,000 BC. Early humans were active hunters of horses, and finds from the Ice Age have been recovered from many sites. At that time, land which now forms the British Isles was part of a peninsula attached to continental Europe by a low-lying area now known as "Doggerland", and land animals could migrate freely between what is now island Britain and continental Europe. The domestication of horses, and their use to pull vehicles, had begun in Britain by 2500 BC; by the time of the Roman conquest of Britain, British tribes could assemble armies which included thousands of chariots.

Horse improvement as a goal, and horse breeding as an enterprise, date to medieval times; King John imported a hundred Flemish stallions, Edward III imported fifty Spanish stallions, and various priories and abbeys owned stud farms. Laws were passed restricting and prohibiting horse exports and for the culling of horses considered undesirable in type. By the 17th century, specific horse breeds were being recorded as suitable for specific purposes, and new horse-drawn agricultural machinery was being designed. Fast coaches pulled by teams of horses with Thoroughbred blood could make use of improved roads, and coaching inn proprietors owned hundreds of horses to support the trade. Steam power took over the role of horses in agriculture from the mid-19th century, but horses continued to be used in warfare for almost another 100 years, as their speed and agility over rough terrain remained unequalled. Working horses had all but disappeared from Britain by the 1980s, and today horses in Britain are kept almost wholly for recreational purposes.

== Pleistocene epoch ==
The earliest horse remains found in the area now covered by Britain and Ireland date to the Middle Pleistocene. Two species of horses have been identified from remains at Pakefield, East Anglia, dating back to 700,000 BC. Spear damage on a horse shoulder bone discovered at Eartham Pit, Boxgrove, dated 500,000 BC, showed that early hominids were hunting horses in the area at that time. The land the British Isles now comprise was periodically joined to continental Europe by a land bridge, extending from approximately the current coast of North Yorkshire to the English Channel, most recently until about 9,000 years ago. Dependent on the rise and fall of sea levels associated with advancing and retreating ice ages, this allowed humans and fauna to migrate between these areas; as the climate fluctuated, hunters could follow their prey, including equids.

Although much of Britain from this time is now beneath the sea, remains have been discovered on land that show horses were present, and being hunted, in this period. Significant finds include a horse tooth dating from between 55,000 and 47,000 BC and horse bones dating from between 50,000 and 45,000 BC, recovered from Pin Hole Cave, in the Creswell Crags ravine in the North Midlands; further horse remains from the same era have been recovered from Kent's Cavern. In Robin Hood Cave, also in Creswell Crags, a horse tooth was recovered dating from between 32,000 and 24,000 BC; this cave has also preserved one of the earliest examples of prehistoric artwork in Britain – an engraving of a horse, on a piece of horse bone. A goddess figurine carved from horse bone and dating from around 23,000 BC has been recovered from Paviland Cave in South Wales.

Horse remains dating to the later part of this period – roughly coinciding with the end of the last glacial period – have been found at Farndon Fields, Nottinghamshire, dating from around 12,000 BC. Mother Grundy's Parlour, also in Creswell Crags, contains horse remains showing cut marks indicating that hunting of horses occurred there around 10,000 BC. A study of Victoria Cave in North Yorkshire produced a horse bone showing cut marks dating from about the same time.

== Holocene period ==
The Holocene period began around 11,700 years ago and continues to the present. Identified with the current warm period, known as "Marine Isotope Stage 1", or MIS 1, the Holocene is considered an interglacial period in the current Ice Age. Horse remains dating from the Mesolithic period, or Middle Stone Age, early in the Holocene, have been found in Britain, though much of Mesolithic Britain now lies under the North Sea, the Irish Sea and the English Channel, and material which may include archaeological evidence for the presence of the horse in Britain continues to be washed into the sea, by rivers and coastal erosion.

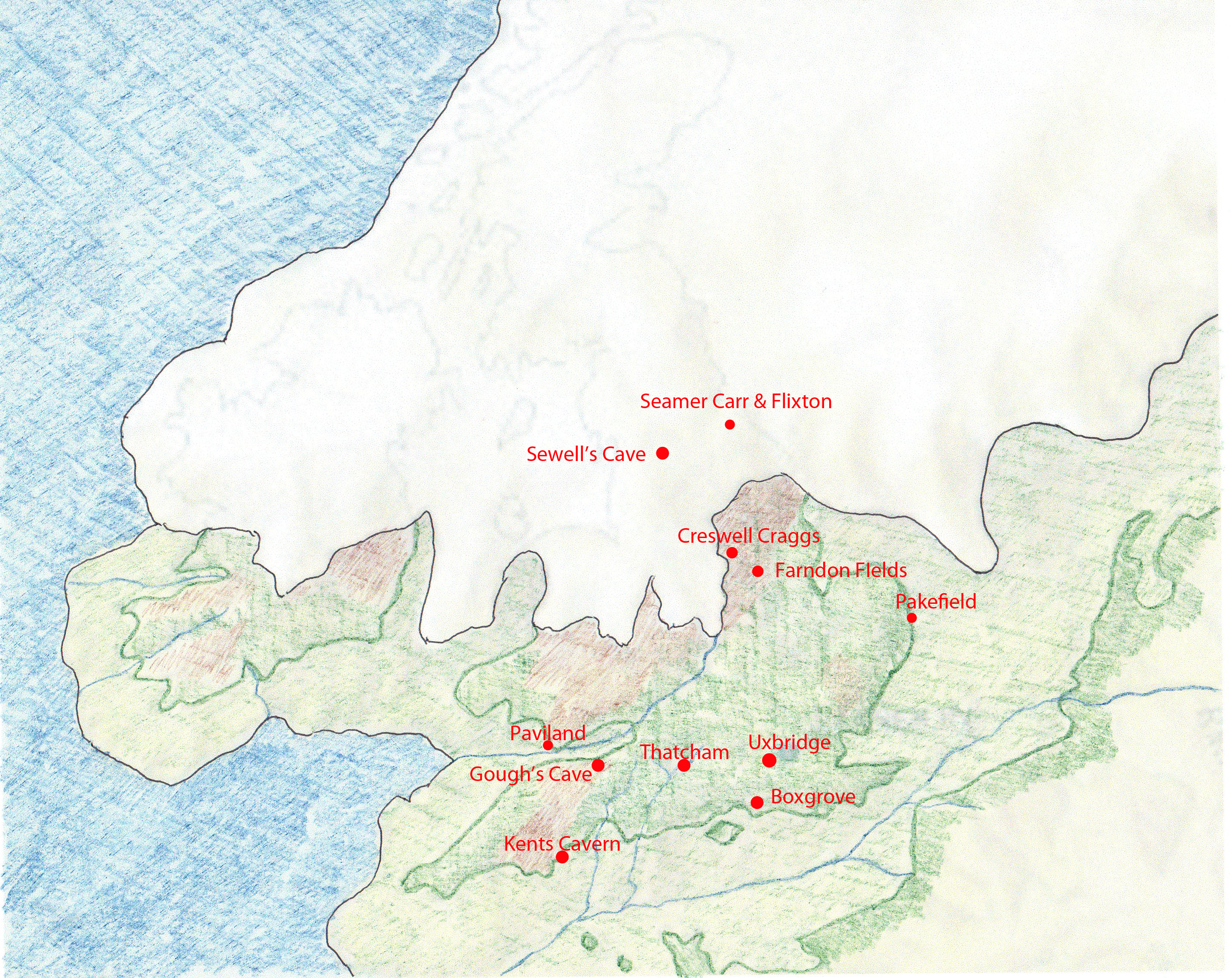
Ice Age map of the peninsula from which the British Isles were formed, showing find sites for Pleistocene and Holocene horse remains

During the Devensian glaciation, the northernmost part of the peninsula from which Britain was formed was covered with glacial ice, and the sea level was about 120 metres (390 ft) lower than it is today. This glacial ice advanced and retreated several times during this period, and much of what is now the North Sea and the English Channel was an expanse of low-lying tundra, which, around 12,000 BC, extended northwards to a point roughly parallel with Aberdeenshire, in eastern Scotland. In 1998, archaeologist B.J. Coles named this low-lying area "Doggerland", in which the River Thames flowed somewhat to the north of its current route, joining the Rhine to flow west to the Atlantic Ocean along the line of what is now the English Channel. Human hunters roamed this land, which, by about 8000 BC, had a varied coastline of lagoons, salt marshes, mudflats, beaches, inland streams, rivers, marshes, and included lakes. It may have been the richest hunting, fowling and fishing ground available to the people of Mesolithic Europe.

Horse remains dating from 10,500 to 8,000 BC have been recovered from Sewell's Cave, Flixton, Seamer Carr, Uxbridge and Thatcham. Remains dating from around 7,000 BC have been found in Gough's Cave in Cheddar.

Although there is an apparent absence of horse remains between 7000 BC and 3500 BC, there is evidence that wild horses remained in Britain after it became an island separate from Europe by about 5,500 BC. Pre-domestication wild horse bones have been found in Neolithic tombs of the Severn-Cotswold type, dating from around 3500 BC.

== Domestication in pre-Roman times ==
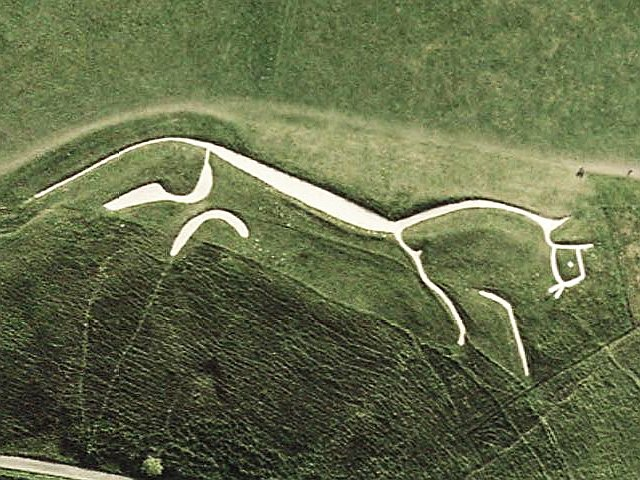
The Bronze Age Uffington White Horse hill figure

Domesticated horses were present in Bronze Age Britain from around 2000 BC. Bronze Age horse trappings including snaffle bits have been found which were used in harnessing horses to vehicles; Bronze Age cart wheels have been found at Flag Fen and Blair Drummond, the latter dating from around 1255–815 BC, though these may have belonged to vehicles pulled by oxen. Early Bronze Age evidence for horses being ridden is lacking, though bareback riding may have involved materials which have not survived or have not been found; but horses were ridden in battle in Britain by the late Bronze Age. Domesticated ponies were on Dartmoor by around 1500 BC.

Excavations of Iron Age sites have recovered horse bones from ritual pits at a temple site near Cambridge, and around twenty Iron Age chariot burials have been found, including one of a woman discovered at Wetwang Slack. The majority of Iron Age chariot burials in Britain are associated with the Arras culture, and in most cases the chariots were dismantled before burial. Exceptions are the Ferrybridge and Newbridge chariots, which are the only ones found to have been buried intact. The Newbridge burial has been radiocarbon dated to 520–370 BC, and the Ferrybridge burial is likely to be of similar date.

Towards the end of the Iron Age, there is much evidence for the use of horses in transport and battle, and for extensive trade between the inhabitants of Britain and other cultures. A collection of Iron Age artefacts from Polden Hill in Somerset includes a very large hoard of horse gear, and a rare, cast copper alloy cheekpiece dating from the late, pre-Roman Iron Age was found in St Ewe, Cornwall. The horse was an important figure in Bronze Age and Iron Age Celtic religion and myth, and is symbolised in the hill figure of the Uffington White Horse, near the Iron Age hill fort of Uffington Castle in Oxfordshire.

== Roman Britain to the Norman Conquest ==
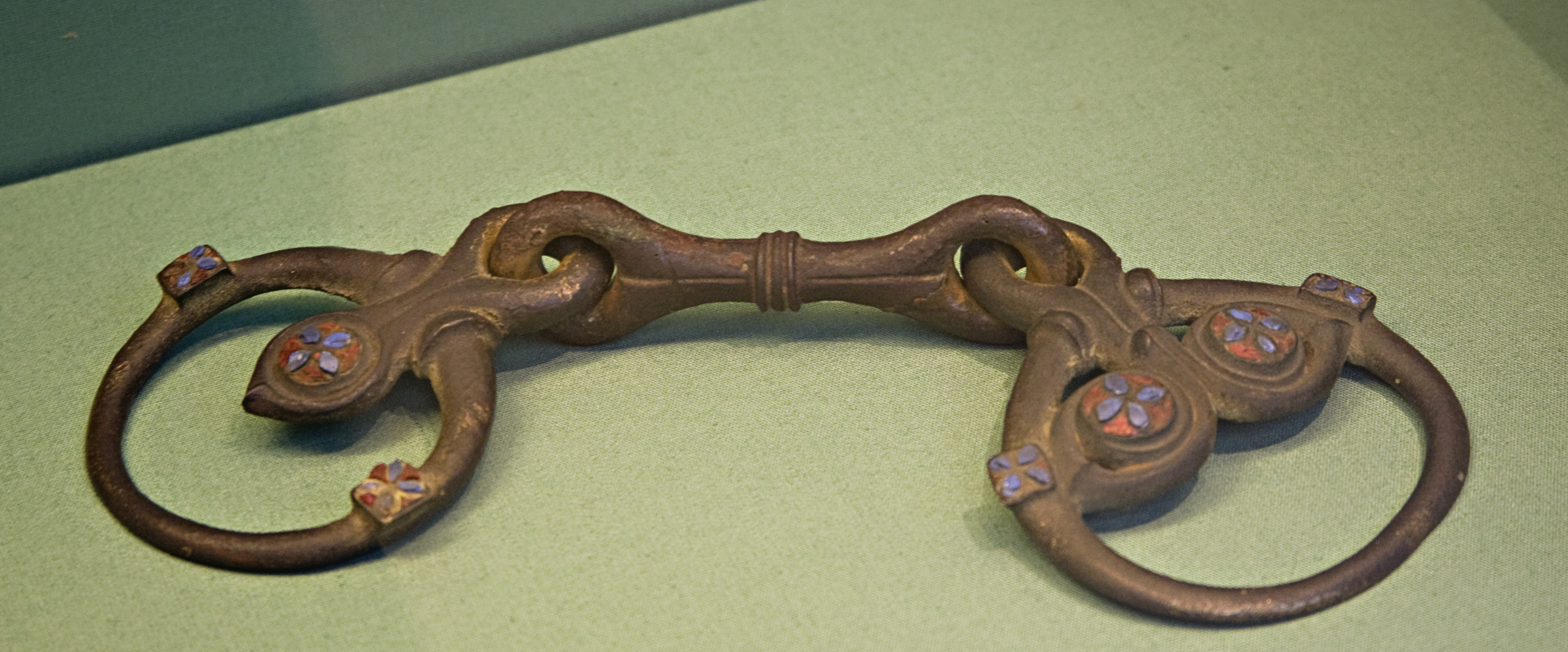
Snaffle bit, c. AD 50–100

By the time of Julius Caesar's attempted invasion of Britain in 55 BC, the inhabitants of Britain included proficient horsemen. Caesar's forces were met by British horsemen and war chariots, the chariots outfighting the Gaulish horsemen who had accompanied him. Caesar later faced organised resistance led by Cassivellaunus, with over 4,000 war chariots. To the east of the Pennines, the Romans also encountered the Gabrantovici, or "horse-riding warriors". The spread and development of horse trappings recovered from this period, such as bits, strap junctions and terrets, have been used to indicate the withdrawal of ruling groups of Britons during the Roman conquest of Britain.

A large amount of horse dung has been found in a well at a Roman fort in Lancaster, Lancashire, which was a base for cavalry units in the 1st and 2nd centuries. The bones of 28 horses have been found in a Roman well at Dunstable, Bedfordshire, which was a Roman posting-station on Watling Street, where horses would have been kept. These horses had been butchered for horsemeat; but a revival of the cult of the Celtic goddess Epona, protector of horses, donkeys and mules, may account for horse carcasses buried whole at Dunstable, with "special care". Buried with humans in a 4th–5th century cemetery, these horses represent a belief that Epona protected the dead.

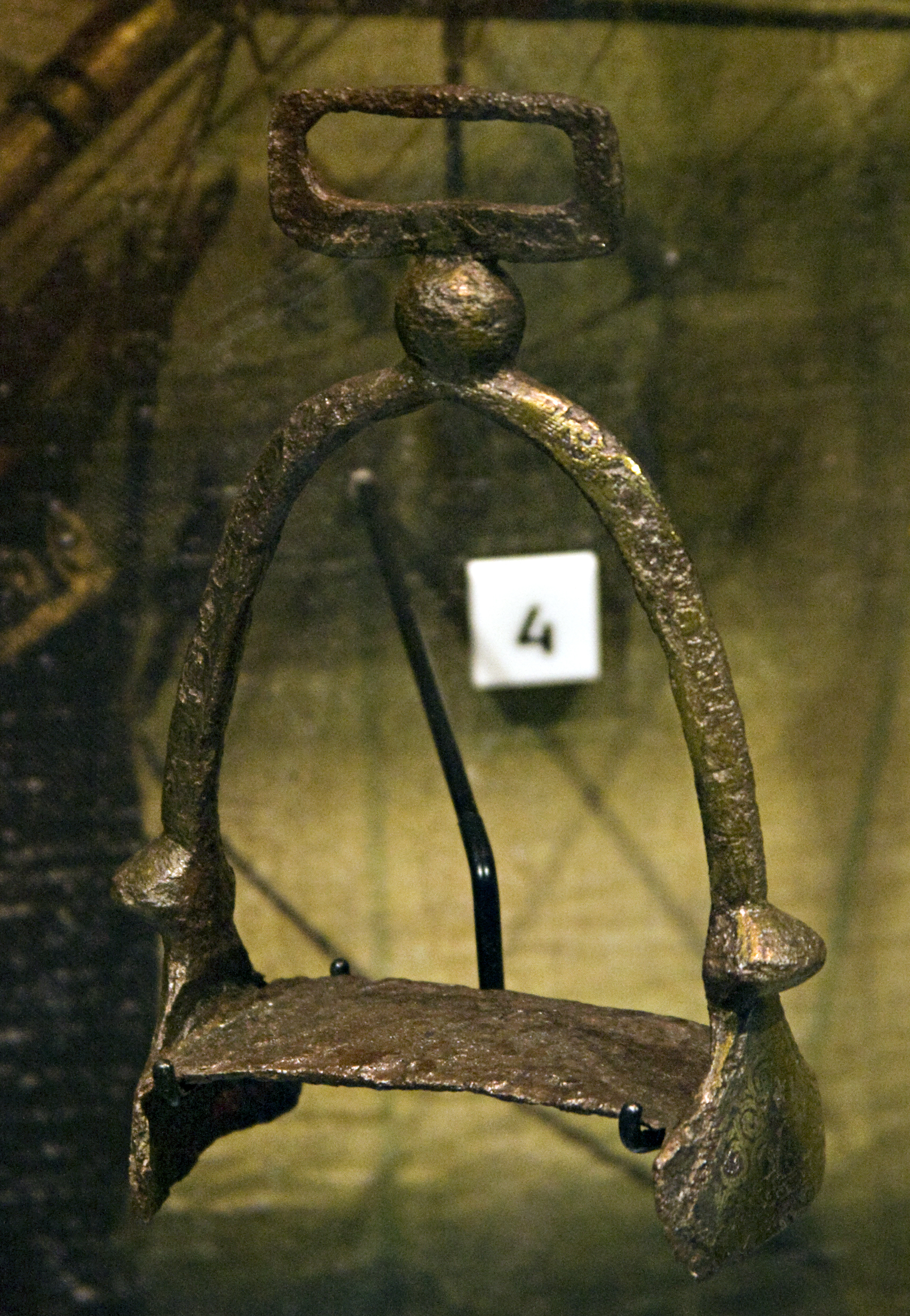
A 10th-century stirrup found in the River Thames

One of the earliest records of British horses being recognised for their quality and exported dates from the Roman era; many British horses were taken to Italy to improve native stock. Some of the earliest evidence of horses used for sport in Britain also dates from Roman times, a chariot-racing arena having been discovered at Colchester, in Essex.

From the 5th century, the role of the horse in Anglo-Saxon culture is partly illustrated by the number of words for "horse" in Old English. These distinguish between cart horses (two words), pack horses (two words), riding horses (three words), horses for breeding (three words, male and female), horses suitable for royalty and aristocracy (five words, of which three were mainly used in poetry), and warhorses (one word). There was no word for "plough horse", and no evidence that horses were used for ploughing in Anglo-Saxon times, when this was still done by ox teams; but Domesday Book records a horse used for harrowing, in 1086. Horses were used predominantly for transporting goods and people; numerous English place-names, such as Stadhampton, Stoodleigh and Studham, refer to the keeping of "studs", in this case "herds", of horses; and Anglo-Saxon stirrups and spurs have been found by archaeologists. Horses were also raced for sport, and a "race-course" in Kent is mentioned in a charter of King Eadred, dated 949.

There is some evidence that horses were occasionally eaten, perhaps in a hard winter, or ridden until five years of age and then slaughtered for meat; but there are many references in medieval sources indicating that the Anglo-Saxons placed a high value on horses. They were often included in the price paid for land and in bequests and other gifts, and kings' servants included horse-thegns, or marshals. Numerous horses and horse-breeding establishments were recorded in Domesday Book, though many more horses were probably omitted, given the need for horses for riding and pulling carts. Only 71 smiths are recorded in Domesday Book, but others "must be concealed under the heading of other classes". Six smiths in Hereford were obliged to supply 120 horseshoes each year for the maintenance of horses belonging to warriors.

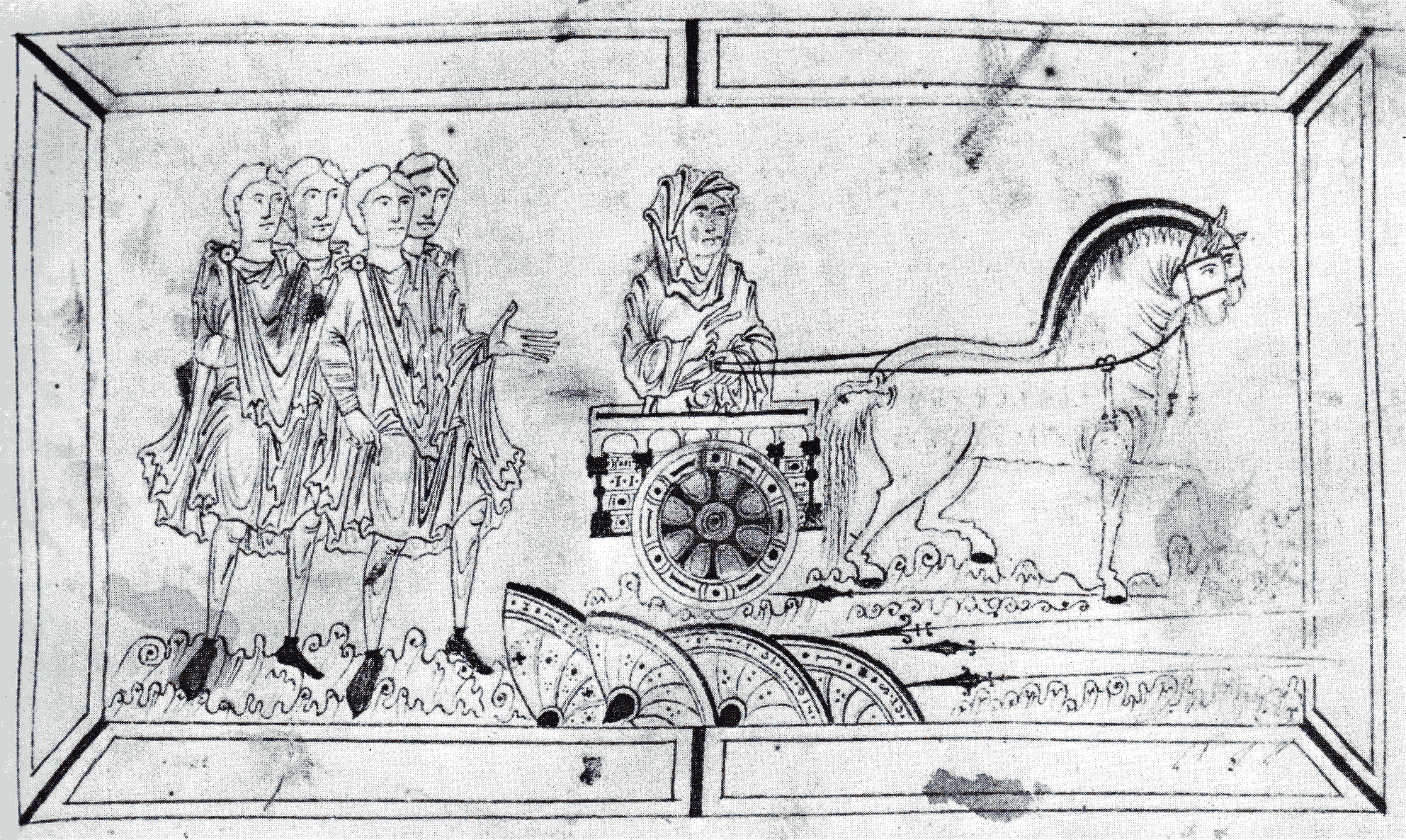
10th century Anglo-Saxon illustration of a two-horse chariot carrying Luxuria

Horses held religious significance in Anglo-Saxon paganism. The 8th-century historian Bede, of Jarrow, in Northumbria, wrote that the first Anglo-Saxon chieftains, in the 5th century, were Hengist and Horsa – Old English words for "stallion" and "horse", respectively. Modern scholars regard Hengist and Horsa as horse deities venerated by pagan Anglo-Saxons, euhemerised into ancestors of Anglo-Saxon royalty, and stemming from the divine twins of Proto-Indo-European religion, with cognates in various other Indo-European cultures.

Horses appear frequently in accounts concerning miraculous events in the context of Anglo-Saxon Christianity. In the 7th century, a horse is reported to have revealed warm bread and some meat when St Cuthbert was hungry, by pulling straw from the roof of a hut; and, when Cuthbert was suffering from a diseased knee, he was visited by an angel on horseback, who helped him to heal his knee. In the 8th century, the Anglo-Saxon Bishop Willibald of Eichstätt wrote that, when a source of fresh water was needed for a monastery on the site where St Boniface had died, in the kingdom of Frisia, the ground gave way under the forelegs of a horse, and, when the horse was pulled free, a fountain of spring water came out of the ground and formed a brook. In the 10th century, King Edmund I is reported to have been saved from death while chasing a deer on horseback when he prayed for forgiveness for his maltreatment of St Dunstan, and thereafter made him abbot of Glastonbury: the horse stopped at the edge of a cliff, over which the deer and hunting dogs had already fallen. On a later occasion, a horse fell dead under Dunstan when he heard a voice from heaven telling him that King Eadred had died.

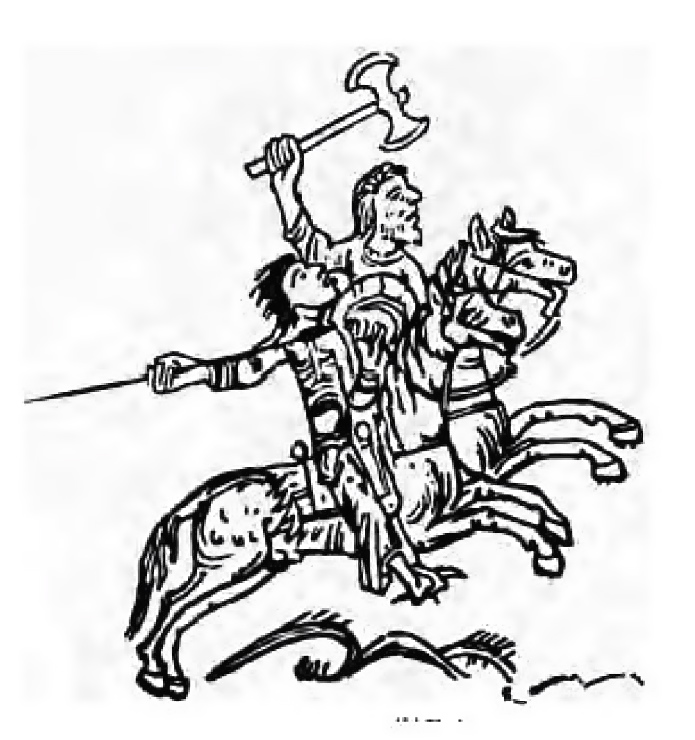
Anglo-Saxon warriors on horseback with saddles, bridles and stirrups: 11th century, before 1066

Although there is reference to Viking horsemen fighting in the 10th century Battle of Sulcoit, in Ireland, their primary use for horses in Britain – some of which they captured or seized, and some of which they brought with them – was to facilitate rapid travel. This is a central purpose for which horses were used in Anglo-Saxon England, particularly in warfare, since conflict between the various Anglo-Saxon kingdoms was carried out over long distances. In the 7th century, King Penda of Mercia, in central England, took his armies north to Bamburgh, nearly 50 miles (80 km) north of Hadrian's Wall; and Oswald of Northumbria was killed fighting the Mercians in Shropshire. These armies probably rode horses to war, and the maintenance of horses was required of many, or perhaps all, who held land under Anglo-Saxon kings. In the 7th century, an Anglo-Saxon warrior was buried with his horse at Sutton Hoo; carvings on Anglo-Saxon stone crosses feature warriors on horseback; and 62 "warhorses" are recorded in Domesday Book. In the 11th century, Anglo-Saxon warriors on horseback fought successfully against Viking, Welsh and Scottish armies, the latter including Norman allies.

Duke William of Normandy shipped horses across the English Channel when he invaded England in 1066, and the outcome of the subsequent Battle of Hastings has been described as "the inevitable victory of stirruped cavalry over helpless infantry". The Battle of Hastings took place in King Harold of England's former earldom, at the centre of his property and connections; but it came less than three weeks after he had taken an army north and defeated Norwegian invaders, under King Harald Hardrada, at the Battle of Stamford Bridge, near York. Harold of England had then been "strong in cavalry". However, that battle had seriously depleted the English king's resources in the south, and, although he re-inforced his army in London on his way to meet the Norman invaders, the force which he brought to the Battle of Hastings was smaller than that which fought at the Battle of Stamford Bridge. No English cavalry was deployed:

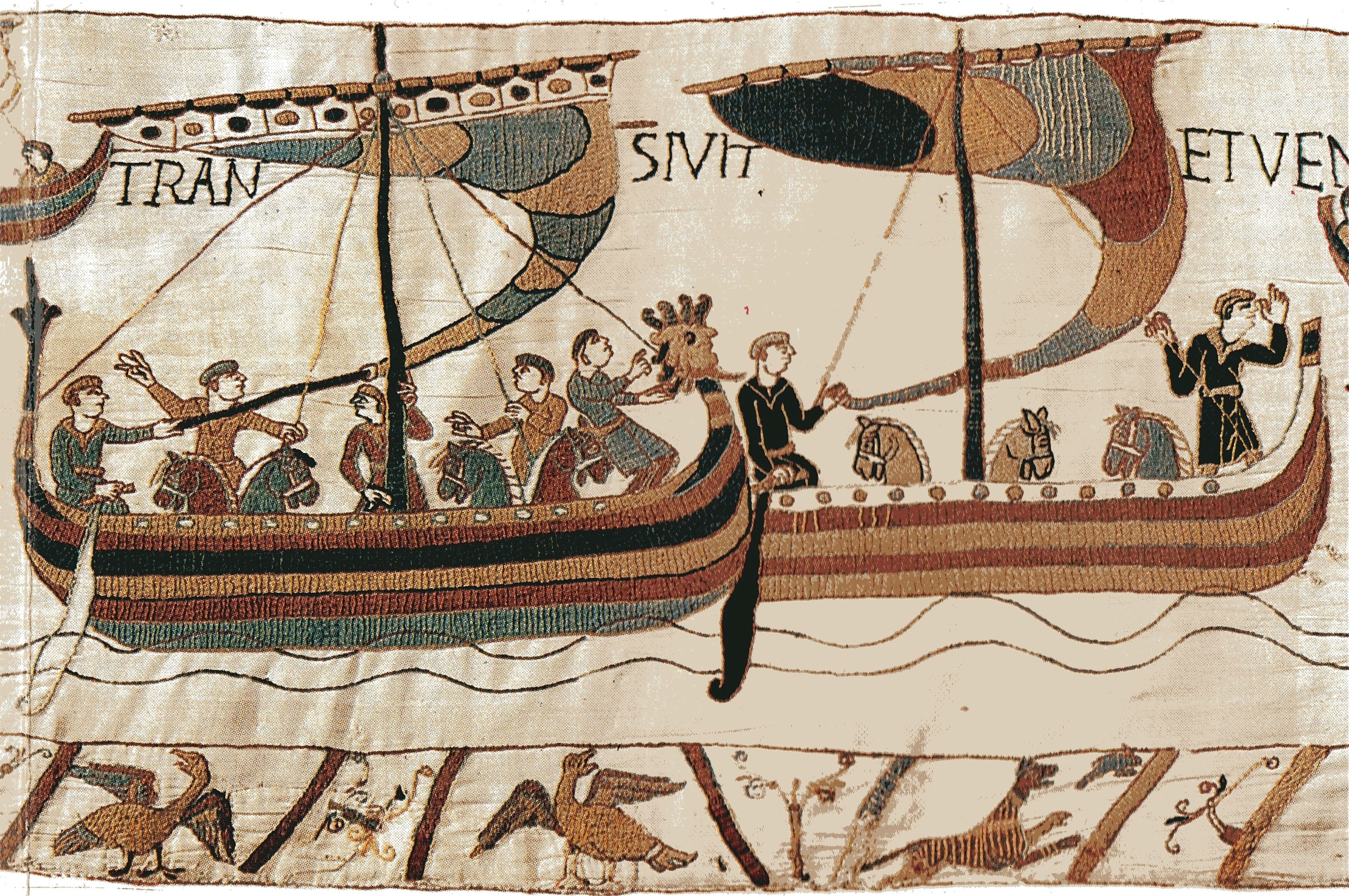
11th century Normans shipping horses to England: Bayeux Tapestry

[This] was a tactical decision... The [English] troops withstood four Norman cavalry charges before they finally broke and this may well have been due to the deaths of commanders rather than the superiority of the invaders' mounted troops.

— Times Higher Education

Although these mounted troops have been described as cavalry, their weapons and armour were similar to those of foot soldiers, and they did not fight as an organised group in the way that cavalries are normally understood to have done.

== Medieval period to the Industrial Age ==
The improvement of horses for various purposes began in earnest during the Middle Ages. King Alexander I of Scotland (c. 1078 – 1124) imported two horses of Eastern origin into Britain, in the first documented import of oriental horses. King John of England (1199–1216) imported 100 Flemish stallions to continue the improvement of the "great horse" for tournament and breeding. At the coronation of Edward I of England and his queen Eleanor of Castile in 1274, royal and aristocratic guests gave away hundreds of their own horses, to whoever could catch them.

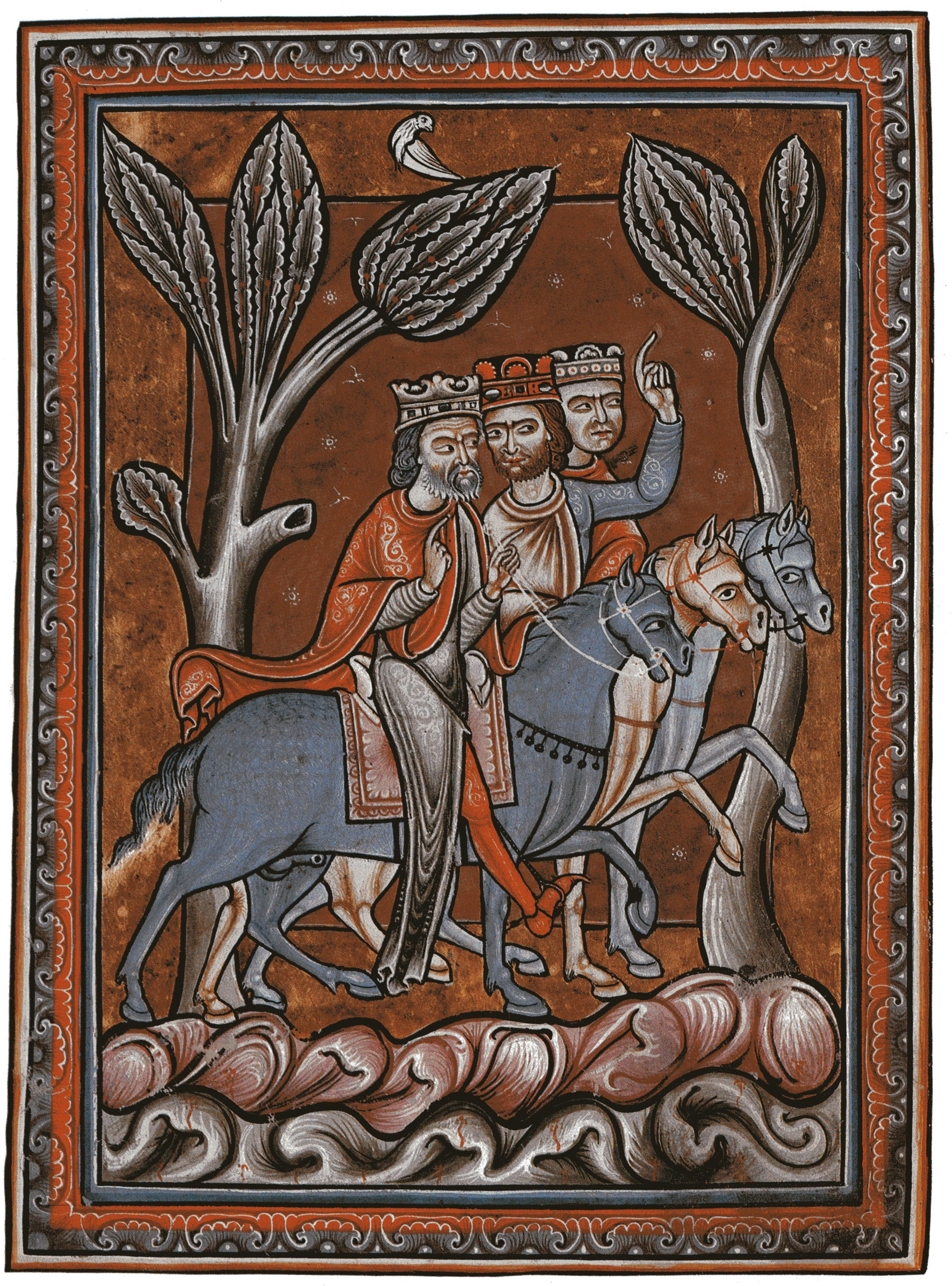
English illustration of royal horses from the 12th century

[When King Edward] was sat at his meat king [Alexander III] of Scotland came to do him service ... and a hundred knights with him, horsed and arrayed. And when they were light off their horses, they let their horses go whither they would, and they that could catch them had them to their own behoof. ... [The Earl of Pembroke and the Earl of Warenne each] led a horse by their hand, and a hundred of their knights did the same. And when they were alight off their horses they let them go wherever they would, and they that could take them had them still at their liking.

King Edward III of England (1312 – 1377) imported 50 Spanish stallions, and three "great horses" from France. He was a passionate supporter of hunting, the tournament, and horse racing, in which Spanish horses known as "running horses" were then primarily involved.

Horse ownership was widespread by the 12th century. Both tenant farmers and landlords were involved in the harrowing of land for arable crops in the relatively new open field system, and employed horses for this work. Horses and carts were increasingly used for transporting farm goods and implements; peasants were obliged to transport such items in their own carts, though the poorest may have had to rely on one horse for all their farm work. The necessity for carting produce revolutionised communication between villages. Horse-breeding as an enterprise continued; in the 14th century, Hexham Priory had 80 broodmares, the Prior of Durham owned two stud farms, Rievaulx Abbey owned one, Gilbert d'Umfraville, Earl of Angus, in Scotland, had significant grazing lands for mares, and horse-breeding was being carried out both east and west of the Pennines.

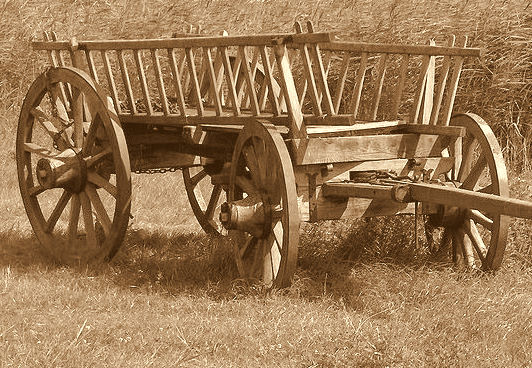
Four-wheeled wagon

The introduction of the horse-drawn, four-wheeled wagon in Britain, by the early 15th century at the latest, meant that much heavier loads could be hauled, but brought with it the necessity for horse teams capable of hauling those heavier loads over the poor roads of the time. Where loads were suitable, and the ground was exceptionally poor, pack horses had an advantage over wagons as they needed fewer handlers, were faster, and could travel over much rougher ground. By that time, post-horses were available for general hire in post-stage towns on principal routes in England. These were used by royal messengers with warrants from the Privy Council to hire horses at half price, but they would be delayed if all available horses were already engaged. In 1482, while in Scotland, King Edward IV established a temporary relay of riders between London and Berwick-upon-Tweed, which allowed messages to be transmitted within two days, and appears to have imitated a system used by Louis XI of France. London merchants established a private post-horse system for correspondence with Calais, France, in 1496. Henry VIII appointed the first British Master of the Post in 1512: he established local postmasters, whose post-boys would carry royal mail from one stage to the next on horseback, in a system which "combined elements of several European models".

By the early 16th century, horse teams were beginning to replace ox teams in ploughing work in Britain because of their greater speed, strength and agility, particularly on lighter soils; in heavier soils ox teams retained an advantage, both because they pulled more steadily, albeit more slowly, and because they could work despite being fed by grazing alone. While the horse collar, which allows a horse greater freedom to pull heavy loads, had been used in western Europe by the 10th century, and may be shown in the Bayeux Tapestry of the 11th or 12th century, the use of horse teams in Britain was made possible in part because of an increase in the farming of oats, a staple food for hard-working horses.

During the Hundred Years War of the 14th–15th centuries, the English government banned the export of horses in times of crisis; in the 16th century, Henry VII passed a number of laws relating to the breeding and export of horses in an attempt to improve the British stock, under which it was forbidden to allow uncastrated male horses to be turned out in fields or on common land; they had to be "kept within bounds and tied in stalls". This ruling caused inconvenience, and the practice of gelding horses became widespread. In 1535, Henry VIII passed the Breed of Horses Act aimed at improving the height and strength of horses; no stallion under 15 hands (60 inches, 152 cm) and no mare under 13 hands (52 inches, 132 cm) was permitted to run out on common land, or to run wild, and no two-year-old colt under 11.2 hands (46 inches, 117 cm) was allowed to run out in any area with mares. Annual round-ups on common land were enforced, and any stallion under the height limit was ordered to be destroyed, along with "all unlikely [small horses] whether mares or foals". Henry VIII also established a stud for breeding imported horses such as the Spanish Jennet, Neapolitan coursers, Irish Hobbies, Flemish "roiles", or draught horses, and Scottish "nags", or riding horses. However, it was reported in 1577 that this had "little effect"; soon after, in the reign of Queen Elizabeth I, Nicholas Arnold was said to have bred "the best horses in England".

During the successive reigns of queens Mary I and Elizabeth I, laws were introduced with the aim of reducing horse theft, requiring all sale transactions of horses to be recorded. Laws calling for swingeing culls of "under-height" horses were partially repealed by Elizabeth I in 1566. Areas of poor quality land could not support the weight of horses desired by Henry VIII, and were exempted because of "their rottenness ... [They] are not able to breed beare and bring forth such great breeds of [stallions] as by the statute of 32 Henry VIII is expressed, without peril of miring and perishing of them". This allowed many of Britain's mountain and moorland pony breeds to escape slaughter. Human population expansion in Britain during the reign of Elizabeth, and the resulting necessity for improvements in transport, increased the demand for good horses. Horse transport was so extensive at the time that on one morning alone 2,200 horses were counted on the road between Shoreditch, just north of the city of London, and Enfield, about 14.6 miles (23 km) further north.

During the Tudor and Stuart periods, horse ownership was more widespread in Britain than in continental Europe, but it suffered a decline in the harsh economic environment of the late 16th and early 17th centuries. With economic recovery, the number of horse owners increased again. Travel became more popular, along with the hiring of horses, although a common practice at the time was for a traveller to buy a horse for a journey, and then sell it on arrival at his destination. Horses had been raced in Britain for hundreds of years by the time of King James VI of Scotland (1567 – 1625), but he brought the sport as it is known today into England from Scotland while he was king of both countries (1603 – 1625); he organised public races in a number of places, and continued to import quality animals aimed at the development of a new, lighter, faster type of horse.

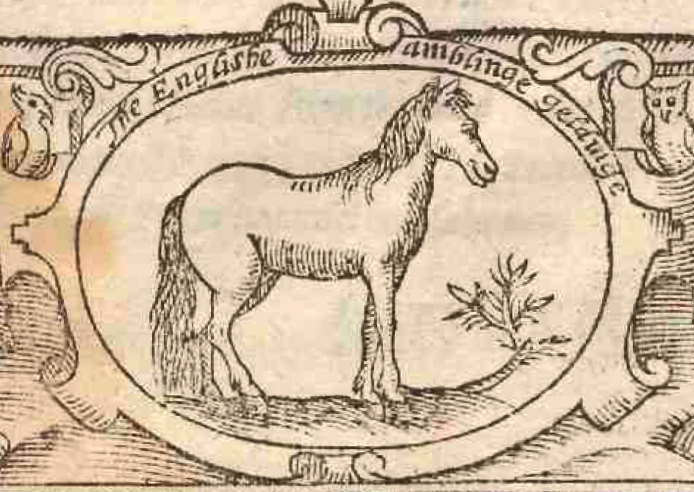
"The English ambling gelding": Gervase Markham, 1617

When Gervase Markham published his Cavalarice, or the English Horseman in 1617, farmers were not only using pack horses, farm horses and cart horses, but were also breeding horses for saddling and driving. Markham recommended crossing native horses with other breeds for particular purposes, for example suggesting Turks or Irish Hobbies as an outcross to produce riding animals, Friesland and Flanders horses to produce light driving animals, and German heavy draught horses to produce heavy haulage animals. Horse fairs were numerous, and some of the earliest mentions of specific breeds, such as Cleveland horses and Suffolk Punch horses, date from this time. Large Dutch horses were imported by King William III (1650 – 1702) when he discovered that existing cart horses did not have the strength for the task of draining the Fens. These horses became known as Lincolnshire Blacks, and the English heavy draught horses of today are their descendants. By the middle of the 17th century, the reputation of the British horse throughout Europe had become so good that, according to Sir Jonas Moore in 1703, "since the peace treaty with France, farmers had been offered by Frenchmen three times the accustomed price for their horses".

During the reign of Charles I (1625 – 1649), passion for racing and racehorses, and for swift horses for the hunting field, became the focus of horse breeding to the point that there was a dearth of the heavier horses used in tournament and for warfare. This led to complaints, as there was still a need for stronger, more powerful types of horse. The English Civil War, from 1642 to 1651, disrupted horse racing; Oliver Cromwell banned horse racing and ordered that all race horses and spectators at such an event should be seized. He concentrated on the breeding of animals suited as cavalry horses, by encouraging crossbreeding of lightweight racing horses with the heavier working horses, and effectively produced a new type of horse altogether in the warmblood. The export of any horse other than geldings was prohibited, and the ending of the war resulted in hardship for horse breeders, as demand for their horses was significantly reduced; but an illicit trade in horses flourished with wealthier Europeans, who wanted to buy from the vastly-improved British stock. It was not until 1656 that legislation removed the restrictions on horses for export. With the Restoration of the monarchy in 1660, the breeding of quality horses was begun again "from scratch".

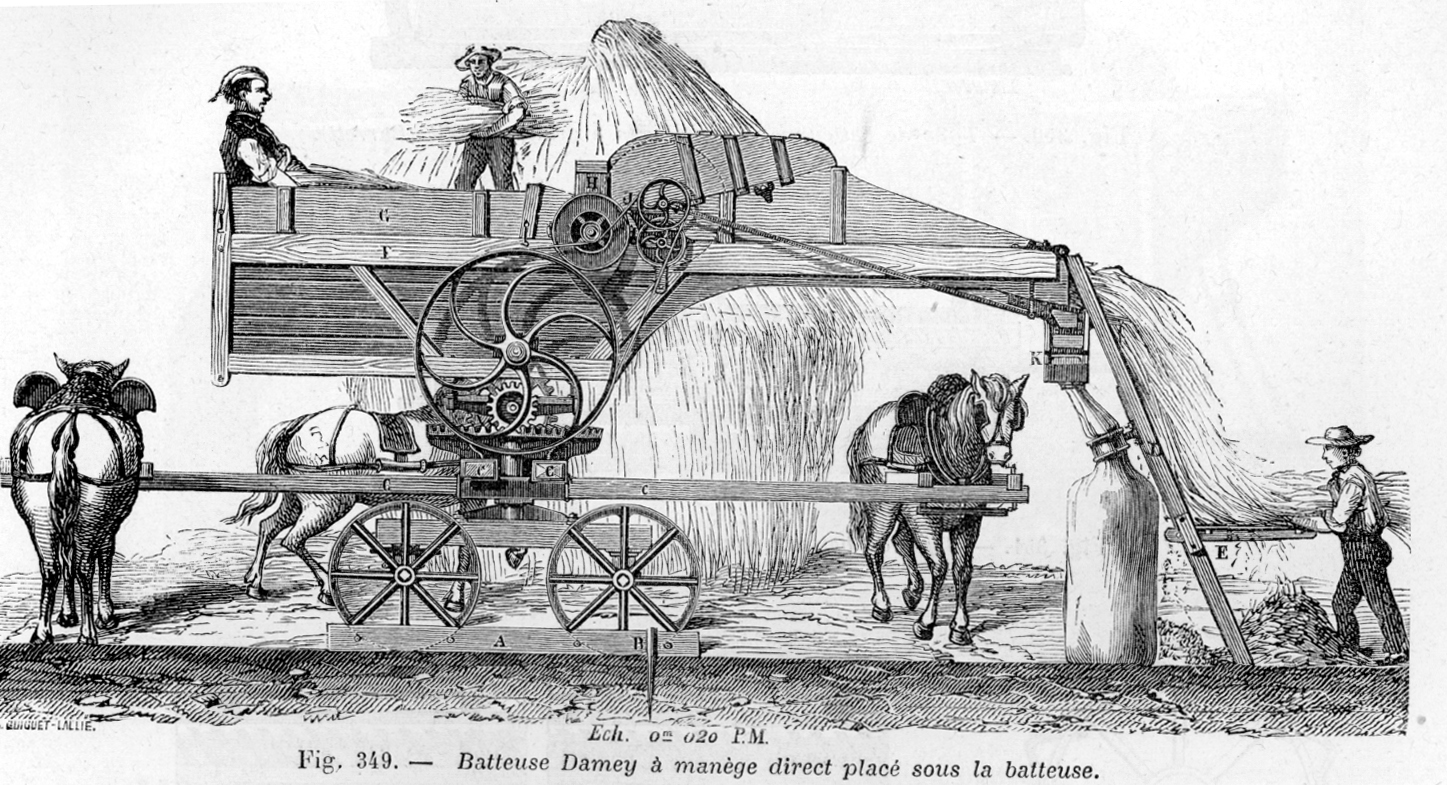
Horse-powered threshing machine

Horse-powered agricultural implements were improved during this period. By 1600, a lighter plough which could be drawn by two horses, the "Dutch plough", was used in eastern England; this was followed in 1730 by the lightweight Rotherham plough, an unwheeled, or "swing" plough. It was advertised as reducing ploughing times by a third, or using a third less horsepower for the same ploughing time. The improved seed drill and horse-hoe were invented by Jethro Tull in 1731; but it took more than 100 years for these designs to come into common use. The earliest horse-powered threshing machines, which were installed permanently in barns, were developed towards the end of the 18th century.

The use of fast horse-drawn coaches, known as 'Flying Coaches', began in 1669. Travelling between London and Oxford by coach had involved an overnight stay at Beaconsfield, but Oxford University organised a project to allow completion of the journey between sunrise and sunset. The project succeeded, and was quickly copied by Cambridge University; by the end of Charles II's reign, in 1685, Flying Coaches ran three times a week from London to all major towns, in good conditions covering a distance of around fifty miles in a day. The Thoroughbred horse was developed from about this time, with native mares being crossbred to Arab, Turk and Barb horses to produce excellent racehorses; the General Stud Book, giving clear and detailed pedigrees, was first published in the 1790s, and the lineage of today's Thoroughbred horses can be traced with great accuracy to 1791. Horses running in races sponsored by the monarchy then carried weights of around 12 stone (76 kg), more than the usual weight of 8–10 stone (51–64 kg), indicating that horse racing, hunting and chasing partly originated in a need for military training.

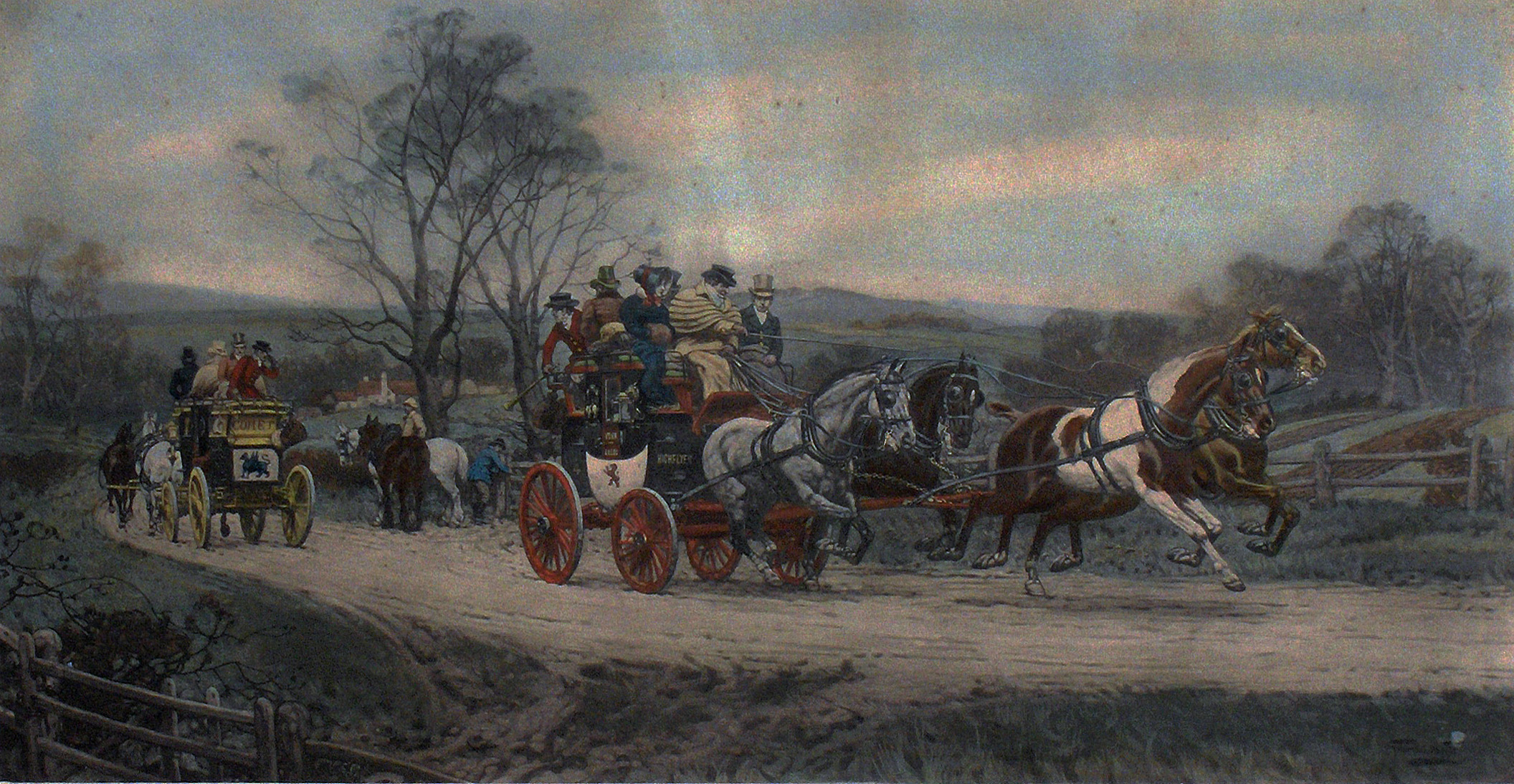
The Age of Coaching

The Mail coach service began towards the end of the 18th century, adding to the existing use of fast coaches. The horses required for fast coaches were mainly produced by outcrossing heavy farm mares to the lighter racing type of horse, as a combination of speed, agility, endurance and strength was required. While the aristocracy and gentry paid high prices for matched teams of quality horses, farmers sold the best of their animals at a good profit, keeping lower-quality animals for themselves, or for sale as saddle horses. The coaching trade grew from the trade in carriage of goods; some public transport was provided by farmers, who could keep large numbers of horses on their own farms more cheaply than those who had to buy in food and forage. However, proprietors of coaching inns accounted for most of the trade. In many cases a proprietor would work his horse teams only in his local district, but some owned many coaching establishments, and could provide transport over much greater distances. An advantage to proprietors of a string of coaching inns was that passengers on their coaches also used and paid for the services offered by their inns, often including overnight accommodation. Some inn proprietors owned hundreds of horses.

== 19th and 20th centuries ==
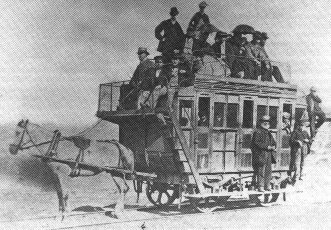
Horse-drawn passenger vehicle on the Swansea and Mumbles Railway in 1870

Horses remained the primary source of power for agriculture, mining, transport and warfare, until the arrival of the steam engine. The Middleton Railway had been established for industrial use by an Act of Parliament in 1785; Parliament also allowed the construction of the Surrey Iron Railway, intended to carry goods, in 1801, and the Oystermouth Railway, later known as the Swansea and Mumbles Railway, in 1804. These initially used horse-drawn vehicles, but developments in steam engines made them cheaper to run than horses, and more useful as a source of locomotive power on railways. The Swansea and Mumbles Railway was the first to carry paying passengers, from 1807, and was soon followed by many others, with Parliament passing around one new railway Act per year until 1821. By 1840, numerous railway lines had been laid, forming networks such as that created by George Hudson; the number of rail miles expanded from 1,497 in 1840 to 6,084 by 1850, and horse-drawn passenger coaches became virtually obsolete over long distances.

Use of the steam engine also began to make the horse redundant in farm work. In a letter to The Farmer's Magazine in 1849, Alderman Kell of Ross-on-Wye, Herefordshire, commented that "[enough] ... has been said, although perhaps not mathematically correct, to show that horses are kept at vast expense in comparison with a steam engine that eats only when it works". With the invention of the portable steam engine in the 1840s, which was promoted by the Royal Agricultural Society, steam-powered machines could be used on small farms. One man could invest in a portable machine, and recoup the cost by hiring it out for haymaking and harvest; the only use for horses here was to move the machine from one place to another. There were about 3.3 million horses in late Victorian Britain. In 1900 about a million of these were working horses, and in 1914 between 20,000 and 25,000 horses were utilised as cavalry in WWI.

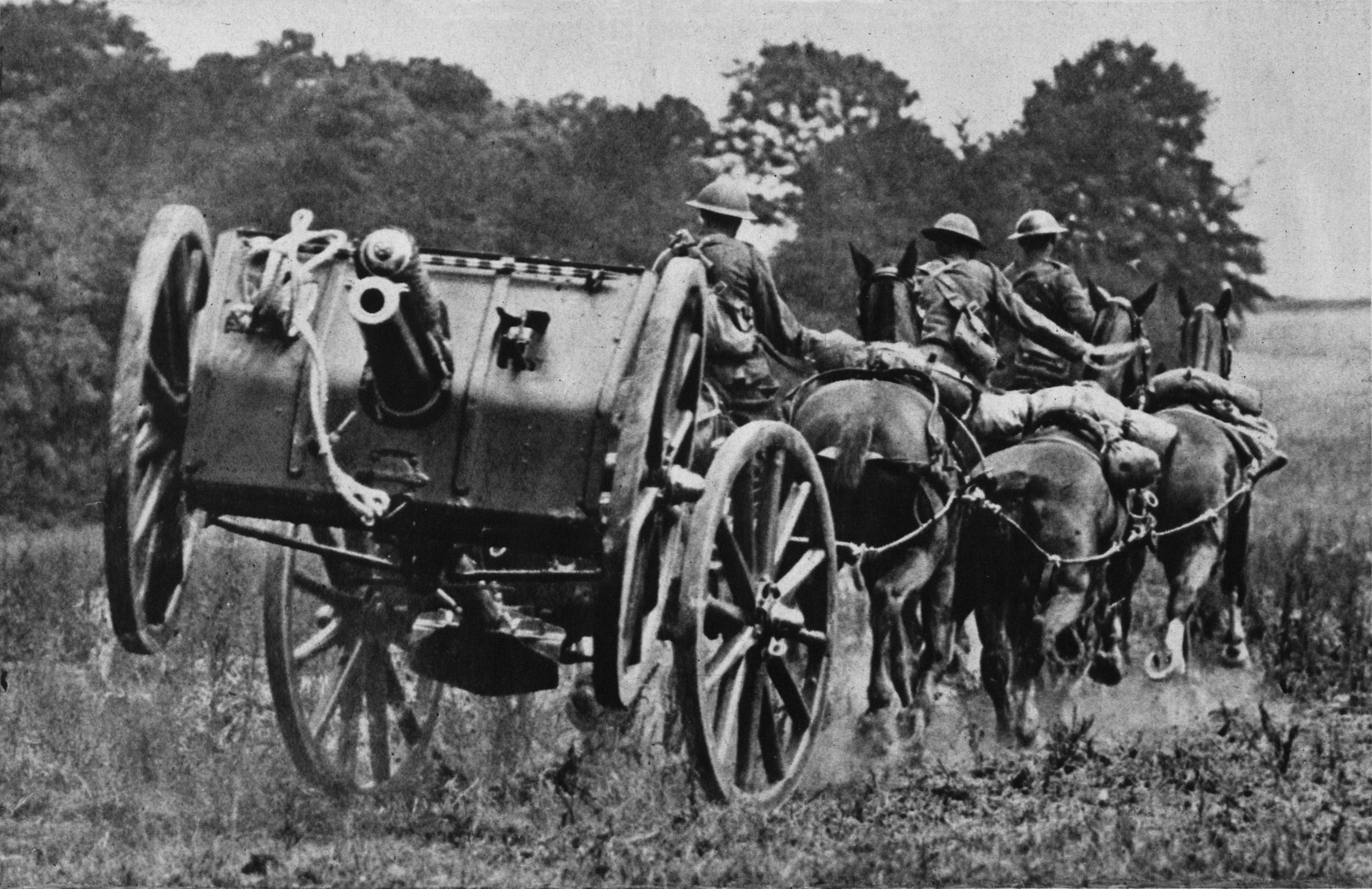
Six-horse Royal Horse Artillery team with 13-pounder cannon at speed, World War I

Horses and ponies began to be used in Britain's mining pits in the 18th century, to haul "tubs" of coal and ore from the working face to the lifts, in deep mines, or to the surface in shallower mines. Many of these ponies were Shetlands, as their small size was combined with great strength. A stud farm for the sole purpose of breeding ponies for the pits was established in 1870 by colliery owner Frederick Stewart, 4th Marquess of Londonderry, and the Shetland Pony Stud Book Society was formed in 1890 to stop the use of the best stallions in the pits. By 1984, only 55 pit ponies were being used by the National Coal Board in Britain, chiefly at the modern pit in Ellington, Northumberland. A horse called "Robbie", probably the last to work underground in a British coal mine, was retired from a mine at Pant y Gasseg, near Pontypool, in May 1999.

In the First World War, horses were used in combat for cavalry charges, and they remained the best means for moving scouts, messengers, supply wagons, ambulances, and artillery quickly on the battlefield; the horse could refuel itself to some extent by grazing, and could cope with terrain which was beyond machines of the time. However, this war had a devastating effect on the British horse population. As thousands of animals were drafted for the war effort, some breeds were so reduced in number that they were in danger of disappearing. Many breeds were saved by the dedicated efforts of a few breeders who formed breed societies, tracking down remaining animals and registering them.

== 21st century ==
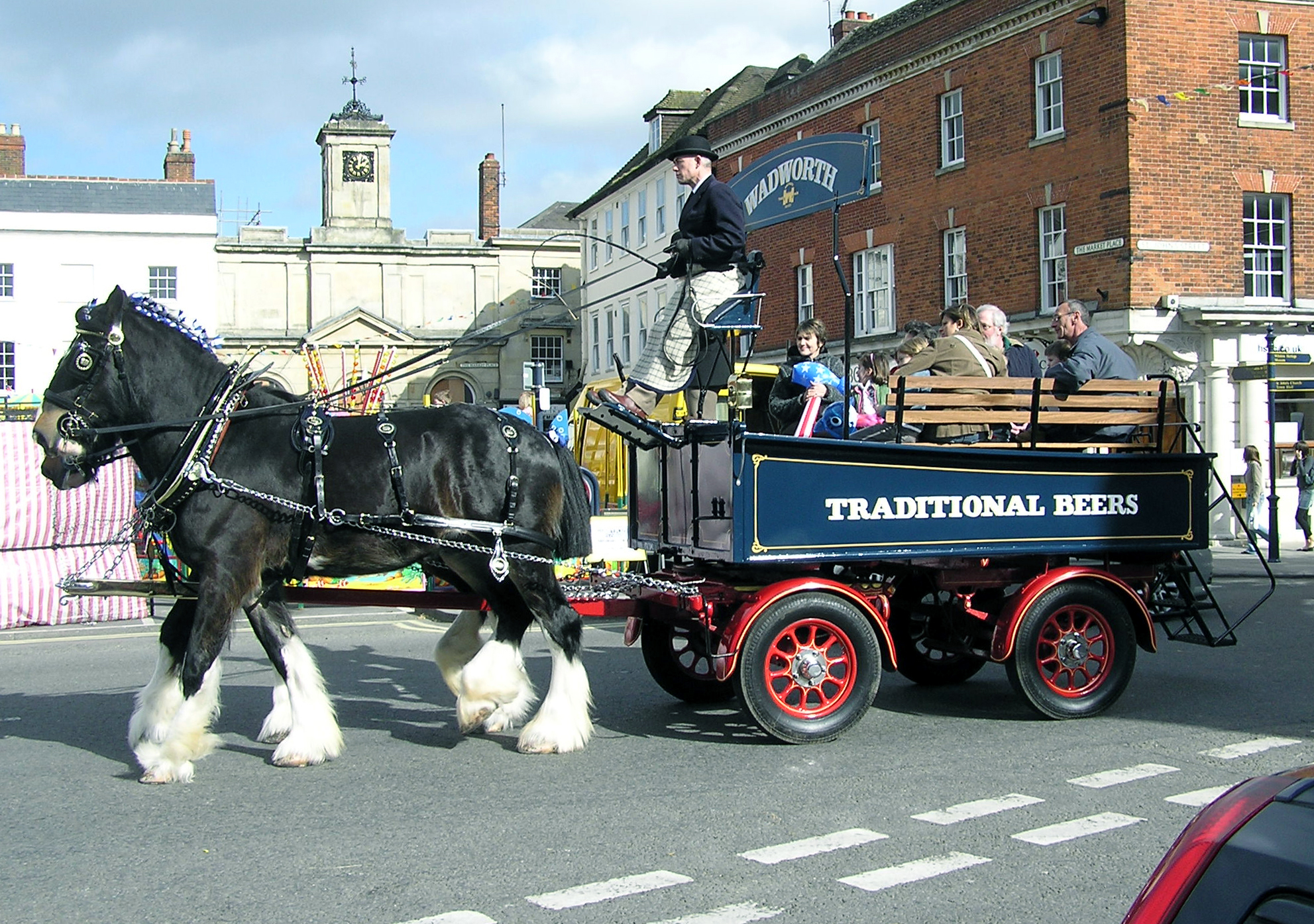
Wadworth Brewery's Shire horses pulling a dray in 2007

Working horses all but disappeared from Britain's streets by the 21st century; among few exceptions are heavy horses pulling brewers' wagons, or drays. However, when Young's Brewery ceased brewing in Wandsworth, London, in 2006, it ended more than 300 years' use of dray horses by the brewery: its team of Shire horses was retired from delivery work and given a new career with the head horsekeeper, offering heavy horse team driving as a recreational event, although they continue to appear at opening ceremonies for new Young's pubs and other publicity events. There are still working brewery horses in other areas, such as Wadworth Brewery's Shire horses in Devizes, Wiltshire, but working teams are becoming increasingly rare. In some areas, such as the New Forest, local farmers and commoners use horses to round up thousands of semi-feral ponies grazing on the open Forest during the drift season, and Britain's mounted police use horses in crowd control, but other than such niche areas, the horse in Britain today is kept almost entirely for recreational purposes. They compete in all equestrian disciplines, carry riders from novice to advanced on trekking and trail-riding holidays, work in riding schools, provide therapy for the disabled, and are much-loved companions and hacks. The horses and riders of Great Britain have won numerous medals for eventing in equestrian sports at the Summer Olympic Games.
