= 2hollis =

American rapper and producer (born 2004)

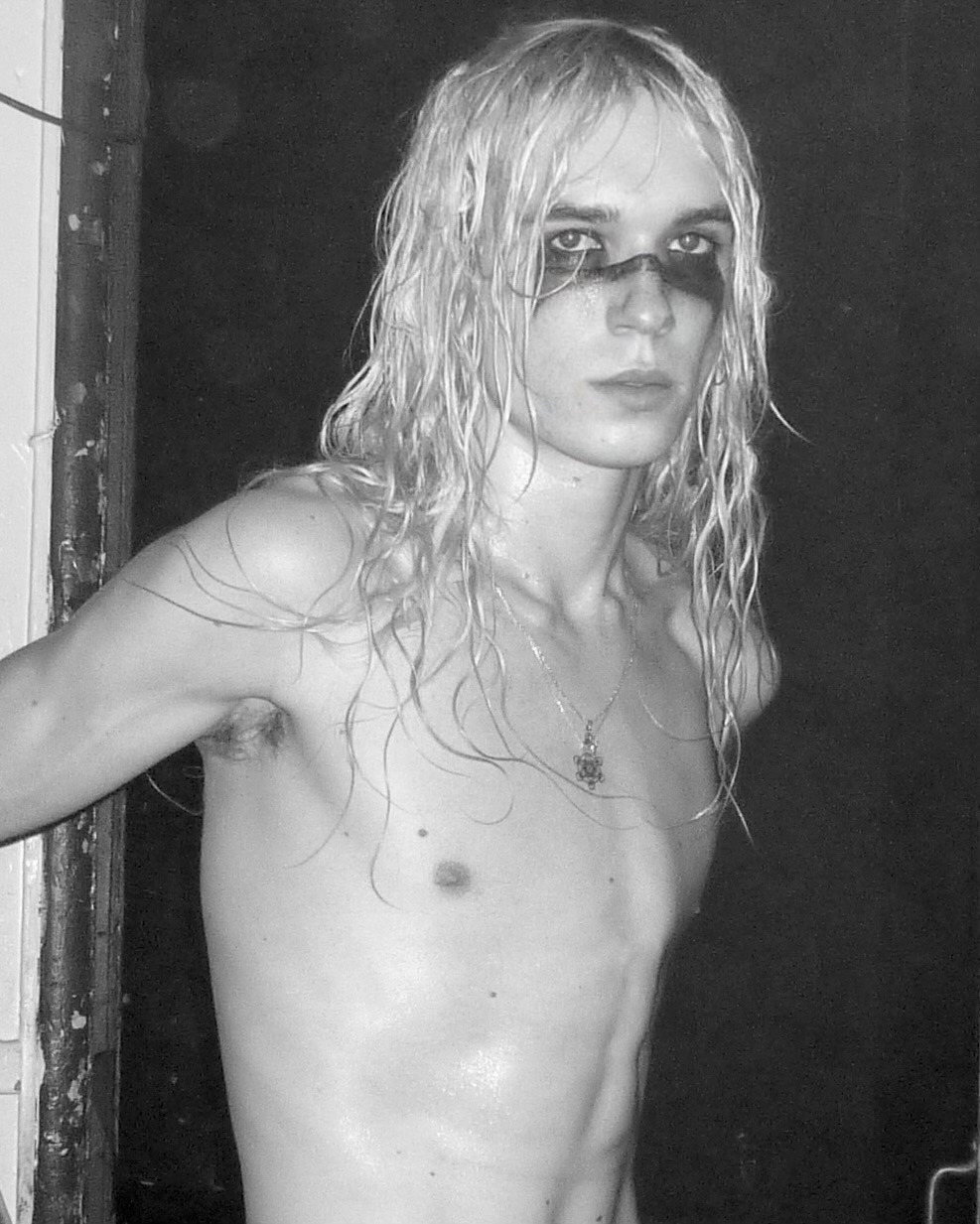
- 2hollis in 2024

Background information
- Also known as: Drippysoup; Cross; SecretRare; Hermetic Boy
- Born: Hollis Parker Frazier-Herndon; January 5, 2004 (age 22); Chicago, Illinois, U.S.
- Genres: Experimental hip-hop; electropop; rage; EDM; electroclash
- Occupations: Rapper; singer; record producer; songwriter
- Instruments: Vocals; synthesizer
- Years active: 2018–present
- Label: Interscope
- Formerly of: OSX
- Partner: Sirena Warren
- Website: 2hollis.life

Hollis Parker Frazier-Herndon (born January 5, 2004), known professionally as 2hollis, is an American rapper, singer, and producer from Chicago, Illinois. Known for his energetic self-produced music, he saw success in the underground SoundCloud scene with his first three records. Titled White Tiger (2022), 2 (2023), and Boy (2024), which were self-released. The latter enjoyed an increased level of success, leading to his signing with Interscope Records. Through Interscope, he released his fourth album, Star, in 2025. His fifth album, Pirouette, released on November 11, 2026.

== Early life ==
Born January 5, 2004, in Chicago, Frazier-Herndon's father is musician John Herndon (also known as A Grape Dope), drummer of the band Tortoise. His mother is Kathryn Frazier, founder of public relations firm Biz 3 and co-founder of record label Owsla. He lived in Chicago until he was around ten years old, at which point his family moved to Los Angeles. His childhood home burnt down during the January 2025 Southern California wildfires. When he was eleven, his parents purchased an Ableton subscription for him, and he began utilizing YouTube tutorials, as well as Reddit forums and Discord servers to learn the software.

== Career ==
Frazier-Herndon began producing music in high school, under the alias "Drippysoup" in 2018. His first song with vocals was an aggro-rap song titled "girl scout", which he made in ninth grade. He later changed his stage name to 2hollis. After high school, his parents encouraged him to attend music school. He briefly moved to Chicago before enrolling in Evergreen State College in the state of Washington, where he dropped out after less than a month.

During this period, Hollis wrote music in a medieval fantasy style, creating the group Open Swords of Ten (commonly abbreviated to OSX). His first songs were described as "medieval trap" by 032c. His early work under the Drippysoup name featured glitchy, distored, and medieval jauntiness, being described as "glitchcore over Chicago drill beats (picture Chief Keef wearing cat ears)" by Clash's Eleni Leokadia. He released his debut album White Tiger in 2022, and followed it up with 2 in 2023. His 2023 song "Poster Boy" was included as part of EA Sports FC 24's soundtrack. He gained further popularity in 2024, after the release of singles such as "crush" and "jeans" and the subsequent release of his third studio album, Boy.

Frazier-Herndon performed as the opening act for Ken Carson's 2024 The Chaos Tour. He embarked on his North American Leg One tour in 2024 and his Leg Two tour in 2025. In 2025, he released his album Star, which coincided with a tour that began later in the year. Frazier-Herndon's 2025 single "Afraid", featuring Nate Sib, made The New York Times' Best Songs of 2025 list. Reviewer Jon Caramanica called it a "relentlessly preppy hyperelectropop bomb". On July 3, 2026, Frazier-Herndon's track "girl", from his 2025 album Star, was remixed by Ken Carson on "ShadesOn", the second track off of his 2026 project Xperiment. In March 2026, 2hollis released a concert film on YouTube, which captured his October 27, 2025 performance at the Shrine Auditorium in Los Angeles.

His fifth album, Pirouette, released on November 11, 2026. It features cover artwork by Japanese artist Yoshitaka Amano. He is scheduled to embark on a tour in 2027 in North American and Europe in support of the album. Lucy Bedroque and Conceal will open for the tour.

== Artistry ==
=== Musical style ===
A rapper, singer, and producer, 2hollis has been cited by music outlets as an EDM and rap artist, with his music often described as energetic and frenetic. His live performances and the audiences at them have also been recognized for their high energy by both himself and music writers alike. His work touches on various subgenres, having been described as electropop, hyperpop, rage, industrial dance, cloud rap, and electroclash. Early in his career, 2hollis denounced the digicore labeling of his music. He views his work as a constant amalgamation of evolution, heavily influenced by things like early renaissance, religious memorabilia, and mythology.

Writing for NPR, Sheldon Pearce opined that 2hollis' music tends "to have a more orderly composition even at its most loose and eccentric. He'd probably reject hyperpop as a signifier too: If that genre's definitive signature is hyperactivity, his is a far less scatterbrained approach. On his crashing, digi-fied 2023 album 2, or in or warp-speed tunes like 'trauma' and 'gold', the guiding force is more restless energy than pure overstimulation". Eileen Cartter of GQ described 2hollis' music as "a bionic sort of electro-dance-rap that manages to sound both punishing and gossamer". Emma Madden of The Face described his music as "caustic" and "compulsive", writing that it "sounds like a mix of Crystal Castles, Drain Gang, Justin Bieber, EDM, rage and a pipe bomb".

=== Influences and production ===
Describing 2hollis' musical imagery, Revolver's John Hill wrote that "2hollis has crafted his own world of music since first releasing songs as a teenager — a world that includes self-aware and unabashed references to Minecraft, deadmau5, Berlin techno, black metal and mid-Aughts trap". 2hollis has directly cited the video game Minecraft as a considerable influence on his music, even sampling sounds from it in his production. He draws musical influence from a variety of EDM genres such as deep Detroit house and techno. He has specifically cited EDM producer Skrillex and the witch house band Salem as influences, as well as rappers Lil Uzi Vert, Playboi Carti, Bladee, and Yung Lean. On the latter two, he has stated "Everyone knows, I owe a lot to Drain Gang. Big reason I'm even doing this shit. Bladee was the first dude I saw who I was like, damn, you can be a rapper as a white boy and it's not corny".

In an interview with Rolling Stone, he stated that production "sometimes felt like the main point", with vocals coming as a second priority in his work, though that following Star, he began to focus more on vocals and songwriting. His production features a maximalist approach, often including sharp synths and booming 808s. Reviewing Boy, Brady Brickner-Wood wrote on 2hollis' vocal performance, opining that "One of Hollis' more obvious strengths as a vocalist is how powerfully he can distill visceral emotions through seemingly simple means".

=== Aesthetic and gender expression ===
2hollis has expressed an affinity for worldbuilding and lore. He often uses alternative aliases and cryptic imagery online. though he has stated that he is not "trying to be mysterious". His largely Gen Z fanbase has been noted for its tendency to engage with the lore around him through fan accounts on social media, particularly TikTok. Having a "theater kid" background, he has likened "2hollis" to a character, stating that in regards to being "mysterious" or sharing his personal life, "a character wouldn't be so forward and 100% out there and readable and relatable. Like, your favorite character from a movie—you wouldn't see Howl from Howl's Moving Castle on Instagram being like, 'Oh yeah, today I'm going to this store, what are y'all doing?' I like to keep it a little theatrical".

On his visual look, 2hollis has been noted for an "elfin" and androgynous appearance, with his pale skin and long, blonde hair particularly mentioned by music writers. Madden wrote that he "radiates elfin otherworldliness, with platinum blonde hair extensions that reach down to the top of his ribcage, a look which he had as a fantasy-loving child", while Cartter described his look as "imagine if Legolas got cast in a Rick Owens runway show". On his fashion, 2hollis has stated that he likes to wear makeup and wigs, not seeing them as "inherently feminine". He has mentioned Prince and the aforementioned Howl as influences on his personal gender expression; on the latter, he elaborated "that character perfectly encapsulates a balance of the feminine and the masculine in such a harmonious way. I remember watching that movie as a kid and just being like, 'I want to be him so badly'. I never really related to more traditional masculine figures". Speaking to Cartter, he discussed embracing both masculine and feminine qualities, stating that "gender rules are not something I really think about much or adhere to", and that for his fashion choices specifically, "I've never cared or applied gender to fashion with myself".

== Personal life ==
2hollis is in a relationship with model and artist Sirena Warren. He has stated she was a primary influence on his album Pirouette.

2hollis' relationship with religion is described as secretive, however, he has stated that he is a very spiritual person; his connection to otherworldly aspects of his art is a notable driver in his music.

== Discography ==
=== Studio albums ===
List of studio albums with selected album details
Title	Album details	Peak chart positions
Title	Album details	US Dance
White Tiger	Released: August 11, 2022; Label: Self-released; Format: Digital download, LP	—
2	Released: May 11, 2023; Label: Self-released; Format: Digital download, LP	—
Boy	Released: June 7, 2024; Label: Self-released; Format: Digital download, LP	—
Star	Released: April 4, 2025; Label: Interscope; Format: Digital download, LP	11
Pirouette	Released: November 11, 2026; Label: Interscope; Format: Digital download, LP, CD	—

=== Mixtapes ===
List of mixtapes with selected album details
Title	Album details
The Jarl	Released: December 17, 2021; Label: Self-released; Format: Digital download
Finally Lost	Released: May 5, 2022; Label: Self-released; Format: Digital download

=== EPs ===
Extended plays
Title	EP details
Game World (as Drippysoup)	Released: January 10, 2020; Label: Self-released; Format: Digital download
Tree	Released: October 14, 2020; Label: Self-released; Format: Digital download
Meta	Released: August 4, 2021; Label: OSX; Format: Digital download
As Within, So Without	Released: March 9, 2022; Label: Self-released; Format: Digital download
Lost Files	Released: May 25, 2022; Label: Self-released; Format: Digital download
Mage 1 (with Finn Sigil, as Mage Eternal)	Released: June 22, 2022; Label: Self-released; Format: Digital download
Crashsite (as Cross)	Released: April 20, 2026; Label: Self-released; Format: Digital download

=== Singles ===
Title	Year	Peak chart positions	Album
Title	Year	NZ Hot	Album
"Shedim"	2021	—	Meta
"Safety"	2022	—	White Tiger
"Actor"	2022	—	White Tiger
"Plaster"	2022	—	2
"Forfeit"	2022	—	2
"God"	2023	—	2
"Whiplash" / "Cliche"	2023	—	Non-album singles
"Jeans"	2023	—	Non-album singles
"Light"	2024	—	Boy
"Crush"	2024	—	Boy
"Trauma"	2024	—	Non-album singles
"Gold"	2024	—	Non-album singles
"Afraid" (with Nate Sib)	2025	—	Non-album singles
"Style"	2025	24	Non-album singles
"Left to Right" (with Rommulas)	2025	—	Non-album singles
"Hurt"	2026	—	Pirouette
"Sex"	2026	—	Pirouette
"Warhorse"	2026	—	Pirouette
"The Lady in Red"	2026	—	Pirouette

=== Other charted and certified songs ===
Title	Year	Peak chart positions			Certifications	Album
Title	Year	US Bub.	US R&B/HH	NZ Hot	Certifications	Album
"Poster Boy"	2023	—	—	—	RIAA: Gold	2
"ShadesOn" (with Ken Carson)	2026	15	35	—		Xperiment
"Daisy"	2026	—	—	37		Pirouette

== Tours ==
=== Headlining ===
- Leg One (2024)
- Boy EU Tour (2024)
- Leg Two (2025)
- Boy AU Tour (2025)
- Boy Asia Tour (2025)
- Euro Tour (2025)
- Star Tour (2025)
- Pirouette Tour (2027)

=== Supporting ===
- The Chaos Tour (2024) (supporting Ken Carson)
- Ultrasound World Tour (2025) (supporting Lorde)
