= Boy (2hollis album) =

Studio album by 2hollis
- Released: June 7, 2024
- Genre: EDM; electropop; electroclash
- Length: 37:29
- Label: Self-released
- Producer: 2hollis

2hollis chronology
2 (2023)	Boy (2024)	Star (2025)

Singles from Boy
- 1. "Light" Released: February 22, 2024; 2. "Crush" Released: April 26, 2024

Boy is the third studio album by the American musician 2hollis, self-released on June 7, 2024. It was promoted by two singles and his first headlining tour across Europe. The album gained 2hollis a larger Generation Z fanbase and allowed him to open for Ken Carson from July to August 2024. 2hollis wrote and produced the entirety of the album and chose the title because of its coming of age feeling. Boy is an EDM, electropop, and electroclash album with unpredictable sounds and mutating compositions. It received a positive review from Pitchfork and gained further approval from Consequence.

== Background and release ==
2hollis released his second studio album, 2, in 2023. He released the songs "Whiplash" and "Cliche" in August 2023 and was followed by "Jeans" in October; the latter was considered one of the best songs of 2024 by Jon Caramanica of The New York Times. The lead single of Boy, 2hollis' third studio album, "Light", was released on February 22, 2024. It was followed by the album's second single, "Crush", on April 26; Boy was self-released on June 7. 2hollis chose the album's name because of its coming of age feeling, stating to Complex: "I was just like, my life is as a boy, and I'm just… this is me." He created the album as a reflection of growing up; he believed that growing up comes with ups and downs, though "sometimes those downs are the most inspiring moments for [him]". Boy was entirely written and produced by 2hollis. The album gained 2hollis a larger Generation Z fanbase, and received praise from musicians such as Ken Carson and Skrillex. Boy was supported by his first headlining tour; it took place throughout June and July 2024 in Europe. From July to August 2024, he opened for the American leg of Carson's Chaos Tour.

== Composition ==
Boy is an EDM, electropop, and electroclash album with unpredictable songs and constantly transforming compositions. Multiple tracks contain sound effects from the 2011 video game Minecraft. Brady Brickner-Wood of Pitchfork described the album as "an even clubbier, gummier electropop record" than 2. Its opening track, "You Once Said My Name for the First Time", is driven by a digital organ and choral harmonies; it transitions to a two-minute-long drop consisting of droning sounds. "Two Bad" is led by synthesizers, tempo- and texture-shifting drums, as well as unrelenting singing. The following "Sister" has a percussive instrumental and side-chained synthesizers; it is an analogy about "loving your girlfriend like a sibling". An electronic and electropop track, "Crush" displays 2hollis expressing admiration for a girl, despite feeling embarrassed about sharing his feelings. When the ballad climaxes, it is met with hard-hitting kicks; vocally, 2hollis chants the song's title and produces an unhinged scream. "Say It Again" is a rave song with a lo-fi piano cutting in to its midpoint; one verse showcases 2hollis murmur the line "I want you to say it again" atop bumping bass and synthesizer plucks. "Lie" is a bit-crushed rap song that expresses pain and desire using clichés. "Promise" was described as a "bombastic piano ballad" by Brickner-Wood.

== Critical reception ==
Professional ratings
Review scores
Source	Rating
Pitchfork	7.2/10

In a positive review for Pitchfork, Brickner-Wood described 2hollis' production as "the stuff of a cooped-up prodigy whose mind can't help but move a million miles an hour". He lauded the album for establishing 2hollis as "a remarkably distinctive, eagerly experimental savant whose sound never stalls or stagnates" and cited "You Once Said My Name for the First Time" and "Lie" as highlights on the album. Though, he considered "Promise" and "Sister" weaker tracks; he commented on how spending too much time listening to 2hollis "can drain as much as it enlivens". Boy was listed as one of the best albums of June 2024 by Consequence; Paolo Ragusa highlighted "a frequent tension between EDM-aided explosions and glitched-out, sputtering sonic collapse", and called the songs on Boy "an outstanding collection". The same publication also listed "Sister" as one of the best tracks of the week of its release.

== Track listing ==
All tracks are written and produced by Hollis Frazier-Herndon (2hollis).

Boy track listing
No.	Title	Length
1.	"You Once Said My Name for the First Time"	6:00
2.	"Two Bad"	3:34
3.	"Sister"	3:35
4.	"Crush"	2:26
5.	"I Saw It Flash Before Me"	2:38
6.	"Say It"	1:20
7.	"Say It Again"	2:27
8.	"Teenage Soldier"	3:06
9.	"Lie"	2:23
10.	"Promise"	2:26
11.	"3"	2:27
12.	"Light"	2:45
13.	"Mountain"	2:22
Total length:		37:29

== Personnel ==
Credits adapted from Tidal.

- 2hollis – vocals, songwriter, producer, mixing, recording
- Mike Tucci – mastering, engineering
- Dave Virgile – product manager
