= Ken Carson discography =

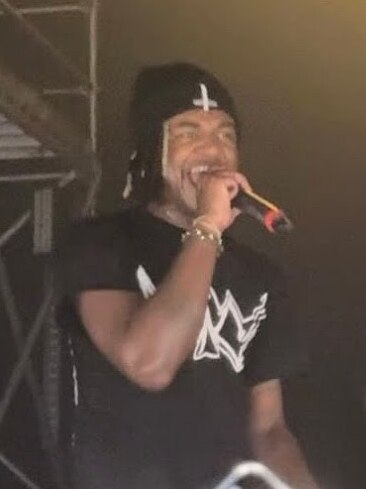
- Carson performing in 2024
- Studio albums: 5
- EPs: 5
- Mixtapes: 2
- Singles: 16
- Music videos: 21

The American rapper Ken Carson has released five studio albums, two mixtapes, five extended plays (EPs), sixteen singles (including four as a featured artist), and twenty-one music videos. Carson released his debut single "32" in 2016, followed by a series of singles that have since been taken offline. In 2019, he signed to Playboi Carti's record label Opium. The following year, he released two EPs, Boy Barbie and Teen X, the latter of which spawned his first hit single "Yale". In early 2021, Carson released the Teen X: Relapsed and Lost Files EPs before releasing his debut album, Project X, in July that year. His second album and major label debut, X, was released though Opium and Interscope Records in 2022. The album became his first to chart on both the US Billboard 200 and Top Hip-Hop Albums charts, peaking at numbers 115 and 50 respectively, whilst the album track "Freestyle 2" became one of his most popular songs.

In October 2023, Carson released his third album A Great Chaos. Considered his breakout album, it debuted at number 11 on the Billboard 200, becoming his first top 20 album in the United States, and was certified Platinum by the Recording Industry Association of America (RIAA); it also performed well in Canada and Europe. The album's deluxe edition, released in July 2024, spawned the single "Overseas", which became Carson's first charting song on the US Billboard Hot 100, at number 79. Carson's fourth album More Chaos (2025) was his first to debut atop the Billboard 200 and the Top Hip-Hop Albums charts. His fifth album, Xperiment (2026), debuted at number 7 on the Billboard 200, while its deluxe re-issue, Cartunez, debuted at number 52.

== Studio albums ==
List of studio albums, with selected chart positions, sales figures and certifications
Title	Album details	Peak chart positions										Sales	Certifications
Title	Album details	US	US R&B /HH	AUS	CAN	FIN	GER	LTU	NLD	NZ	UK	Sales	Certifications
Project X	Released: July 23, 2021; Label: Opium; Format: Digital download, streaming	— (Note: Project X did not enter the Billboard 200 chart, but peaked at number 18 on the Billboard Heatseekers Albums Chart.)	—	—	—	—	—	—	—	—	—		
X	Released: July 8, 2022; Label: Opium, Interscope; Format: LP, digital download, streaming	115	50	—	—	—	—	—	—	—	—		
A Great Chaos	Released: October 13, 2023; Label: Opium, Interscope; Format: LP, CD, digital download, streaming	11	4	— (Note: A Great Chaos did not enter the ARIA Albums Chart, but peaked at number 4 on the ARIA Hitseekers Albums Chart.)	18	35	45	9	51	21	43	US: 828,000 (Note: United States album-equivalent unit sales for A Great Chaos as of April 2025); WW: 1,300,000 (Note: Worldwide album-equivalent unit sales for A Great Chaos as of April 2025)	RIAA: Platinum; BPI: Silver; MC: Platinum; RMNZ: Gold; ZPAV: Gold
More Chaos	Released: April 11, 2025; Label: Opium, Interscope; Format: LP, CD, digital download, streaming	1	1	—	17	—	45	37	65	26	54		
Xperiment	Released: July 3, 2026; Label: Opium, Interscope; Format: LP, CD, digital download, streaming	7	2	29	21	—	47	38	45	24	62		
"—" denotes a recording that did not chart or was not released in that territory.

== Mixtapes ==
List of mixtapes
Title	Mixtape details
Lost Files 3	Released: January 29, 2022; Label: Self-released; Format: Digital download, streaming
Lost Files 4	Released: January 3, 2023; Label: Self-released; Format: Digital download, streaming
00Twinz (with Destroy Lonely)	Scheduled: TBA; Label: Opium, Interscope

== Extended plays ==
List of extended plays
Title	Extended plays details
Boy Barbie	Released: May 12, 2020; Label: Self-released; Format: Digital download, streaming
Teen X	Released: August 14, 2020; Label: Self-released; Format: Digital download, streaming
Teen X: Relapsed	Released: January 2, 2021; Label: Self-released; Format: Digital download, streaming
Lost Files	Released: January 20, 2021; Label: Self-released; Format: Digital download, streaming
Lost Files 2	Released: July 10, 2021; Label: Self-released; Format: Digital download, streaming

== Singles ==
=== As lead artist ===
List of singles as lead artist, showing year released and album name
Title	Year	Peak chart positions				Certifications	Album
Title	Year	US	US R&B/HH	CAN	NZ Hot	Certifications	Album
"32" (Note: Track is considered lost)	2016	—	—	—	—		Non-album singles
"Fold"	2018	—	—	—	—		Non-album singles
"Patrick Ewing" (with Lil Tecca)	2021	—	—	—	—		Non-album singles
"Teen Bean"	2022	—	—	—	—		Non-album singles
"The End"	2022	—	—	—	—		X
"I Need U"	2023	—	—	—	—	RIAA: Gold	A Great Chaos
"Overseas"	2024	79	34	93	13	RIAA: Platinum	A Great Chaos (Deluxe)
"Delusional"	2024	— (Note: "Delusional" did not enter the Billboard Hot 100, but peaked at number 8 on the Bubbling Under Hot 100 chart.)	49	—	17		Non-album singles
"Yes"	2025	—	39	—	24		Non-album singles
"Catastrophe"	2025	—	—	—	32		Non-album singles
"Margiela"	2025	—	—	—	—		Non-album singles
"The Acronym" (with Destroy Lonely)	2025	— (Note: "The Acronym" did not enter the Billboard Hot 100, but peaked at number 6 on the Bubbling Under Hot 100 chart.)	23	—	15		Non-album singles
"—" denotes a recording that did not chart or was not released in that territory.

=== As featured artist ===
List of singles as featured artist, showing year released and album name
Title	Year	Album
"Hell Yeah" (SoFaygo featuring Ken Carson)	2022	Pink Heartz
"She Want Some More" (Internet Money featuring Lil Tecca and Ken Carson)	2022	Non-album singles
"Natural Habitat" (070 Shake featuring Ken Carson)	2023	Non-album singles
"President" (Southside and Destroy Lonely featuring Ken Carson)	2024	Non-album singles

== Other charted and certified songs ==
List of other charted and certified songs, with showing year released and album name
Title	Year	Peak chart positions			Certifications	Album
Title	Year	US Bub.	US R&B/HH	NZ Hot	Certifications	Album
"Yale"	2020	—	—	—	BPI: Silver; RIAA: Gold	Teen X
"Rock n Roll"	2021	—	—	—	RIAA: Platinum	Project X
"Freestyle 2"	2022	—	—	—	RIAA: Platinum	X
"Fell in Love" (with Lil Tecca)	2023	18	—	25		Tec
"Green Room"	2023	17	—	—	RIAA: Gold	A Great Chaos
"Jennifer's Body"	2023	4	43	19	RIAA: Gold	A Great Chaos
"Fighting My Demons"	2023	2	40	14	RIAA: Platinum	A Great Chaos
"Singapore" (featuring Destroy Lonely)	2023	9	—	31		A Great Chaos
"Lose It"	2023	21	—	—		A Great Chaos
"Me n My Kup"	2023	19	—	—	RIAA: Gold	A Great Chaos
"Succubus"	2023	18	—	—	RIAA: Gold	A Great Chaos
"Paranoid" (featuring Destroy Lonely)	2023	15	—	29	RIAA: Gold	A Great Chaos
"Loading"	2024	—	—	38		A Great Chaos (Deluxe)
"Mewtwo"	2024	24	32	24	RIAA: Gold	A Great Chaos (Deluxe)
"SS"	2024	3	27	16	RIAA: Platinum	A Great Chaos (Deluxe)
"Lord of Chaos"	2025	17	30	18		More Chaos
"Xposed"	2025	—	40	—		More Chaos
"Money Spread"	2025	—	50	—		More Chaos
"Trap Jump"	2025	18	31	—		More Chaos
"Blakk Rokkstar"	2025	6	24	10		More Chaos
"LiveLeak"	2025	15	29	20		More Chaos
"Thx"	2025	—	46	—		More Chaos
"Off the Meter" (with Playboi Carti and Destroy Lonely)	2025	11	26	13		More Chaos
"WhereDoIStart"	2026	—	43	20		Xperiment
"Deaf Note" (with Playboi Carti)	2026	3	30	18		Xperiment
"ShadesOn" (with 2hollis)	2026	15	35	12		Xperiment
"Gynecologist"	2026	9	33	17		Xperiment
"Ghost" (with Lil Uzi Vert)	2026	18	39	—		Xperiment
"—" denotes a recording that did not chart or was not released in that territory.

== Guest appearances ==
List of appearances on other songs, showing year released and album name
Title	Year	Other artist(s)	Album
"Geek High"	2022	Yeat	2 Alive
"Veteran"	2022	Destroy Lonely	No Stylist
"Hell Yeah"	2022	SoFaygo	Pink Heartz
"Stunt"	2022	Homixide Gang	Homixide Lifestyle
"Money & Sex"	2023	Destroy Lonely	If Looks Could Kill
"Fell In Love"	2023	Lil Tecca	Tec
"Thrill"	2024	Destroy Lonely	Love Lasts Forever
"Tic Tac Toe"	2025	Lil Tecca	Dopamine
"PB&J"	2025	Homixide Gang	Homixide Lifestyle 2
"Open It Up"	2025	Destroy Lonely	ᐸ/3³
"Yuck"	2025	Young Thug	UY Scuti
"004*005"	2026	Bally Baby	The Last Sipper

== Music videos ==
List of music videos, showing year released and director
Title	Year	Director(s)
"Gold Medal"	2020	Unknown
"Yale"	2020	Unknown
"High as Sh!T"	2021	Unknown
"Butterfly"	2021	Damien Wayne
"Rock N Roll"	2021	Oliver Shore, Kevin Von Puttkammer
"Change"	2021	Unknown
"Run + Ran"	2021	Oliver Shore
"The End"	2022	Oliver Shore, Kevin Von Puttkammer
"Go"	2022	Oliver Shore, Kevin Von Puttkammer
"MDMA"	2022	Oliver Shore, Kevin Von Puttkammer
"Freestyle 2"	2023	Oliver Shore, Kevin Von Puttkammer
"Jennifer's Body"	2023	Oliver Shore, Kevin Von Puttkammer, Nick Spiders
"Fighting My Demons"	2023	Cole Bennett
"Succubus"	2024	HIDJIWORLD
"Overseas"	2024	Gunner Stahl
"Delusional"	2024	Gunner Stahl
"Money Spread"	2025	Actualhate
"Lord of Chaos"	2025	Nick Spiders
"Catastrophe"	2025	Gunner Stahl
"Margiela"	2025	Directedbyfrankie, Yungtacc
"Wedidit"	2026	Directedbyfrankie

== Production credits ==
List of song production credits, showing year released and album name
Title	Year	Artist(s)	Album
"Beno!"	2020	Playboi Carti	Whole Lotta Red
"She Want Some More"	2022	Internet Money, Lil Tecca and Ken Carson	We All We Got
"x2"	2023	Lil Uzi Vert	Pink Tape
