= Mewtwo (song) =

2024 song by Ken Carson

Song by Ken Carson

from the album A Great Chaos (Deluxe)
- Released: July 5, 2024
- Genre: Rage
- Length: 2:08
- Label: Opium; Interscope
- Songwriters: Kenyatta Frazier Jr.; Clif Shayne
- Producer: Clif Shayne

Music video
- "Mewtwo" on YouTube

"Mewtwo" is a song by American rapper Ken Carson. It was released on July 5, 2024, from the deluxe edition of his third studio album, A Great Chaos. It features music production from Clif Shayne. The name of the track comes from the legendary Pokémon Mewtwo.

== Composition and lyricism ==
=== Composition ===
"Mewtwo" is a two-minute and eight-second song. Carson co-wrote the song with Clif Shayne who handled the music production. Additionally, Ben Lidsky, Corey Moon, and Colin Leonard handled the engineering, with Leonard handling the mastering and Lidsky handling the mixing. Sonically, the track consists of "quirky lead melodies", and "delicate bell chimes" which sounds like as if was almost lifted from a Pokémon game.

=== Lyricism ===
Across the track, Carson flexes his wealth and playfully raps about money, "flexing for playful bars about the Cocoa Puffs mascot," and comparing his girl's body to that of Mewtwo.

== Reception ==
In a list done by Complex, Antonio Johri had "Mewtwo" ranked as the twelfth best song in "Ken Carson's Top 20 Songs" list, writing how it sticks out like a "sore thumb" on the deluxe track list; he praises the track's instrumental and called the track whimsical and lighthearted. Upon release, "Mewtwo" debuted at number 24 on Billboard's Bubbling Under Hot 100 chart and number 32 on the Hot R&B/Hip-Hop Songs chart, as well as number 24 on the New Zealand Hot Singles chart. On July 22, 2026, "Mewtwo" was certified gold by the RIAA.

== Cover versions ==
"Mewtwo" was also used as a sample on Brent Faiyaz and A$ap Rocky's song "Stay Here 4 Life."

== Personnel ==
Credits and personnel adapted from Apple Music.

Musicians

- Kenyatta Frazier Jr. – vocals
- Clif Shayne - production

Technical

- Colin Leonard – mastering
- Ben Lidsky – mixing
- Corey Moon – recording

== Charts ==
Chart performance for "ShadesOn"
Chart (2026)	Peak position
New Zealand Hot Singles (RMNZ)	24
US Bubbling Under Hot 100 (Billboard)	24
US Hot R&B/Hip-Hop Songs (Billboard)	32

== Certifications ==
Certifications for Mewtwo
Region	Certification	Certified units/sales
United States (RIAA)	Gold	500,000^{‡}
^{‡} Sales+streaming figures based on certification alone.
