= Jennifer's Body =

2009 film by Karyn Kusama

- Theatrical release poster
- Directed by: Karyn Kusama
- Written by: Diablo Cody
- Produced by: Daniel Dubiecki; Mason Novick; Jason Reitman
- Starring: Megan Fox; Amanda Seyfried; Johnny Simmons; J. K. Simmons; Amy Sedaris; Adam Brody
- Cinematography: M. David Mullen
- Edited by: Plummy Tucker
- Music by: Stephen Barton; Theodore Shapiro
- Production companies: Fox Atomic; Dune Entertainment
- Distributed by: 20th Century Fox
- Release dates: September 10, 2009 (TIFF); September 18, 2009 (United States)
- Running time: 102 minutes
- Country: United States
- Language: English
- Budget: $16 million
- Box office: $31.6 million

Jennifer's Body is a 2009 American comedy horror film directed by Karyn Kusama and written by Diablo Cody. It stars Megan Fox, Amanda Seyfried, Johnny Simmons, J. K. Simmons, Amy Sedaris, and Adam Brody. The film follows Jennifer Check (Fox), a demonically possessed high school student, who kills her male classmates and devours their flesh in order to survive, while her bookworm best friend Anita "Needy" Lesnicki (Seyfried) must find a way to end her killing spree.

Jason Reitman, who has worked with Cody before on Juno (2007), stated he and his producers "want to make unusual films". Cody said she wanted the film to speak to female empowerment and explore the complex relationships between best friends. As a tie-in to the film, Boom! Studios produced a Jennifer's Body graphic novel, released in August 2009.

Jennifer's Body premiered at the Toronto International Film Festival on September 10, 2009, and was released in theaters in the United States and Canada on September 18, 2009. The film was a commercial failure, grossing $31.6 million against its $16 million production budget. It received mixed reviews from critics: loving the dialogue, the emotional resonance, and the performances by the cast, while critiquing the tone and narrative of the film.

In the years since Jennifer's Body's release, there were revelations that the film's poor marketing campaign was the result of the studio's desire to capitalize on Fox's sex appeal and gear the film towards a younger male audience. Since then, the film has undergone a critical re-evaluation and has been described as a feminist cult classic.

== Plot ==
Anita "Needy" Lesnicki, once an insecure and studious teenager living in the small town of Devil's Kettle, Minnesota, has become a violent asylum inmate who narrates the story as a flashback while in solitary confinement.

Since childhood, Needy has been best friends with Jennifer Check, a popular and beautiful high school color guard flag spinner, despite the two having little in common. Jennifer often mistreats and dominates Needy, who is too in awe of her to stand up for herself. One night, Jennifer takes Needy to a local dive bar to attend a concert by the indie rock band Low Shoulder. A fire engulfs the bar, killing several people. Jennifer, in shock from the fire, leaves with the band even though Needy tells her not to. Later that evening, she appears in Needy's kitchen, covered in blood, and attempts to eat a rotisserie chicken. She immediately vomits a trail of black fluid and almost bites Needy's neck but retreats and leaves.

The next morning at school, Jennifer appears fine and dismisses Needy's concerns, appearing apathetic to the fire tragedy. She seduces Jonas, the school's football captain and lures him into the woods, where she disembowels and cannibalizes him. Meanwhile, Low Shoulder gains popularity due to their falsely rumored heroism during the fire and earns a cult following status.

A month later, Jennifer becomes ill and listless. She accepts a date with school alternative/emo Colin, whom she invites to an abandoned house; once there, she brutally kills and devours him. While Needy and her boyfriend Chip have sex, Needy senses something dreadful has happened and has a disturbing vision of a demonic Jennifer. She flees back home, but on the way, she runs into a blood-soaked Jennifer on the road. After returning home unhurt, Needy finds a revitalized and amorous Jennifer in her bed. Jennifer attempts to seduce Needy by kissing her; Needy initially reciprocates but then comes to her senses.

Jennifer reveals that Low Shoulder had taken her into the woods after the bar fire and offered her as a virgin ultimate sacrifice to Satan in exchange for fame and fortune. Although the sacrifice was a success, Jennifer was not actually a virgin, so she became permanently possessed. She became hungry, and Ahmet, a foreign exchange student who was thought to have died in the fire, was her first victim. She had intended to eat Needy first but left because she could not bring herself to hurt her best friend. Whenever she eats a victim, she can withstand any injury without pain and heal instantly.

Needy goes to the school library's occult section and determines that Jennifer is a succubus who must feed on flesh and can only be killed while she is hungry and weak. Needy tells Chip about Jennifer. He refuses to believe her, so she breaks up with him in order to protect him. Jennifer intercepts Chip on the way to the school dance and claims that Needy had been cheating on him with Colin. She tries to seduce him, but he is not interested. She takes him to an abandoned pool and begins feeding on him. Needy arrives, and as the two girls argue, Chip impales Jennifer through the stomach with a pool skimmer. However, Jennifer, having eaten enough to survive the injury, removes the pool skimmer and escapes while Chip dies.

Angry and heartbroken, Needy breaks into Jennifer's bedroom. The two fight, and Jennifer bites Needy's shoulder in the struggle. When Needy rips Jennifer's best friend necklace off her neck, Jennifer stops fighting back. Needy then stabs her in the heart with a utility knife, killing her and destroying the demon. Jennifer's mother enters and finds Needy on top of her daughter's body, resulting in Needy's imprisonment. After manifesting some of Jennifer's supernatural powers from the bite, Needy eventually escapes the mental facility, tracks down Low Shoulder, and murders them.

== Cast ==
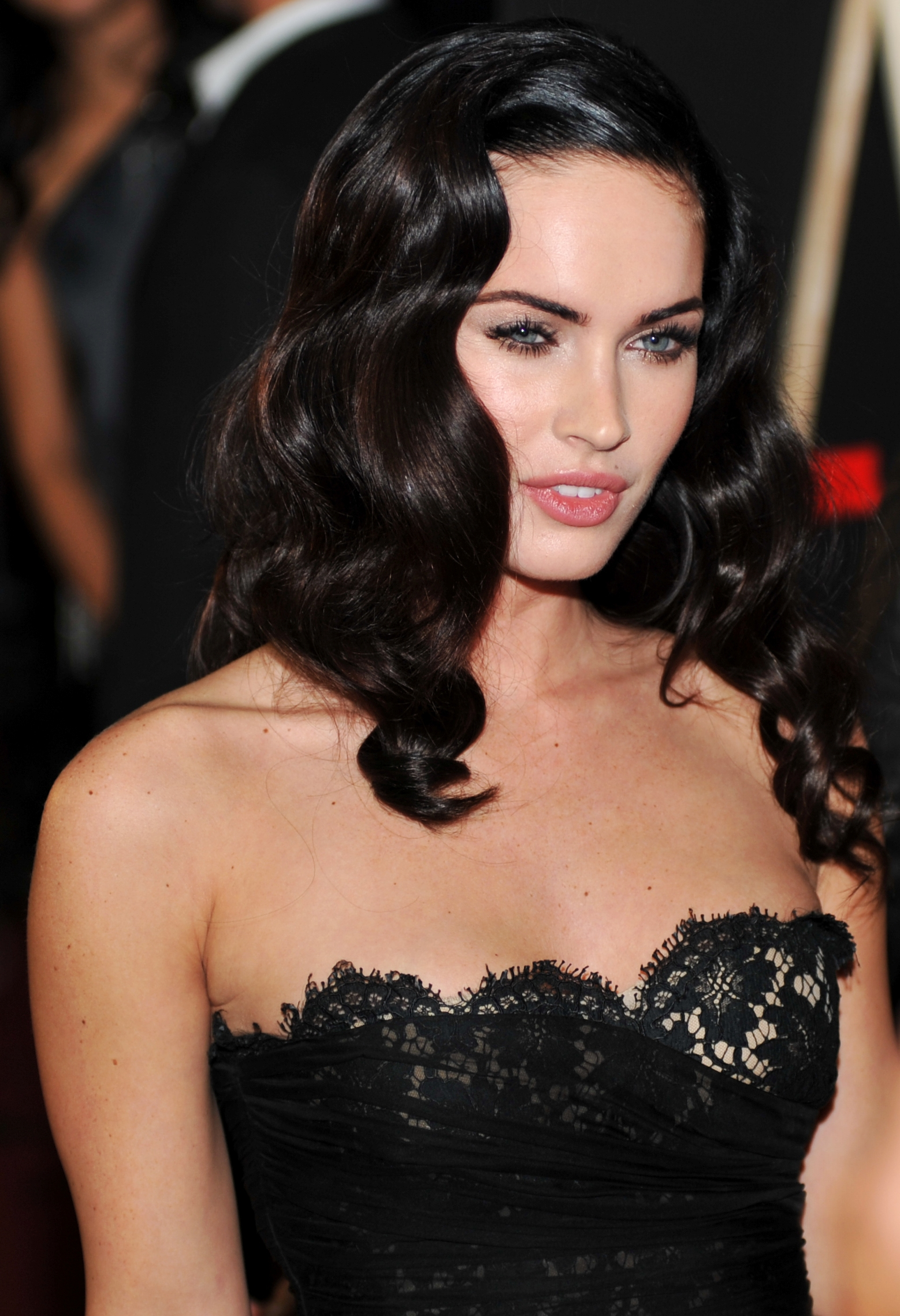
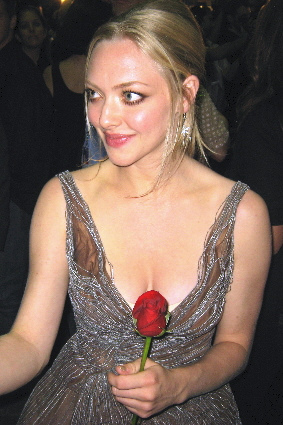
Megan Fox and Amanda Seyfried play Jennifer and Needy, respectively.
- Megan Fox as Jennifer Check
- Amanda Seyfried as Anita "Needy" Lesnicki
- Adam Brody as Nikolai Wolf
- Johnny Simmons as Chip Dove
- J. K. Simmons as Mr. Wroblewski
- Amy Sedaris as Toni Lesnicki
- Kyle Gallner as Colin Gray
- Cynthia Stevenson as Mrs. Dove
- Chris Pratt as Officer Roman Duda
- Carrie Genzel as Mrs. Check
- Juan Riedinger as Dirk
- Juno Ruddell as Officer Warzak
- Valerie Tian as Chastity
- Aman Johal as Ahmet
- Josh Emerson as Jonas Kozelle
- Bill Fagerbakke as Jonas' dad
- Lance Henriksen as the driver near the end of film
- Michael Brock as Goth Boy
- Eve Harlow as Goth Girl #1
- Genevieve Buechner as Goth Girl #2

== Production ==
=== Development ===
Jennifer's Body is the follow-up to writer and producer Diablo Cody and Jason Reitman's collaboration efforts on Juno. In October 2007, Fox Atomic pre-emptively purchased the rights to Cody's script with Megan Fox to star. Peter Rice, who at the time oversaw Fox Searchlight and Fox Atomic, brought in the project as Fox Searchlight had previously distributed Cody's film Juno. Mason Novick and Reitman's producing partner Dan Dubiecki signed as producers in November 2007 with plans to produce the film under Hard C, which is housed at Fox Searchlight. Reitman commented, "We want to make unusual films, and anything that turns a genre on its ear interests Dan and I." Karyn Kusama took over as director in January 2008. Kusama said she signed on to the project because of the script. "I was blessed to read this script at a moment where the producers were meeting with directors and it just knocked me out. It was just so original, so imaginative", she stated. "That's what it is about this script and the world is that it feels like a fairy tale gone psycho and I think that's what most fairy tales actually started as." Additionally, Cody, Reitman and Kusama knew the film would be R rated because of the language.

I remember cracking open my father's laser disk of Nightmare on Elm Street and having the coolest movie moments of my childhood and I can't imagine having that experience with any other genre. I can't imagine dangerously opening a broad comedy in the middle of the night hoping I wouldn't get caught. I have an idea there's a kid out there who will be secretly opening up a Blu-ray of Jennifer's Body and I think it's pretty exciting to all of us.

— Jason Reitman

In February 2008, a cease and desist was given to a writer at CC2K.us after they posted an advance script review for the film. The Latino Review also posted an advance review. At the time CC2K.us received their cease and desist order, questions were raised why Latino Review's largely positive script review was allowed to stay posted while CC2K was being forced by Fox Searchlight to remove their mainly negative coverage. Although Latino Review was later asked to remove their review, numerous other websites and blogs published their own critiques of the script.

Cody stated that when writing the script, she was "simultaneously trying to pay tribute to some of the conventions that we've already seen in horror, yet, at the same time, kind of turn them on their ear". One of her influences from the 1980s horror genre was the film The Lost Boys. She wanted to "honor that, and at the same time, [she] had never really seen this particular subgenre done with girls and [she] tried to do a little of both". Despite this, she said she had noticed that "the last survivor standing in the typical horror film is a woman" and that because of this she feels "horror has always had kind of a feminist angle to it in a weird way and, at the same time, it's kind of delightfully exploitative". Jennifer's Body could play on both of these aspects. In terms of other influences, the film has been frequently compared to the 2001 film Ginger Snaps, though neither Diablo Cody nor Karyn Kusama have acknowledged it as an influence.

Cody said she wanted the film to speak to female empowerment and explore the complex relationships between best friends. "(Director) Karyn Kusama and I are both outspoken feminists", she said. "We wanted to subvert the classic horror model of women being terrorized. I want to write roles that service women. I want to tell stories from a female perspective. I want to create good parts for actresses where they're not just accessories to men." Addressing "the male-dominated" horror genre, Cody said "a key reason for writing the film was to bring to the screen a new way of expressing the intensity of female bonds" and that the adolescent female friendships she experienced were unparalleled in their intensity. She wanted to show the "almost horrific" aspect of such devotion and its relation to parasitism.

The producers decided to have the film open with the statement "Hell is a teenage girl" to reflect the "horrors" of puberty and that "the hellish emotions felt during high school often reappear as teenage girls mature into young women". Cody stated:

There's the scene where Jennifer's sitting alone smearing makeup on her face. I always thought that was such a sad image. She's so vulnerable. I don't know any woman who hasn't had a moment sitting in front of the mirror and thinking, 'Help me, I want to be somebody else.' What makes it extra affecting is that [Megan Fox] is stunning.

Cody crafted the story to follow a night that ends in a tragic fire, after which Jennifer is abducted and set up as a sacrifice which goes awry. Jennifer, now possessed by a demon and subsequently altered into a succubus, sets out on a bloody rampage in which she devours boys, and it is up to Needy to stop her. In sort of a reversal aspect of how puberty changes a girl's life, Jennifer must consume the blood of others once a month or she becomes weak and plain-looking. "It's a meek shall inherit the Earth sort of thing. I think it's always really satisfying and cathartic to see a character that was previously bullied become super human", said Cody. Cody said the script is not a reflection of any part of her own life, but that she is more like the character Needy. "I would say I was more of a Needy than a Jennifer. I was never an Alpha female, and I've never gotten off with bullying other people", she said. "If I had to choose, I was definitely the one being shoved, not the one shoving."

The nickname "Needy" was given to Seyfried's character to underline the essentially condescending dynamic in Jennifer and Needy's high school relationship, as Needy often admires Jennifer and feels she needs her. Cody said "Jennifer is a product of a culture that pressures girls to be skinny, beautiful and just like movie stars" and that she "hopes the film inspires girls to take life into their own hands and do with it, what they want". "If I had gone to this movie as a teenage girl, I would've come out of it feeling totally inspired", she stated. "I would've wanted to write, I would've wanted to create and I would've felt like I watched something that was speaking to me."

Assigned to direct the film, Kusama said, "I think also a lot of horror is about femaleness — whether it's Carrie or Rosemary's Baby." She said she feels "like there's a lot of fear of the female or kind of celebration of it in some weird way and something about this movie managed to take the fear and the sense that it's the female that ultimately survives and sort of marry that in a really interesting way".

Addressing her decision to have Jennifer and Needy be romantically intimate at one point during the film, which takes place in the form of a long and passionate kissing scene, Cody said she did not write the scene to score publicity. Speaking of the scene's media hype, she said that "if the two protagonists of the film were a guy and a girl and in a particularly tense moment, they shared a kiss, no one would say it was gratuitous" but "the fact that they're women means it's some kind of stunt". The scene was "intended to be something profound and meaningful" to her and Kusama. She further stated:

Obviously we knew people were going to totally sensationalize it. They're beautiful girls, the scene is hot—I'm not afraid to say that. There is a sexual energy between the girls which is kind of authentic, because I know when I was a teen-aged girl, the friendships that I had with other girls were almost romantic, they were so intense. I wanted to sleep at my friend's house every night, I wanted to wear her clothes, we would talk on the phone until our ears ached. I wanted to capture that heightened feeling you get as an adolescent that you don't really feel as a grownup. (laughs) You like [your] friends when you're a grownup, but you don't need to sleep in the same bed with them and talk to them on the phone until 5 a.m. every night.

Though the film is part comedy, Cody initially intended for it to be a "very dark, very brooding" traditional slasher film. Close to "a third of the way into the process" she felt that she was incapable of doing so because "the humor just kept sneaking in". She stated, "I have a macabre sense of humor. A lot of the things in the movie that are horrifying are funny to me." Feeling that "comedy films and horror films are kind of similar" due to being films where you can significantly gauge intense audience reactions, Cody stated, "They're laughing, they're screaming, it's not a passive experience. So, I actually think comedy and horror are kind of similar in that way."

=== Casting ===
Megan Fox was in negotiations to star as Jennifer Check since 2007, and was officially cast in October 2007. Fox said the reason she agreed to the role was her love for the script. "I think what I loved about the movie is it's so unapologetic and how completely inappropriate it is at all times," she said. "That was my favorite part about the script and about the character. It's fun to be able to say the shit that she got to say and get away with it and how people find it charming." Asked how acting in a film like this is different from acting in Transformers, Fox said "there's [no] distractions, like there's no robots to distract you from whatever performance I do give. So, if it's terrible, you're gonna fucking know that it's really terrible". She said despite this aspect of the business being intimidating, she enjoyed portraying the character. "I wasn't really sure what I was doing," said Fox. "I was just trying to have fun with it and I felt like I was able to make fun of my own image as to how some people might perceive Megan Fox to be. I was just sort of flying freely and I hope some of it works." In balancing out the film's horror with humor, she said she relied heavily on Diablo Cody's script and Karyn Kusama's direction to pull it off, stating, "I have a very specific sense of humor, things that I think are funny aren't going to fly with middle America. It's going to eliminate some of the audience, so you need someone there to tell you you can't do that."

In February 2008, Amanda Seyfried was cast as Anita "Needy" Lesnicki, the "plain Jane" best friend to Fox's character for whom she harbors a somewhat homoerotic infatuation. Seyfried said it was a relief to play the nerdy role opposite Fox. "Being a lead (like Megan), you have that weird pressure of feeling like you have to look attractive," she said. "In this movie, I didn't worry about any of that shit. I don't want to play the one that everybody is supposed to want to have sex with."

The filmmakers had hoped to cast an actual rock musician to portray Nikolai Wolf, with Pete Wentz of Fall Out Boy and Joel Madden of Good Charlotte being their top choices. One Tree Hill star Chad Michael Murray was also considered for the role. In March 2008, Johnny Simmons was reportedly cast as Nikolai. However, Adam Brody was officially cast in the role, while Simmons then accepted the role of Chip Dove. Brody did not perform his own vocals, saying, "My singing voice is still going through puberty. They gave me a singing lesson or two, and it's not the worst thing in the world, but it's not anything anyone would choose to hear." His vocals were provided by Ryan Levine, who also played another member of the band.

=== Design and visual effects ===
One of the makeup designs in the film for Jennifer's mouth while the character is in demonic form. Fox explained that the jaw unhinges sort of like a snake's so that Jennifer can "fully envelop" her victims. Unlike a snake, the character has long, sharp teeth in order to tear the flesh from her victims' bodies as she eats them.

Handling the film's visual effects were KNB EFX GROUP and Moving Picture Company (MPC). For Jennifer's demonic form, the creators used different techniques. "I actually wasn't in [the makeup chair] that much because they created an entire head. They did a live cast of me from the shoulders up. They created me and then put the teeth in", stated Fox. "To save my face, they had a photo double that would come in and do most of the crazy monster makeup - they would do that on her. So it would go from me, then in post-production it would somehow go to her and the fake head. They would mix them all together."

For the "vomit scene" where Jennifer has just arrived at Needy's house after being murdered and inhabited by a demon, Fox said the liquid she was given to spit out "was actually ... chocolate syrup initially". "We did a few takes where I would just do this scream and sort of puke Hershey's chocolate syrup. Scratch the Hershey's because I don't want to endorse that or anything", she stated. "And then, special effects did a rig that clamps onto my ear and you revisit it in the pool scene ..." Fox said it "clips on. It goes around the back of my ear and then I bite down on it on the side of my face, like this, and it projectiles. It's a tube ..."

Director Kusama said it had a classic feel. Fox agreed, "Yeah, and it projects whatever that material was. I'm not sure. It was pretty intense. I think it was worse for [Seyfried] because she's the one that got puked on. I was the one doing the puking."

For more practical special effects on the set as opposed to CGI, Kusama said it "was a choice that we all sort of made organically". She said they appreciate "those kind of effects in older movies and [questions] sometimes how much more effective it is to use a ton of CGI" and that they "always started with a practical effect and then moved forward from there to lay a groundwork of something that's actually physically, materially there". They found this to be more enjoyable.

Before we started shooting, it involved the full appliance attached to [Fox's] face and then her real jaw would be greened essentially inside of her mouth and then the appliance would drop below her real jaw and then visual effects essentially owned everything in her mouth and everything outside would've been a special effects appliance. And then there would've been a lot of clean up as well because of the way it attached to her face.

— Erik Nordby on the construction of Jennifer's demonic mouth and jaw

Erik Nordby of KNB (known for his work on The Haunting in Connecticut, which also features co-star Kyle Gallner) stated, "We immediately went into pitch mode in January and spent a solid two weeks trying to not only bid the script but also collect as much reference material and stuff for the first client get together." He said the director and producers wanted an "old-school, hands-off, lo-fi approach to the visual effects" so that the horror elements would not overpower the storyline. Based on the script, MPC similarly came to the same conclusion and "provided a clear direction" for Nordby and his team. "At that point when we met with them, they had already met with KNB, who had already done up a stylized still of what, at the time, they were calling 'Evil Jennifer,'" he said. "There was a lot of info yet to come, but based on the script, Jennifer goes from very beautiful Megan Fox to a very ghoulish, succubus creature whose jaw distends half-way down her face." Nordby said the look was eventually toned down at the wishes of MPC. From there, KNB "produced some tests, grabbing a bunch of stills from [Fox] and [did their] work to indicate how that balance could exist between visual effects and special effects and still maintain a level of subtlety" and that "[MPC] responded really well".

The teams wanted to "maintain some sort of the Megan Fox allure" but said that it was "incredibly difficult because as soon as [they] warped her face in any direction, the shine kind of came off it". To combat this, they ended up focusing on anything below her nose, where they had the freedom to make things "as horrific as [they] needed to" and then above her nose, "[they] could manipulate it somewhat with warps and color correction in her eye sockets. So even at her worst, she had some of that sexiness throughout".

Nordby said most of the attention was devoted to Jennifer's face and that "very quickly in combination" with special effects and makeup, MPC thought up a five-station system for what Jennifer goes through. Nordby stated:

Stage one is beautiful Jennifer and then two and three were strictly makeup where her eyes become more recessed and she would start to look plain like the rest of us. And stage four was some custom dentures that KNB made for her, and then visual effects in stage four was mainly facial warping and recessing her eyes some more and having a pinning effect to her irises and a variety of other musculature deforms, just bringing her cheek bones down more. And stage five was the full on, as crazy as it gets, which you don't really see until near the end.

During testing, Nordby and the special effects teams realized that getting Fox in and out of the appliance used to create Jennifer's murderous jaw would be too time-consuming. To remedy this, they hired a photo double. "[E]very day (for about 10 days) she would sit in a chair with this full appliance on her and we would shoot this jaw, and then all [Fox] would have to do is the dentures", stated Nordby. He said that "when it came time to shoot any of these jaw moments, [Fox] would act out in rehearsal how she was going to attack her victim and [they would] fine tune that blocking so it was relatively locked". The camera accompanied them in the same way, as "it would roll and she would put her dentures in, and they would really distort her face" in a way that would produce a satisfying and nice side effect. Additionally, the team would have Fox wear contact lenses and go through exactly the same motions as normal Jennifer. "But then I would shoot all the key poses that existed in whatever moves the digital double was doing, so that we had as much of that appliance in that lighting condition that we could get", said Nordby. "KNB also created a hairless but high detailed head of the stage five Jennifer that had an articulating jaw."

Seyfried (left) as Needy during the fire which leads to Jennifer's kidnapping, and Fox (right) as demonic Jennifer a month after the incident; the visual effects teams recessed the character's eyes and added a pinning effect to her irises, along with a variety of other musculature deforms to create the illusion.

Nordby spent a significant amount of time shooting "the articulating jaw" scene because they had "ultimate control over how the light was hitting the head". He said, "This so-called jaw shot became a pivotal point, because for four months of the post, the filmmakers thought the film was getting too scary so MPC pulled back on the jaw and then they thought it wasn't scary enough." Because of this, "they pushed back and this jaw went back and forth quite a bit to help navigate where they wanted the tone on any given day". These different poses helped the two teams perfect the jaw scenes. "From a marketing point of view, from all the test screenings they did", said Nordby, "there was a lot of work figuring out how to make this a scary film as well as a funny film." Since the team was on a small budget, they "relied more on skilled artists to think through shots rather than a brute force approach".

MPC additionally worked on the disappearing waterfall that serves as Jennifer's grave when she is killed at the beginning of the film. They transformed the mysterious waterfall into a whirlpool. "We came up with an approach that we thought would work because we had a lot of confidence in our water sims", stated Nordby. "The waterfall appears both as a day and night shot, so we had to integrate with the water. And the night shots play a pivotal role in the film, and we do a huge crane over." They could not lock it to a pan or to a tilt and filming the shots was difficult due to the actual base of the waterfall being out of reach. Nordby said, "I eventually lowered down a shot—a ton of reference of the area because I knew we'd have to do some digi-matte work to recreate the basin that the whirlpool ends up in." They soon realized that there was an insufficient amount of churning and foam to read as real as the location. The CG Supervisor, Pete Dionne, presented a different idea. "He grabbed chunks of that river and tialing it so that it had a nice stretch of birds' eye point of view of the water that existed on the location in the lighting situation we were trying to match", stated Nordby. "And then he projected that onto a whirlpool of animated sprites and had similar enough texture to the actual water that existed there, but pulled control into lighting it and could add depth mainly to the center of it." Dealing with "very shallow" water, the team had to take extra care when filming the scenes.

During the film's fire scene, Cody appears as a character in the barroom. "To me, I am afraid of fire and fire technics and all that stuff which is why I don't know why I asked to be in the bar scene because I've never exploded before", she said. She had asked to be set on fire. "That was me trying to conquer a fear. By the way, they would not allow me to do a full burn for insurance purposes, even though I argued that Burt Reynolds had done it once", stated Cody. "But apparently he got really hurt, so they would not let me. To me, there's nothing more horrifying than being stuck in a claustrophobic space as it is burning down so, to me, it was more like tapping into a personal fear. That's not tough."

=== Filming ===
In late 2007, Fox Atomic had plans to film Jennifer's Body before a possible writer's strike. When the Writers Guild of America strike began, shooting was then moved to March 7, 2008, in Burnaby, British Columbia, specifically at Robert Burnaby Park near Cariboo Hill Secondary School. Some of the scenes, particularly those situated in a school setting, were filmed in local Vancouver-area schools such as Vancouver Technical Secondary School, Langley Secondary School and University Hill Secondary School. The waterfalls scene was filmed at Cascade Falls in Cascade Falls Regional Park in British Columbia.

Fox said that while filming her highly anticipated kissing scene with Seyfried that Seyfried was "extremely uncomfortable" but that she herself was not. "I feel much safer with girls, so I felt more comfortable kissing [Seyfried] than kissing any of the other people that I had to kiss", she said. Seyfried's uneasiness in the scene caused "giggling fits" between takes. Seyfried said that neither of them wanted to do the kiss because they felt it was just for promotional purposes. She agreed with Fox that she was uneasy about acting out the scene. "It was my first time doing a real kissing scene with a woman", she stated. "It is just weird. It is a woman. With a woman's smell—soft and floraly—and maybe the pheromones are different. Something about it felt uncomfortable for me."

=== Music ===
Music was incorporated as an essential part of the film; there are "very specific bands" placed in band posters in some parts, such as in the selection of the band poster on the walls of the bar. Kusama said "[t]he music was a huge component of the movie" and this is first evident with "the songs that we see and hear performed, but then, just the vibe of the movie actually". She said, "As the movie progresses, it becomes a pretty clearly music-oriented movie. It's sort of a youth movie. Some of those bands were totally made up and some of them are not."

== Release ==
=== Critical response ===
==== Contemporary ====
The review aggregation website Rotten Tomatoes reports that 47% of critics gave the film positive reviews, based on 214 reviews, and an average rating of 5.40/10. The website's critical consensus states, "Jennifer's Body features occasionally clever dialogue but the horror/comic premise fails to be either funny or scary enough to satisfy." At Metacritic, which assigns a weighted average rating to reviews from mainstream critics, the film holds a score of 47 out of 100 based on 29 critics, indicating "mixed or average" reviews. Audiences polled by CinemaScore gave the film an average grade of "C−" on an A+ to F scale.

Film critic Roger Ebert enjoyed the film, dubbing it a "Twilight for boys" and saying "as a movie about a flesh-eating cheerleader, it's better than it has to be." Ebert said that within Cody there is "the soul of an artist, and her screenplay brings to this material a certain edge, a kind of gleeful relish, that's uncompromising. This isn't your assembly-line teen horror thriller". Additionally, he complimented Fox as "[coming] through" in her portrayal and "play[ing] the role straight". He gave the film three out of four stars. Rick Groen of The Globe and Mail gave the film three out of four stars. Peter Travers of Rolling Stone stated it is "Hot! Hot! Hot!" and that "Director Karyn Kusama is torn between duty to female empowerment and slasher convention". He credited Fox's portrayal as showing "a comic flair" that Transformers "never investigated". Tom Charity of CNN said "[the] last time a horror flick tried for a distinctly female point of view the result was Twilight, which was more of a wan gothic romance than a chiller" and "Fox makes a convincing vixen, callously picking up victims whenever her luster begins to fade. It's not hard to imagine she can have anyone who takes her fancy". Charity credited the dialogue as "bitingly smart, funny teen-speak ... along with sharp pop culture references".

Mary Pols of Time magazine called the film entertaining and reasoned "[t]here is a lot of intelligent camp here, and some sharply observed characterizations" and Cody and Kusama's "depiction of the ways in which women like Needy are willing to compromise themselves to indulge an ultimately less secure friend is spot-on". Dana Stevens of Slate praised the film for being "luscious and powerful, sexy and scary, maddening at times, but impossible to stop watching" and a "wicked black comedy with unexpected emotional resonance, one of the most purely pleasurable movies of the year so far". Elle's Karen Durbin said the film not only puts "a fresh spin on female-centric pop genres but also own[s] them outright" and is "rich with first-rate performances".

The Miami Herald's Rene Rodriguez likened the film's "[effective exploitation] of the genre as a metaphor for adolescent angst, female sexuality and the strange, sometimes corrosive bonds between girls who claim to be best friends" to Brian De Palma's 1976 film Carrie. Rodriguez applauded the film for being fearless when delving into the subject of teen sex and for reversing the notion that only "bad girls have sex when they're 16 [and the] good ones—those who, like Needy, do their homework and are responsible—never slide past first base". Nick Pinkerton of Sci Fi Weekly called Fox and Seyfried's kissing scene "the best close-up girl-girl liplock" since Cruel Intentions (1999), and A. O. Scott of The New York Times concluded "the movie deserves—and is likely to win—a devoted cult following, despite its flaws" and that "[these flaws] are mitigated by a sensibility that mixes playful pop-culture ingenuity with a healthy shot of feminist anger".

Giving a partially negative review of the film was Joshua Rothkopf of Time Out New York, who said the "movie has a centerfold sheen to it—and some lesbianic soft-core flirtation to match—as its plot dives deeply into Twilight-esque heavy-melo meltdown in the last act" and that "Cody throws one too many losses at Needy; the screenwriter loses her satiric way about halfway through. But for a while, this has real fangs". Ann Hornaday of The Washington Post said, "There's a certain kooky, kinky fun to be had with Jennifer's Body" but that "[a]dmittedly, this is the stuff of lurid adolescent distraction, not great cinema" and "is strictly a niche item but provides a goofy, campy bookend to Drag Me to Hell (2009) on the B-movie shelf. Watch it, forget it, move on". San Francisco Chronicle's Peter Hartlaub stated, "Enjoy the film for its witty dialogue and fun performances, but know that there isn't a single good scare. An episode of Murder, She Wrote has more thrills." Hartlaub felt the film is not bad, is "almost always pleasing" and that Fox "proves that she has some [acting] range" but "the chances that it will be somebody else's pop culture reference 27 years from now are slim to none". Joe Neumaier of New York Daily News said, "Fox merely needs to look either vacant or evil, which the Transformers boy-toy does spookily well" but "[w]ords and story are still the lifeblood of a movie, and Jennifer's Body is filled like a Twinkie with half-fleshed-out ideas". Disagreeing with Fox's performance, Chicago Tribune's Michael Phillips called Fox "a pretty bad actress" who "doesn't seem to get Cody's sense of humor. At all". He reasoned the "movie's partially redeemed by Seyfried, who makes her character more than a repository for audience sympathy" and "her make-out scene with Fox is handled with more suspense and care than anything else in the movie".

Michael Sragow of The Baltimore Sun described the only "perfect aspect" of Jennifer's Body as being its title. "No one is going to like this movie for its brain", he said. Claudia Puig of USA Today stated of the film, "Jennifer's Body is not as hot as you hope it would be". Where others praised the film's dialogue, MSNBC's Alonso Duralde called the writing lazy and "[w]orse still, all of Cody's trademark pop-culture–infused dialogue stands out as artificial and precious". Jennifer's Body, he said, wants "so badly" to be a Heathers-esque dark comedy, "but its shortcomings makes you appreciate why that earlier film was so great". Ty Burr of The Boston Globe also said the film wants to be like Heathers, and reminded him "a lot" of Heathers but the only scene in the film that "actually feels dangerous" is when the possessed Jennifer initiates a long and passionate kiss with Needy, which the film "very, very nervously backs away from" and that "Jennifer's Body falls into the dispiriting category of dumb movies made by smart people, in this case a glibly clever writer and a talented director who think a few wisecracks are enough to subvert the teen horror genre".

==== Retrospective ====
Jennifer's Body has been re-evaluated over the years. In 2018, Constance Grady reported in Vox that a new critical consensus was forming that appreciated the film as a "forgotten feminist classic". She stated that after the MeToo movement highlighted routine sexual harassment and misconduct in the media industry, the film's story of "a group of powerful men sacrificing a girl's body on the altar of their own professional advancement" became "uncomfortably familiar". This, according to Grady, allowed viewers to see the film, rather than as a sex fantasy, as a revenge fantasy as Jennifer uses her abused body against her attackers.

According to Cody, the film was marketed "all wrong". She had argued with executives who wanted "to market this to boys who like Megan Fox. That's who's going to see it. And I was like. No! This is a movie for girls too! That audience, they did not attempt to reach."

In a 2022 essay on its status as a classic queer and bisexual film, Carmen Maria Machado wrote that Jennifer's Body speaks to "what it means to experience parallel sexualities with your best friend as you punch through the last vestiges of childhood." Machado rejects accusations that the film is guilty of queerbaiting, considering it instead an effective depiction of the "central body of water that is bisexuality" which many queer people spend at least some of their life in.

=== Box office ===
Though the film was expected to pull in a significant number of the late teenage/young adult audience, particularly males aged 17 and older, and though Cody hoped for a large female turnout, it earned a "disappointing" $2.8 million on its opening Friday and $6.8 million in its opening weekend at the North American box office; the film placed #5, while 3D animated film Cloudy with a Chance of Meatballs placed #1 with $30.1 million. Produced for $16 million, Jennifer's Body did manage to attract the sizable female audience Cody wanted; 51% were female, with 70% of patrons under age 25. The film had been expected to benefit somewhat from its heavily marketed lesbian kissing scene between Fox and Seyfried, which, in addition to Fox being in the film, was thought to entice and successfully attract male viewers. Critic Jim Vejvoda at IGN stated that such a scene is not as shocking as it was in past decades and cannot be expected to significantly pull in an audience. The film grossed $16,204,793 domestically and $15,351,268 in international sales, for a worldwide total of $31,556,061.

Box-office analysts and critics debated the film's underperformance. Analyst Jeff Bock, of Exhibitor Relations, reasoned the film underperformed at the box office due to two reasons; the first, he said, is the genre. Bock stated that Americans get horror and comedy, but with the idea "of those two things together in one place, people suddenly get very dumb". "The horror-comedy genre is the toughest sell in Hollywood", he said. He noted films Tremors, Slither, Shaun of the Dead, Eight Legged Freaks and the Evil Dead series, and said that while many of those are considered critical and business successes, "none of them have brought in the megabucks that a simple horror or comedy can." In addition, he labeled the Scream franchise as more "straight-up horror" than comedy and stated Zombieland's box office performance would determine the horror-comedy genre's current viability.

Despite other R-rated horror films having centered around teenagers, some such as Scream having been successful, Bock said the second reason Jennifer's Body under-performed at the box office is the R-rating, which he described as a "killer" for the film. He said the film is set in high school and "sounds like the perfect package for teens" but that "the R rating banned many teens from the theaters" and the studio was left with "an R-rated film marketed to whom, exactly?" Nicole Sperling of Entertainment Weekly felt that it was a slow and disappointing weekend for the box office in general; 3D animated film Cloudy with a Chance of Meatballs was steep competition, and with low box office performances by the Matt Damon film The Informant! and Jennifer Aniston film Love Happens, she concluded that this may support "the current hypothesis floating around Hollywood, that movie stars no longer matter" and that it takes more than a name to open a film. S.T. VanAirsdale of Movieline echoed Sperling's sentiment about the weekend, as "some of the stinkiest high-profile openings in recent memory". He concluded five reasons for Jennifer's Body's underperformance at the box office. The first, he said, is the distributor. "20th Century Fox's genre wing, Fox Atomic, had Jennifer's Body in the can by the time the mother ship shut it down last spring", he said. "Instead of offloading the film to Fox Searchlight, which nimbly maneuvered Diablo Cody's previous brainchild Juno to awards-season lucre in 2007, a decision was somehow reached to fill a gap in Big Fox's early fall slate with a gory" and "post-feminist horror romp starring Megan Fox and Amanda Seyfried". VanAirsdale classified this as a "[b]ig mistake" and that "[y]ou'd have to go back to The Devil Wears Prada to find an example of a Fox release that worked without a genuine male lead; you'd probably have to go back to Aliens to find a genre example of such that they pulled off successfully." He named the second reason as the marketing, stating that the film was not well-marketed (whether by billboards, transit posters, lobby standees, or other promotional venues), even in New York City.

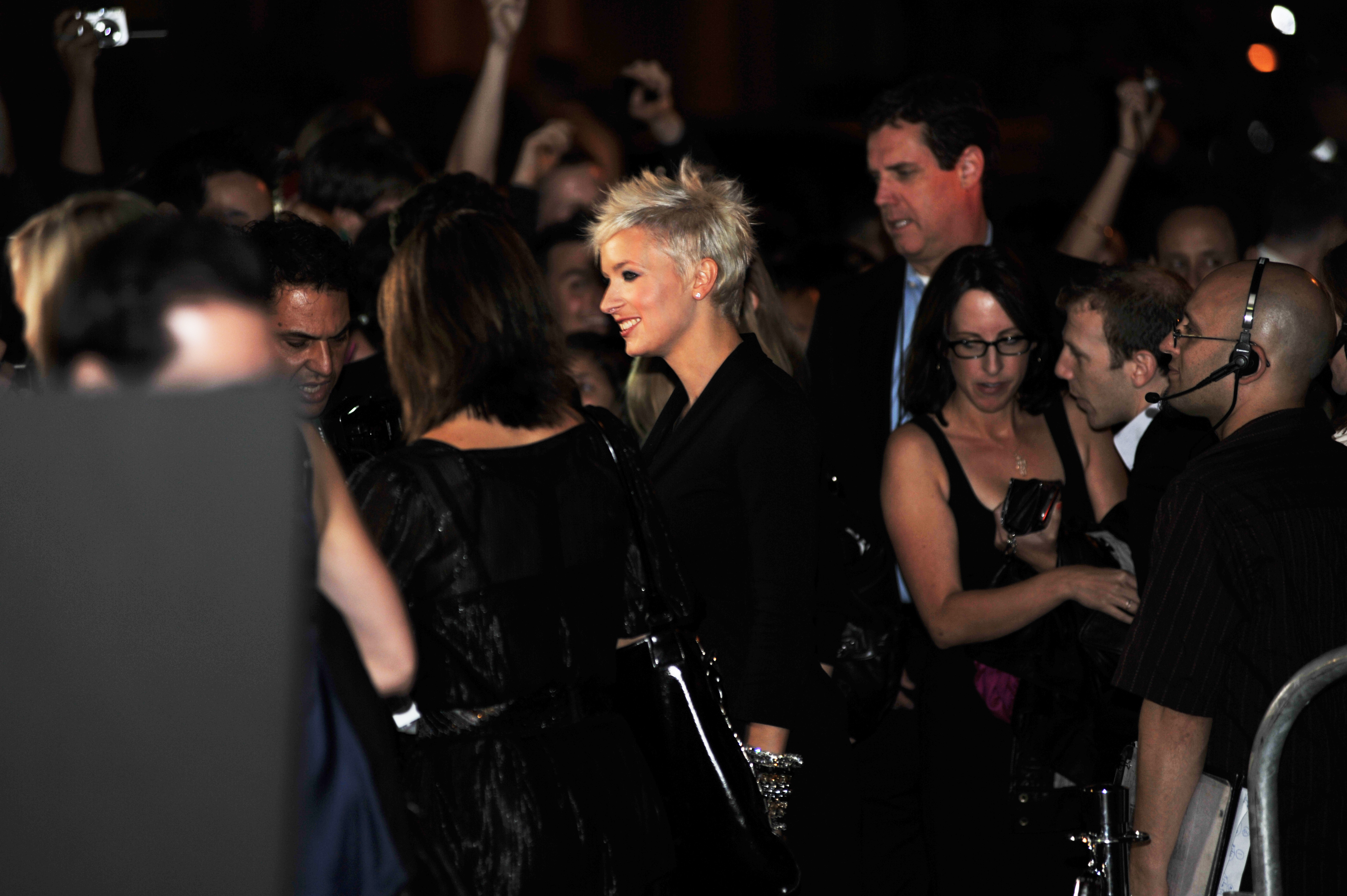
Cody (center) at Jennifer's Body screening at the 2009 Toronto International Film Festival.

VanAirsdale cited the release date and screening as the third and fourth reasons; he said there was confusion about what day the film was going to debut in theaters, and that Toronto is "a nation removed from the audience where the film's actual momentum had been accruing for at least a month" and that "this rarely works for early fall releases; not because news doesn't travel, obviously, but because it peels away a layer of accessibility that accompanies New York and L.A. bows." The final reason, he attributed to the critics, believing that the fusion of horror and teen comedy confused some of them. He mentioned Ty Burr's review in particular, and stated that the film could perhaps have used more horror and been funnier, but that the film is "ultimately a movie about two teenage girls' misadventures in victimization" and that "[t]he jokes are virtually incidental to the friction imposed on women who happen to be two sides of the same coin. Who's the monster, and who made the monster? Sorry if you wanted Heathers with demons, fellas. Equipment's cheap these days; perhaps make your own?"

Hollywood.com box-office analyst and President Paul Dergarabedian said "the poor numbers don't mean Fox can't open a movie." "It may be a matter of just choosing the right projects for her", he told Associated Press. "She's trying to find a world beyond Transformers, and she will. She's young and has a lot of promise."

=== Home media ===
20th Century Fox Home Entertainment released the film on DVD and Blu-ray on December 29, 2009, in the United States and Canada. In Australia, the DVD and Blu-ray was released on May 18, 2010 by 20th Century Fox Home Entertainment South Pacific. The film opened at #11 at the DVD sales chart, making $1.6 million in the first week off 104,000 DVD units. There is a rated and an unrated version of the film, with the unrated version running about five minutes longer than the theatrical version. The UK Blu-ray lacks most of the extras found on the locked US release.

On March 20, 2019, Rupert Murdoch sold most of 21st Century Fox's film and television assets to Disney, and Jennifer's Body was one of the films included in the deal. In 2025, Jennifer's Body was made available on streaming service Hulu, which was one of the additional assets Disney acquired from Fox.

== Soundtrack ==
The film's soundtrack was released by Fueled by Ramen on August 25, 2009, and featured previously released music by various indie rock and alternative rock bands such as White Lies, Florence + The Machine, Silversun Pickups and Black Kids. It also features pop punk band All Time Low and electropop singer Little Boots. In addition, the album features new songs from pop rock artists such as Cobra Starship and Panic! at the Disco and Paramore's lead singer Hayley Williams. The first single from the soundtrack is "New Perspective" by Panic! at the Disco.

The ending sequence of the film itself features a song, "Violet", from the album Live Through This by Hole. This same album also features a song titled "Jennifer's Body". In total, the film features 22 songs, most of which are included on the soundtrack.

== Graphic novel ==
As a tie-in to the film, Boom! Studios produced a Jennifer's Body graphic novel. The graphic novel expands on the film's universe and Jennifer's murders of the boys. It was written by Black Metal's Rick Spears, with the first nine pages illustrated by Jim Mahfood (Clerks). Two covers, in Fox's likeness, were designed; one for the direct market by Eric Jones (available only in comic specialty stores), and the other by Frank Cho for the mass market focusing more on "hellish Jennifer stories" with art by Mahfood, Hack/Slash's Tim Seely, DMZ's Nikki Cook, and Popgun's Ming Doyle. The novel was released in August 2009.

The novel features less of Jennifer than the film, but does capture her "going in for the kill" several times. It focuses heavily on following her soon-to-be victims and provides information on their personalities not elaborated on in the film so that readers can better conclude whether the boys deserved to be murdered. The novel consists of four chapters, with a prologue and an epilogue, with art provided for each by different artists. Each one follows a different boy and what is happening in his life just before Jennifer kills him.

On creating the story, Spears stated, "The best part for me as a writer was to show some events from the movie from a different point of view, sort of like Rashomon for you Kurosawa fans. And with comics we can get into the character's [sic] heads in a way that works well in comics and novels more so than in film." He stated, "... I was using the medium to change what we really know about these characters and twist around what we see in the movies. All the academics aside, it's also very funny and gore splattered."

Spears stated that while writing the stories, the film was still being made and he had not seen any of it at the time. He mainly learned about the characters through the script. "I got to read the screenplay. It was kinda crazy writing characters that were being changed on set and in the editing process. I had to bob and weave to keep up but that was all part of the fun", he said.

== Possible sequel ==
In January 2024, screenwriter Diablo Cody expressed her interest in a possible sequel sixteen years after the first film. She said, "Nothing makes me happier than when a person approaches me and tells me that they love this movie."

== See also ==
- Ginger Snaps, a 2000 film with a similar plot.
- All Cheerleaders Die, a 2013 queer horror comedy with a similar plot.
- "Good 4 U", a 2021 song by Olivia Rodrigo which contains references to Jennifer's Body in the music video.
- "Jennifer's Body", a 2023 song by rapper Ken Carson which contains references to the movie in its lyrics.
- Lisa Frankenstein, a 2024 comedy film written by Diablo Cody that takes place within the same continuity as Jennifer's Body.
- "Make You Mine", a 2024 song by Madison Beer which contains many references to Jennifer's Body in the music video.
