= SS (Ken Carson song) =

2024 song by Ken Carson

Song by Ken Carson

from the album A Great Chaos (Deluxe)
- Released: July 5, 2024
- Recorded: 2023
- Genre: Rage; trap
- Length: 3:04
- Label: Opium; Interscope
- Songwriters: Kenyatta Frazier Jr.; Bart van Hoewijk; Danny O'Brien; Jaylan Lowe; Kylian Emmanuel Kante
- Producers: Bart How; Lil 88; Mnclzy; Kyl

Music video
- "SS" on YouTube

"SS" (stylized in lowercase) is a song by American rapper Ken Carson from the deluxe edition of his third studio album, A Great Chaos (2024). Released on July 5, 2024, through Opium and Interscope Records, the song became one of Carson's most commercially successful tracks and gained popularity through social media platforms such as TikTok.

== Background ==
The song was recorded during sessions for A Great Chaos in 2023. Prior to its official release, snippets of the track circulated online among fans and within communities associated with the Opium label. The song was later officially released on the deluxe edition of the album.

The song's title is commonly interpreted as an abbreviation for actress Sydney Sweeney, who is referenced repeatedly throughout the lyrics.

== Composition ==
Musically, "ss" has been described as a rage rap and trap song featuring distorted synths, heavy bass, and energetic vocal delivery associated with the Opium sound. The production was handled by Bart How, Lil 88, Mnclzy, and Kyl.

Lyrically, the track focuses on themes of fame, designer fashion, relationships, and Carson's chaotic rockstar persona. The song became especially known online for its references to actress Sydney Sweeney.

== Reception ==
Following its release, "ss" became one of the most popular songs from the deluxe version of A Great Chaos. Critics and publications covering Carson's rise within the rage rap scene highlighted the song's aggressive production style and viral appeal.

Pitchfork writer Alphonse Pierre praised Carson's chaotic production choices and described A Great Chaos as an important release within modern rage rap.

== Personnel ==
Credits adapted from Apple Music.

Musicians

- Ken Carson – vocals, songwriting
- Bart How – production, songwriting
- Lil 88 – production, songwriting
- Mnclzy – production
- Kyl – production, songwriting

Technical

- Benjamin Lidsky – mixing
- Corey Moon – recording
- Colin Leonard – mastering
