= Margiela (song) =

2025 single by Ken Carson

Single by Ken Carson
- Released: November 14, 2025
- Recorded: August 2025
- Genre: Hip-hop; rage; trap
- Length: 2:18
- Label: Opium; Interscope
- Songwriters: Kenyatta Frazier Jr.; Nayvadius Wilburn; Grant Feldman; Hunter Brown; Jerry Cruz; Lola Paulette
- Producers: Gfeld; Akachi; 16yrold; lolaxva

Ken Carson singles chronology
"Catastrophe" (2025)	"Margiela" (2025)	"The Acronym" (2025)

Music video
- "Margiela" on YouTube

"Margiela" (stylized in lowercase) is a song by American rapper Ken Carson. It was released on November 14, 2025, through Opium and Interscope Records. Carson recorded the song in August 2025 with producers Akachi, Gfelds, 16yrold, and lolaxva, shortly after the release of his album More Chaos. "Margiela" features a frantic, nightmarish, blown out, and distorted instrumental. Over the instrumental, Carson boasts and flaunts his wealth and success, while rapping about the French luxury house, Maison Margiela. "Margiela" serves as Carson's third consecutive release following the release of "Yes" and "Catastrophe" (both stylized in lowercase as well).

Prior to the release, "Margiela" was previewed on August 20, 2025, by Carson via Instagram live. Following the track's release, it was able to garner nearly one million streams within the first day, marking it as Carson's second track to hit that milestone, behind his platinum-certified single "Overseas." An accompanying music video was released on the same day, shot during the Antagonist Tour alongside other Opium members.

== Background and release ==
On April 11, 2025, Carson released his fourth studio album, More Chaos. Following its release, Carson would go on to preview "Margiela" via an Instagram Livestream on August 20, 2025. After staying quiet for a few months, Carson would return on the day of Halloween to release his single "Yes", then on November 6, Carson would release "Catastrophe".

"Margiela" was released as the third consecutive single by Carson on November 14, 2025. A music video for the song was released the same day, featuring simplistic visuals and periodic buffering and throbbers. The video symbolically compares the Wi-Fi buffers to that of Carson's lifestyle, arguing that it can't keep up with it.

== Composition and lyrics ==
"Margiela" comes in at a running time of two minutes, and eighteen seconds. Carson co-wrote the song with producers Akachi, 16yrold, Gfeld, and lolaxva, whilst Ben Lidsky helped with the mixing, and Colin Leonard helped with the mastering. Seeing Carson stay on the same genre of rage, the instrumental shown on "Margiela" features a blown out, distorted, nightmarish, and frantic beat. The vocals on the track sees Carson flaunt his wealth and success, while touching on the subtopics of lean, women, wealth, and weapons. According to Quincy Dominic of Rating Games Music, "Margiela" rides on "trippy trap production that will have the weed brownie you just ate doing the 6'7 dance in your system," setting a hypnotic backdrop for Ken Carson's laid-back but menacing delivery. Throughout the track, he "flexes on his willingness to indulge in toxins, intimidate his opps, and get nasty with baddies," flowing freely without a traditional structure. The result is "chaotic, unapologetic, and pure Ken Carson," perfectly capturing his reckless confidence and experimental trap energy.

Davy Reed of The Face wrote how Carson casually slurs through themes of luxury fashion and hedonistic sex, treating excess like an everyday habit. The track's warped synths and heavy AutoTune give it a surreal, almost otherworldly sound that feels intentionally strange and hypnotic. Alex Harris of NeonMusic wrote how "Margiela" is a blown-out trap banger where Carson dives into distortion, excess, and controlled chaos. With rattling 808s and hypnotic synths from Akachi, 16yrold, Gfelds, Lolaxva, and DJ Moon, the track feels like it's "blasting from a speaker about to explode". Harris also wrote how Carson delivers with nonchalant menace, ditching traditional structure for a quick, chaotic adrenaline rush. Lyrically, Harris wrote how Carson's deep in hedonism—designer flexes, lean references, threats, and sexual bravado—treating destruction like a daily habit. Future's intro nods to the toxic blueprint Carson pushes even further. Overall, Harris summarized how "Margiela" shows Carson in a creative stride: confident, chaotic, and distinct. If it ends up on Lost Files 5, that project could be a standout.
