= A Great Chaos =

Studio album by Ken Carson
- Released: October 13, 2023
- Recorded: 2022–2023
- Genre: Rage
- Length: 46:59
- Labels: Opium; Interscope
- Producers: AM; Bart How; Bhristo; Clif Shayne; Epreme; F1lthy; Gab3; KP Beatz; Lbw; Legion; Lil 88; Lucian; Lukrative; Lvis; MaxFlames; Misogi; Nick Spiders; Outtatown; Semsi; Skai; Ssor.t; Star Boy; TM88; Warpstr; Warren Hunter

Ken Carson chronology
X (2022)	A Great Chaos (2023)	More Chaos (2025)

Singles from A Great Chaos
- 1. "I Need U" Released: February 14, 2023

A Great Chaos is the third studio album by the American rapper Ken Carson, released on October 13, 2023, through Opium and Interscope Records. The album's production was handled by various producers, including F1lthy, Lil 88, Star Boy, Outtatown, and TM88, and features guest appearances from Destroy Lonely and Lil Uzi Vert. A rage album, A Great Chaos is characterized by its maximalist production with glitchy, digitized instrumentation, hedonistic attitude coupled with moments of vulnerability and angst, and horror references. The album's lead single, "I Need U", was released on February 14, 2023. A deluxe edition with seven bonus tracks was released on July 5, 2024; it was preceded by the single "Overseas", released on April 12.

A Great Chaos received critical acclaim, with praise for its appeal and production. Considered Carson's breakout album, (Note: By Billboard, Complex, GQ, and Rolling Stone. Additionally, HipHopDX credited the album with making 2023 Carson's "breakout year".) it earned 48,000 album-equivalent units in its first week to debut at number 11 on the US Billboard 200, becoming Carson's first top 20 album, and performed well in Canada and Europe. The album was certified Platinum by the Recording Industry Association of America (RIAA) in August 2025. Carson embarked on the Chaos Tour of Europe and the United States in support of the album from July to November 2024. As of April 2025, the album has earned 1.3 million album-equivalent units worldwide.

== Background and recording ==
In July 2022, Ken Carson released his second studio album, X, through Opium and Interscope Records. While it was his first album to chart on the US Billboard 200 chart, it was not well received by critics. According to Lavender Alexandria of HotNewHipHop, Carson's style on X was compared unfavorably to Opium labelhead Playboi Carti and led to Carson being dismissed as a "Playboi Carti rip-off". Despite this, Carson said he was not influenced by the reception of X when making A Great Chaos, as he "[does not] make [his] music for critics".

The production of A Great Chaos was handled by more than a dozen producers, including F1lthy, Lil 88, Star Boy, Outtatown and TM88. Carson said he would go to the studio every night to record material, including when he was on tour, and try and work out an idea from beats his producers sent him beforehand. He considered potential crowd reactions when recording his songs. Lucian, one of the album's producers and a frequent collaborator, said that Carson would sometimes "instantly know what to do on [a beat]" and come out with a song in a single take. Examples of this occurring include "Hardcore", and "Overseas". The album was completed by August 2023.

== Composition ==
=== Overview ===
[The title] literally just speaks for itself. It's a great chaos. It's a great work, but it sounds massive.

— Ken Carson

A Great Chaos is a rage album. According to David Crone of AllMusic, it sees Carson "[push] his signature sound even further with wilder flows and more forward-thinking beats". Characterized by its maximalist production, it features "digitized, crunchy instrumentation", and "excessively" loud mixing centered on Carson's vocals, whose delivery was described as "radically blunt" by Mano Sundaresan of Pitchfork. Matt Mitchell of Paste called Carson's delivery "ferocious and meticulous" and highlighted its influences from Young Thug and Carti. Abe Beame of GQ described its tracks as dense, layered "walls" and "squalls of sound featuring dueling pluggy arpeggios laid under droning liquid-metallic bass lines and soft, gorgeous Kraftwerk melodies". Zachary Horvath of HotNewHipHop highlighted "Fighting My Demons", "SS", and "Overseas" for their "glitchy, booming, and futuristic trap-like beats" and Carson's "slurred deliveries and blunt lyricism". Will Gedron of HipHopDX, Jeff Ihaza of Rolling Stone, and Sundaresan also highlighted the album's tighter pacing compared to Carson's previous works, particularly X. Opium labelmate and frequent collaborator Destroy Lonely appears with Carson on "Singapore", "Paranoid", and "Like This", with Lil Uzi Vert joining both artists on the latter track.

In a 2023 interview with Clash, Carson said that he aimed to express energy in relation to where his life was on A Great Chaos. Brandon Brown, a former Vice President of A&R at Interscope, told XXL in a 2024 interview that he felt Carson was "talking about different experiences, different phases of things he's experiencing now, from pre-signing to being signed and more famous". Hedonism is a pervading attitude throughout the album, though John Norris of VMan highlighted moments of vulnerability. Sundaresan said that Carson's lyrics sometimes fall into "Opium-core" angst. Yannik Gölz of laut.de highlighted the concept of "internet horror"—with references to creepypastas, nightcore and low-quality true crime uploads—as pervasive in the album's visuals, song titles and "timbres", which he felt provided context to its "muddy mixing" and "confrontational demeanor". (Note: Quote translated from the original text: "Das macht dann wiederum auch Sinn mit dem schlammigen Mixing und dem konfrontativen Gebaren.") Lucian recalled that horror films would often be played in the background during studio sessions to cultivate a mood. Gölz did not categorize the album as horrorcore despite its horror influences. Grant Rindener of XXL shared this sentiment regarding Carson's lyrics, though felt "[he] and Opium can be clearly traced to that lineage".

=== Songs ===
"Jennifer's Body" features "glitchy" production and Auto-Tuned vocals from Carson, atop a synth instrumental. The song drew inspiration from the cult horror film of the same name, with its "stuttered" intro being a homage to "Good Riddance (Time of Your Life)" by the American punk rock band Green Day, one of Carson's influences and his favorite band. The song's hook displays Carson's mixed feelings towards loving, but not necessarily needing, women. On "Fighting My Demons", Carson asks "Where the fuck my blunt? Where the fuck my cup? Where the fuck my reef?", before the song breaks into "off-the-wall production" featuring 808 drums, "chiming" synths and organ-like bass. Carson moves from "straight-line raps and pagan chants" in the song's verses, "spewing out unhinged one-liners, sports references, and weirdly addictive noises", according to Eric Skelton of Complex. Norris described its lyrics as "confessional". Carson said that they were not just about himself, as "everybody's got their own demons. [...] And even if they don't call them 'demons', they're problems." Following a "haunting" instrumental break, he ends the song with a "cognizant yet repetitive" refrain that Yousef Srour of HipHopDX likened to the 2023 Travis Scott and Carti song "Fein". "Singapore" is an "icy duet" between Carson and Lonely that "evokes stripper parties", according to Norris. "Lose It" features heavily distorted 808s and was described by Jordan Darville of The Fader as "the sound of a panic attack", with Carson rapping "joylessly" about his drug use and the weapons he keeps for safety. "Hardcore", which Sundaresan compared to The Wizrd (2019) by Future, sees Carson repeating four words over changing sonic textures. "Me n My Kup" was influenced by Gucci Mane's "Shirt Off" and features tightly stacked synths. A writer for Slant Magazine wrote how the track is so "anarchic" that it sounds as if they're "about to come apart from the seams". On the overdriven "Florida trap" song "Succubus", Carson obsesses over an ex-partner atop a "blinding fog" of heavy bass.

"Paranoid" is a trap song that displays Carson and Lonely utilizing eccentric flows to rap about wealth, women, and guns. Norris highlighted one of the song's lyrics—"I fuck Barbie bitches/All my hoes be plastic"—as a reference to Barbie, whose Ken doll line is Carson's namesake, and his debut extended play Boy Barbie (2020). "Pots" features a glitchy, hypnotic atmosphere, with a "rolling beat" that Sundaresan likened to the robotic spiders from the 2002 film Spy Kids 2: The Island of Lost Dreams. Alphonse Pierre, also of Pitchfork, viewed it as playing the "Opium handbook" with its lyrical allusions to the occult. "Like This" centers around a chorus by Lil Uzi Vert, who asks in varying alterations: "Why my jeans fit like this?". A writer for AllMusic credited Uzi's appearance with providing some "pop stability" to A Great Chaos. "Overtime" features a "continuous ticker of hi-hat and snare rolls", per Gedron. A favorite of Carson's, "Vampire Hour" was cited by AllMusic's writer as an example of the album's moments of "unsophisticated, raging fun". On "Rockstar Lifestyle", Carson embraces a rockstar persona; when asked what the term meant to him by Pierre, he said it was "about pushing the boundaries and doing whatever the fuck you want". "I Need U" is a love song driven by "buzzing synths" and heavy 808s, with Carson's Auto-Tuned vocals providing additional melody; a writer for AllMusic compared his "vocal inflections and haunted melodic hooks" with Young Thug.

The deluxe edition of A Great Chaos features seven bonus tracks which show Carson "stick[ing] to the script" of the main album, according to Vibe's Preezy Brown. Complex's Antonio Mejori described "Mewtwo" as being one of the album's "most lighthearted and whimsical songs", with Carson rapping playfully about the mascot of Cocoa Puffs and comparing his girl to the titular Pokémon over a "quirky" lead melody, strummed chords, and "delicate" bell chimes. "SS" sees Carson compare the size of his gun's drum magazine to the breasts of the American actress Sydney Sweeney. "Overseas" is driven by 808-heavy production, an "electric" beat, and subtle melody. Its lyrics see Carson offer an update on his recent life—spent mostly on tour—and reflecting on his rise to prominence. He also mentions the European cities London, Paris, and Amsterdam, the first three stops of his Chaos Tour.

== Release and promotion ==
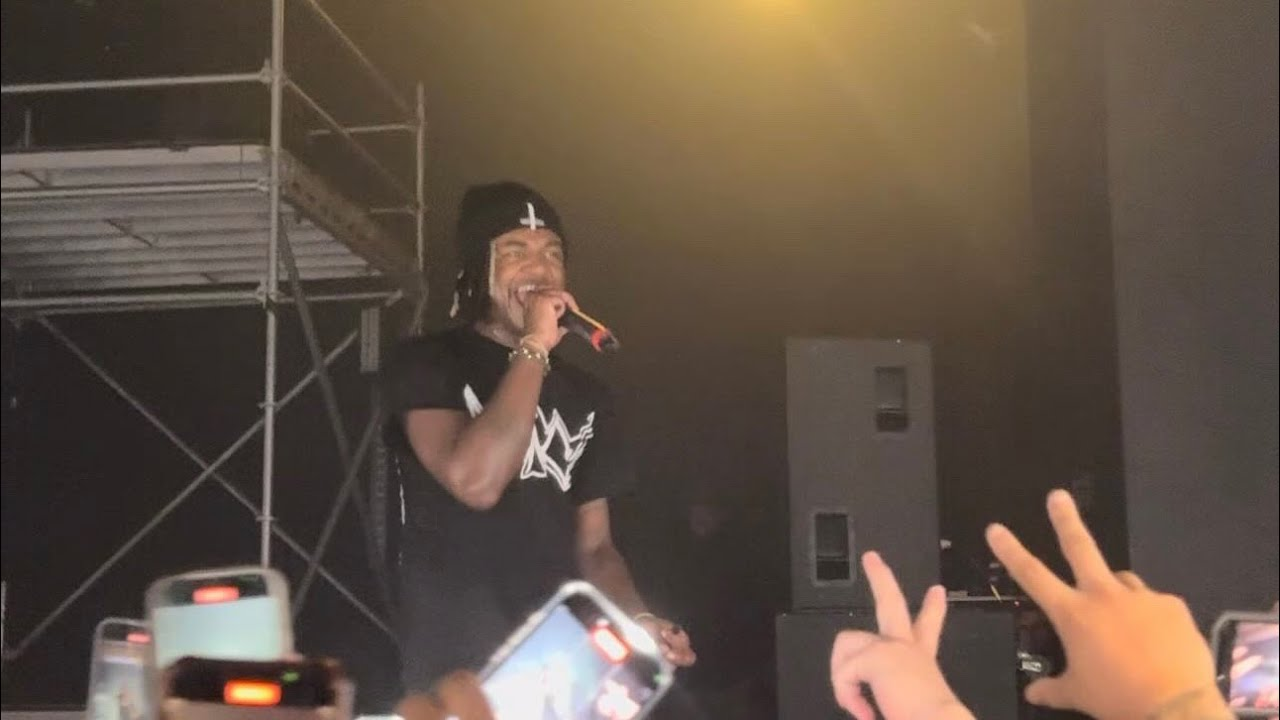
Ken Carson performing in Milwaukee on the Chaos Tour in November 2024

Carson began teasing A Great Chaos in late 2022, when he posted a snippet of "Paranoid". After releasing his fourth mixtape, Lost Files 4, in January 2023, Carson released the album's lead single, "I Need U", on February 14. Fans on Reddit speculated the album would be released in July 2023, coinciding with the release months of his debut album, Project X (2021), and X. On June 2, Carson announced the album's title and an initial release date of July 17; an early version of its tracklist was shared on June 25. "It's Over" was intended as the second single, but never released, and the album ultimately missed its original release date due to sample clearance issues. It was ultimately released on October 13, 2023. The album was leaked in its entirety on a Discord server four days prior to its release, much to Carson's chagrin. On October 12, an album launch party was held at the Silo dance club in Brooklyn. Carson performed "Singapore" and "Paranoid" with Destroy Lonely. The show ended with a headlined performance by Carti. Music videos for "Jennifer's Body", "Fighting My Demons", and "Succubus" were released after the album.

On April 12, 2024, Carson made his debut performance at Coachella, where he performed material from A Great Chaos live for the first time. That same day, he released "Overseas" as the lead single from the album's forthcoming deluxe edition. Between May 28 and June 2, 2024, Carson supported the Red Hot Chili Peppers on the first three dates of the North American leg of the band's Unlimited Love Tour. Following the release of A Great Chaos (Deluxe) on July 5, Carson embarked on his headlining Chaos Tour of Europe and the United States, which took place between July 8 and November 21, 2024. Footage filmed during the tour's first three dates was used in a music video for "Overseas", released on October 19. During the tour, Carson worked on finishing tracks for his fourth album More Chaos (2025). The tour has been credited with raising the profile of its supporting act, 2hollis. On December 15, 2024, Carson performed at Rolling Loud Miami.

== Critical reception ==
Professional ratings
Review scores
Source	Rating
AllMusic	4/5 stars
HipHopDX	3.9/5
laut.de	4/5 stars
The Needle Drop	3/10
Pitchfork	7.8/10
Tom Hull – on the Web	B+

A Great Chaos received critical acclaim; according to Elias Andrews of HotNewHipHop, the album garnered Carson "the best reviews of his career". A writer for AllMusic praised Carson for taking greater creative risks, deeming it "a fun and engaging listening experience" and a "huge step up" from his prior output. Brown, for Vibe, called the album "some of [Carson's] best work yet", highlighting "Fighting My Demons", "Hardcore", "Overtime", "Vampire Hour", and "Nightcore" as standouts showcasing him "hitting on all cylinders". Chris Richards of The Washington Post called it "the most flat-out exciting album" of 2023, praising its production. The Face's Davy Reed called it an "impressive album" that "dragged the scuzzy rage rap sound in new directions."

Mano Sundaresan of Pitchfork described A Great Chaos as "a creative breakthrough, flipping the script on Atlanta rap production" and opined that the album "may well be the next crucial LP" in the development of rage music, after Carti's Whole Lotta Red (2020). Paul Meara of BET viewed it as one of Opium's "more memorable drops" and said it "proved the [rage] genre is in great hands." Gölz of laut.de remarked that although the album was not "great art or revolutionary", it had a "coherent look and a coherent mood" that distinguished Carson from other rage music artists, including Carti and Yeat. (Note: Quotes are translated from the original text: " 'A Great Chaos' schafft Ken aber als einer der wenigen, seiner Ära einen kohärenten Look und eine kohärente Stimmung zu geben. [...] Ich würde nicht sagen, dass das hier große Kunst oder die Revolution wäre.) Mitchell, Sundaresan and Gölz all felt that whilst Carson's lyricism was weak, it ultimately came secondary to his delivery and presentation. Gedron of HipHopDX felt that Carson had managed to make an album matching with his attempts to cultivate an "enigmatic persona", but its "expertly constructed" production made it hard to "recognize [his] humanity".

A Great Chaos was listed as one of the best albums of 2023 by Complex, Slant Magazine, and The Washington Post, with Rolling Stone and Paste listing it as one of 2023's best hip-hop albums. HotNewHipHop, HipHopDX and Complex listed "Fighting My Demons" as one of the best songs of 2023. The Fader ranked "Jennifer's Body" as the 60th best song of 2023, whilst Rolling Stone ranked it as the year's sixth best rap song. Pitchfork included "Lose It" in its list of the best rap songs of the year. Complex ranked "SS" as the 42nd best song of 2024. Also in 2024, Pitchfork ranked A Great Chaos at number 86 on its list of "The 100 Best Albums of the 2020s So Far". The album is considered Carson's breakout album. According to Vivian Medithi of The Fader, the album "notched new commercial and critical highs" for rage music, with Carson establishing himself as "the face of [the genre] in 2024" through his greater "consistency" compared to his Opium labelmates. Writing in Complex that same year, Kieran Press-Reynolds believed that the album's "hyper-cluttered" style of rage was already proving influential on rappers such as OsamaSon. In 2025, Elania Bernstein of Hypebeast opined that it had become "the very blueprint for post-SoundCloud rage-trap as a whole."

== Commercial performance ==
A Great Chaos debuted at number 11 on the US Billboard 200, earning 48,507 album-equivalent units in its first week, with 1,336 coming from pure album sales. It was Carson's first top 20 album in the United States. The album was certified Gold by the Recording Industry Association of America (RIAA) on September 18, 2024, and Platinum on August 28, 2025. "Fighting My Demons", "SS", and "Overseas" were also certified Platinum by the RIAA; the latter became Carson's first charting song on the US Billboard Hot 100 chart, debuting at number 79. "Green Room", "Jennifer's Body", "Me n My Kup", "Succubus", "Paranoid", "I Need U", and "Mewtwo" were certified Gold. A Great Chaos also performed well in Canada and Europe. The album debuted at number 18 on the Billboard Canadian Albums chart, and was certified Platinum by Music Canada on August 7, 2025. As of April 2025, A Great Chaos and its deluxe edition have earned over 828,000 album-equivalent units in the United States and 1.3 million worldwide, according to Billboard. In July 2026, Universal Music Group reported the album to have received more than 3 billion global streams.

== Track listing ==
A Great Chaos track listing
No.	Title	Writer(s)	Producer(s)	Length
1.	"Green Room"	Kenyatta Frazier Jr.; Pierre Thevenot; Richard Ortiz; Ștefan Cișmigiu	F1lthy; Lucian; Lukrative	3:09
2.	"Jennifer's Body"	Frazier; Kenneth Pannu; Cișmigiu	KP Beatz; Lucian	2:39
3.	"Fighting My Demons"	Frazier; Anton Martin Mendo; Bart van Hoewijk; Olle Elvis Zijstra; Tobias Dekker; Warren Hunter	Bart How; Lvis; Outtatown; Star Boy; Hunter	2:30
4.	"Singapore" (featuring Destroy Lonely)	Frazier; Bobby Sandimanie III; Bryan Simmons; Jalan Lowe; Luuk Benjamin Wanmaker; Nicholas Spires	LBW; Lil 88; Nick Spiders; TM88	2:32
5.	"Lose It"	Frazier; Gabriel Rousseau; Keifa Carter	Gab3; Legion	2:21
6.	"Hardcore"	Frazier; Mendo; Arman Andican; Christopher Quillin; Ethan Andrade; Dekker	AM; Bhristo; Outtatown; Star Boy; Warpstr	2:05
7.	"Me n My Kup"	Frazier; Mendo; Lowe; Carter; Dekker; Hunter	Legion; Lil 88; Outtatown; Star Boy; Warren Hunter	3:54
8.	"It's Over"	Frazier; Mendo; Andican; Lowe; Johnny Peng; Dekker; Zain Siddiqui	Star Boy; Lil 88; AM; Misogi; Skai; Outtatown	1:36
9.	"Succubus"	Frazier; Andican; Ortiz	AM; F1lthy	2:30
10.	"Paranoid" (featuring Destroy Lonely)	Frazier; Sandimanie; Thevenot; Ortiz; Cișmigiu	F1lthy; Lucian; Lukrative	2:08
11.	"Pots"	Frazier; Clifton Shayne; Thevenot	Clif Shayne; Lucian	2:10
12.	"Like This" (featuring Lil Uzi Vert and Destroy Lonely)	Frazier; Sandimanie; Semsi Salvino; Symere Woods	Semsi	3:13
13.	"Overtime"	Frazier; Erik Cordova; Lowe	Epreme; Lil 88	1:47
14.	"Vampire Hour"	Frazier; Mendo; Wang; Quillin; Dekker	Bhristo; Outtatown; Star Boy	2:34
15.	"Nightcore"	Frazier; Thevenot; Cișmigiu	Lucian; Lukrative	3:07
16.	"Nightcore 2"	Frazier; Andican; Shayne; Cișmigiu	AM; Clif Shayne; Lucian	3:03
17.	"Rockstar Lifestyle"	Frazier; Salvino; Thomas Ross	Semsi; Ssor.t	3:13
18.	"I Need U"	Frazier; Max Rafael; Cișmigiu	Lucian; MaxFlames	2:29
Total length:				46:59

A Great Chaos (Deluxe) bonus tracks
No.	Title	Writer(s)	Producer(s)	Length
19.	"Loading"	Frazier; Shayne	Clif Shayne	3:07
20.	"More Chaos"	Frazier; Shayne; Spiders	Clif Shayne; Nick Spiders	2:21
21.	"Toxic"	Frazier; Carter; Johnny Peng	Legion; Skai	2:45
22.	"Leather Jacket"	Frazier; Rupert Howarth	Perto	2:38
23.	"Mewtwo"	Frazier; Shayne	Clif Shayne	2:08
24.	"SS"	Frazier; van Hoewjik; Danny O'Brien; Lowe; Kylian Kante	Bart How; Lil 88; Mnclzy; Kyl; Star Boy	3:04
25.	"Overseas"	Frazier; Spiders; Thevenot; Oliver Brown; Cismigiu	Lucian; Lukrative; Nick Spiders; Esko	2:21
Total length:				65:23

Notes

- "It's Over" samples an earlier Ken Carson song, "Freestyle 3".
- "Pots" is a backronym for "Pouring Out the Syrup".
- "I Need U" and all the songs included in the deluxe edition are stylized in lowercase.
- "SS" is short for "Sydney Sweeney".

== Personnel ==
Credits adapted from AllMusic, Apple Music, and Tidal.

- Benjamin Lidsky – recording engineer (1, 2, 6, 9, 11, 13, 15, 16, 18, 19), mixing (19–25)
- Ben Thomas - recording engineer (12, 17)
- Corey Moon – recording engineer (3–5, 7, 10, 14, 20–25)
- Ellantre "Tre5" Williams - recording engineer (8)
- Roark Bailey - mixing engineer (1–18)
- Colin Leonard - mastering

== Charts ==
=== Weekly charts ===
Weekly chart performance for A Great Chaos
Chart (2023)	Peak position
Australian Hip Hop/R&B Albums (ARIA)	34
Australian Hitseekers Albums (ARIA)	4
Austrian Albums (Ö3 Austria)	31
Belgian Albums (Ultratop Flanders)	56
Belgian Albums (Ultratop Wallonia)	120
Canadian Albums (Billboard)	18
Dutch Albums (Album Top 100)	51
Finnish Albums (Suomen virallinen lista)	35
French Albums (SNEP)	155
German Albums (Offizielle Top 100)	45
Hungarian Albums (MAHASZ)	24
Icelandic Albums (Tónlistinn)	14
Lithuanian Albums (AGATA)	9
New Zealand Albums (RMNZ)	21
Polish Albums (ZPAV)	15
Swiss Albums (Schweizer Hitparade)	13
UK Albums (Official Charts)	43
US Billboard 200	11
US Top R&B/Hip-Hop Albums (Billboard)	4

=== Year-end charts ===
2024 year-end chart performance for A Great Chaos
Chart (2024)	Position
US Billboard 200	134
US Top R&B/Hip-Hop Albums (Billboard)	47

2025 year-end chart performance for A Great Chaos
Chart (2025)	Position
US Billboard 200	180
US Top R&B/Hip-Hop Albums (Billboard)	64

== Certifications ==
Certifications for A Great Chaos
Region	Certification	Certified units/sales
Canada (Music Canada)	Platinum	80,000^{‡}
New Zealand (RMNZ)	Gold	7,500^{‡}
Poland (ZPAV)	Gold	10,000^{‡}
United Kingdom (BPI)	Silver	60,000^{‡}
United States (RIAA)	Platinum	1,000,000^{‡} / 828,000
Summaries
Worldwide	—	1,300,000
^{‡} Sales+streaming figures based on certification alone.
