= Fighting My Demons =

2023 song by Ken Carson

Song by Ken Carson

from the album A Great Chaos
- Released: October 13, 2023
- Genre: Rage
- Length: 2:30
- Label: Opium; Interscope
- Songwriters: Kenyatta Frazier Jr.; Anton Martin Mendo; Bart van Hoewijk; Olle Elvis Zijstra; Tobias Dekker; Warren Hunter
- Producers: Bart How; Lvis; Outtatown; Starboy; Warren Hunter

Music video
- "Fighting My Demons" on YouTube

"Fighting My Demons" is a song by American rapper Ken Carson. It was released on October 13, 2023, from Carson's third studio album, A Great Chaos. It was collaboratively produced by Bart How, Lvis, Outtatown, Star Boy, and Warren Hunter. Star Boy's producer tag is used near the song's climax.

== Critical reception ==
Writing for HipHopDX, Will Gedron stated that on the track, "Carson is able to channel the most exciting cadences of his career into a maximalist, galactic swell". He also noted that "the rest of his verse alternates between straight-line raps and pagan chants, sometimes stopping for a half-second before moving onto the next line. It’s a microcosm of the way he builds out his flows on the whole record — delivered as if his nose hasn’t been clear for months". In 2025, Complex named it the fourth greatest rage song of all time.

== Music video ==
The Cole Bennett-directed music video was released on the Lyrical Lemonade YouTube channel. It features glitchy visuals of Ken Carson partying and rapping his own lyrics, and is described as "a montage of grainy, 3D footage – that resembles content shot on night-vision goggles".

== Usage in media ==
- The song was used in the video game NBA 2K25.

== Personnel ==
Credits and personnel adapted from Tidal.

Musicians

- Kenyatta Frazier Jr. – vocals
- Star Boy – production
- Outtatown – production
- Bart How – production
- Lvis – production
- Warren Hunter – production

Technical

- Colin Leonard – mastering
- Roark Bailey – mixing
- Corey Moon – recording

== Charts ==
Chart performance for "Fighting My Demons"
Chart (2023)	Peak position
New Zealand Hot Singles (RMNZ)	14
US Bubbling Under Hot 100 (Billboard)	2
US Hot R&B/Hip-Hop Songs (Billboard)	40

== Certifications ==
Region	Certification	Certified units/sales
United States (RIAA)	Platinum	1,000,000^{‡}
^{‡} Sales+streaming figures based on certification alone.
