= Jennifer's Body (Ken Carson song) =

2023 song by Ken Carson

Song by Ken Carson

from the album A Great Chaos
- Released: October 13, 2023
- Length: 2:38
- Label: Opium; Interscope
- Songwriters: Kenyatta Frazier Jr.; Kenneth Pannu; Ștefan Cișmigiu
- Producers: KP Beatz; Lucian

Music video
- "Jennifer's Body" on YouTube

"Jennifer's Body" is a song by American rapper Ken Carson, released on October 13, 2023 from his third studio album A Great Chaos. It was produced by KP Beatz and Lucian.

== Background ==
Ken Carson first teased the song in an Instagram Live session on May 31, 2023.

== Composition ==
The song features a "cybernetic" beat, which starts, stops and repeats the process as Ken Carson mutters "fuck". The profanity was originally missing from an early snippet preview of the song, but was added in later.

== Critical reception ==
Eric Young of Creative Culture regarded the song to be "a raging masterpiece of a song".

== Charts ==
Chart performance for "Jennifer's Body"
Chart (2023)	Peak position
New Zealand Hot Singles (RMNZ)	19
US Bubbling Under Hot 100 Singles (Billboard)	4
US Hot R&B/Hip-Hop Songs (Billboard)	43

== Certifications ==
Region	Certification	Certified units/sales
United States (RIAA)	Gold	500,000^{‡}
^{‡} Sales+streaming figures based on certification alone.
