= Pink Heartz =

Studio album by SoFaygo
- Released: November 11, 2022
- Genre: Hip-hop
- Length: 53:27
- Label: Cactus Jack
- Producers: Acqua; Bakkwoods; Bryant Troy; BryceUnknwn; Coldsummer; Crush; EY; Elias Knight; ForTheNight; Haan; Jenius; Josh O'Brien; Kre8ore; Lnk; London Cyr; Neri; Niketaz; Ninetyniiine; Pharrell; PHX; Prodlau; RT; Rafmade; Razor; Rio Leyva; Trgc; Y2tnb; Zetra; Zzz

SoFaygo chronology
Babyjack (2022)	Pink Heartz (2022)	Go+ (2023)

Pink Heartz is the debut studio album by American rapper SoFaygo. It was released on November 11, 2022, through Cactus Jack Records. The album features guest appearances from Ken Carson, Lil Uzi Vert, Don Toliver, Gunna, and DJ Khaled.

== Background ==
Pink Heartz was first teased by SoFaygo in May 2021 shortly after it was announced that he had signed to Travis Scott's Cactus Jack Records. He would occasionally share snippets and provide additional updates over the course of the year, and appeared on both Trippie Redd and labelmate Don Toliver’s albums in August and October 2021 respectively, further building anticipation for the release of his own project. He would release the single "Let's Lose Our Minds" on September 1, 2021, which did not end up being a part of the final album.

After several months with minimal updates and no releases, SoFaygo released the EP B4Pink on June 14, 2022 as a preview to the album, and on the same day he was revealed to be part of the 2022 XXL Freshman Class.

Pink Heartz is definitely dropping sooner than y'all think. It's a lot going on right now. So, it's just like, it's all about timing right now, you feel what I'm saying?

A preview for the SoFaygo: Up Next film would also release on Apple Music and YouTube. The lead single “Hell Yeah” featuring Ken Carson was featured in a commercial for Beats by Dre which debuted the same day, starring LeBron James and his son Bronny.

On November 7, 2022, 4 days before the release, SoFaygo performed the track “Fasho” from the album on Jimmy Kimmel Live!

== Track listing ==
Pink Heartz track listing
No.	Title	Writer(s)	Producer(s)	Length
1.	"Transparency"	Andre Burt Jr.; Colney Larinsanga; Johnfrancis Mbata	Haan; Zzz; Josh O'Brien; Bryant Troy; Lau	2:28
2.	"Out"	Burt	Jenius; Bakkwoods; Troy; London Cyr	3:01
3.	"Hell Yeah" (featuring Ken Carson)	Burt; Kenyatta Frazier Jr.	Trgc; Bakkwoods; BryceUnknwn; Y2tnb	2:48
4.	"Blitz V2"	Burt	Bakkwoods; BryceUnknwn; Y2tnb	3:41
5.	"Stay Awake" (featuring Lil Uzi Vert)	Burt; Symere Woods	Zetra; Bakkwoods; Rafmade	3:37
6.	"Me Too"	Burt	Acqua; Bakkwoods; London Cyr	3:17
7.	"Goin Back"	Burt	ForTheNight; EY; Elias Knight; Razor; London Cyr	3:30
8.	"Another One"	Burt	London Cyr; Acqua; Bakkwoods; Neri; Coldsummer	3:16
9.	"Slip" (featuring Don Toliver)	Burt; Caleb Toliver	Rio Leyva; Bakkwoods; Coldsummer	4:14
10.	"I’ll Say"	Burt	Bakkwoods; Coldsummer	3:36
11.	"Price"	Burt	PHX; Bakkwoods; Kre8ore	3:21
12.	"Fasho"	Burt	Bakkwoods; Lnk; Niketaz; Crush; Coldsummer	4:09
13.	"Took Off" (featuring Gunna and DJ Khaled)	Burt; Sergio Kitchens; Khaled Khaled	Pharrell Williams	4:36
14.	"Greed"	Burt	RT; Acqua; Bakkwoods	2:16
15.	"Marvelous"	Burt	Trgc; Bakkwoods; Ninetyniiine	2:48
16.	"Forever"	Burt	Zetra; Ninetyniiine	2:49
Total length:				53:27

== Charts ==
Chart (2022)	Peak position
US Heatseekers	4
