= More Chaos =

Studio album by Ken Carson
- Released: April 11, 2025
- Genres: Rage; trap
- Length: 49:25
- Labels: Opium; Interscope
- Producers: 5Star; 16yrold; Bart How; Bass; Clif Shayne; Conz; Cxsket; EinthisMF; Esko; F1lthy; Four3va; Free Nilo; Gab3; Ivvys; Kavi; KP Beatz; Legion; Lil 88; Lord Sideus; Lucian; Lukrative; Mayyzo; Noah Mejia; Mental; Evan Moitoso; Outtatown; Skai; Star Boy; Warpstr; Young Emphasis

Ken Carson chronology
A Great Chaos (2023)	More Chaos (2025)	Xperiment (2026)

More Chaos is the fourth studio album by American rapper Ken Carson. It was released on April 11, 2025, through Opium and Interscope Records. Carson recorded most of the album in 2024, whilst on his 'Chaos Tour' in support of his third album, A Great Chaos (2023), and completed it following additional recording sessions in Los Angeles, California in January 2025. The album was produced by F1lthy, Lil 88, Star Boy, and Outtatown, among others. The album's standard edition does not include any guest appearances, but the streaming bonus track, "Off the Meter", features Opium labelmates Playboi Carti and Destroy Lonely.

More Chaos is a rage and trap album that expands upon the style and production of A Great Chaos. Reviews were generally favorable, with music critics praising its energy but expressing ambivalence towards its monotonous nature and perceived lack of change. It earned 59,500 album-equivalent units in its first week to debut at number one on the US Billboard 200 chart, becoming Carson's first US number-one album. Carson was scheduled to embark on a headlining tour of North America in support of the album, the Lord of Chaos Tour, but cancelled it in favor of supporting Carti on his Antagonist Tour from October to December 2025.

== Background and recording ==
In October 2023, Ken Carson released his third studio album, A Great Chaos, through Opium and Interscope Records. It was his breakout album, debuting at number 11 on the US Billboard 200 chart and becoming certified platinum by the Recording Industry Association of America (RIAA). In November 2023, Carson began teasing More Chaos when he posted the word "more" on social media, leading fans to assume it would be the title to its deluxe version of A Great Chaos. Following the release of the deluxe edition in July 2024, Carson confirmed that More Chaos would be the title of his next album. Later that same month, he embarked on the Chaos Tour of North America and Europe in support of A Great Chaos, which continued until November 2024.

The production of More Chaos was handled by F1lthy, Lil 88, Star Boy, and Outtatown, among others. Carson had less time to record on the album compared to his previous ones. He recorded most of it throughout the Chaos Tour, in his tour bus. Carson said that he worked on songs "straight from the brain" instead of writing them and said they were based on his mood and whatever beat he had. The album was completed following additional recording sessions in Los Angeles. On January 13, 2025, the American Twitch streamer Kai Cenat revealed text messages from Carson stating that he was "wrapping [the] album up" and that More Chaos would release on April 11, Carson's birthday.

== Composition ==
=== Overview ===
More Chaos is a rage and trap album. Expanding upon the style and production of A Great Chaos, it features a digitized and loudly soft clipped sound, distorted basslines and 808 drums, varied synthesizers, and Auto-Tuned vocals and melodics. Several songs feature beat switches, such as those on the three-track run of "Blakk Rokkstar", "LiveLeak" and "Diamonds", whilst others end with fade outs. Jon Caramanica of The New York Times called the album's mood one of "agitated anxiety" on account of its dense and compacted production, particularly in its first half. According to Olivier Lafontant of Pitchfork, the aggression of its first half gives way to "bubblier textures and candied Auto-Tune" in its second. Paul Attard of Slant Magazine described Carson's flow as "half-slurred, half-mumbled" and highlighted his "signature snicker" of "Huh, huh, huh, huh, huh, huh".

Driven by a hedonist ethos, Carson's lyrics consist of flexes and taunts; Kyaan-Sian Williams of NME states that he spends the near-entirety of the album "bragging about being a Gen-Z trap cult-leader". Lafontant considered the album to be representing and affirming of Carson's, and by extension Opium's, standing and influence in rap music culture. Caramanica called Carson's outlook on More Chaos "pure id" and compared him to Travis Scott and Playboi Carti, the head of Opium. In an interview with Marvin, Carson said that compared to A Great Chaos, he was showing people how he "[has] everything", and that in the context of the album "chaos" referred to "[a] great disaster. Like, you know, not all fuck ups are bad fuck ups. It's about not really giving a fuck about what's wrong."

=== Songs ===
The opening track of More Chaos, "Lord of Chaos", sees Carson rap relentlessly over video game-esque synthesizers and distorted 808s. "Xposed" sees Carson deliver threats in a humorous tone and features "skittering synthesizers" reminiscent of those on the Young Jeezy album Let's Get It: Thug Motivation 101 (2005), according to Peter A. Berry of Stereogum. "Money Spread" features hard-hitting bass and vocalizations Lafontant likened to "a spaceship with a corrupted motherboard". Carson uses a "swagged-out cadence" on "Root of All Evil", and glitch-like, staccato flows on "K-Hole". On "Trap Jump", he threateningly brags atop "militaristic 808s and jagged synthesizers [mimicking] shrapnel", according to Williams. Berry described its lyrics as "humblebrags" centered around an anthemic hook. "Blakk Rokkstar" combines fast-paced synthesizers and hi-hats with "booming" bass. "LiveLeak" takes its name from the now-defunct video sharing site (infamous for its collection of gore and shock videos), and was deemed best representative of the "gore-galore ethos" of More Chaos by The Fader's Vivian Medithi. Carson described it as his "hype track". Backed by lo-fi synthesizers, snares and 808s, Carson spells out that he is a vampire and describes a woman whose first tattoo is a tramp stamp of him.

"Dismantled" sees Carson rap confidently over a machine-like, bass-driven beat. "200 Kash" features heavily distorted bass and "proverbial" lyrics, whilst "Down2Earth" sees Carson adopting a "wheezy, lean-dipped delivery", according to Williams. Lafontant likened the "hollow, lust-driven relationships" depicted in "Down2Earth" and "Kryptonite" to those on Carson's second album, X (2022). Williams highlighted the latter track and "Naked" for their "heroic" synthesizers. "Psycho" showcases influences of cloud rap whilst retaining a distorted bass sound. According to Berry, the song leans into more melodic elements compared to the rest of More Chaos; he compared it to "seeing a rainbow from a dungeon window". "Thx", the final track on the album's standard edition, sees Carson thank his family, friends, drugs and drug dealer whilst offering relationship advice over an upbeat instrumental. Caramanica viewed the song as one of the album's "flickers of warmth and self-doubt".

Digital versions of More Chaos add three bonus tracks to the main album, while streaming versions add four bonus tracks. "2000" features "rolling synthesizers", whilst "Ghoul" layers "horror-movie screams" over a "demonic beat", per Attard. "Off the Meter", featuring Carti and Opium labelmate Destroy Lonely, was added as a bonus track to streaming services an hour after its initial release and is the only track on any versions of More Chaos to feature guest appearances. It is a high-energy and melodic track with a synth-pop instrumental reminiscent of glitchcore. Carson lyrically raps about drugs such as ecstasy and promethazine on its chorus, with Carti and Lonely's verses sharing similar topics. Carti's vocal performance on the track was compared to Future by Attard and Williams; Lafontant imagined the song as Carti "[finding] a random .wav file from 2022 and just [throwing] a verse and some Swamp Izzo tags on it."

== Release and promotion ==
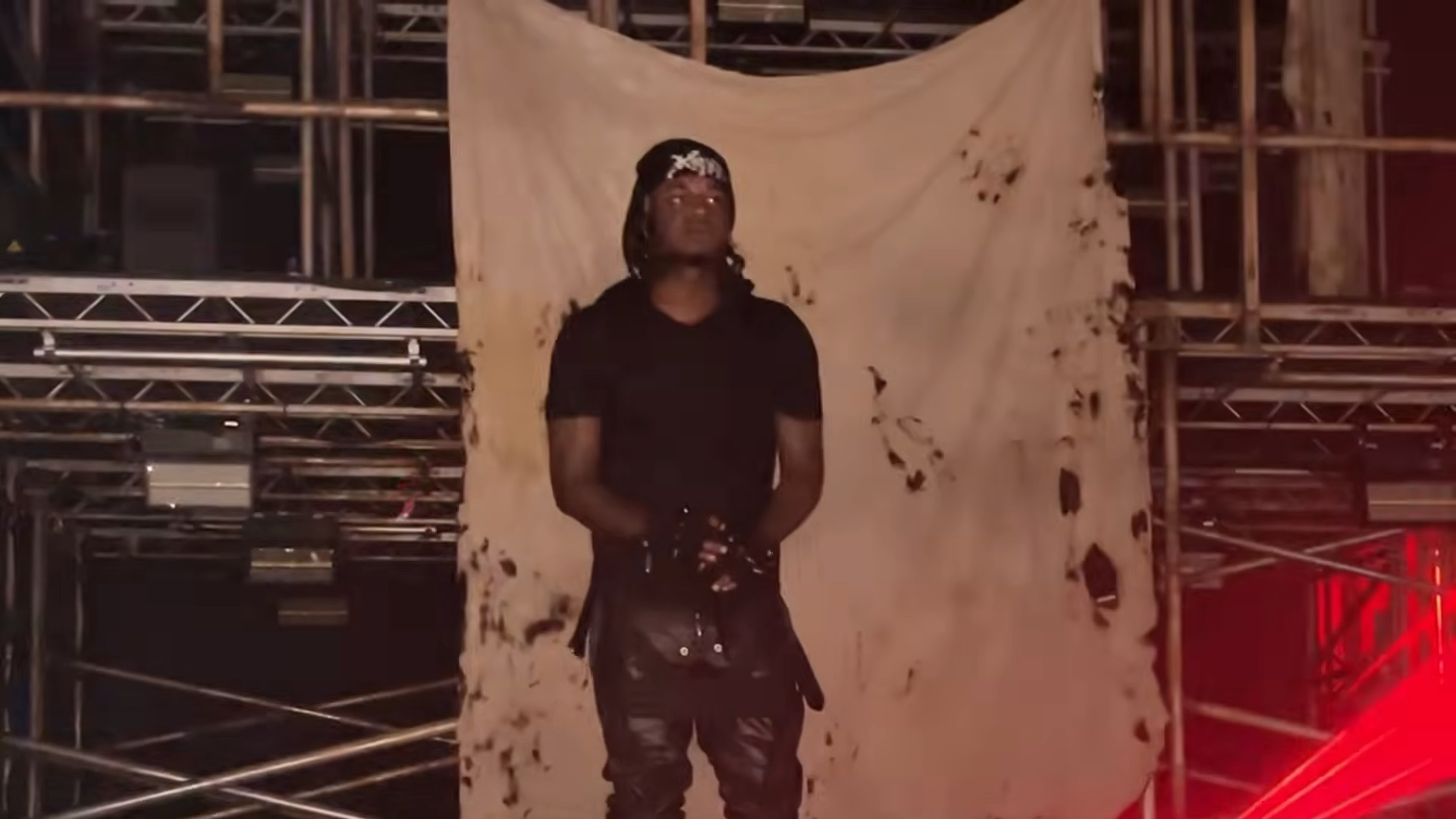
Ken Carson performing at the PSD Bank Dome on the WTF Tour in March 2026

Carson initially hinted at a Halloween 2024 release for More Chaos, which did not materialize. In a November 2024 interview with Pitchfork, it was revealed that More Chaos would be released in 2025. On April 4, 2025, Carson officially announced the album; pre-orders for CDs and vinyl were made available the next day. The album was released on April 11, 2025; a music video for "Money Spread", filmed whilst Carson was on tour, was released concurrently. A music video for "Lord of Chaos", directed by Nick Spiders, was released on April 15. That same day, Carson held an impromptu vinyl signing event at LUME Studios in New York City. On April 19, Carson debuted several More Chaos songs live at Barton Hall in Ithaca, New York. Carson was scheduled to embark on the Lord of Chaos Tour of North America in support of the album between July 29 to September 23, 2025. By July 24, the tour was reported to have been cancelled on social media, with no official statement being released. At the same time, rumors of a label-wide Opium tour with Playboi Carti began to surface, which would be confirmed when Carti announced the United States-only Antagonist Tour on August 25. Carson served as a supporting act, along with Destroy Lonely, Homixide Gang, and ApolloRed1, from October 3 to December 1, 2025. In March 2026, he embarked on the headlining WTF Tour of Europe.

Eddino Abdul Hadi of The Straits Times described the aesthetics of More Chaos as "gothic and cyberpunk" and considered it "on-brand for Opium". The album's cover, which depicts Carson in a bloodied shirt against a white background, was shot by Spiders in the span of 10 minutes using the same camera that was used for the cover of A Great Chaos. In an interview with The Fader, he said the cover "needed […] to be louder, crazier, bloodier" to match the fact it had "more chaos". A logo for the album title, which is modeled after death metal band Morbid Angel's logo, was created by Isaac Garza to promote the album; a belt buckle was crafted by Alex Moss to commemorate its release.

== Critical reception ==
Professional ratings
Aggregate scores
Source	Rating
Metacritic	71/100
Review scores
Source	Rating
AllMusic	4/5 stars
laut.de	3/5 stars
NME	3/5 stars
Pitchfork	7.0/10
Slant Magazine	3/5 stars

On review aggregator website Metacritic, More Chaos holds a score of 71 out of 100, based on reviews from five critics, which indicates "generally favorable reviews". Zachary Horvath of HotNewHipHop described the "energy" surrounding the album as "a little all over the place", with some viewing it as Carson's best and others being "on the complete opposite end of the spectrum."

NME's Williams praised Carson's energy and lyricism; she felt the album "took off" after its first five tracks, which she described as "fun, [...] but depending on your preference, you'll either love the stampede of flows or zone out until something shifts". Caramanica of The New York Times believed it functioned better as an album for live shows and festivals such as Rolling Loud than an "album qua album". He described its second half as more "lyrically vivid", though felt its beats' continued, "[relentless] pummel" negated the value of such details. Calling the growth between his albums "horizontal", Attard of Slant Magazine highlighted minor improvements in Carson's rapping ability but thought his flows and beats were repetitive and that he lacked charisma. Lafontant of Pitchfork called the album a "lateral move, not a step up", and felt Carson's performances were inconsistent. More favorably, a writer for AllMusic felt that the album was focused on presenting the "bigger picture" of its elements rather than on lyrics and flows and that its repetitive nature was part of its appeal, stating: "Ken Carson makes music to be overpowered by and to lose oneself in its sheer magnitude, and More Chaos accomplishes that once again." Yannik Gölz of laut.de felt that the album lacked depth and change and that Carson remained lackluster as a performer, but still had appeal with its production and visuals and "shows that the Rage formula is far from exhausted." (Note: Quotes are translated from the original text: "dass die Rage-Formel noch längst nicht verbraucht ist.")

Berry of Stereogum called More Chaos "strikingly monochromatic" in its sounds, lyrics and flows and compared Carson unfavorably to Carti and his recently released third album, Music (2025). Lafontant said that More Chaos lacked Music's "scathing unpredictability", which he felt the album "thrived" on despite its flaws and prevented it from becoming stale. Caramanica felt that Carson was "simply living in one of the lanes Carti chiseled out five years ago" and criticized his flows and lyrics as simplistic. Conversely, The Fader's Medithi deemed it "anachronistic" and believed it drew more from the music of Atlanta, as well as Future and Young Scooter, than other rage artists he felt were primarily inspired by Carti's second album, Whole Lotta Red (2020), such as OsamaSon and Prettifun. Gölz believed the album would appeal to those unimpressed with Carti's "attempt to become Atlanta's Travis Scott" on Music and would work better in live settings. (Note: Quotes are translated from the original text: "die bei Cartis "Music" eher genervt davon waren, dass er versucht hat, zu Atlantas Travis Scott zu werden")

On their year-end ranking, Complex ranked More Chaos at number 24 on its list of the 50 best albums of 2025.

== Commercial performance ==
More Chaos earned 59,500 album-equivalent units in its first week, 11,000 of which came from pure sales, to debut at number one on the US Billboard 200 chart. It was Carson's first US number-one album and the lowest-selling US number-one album since 2022, when Pusha T's fourth album, It's Almost Dry, topped the Billboard 200 with 55,000 album-equivalent units. In July 2026, Universal Music Group reported the album to have received more than 614 million global streams.

== Track listing ==
More Chaos – Standard edition track listing
No.	Title	Writer(s)	Producer(s)	Length
1.	"Lord of Chaos"	Kenyatta Frazier Jr.; Anton Mendo; Tobias Dekker	Star Boy; Outtatown	2:01
2.	"Xposed"	Frazier; Johnny Peng; Keifa Carter	Legion; Skai	3:50
3.	"Money Spread"	Frazier; Clifton Shayne; Pierre Thevenot; Stefan Cismigliu	Clif Shayne; Lucian; Lukrative	1:45
4.	"Root of All Evil"	Frazier; Mendo; Jerry Cruz; Sebastian Bink; Dekker	Star Boy; Outtatown; 16yrold; Bass	2:27
5.	"K-Hole"	Frazier; Cismigliu; Kenneth Pannu	KP; Lucian	3:18
6.	"Trap Jump"	Frazier; Evan Moitoso; Jalan Lowe	Lil 88; Moitoso	2:30
7.	"Blakk Rokkstar"	Frazier; Erik Cordova; Ethan Andrade; Michael Alberro; Richard Ortiz	F1lthy; Warpstr; EinthisMF; Young Emphasis	3:50
8.	"LiveLeak"	Frazier; Peng; Gabriel Rousseau; Kavian Salehi; Noah Mejia	Skai; Gab3; Mejia; Kavi	3:10
9.	"Diamonds"	Frazier; Cismigliu; Bart van Hoewijk; Jacob Williams; Mees van der Bruggen; Stacey Walroud; Oliver Brown; Frankie Azzaro	Lucian; Esko; Cxsket; Bart How; Icon; Mayyzo	3:49
10.	"Dismantled"	Frazier; Shayne; Cismigliu	Clif Shayne; Lucian	2:24
11.	"200 Kash"	Frazier; Kendale Williams; Connor Halstead	Four3va; Conz	1:44
12.	"Down2Earth"	Frazier; Cruz; Nicoló Castrichini	16yrold; Lord Sideus	2:02
13.	"Confetti"	Frazier; Cruz; Bink	16yrold; Bass	3:07
14.	"Naked"	Frazier; K. Williams; Linzell Newton; Numair Alam	Four3va; Mental; Ivvys	2:45
15.	"Kryptonite"	Frazier; Shayne	Clif Shayne	2:47
16.	"Psycho"	Frazier; Cruz; Eddie Elnaugh	16yrold; Free Nilo	2:18
17.	"Inferno"	Frazier; Ortiz; Rachad Hunter	5Star; F1lthy	2:36
18.	"Thx"	Frazier; Thevenot; Ortiz; Cismigliu	F1lthy; Lucian; Lukrative	2:52
Total length:				49:25

Digital/streaming release additional track listing
No.	Title	Writer(s)	Producer(s)	Length
19.	"2000"	Frazier; Ortiz; Samuel Greenberg; Andrew Hamilton	F1lthy; Sam Green; DrewCash	2:36
20.	"Evolution"	Frazier; K. Carter	Legion	3:13
21.	"Ghoul"	Frazier; Jordan Jenks	Pi'erre Bourne	2:49
Total length:				58:03

Streaming bonus track
No.	Title	Writer(s)	Producer(s)	Length
22.	"Off the Meter" (with Playboi Carti and Destroy Lonely)	Frazier; Jordan Carter; Bobby Sandimanie III; Mendo; Dekker; Rousseau; Corey Moon	Star Boy; Outtatown; Gab3; DJ Moon	3:40
Total length:				61:43

== Personnel ==
Credits adapted from Tidal.

- Benjamin Lidsky – recording engineer (1, 4–7, 9, 12–14, 17, 19–21), mixing engineer
- Corey Moon – recording engineer (2, 3, 8, 10, 11, 15, 16, 18)
- Colin Leonard – mastering

== Charts ==
=== Weekly charts ===
Weekly chart performance for More Chaos
Chart (2025)	Peak position
Australian Hip Hop/R&B Albums (ARIA)	29
Austrian Albums (Ö3 Austria)	9
Belgian Albums (Ultratop Flanders)	67
Belgian Albums (Ultratop Wallonia)	155
Canadian Albums (Billboard)	17
Dutch Albums (Album Top 100)	65
German Albums (Offizielle Top 100)	45
Hungarian Albums (MAHASZ)	17
Lithuanian Albums (AGATA)	37
New Zealand Albums (RMNZ)	26
Polish Albums (ZPAV)	56
Portuguese Albums (AFP)	64
Scottish Albums (Official Charts)	52
Swiss Albums (Schweizer Hitparade)	13
Swiss Hip-Hop Albums (Swiss Hitparade)	5
UK Albums (Official Charts)	54
UK R&B Albums (Official Charts)	3
US Billboard 200	1
US Top R&B/Hip-Hop Albums (Billboard)	1

=== Year-end charts ===
Year-end chart performance for More Chaos
Chart (2025)	Position
US Top R&B/Hip-Hop Albums (Billboard)	79

== See also ==
- List of Billboard 200 number-one albums of 2025
- 2025 in hip-hop
