= The Acronym =

2025 single by Ken Carson and Destroy Lonely

Single by Ken Carson and Destroy Lonely
- Released: December 12, 2025
- Genre: Hip-hop
- Length: 2:27
- Label: Opium; Interscope
- Songwriters: Kenyatta Lee Frazier Jr.; Bobby Wardell Sandimanie III; Corey Moon; Benjamin Shields; Hunter Brown
- Producers: DJ Moon; Sonickaboom; Akachi

Ken Carson singles chronology
"Margiela" (2025)	"The Acronym" (2025)

Destroy Lonely singles chronology
"Jumanji" (2025)	"The Acronym" (2025)	"Young" (2026)

Music video
- "The Acronym" on YouTube

"The Acronym" (stylized in lowercase) is a song by American rappers Ken Carson and Destroy Lonely. Released through Opium and Interscope Records on December 12, 2025, Carson and Lonely co-wrote the song with producers DJ Moon, Sonickaboom, and Akachi. Upon release, the track generated positive reviews from media critics, with the reviewers praising the duo's chemistry.

== Background ==
Upon the release of his tracks "Yes", "Catastrophe", and "Margiela", all released within weeks of each other. Carson began teasing the song in November with an acrostic of his label's name "Opium".

== Composition ==
"The Acronym" comes in at a run time of two minutes and 27 seconds long. Carson and Lonely co-wrote the song with DJ Moon, Sonickaboom, and Akachi. It was mixed by Benjamin Lidsky, and mastered by Colin Leonard and Rich Keller, where the latter handled the immersive mixing aspect of it. It is a hip-hop song that features "sinister horror keys" that immerse the listeners into Carson and Lonely's world. According to Quincy Dominic of Rating Games Music, he wrote how the track features "production is full of mayhem and layered with dynamic beats" that match the duo's frenetic flow. Lyrically, the track sees the two frequently flexing their wealth, influence, and streetwise confidence.

== Critical reception ==
Upon release, media critics praised the track, with writers praising the duo's chemistry. According to Jon Barlas of Complex, he labeled "The Acronym" as the duo's greatest collaboration, subsequently, it was labeled as Carson's 20 best songs with the track being ranked at number 10. Upon release, the song charted in multiple territories, with the song charting at number 15 on the NZ Hot 40 Singles chart, number six on the Billboard Bubbling Under Hot 100 chart, and number 23 on the Billboard Hot R&B/Hip-Hop Songs chart.

== Charts ==
Chart performance for "Overseas"
Chart (2024)	Peak position
New Zealand Hot Singles (RMNZ)	15
US Bubbling Under Hot 100 Singles (Billboard)	6
US Hot R&B/Hip-Hop Songs (Billboard)	23
