= X (Ken Carson album) =

- Standard cover (Note: The deluxe edition cover features the same image on a black background)

Studio album by Ken Carson
- Released: July 8, 2022
- Studios: Blue Room (Hollywood); The Cutting Room (New York City)
- Genre: Rage
- Length: 48:08
- Labels: Opium; Interscope
- Producers: Playboi Carti (exec.); 4vrlit; AM; Bart How; Dxrksiiide; Earl on the Beat; Esko; F1lthy; Gab3; Gl1tch; Jhux; Jonah Abraham; Lil 88; Loesoe; Lucian; Lukrative; Outtatown; Rok; Slowburnz; Ssort; Star Boy

Ken Carson chronology
| Project X (2021) | X (2022) | A Great Chaos (2023) |

Singles from X
- 1. "The End" Released: July 5, 2022

X is the second studio album by the American rapper Ken Carson, released on July 8, 2022, through Opium and Interscope Records. Carson's major-label debut, it was executive produced by Opium label head Playboi Carti and features guest appearances from labelmates Destroy Lonely and Homixide Gang. X is a rage album featuring high energy electronic production with synthesizers, 808 drums, and Auto-Tuned vocals. Its lead single, "The End", was released on July 5, 2022. A deluxe version containing five additional tracks, titled Xtended, was released on October 31.

X received mixed reviews from music critics, who criticized its repetitiveness and lack of creativity and identity. The album was Carson's first to enter the US Billboard 200 chart, debuting at number 115. The album track "Freestyle 2" became a fan favorite and one of Carson's most popular songs, and was certified Platinum by the Recording Industry Association of America (RIAA) in July 2026. Carson embarked on the X-Man Tour with Lonely in support of the album.

== Background and release ==
In July 2021, Ken Carson released his debut studio album, Project X, through Playboi Carti's Opium record label. The album received mixed reviews from critics but was popular with rage music fans and helped solidify Carson's place in the rap music scene. On June 27, 2022, Carson posted the cover artwork of his second album, X, on his Instagram page. On July 5, he announced the album and released its lead single, "The End". X was released through Opium and Interscope Records on July 8, 2022; it is Carson's major-label debut album. Following its release, Carson embarked on the X-Man Tour, supported by Opium labelmate Destroy Lonely. On October 31, 2022, a deluxe version of X containing five additional tracks, titled Xtended, was released concurrently with a music video for "MDMA". A music video for "Freestyle 2" was released on January 16, 2023.

X was executive produced by Carti and features production from F1lthy, Lil 88, and others. Lonely makes guest appearances on "MDMA" and "Murda Musik", whilst rap duo Homixide Gang, also signed to Opium, appear on "Delinquent". The majority of the album's songs were recorded at Blue Room Studio in Hollywood, though Carson usually worked on material in hotels or whilst travelling. He first selected a beat before going into the recording booth, where he would sometimes stay for three or four hours. Carson finished the album at The Cutting Room Studios in New York City, where he recorded "Freestyle 1".

== Composition ==
X is a rage album featuring high-energy electronic production with synthesizers, 808 drums, and Auto-Tuned vocals. A writer for AllMusic described it as presenting a more "stark and aggressive" take on the production of Project X and highlighted its Carti-esque "dark psychedelia". Anthony Malone of HipHopDX and Alphonse Pierre of Pitchfork both considered the album to be reminiscent of Carti's second album, Whole Lotta Red (2020), with the former viewing it as a "bizzaro" recreation of its "cathartic mayhem". In a 2022 interview with Complex, Carson said that he wanted to make a rap album representative of his live shows, and similar to his songs "Hella" and "Clutch". In a 2023 interview with Vibe, he stated of the album's title: "It's just like a fill-in-the-blank. Like, instead of putting the space bar, just put an X. That actually makes it mean something."

The opening track of X, "Intro", sees Carson embrace a "harder" rapping style that Pierre likened to Yeat's 2022 album 2 Alive. "New" details the scope of Carson's new lifestyle atop "glitchy" synthesizers and pounding bass lines, whilst "Nobody" is dominated by "thrashing" synthesizers and 808s. "Go" features "exciting bleeps" and high-energy raps from Carson, who brags about his jewelry, women, and money. Slant Magazine's Paul Attard described Carson's verse on the "hyperactive" song "MDMA" as "a giant middle finger […] similar in tone" to X's cover artwork. On "PDBMH", Carson lists off various drugs with a sped-up, Auto-Tuned flow that Pierre considered "slightly" reminiscent of Young Thug. "Money Hunt" was described as one of X's "moments of fun" by Malone. "South Beach" combines Carson's laid-back delivery with "disorienting" synthesizers, as described by Pierre. "Going Schitz" is a vulgar track in which Carson begins by bragging about how he "fucked the fuck out that bitch". According to Attard, "Freestyle 2" sees Carson confidently "[stutter] out a slur of half-formed adlibs" over a massive beat. "Fuk 12" expresses an anti-police sentiment, whilst "Get Rich or Die" features "energetic flexing" and a pitch change at its end. Malone highlighted the final track on X, "The End", for Carson's Auto-Tune-less singing and the absence of his "Teen X gimmick", which he felt "[showed] a heart that beats through the lean and other substances." Carson called it "super mellow".

== Critical reception ==
Professional ratings
Review scores
| Source | Rating |
|---|---|
| AllMusic | 2/5 stars |
| HipHopDX | 2.8/5 |
| The Needle Drop | 0/10 |
| Pitchfork | 4.7/10 |

X received mixed reviews from critics. Pierre of Pitchfork said that "Carson lacks the curiosity, imagination, and irreverence to do anything more than lay down the same glazed Auto-Tune raps, with only rare attempts to liven them up", and that overall the album was "forgettable". A writer for AllMusic said that, "This repetitive production taken in tandem with Carson's often listless and uninspired lyricism (and flows that sometimes struggle to even stay on beat) makes X a largely hollow and forgettable affair." Malone of HipHopDX was similarly critical of the album's repetitive nature and Carson's lack of identity, feeling that he was too reliant on Auto-Tune and production and that Destroy Lonely and Homixide Gang overshadowed him on their featured tracks. More favorably, Slant Magazine's Attard stated that whilst Carson came across as "deeply unlikeable" and narcissistic throughout the album, his "bratty energy" was "downright thrilling" at times. Alexander Cole of HotNewHipHop viewed it as "solid" and highlighted its songwriting improvements.

Slant Magazine listed X as one of the best hip-hop albums of 2022, whilst HipHopDX listed it as one of the year's most disappointing albums; the latter claimed that the album led some fans of rage and plugg music to "question if the man instrumental in inspiring Playboi Carti's sound on Whole Lotta Red was a false prophet." According to Lavender Alexandria of HotNewHipHop, Carson was the subject of backlash following its release and led to him being dismissed as a "Playboi Carti rip-off". Carson said he was not influenced by the reception of X when making his third album A Great Chaos (2023), as he "[does not] make [his] music for critics". In 2023, John Norris of VMan said that "Freestyle 2" is "considered by many to be [Carson's] finest track to date"; Carson also called it his defining track in an interview with Genius that year.

== Commercial performance ==
X was Carson's first album to chart on the US Billboard 200, debuting at number 115. It also reached number 50 on Billboard's Top R&B/Hip-Hop Albums chart. "Freestyle 2" became a fan favorite and one of Carson's most popular songs. In September 2022, it became the subject of a TikTok trend involving users performing a three-step dance to its opening verse; more than 70,000 videos were made with the song, including one by Rico Nasty. On July 22, 2026, the song was certified Platinum by the Recording Industry Association of America (RIAA).

== Track listing ==
Credits adapted from liner notes. Xtended credits adapted from Apple Music and Tidal.

X track listing
| No. | Title | Writer(s) | Producer(s) | Length |
|---|---|---|---|---|
| 1. | "Intro" | Kenyatta Frazier Jr.; Joel Huckle; Nicholas Santos | Jhux; Slowburnz | 3:15 |
| 2. | "New" | Frazier; Gabriel Rousseau | Gab3 | 2:49 |
| 3. | "Gems" | Frazier; Rousseau; Gl1tch | Gab3; Gl1tch | 2:16 |
| 4. | "Nobody" | Frazier; Rousseau | Gab3 | 2:10 |
| 5. | "Go" | Frazier; Tobias Dekker; Anton Mendo; Dxrksiiide | Outtatown; Star Boy; Dxrksiiide | 1:50 |
| 6. | "MDMA" (featuring Destroy Lonely) | Frazier; Bobby Sandimanie III; Arman Andican; Bart van Hoewijk; Dekker; Mendo | AM; Bart How; Outtatown; Star Boy | 3:48 |
| 7. | "X" | Frazier; Pierre Thevenot; Ștefan Cișmigliu; Thomas Ross | Lukrative; Lucian; Ssort | 2:09 |
| 8. | "PDBMH" | Frazier; van Hoewijk | Bart How | 2:18 |
| 9. | "Money Hunt" | Frazier; Jalan Lowe; Dekker; Mendo | Lil 88; Outtatown; Star Boy | 1:45 |
| 10. | "South Beach" | Frazier; Dekker; Mendo | Outtatown; Star Boy | 2:00 |
| 11. | "Going Schitz" | Frazier; van Hoewijk; Cas van der Heijden | Bart How; Loesoe | 1:55 |
| 12. | "Same Thing" | Frazier; van der Heijden | Loesoe | 1:55 |
| 13. | "Freestyle 1" | Frazier; Cișmigiu; Ross; Thevenot | Lucian; Ssort; Lukrative | 3:51 |
| 14. | "Freestyle 2" | Frazier; Andican; Richard Ortiz; Rousseau | AM; F1lthy; Gab3 | 2:18 |
| 15. | "Fuk 12" | Frazier; Mendo; Dekker; van Hoewijk | Outtatown; Star Boy; Bart How | 1:24 |
| 16. | "Murda Musik" (featuring Destroy Lonely) | Frazier; Sandimanie; van Hoewijk; Rok Curkovic; 4vrlit | Rok; Bart How; 4vrlit | 2:56 |
| 17. | "Delinquent" (featuring Homixide Gang) | Frazier; Demetrius Chatman; Keyon Thomas; Ortiz; Thevenot; Oliver Brown | F1lthy; Lukrative; Esko | 2:45 |
| 18. | "Get Rich or Die" | Frazier; Dekker; Mendo | Outtatown; Star Boy | 2:19 |
| 19. | "Turn Up" | Frazier; Dekker; Mendo | Outtatown; Star Boy | 1:58 |
| 20. | "The End" | Frazier; Dekker; Mendo | Outtatown; Star Boy | 2:15 |
| Total length: | | | | 48:08 |

Xtended (deluxe edition) track listing
| No. | Title | Writer(s) | Producer(s) | Length |
|---|---|---|---|---|
| 21. | "Freestyle 3" | Frazier; van Hoewijk | Bart How | 2:22 |
| 22. | "Fashion Habits" | Frazier; Isaac Bynum | Earl on the Beat | 3:22 |
| 23. | "Shoot" | Frazier; Ross; Thevenot | Ssort; Lukrative | 2:47 |
| 24. | "Swag Overload" | Frazier; Cișmigliu; Jonah Abraham | Lucian; Abraham | 2:32 |
| 25. | "Lookbook" | Frazier; Thevenot; Cișmigliu | Lukrative; Lucian | 2:30 |
| Total length: | | | | 61:35 |

Notes
- "PDBMH" is an initialism for "Please Don't Blow My High"
Additional credits
- Benjamin Lidsky - engineering
- Roark Bailey - mixing
- Colin Leonard - mastering

== Charts ==
Chart performance for X
| Chart (2022–23) | Peak position |
|---|---|
| US Billboard 200 | 115 |
| US Heatseekers Albums (Billboard) | 1 |
| US Top R&B/Hip-Hop Albums (Billboard) | 50 |
