= Ken Carson =

American rapper (born 2000)

- Carson in 2026

Background information
- Also known as: Teen X; X Man; Ken Car$on; Lord of Chaos
- Born: Kenyatta Lee Bettis Frazier Jr. April 11, 2000 (age 26); Atlanta, Georgia, U.S.
- Genres: Southern hip-hop; trap; rage
- Occupations: Rapper; singer; songwriter; record producer
- Works: Discography
- Years active: 2015–present
- Labels: Opium; Interscope
- Formerly of: 808 Mafia
- Website: kencarson.xyz

Kenyatta Lee Bettis Frazier Jr. (born April 11, 2000), known professionally as Ken Carson, is an American rapper and record producer from Atlanta, Georgia. Carson initially gained attention for his SoundCloud releases and collaborations with fellow Atlanta rapper Destroy Lonely. In 2019, Carson signed with Playboi Carti's record label Opium, an imprint of Interscope Records, to release his debut studio album, Project X (2021).

His second album, X (2022), entered the Billboard 200 amidst negative critical reception. His third studio album, A Great Chaos (2023), peaked at number 11 on the chart and saw a critical incline; its deluxe release spawned his first Billboard Hot 100 entry with the single "Overseas". Carson's fourth album, More Chaos (2025), became his first to debut atop the Billboard 200.

Carson is associated with Opium label-mates Destroy Lonely and Homixide Gang.

== Career ==
=== 2015–2019: Beginnings ===
Carson initially joined 808 Mafia in 2015 as a rapper after meeting fellow record producer TM88, and began releasing music on SoundCloud in 2017. After gaining popularity in the underground rap scene, he was discovered by fellow Atlanta rapper Playboi Carti and signed to his label Opium in 2019. Carson was also the first to be signed to Opium out of Destroy Lonely and Homixide Gang.

=== 2020–2022: Teen X, Project X and X ===
After signing with Opium in 2019, Carson released two extended plays—Boy Barbie and Teen X—the following year.

At the start of 2021, he released his third EP, titled Teen X: Relapsed, before releasing his debut studio album, Project X, later that year. In February 2022, he appeared as a guest on the track "Gëek high" off American rapper Yeat's second studio album 2 Alive. He released his second studio album, X, on July 8, 2022. It peaked at number 115 on the Billboard 200 and reached number 50 on Billboard's Top R&B/Hip-Hop Albums chart.

In October 2022, he and fellow Atlanta rapper SoFaygo released a single titled "Hell Yeah" for SoFaygo's debut studio album, Pink Heartz, with an accompanying music video. On October 31, 2022, Ken Carson released a deluxe version of his X album, titled Xtended, alongside a music video on YouTube for his song "MDMA" featuring Destroy Lonely. On January 16, 2023, a music video for "Freestyle 2" was released. On June 13, 2024, the song was certified Gold by the Recording Industry Association of America (RIAA).

=== 2023–2025: A Great Chaos and More Chaos ===
Carson released the single "I Need U" on February 14, 2023. On May 5, 2023, Carson featured on his Opium labelmate Destroy Lonely's debut studio album, If Looks Could Kill, on the song "Money & Sex." In June 2023, Carson produced the song "x2" from Lil Uzi Vert's third studio album, Pink Tape. On October 6, 2023, Carson tweeted a pre-save link for his third studio album, A Great Chaos, indicating that the project would be released on October 13 with a tracklist of 18 songs; three days later, nearly the entire album leaked online after several tracks were shared on a Discord server. On October 12, an album launch party was held at the Silo dance club in Brooklyn to commemorate the album's release. Carson performed the tracks "Fighting My Demons," "Lose It," "Hardcore," "Singapore," and "Paranoid" alongside Destroy Lonely, before bringing out fellow rapper and Opium founder Playboi Carti to perform songs from the rapper's latest album, "Stop Breathing" from Whole Lotta Red (2020), and "Fein" from Travis Scott's fourth studio album, Utopia (2023).

On July 5, 2024, he released the deluxe edition of A Great Chaos, containing seven additional tracks, including the single "Overseas," which was released on April 12, 2024. The single became his first entry on the Billboard Hot 100, debuting at number 79. On November 1, 2024, Carson released the single "Delusional" in promotion of his fourth studio album More Chaos. The single debuted at number 49 on the US Hot R&B/Hip-Hop Songs. He would eventually release the album on his twenty-fifth birthday, April 11, 2025, and became his first album to reach the number 1 spot on the Billboard 200 and the Top R&B/Hip-Hop Albums, earning 59,500 album-equivalent units in its first week.

On Halloween, October 31, 2025, Carson released his single, "Yes"., six days later, on November 6, Carson would follow through with his next single, titled "Catastrophe". On November 13, Carson would release "Margiela". On November 17, Carson was featured in a Skims ad, where the brand was doing a collaboration with Cactus Plant Flea Market. On December 12, he released "The Acronym" featuring Destroy Lonely after having previewed it the month before.

=== 2026–present: Xperiment, Cartunez, & 00Twinz ===
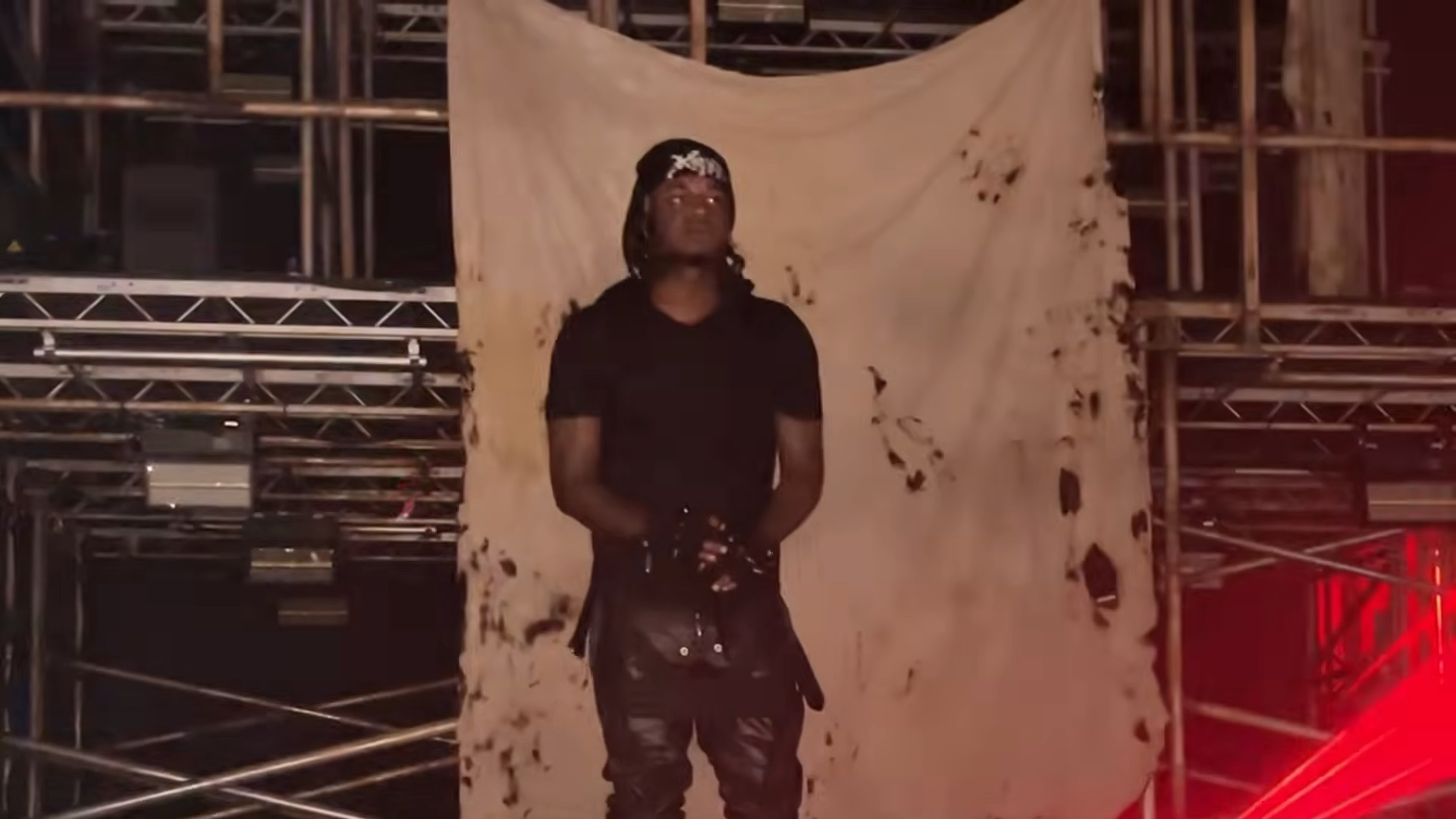
Carson performing live in Düsseldorf in March 2026

On May 10, 2026, Carson made his headliner debut for Rolling Loud 2026 in Orlando, Florida, after American rapper YoungBoy Never Broke Again was unable to attend. He was also set to headline at Rolling Loud Australia before the festival got cancelled. On June 19, 2026, Carson announced his fifth album, Xperiment, which was released through the Opium record label on July 3, 2026. On June 28, 2026, Carson announced that another project titled Cartunez would release on July 10, 2026, just one week after Xperiment. Cartunez did not end up releasing and the official cover was revealed in the morning of July 10. Cartunez released on August 26, 2026 as a reissue of Xperiment.

On July 4, 2026, Carson then announced a collaborative album titled 00Twinz with Destroy Lonely to be released on October 30, 2026.

Following three European festival performances from July to August, the Xperimenting Tour (comprising fourteen concerts across the United States) is planned to take place from August 26 to September 23; DJ Moon, Prettifun, and Xaviersobased are the planned opening acts. A special solo performance at ComplexCon 2026 on October 3 is also billed under the tour name.

Carson made an appearance on the Re-Rank series, where he discussed his interest in professional wrestling and named John Cena as one of his inspirations.

== Musical style ==
Carson's musical style was described by HotNewHipHop music critic Alexander Cole as "having electronic production that is energetic in nature" and having focused "flows." Mano Sundaresan of Pitchfork compared Carson to his mentor Playboi Carti, especially his 2020 album Whole Lotta Red, as well as to Lil Uzi Vert for his flow and mentality.

== Personal life ==
Ken Carson was born as Kenyatta Lee Frazier Jr. on April 11, 2000, in Atlanta, Georgia. Most would simply refer to him as Ken instead of Kenyatta growing up. His stage name was derived from the doll from the Barbie franchise of the same name, this is referenced in the title of his first EP, Boy Barbie.

Carson is an avid fan of viewing online gore videos (such as beheading videos). Carson is also a fan of slamming brutal death metal and grindcore bands, such as Waking the Cadaver, Torsofuck and Waco Jesus, the latter two of which he sported t-shirts of as he performed at two separate editions of Rolling Loud.

== Discography ==
=== Studio albums ===
- Project X (2021)
- X (2022)
- A Great Chaos (2023)
- More Chaos (2025)
- Xperiment (2026)

=== Collaborative albums ===
- 00Twinz (with Destroy Lonely) (2026)

== Tours ==
=== Headlining ===
- The X Man Tour (2022)
- Chaos Tour (2024)
- WTF Tour (2026)
- Xperimenting Tour (2026)

=== Supporting ===
- Playboi Carti – Antagonist Tour (2025)

== Awards and nominations ==
Award Ceremony	Year	Work	Category	Result
Berlin Music Video Awards	2023	Rock n' Roll	Best Editor	Nominated
