= Interscope Records discography =

The following is a list of music released by Interscope Records.

== 1990s ==
=== 1991 ===
- 2Pac – 2Pacalypse Now
- Gerardo – Mo' Ritmo
- Marky Mark and the Funky Bunch – Music for the People
- Primus – Sailing the Seas of Cheese
- The Storm – The Storm
- Various artists – Bill & Ted's Bogus Journey Soundtrack

=== 1992 ===
- 4 Non Blondes – Bigger, Better, Faster, More!
- Bad4Good – Refugee
- Dr. Dre – The Chronic (Death Row/Priority)
- Gerardo – Dos
- Helmet – Meantime
- Marky Mark and the Funky Bunch – You Gotta Believe (Atlantic)
- Nine Inch Nails – Broken (Nothing/TVT)
- Nine Inch Nails – Fixed (Nothing/TVT)
- No Doubt – No Doubt
- Primus – Miscellaneous Debris (Atlantic)
- Unruly Child – Unruly Child

=== 1993 ===
- 2Pac – Strictly 4 My N.I.G.G.A.Z... (TNT)
- Akinyele – Vagina Diner
- Primus – Pork Soda (Prawn Song)
- Snoop Doggy Dogg – Doggystyle (Death Row)

=== 1994 ===
- Blackstreet – Blackstreet (Atlantic)
- Bush – Sixteen Stone (Trauma)
- Cop Shoot Cop – Release
- Drive Like Jehu – Yank Crime
- Helmet – Betty
- Marilyn Manson – Get Your Gunn (Nothing)
- Marilyn Manson – Portrait of an American Family (Nothing)
- Nine Inch Nails – March of the Pigs (Nothing)
- Nine Inch Nails – The Downward Spiral (Nothing)
- Nine Inch Nails – Closer (Nothing)
- Toadies – Rubberneck
- Thug Life – Thug Life, Volume I
- Various artists – Above the Rim (Death Row)
- Various artists – Murder Was the Case (Death Row)
- Various artists – Natural Born Killers (soundtrack) (Nothing)
- Various artists – The Crow: Original Motion Picture Soundtrack (Nothing)

=== 1995 ===
- 2Pac – Me Against the World
- All – Pummel
- Deep Blue Something – Home
- Dish – Boneyard Beach
- Tha Dogg Pound – Dogg Food (Death Row/Priority)
- Marilyn Manson – "Lunchbox" (Nothing)
- Marilyn Manson – Smells Like Children (Nothing)
- Nine Inch Nails – Further Down the Spiral (Nothing)
- No Doubt – Tragic Kingdom (Trauma)
- Primus – Tales from the Punchbowl (Prawn Song)
- Pure Soul – Pure Soul
- Various artists – Showgirls soundtrack

=== 1996 ===
- 2Pac – All Eyez on Me (Death Row)
- 2Pac (as Makaveli) – The Don Killuminati: The 7 Day Theory (Death Row)
- Blackstreet – Another Level
- Bush – Razorblade Suitcase (Trauma)
- Dr. Dre – Dr. Dre Presents the Aftermath (Aftermath)
- Lifter – Melinda (Everything Was Beautiful and Nothing Hurt)
- Marilyn Manson – The Beautiful People (Nothing)
- Marilyn Manson – Antichrist Superstar (Nothing)
- Nine Inch Nails – Quake (soundtrack) (Id Software)
- Snoop Doggy Dogg – Tha Doggfather (Death Row)
- Various artists – Christmas on Death Row (Death Row)
- Various artists – Death Row Greatest Hits (Death Row/Priority)

=== 1997 ===
- 2Pac – R U Still Down? (Remember Me) (Amaru/Jive)
- Artificial Joy Club – Melt
- Bush – Deconstructed (Trauma)
- Helmet – Aftertaste
- Jurassic 5 – Jurassic 5 (EP) (Rumble Records)
- The Lady of Rage – Necessary Roughness (Death Row)
- Limp Bizkit – Three Dollar Bill, Y'all (Flip)
- Marilyn Manson – Tourniquet (Nothing)
- Marilyn Manson – Remix & Repent (Nothing)
- Nine Inch Nails – The Perfect Drug (Nothing)
- Primus – Brown Album (Prawn Song)
- Smash Mouth – Fush Yu Mang
- The Firm – The Album (Aftermath)
- The Whispers – Songbook Volume 1: The Songs of Babyface
- Transister – Transister
- Various artists – Gridlock'd (Death Row)
- Various artists – Lost Highway (soundtrack) (Nothing)

=== 1998 ===
- 2Pac – Greatest Hits (Amaru/Death Row)
- Black Eyed Peas – Behind the Front (will.i.am Music Group)
- Deep Blue Something – Byzantium
- Marilyn Manson – The Dope Show (Nothing)
- Marilyn Manson – Mechanical Animals (Nothing)
- Mya – Mya
- Primus – Rhinoplasty (Prawn Song)
- Various artists – Bulworth: The Soundtrack

=== 1999 ===
- 2Pac & Outlawz – Still I Rise (Death Row)
- Blackstreet – Finally
- Bush – The Science of Things (Trauma)
- Dr. Dre – 2001 (Aftermath)
- Eminem – The Slim Shady LP (Aftermath)
- Enrique Iglesias – Enrique
- Eve – Let There Be Eve...Ruff Ryders' First Lady (Ruff Ryders)
- Jordan Knight – Jordan Knight
- Limp Bizkit – Significant Other (Flip)
- Marilyn Manson – I Don't Like the Drugs (But the Drugs Like Me) (Nothing)
- Marilyn Manson – Rock Is Dead (Nothing)
- Marilyn Manson – The Last Tour on Earth (Nothing)
- Nine Inch Nails – The Day the World Went Away (Nothing)
- Nine Inch Nails – The Fragile (Nothing)
- Nine Inch Nails – We're In This Together (Nothing)
- Primus – Antipop (Prawn Song)
- Ruff Ryders – Ryde or Die Vol. 1 (Ruff Ryders)
- Smash Mouth – Astro Lounge
- Sway & King Tech – This or That
- Various artists – Office Space
- Various artists – Wild Wild West: Music Inspired by the Motion Picture (Overbrook)

== 2000s ==
=== 2000 ===
- 2Pac – The Rose That Grew from Concrete (Amaru)
- Black Eyed Peas – Bridging the Gap (will.i.am Music Group)
- D12 – Detroit, What? (Snippet Tape) (Shady)
- Drag-On – Opposite of H2O (Ruff Ryders)
- Eminem – The Marshall Mathers LP (Aftermath)
- Jurassic 5 – Quality Control
- Limp Bizkit – Chocolate Starfish and the Hot Dog Flavored Water
- The LOX – We Are the Streets (Ruff Ryders)
- Marilyn Manson – Holy Wood (In the Shadow of the Valley of Death) (Nothing)
- Nine Inch Nails – Things Falling Apart (Nothing)
- Mya – Fear of Flying
- No Doubt – Return of Saturn
- Queens of the Stone Age – Rated R
- Ruff Ryders – Ryde or Die Vol. 2 (Ruff Ryders)
- U2 – All That You Can't Leave Behind (Island)

=== 2001 ===
- 2Pac – Until the End of Time (Amaru/Death Row)
- Bubba Sparxxx – Dark Days, Bright Nights
- D12 – Devil's Night (Shady)
- Enrique Iglesias – Escape
- Eve – Scorpion (Ruff Ryders)
- Jadakiss – Kiss tha Game Goodbye (Ruff Ryders)
- Limp Bizkit – New Old Songs
- No Doubt – Rock Steady
- Ruff Ryders – Ryde or Die Vol. 3: In the "R" We Trust (Ruff Ryders)
- Smash Mouth – Smash Mouth
- Toadies – Hell Below/Stars Above
- Various artists – Ali soundtrack
- Various artists – The Wash (soundtrack) (Aftermath/Doggy Style)

=== 2002 ===
- 2Pac – Better Dayz (Amaru/Tha Row)
- ...And You Will Know Us by the Trail of Dead – Source Tags & Codes
- Audioslave – Audioslave (Epic)
- Eminem – The Eminem Show (Shady/Aftermath)
- Jurassic 5 – Power in Numbers
- Nine Inch Nails – And All That Could Have Been (Nothing)
- Queens of the Stone Age – Songs for the Deaf
- Styles P – A Gangster and a Gentleman (Ruff Ryders)
- Truth Hurts – Truthfully Speaking (Aftermath)
- t.A.T.u. – 200 km/h in the Wrong Lane (Universal)
- Various artists – 8 Mile: Music from and Inspired by the Motion Picture (Shady)

=== 2003 ===
- 50 Cent – Get Rich or Die Tryin' (Shady/Aftermath)
- Black Eyed Peas – Elephunk (will.i.am Music Group/A&M)
- Bubba Sparxxx – Deliverance
- Campfire Girls – Tell Them Hi
- Enrique Iglesias – 7
- G-Unit – Beg for Mercy (G-Unit)
- Limp Bizkit – Results May Vary
- Obie Trice – Cheers (Shady)
- Marilyn Manson – The Golden Age of Grotesque (Nothing)
- Mya – Moodring (A&M)
- Smash Mouth – Get the Picture?

=== 2004 ===
- 2Pac – Loyal to the Game (Amaru)
- D12 – D12 World (Shady/Interscope)
- Eminem – Encore (Shady/Aftermath)
- Helmet – Size Matters
- Jadakiss – Kiss of Death (Ruff Ryders)
- Jimmy Eat World – Futures (Tiny Evil)
- Lloyd Banks – The Hunger for More (G-Unit)
- Marilyn Manson – Lest We Forget: The Best of (Nothing)
- Queens of the Stone Age – Stone Age Complication
- Gwen Stefani – Love. Angel. Music. Baby.
- U2 – How to Dismantle an Atomic Bomb
- Young Buck – Straight Outta Cashville (G-Unit)

=== 2005 ===
- 50 Cent – The Massacre (Shady/Aftermath)
- 50 Cent – The Massacre (Special Edition) (Shady/Aftermath)
- Audioslave – Out of Exile (Epic)
- Black Eyed Peas – Monkey Business (will.i.am Music Group/A&M)
- Daddy Yankee – Barrio Fino en Directo (El Cartel)
- Eminem – Curtain Call: The Hits (Shady/Aftermath)
- The Game – The Documentary (Aftermath/G-Unit)
- G-Unit Records – Get Rich or Die Tryin': Music from and Inspired by the Motion Picture (G-Unit)
- M.I.A. – Arular (XL)
- Nine Inch Nails – The Hand that Feeds (Nothing)
- Nine Inch Nails – With Teeth (Nothing)
- Nine Inch Nails – Only (Nothing)
- Queens of the Stone Age – Lullabies to Paralyze
- Will Smith – Lost and Found (Overbrook)
- t.A.T.u. – Dangerous and Moving (Universal)
- Tony Yayo – Thoughts of a Predicate Felon (G-Unit)

=== 2006 ===
- +44 – When Your Heart Stops Beating
- 2Pac – Pac's Life (Amaru)
- Audioslave – Revelations (Epic)
- Black Eyed Peas – Renegotiations: The Remixes (will.i.am Music Group/A&M)
- Brand New – The Devil and God Are Raging Inside Me (Tiny Evil)
- Busta Rhymes – The Big Bang (Flipmode/Aftermath)
- Fergie – The Dutchess (will.i.am Music Group/A&M)
- Jibbs – Jibbs Featuring Jibbs (Geffen)
- Jurassic 5 – Feedback
- Lloyd Banks – Rotten Apple (G-Unit)
- Mobb Deep – Blood Money (G-Unit)
- Nine Inch Nails – Every Day Is Exactly the Same (Nothing)
- Obie Trice – Second Round's on Me (Shady)
- Pharrell – In My Mind (Star Trak)
- Gwen Stefani – The Sweet Escape
- Styles P – Time Is Money (Ruff Ryders)
- Robin Thicke – The Evolution of Robin Thicke (Star Trak)
- Various artists – Eminem Presents: The Re-Up (Shady)

=== 2007 ===
- 2Pac – Best of 2Pac (Amaru/Death Row)
- 50 Cent – Curtis (Shady/Aftermath)
- Bone Thugs-n-Harmony – Strength & Loyalty (Full Surface)
- Cashis – The County Hound EP (Shady)
- Daddy Yankee – El Cartel: The Big Boss (El Cartel)
- Enrique Iglesias – Insomniac
- M.I.A. – Kala (XL)
- Marilyn Manson – Eat Me, Drink Me
- Nine Inch Nails – Year Zero
- Nine Inch Nails – Year Zero Remixed
- OneRepublic – Dreaming Out Loud (Mosley Music Group)
- Queens of the Stone Age – Era Vulgaris
- Rich Boy – Rich Boy (Zone 4)
- Soulja Boy Tell 'Em – souljaboytellem.com (Stacks On Deck Ent./HHH/Collipark)
- Timbaland – Shock Value (Blackground/Mosley Music Group)
- will.i.am – Songs About Girls
- Young Buck – Buck the World (G-Unit)
- Maroon 5 – It Won't Be Soon Before Long

=== 2008 ===
- Vanessa Amorosi – Somewhere in the Real World (Universal Republic UK)
- Black Tide – Light From Above
- G-Unit – T.O.S: Terminate on Sight (G-Unit)
- Sean Garrett – Turbo 919 (Bet I Penned Music)
- Hollywood Undead – Swan Songs
- The Knux – Remind Me in 3 Days... (Chic Freak Music)
- Lady Gaga – The Fame
- M.I.A. – How Many Votes Fix Mix (XL)
- N.E.R.D – Seeing Sounds (Star Trak)
- New Kids on the Block – The Block
- Pussycat Dolls – Doll Domination
- Rise Against – Appeal to Reason (Geffen/DGC)
- Robyn – The Rakamonie EP (Konichiwa/Cherrytree)
- Robyn – Robyn (Konichiwa/Cherrytree)
- Soulja Boy Tell 'Em – iSouljaBoyTellEm (Stacks On Deck Ent./HHH/Collipark)
- Robin Thicke – Something Else (Star Trak)

=== 2009 ===
- 50 Cent – Before I Self Destruct (Shady/Aftermath)
- Black Eyed Peas – The E.N.D.
- Bobby Creekwater – The B.C. Era Deuce EP (Shady/BGOV)
- Brand New – Daisy (DGC/Procrastinate!)
- Them Crooked Vultures – Them Crooked Vultures (DGC)
- Eminem – Relapse (Shady/Aftermath)
- Hollywood Undead – Desperate Measures
- Lady Gaga – The Fame Monster (Streamline/KonLive/Cherrytree)
- LMFAO – Party Rock (Cherrytree/will.i.am Music Group)
- Marilyn Manson – The High End of Low
- OneRepublic – Waking Up (Mosley Music Group)
- Papa Roach – Metamorphosis (DGC)
- Timbaland – Shock Value II (Blackground/Mosley Music Group)
- Tokio Hotel – Humanoid (Cherrytree)
- U2 – No Line on the Horizon

== 2010s ==
=== 2010 ===
- Black Eyed Peas – The Beginning
- Keyshia Cole – Calling All Hearts
- Diddy – Dirty Money – Last Train to Paris (Bad Boy)
- El Debarge – Second Chance
- Eminem – Recovery (Shady/Aftermath)
- Escape the Fate – Escape the Fate
- Far East Movement – Free Wired
- Girlicious – Rebuilt
- Keri Hilson – No Boys Allowed
- M.I.A. – Maya (XL)
- N.E.R.D – Nothing
- Pharrell Williams – Despicable Me: Original Motion Picture Soundtrack (Star Trak)
- The Pretty Reckless – The Pretty Reckless EP
- The Pretty Reckless – Light Me Up
- Robyn – Body Talk Pt. 1 (Konichiwa/Cherrytree)
- Robyn – Body Talk Pt. 2 (Konichiwa/Cherrytree)
- Robyn – Body Talk (Konichiwa/Cherrytree)
- Soulja Boy – The DeAndre Way (SODMG/Collipark)
- Maroon 5 – Hands All Over
- Die Antwoord – Enter the Ninja

=== 2011 ===
- All Time Low – Dirty Work
- Bad Meets Evil – Hell: The Sequel (Shady)
- Travis Barker – Give the Drummer Some
- Black Tide – Post Mortem
- Blink-182 – Neighborhoods (DGC)
- The Game – The R.E.D. Album (DGC)
- Hollywood Undead – American Tragedy
- Lady Gaga – Born This Way (Streamline/KonLive)
- Lauren Alaina – Wildflower (19/Mercury Nashville)
- Limp Bizkit – Gold Cobra
- Limp Bizkit – Icon
- Various artists – Rio (Music From The Motion Picture)
- LMFAO – Sorry for Party Rocking (Cherrytree/will.i.am Music Group)
- Lloyd – King of Hearts (Young Goldie)
- Rise Against – Endgame (DGC)
- Scotty McCreery – Clear as Day (19/Mercury Nashville)
- Yelawolf – Radioactive (Ghet-O-Vision/DGC/Shady)

=== 2012 ===
- Azealia Banks – 1991
- Nelly Furtado – The Spirit Indestructible (Mosley Music Group)
- The Game – Jesus Piece (DGC)
- Girls' Generation – The Boys (SM Entertainment)
- Imagine Dragons – Night Visions (KIDinaKORNER)
- John Powell – Dr. Seuss' The Lorax: Original Songs from the Motion Picture
- Kendrick Lamar – good kid, m.A.A.d city (TDE/Aftermath)
- Lana Del Rey – Born to Die (Polydor/Stranger)
- Machine Gun Kelly – Lace Up (Bad Boy)
- Madonna – MDNA
- No Doubt – Push and Shove
- Haley Reinhart – Listen Up!
- Scotty McCreery – Christmas With Scotty McCreery (19/Mercury Nashville)
- Slaughterhouse – Welcome to: Our House (Shady)
- Van Halen – A Different Kind of Truth
- Zedd – Clarity

=== 2013 ===
- Colette Carr – Skitszo
- Eminem -The Marshall Mathers LP 2 (Shady/Aftermath)
- French Montana – Excuse My French (Bad Boy/Maybach Music Group)
- Hollywood Undead – Notes from the Underground
- Lady Gaga – Artpop (Streamline)
- M.I.A. – Matangi (N.E.E.T.)
- Madonna – MDNA World Tour
- Scotty McCreery -See You Tonight (19/Mercury Nashville)
- Natalia Kills – Trouble
- OneRepublic – Native (Mosley Music Group)
- Jessica Sanchez – Me, You & the Music
- Skylar Grey – Don't Look Down
- Robin Thicke – Blurred Lines (Star Trak)
- Various artists – The Great Gatsby: Music from Baz Luhrmann's Film (Watertower)
- will.i.am – #willpower (will.i.am Music Group)

=== 2014 ===
- Bas – Last Winter (Dreamville)
- Tony Bennett & Lady Gaga – Cheek To Cheek (Streamline/Interscope/Columbia)
- Lana Del Rey – Ultraviolence
- Keyshia Cole – Point of No Return
- Maroon 5 – V
- Robin Thicke – Paula (Star Trak)
- Röyksopp & Robyn – Do It Again (Dog Triumph/Cherrytree)
- Röyksopp – The Inevitable End (Dog Triumph/Cherrytree)
- Schoolboy Q – Oxymoron (TDE)
- U2 – Songs of Innocence
- Various artists – Divergent: Original Motion Picture Soundtrack
- Various artists – Shady XV (Shady)

=== 2015 ===
- Børns – Dopamine (REZidual)
- Dr. Dre – Compton (Aftermath)
- Dreamville – Revenge of the Dreamers II (Dreamville)
- Selena Gomez – Revival
- Imagine Dragons – Smoke + Mirrors (KIDinaKORNER)
- Kendrick Lamar – To Pimp a Butterfly (TDE/Aftermath)
- Hollywood Undead – Day of the Dead
- Machine Gun Kelly – General Admission (Bad Boy)
- Madonna – Rebel Heart
- Lana Del Rey – Honeymoon
- Lauren Alaina – Lauren Alaina (19/Mercury Nashville)
- Rae Sremmurd – SremmLife (EarDrummers)
- Rixton – Let the Road (School Boy/Giant Little Man/Mad Love)
- Robyn & La Bagatelle Magique – Love Is Free (Konichiwa/Cherrytree)
- Various artists – Southpaw: Music from and Inspired by the Motion Picture (Shady)
- Tame Impala – Currents (Fiction/Modular)
- X Ambassadors – VHS (KIDinaKORNER)
- Yelawolf – Love Story (Slumerican/Shady)
- Zedd – True Colors

=== 2016 ===
- The 1975 – I Like It When You Sleep, for You Are So Beautiful yet So Unaware of It (Dirty Hit)
- 6LACK – Free 6LACK (LVRN)
- AlunaGeorge – I Remember (Island)
- Band of Horses – Why Are You OK
- Bas – Too High to Riot (Dreamville)
- Cassius – Ibifornia (Love Justice SARL/Justice SARL)
- DJ Snake – Encore
- Dreezy – No Hard Feelings
- Jack Garratt – Phase (Polydor)
- Goldroom – West of the West (Downtown)
- J. Cole – 4 Your Eyez Only (Dreamville/Roc Nation)
- Carly Rae Jepsen – Emotion Remixed + (604/School Boy)
- Carly Rae Jepsen - Emotion: Side B (604/School Boy)
- K. Flay – Crush Me (Night Street)
- K Camp – Lyric Ave
- Michael Kiwanuka – Love & Hate (Polydor)
- Kendrick Lamar – untitled unmastered (TDE/Aftermath)
- Lady Gaga – – Joanne (Streamline)
- Lion Babe – Begin (Polydor)
- M.I.A. – AIM (Polydor)
- Ella Mai – Change (10 Summers)
- OneRepublic – Oh My My (Mosley)
- Rae Sremmurd – SremmLife 2 (EarDrummers)
- The Rolling Stones – Blue & Lonesome (Polydor)
- Schoolboy Q – Blank Face LP (TDE)
- Shura – Nothing's Real (Polydor)
- Skylar Grey – Natural Causes (KidinaKorner)
- Gwen Stefani – This Is What the Truth Feels Like
- Sting – 57th & 9th (A&M)
- Tkay Maidza – Tkay (Downtown)
- Tory Lanez – I Told You (Mad Love)
- Various artists – La La Land: Original Motion Picture Soundtrack

=== 2017 ===
- 50 Cent – Best of 50 Cent (Shady/Aftermath)
- Lauren Alaina – Road Less Traveled (19/Mercury Nashville)
- Blackbear – Cybersex (Beartrap/Alamo)
- Cashmere Cat – 9 (Mad Love)
- Electric Guest – Plural (Downtown)
- Eminem – Revival (Shady/Aftermath)
- Feist – Pleasure (Polydor)
- Ice Cube – Death Certificate (25th Anniversary Edition) (Lench Mob)
- Imagine Dragons – Evolve (KIDinaKORNER)
- JID – The Never Story (Dreamville)
- K.Flay – Every Where Is Some Where (Night Street)
- Kendrick Lamar – Damn (TDE/Aftermath)
- Lana Del Rey – Lust for Life (Polydor)
- Machine Gun Kelly – Bloom (Bad Boy)
- Maroon 5 – Red Pill Blues (222)
- Mike Will Made It – Ransom 2 (EarDrummers)
- Mura Masa – Mura Masa (Downtown/Polydor/Anchor Point)
- Oliver – Full Circle
- Playboi Carti – Playboi Carti (AWGE)
- San Fermin – Belong (Downtown)
- Smokepurpp – Deadstar (Alamo)
- Gwen Stefani – You Make It Feel Like Christmas
- Tei Shi – Crawl Space (Downtown)
- Two-9 – FRVR (EarDrummers)
- U2 – Songs of Experience (Island)
- Yelawolf – Trial by Fire (Slumerican/Shady)

=== 2018 ===
- Børns – Blue Madonna
- Various artists – Black Panther: The Album (TDE/Aftermath)
- Cozz – Effected (Tha Committee/Dreamville)
- Moneybagg Yo – 2 Heartless (N-Less)
- Wes Period – Pretty Words (Facet)
- Tory Lanez – Memories Don't Die (Mad Love)
- Arin Ray – Platinum Fire
- Rich The Kid – The World Is Yours (Rich Forever Music)
- Kali Uchis – Isolation (Virgin EMI)
- Thirty Seconds to Mars – America
- Smokepurpp & Murda Beatz – Bless Yo Trap (Cactus Jack/Alamo)
- J. Cole – KOD (Dreamville/Roc Nation)
- Sting & Shaggy – 44/876 (A&M)
- Rae Sremmurd – SR3MM (EarDrummers)
- 6 Dogs & Danny Wolf – 6 Wolves (Trust Me Danny/Mad Love)
- Playboi Carti – Die Lit (AWGE)
- Juice Wrld – Goodbye & Good Riddance (Grade A)
- Jay Rock – Redemption (TDE)
- Moneybagg Yo – Bet On Me (N-Less)
- Bas – Milky Way (Dreamville)
- Eminem – Kamikaze (Shady/Aftermath)
- The Night Game – The Night Game (Real Johnson/Vertigo/Capitol)
- Pale Waves – My Mind Makes Noises (Dirty Hit)
- 6LACK – East Atlanta Love Letter (LVRN)
- Machine Gun Kelly – Binge
- Lady Gaga & Bradley Cooper – A Star Is Born (soundtrack)
- Sheck Wes – Mudboy (Cactus Jack/GOOD)
- Ella Mai – Ella Mai (10 Summers)
- Future & Juice Wrld – Wrld on Drugs (Grade A/Freebandz/Epic)
- Lil Mosey – Northsbest
- Summer Walker – Last Day of Summer (LVRN)
- Black Eyed Peas – Masters of the Sun Vol. 1
- Louis the Child – Kids At Play
- The Struts – Young & Dangerous
- Tory Lanez – Love Me Now? (Mad Love)
- Jacob Banks – Village (Darkroom)
- Jay Critch – Hood Favorite (Rich Forever)
- K Camp – Rare Sound (RARE Sound/EMPIRE)
- Kris Wu – Antares (Ace Unit/Go East/Universal Music China)
- Smino – Noir (Zero Fatigue/Downtown)
- Imagine Dragons – Origins (KIDinaKORNER)
- Lil Durk – Signed to the Streets 3 (Only The Family/Alamo)
- Nightly – The Sound of Your Voice
- Mike Will Made It – Creed II: The Album (EarDrummers)
- Moneybagg Yo – Reset (N-Less)
- JID – DiCaprio 2 (Dreamville)
- The 1975 – A Brief Inquiry into Online Relationships (Dirty Hit)
- Ice Cube – Everythangs Corrupt (Lench Mob)
- Gryffin – Gravity, Pt. 1 (Darkroom)
- Robyn – Honey (Konichiwa)

=== 2019 ===
- Dermot Kennedy – Dermot Kennedy (Riggins/Island)
- Boogie – Everythings for Sale (Shady)
- Dreezy – Big Dreez
- Summer Walker – Clear (LVRN)
- Mereba – The Jungle Is the Only Way Out
- DaBaby – Baby on Baby (SCMG)
- The Japanese House – Good at Falling (Dirty Hit)
- Juice Wrld – Death Race for Love (Grade A)
- Louis the Child – Kids at Play (Remixes)
- Rich the Kid – The World Is Yours 2 (Rich Forever)
- Billie Eilish – When We All Fall Asleep, Where Do We Go? (Darkroom)
- Yelawolf – Trunk Muzik III (Slumerican/Shady)
- Blackpink – Kill This Love
- Blackbear – Anonymous (Beartrap/Alamo)
- Schoolboy Q – Crash Talk (TDE)
- Ari Lennox – Shea Butter Baby (Dreamville)
- Smokepurpp – Lost Planet 2.0 (Alamo)
- Stunna 4 Vegas – Big 4x (Billion Dollar Baby)
- Carly Rae Jepsen – Dedicated (604/School Boy)
- Moneybagg Yo – 43va Heartless (N-Less)
- Madonna – Madame X (Boy Toy/Live Nation)
- Nightly – Talk You Down
- X Ambassadors – Orion (KIDinaKORNER)
- K Camp – Wayy 2 Kritical (RARE Sound/EMPIRE)
- Pi'erre Bourne – The Life of Pi'erre 4 (SossHouse)
- Mustard – Perfect Ten (10 Summers)
- Dreamville & J. Cole – Revenge of the Dreamers III (Dreamville)
- Machine Gun Kelly – Hotel Diablo (EST 19XX/Bad Boy)
- Blacc Zacc – Trappin Like Zacc (SCMG)
- Cuco – Para Mi
- Lil Durk – Love Songs 4 the Streets 2 (OTF/Alamo)
- Various artists – 13 Reasons Why: Season 3 (Soundtrack)
- Lana Del Rey – Norman Fucking Rockwell
- Earthgang – Mirrorland (Dreamville/Spillage Village)
- Cashmere Cat – Princess Catgirl (Mad Love)
- DaBaby – Kirk (SCMG)
- Summer Walker – Over It (LVRN)
- Quiñ – Lucid (Fantasy Soul)
- Tory Lanez – Chixtape 5 (Mad Love)
- Griselda – WWCD (Griselda/Shady)
- Only the Family & Lil Durk – Family over Everything (OTF/Alamo)
- Smokepurpp – Deadstar 2 (Alamo)
- Smino – High 4 Da Highladays (Zero Fatigue/Downtown)

== 2020s ==
=== 2020 ===
- Moneybagg Yo – Time Served (N-Less)
- Selena Gomez – Rare
- Dreamville & J. Cole – Revenge of the Dreamers III (Dreamville)
- Eminem – Music to Be Murdered By (Shady/Aftermath)
- Mura Masa – R.Y.C (Anchor Point)
- Stunna 4 Vegas – Rich Youngin (Billion Dollar Baby)
- Tame Impala – The Slow Rush (Fiction/Modular)
- Blacc Zacc – Carolina Narco (SCMG)
- X Ambassadors – Belong EP (KIDinaKORNER)
- Renforshort – teenage angst EP (Renwasn'there Inc.)
- 5 Seconds of Summer – Calm
- Ari Lennox – Shea Butter Baby (Remix EP) (Dreamville)
- Tory Lanez – The New Toronto 3
- DaBaby – Blame It on Baby (SCMG)
- K Camp – Kiss Five (RARE Sound)
- Kali Uchis – To Feel Alive (Virgin EMI)
- Khea – Trapicheo (Young Flex)
- The 1975 – Notes on a Conditional Form (Dirty Hit)
- Mk.gee – A Museum of Contradiction (IAMSOUND)
- Lady Gaga – Chromatica (Streamline)
- 6lack – 6pc Hot EP (LVRN)
- Jessie Ware – What's Your Pleasure? (PMR/Virgin EMI)
- Louis The Child – Here for Now
- Juice Wrld – Legends Never Die (Grade A)
- Lil Mosey – Certified Hitmaker (Mogul Vision)
- Machine Gun Kelly – Tickets to My Downfall (Bad Boy)
- Spillage Village – Spilligion (Dreamville/SinceThe80s)
- Westside Gunn – Who Made the Sunshine (Griselda/Shady)
- Blackpink – The Album (YG)
- Various artists – Clouds (Music from the Disney+ Original Movie) (Walt Disney/Wayfarer)
- BlocBoy JB – FatBoy (Foundation)
- The Struts – Strange Days
- Stunna 4 Vegas – Welcome to 4 Vegas (Billion Dollar Baby)
- Playboi Carti – Whole Lotta Red (AWGE)

=== 2021 ===
- BRS Kash – Kash Only (LVRN)
- Celeste – Not Your Muse (Atlas Artists)
- Slowthai – Tyron (Method/AWGE)
- Alexander 23 – Oh No, Not Again! EP
- Various artists – The SpongeBob Movie: Sponge on the Run (Original Motion Picture Soundtrack) (Nickelodeon/NEON16)
- Selena Gomez – Revelación (SMG)
- Bad Gyal – Warm Up (Aftercluv)
- Lana Del Rey – Chemtrails over the Country Club
- Benny Blanco – Friends Keep Secrets 2 (Friends Keep Secrets)
- Moneybagg Yo – A Gangsta's Pain (N-Less/CMG)
- Sir Sly – The Rise & Fall of Loverboy
- Morray – Street Sermons (Pick Six)
- J. Cole – The Off-Season (Dreamville/Roc Nation)
- Cloves – Nightmare On Elmfield Road
- 42 Dugg – Free Dem Boyz (4PF/CMG)
- Mereba – Azeb EP
- Renforshort – off saint dominique EP
- Maroon 5 – Jordi (222)
- Pi'erre Bourne – The Life of Pi'erre 5 (SossHouse)
- Jax Jones – Deep Joy EP (Deep Joy Edition)
- Inhaler – It Won't Always Be Like This
- EST Gee – Bigger Than Life or Death (Warlike/CMG)
- Dave – We're All Alone in This Together (Neighbourhood)
- Billie Eilish – Happier Than Ever (Darkroom)
- August Ponthier – Faking My Own Death
- Glaive – all dogs go to heaven
- K Camp – Float (RARE Sound)
- Grip – I Died for This!? (Stray Society/Shady)
- OneRepublic – Human (Mosley)
- Big30 – King of Killbranch (N-Less/Bread Gang)
- Imagine Dragons – Mercury – Act 1 (KIDinaKORNER)
- Lady Gaga – Dawn of Chromatica
- Niki, DJ Snake & 88rising – Shang-Chi and the Legend of the Ten Rings: The Album (MARVEL/Hollywood)
- Kacey Musgraves – Star-Crossed (MCA Nashville)
- Lisa – Lalisa (YG Entertainment)
- X Ambassadors – The Beautiful Liar (KIDinaKORNER)
- Ryan Trey – A 64 East Saga (#JUSTAREGULARDAY)
- Tony Bennett & Lady Gaga – Love for Sale (Columbia)
- Lute – Gold Mouf (Dreamville)
- glaive & ericoda – then i'll be happy (LISTEN TO THE KIDS)
- Sam Fender – Seventeen Going Under
- Finneas O'Connell – Optimist (OYOY)
- Louis the Child – Euphoria
- Lana Del Rey – Blue Banisters
- Summer Walker – Still Over It (LVRN)
- DaBaby – Back on My Baby Jesus Sh!t Again (SCMG)
- Gracie Abrams – This Is What It Feels Like
- Ama – At Least We Have This
- Kevvo – Cotidiano
- Cozz – Fortunate (Tha Committee/Dreamville)
- EST Gee – Bigger than Life or Death, Pt. 2 (Warlike/CMG)
- Juice Wrld – Fighting Demons (Grade A)
- TM88 & Pi'erre Bourne – Yo!88 (Capitol)

=== 2022 ===
- 42 Dugg & EST Gee – Last Ones Left (Warlike/CMG)
- Alexander 23 – Aftershock
- Ari Lennox – Age/Sex/Location (Dreamville)
- Ari Lennox – Away Message (Dreamville)
- Bas – [BUMP] Pick Me Up (Dreamville)
- Big30 – Last Man Standing (Bread Gang/N-Less)
- Blackpink – Born Pink (YG)
- Carly Rae Jepsen – The Loneliest Time (604/School Boy)
- CMG – Gangsta Art (CMG)
- Conway the Machine – God Don't Make Mistakes (Drumwork/Griselda/Shady)
- Cuco – Fantasy Gateway
- DaBaby & YoungBoy Never Broke Again – Better than You (SCMG/Never Broke Again/Atlantic)
- DaBaby – Baby on Baby 2 (SCMG)
- Dermot Kennedy – Sonder (Riggins/Island)
- Dreamville – D-Day: A Gangsta Grillz Mixtape (Dreamville)
- Earthgang – Ghetto Gods (Dreamville/Spillage Village)
- Eminem – Curtain Call 2 (Shady/Aftermath)
- EST Gee – I Never Felt Nun (Warlike/CMG)
- GloRilla – Anyways, Life's Great... (CMG)
- Imagine Dragons – Mercury – Act 2 (KIDinaKORNER)
- JID – The Forever Story (Dreamville)
- Ken Carson – X (Opium)
- Kendrick Lamar – Mr. Morale & the Big Steppers (pgLang/TDE/Aftermath)
- Machine Gun Kelly – Mainstream Sellout (Bad Boy)
- Lil Mosey – UNI (Mogul Vision)
- Lil Mosey – VER (Mogul Vision)
- Mozzy – Survivor's Guilt (CMG)
- Pi'erre Bourne – Good Movie (SossHouse)
- Stunna 4 Vegas – Rae Rae’s Son (Billion Dollar Baby)
- Westside Boogie – More Black Superheroes (Shady)

=== 2023 ===
- Carly Rae Jepsen – The Loveliest Time (604/School Boy)
- DaBaby – Call Da Fireman (SCMG)
- Destroy Lonely – If Looks Could Kill (Opium)
- EST Gee – Mad (Warlike/CMG)
- EST Gee – El Toro 2 (Warlike/CMG)
- Ez Mil – DU4LI7Y: REDUX (Shady/Aftermath)
- Moneybagg Yo – Hard to Love (N-Less/CMG)
- Karol G – Mañana Será Bonito (Bichota Season) (Bichota)
- Ken Carson – A Great Chaos (Opium)
- Jon Batiste – World Music Radio (Verve)
- Pi'erre Bourne – Grails (SossHouse)
- Yo Gotti & DJ Drama – I Showed U So (Inevitable)
- Boygenius – The Record

=== 2024 ===
- 42 Dugg – 4eva Us Neva Them (4PF/CMG)
- Billie Eilish – Hit Me Hard and Soft
- Camila Cabello – C,XOXO (Geffen)
- Destroy Lonely – Love Lasts Forever (Opium)
- Gracie Abrams – The Secret of Us
- Eminem – The Death of Slim Shady (Coup de Grâce) (Shady/Aftermath)
- Gwen Stefani – Bouquet
- Homixide Gang – I5u5we5 (Opium)
- Juice Wrld – The Pre-Party EP (Grade A)
- Juice Wrld – The Party Never Ends (Grade A)
- Kendrick Lamar – GNX (pgLang)
- Snoop Dogg – Missionary (Death Row/Aftermath)

=== 2025 ===
- EST Gee – I Aint Feeling You (CMG)
- Inhale – Open Wide (Polydor)
- Olly Alexander – Polari (Polydor)
- Role Model – Kansas Anymore (The Longest Goodbye)
- Lady Gaga – Mayhem (Streamline)
- Playboi Carti – Music (AWGE)
- Selena Gomez & Benny Blanco – I Said I Love You First (SMG Music LLC/Friends Keep Secrets)
- 2hollis – Star (2hollis)
- Elton John & Brandi Carlile – Who Believes in Angels? (WAB Recordings/EMI/Mercury)
- Ken Carson – More Chaos (Opium)
- D4vd – Withered (Darkroom)
- Cuco – Ridin' (Walk the Trail, Inc)
- BoyNextDoor – No Genre (EP)
- Avicii – Avicii Forever
- Anyma – The End of Genesys (Anyma)
- EST Gee – My World (CMG)
- Karol G – Tropicoqueta (Bichota Records LLC)
- Elliot James Reay – All This to Say I Love You EP (Elliot James Reay LTD/EMI)
- Pi'erre Bourne – Made In Paris (SossHouse)
- JID – GDLU (Preluxe) EP (Dreamville)
- Homixide Gang – Homixide Lifestyle 2 (Opium)
- Eminem – Stans: The Official Soundtrack (Shady/Aftermath)
- JID – God Does Like Ugly (Dreamville)
- Destroy Lonely – Broken Hearts 3 (Opium)
- Nine Inch Nails – Tron: Ares (Null Corporation/Walt Disney)

=== 2026 ===
- 42 Dugg – Part 3 (4PF/CMG)
- DaBaby – Be More Grateful (SCMG)
- J. Cole – The Fall-Off (Dreamville)
- 6lack – Love Is the New Gangsta (LVRN)
- Ken Carson – Xperiment (Opium)
