= Magnolia (Playboi Carti song) =

2017 single by Playboi Carti

Single by Playboi Carti

from the album Playboi Carti
- Released: April 14, 2017
- Recorded: March, 2017
- Genre: Trap
- Length: 3:02
- Label: AWGE; Interscope
- Songwriters: Jordan Carter; Jordan Jenks
- Producer: Pi'erre Bourne

Playboi Carti singles chronology
"Wokeuplikethis" (2017)	"Magnolia" (2017)	"Raf" (2017)

Music video
- "Magnolia" on YouTube

"Magnolia" is a song by the American rapper Playboi Carti. It was released by AWGE and Interscope Records on April 14, 2017 as the third single from his debut commercial mixtape, Playboi Carti (2017). It was written, performed, and mixed by Carter alongside American record producer Pi'erre Bourne. It is characterized by a mixture of a New Orleans bounce beat and sounds, including booming grooves and rattling low-end bass. "Magnolia" was met with positive reviews from critics, and was considered one of the best songs of the year by Pitchfork, Billboard, and The Fader.

== Background ==
The beginning of the song contains a sample from The Jamie Foxx Show (1996–2001), which is used as Pi'erre Bourne's producer tag. The song's title refers to the Magnolia Projects in New Orleans.

== Composition ==
Pitchfork's Matthew Ramirez commented on Magnolia, saying that it "boasted" a "giddy New Orleans bounce beat", that was "filled with booming grooves and rattling low-end bass".

== Music video ==
A music video was released for the song on July 8, 2017, of 106 & Park. It was directed by Hidji Films and features cameo appearances from song's producer Pi'erre Bourne, the ASAP Mob colletive, m14thew, harve, Slim Jxmmi, x.mofe, Southside, A Boogie wit da Hoodie, Don Q, Nav, Casanova, Smooky Margielaa, Juelz Santana and Cash, one of the XO members. The music video was filmed in New York City. As of May 2025, the video had gained over 218 million views on the video-sharing platform YouTube.

== Remixes ==
Multiple rappers released freestyles and remixes of Magnolia due to its popularity. In May 2017, Canadian rapper Tory Lanez remixed the song and was denied permission by American producer Pi'erre Bourne. Later in July 2017, American rapper Lil Wayne had released a freestyle that was included in his second extended play (EP) In Tune We Trust (2017).

== Critical reception ==
Matthew Ramirez of Pitchfork regarded it as one of the standout tracks of Playboi Carti's eponymous mixtape, and called it a "classically carefree rap anthem".

"Magnolia" was placed in year-end lists from The Fader, Pitchfork and Billboard. Pitchfork considered it the 83rd best song of the year. Author Mehan Jayasuriya mentioned how Carti's "laconic" flow had "matched" American record producer Harry Fraud's "impressionistic beat".

== Charts ==
=== Weekly charts ===
Chart (2017)	Peak position
Canada Hot 100 (Billboard)	51
US Billboard Hot 100	29
US Hot R&B/Hip-Hop Songs (Billboard)	11
US Hot Rap Songs (Billboard)	7
US Rhythmic Airplay (Billboard)	20

=== Year-end charts ===
Chart (2017)	Position
US Billboard Hot 100	79
US Hot R&B/Hip-Hop Songs (Billboard)	42

== Certifications ==
Region	Certification	Certified units/sales
Brazil (Pro-Música Brasil)	Gold	30,000^{‡}
Canada (Music Canada)	2× Platinum	160,000^{‡}
Denmark (IFPI Danmark)	Gold	45,000^{‡}
France (SNEP)	Gold	100,000^{‡}
New Zealand (RMNZ)	2× Platinum	60,000^{‡}
Poland (ZPAV)	Platinum	50,000^{‡}
Portugal (AFP)	Gold	5,000^{‡}
United Kingdom (BPI)	Platinum	600,000^{‡}
United States (RIAA)	8× Platinum	8,000,000^{‡}
^{‡} Sales+streaming figures based on certification alone.

== Release history ==
Country	Date	Format(s)	Label	Ref.
United States	June 13, 2017	Rhythmic contemporary radio	AWGE; Interscope	
