= Carolina Narco =

Studio album by Blacc Zacc
- Released: March 6, 2020
- Genres: Hip hop, Trap
- Length: 31:08
- Labels: Dirty Money Entertainment; South Coast Music Group; Interscope
- Producers: YoungKio; OG Parker; 808 Mafia; Cubeatz; Go Grizzly; Sool Got Hits; Pvlace; Mario Peterson; Romano; L.N.K; Anthony Costley; Pearl Lion; June James; SoolGotHits; Jerm Juice; Solo Steeze; Rott; Eliot Aage Bohr; India Got Them Beats

Blacc Zacc chronology
Dirty Summer: The Re-Up (2020)	Carolina Narco (2020)	DME Walk Down Gang (2021)

Singles from Carolina Narco
- 1. "Carolina Narco" Released: March 2020

Carolina Narco is the debut studio album by South Carolina-based rapper Blacc Zacc, released on March 6, 2020 through Interscope Records, Dirty Money Entertainment, and South Coast Music Group. The album includes guest appearances from Interscope labelmates DaBaby, Stunna 4 Vegas, and Moneybagg Yo, as well as Yo Gotti.

== Background ==
In 2019, Blacc Zacc signed a recording contract with Interscope Records. Following the announcement of his new deal, he revealed the title of his debut album, Carolina Narco, and announced an initial release date. Carolina Narco draws on his experiences and influences from his hometown in South Carolina. The album showcases his unique style and storytelling ability, highlighting success, struggle, and street life themes.

In addition to the audio release, Carolina Narco was accompanied by a 17-minute cinematic short film, which premiered on March 26, 2020. The film serves as a visual extension of the album, bringing its narratives to life and providing a deeper insight into Blacc Zacc's artistic vision.

Carolina Narco received attention from various music critics and fans alike. The album's blend of hard-hitting beats and authentic lyrics.

== Music video ==
The visual for the album's lead single, "Carolina Narco", was released on February 6, 2020.

== Track listing ==
No.	Title	Writer(s)	Producer(s)	Length
1.	"Murder for Hire"	Zachary Chapman; Rasool Diaz; Petar Lyondev	Go Grizzly; Sool Got Hits	2:02
2.	"Carolina Narco"	Zachary Chapman; Kiowa Roukema	YoungKio	3:44
3.	"Fucc Up a Checc" (featuring Yo Gotti)	Zachary Chapman; Denis Berger; Kiowa Roukema	YoungKio; Pvlace	3:46
4.	"Bang" (featuring DaBaby)	Zachary Chapman; Terry Dene; Jonathan Kirk Leon	L.N.K; Mario Peterson; Romano	2:44
5.	"Coccy" (featuring Stunna 4 Vegas)	Zachary Chapman; Kevin Gomringer; Tim Gomringer	Anthony Costley; Cubeatz; June James	3:30
6.	"All Day"	Zachary Chapman; Joshua Parker; Terrence Williams	OG Parker; Pearl Lion; Romano	1:57
7.	"Make a Sale" (featuring Moneybagg Yo)	Zachary Chapman; Rasool Diaz; Demario White	SoolGotHits	2:30
8.	"Plain Jane"	Zachary Chapman; Kiowa Roukema	YoungKio	3:06
9.	"What I Did Today"	Zachary Chapman; Jeremy Dupree; De'marcus Walker	Jerm Juice; Solo Steeze	2:28
10.	"No Mo"	Zachary Chapman; Raymond Herring; Kiowa Roukema	Rott; YoungKio	2:57
11.	"Trap God"	Zachary Chapman; India Williams	Eliot Aage Bohr; India Got Them Beats	2:24
Total length:				31:08

== Release history ==
Release history and formats for Carolina Narco
Region	Date	Format	Label
Various	March 6, 2020	Streaming; digital download; CD	Interscope

== See also ==
- Interscope Records discography
