= HXG =

American hip-hop duo

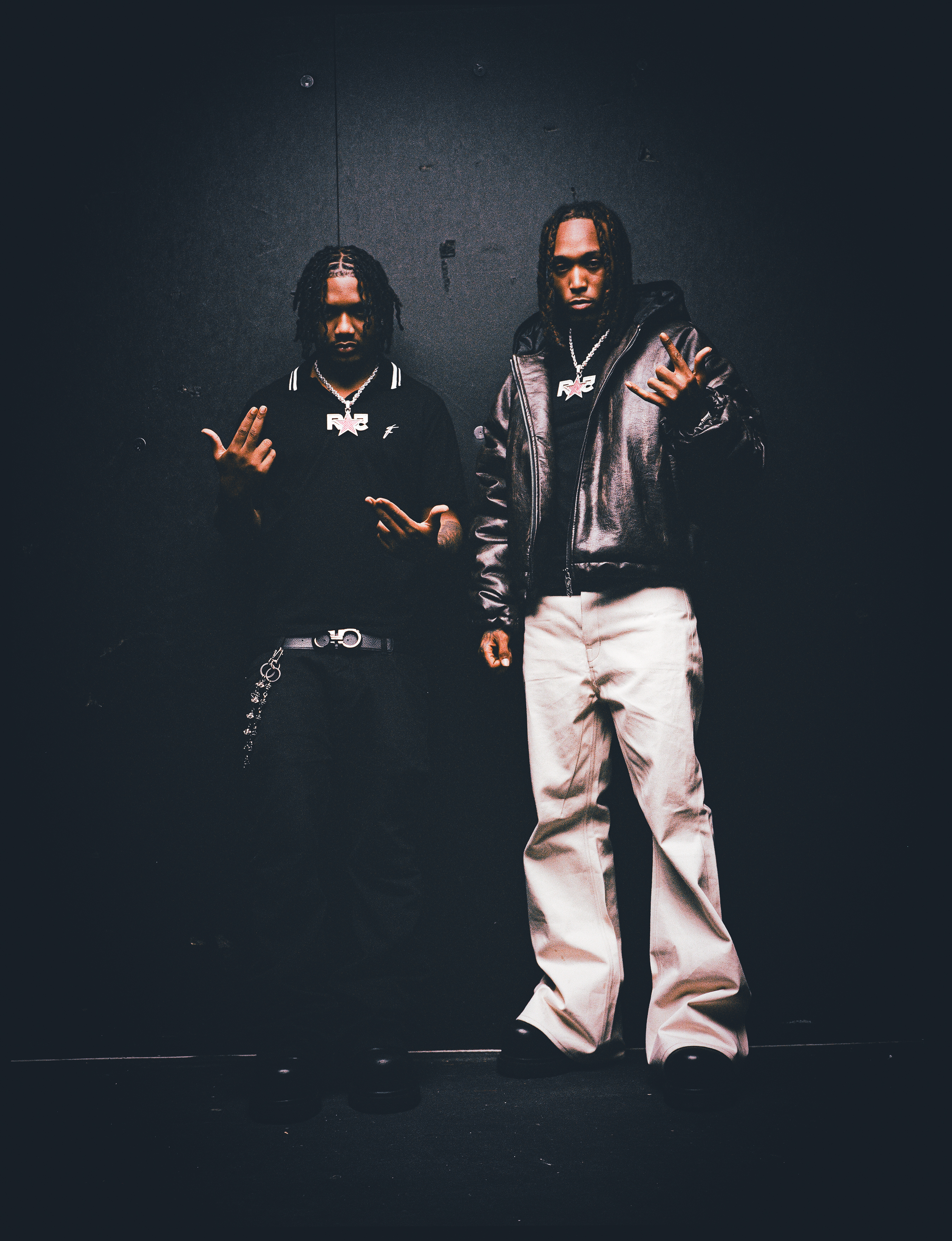
- Beno! (left) and Meechie in 2025

Background information
- Also known as: Homixide Gang
- Origin: Atlanta, Georgia, U.S.
- Genres: Rage; trap
- Years active: 2019–present
- Labels: Opium; Interscope; Foundation; Ingrooves
- Members: Keyon "HXG Beno!" Thomas; Demetrius "HXG Meechie" Chatman
- Website: www.hxg55555.com

HXG (short for and pronounced "Homixide Gang") is an American hip-hop duo that was founded in 2019, and signed to Playboi Carti's Opium record label in 2021. The group consists of Beno! and Meechie. Emerging as part of the underground Atlanta rap scene, HXG gained significant attention after becoming one of only four artists signed to Opium, contributing to the Opium label and its distinct sound.

== History ==
HXG originates from Atlanta, Georgia, and is heavily influenced by the city's trap culture. They often use their music to portray their raw emotions and life stories, blending introspection with confidence. Both members were affiliated with Carti before officially signing to Opium, where they began receiving significant exposure within the underground rap community. Before signing to Opium, Beno! and Meechie built a cult following through their energetic performances and distinctive sound. Their breakout single, titled "SSN", caught the attention of Carti, leading to their signing with Opium. Meechie recalled Carti's reaction to the track: "Y’all are superstars."

HXG officially joined Opium in 2021, becoming part of the label's roster alongside artists Ken Carson and Destroy Lonely. They released debut EP, Snotty World in 2021. Their sound, defined by distorted 808 drums, experimental beats, and ad-lib-heavy flows, has drawn comparisons to Carti's Whole Lotta Red, while maintaining its own distinct identity. In December 2022, HXG released their debut album, Homixide Lifestyle, featuring collaborations with Destroy Lonely, Ken Carson, and 5unna. The album was praised for the duo's high-energy, punk-inspired aesthetic. Critics and fans noted the project as a defining moment in the emerging Opium sound. The label planned a global tour in 2023 including all members of the Opium roster, but it has since been indefinitely shelved.

In the same year, HXG released two projects: Snot or Not as a second album, and 5th Amndmnt as a debut mixtape. The former included the popular track "Uzi Work", while the latter continued to develop their futuristic trap sound. Their third album, I5u5we5, marked a significant evolution in their artistry, featuring standout tracks like "R50" and "Hi-voltage." The album included collaborations with Lil Yachty and production from rising artist Tana.

In 2025, they released the single "Free Agents", produced by Pi’erre Bourne, as a lead-up to their upcoming fourth studio album, Homixide Lifestyle 2. Homixide Lifestyle 2 was released on 1 August 2025.

== Musical style and influences ==
HXG's music is characterised by its heavy bass lines, experimental production, and energetic flows. Their lyrical content often touches on themes of street life, loyalty, and the pursuit of success. Influenced by Atlanta trap rappers such as Gucci Mane and Future, the duo also draws inspiration from Carti's approach to hip-hop. Their music often blurs the line between trap and punk aesthetics, incorporating distorted beats and raw vocal performances. Their style and visual influences include the WWE and popular nu metal band Slipknot.

In August 2025, Homixide Gang released their 25-track album Homixide Lifestyle 2 through Opium/Interscope Records. The album expanded on their signature rage-rap sound and featured collaborations with Ken Carson and Destroy Lonely, as well as production from Pi'erre Bourne, ATL Jacob, and others. In March 2026, the group officially rebranded, shortening their name to HXG across all streaming platforms. This change preceded the release of their fifth studio album, MADNESS, which began as a deluxe edition of their previous project before evolving into a standalone record. The release for MADNESS included the singles "FLAMETHR0WER" and "RedRum," the last of which was accompanied by a music video directed by Cam Erickson. The duo also promoted the album with a sold-out Rolling Loud pre-show in Los Angeles and announced an international festival run across Europe.

== Discography ==
=== Studio albums ===
List of studio albums, with selected details
Title	Album details
Homixide Lifestyle	Released: November 22, 2022; Label: Opium, Foundation; Format: Digital download, streaming, LP
Snot or Not	Released: April 27, 2023; Label: Opium, Foundation; Format: Digital download, streaming
I5u5we5	Released: May 31, 2024; Label: Opium, Interscope; Format: Digital download, streaming
Homixide Lifestyle 2	Released: August 1, 2025; Label: Opium, Interscope; Format: Digital download, streaming, CD
MADNESS	Scheduled: 2026; Label: Opium, Interscope; Format: Digital download, streaming

=== Mixtapes ===
List of mixtapes, with selected details
Title	Mixtape details
5th Amndmnt	Released: October 27, 2023; Label: Opium, Ingrooves; Format: Digital download, streaming

=== Extended plays ===
List of extended plays, with selected details
Title	EP details
Snotty World	Released: May 5, 2021; Label: Self-released; Format: Digital download, streaming

=== Singles ===
Title	Details
"SSN"	Released: October 11, 2021; Labels: Self-released; Format: Digital download, streaming
"DAMN"	Released: December 9, 2021; Labels: Self-released; Format: Digital download, streaming
"NoEvi"	Released: February 22, 2022; Labels: Self-released; Format: Digital download, streaming
"BBY GRL"	Released: April 26, 2022; Labels: Self-released; Format: Digital download, streaming
"Puttem On"	Released: May 9, 2022; Labels: Self-released; Format: Digital download, streaming
"ADHD"	Released: March 31, 2023; Labels: Opium; Format: Digital download, streaming
"What It Is?!"	Released: October 9, 2023; Labels: Opium; Format: Digital download, streaming; Features: Pi'erre Bourne
"HI-VOLTAGE"	Released: March 29, 2024; Labels: Interscope, Opium; Format: Digital download, streaming
"R50"	Released: May 17, 2024; Labels: Interscope, Opium; Format: Digital download, streaming
"Free Agents"	Released: March 7, 2025; Labels: Opium; Format: Digital download, streaming
"5G"	Released: July 11, 2025; Labels: Interscope, Opium; Format: Digital download, streaming
"RedRum"	Released: June 19, 2026; Labels: Interscope, Opium; Format: Digital download, streaming
"Versus"	Released: August 28, 2026; Labels: Interscope, Opium; Format: Digital download, streaming
