= Eraser (album) =

Studio album by The Knux
- Released: September 27, 2011
- Recorded: Late 2010–11
- Genre: Alternative hip hop, indie rock, pop rock
- Length: 45:44
- Label: Cherrytree, Interscope
- Producer: The Knux, Paul Rosenberg (exec.)

The Knux chronology
Remind Me in 3 Days... (2008)	Eraser (2011)	Eleven (2015)

Singles from Eraser
- 1. "She's So Up" Released: March 1, 2011; 2. "Run" Released: July 12, 2011

Eraser is the second studio album by American alternative hip hop duo the Knux, released on September 27, 2011 via Cherrytree and Interscope Records. The album was preceded by the release of two singles, the first being "She's So Up", followed by "Run" featuring Kid Cudi. Much like their debut effort Remind Me in 3 Days... (2008), the album's production was handled entirely by the Knux themselves, however unlike their debut, it features several guest appearances, including Natalia Kills, Jack Davey, Blake Miller and Kid Cudi.

== Background ==
After spending most of 2009 touring to promote their debut album (Remind Me in 3 Days), 2010 had the Knux back in the studio working on their second release. The album was initially to be released on June 21, 2011 but was pushed back to September. They recorded the album with Robert Orton who has handled production duties on albums by the Police and Lady Gaga.

In April 2011, in an interview with Consequence of Sound, brothers Krispy and Joey talked about how Eraser would reshape their image: "With this album, we want to take those preconceived notions and shatter and erase them," eldest brother Krispy said. "This album sums up everything we want to do. To transcend where we are and to smash everything wide open and make the kind of record that has that big sound we have live. It's had hitting as shit and we keep the mayhem going and keep it free-flowing." Despite that chaotic nature, Joey insists the album begins where the last album left off and delivers one cohesive message, stating, "Every song has its own story, so everything ties into each other." Krispy went on to describe the album as "Heavy, heavy; it's sexy," Krispy insists. "Even those that don't like certain rock bands like that sexiness of certain rock bands. This album's got that '70s feel, but its very modern and straight-forward."

== Critical reception ==
Professional ratings
Review scores
Source	Rating
AllMusic	2.5/5 stars
Los Angeles Times	3.5/5 stars
Consequence of Sound	3/5 stars

In his review for the Los Angeles Times's Music Blog, Matt Diehl called Eraser "one of 2011's most startling, assured releases". He gave praise to the tracks "The Road (Intro)" and "Dead World" commenting, "From the lyrics to the sonics, the Knux here proves uncharacteristically brave amid its sheep-like peers: if anyone is to be heir to OutKast's maverick throne, these guys might already have the keys to the kingdom." Diehl also wrote "“Run,” featuring a memorable cameo from Kid Cudi amid Strokes-style barre chords, is as catchy a single as any released this year; still, even club bangers like the rave-tastic "I See Stars" lace hands-in-the-air melodicism with quizzical melancholy."

Gregory Heaney of AllMusic felt the duo's change in direction, was a move inspired by the Black Eyed Peas, stating "their sophomore effort takes the group's sound into more pop-oriented territories". He complimented the live instrumentation, saying "the album brings the duo's sound more in line with their live performances". He concluded with "While this new direction will probably net the pair more radio play, it'll definitely be a disappointment for anyone who came to the group through the far superior Remind Me in 3 Days."

== Track listing ==
- All songs produced by the Knux.

No.	Title	Length
1.	"The Road (Intro)"	2:35
2.	"She's So Up"	3:38
3.	"You Can't Lose"	3:20
4.	"1974" (featuring Natalia Kills)	3:42
5.	"Razorblade"	3:16
6.	"Run" (featuring Kid Cudi)	3:48
7.	"Queen of the Cold"	4:04
8.	"Maniac"	3:17
9.	"I See Stars" (featuring Jack Davey)	3:53
10.	"Fame-Us" (featuring Blake Miller)	3:27
11.	"Eraser"	3:53
12.	"Beautiful Liar"	3:31
13.	"Dead World"	3:20
Total length:		45:44

Notes

- Track listing confirmed via iTunes Store.
