= Good Movie =

Good Movie may refer to:

- Good Movie (Greg Lawsell album) (2003)
- Good Movie (Pi'erre Bourne album) (2022)
- Good Movie, the titular single from Good Movie (Pi'erre Bourne album) (2022)
