= Good Movie (Pi'erre Bourne album) =

Studio album by Pi'erre Bourne
- Released: September 2, 2022
- Length: 69:14
- Labels: SossHouse; Interscope
- Producer: Pi'erre Bourne

Pi'erre Bourne chronology
The Life of Pi'erre 5 (2021)	Good Movie (2022)	Made in Paris (2025)

Singles from Good Movie
- 1. "Good Movie" Released: August 26, 2022

Good Movie is the third studio album by the American rapper and producer Pi'erre Bourne. It was released by Interscope Records and Sosshouse on September 2, 2022. The album includes guest appearances by Don Toliver and Young Nudy. The album was supported by one single, "Good Movie", which was released on August 26, 2022.

== Critical reception ==
Professional ratings
Review scores
Source	Rating
Pitchfork	6.1/10

In a mixed review, Alphonse Pierre of Pitchfork wrote, "This is a breakup album, or maybe an album about wanting to fall in love after a breakup. Before this record, his lyrics felt strung-together and goofy. But on Good Movie, there's a point when he outdoes himself; some lines are astonishingly inane."

== Track listing ==
All tracks are written and produced by Pi'erre Bourne (Jordan Jenks), except where noted.

Good Movie track listing
No.	Title	Writer(s)	Length
1.	"Opening Scene"		1:05
2.	"Shorty Diary"		4:52
3.	"Logline"		0:32
4.	"Ex Factor"		4:16
5.	"Intro To Love"		0:30
6.	"Love Drill"		4:39
7.	"Hop In My Bed"		4:18
8.	"Superstar"		3:38
9.	"Where You Going"		3:21
10.	"What I Gotta Do"		3:38
11.	"DJ In The Car"		3:09
12.	"Psane" (featuring Don Toliver)	Jenks; Caleb Toliver	4:15
13.	"Kingdom Hall Skit"		0:49
14.	"Kingdom Hall"		3:25
15.	"Witty Skit"		0:44
16.	"Kevin Heart"		3:08
17.	"Sosshouse Party"		3:09
18.	"Safe Haven"		3:25
19.	"Rounds"		2:19
20.	"System"		3:42
21.	"Moving Too Fast" (featuring Young Nudy)	Jenks; Quantavious Thomas	3:32
22.	"Good Movie"		3:05
23.	"Heart Say"		3:49
Total length:			69:14
