= Kura (musician) =

American rapper, songwriter, record producer and engineer (born 2003)

- Also known as: Blockboy K, Blockboy Kura
- Born: Daniel Ryan McAllister c. 2003; Detroit, Michigan, U.S.
- Genres: Hip hop; trap
- Occupations: Rapper; songwriter; record producer; record engineer
- Years active: 2014–present
- Label: SossHouse

Daniel Ryan McAllister (born c. 2003), known professionally as Kura, is an American rapper, songwriter, record producer, and engineer from Detroit, Michigan.

== Career ==
Kura began songwriting, producing, engineering, and rapping at the age of 14 from his bedroom in Michigan. His works were often inspired by Sex Pistols, Aphex Twin, and Pi'erre Bourne, whom he'd later begin working with. At 17, he would later sign with SossHouse, a record label founded by Bourne.

On June 9, 2023, Kura released his debut collaborative studio mixtape titled Born Seditionary with Pi'erre Bourne. On August 11, 2024, he released his solo mixtape, titled disorder. On May 13, 2025, he released his project, titled NO FUTURE. He would then follow it up with DIE PUNK on October 12, 2025. On March 13, 2026, he would follow up with B4RRR, a prelude to his next project.

== Reception ==
Kura has often generated positive reviews for his music. His track "jjjound" was ranked at #24 on The Fader's "Rap Column’s top 30 rap songs of 2024" by Vivian Medithi. Medithi also recommended Kura and Bourne's collaborative tape Born Seditionary as a must-listen for fans trying to get into Bourne's music.

== Musical style ==
Medithi described Kura’s project, Born Seditionary, described as a surprising but effective blend of youthful Detroit rap energy and Pi’erre Bourne’s melodic, experimental production style. A reviewer for Audible Treats wrote how the project is defined by "Kura’s brash, auto-tuned vocals, accentuated by Pi’erre’s distorted and synth-heavy concoctions." Vocally, Kura's known for his "elastic flows and swift melodies". His music has been described as kinetic and melody-driven, with rapid, forward-charging flows that move fluidly between staccato cadences and melodic runs. Lyrically, his works blend playful braggadocio and more observational depictions of contemporary life.
