= Playboi Carti (mixtape) =

Mixtape by Playboi Carti
- Released: April 14, 2017
- Recorded: 2016 – March 2017
- Studios: Surf School Studios (New York); Means Street Studios (Atlanta); Ricci Studio and House of Hit Studios (Los Angeles); Downtown Studios (SoHo)
- Genres: Trap; cloud rap
- Length: 46:51
- Labels: AWGE; Interscope
- Producers: ASAP Rocky (exec.); Chace Johnson (exec.); Harry Fraud; Hit-Boy; J. Cash Beatz; Jake One; JStewOnTheBeat; K-Major; KasimGotJuice; MexikoDro; Murphy Kid; Pi'erre Bourne; Roark Bailey; Ricci Riera; Southside

Playboi Carti chronology
| Death in Tune (2015) | Playboi Carti (2017) | Die Lit (2018) |

Alternative cover
- Alternative cover for physical versions

Singles from Playboi Carti
- 1. "Lookin" Released: March 9, 2017; 2. "Wokeuplikethis" Released: March 10, 2017; 3. "Let It Go" Released: April 14, 2017; 4. "Magnolia" Released: April 14, 2017

Playboi Carti is the debut commercial mixtape by American rapper Playboi Carti, released on April 14, 2017, through AWGE and Interscope Records. The mixtape was primarily produced by Pi'erre Bourne, with additional contributions from Harry Fraud, Southside, Hit-Boy, and Jake One. Rooted in minimalism, Playboi Carti is a trap and cloud rap mixtape characterized by atmospheric production, repetitive flows, and ad-lib–driven performances. Its sound incorporates hazy melodies and bass-heavy percussion, emphasizing mood and rhythm over lyrical density. The mixtape features guest appearances from ASAP Rocky, Lil Uzi Vert, and Leven Kali.

Playboi Carti was supported by the lead singles "Lookin", "Wokeuplikethis", "Let It Go", and "Magnolia", the latter peaking at number 29 on the US Billboard Hot 100. The mixtape received generally favorable reviews from critics, who praised its innovative production and distinctive vocal style. It debuted at number 12 on the US Billboard 200 and was certified Platinum by the Recording Industry Association of America (RIAA) in 2020. An accompanying concert tour began in June 2017.

== Background and production ==
In September 2016, Playboi Carti signed with Interscope Records under ASAP Rocky's AWGE imprint. Two days later, he confirmed that a project was on the way. Recording sessions for the mixtape took place in Los Angeles, Atlanta, and New York, with Carti focusing on a spontaneous recording process—often freestyling entire songs rather than writing lyrics in advance. Most of the mixtape was recorded between 2016 and early 2017, with production primarily handled by Pi'erre Bourne, whose bright, bouncy beats became central to Carti's sound. In an article by Hypebeast from January 2017, it was stated that the mixtape was expected to be released in the first quarter of the year. Carti commented, "I just want [people] to look at it and say, 'If this young nigga from Atlanta can do this, so can I.' [...] I want everybody to get money. My new mixtape is going to show niggas this is the way." In January 2017, Carti announced that his debut mixtape would be released in spring 2017.

Bourne, who had been gaining recognition for his work with underground artists, became instrumental in shaping Carti's sound. His production, characterized by spacey synthesizers, looping melodies, and hard-hitting 808 drums, complemented Carti's freewheeling approach to rapping. Other producers, such as Southside, Jake One, and Harry Fraud, also contributed beats, but Bourne's style became the foundation of the project. He explained that Carti's recording process for the mixtape was focused on capturing raw, spontaneous energy. Carti often recorded songs quickly, sometimes in a single take, to preserve the organic, unpolished feel of the music. Bourne highlighted that the process was more about feeling and vibe than meticulous planning. Bourne and Carti had recorded "Wokeuplikethis" on February 14, 2017, and continued to record until two days before Carti's performance at the South by Southwest (SXSW) festival, in March of that year.

== Composition ==
Playboi Carti is a trap and cloud rap mixtape rooted in minimalism, emphasizing repetition, mood, and atmospheric production rather than lyrical complexity. According to Pitchfork, Carti's verses and hooks "smash into each other with repetition", and his signature ad-libs are not merely embellishments but function as "the main attraction", sometimes even becoming the lyrics themselves. His flows are described as "punctuated" and rhythmically freeform, with rhymes that "float between the production rather than on top of it", creating space for the beats to take the forefront. Tracks such as "Location" are described by Pitchfork as "celestial", while "No. 9" is described as "exotic and regal", illustrating Carti's tendency to let the instrumentals guide a song's momentum rather than adhere to traditional rap structures.

The mixtape's production plays a significant role in shaping its identity. XXL highlights producers including Harry Fraud, Southside, Hit-Boy, and Jake One, but especially points to Pi'erre Bourne as the "audible MVP", producing nearly half of the tape and crafting what Pitchfork calls a balance of "cloud rap with straight up bangers". Bourne's beat for "Magnolia", described as "rumbling infectiously" and accented with a "summery flute", pairs seamlessly with Carti's performance, which XXL likens to his 2015 breakout "Broke Boi". Carti's lyrical content is intentionally sparse, often centering on themes of flexing, lifestyle, and surface-level attraction. On "Half & Half", he repeats the phrase "this is not pop, this some rock" nearly 30 times, while much of "Other Shit" rhymes with the title of the track—examples that Pitchfork cites as an "economical method of getting from one 'Yuh' and 'Ooh' to the next". XXL also describes that "Location" revolves around four repeated bars, yet Carti's performance over Harry Fraud's beat elevates it into one of the project's standout songs.

Rather than aiming for lyrical density, the mixtape is "based almost exclusively off vibes", as XXL describes, calling it "sonically pleasing, hypebeast swag rap." HipHopDX similarly observes that Playboi Carti "isn't a lyricist's mixtape" but praises it as "a confident exercise in brand building", describing it as "a fashion-forward soundtrack for the flex generation". Collaborations also shape the mixtape's tone: Lil Uzi Vert appears on "Wokeuplikethis" and "Lookin", adding "raspy mumble rap expertise" and creating moments of harmony with Carti. ASAP Rocky, a major influence and the mixtape's executive producer, contributes a verse on "New Choppa", reinforcing shared themes of "guns, groupies and ganja". The mixtape's release was preceded by a lengthy delay, which Carti attributed to his search for a producer who could help him develop "Carti's sound".

== Release and promotion ==
Two lead singles were released prior to the mixtape's release; "Lookin" featuring Lil Uzi Vert was released on March 9, 2017, and "Wokeuplikethis" featuring the same artist, released on March 10, 2017. On April 13, 2017, Carti revealed the official artwork and tracklist for the mixtape. The singles "Magnolia" and "Let It Go" were released on April 14, 2017, a few hours prior to the mixtape's release. Playboi Carti was released through AWGE and Interscope Records on April 14, 2017; it is Carti's major-label debut mixtape.

"Magnolia" received a music video directed by Hidji Films on July 10, 2017. A music video was released for "Wokeuplikethis" directed by James "JMP" Pereira on August 9, 2017. A music video for "New Choppa" was released on August 31, 2017. To support the mixtape, Carti embarked on the Playboi Carti Tour during the summer of 2017, performing across various cities in North America.

== Critical reception ==
Playboi Carti ratings
Aggregate scores
| Source | Rating |
|---|---|
| Metacritic | 69/100 |
Review scores
| Source | Rating |
| HipHopDX | 2.9/5 |
| Pitchfork | 7.3/10 |
| PopMatters | 6/10 |
| Vice | A− |
| XXL | 4/5 |

According to the review aggregator Metacritic, Playboi Carti received "generally favorable reviews" based on a weighted average score of 69 out of 100 from 5 critic scores. Jon Caramanica of The New York Times called the mixtape "erratic, sometimes transfixingly so", writing that it "takes hip-hop's ad-lib era to its logical extreme — everything sounds like an ad-lib, even the main lyrics". He described tracks such as "Lookin" and "No. 9" as examples of Carti's fragmented, free-form delivery, which inverts traditional rap structure in favor of mood and texture. Pitchfork's Briana Younger shared a similar view, describing that Playboi Carti "feels like a break from life, the soundtrack to a mindless good time". Matthew Ramirez, also from Pitchfork, praised Carti for knowing when "to let the instrumental ride" and when to take command of a song, awarding the single "Magnolia" the publication's "Best New Track" distinction.

Writing for XXL, the reviewer described Playboi Carti as "a short, sweet and rather savage formal introduction" that succeeds largely through its "sonically pleasing, hypebeast swag rap". The review credited the production team—particularly Pi'erre Bourne—as "the audible MVP", highlighting how Carti's minimalist cadence turns sparse writing into a stylistic advantage. The magazine considered songs like "Magnolia" and "Dothatshit!" among the project's standouts, commending Carti's ability to make repetition sound engaging and to deliver "good vibes, an escape from reality and flexing". Brian Duricy of PopMatters was more mixed, describing the mixtape as "the sonic equivalent of the stereotypical laissez-faire worker who breezes through presentations on sheer personality alone". He viewed the project as an exercise in "aspiration minimalism", fun but lightweight compared with more introspective rap releases of the same period.

In a lukewarm review, Narshima Chintaluri of HipHopDX wrote that the tape often plays "like a glorified beat tape with ad-libs", arguing that Carti would need to "further develop his songwriting in order to maintain this allure alongside his more successful contemporaries". Even so, the review praised Pi'erre Bourne's production for giving the project a distinctive sonic identity and credited Carti's "knack for catchy songwriting" despite its simplicity.

=== Accolades ===
The mixtape appeared on 2017 year-end album lists by publications such as Fact, Pitchfork, and Tiny Mix Tapes. John Twells of Fact stated that the project "adeptly taps into a widespread youthful malaise and the genre-fluid playlist culture that has come to dominate rap's mainstream [...] Sad and restless but also party-ready, Playboi Carti doesn't need political rambling or conscious posturing to get its message across". Corrigan B of Tiny Mix Tapes wrote that "of everything that 2017 promised about rap's future, Playboi Carti felt the most like a real path forward, a crystallization of the SoundCloud underground's zeitgeist in a format built to transcend the scene's messy adolescence".

| Publication | Accolade | Rank | Ref. |
|---|---|---|---|
| Fact | The 50 best albums of 2017 | 25 | |
| Gorilla vs. Bear | Gorilla vs. Bear's Albums of 2017 | 7 | |
| Tiny Mix Tapes | 2017: Favorite 50 Music Releases | 9 | |
| Rolling Stone | 40 Best Rap Albums of 2017 | 8 | |
| Cult MTL's Mr. Wavvy | Best Music of 2017 | 9 | |
| Pitchfork | The 50 Best Albums of 2017 | 35 | |
| Pitchfork | The 200 Best Albums of the 2010s | 150 | |

== Commercial performance ==
Playboi Carti debuted at number 12 on the US Billboard 200, earning 28,000 album-equivalent units in its first week, with 7,000 coming from pure album sales. The mixtape was certified Gold by the Recording Industry Association of America (RIAA) on January 10, 2018, and Platinum on February 28, 2020. As of September 2017, the mixtape has moved over 367,000 units.

== Track listing ==
Credits adapted from the album's liner notes.

Track listing
| No. | Title | Writer(s) | Producer(s) | Length |
|---|---|---|---|---|
| 1. | "Location" | Jordan Carter; Rory Quigley; Allan Holdsworth; Rowanne Mark | Harry Fraud | 2:48 |
| 2. | "Magnolia" | Carter; Jordan Jenks | Pi'erre Bourne | 3:01 |
| 3. | "Lookin" (featuring Lil Uzi Vert) | Carter; Kendall Bailey; Symere Woods | Roark Bailey | 3:03 |
| 4. | "Wokeuplikethis" (featuring Lil Uzi Vert) | Carter; Jenks; Woods | Pi'erre Bourne | 3:55 |
| 5. | "Let It Go" | Carter; Cameron Pitts; Jenks | Pi'erre Bourne | 2:30 |
| 6. | "Half & Half" | Carter; Joshua Luellen; Kendricke Brown; Cameron Murphy | Southside; K-Major^{[a]}; Murphy Kid^{[a]} | 3:47 |
| 7. | "New Choppa" (featuring ASAP Rocky) | Carter; Ricci Riera; Rakim Mayers | Riera | 2:06 |
| 8. | "Other Shit" | Carter; Chauncey Hollis | Hit-Boy | 2:48 |
| 9. | "No. 9" | Carter; Jonathan Stewart | JStewOnTheBeat | 3:19 |
| 10. | "Dothatshit!" | Carter; Jenks | Pi'erre Bourne | 3:04 |
| 11. | "Lame Niggaz" | Carter; Jenks | Pi'erre Bourne | 2:53 |
| 12. | "Yah Mean" | Carter; Jenks | Pi'erre Bourne | 2:45 |
| 13. | "Flex" (featuring Leven Kali) | Carter; Kasim Walker; Joshua Hawkins; Leven Kali | KasimGotJuice; J. Cash Beatz | 4:00 |
| 14. | "Kelly K" | Carter; Luellen; Jacob Dutton; Eric Mercer Jr. | Southside; Jake One^{[a]} | 4:31 |
| 15. | "Had 2" | Carter; Pitts | MexikoDro | 2:19 |
| Total length: | | | | 47:00 |

Notes

- ^{^[a]} signifies an uncredited co-producer
- "Wokeuplikethis" is stylized as "wokeuplikethis*"
- "Dothatshit!" is stylized as "dothatshit!"
- "No. 9" is stylized as "NO. 9"

Sample credits

- "Location" contains samples of "Endomorph", written by Allan Holdsworth and Rowanne Mark, as performed by Holdsworth.

== Personnel ==
Credits adapted from the tape's liner notes.

Technical

- Hector Delgado – mixing (tracks 1, 7, 13), recording (tracks 7, 13)
- Frankly Kastle – mixing assistant (tracks 1, 7)
- Harry Fraud – recording (track 1)
- Tatsuya Sato – mastering (tracks 1–3, 5–15)
- Kesha Lee – mixing (tracks 2–5, 9, 10, 11, 15), recording (tracks 2, 4, 5, 9–12, 14, 15), mastering (track 4)
- Roark Bailey – recording (track 3)
- Max Lord – recording (track 6, 7)
- Finis "KY" White – mixing (tracks 6, 12, 14)
- Dan FryFe – recording assistant (track 7)
- David Kim – mixing (track 8), recording (track 8)

== Charts ==
=== Weekly charts ===
2017 weekly chart performance
| Chart (2017) | Peak position |
|---|---|
| Dutch Albums (Album Top 100) | 95 |
| Canadian Albums (Billboard) | 28 |
| US Billboard 200 | 12 |
| US Top R&B/Hip-Hop Albums (Billboard) | 7 |

2025 weekly chart performance
| Chart (2025) | Peak position |
|---|---|
| UK R&B Albums (Official Charts) | 26 |

=== Year-end charts ===
Year-end chart performance
| Chart (2017) | Position |
|---|---|
| US Billboard 200 | 62 |
| US Top R&B/Hip-Hop Albums (Billboard) | 25 |

== Certifications ==
Certifications
| Region | Certification | Certified units/sales |
|---|---|---|
| Denmark (IFPI Danmark) | Gold | 10,000^{‡} |
| Poland (ZPAV) | Gold | 10,000^{‡} |
| United Kingdom (BPI) | Silver | 60,000^{‡} |
| United States (RIAA) | Platinum | 1,000,000^{‡} |
^{‡} Sales+streaming figures based on certification alone.

== Release history ==
Release history
| Region | Date | Label(s) | Format(s) | Edition | Ref. |
|---|---|---|---|---|---|
| Various | April 14, 2017 | AWGE; Interscope | Digital download; streaming | Standard | |
| Various | October 6, 2017 | AWGE; Interscope | CD | Standard | |
| Various | November 17, 2017 | AWGE; Interscope | LP | Standard | |
| Various | April 25, 2025 | AWGE; Interscope | LP | Standard | |
