= Blacc Zacc =

American rapper (born 1990)

- Zacc 2025 mugshot after his arrest

Background information
- Born: Zachary Chapman; December 17, 1990 (age 35); Columbia, South Carolina, U.S.
- Genres: Hip hop; trap
- Occupations: Rapper
- Years active: 2010–present
- Labels: Dirty Money Entertainment; South Coast Music Group; Interscope
- Partner: Renni Rucci
- Criminal information
- Status: Incarcerated since, late 2025
- Criminal charges: Murder-for-hire, RICO,

Details
- Date apprehended: October 30, 2025
- Imprisoned at: Spartanburg County Jail, U.S.

Zachary Chapman (born December 17, 1990), known professionally as Blacc Zacc, is an American rapper from Columbia, South Carolina. He rose to prominence with his single "Make a Sale" (featuring Moneybagg Yo). He often worked with DaBaby and collaborated with artists like Stunna 4 Vegas, Young Dolph, Foogiano, LightSkinKeisha, and Renni Rucci.

== Early life ==
Chapman was born on December 17, 1990, in Columbia, South Carolina. From an early age, he developed an interest in music and wrote his first song as a child for his mother. His stepfather owned a small recording studio at their apartment, giving him an early opportunity to experiment with recording and songwriting.

== Music career ==
=== Mixtapes and early success (2010s) ===
Adopting the stage name Blacc Zacc, he began his music career in the early 2010s, releasing a series of mixtapes that helped him build a local following. Blacc Zacc released his debut mixtape, 1st Round Draft Pick, in 2010. Over the subsequent years, he consistently released new mixtapes like High-Class Trapper (2017), New Blacc City (2018), and Blacc Frost (2018). His breakthrough came with the re-release of Dirty Summer in 2018, which featured collaborations with notable artists like Kampaign, Blacko, and Ross. The mixtape’s success led to increased recognition and eventually caught the attention of major record label.

=== Signing with Interscope Records ===
In 2019, Blacc Zacc signed a deal with Interscope Records, and significantly elevated his status with the release of his 2019 single "Chump Change", progressively refining his sound. Following the signing, he released his debut studio album, Carolina Narco. In April 2020, he released his other project, 803 Legend

=== Trappin Like Zacc (2019) ===
Blacc Zacc released his sixth project titled Trappin Like Zac in 2019 after signing a deal with Interscope Records which debuted at No. 21 on Billboard's Top Heatseekers chart. The album features different rappers such as DaBaby, Stunna 4 Vegas, Key Glock, and more.

=== Carolina Narco (2020) ===
In March 2020, Blacc Zacc released his first studio album Carolina Narco. The 11-track album followed the release of his previous project, 808 Legend. The album includes guest appearances from DaBaby, Yo Gotti, Stunna 4 Vegas, and Moneybagg Yo. Its production was handled by Young Kio, OG Parker, and 808 Mafia, among others. The release of Carolina Narco was accompanied by a 17-minute cinematic short film, which premiered on March 26, 2020.

== Business ventures ==
In addition to his music career, Zacc is also an entrepreneur. He founded Dirty Money Entertainment, a record label that supports emerging artists from the Southern United States. His entrepreneurial efforts have extended beyond music, with ventures in real estate and other businesses.

== Personal life ==
Blacc Zacc is in a relationship with American rapper Renni Rucci. He announced that she was pregnant with their child. In September 2024, the couple welcomed their son. In February 2026, Zacc and Rucci announced they were expecting another child, her fourth and she confirmed that her two oldest are teens from her previous relationship. Their other son was born on July 6.

The couple faced public trouble in March 2025 when Rucci was forced to leave their home by Zacc due to suspicions of infidelity involving Kevin Gates. Rucci denied the claims and accused Zacc of infidelity. Their relationship status after the incident is still unknown.

== Legal issues ==
In late 2025, Zacc was arrested by U.S. Marshals on multiple charges, including Racketeer Influenced and Corrupt Organizations Act conspiracy, and a murder for hire plot. Prosecutors say Zacc organized the crime after a rival gang member stole a diamond chain. He has since pleaded not guilty and is currently detained at Spartanburg County Jail awaiting trial to face charges.

== Discography ==
=== Albums ===
List of mixtapes, with selected details
Title	Album details	Peak chart positions
Title	Album details	US Heat.
Trappin Like Zacc	Released: July 19, 2019; Label: Interscope; Formats: Digital download, streaming	22
Carolina Narco	Released: March 6, 2020; Label: Dirty Money Entertainment, Interscope; Formats: Digital download, streaming	—

== Filmography ==
List of television shows, showing year aired, character played and notes
Year	TV show	Role	Notes	Ref.
2021–present	Love & Hip Hop: Atlanta	Himself	Guest role (Season 10–present)	

== See also ==
- List of Love & Hip Hop: Atlanta cast members
- List of Interscope Records artists
