= The Life of Pi'erre 5 =

Studio album by Pi'erre Bourne
- Released: June 11, 2021
- Length: 60:14
- Labels: SossHouse; Interscope
- Producer: Pi'erre Bourne

Pi'erre Bourne chronology
Frazier Trill (2021)	The Life of Pi'erre 5 (2021)	47 Meters Down (2021)

Singles from The Life of Pi'erre 5
- 1. "4U" Released: April 2, 2021; 2. "Groceries" Released: May 12, 2021; 3. "Sossboy 2" Released: June 9, 2021; 4. "Drunk and Nasty" Released: September 3, 2021

The Life of Pi'erre 5 is the second studio album by American record producer and rapper Pi'erre Bourne. It was released on June 11, 2021, by SossHouse Records and Interscope Records. The album features Playboi Carti, Lil Uzi Vert, and Sharc. The album was supported by official four singles such as 4U, Groceries, Sossboy 2, & Drunk & Nasty, also to be known as the final album in The Life of Pi'erre series. The album received mixed reviews from music critics with most of its positivity on the album production, which was produced by Pi'erre Himself. The album debuted on number 35 on the US Billboard 200, Selling approximately 16,000 equivalent units in its first week and stands as his highest charting solo project since his debut studio album, The Life of Pi'erre 4 (2019).

== Background and recording ==
in an interview with Complex in April 2020, Bourne stated that he was completing work on The Life of Pi'erre 5 and that it would be the final album in the series, saying, "My initial objective for this whole series was to get Kanye [West]'s attention, and I kind of got that while I was working on TLOP4. So I'm pretty much cool with what I've accomplished with it."

A majority of the album was completed in 2019 around the release of The Life of Pi'erre 4. A number of songs on the album, including "Switching Lanes" and "Drunk and Nasty" leaked before the album released.

== Critical reception ==
Professional ratings
Review scores
Source	Rating
AllMusic	3.5/5 stars
HipHopDX	3.9/5
The Observer	3/5 stars
Pitchfork	7.2/10

Dylan Green of Pitchfork said that Bourne continues to display his talents "as a producer first and a rapper second", but that lyrically "his jokes and scene-setting are typically colorful enough to infuse each rhyme with enough personality", concluding that "Bourne's consistent tinkering brings him closer to fully reconciling both sides of his art. If Pi'erre 5 proves anything, it's that Pi'erre Bourne the producer and Pi'erre Bourne the rapper are less at odds than ever." Kadish Morris of The Observer said that the album "is saturated with his idiosyncratic earworm tricks: mid-tempo wavy beats, inebriated syncopated synths and gloomy piano arrangements" but "the repetitive drone of his robotic vocals and disjointed storytelling can make the project feel laborious".

== Track listing ==
All tracks are written and produced by Jordan Jenks (Pi'erre Bourne); "Switching Lanes" written with Jordan Carter, "Sossboy 2" written with Symere Woods, "Drunk and Nasty" written with William Burkett.

The Life of Pi'erre 5 track listing
No.	Title	Length
1.	"Intro"	1:11
2.	"Switching Lanes" (featuring Playboi Carti)	3:10
3.	"Hulu"	5:13
4.	"Couch"	4:24
5.	"42"	3:07
6.	"Biology 101"	3:08
7.	"YNS"	4:19
8.	"Sossboy 2" (featuring Lil Uzi Vert)	3:47
9.	"Practice"	4:33
10.	"40 Clip"	4:27
11.	"Retroville"	4:51
12.	"Drunk and Nasty" (featuring Sharc)	5:00
13.	"Amen"	2:59
14.	"Groceries"	3:12
15.	"Butterfly"	3:15
16.	"4U"	3:38
Total length:		60:14

== Charts ==
Chart performance for The Life of Pi'erre 5
Chart (2021)	Peak position
Belgian Albums (Ultratop Flanders)	191
Canadian Albums (Billboard)	85
Lithuanian Albums (AGATA)	88
US Billboard 200	35
US Top R&B/Hip-Hop Albums (Billboard)	17
