= The Knux =

American alternative hip hop duo

- Origin: New Orleans, Louisiana, United States
- Genres: Alternative hip hop, indie rock, pop, R&B
- Occupations: Record producers, rappers, singers, songwriters
- Years active: 2003–present
- Labels: Rebel House LLC, The Blank Factory, Cherrytree, Goliath, Interscope
- Members: Krispy; Joey
- Website: www.theknux.com

The Knux are an American alternative hip hop duo, formed in 2003, composed of brothers Kentrell "Krispy" Lindsey (formerly known as Krispy Kream) and Alvin "Joey" Lindsey (formerly known as Rah Al Millio). Both brothers are multi-instrumentalists, who sing and rap, as well as produce the bulk of their own music. Their music contains elements of rock, electronic and pop music.

The Knux are well known for their intense live shows; in 2009, they were invited to perform at almost every major music festival in North America. They have also toured with a slew of diverse artists spanning various genres, such as Common, Q-Tip, Nas, The Roots, Shwayze, Lupe Fiasco, DJ AM, Travis Barker and DJ Cobra, among other prominent artists. They released their debut album Remind Me in 3 Days..., on October 28, 2008. They released their follow-up, Eraser, on September 27, 2011.

== History ==
=== Early life and career beginnings ===
The Lindsey brothers were born and raised in New Orleans, Louisiana, by their single mother. The two brothers were initially not very close. Joey likes to describe their childhood as him being a nerd: "I was like the nerd, into video games and stuff like that, and Krispy was more like, popular and into hanging out and girls." True to their often cantankerous relationship, Krispy begs to differ: "Ah man, that's just how Joey likes to say it, but that ain't how it was. Joey was always a cool mu'fucka, it's just that we didn't fuck with each other like that."

Although they shared the same roof, and the same interest in marching band, where they honed their playing prowess, the two ran in different circles in high school. Joey cites Nas' second album It Was Written (1996) as the first rap album that he really listened to. Joey has credited the Gravediggaz second album The Pick, the Sickle and the Shovel (1997) as the album that brought them together: "I bought that tape and we'd just sit around after school listening to it all afternoon." Within a year of the two hanging out and writing rhymes, they hooked up with an uncle who was a local producer and started to create songs together. Krispy has said: "We started off calling ourselves The Knuckle Heads and we'd go over to his studio to make beats and songs." The brothers were displaced after Hurricane Katrina hit their hometown, after which the brothers relocated to Los Angeles, California.

=== Remind Me in 3 Days... (2006–2008) ===
The Knux began to gain recognition in 2007, when they were the opening act for Chicago-bred rapper Common's Finding Forever Tour. On February 19, 2008, the song "Cappuccino", was the first single by The Knux, officially released by Interscope. The song was later featured in an episode of the fourth season of the HBO original series, Entourage. The song was later featured in the stoner film, Harold & Kumar Escape from Guantanamo Bay. A music video for the "Cappuccino", was subsequently filmed. With the singles "Bang, Bang" and "Cappuccino" garnering attention, their debut album Remind Me in 3 Days..., was released in 2008. The album charted at number 23 on the U.S. Top Heatseekers.

=== Eraser (2009–2011) ===
After spending most of 2009 touring to promote their debut album, 2010 had The Knux back in the studio working on their second release. On January 2, 2010, The Knux released their debut extended play (EP), titled Fuck You. They later announced the title of their second album to be Eraser, due to them wanting to reshape their image: "With this album, we want to take those preconceived notions and shatter and erase them" said eldest brother Krispy. The album was initially to be released on June 21, 2011, but was pushed back to September. They recorded the album with Robert Orton who has handled production duties on Police and Lady Gaga albums.

On February 9, 2011, Consequence of Sound posted the song "She's So Up", which was later officially released on March 1 and serves as the album's first single. On July 12, 2011, The Knux released their second single, titled "Run", which features American recording artist Kid Cudi. Unlike their previous effort, Eraser included guest appearances from artists such as Natalia Kills, Jack Davey, Blake Miller and Kid Cudi. The album was released on September 27, 2011.

=== KTWN and Eleven (2012–present) ===
On July 27, 2012, The Knux released the first offering from their new project KTWN, a song titled "Animal". The project, KTWN, stands for the place The Knux now call home: Koreatown in downtown Los Angeles. "Animal" is the first single from KTWN with a combination of high energy rapping, singing, and guitar work. Throughout August and September the duo toured in the U.S., and revealed plans to bring the electric live show to Japan, the U.K., and Paris. On November 7, 2012 "Toke Up", the second offering from KTWN, was released. Their second EP, KTWN, was released on November 26, 2012. On April 28, 2015, The Knux released Eleven, their third studio album.

== Personal life ==
The duo currently reside in Los Angeles, California.

== Discography ==
=== Studio albums ===
List of albums, with selected chart positions
Title	Album details	Peak chart positions	
Title	Album details	US Heat	US R&B
Remind Me in 3 Days...	Released: October 28, 2008; Label: Interscope; Formats: CD, digital download	23	—
Eraser	Release: September 27, 2011; Label: Cherrytree, Interscope; Formats: CD, digital download	50	—
Eleven	Release: April 28, 2015; Label: Rebel House LLC; Formats: Digital download	—	—
"—" denotes a recording that did not chart or was not released in that territory.

=== EPs ===
List of extended plays, with selected chart positions
Title	Album details	Peak chart positions	
Title	Album details	US Heat	US R&B
Fuck You	Released: January 2, 2010; Label: Self-released; Formats: Digital download	—	—
KTWN	Release: November 26, 2012; Label: Self-released; Formats: Digital download	—	—
"—" denotes a recording that did not chart or was not released in that territory.

=== Singles ===
As lead artist

List of singles as lead artist, with selected chart positions, showing year released and album name
Title	Year	Peak chart positions			Album
Title	Year	US	US R&B	US Rap	Album
"Cappuccino"	2008	—	—	—	Remind Me in 3 Days...'
"Bang! Bang!"	2008	—	—	—	Remind Me in 3 Days...'
"F!re (Put It In the Air)"	2008	—	—	—	Remind Me in 3 Days...'
"She's So Up"	2011	—	—	—	Eraser
"Run" (featuring Kid Cudi)	2011	—	—	—	Eraser
"—" denotes a recording that did not chart or was not released in that territory.

== Production discography ==
=== B.o.B – B.o.B Presents: The Adventures of Bobby Ray (2010) ===
- 09. "Fame"
