= Remind Me in 3 Days... =

Studio album by The Knux
- Released: October 28, 2008
- Recorded: 2007–2008
- Genres: Alternative hip hop, rap rock, pop rock
- Length: 64:41
- Label: Interscope
- Producer: The Knux

The Knux chronology
Remind Me in 3 Days... (2008)	Eraser (2011)

Professional ratings
Review scores
Source	Rating
Entertainment Weekly	B
Pitchfork	6.7/10
PopMatters	4/10 stars
Prefix	8/10 stars
Rolling Stone	4/5 stars
Spin	3.5/5 stars
Vibe	4/5 stars
Robert Christgau	B−

Remind Me in 3 Days... is the debut studio album by American alternative hip hop duo the Knux, released in 2008. The album reached No. 23 on the Billboard Top Heatseekers chart. The album received generally favorable reviews, earning a score of 71 at Metacritic.

== Track listing ==
No.	Title	Length
1.	"The List"	3:44
2.	"F!re (Put It in the Air)"	4:32
3.	"Bang! Bang!"	3:21
4.	"Cappuccino"	4:00
5.	"Roxxanne"	3:33
6.	"Daddy's Little Girl"	3:45
7.	"The Train"	3:33
8.	"Shine Again"	5:40
9.	"Life in a Cage (Electric)"	4:40
10.	"Pea Knuckle skit"	1:42
11.	"Powder Room"	4:07
12.	"Parking Lot"	3:28
13.	"Hush"	3:09
14.	"Wake the Fuck Up"	3:31
15.	"Playboys"	3:48
16.	"The True"	3:52
17.	"Lights Camera Action"	5:00
