= DYLN (producer) =

American record producer and musician

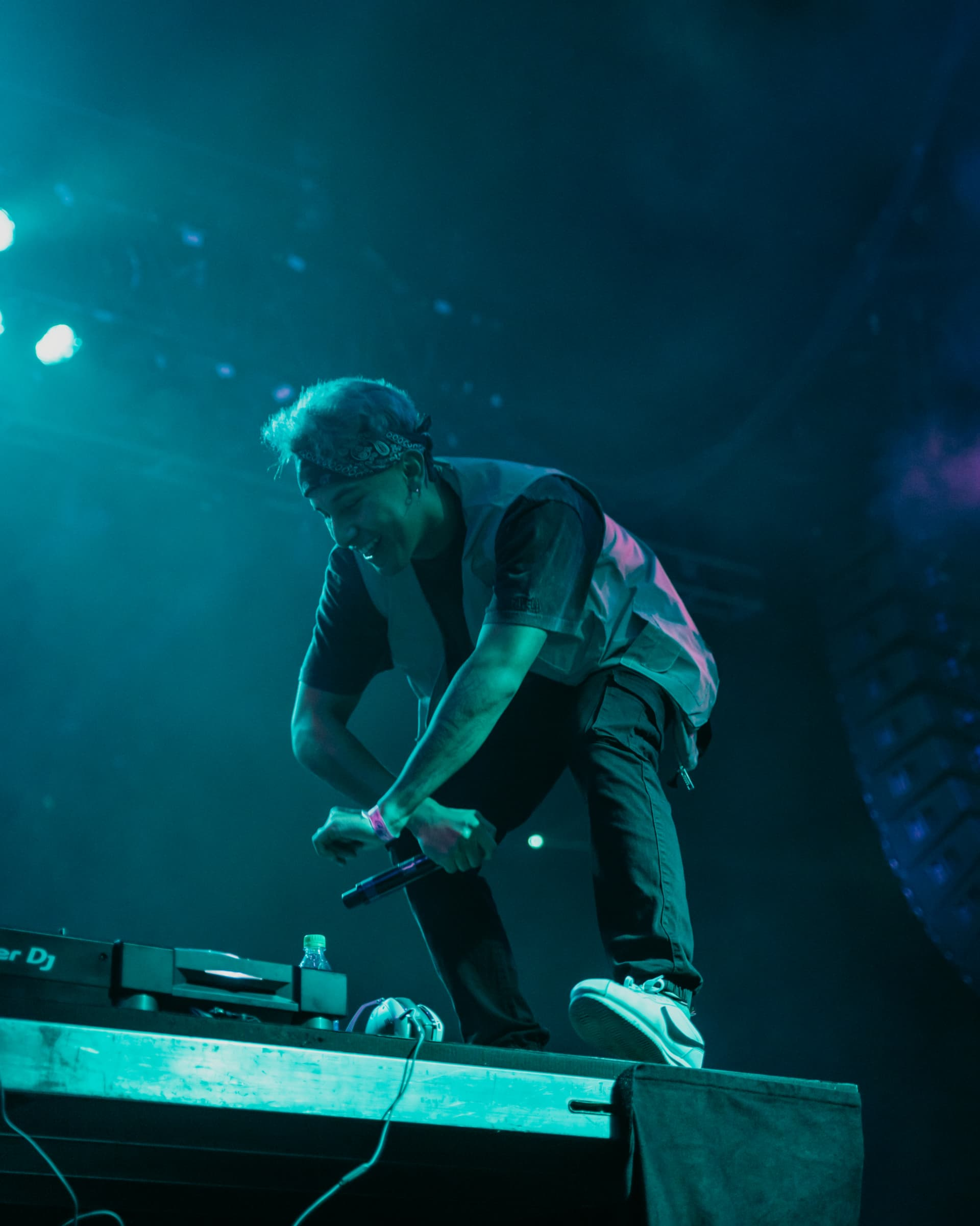
- DYLN during a performance at House of Blues Anaheim (2019)

Background information
- Origin: Los Angeles, California, U.S.
- Genres: Trap; Bass house; R&B
- Occupations: Record producer; DJ
- Instrument: Digital audio workstation
- Years active: 2017–present
- Label: Flavours LLC
- Website: dyln.world

DYLN is an American record producer and musician. He is based in Los Angeles, California.

== Career ==
DYLN attended the University of California, Riverside and began his music career on SoundCloud. In 2020, he performed for Insomniac’s Electric Daisy Carnival.

In 2021, DYLN released his first studio album BoomTown, featuring 1TakeJay, Priceless Da Roc, Rucci, DCMBR, Mari Taylor, and several other artists.

== Discography ==
Albums and extended plays

Title	Album details
BoomTown	Released: December 23, 2021; Label: Flavours LLC; Formats: Digital download

Singles

List of singles as lead artist, showing year released
Title	Year
best i ever had?	2019
Nasty (with Famous Uno)	2020
