= Wokeuplikethis =

2017 single by Playboi Carti featuring Lil Uzi Vert

Single by Playboi Carti featuring Lil Uzi Vert

from the album Playboi Carti
- Released: March 10, 2017 (SoundCloud); April 7, 2017 (official release)
- Recorded: February 14, 2017
- Studio: Means Street Studios
- Genre: Trap
- Length: 3:57
- Label: AWGE; Interscope
- Songwriters: Jordan Carter; Symere Woods; Jordan Jenks
- Producer: Pi'erre Bourne

Playboi Carti singles chronology
| "Margiela Roof" (2017) | "Wokeuplikethis" (2017) | "Sleeping With My 9" (2017) |

Lil Uzi Vert singles chronology
| "XO Tour Llif3" (2017) | "Wokeuplikethis" (2017) | "Raf" (2017) |

Music video
- "wokeuplikethis*" on YouTube

"Wokeuplikethis" (stylized wokeuplikethis*) is a song by American rapper Playboi Carti, featuring fellow American rapper Lil Uzi Vert. Written alongside producer Pi'erre Bourne, it was originally released on March 10, 2017 to SoundCloud before being official released on April 7, 2017, as the second single from Carti's eponymous debut commercial mixtape. The song interpolates the 2004 single "White Tee" by Dem Franchize Boyz.

== Release ==
The song premiered via SoundCloud on March 10, 2017, and was released on iTunes for digital download as a single on April 7, 2017.

== Composition and lyrics ==
"Wokeuplikethis" is a trap song. Carti's verses have been described as "spilling out unfinished ideas, but there's a charm to the way he dawdles through verses, as if rap is merely an afterthought." The lyrics of the song depict Carti and Lil Uzi's rise to fame and criticises smaller artists for allegedly copying their style. The intro consists of Lil Uzi repeating the phrase "I'm a rockstar" in a reference to him and Carti's fame.

== Music video ==
The song's official music video premiered exclusively on Tidal and was then later released on YouTube on August 9, 2017, with 112 million views as of August 2026. The video was directed by James "JMP" Pereira, who has directed videos such as "Look At Me" and "Moonlight" for XXXTentacion.

=== Synopsis ===
The video takes place in a prison, with the opening shot showing Carti getting a haircut shirtless by a woman in a red dress while lip syncing the lyrics on a rotary dial telephone. The rest of the video switches between shots of an exercise yard and a hallway with other prisoners imitating him.

== Usage in media ==
- The song was interpolated by Eminem for the track "Greatest" on Kamikaze.
- Beyoncé interpolated the song into her 2018 Coachella performance.
- The song was used in the video game NBA Live 18
- Lil Wayne remixed the song on his mixtape Dedication 6: Reloaded.

== Charts ==
=== Weekly charts ===
| Chart (2017) | Peak position |
|---|---|
| US Billboard Hot 100 | 76 |
| US Hot R&B/Hip-Hop Songs (Billboard) | 32 |
| US Hot Rap Songs (Billboard) | 25 |

=== Year-end charts ===
| Chart (2017) | Position |
|---|---|
| US Hot R&B/Hip-Hop Songs (Billboard) | 79 |

== Certifications ==
| Region | Certification | Certified units/sales |
|---|---|---|
| Canada (Music Canada) | Gold | 40,000^{‡} |
| Poland (ZPAV) | Gold | 25,000^{‡} |
| New Zealand (RMNZ) | Platinum | 30,000^{‡} |
| United Kingdom (BPI) | Silver | 200,000^{‡} |
| United States (RIAA) | 2× Platinum | 2,000,000^{‡} |
^{‡} Sales+streaming figures based on certification alone.
