= Pi'erre Bourne =

American record producer and rapper (born 1993)

- Pi'erre Bourne performing in Boston in 2026

Background information
- Born: Jordan Timothy Jenks; September 19, 1993 (age 33)
- Origin: Columbia, South Carolina, U.S.
- Genres: Hip hop; trap; cloud rap
- Occupations: Record producer; rapper; singer; songwriter; audio engineer
- Years active: 2010–present
- Labels: SossHouse; Interscope
- Website: yopierre.com

Jordan Timothy Jenks (born September 19, 1993), known professionally as Pi'erre Bourne (/piˈɛrˌbɔːrn/ pee-ERR BORN), is an American record producer, rapper, singer, songwriter, and audio engineer. He is known for producing the 2017 singles "Magnolia" for Playboi Carti and "Gummo" for 6ix9ine, both of which entered the top 30 of the U.S. Billboard Hot 100. He has worked extensively with artists including Playboi Carti, Lil Uzi Vert, Lil Yachty, Young Thug, Juice Wrld, Young Nudy, Trippie Redd, Kanye West, Drake, Nav, 6ix9ine, Duwap Kaine, and 21 Savage.

== Early life ==
Jenks was raised in Columbia, South Carolina. His mother is a second-generation immigrant from Belize. Growing up, he would spend his summers with his grandmother in South Jamaica, Queens, which led to his interest in East Coast hip hop. He is related to Mobile Malachi, a Belizean Kriol reggae artist and musician. He is also a cousin of Papoose. Inspired by his uncle Dwight who was a rapper and graphic artist, Jenks first began making beats when he was in elementary school, using FL Studio on his uncle's computer. His stage name was inspired by the Kenan Thompson All That sketch "Everyday French with Pierre Escargot" and the 2002 film The Bourne Identity. While in high school, he formed a rap group with his friends called The Bourne Ones and posted music on Imeem.

== Career ==
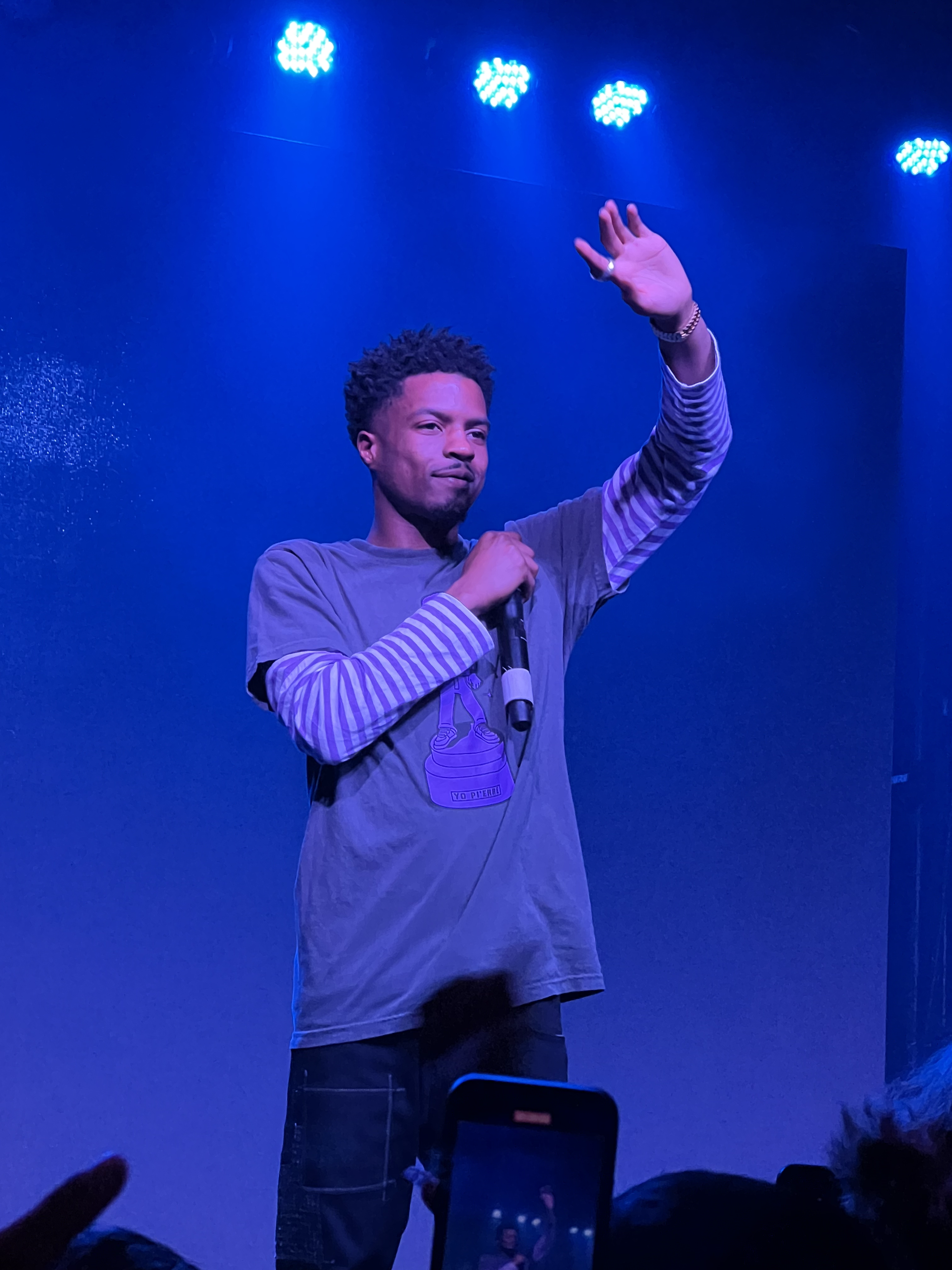
Pi'erre Bourne performing at Saint Andrew's Hall in 2022 as part of his Good Movie World Tour.

After graduating from high school, he studied graphic design at Winthrop University for a year before dropping out. He met someone named Absalom who would later become his manager. After dropping out from Winthrop, he lived with his grandparents in Queens, and then with his father in Greenville, South Carolina, working various retail jobs. At 18, his uncle encouraged him to go to school for music and Jenks moved to Atlanta to study sound engineering at the SAE Institute. Because the institute did not have dorms, Jenks lived in his Cadillac Escalade for a period of time. While in school, he met and began collaborating with DJ Burn One, who encouraged him to create his own instrumentals and not rely on samples. He also met and became close friends with TM88 and the son of L.A. Reid, a music executive at Epic Records. He interned for a week at Hustle Gang Records before working as a full-time engineer at Mad Studios in Atlanta. While working at the studio, he met frequent collaborator Young Nudy. In 2015, Jenks began working for Epic Records as a sound engineer, leaving a year later to focus on his own career. In 2016, Jenks began releasing a series of mixtapes titled The Life of Pi'erre, named after the Kanye West album The Life of Pablo.

Jenks met Playboi Carti in February 2017 after Carti recorded a demo using Jenks' "Wokeuplikethis" instrumental. He produced the Playboi Carti song "Magnolia" in March 2017, which peaked at 29 on the U.S. Billboard Hot 100. In September 2017, he signed a record deal with Interscope Records and launched his own imprint label, SossHouse. In the spring of 2018, he helped produce a number of songs on Kanye West's album Ye, but did not receive formal production credit. He produced the May 2018 Travis Scott single "Watch", featuring Kanye West and Lil Uzi Vert. Playboi Carti's album Die Lit, which Jenks executively produced, also released in May 2018. On May 8, 2019, Pi'erre Bourne and close collaborator Young Nudy released their collaborative mixtape titled Sli'merre. On June 21, 2019, he released The Life of Pi'erre 4, his debut studio album. In July 2019, Bourne worked with Kanye West on production in West's album Jesus Is King. He earned his first Grammy Award for his production work on the album at the 2021 Grammy Awards. Jenks debuted at No. 1 on Billboard's Hot 100 Producers chart on March 25, 2020, due to four production credits on the deluxe edition of Lil Uzi Vert's Eternal Atake. On June 19, 2020, Jenks released a deluxe edition of The Life of Pi'erre 4.

Jenks produced the Drake song "Pain 1993", which released in May 2020 and debuted at number 7 on the Hot 100 on May 16, 2020. Jenks released his second studio album, The Life of Pi'erre 5, on June 11, 2021. The album was entirely produced by Jenks and includes features from Lil Uzi Vert, Playboi Carti, and Sharc. Jenks produced the Lil Wayne song "Cameras", which released on January 14, 2022, in the re-release of Wayne's Sorry 4 the Wait mixtape. On September 2, 2022, he released his third studio album, Good Movie. On February 24, 2023, Jenks released "IG", which he initially teased in 2018, as an official single. The song was the first single for his Grails EP, which featured re-recordings of fan-favorite snippets and was released on April 14, 2023. On November 13, 2024, he released Sli'merre 2, his second collaborative album with Young Nudy. On June 6, 2025, Pi'erre released "Blocs", the lead single to Made in Paris, his fourth studio album. Made in Paris was released on June 27, 2025.

== Artistry ==
Jenks has cited Wiz Khalifa, video game soundtracks, Dipset, G-Unit, Kid Cudi, T-Pain, J Dilla, Pharrell Williams, Timbaland, and Kanye West as inspirations for his music. Jenks has called West's career as a rapper and a producer an influence. Alphonse Pierre of Pitchfork described Bourne's productions as "beats that pair airy video-game melodies with classic trap drums". He is well known for his producer tag, "Yo Pierre, you wanna come out here?", sampled from an episode of The Jamie Foxx Show.

== Discography ==
=== Studio albums ===
Title	Details	Peak chart positions			
Title	Details	US	US R&B/HH	US Rap	CAN
The Life of Pi'erre 4	Released: June 21, 2019; Label: SossHouse, Interscope; Format: Digital download, streaming	107	—	—	—
The Life of Pi'erre 5	Released: June 11, 2021; Label: SossHouse, Interscope; Format: LP, digital download, streaming	35	17	15	85
Good Movie	Released: September 2, 2022; Label: SossHouse, Interscope; Format: LP, digital download, streaming	—	—	—	—
Made in Paris	Released: June 27, 2025; Label: SossHouse, Interscope; Format: LP, digital download, streaming	—	—	—	—

=== Collaboration albums ===
Title	Details	Peak chart positions	
Title	Details	U.S.	U.S. R&B/HH
Pi'erre & Cardo's Wild Adventure (with Cardo)	Released: December 25, 2018; Label: Self-released; Format: Streaming	—	—
Sli'merre (with Young Nudy)	Released: May 8, 2019; Label: RCA; Format: Streaming, digital download	63	35
The Wolf of Peachtree (with Jelly)	Released: January 31, 2020; Label: Sosshouse; Format: Streaming, digital download	—	—
Chavo's World (with Chavo)	Released: November 27, 2020; Label: Sosshouse; Format: Streaming, digital download	—	—
Frazier Trill (with Frazier Trill)	Released: January 29, 2021; Label: Sosshouse; Format: Streaming, digital download	—	—
47 Meters Down (with Sharc)	Released: June 25, 2021; Label: Sosshouse; Format: Streaming, digital download	—	—
Chavo's World 2 (with Chavo)	Released: August 13, 2021; Label: Sosshouse; Format: Streaming, digital download	—	—
Yo!88 (with TM88)	Released: December 10, 2021; Label: Capitol, Interscope; Format: Streaming, digital download	—	—
Wolf of Peachtree 2 (with Jelly)	Released: May 27, 2022; Label: Sosshouse; Format: Streaming, digital download	—	—
Space Age Pimpin (with Juicy J)	Released: June 24, 2022; Label: Trippy Music; Format: Streaming, digital download	—	—
Still Trap'n (with Frazier Trill)	Released: May 5, 2023; Label: Sosshouse; Format: Streaming, digital download	—	—
Chavo's World 3 (with Chavo)	Released: May 12, 2023; Label: Sosshouse; Format: Streaming, digital download	—	—
Streetz Hottest Young'n (with J Billz)	Released: June 2, 2023; Label: Sosshouse; Format: Streaming, digital download	—	—
Born Seditionary (with Kura)	Released: June 9, 2023; Label: Sosshouse; Format: Streaming, digital download	—	—
The 5th (with Bermuda Yae)	Released: August 25, 2023; Label: Sosshouse; Format: Streaming, digital download	—	—
Sli'merre 2 (with Young Nudy)	Released: November 13, 2024; Label: RCA; Format: Streaming, digital download		
Pi'erre & Cardo's Wild Adventure 2 (with Cardo)	Scheduled: TBA; Label: SossHouse, Interscope; Format: Streaming, digital download	—	—

=== Extended plays ===
- King of the Hill, October 31, 2014, self-released
- SossGirl, February 15, 2016, self-released
- Beast Mode ++++ (with Trippie Redd), October 19, 2016, TenThousand Projects
- Grails, April 14, 2023, SossHouse, Interscope

=== Mixtapes ===
- The Bourne Identity, April 4, 2010, self-released
- The Bourne Ultimatum, June 4, 2010, self-released
- The Bourne Supremacy, August 19, 2010, self-released
- Heir To The Throne (Deluxe), January 27, 2012, self-released
- The Life of Pi'erre, September 19, 2016, self-released
- The Life of Pi'erre 2, November 25, 2016, self-released
- The Life of Pi'erre 3, December 26, 2016, self-released

=== Singles ===
List of singles as lead artist, with showing year released and album name
Title	Year	Certifications	Album
"Yo Pi'erre!" (featuring Playboi Carti)	2017		Non-album singles
"Honeyberry"	2018		Non-album singles
"Hacked My Instagram"	2018		Non-album singles
"Marie Curie"	2018		Non-album singles
"4U"	2021		The Life of Pi'erre 5
"Groceries"	2021		The Life of Pi'erre 5
"Sossboy 2" (featuring Lil Uzi Vert)	2021		The Life of Pi'erre 5
"Drunk and Nasty" (featuring Sharc)	2021	RIAA: Gold	The Life of Pi'erre 5
"Block Boy" (with TM88)	2021		Yo!88
"IG"	2023		Grails
"Honeyberry 2"	2023		Grails
"Blocs"	2025		Made In Paris
"Pop"	2025		Made In Paris

=== Other charted songs ===
Title	Year	Peak chart positions	Album
Title	Year	NZ Hot	Album
"Switching Lanes" (featuring Playboi Carti)	2021	37	The Life of Pi'erre 5

== Production discography ==
=== Charted singles ===
Title	Year	Peak chart positions					Album
Title	Year	U.S.	U.S. R&B/HH	AUS	CAN	UK	Album
"Wokeuplikethis" (Playboi Carti featuring Lil Uzi Vert)	2017	76	32	—	—	—	Playboi Carti
"Magnolia" (Playboi Carti)	2017	29	11	—	51	—	Playboi Carti
"Gummo" (6ix9ine)	2017	12	5	—	32	—	Day69
"Watch" (Travis Scott featuring Lil Uzi Vert and Kanye West)	2018	16	9	65	24	53	Non-album single
"Bad Boy" (Juice WRLD and Young Thug)	2021	22	9	55	19	31	Non-album single
"Blow for Blow" (Tee Grizzley featuring J. Cole)	2024	88	23	—	—	—	Post Traumatic

=== Other charted songs ===
Title	Year	Peak chart positions					Album
Title	Year	U.S.	U.S. R&B/HH	CAN	IRE	UK	Album
"X" (Lil Uzi Vert)	2017	81	39	—	—	—	Luv Is Rage 2
"Light It Up" (Young Thug)	2019	82	33	—	—	—	So Much Fun
"Surf" (Young Thug featuring Gunna)	2019	61	24	—	—	—	So Much Fun
"Lil Baby" (Young Thug)	2019	84	35	—	—	—	So Much Fun
"On God" (Kanye West)	2019	23	12	21	—	—	Jesus Is King
"Use This Gospel" (Kanye West featuring Clipse and Kenny G)	2019	37	20	34	—	—	Jesus Is King
"Bean (Kobe)" (Lil Uzi Vert featuring Chief Keef)	2020	19	10	60	—	—	Lil Uzi Vert vs. The World 2
"Yessirskiii" (Lil Uzi Vert featuring 21 Savage)	2020	26	14	88	—	—	Lil Uzi Vert vs. The World 2
"Wassup" (Lil Uzi Vert featuring Future)	2020	54	31	—	—	—	Lil Uzi Vert vs. The World 2
"Money Spread" (Lil Uzi Vert featuring Young Nudy)	2020	89	50	—	—	—	Lil Uzi Vert vs. The World 2
"Pain 1993" (Drake and Playboi Carti)	2020	7	6	7	15	17	Dark Lane Demo Tapes
