= The Life of Pi'erre 4 =

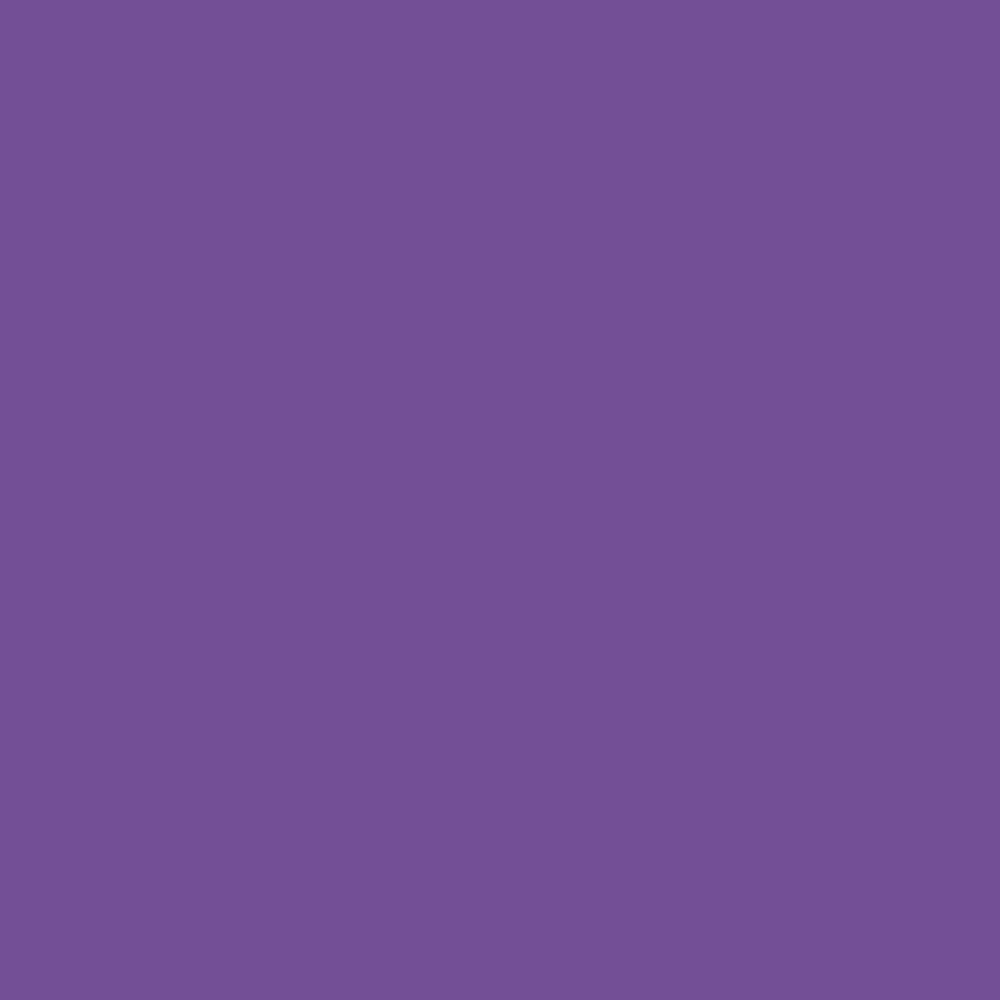

Studio album by Pi'erre Bourne
- Released: June 21, 2019 (initial); June 19, 2020 (deluxe)
- Genre: Cloud rap
- Length: 50:10; 94:05 (deluxe)
- Label: SossHouse; Interscope
- Producer: Pi'erre Bourne

Pi'erre Bourne chronology
Sli'merre (2019)	The Life of Pi'erre 4 (2019)	The Wolf of Peachtree (2020)

Deluxe edition cover

Professional ratings
Review scores
Source	Rating
The Guardian	3/5 stars
Highsnobiety	2/5
Pitchfork	6.7/10

The Life of Pi'erre 4 is the debut studio album by American record producer and rapper Pi'erre Bourne. It was released on June 21, 2019, by SossHouse Records and Interscope Records. The album debuted at number 107 on the Billboard 200 albums chart in the United States.

Almost exactly a year after the album's release, a deluxe edition was released on June 19, 2020.

== Track listing ==
All tracks written and produced by Pi'erre Bourne (Jordan Jenks), except where noted.

No.	Title	Writer(s)	Length
1.	"Poof"		3:03
2.	"Try Again"		2:27
3.	"Feds"		3:08
4.	"Be Mine"		4:18
5.	"Ballad"		3:01
6.	"Routine"		2:46
7.	"Lovers"	Jenks; Leon Huff	3:04
8.	"How High"		4:10
9.	"Romeo Must Die"		2:41
10.	"Racer"		4:55
11.	"Stereotypes"		3:08
12.	"Doublemint"		3:08
13.	"Horoscopes"		2:27
14.	"Juice"		2:23
15.	"Guillotine"		3:00
16.	"Speed Dial"		2:31
Total length:			50:10

Deluxe edition bonus tracks
No.	Title	Length
1.	"Gotta Blast"	2:06
2.	"Joe Morris"	2:09
3.	"4L"	2:28
4.	"BeBe's Kids"	3:08
5.	"Sossgirl"	3:15
6.	"Sossboy"	4:25
7.	"Deja Vu"	4:37
8.	"Purple Genes"	2:09
9.	"Conspiracy"	3:23
10.	"Motto"	4:10
11.	"Growing Pains"	2:18
12.	"Jay P"	2:24
13.	"Simon Says"	2:56
14.	"TBH"	3:23
15.	"Fortune Cookie"	3:04
Total length:		94:05

Sample credits

- "Ballad" contains an uncredited sample of "Jumblegloss", written by Stephen Malkmus and performed by Stephen Malkmus and the Jicks.
- "Lovers" contains a sample of "It's Forever", written by Leon Huff and performed by The Ebonys.

== Personnel ==
- James Kang – mixing and recording
- Tatsuya Sato – mastering

== Charts ==
Chart (2019)	Peak position
US Billboard 200	107
