= Interscope Records =

American record label

- Parent company: Universal Music Group
- Founded: September 5, 1990; 36 years ago
- Founder: Jimmy Iovine; Ted Field
- Genre: Various
- Country of origin: United States
- Location: 2220 Colorado Ave, Santa Monica, California, 90404, U.S.
- Official website: interscope.com

Interscope Records is an American record label owned by Universal Music Group. Based in Santa Monica, California, it is a division of the Interscope Capitol Labels Group.

Interscope was founded in 1990 by Jimmy Iovine and Ted Field as a $20 million joint venture with Warner Music Group's Atlantic Records. It differed from most record labels by letting A&R staff control decisions and allowing artists and producers full creative control. Interscope's first hit records arrived in under a year, and it achieved profitability in 1993. Iovine was CEO and chairman until 2014. He was succeeded by John Janick.

In 1992, Interscope acquired the exclusive rights to market and distribute releases from hardcore hip hop label Death Row Records, a decision that ultimately put the label at the center of the mid-1990s gangsta rap controversy. As a result, Time Warner, then the parent of Warner Music Group, severed ties with Interscope by selling its 50 percent stake back to Field and Iovine for $115 million in 1995. In 1996, 50% of the label was acquired for a reported $200 million by MCA Inc., which was later renamed Universal Music Group.

== History ==
=== 1990–1995: Origins, early success, and joint ventures ===
In 1989, Ted Field began to build Interscope Records as a division of his film company, Interscope Communications. To run it, he hired John McClain, who had played a central role in Janet Jackson's success at A&M Records, and Tom Whalley, who was the Capitol Records A&R director. Separately, Iovine, who had produced records for U2, Bruce Springsteen, Stevie Nicks, and John Lennon, among others, was trying to raise money to start a label. "I thought, 'Music is going to change,' " Iovine said in 1997. "'Young bands aren't going to be asking for me.' But I love working with the new thing. I always liked the part of the business that's the first time you hear something, and I knew I wasn't in that business anymore."

Iovine and Field were introduced by Paul McGuinness, then U2's manager. After a series of negotiations led by David Geffen, they came to an agreement, and in 1990, Interscope Records was founded as a joint venture with Atlantic Records. In a 1997 article in Rolling Stone, David Wild wrote: "Interscope's start-up coincided with a period of incredible change in the music world. Nirvana had ushered in the alternative revolution... While the major labels were packed with rosters full of expensive veteran artists who had to redefine themselves for a new rock era, Interscope was in the business of signing new artists and could – as Iovine puts it – 'move on a dime.'"

Based in Los Angeles, California in the Westwood neighborhood at an office building on 10900 Wilshire Boulevard, Interscope was run by "music men". It was a departure from the music industry practices of the 1970s and 1980s, when labels traditionally appointed lawyers and promotion executives to senior positions. A founding tenet of the label was that artists would have complete creative control.

Interscope's first release was "Rico Suave" by Ecuadorian rapper Gerardo in December 1990; the single reached number seven on the Billboard Hot 100 charts in April 1991. Primus' Interscope debut, Sailing the Seas of Cheese, was released in May, followed by Marky Mark and the Funky Bunch's Music for the People in July. It included the number-one single "Good Vibrations". Two days after first hearing his demo, Whalley signed Tupac Shakur in August 1991, and by November, Interscope released 2Pacalypse Now, Shakur's studio debut.

Interscope began to develop a significant presence in the genre of alternative rock in 1992. In addition to a second Primus album, the label released No Doubt's self-titled debut, Helmet's Meantime, 4 Non Blondes' Bigger, Better, Faster, More!, acquired and re-released Rocket from the Crypt's Circa: Now!, and, through a joint venture with TVT/Nothing Records, the Nine Inch Nails EP Broken. However, Interscope's success with alternative and rock music was eclipsed by controversy which began in September 1992, when Vice President Dan Quayle called on Interscope to withdraw 2Pacalypse Now, stating that it was responsible for the death of a Texas state trooper, who was shot to death in April by a suspect who allegedly was listening to the album on the tape deck of a stolen truck when he was stopped by the officer. The trooper's family filed a civil suit against Shakur and Interscope, claiming the record's violence-laden lyrics incite "imminent lawless action".

Earlier in 1992, Interscope negotiated a $10-million deal with Dr. Dre and Marion "Suge" Knight to finance and distribute their label, Death Row Records. It was initiated by McClain, who met Dre when he was recording his solo debut, The Chronic. Original plans had called for the album to be released through Sony, but Sony passed on The Chronic due to "the crazy things going on around Death Row" and the contractual status of Dr. Dre. After hearing the album, Iovine agreed to put it out, although doing so required a complicated distribution agreement with Priority Records, Dre's label as a member of N.W.A. The Chronic was released in December 1992.

By the end of the following year, The Chronic had sold almost 3 million copies. Snoop Dogg's debut Doggystyle had sold more than 800,000 copies in its first week alone, and Primus and 4 Non-Blondes had released records which hit the US Top 20. In 1993, with an estimated gross of $90 million, Interscope became profitable ahead of projections.

Interscope further established its strength in the alternative and rock genres in 1994. A $2.5 million investment to establish a joint venture with Trauma Records yielded three number-one Modern Rock tracks and a platinum-certified album with Bush's Sixteen Stone. The Nine Inch Nails album The Downward Spiral went to number two on the US charts and was widely acclaimed. Marilyn Manson's Portrait of an American Family, The Toadies album Rubberneck and Helmet's Betty were commercially successful and critically embraced.

=== 1995–2000: Gangsta rap controversy, acquisition by MCA, Aftermath and Shady ===
In May 1995, the controversy related to gangsta rap and explicit lyrics intensified as U.S. Senate Majority Leader Bob Dole accused Interscope of releasing music that glorified violence and degraded women. Among others, the label was criticized by William J. Bennett, a former Education Secretary, and C. DeLores Tucker, the chairwoman of the National Political Congress of Black Women. In September, Time Warner announced it would disassociate itself from Interscope by selling its half-interest in the company to Field and Iovine for $115 million. Ownership in Interscope was aggressively pursued by EMI, BMG, PolyGram and MCA. On December 1, 1995, the Los Angeles Times noted that with five albums on that week's pop charts and sales of $350 million over the previous three years, "what may have been a smart move politically for Time Warner is now looking like a financial fiasco." In February 1996, MCA Records—then owned by Seagram—bought 50% of Interscope for a reported $200 million. Under the agreement, Interscope retained complete creative control over the label's recordings. MCA was not required to distribute material that it deemed offensive. MCA also acquired Interscope's music publishing arm.

Dre left Death Row in mid-1996 due to what was then reported as tension over the creative direction of the label, and founded Aftermath Entertainment, a new joint venture with Interscope. In November that same year, Aftermath debuted with the album Dr. Dre Presents the Aftermath. The Death Row deal remained in place until 1997, when Knight was imprisoned for parole violations.

In November 1996, with records by Bush, Snoop Dogg, No Doubt, and Tupac Shakur, Interscope became the first label in 20 years to hold the top 4 positions on the Billboard charts. Six additional Interscope releases were in the Top 100. The label was frequently criticized for overspending on artist acquisitions and joint ventures, however, with revenue for 1996 estimated at $250 million, it operated at a profit.

In 1996, MCA Music Entertainment was renamed Universal Music Group. In 1998, the Universal Music Group parent company Seagram acquired PolyGram Records. MCA's Geffen Records and PolyGram's A&M Records were merged into Interscope, and in early 1999, Interscope Records began operating under the umbrella of Interscope Geffen A&M Records, with Iovine and Field as co-chairmen.

Iovine's assistant (and former intern) Dean Geistlinger saw Eminem perform at the Rap Olympics in Los Angeles in 1997 and passed Eminem's CD on to Iovine; Iovine, in turn, passed it on to Dre. In February 1999, Interscope and Aftermath released The Slim Shady LP. The album entered the charts at number two, and won two Grammy Awards. Later in 1999 Eminem and his manager, Paul Rosenberg, founded Shady Records.

In 1998, Interscope signed a joint-venture deal with Ruff Ryders.

By the close of the decade, Interscope sales accounted for nearly one-third of Seagram's 27% share of the U.S. music market. Records by Limp Bizkit, Eminem, Dre, Eve, Nine Inch Nails, Enrique Iglesias, Blackstreet, Smash Mouth and others generated an estimated $40 million in profit during the final six months of 1999.

=== 2000–2010: Departure of Field, DreamWorks, Cherrytree Records and Beats ===
Interscope/Shady released Eminem's The Marshall Mathers LP on May 23, 2000. The fastest-selling rap album in history, it sold 1.76 million copies in its first week. Limp Bizkit's third album, Chocolate Starfish and the Hot Dog Flavored Water, also surpassed a million in sales its first week, becoming the first rock record to do so. The same year, the label acquired the US rights to market and distribute the U2 album All That You Can't Leave Behind, beginning their relationship with U2, who Iovine had been trying to sign since 1990.

In 2001, Field resigned as co-chairman of Interscope to start a new label. Described as an amicable parting, Field said he was "anxious to become an entrepreneur again." An agreement with Universal allowed Field to resign a year before his contract was set to expire. Conversely, Whalley, Interscope's president since 1998, accepted the position of chairman of Warner Bros. Records in May 2000 and was not released from his Interscope contract until it expired in August 2001.

Interscope/Shady released The Eminem Show, in May 2002 and the soundtrack for Eminem's semi-autobiographical film 8 Mile in October; the two titles combined sold more than 11,000,000 records before the end of the year. In 2002, New York City rapper 50 Cent signed to Interscope with a $1 million advance. 50 Cent's major-label debut album Get Rich or Die Tryin' was released on February 6, 2003, through Interscope. The album debuted at number one on the Billboard 200 and the album went on to be certified 9× platinum in America. In April, it was announced that 50 Cent would sign and develop artists for release on G-Unit Records, which would be marketed and distributed through Interscope. 50 Cent's success allowed G-Unit artists to release their own projects.

In November 2003, Universal Music Group acquired DreamWorks Records and in 2004 it was merged into Interscope Geffen A&M. The DreamWorks A&R staff was retained, and the label's artists were divided between Geffen and Interscope. Among others, Interscope inherited Blink-182, The All-American Rejects, and Nelly Furtado. G-Unit artist Lloyd Banks released his debut studio album, The Hunger for More in June 2004 through Interscope. Anchored by the success of the single, On Fire, the album debuted atop the Billboard 200 and achieved platinum status by the RIAA.

In March 2005, Interscope launched Cherrytree Records with Martin Kierszenbaum, its head of international operations. Kierszenbaum, also a producer and A&R executive, focused initially on developing artists from outside the United States. Feist and Robyn were among Cherrytree's first artists.

Four of Interscope's releases were in the top 10 of the year end sales charts in 2005: The Massacre (50 Cent) at number one, Encore (Eminem) at number two, Love.Angel.Music.Baby. (Gwen Stefani) at number six, and How to Dismantle an Atomic Bomb (U2) at number eight. The Game's The Documentary appeared at number 16, and The Black Eyed Peas album Monkey Business charted at number 18.

In 2006, Dre and Iovine established Beats Electronics. Dre had been approached by his attorney to start a line of sneakers, and when he told Iovine about the idea, Iovine said: "You know speakers, not sneakers." 'Beats by Dr. Dre Studio Headphones' were introduced in January 2008 at the annual Consumer Electronics Show. "It took us two years to get them right, but when I heard I knew it was going to be big," Iovine said in 2010. "It's just like listening to a hit record." The marketing for Beats integrated endorsements from Interscope artists including Gwen Stefani, M.I.A. and Pharrell, Lady Gaga, and will.i.am.

Lady Gaga's studio debut The Fame was released in August 2008; it was re-released with eight new songs as The Fame Monster in November 2009. Interscope held the top four positions on the 2009 year-end Hot 100 charts with The Black Eyed Peas' "Boom Boom Pow" (number one) and "I Gotta Feeling" (number four); Lady Gaga's "Poker Face" charted at number two and "Just Dance" was at number three.

=== 2010–2020: Lady Gaga, Madonna, Eminem, departure of Iovine and appointment of John Janick ===
In June 2010 Eminem's Recovery entered the Billboard 200 at number one, his sixth album to do so. Born This Way by Lady Gaga was released in May 2011, and debuted at number one in 23 countries. In the US, with more than one million copies sold in its first week, it had the highest first-week album sales in five years. Four of the album's singles—"Born This Way", "Judas", "The Edge of Glory", and "You and I"—charted in the top ten of the Billboard Hot 100.

Interscope signed Madonna and Van Halen in 2011. Both artists were previously signed to Warner Bros. Records; both released their first records for Interscope in 2012.

In October 2012, John Janick was named president and COO of Interscope Geffen A&M. The founder of Fueled By Ramen, Janick had previous success with artists including Jimmy Eat World, Fall Out Boy, Panic! at the Disco and Paramore. At the time of his appointment, it was reported that Iovine had chosen Janick as his eventual successor—Iovine's attention had increasingly turned to Beats, which dominated the headphone market with 2012 revenues of $512 million. In May 2014, following Apple's acquisition of Beats, Iovine resigned. As anticipated, Janick was named chairman and CEO of Interscope Geffen A&M.

Six Interscope releases appeared in the Billboard year end album charts in 2014: The Marshall Mathers LP 2 by Eminem, Ultraviolence by Lana Del Rey, V by Maroon 5, Native from OneRepublic, Lady Gaga's ARTPOP, and Oxymoron by Schoolboy Q. In December 2014 it was announced that Selena Gomez, previously signed to Hollywood Records, had signed with Interscope.

Imagine Dragons' Smoke + Mirrors debuted on the Billboard album charts at number one in March 2015. A week later, Kendrick Lamar's album To Pimp a Butterfly appeared at number one, a position it held for two consecutive weeks. Lamar won five Grammys in 2016. In August 2017, JoJo announced she had re-signed to Interscope, in a joint venture deal to launch her own music imprint, Clover Music.

In October 2018, YG Entertainment teamed up with Interscope Records in a global partnership for Blackpink. Interscope and Universal Music Group would represent the girl group worldwide, outside of Asia.

In May 2019, Australian pop rock band 5 Seconds of Summer released their fourth studio album, Calm, their first for Interscope. The album hit number one in Australia, the UK and Scotland.

A corporate restructuring that consolidated Universal labels resulted in the creation of the Interscope Capitol Labels Group in March 2024. Janick was named CEO and chairman of the label group.

== See also ==
- Interscope Records discography
- List of record labels
