= Destroy Lonely discography =

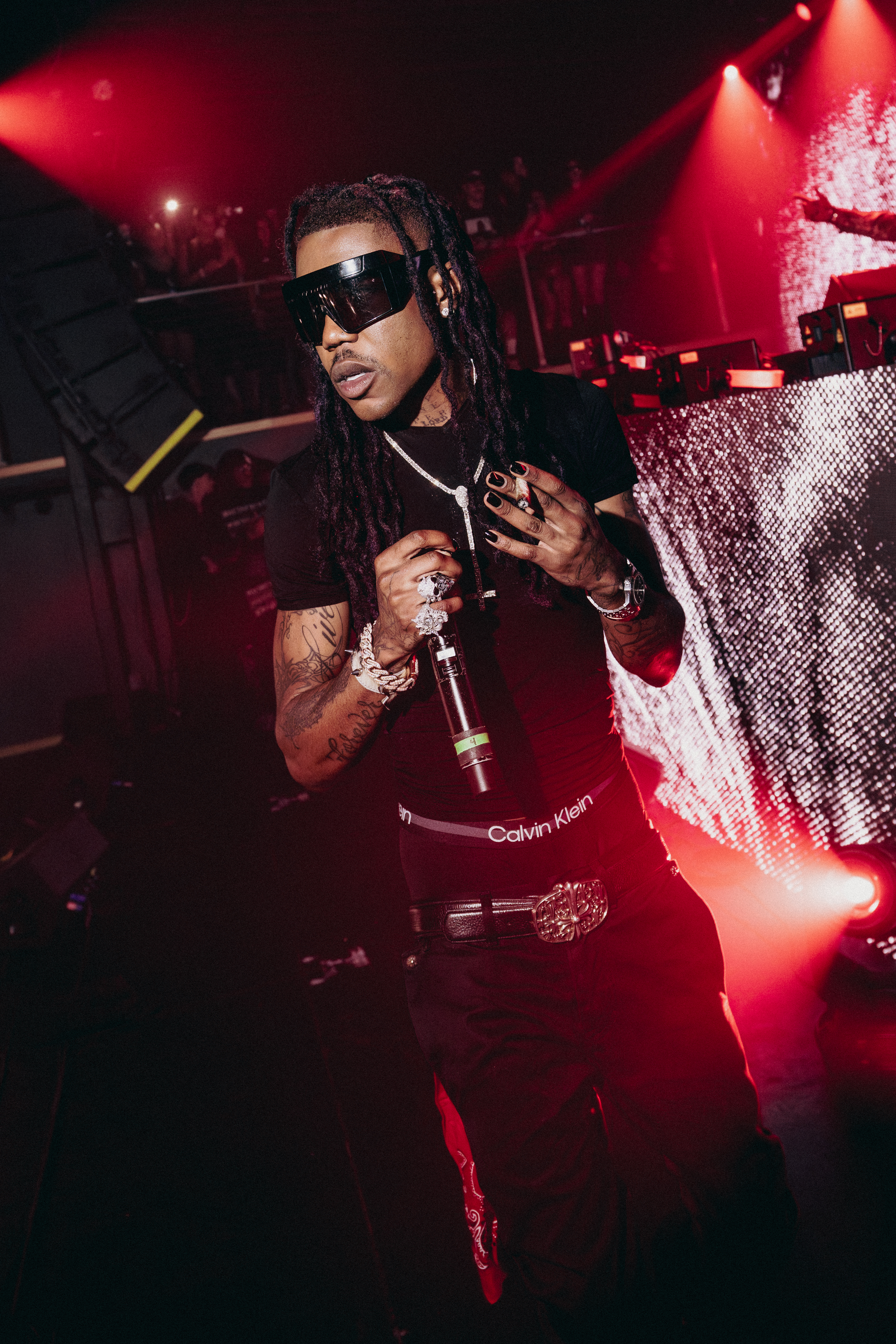
- Performing in 2026
- Studio albums: 2
- EPs: 10
- Mixtapes: 6
- Singles: 4

The American rapper Destroy Lonely has released two studio albums, six mixtapes, ten extended plays, and four singles.

== Studio albums ==
Title	Details	Peak chart positions				
Title	Details	US	US R&B/HH	BEL (FL)	CAN	LIT
If Looks Could Kill	Released: May 5, 2023; Deluxe: September 29, 2023; Labels: Opium, Interscope; Formats: Digital download, streaming, LP and CD	18	4	184	62	51
Love Lasts Forever	Released: August 30, 2024; Labels: Opium, Interscope; Format: Digital download, streaming, LP and CD	10	1	—	—	—

== Mixtapes ==
Title	Mixtape details	Peak chart positions	Certifications
Title	Mixtape details	US	Certifications
Darkhorse	Released: March 12, 2019; Label: Self-released; Format: Digital download, streaming	—	
Underworld	Released: March 6, 2020; Label: Self-released; Format: Digital download, streaming	—	
ᐸ/3	Released: September 25, 2020; Labels: Self-released; Formats: Digital download, streaming	—	
</3²	Released: October 31, 2020; Labels: Self-released; Formats: Digital download, streaming	—	
No Stylist	Released: August 12, 2022; Label: Opium, Interscope, Ingrooves; Formats: LP, digital download, streaming	91	RIAA: Gold
ᐸ/3³	Released: September 19, 2025; Label: Opium, Interscope; Formats: CD, Cassette, Digital download, streaming	64	
"—" denotes a recording that did not chart or was not released in that territory.

== Extended plays ==
Title	Extended plays details
Lonely's Flexed Up Slow Jams	Released: May 28, 2016; Labels: Self-released; Formats: Streaming (Lost)
Destroy	Released: August 9, 2017; Label: Self-released; Format: Streaming
Sometimes U Lose	Released: April 26, 2019; Labels: Self-released; Formats: Digital download, streaming
Forever, ILY	Released: August 23, 2019; Label: Self-released; Format: Digital download, streaming
Ectasy	Released: May 29, 2020; Labels: Self-released; Formats: Digital download, streaming
Lord	Released: June 26, 2020; Labels: Self-released; Formats: Digital download, streaming
Addicted to Money	Released: August 7, 2020; Labels: Self-released; Formats: Digital download, streaming
Overseas	Released: December 1, 2020; Label: Self-released; Format: Digital download, streaming
XO	Released: January 7, 2021; Labels: Self-released; Formats: Digital download, streaming
See U Soon </3	Released: June 5, 2025; Labels: Self-released; Formats: Streaming

==== Collaborative extended plays ====
Title	Extended plays details
NezzusDestroyed (with Nezzus)	Released: February 4, 2018; Labels: Self-released; Formats: Streaming
Top Floor Vampire (with Lifelessgarments)	Released: November 30, 2020; Labels: Self-released; Formats: Digital download, streaming

== Singles ==
List of singles, with selected chart positions, showing year released and album name
Title	Year	Peak chart positions			Certifications	Album
Title	Year	US Bub.	US R&B/HH	NZ Hot	Certifications	Album
"If Looks Could Kill"	2023	2	30	17	RIAA: Gold	If Looks Could Kill
"Turn Your Phone Off" (with PinkPantheress)	2023	—	—	14		Non-album single
"Luv 4 Ya"	2024	—	—	—		Love Lasts Forever
"Monster"	2026	—	—	23		Drop Dead Gorgeous

== Other charted and certified songs ==
List of other charted and certified songs, showing year released and album name
Title	Year	Peak chart positions			Certifications	Album
Title	Year	US Bub.	US R&B/HH	NZ Hot	Certifications	Album
"No Stylist"	2022	—	—	—	RIAA: Platinum	No Stylist
"Never Ever"	2022	—	—	—	RIAA: Gold	NS+ (Ultra)
"How U Feel?"	2023	—	47	—	RIAA: Gold	If Looks Could Kill
"Singapore" (Ken Carson featuring Destroy Lonely)	2023	9	—	31		A Great Chaos
"Paranoid" (Ken Carson featuring Destroy Lonely)	2023	15	—	29	RIAA: Gold	A Great Chaos
"Love Hurts" (featuring Lil Uzi Vert)	2024	—	50	—		Love Lasts Forever
"Off the Meter" (with Ken Carson and Playboi Carti)	2025	11	26	13		More Chaos
