= If Looks Could Kill =

If Looks Could Kill may refer to:

== Film and television ==
- If Looks Could Kill (1986 film)
- If Looks Could Kill (film), a 1991 action comedy spy film
- If Looks Could Kill (1996 film), a 1996 television movie starring Antonio Sabato Jr.; see List of films based on television programs
- "If Looks Could Kill", a 1993 episode of the Canadian TV series Forever Knight
- "If Looks Could Kill", a 2006 episode of the American TV series CSI: Miami

== Music ==
=== Albums ===
- If Looks Could Kill (Destroy Lonely album), 2023
- If Looks Could Kill (Jim French album), by Jim French with Diamanda Galás and Henry Kaiser, 1979
- If Looks Could Kill, I'd Watch You Die, by Death by Stereo, 1999

=== Songs ===
- "If Looks Could Kill" (Destroy Lonely song), 2023
- "If Looks Could Kill" (Heart song), 1986
- "If Looks Could Kill" (Rodney Crowell song), 1989
- "If Looks Could Kill" (Timomatic song), 2012
- "If Looks Could Kill" (Transvision Vamp song), 1991
- "If Looks Could Kill", by Camera Obscura from Let's Get Out of This Country, 2006
- "If Looks Could Kill", by Player from Spies of Life, 1981
