= President (Southside song) =

2024 single by Southside

Single by Southside
- Released: April 26, 2024
- Genre: Hip-hop
- Length: 3:07
- Label: Epic; Platinum; Grammar Publishing
- Songwriters: Joshua Howard Luellen; Kenyatta Lee Frazier Jr.; Bobby Wardell Sandimanie III; Jalan Anthony Lowe; Kylian Emmanuel Kante
- Producers: Joshua Howard Luellen; Jalan Anthony Lowe; 1kyl; Mulhiir

Southside singles chronology
"Gimme Da Lite" (2023)	"President" (2024)	"Elegant" (2024)

"President" is a song by American record producer Southside, featuring Opium members and rappers Ken Carson and Destroy Lonely. It was released on April 26, 2024, as the third single from his forthcoming album. It was followed the release of singles "Gimme da Lite" with Lil Yachty and "Hold That Heat" featuring Travis Scott.

== Background and release ==
"President" serves as the second release following Carson's "Overseas", and Lonely's "Potato Loaded", with Quavo. Before the release, Southside took to his Instagram account to preview a session of him in the studio listening to the song.

== Composition and lyrics ==
Zachary Horvath for HotNewHipHop praised the song's synths, horns, and bass, but criticized Carson and Lonely's mumble rap throughout the track. Elaina Bernstein of Hypebeast wrote on how "President" sees the Opium duo "alternate autotune-drenched verses throughout the three-minute track."

Lyrically, the track is a flex anthem by both rappers, with Ken referencing how he is surrounded by "15 black trucks" like he's the president, and flexing how he spent wads of money throughout his day. While on Lonely's verse, he raps about recreational drug abuse; shouting out Carson, referring him to X-Man, which is one of Carson's nicknames.
