= No Stylist =

No Stylist may refer to:

- "No Stylist" (song), a song by Moroccan-American rapper French Montana (2018)
- No Stylist (mixtape), a mixtape by American rapper Destroy Lonely (2022), or the title track
