= Teen X (EP) =

- Standard cover (Note: The deluxe edition cover features the same image but with inverted colors)

EP by Ken Carson
- Released: August 14, 2020
- Recorded: 2020
- Genres: rage; hip-hop
- Length: 11:53
- Producers: Juberlee; Richie Souf; Roark Bailey; Star boy; Outtatown

Ken Carson chronology
Boy Barbie (2020)	Teen X (2020)	Project X (2021)

Teen X is the second extended play (EP), by American rapper Ken Carson. It was self-released on August 14, 2020, and it was independently distributed through digital downloads and streaming. It serves as Carson's breakthrough EP since it spawned Carson's first major hit, "Yale".

== Background and release ==
In 2019, Carson signed to Playboi Carti's Opium record label. Upon signing, he released his debut extended play, titled Boy Barbie. Shortly after the release of Boy Barbie, Carson released Teen X on August 14, 2020. A deluxe edition of the EP, titled Teen X: Relapsed, was released on January 2, 2021.

== Composition ==
Teen X is a rage EP. Compared to his previous project, it features messier vocals and darker instrumentals courtesy of Roark Bailey, Juberlee, Richie Souf, Starboy, and Outtatown, with the latter two handling the majority of the production.

On the track "Yale", it features "urgent synths" and "offhanded flows".

== Reception ==
A writer from Revolt wrote that "Yale" introduced listeners to Carson's unfiltered lyrics, high-energy beats, and experimental sound. In a ranking of Carson's 20 best songs, "Yale" was ranked at number two, with Mariah Rivera of Complex calling it a "banger" of a track, she also wrote how the Carson's unfiltered lyricism combined with Starboy and Outtatown's production on the track makes "Yale" an essential song for the rage rap era of music. In October 2023, three years following the release of "Yale", it was certified gold by the RIAA, and in May 2026, it was certified silver by the British Phonographic Industry.

== Track listing ==
All tracks are written by Ken Carson

Teen X full track listing
No.	Title	Writer(s)	Producer(s)	Length
1.	"Teen X"	Kenyatta B. Frazier Jr.; Kendall Roark Bailey; Jeffrey Lawrence Shannon	Roark Bailey; Juberlee	2:01
2.	"Yale"	Frazier; Anton Mendo; Tobias Dekker	Star boy; Outtatown	1:46
3.	"Meds"	Frazier; Mendo; Dekker	Star boy; Outtatown	2:32
4.	"Why"	Frazier; Mendo	Star boy	1:45
5.	"For Her"	Frazier; Tony Son	Richie Souf	2:10
6.	"Pissed Off"	Frazier; Mendo; Dekker	Star boy; Outtatown	1:40
Total length:				11:53

Teen X: Relapsed (deluxe edition) track listing
No.	Title	Writer(s)	Producer(s)	Length
7.	"Teen X Babe"	Frazier; Bailey; Shannon	Roark Bailey; Juberlee	1:56
8.	"Teenager Rager"	Frazier; Mendo; Dekker	Outtatown; Starboy	1:44
9.	"Butterfly"	Frazier; Anton Mendo; Tobias Dekker; Jung Yean Cho	Starboy; Outtatown; Art Dealer	2:24
10.	"High as Shit"	Frazier; Mendo; Dekker	Starboy; Outtatown	2:32
11.	"On the Low"	Frazier; Mendo; Dekker; Jalan Lowe	Starboy; Outtatown; Lil 88	1:17
Total length:				8:57

=== Notes ===
- "High As Shit" is stylized as "High as Sh!T"

== Personnel ==
- Benjamin Lidsky - mixing
- Max Lord - mixing
- Actual Hate - artwork
