= Overseas (Ken Carson song) =

2024 single by Ken Carson

Single by Ken Carson

from the album A Great Chaos (Deluxe)
- Released: April 12, 2024
- Genre: Hip-hop
- Length: 2:21
- Label: Opium; Interscope
- Songwriters: Kenyatta Lee Frazier Jr.; Pierre Thevenot; Ștefan Cișmigiu; Nick Spiders; Oliver Brown
- Producers: Esko; Lucian; Lukrative; Nick Spiders

Ken Carson singles chronology
"I Need U" (2023)	"Overseas" (2024)	"President" (2024)

Music video
- "Overseas" on YouTube

"Overseas" is a song by the American rapper Ken Carson. It was released by Opium and Interscope Records on April 12, 2024, as the lead single from the deluxe edition of his third studio album, A Great Chaos (2023). Carson wrote it alongside the song's producers, Esko, Lucian, Lukrative, and Nick Spiders. After Carson was sent the song's instrumental, he found affinity with it and developed an idea for the song. The single's cover art was inspired by Heath Ledger's depiction of the Joker in the 2008 film The Dark Knight. Carson included "Overseas" in the set list of the Chaos World Tour (2024).

"Overseas" is a hip-hop song driven by a buzzing beat, 808-heavy production, and a subtle melody. Its lyrics see Carson offer an update on his recent life, which he mostly spent on tour, and reflecting on his rise to prominence. Praised by critics for its rhythm and catchiness, the song debuted at number 79 on the Billboard Hot 100, marking Carson's first entry on the chart, and charted in New Zealand and Canada. In August 2025, "Overseas" was certified Platinum by the Recording Industry Association of America (RIAA). Gunner Stahl directed the song's music video, which included grainy clips of Carson's live performances in Europe.

== Background and release ==
The American rapper Ken Carson released his third studio album, A Great Chaos, on October 13, 2023, through Opium and Interscope Records. It was positively received by critics; several publications featured it on their year-end lists of the best albums from 2023. (Note: Namely, The Washington Post, Slant Magazine, Complex, Rolling Stone, and Paste.) "Overseas" was released on April 12, 2024, as the lead single for the deluxe edition of A Great Chaos. It was released one day ahead of his debut Coachella performance. Lucian, who produced the song alongside Esko, Lukrative, and Nick Spiders, told XXL that Carson immediately connected to its instrumental, devised an idea and was ready to record vocals for it before he and the other producers were aware. The artwork depicts scars on Carson's face; it was inspired by Heath Ledger's character Joker in the 2008 film The Dark Knight. A week after the release of the deluxe edition on July 5, 2024, Carson commenced his Chaos World Tour, which ran until November; he included "Overseas" as a part of its set list.

== Composition and lyrics ==
"Overseas"
The hook of "Overseas", showcasing its 808-heavy production, Carson's frenzied flow, and discussion of European cities.

"Overseas" is 2 minutes and 21 seconds long. Carson wrote the song with Esko, Lucian, Lukrative, and Nick Spiders. It was recorded by Corey Moon, with Benjamin Lidsky handling mixing and Colin Leonard handling mastering. It is a hip-hop song driven by an "electric" beat, 808-heavy production, and a subtle melody. According to HotNewHipHop's Elias Andrews, the song sees Carson offer his audience an update on his recent life, which he mostly spent on tour. He mentions the European cities London, Paris, and Amsterdam, a reference to the first three stops of the Chaos World Tour. These lines are followed by lyrics discussing women and boasting to his enemies. He also reflects on his rise to prominence and what he would tell his younger self if he could: "I wish I could go back in time to tell myself, 'You gon' be rich'". Andrews called Carson's flow "frantic", "aggressive", and "inflected".

== Reception ==
For HotNewHipHop, Andrews felt Carson's flow and "vivid rhymes" were able give the track a distinctive approach; he also called the single's cover art "gruesome". Complex's Joshua Espinoza called the song "catchy", while Hypebeast's Elaina Bernstein said the track "finds [Carson] in his zone". Preezy Brown of Vibe considered it a standout from the deluxe edition of A Great Chaos, writing that it "garner[s] a favorable approval rating". Rolling Stone included the track in their weekly "Songs You Need to Know" list and XXL added it in their list of the week's best new hip-hop songs. Grant Rindner of the latter magazine called the track "a fitting introduction to the world of Ken Carson". In 2026, Complex listed "Overseas" as Carson's greatest song, calling it a crossover anthem and praising its hook.

"Overseas" was Carson's first song to enter the Billboard Hot 100. It peaked at number 79 on the chart dated April 27, 2024. In its opening week, it earned 6.9 million streams in the United States. On Billboard's Hot R&B/Hip-Hop Songs, the track debuted at number 34. It peaked at number 13 on Recorded Music NZ's New Zealand Hot Singles chart dated April 19. On the Canadian Hot 100, it peaked at number 93 on the chart dated April 27. The song was certified Platinum in the United States by the Recording Industry Association of America (RIAA) on August 28, 2025.

== Music video ==
Gunner Stahl directed the visually distorted music video, which premiered just over a year after the release of A Great Chaos. Henock Sileshi and Nick Holiday, formerly of the hip-hop group Brockhampton, assisted in the video's post-production. The video begins with an epilepsy warning and contains grainy visuals of clips from Carson's performances in London, Paris, and Amsterdam. Logan Fairbrother of Hypebeast said the video showcases "the strong tempo of the track matched by gritty visuals" and described the video as "chaotic".

== Charts ==
Chart performance for "Overseas"
Chart (2024)	Peak position
Canada (Canadian Hot 100)	93
New Zealand Hot Singles (RMNZ)	13
US Billboard Hot 100	79
US Hot R&B/Hip-Hop Songs (Billboard)	34

== Certifications ==
Certifications for "Overseas"
Region	Certification	Certified units/sales
United States (RIAA)	Platinum	1,000,000^{‡}
^{‡} Sales+streaming figures based on certification alone.
