= Jonathan Simmons =

Jonathan Simmons may refer to:

- Gunner Stahl (born Jonathan Simmons), American photographer
- J. K. Simmons (born 1955), American actor

== See also ==
- Jonathon Simmons (born 1989), American professional basketball player
