= How U Feel =

How U Feel may refer to:

- "How U Feel", a song by Snakehips
- "How U Feel", a song from Huncho Jack, Jack Huncho by Travis Scott and Quavo
- "How U Feel?", a song from If Looks Could Kill by Destroy Lonely
