= Yale (song) =

2020 song by Ken Carson

Song by Ken Carson

from the EP Teen X
- Released: August 14, 2020
- Genre: Rage
- Length: 1:46
- Label: Opium
- Songwriters: Kenyatta Frazier Jr.; Tobias Dekker; Anton Martin Mendo
- Producers: Outtatown; Starboy

Music video
- "Yale" on YouTube

"Yale" is a track by American rapper Ken Carson from his second EP Teen X. Released on August 14, 2020, it serves as Carson's breakout single when it began going viral across social media platforms. As of August 2026, "Yale" is one of Carson's most streamed songs of all time.

== Composition ==
"Yale" is a one-minute-and-46-second song. Carson co-wrote the song with Outtatown and Starboy, who handled the music production for the track, with Ben Lidsky handling the mixing. Sonically, the track is spearheaded by "urgent synths" and "offhanded flows".

== Reception ==
A writer from Revolt wrote that "Yale" introduced listeners to Carson's unfiltered lyrics, high-energy beats, and experimental sound. In a ranking of Carson's 20 best songs, "Yale" was ranked at number two, with Mariah Rivera of Complex calling it a "banger" of a track, she also wrote how the Carson's unfiltered lyricism combined with Starboy and Outtatown's production on the track makes "Yale" an essential song for the rage rap era of music. In October of 2023, three years following the release of "Yale", it was certified gold by the RIAA, and in May of 2026, it was certified silver by the British Phonographic Industry.

== Personnel ==
Credits and personnel adapted from Apple Music.

Musicians

- Kenyatta Frazier Jr. – vocals
- Outtatown - production
- Starboy - production

Technical

- Ben Lidsky – mixing

== Certifications ==
Certifications for "Yale"
Region	Certification	Certified units/sales
United Kingdom (BPI)	Silver	200,000^{‡}
United States (RIAA)	Gold	500,000^{‡}
^{‡} Sales+streaming figures based on certification alone.
