= Clayco =

American producer

- Also known as: Kory P Beats; Kory PClaycoCookinUp
- Born: Corey Kerr; September 2 Atlanta, Georgia
- Occupation: Record producer
- Member of: Underworld Online

Corey Kerr (born September 2), known professionally as Clayco, is an American record producer from Atlanta, Georgia. He is best known for his production for Destroy Lonely, Ken Carson, and Playboi Carti, among others. He founded the Internet collective Underworld Online in 2022, and in 2023, XXL Magazine named him one of the best producers in hip-hop.

Kerr's music has been labeled as "dark", "glitchy", "immersive", and "sinister"-like by music journalists. Critics praised his production style and noted how Kerr's style allowed him to flourish within the 2020s hip-hop scene of music.

== Early life ==
Kerr was born in Atlanta, Georgia and grew up in nearby Clayton County, Georgia, where he got his rap name. Growing up, Kerr was surrounded by music, with his parents playing music from genres such as R&B and rap. Kerr stated how he listened to Nas, Jadakiss, Kanye West, and Michael Jackson. Kerr also played the trombone. Outside of music, Kerr identified himself as a "big gamer" growing up, he was inspired by his uncle and played a lot of fantasy games such as Kingdom of Hearts, Devil May Cry, Soul Calibur.

== Career ==
Clayco began his production career in 2015 after he helped his mother produce beats for her since she was a singer. He began honing those skills through countless hours of studying people on YouTube who produced music just like him. Clayco began working with Destroy Lonely in 2019, where he would email Lonely his beats, from there, the two began building a strong relationship between reach other, spurring the two to frequently work together. In 2022, Kerr, along with s.sort and Carter helped with the production of Lonely's track, "If Looks Could Kill" off of his self-titled album. In November 2022, he founded his collective, Underworld Online. On their year-end list, XXL Magazine labeled Clayco as one of the best hip hop producers of 2023. In August 2024, Clayco helped produced tracks off of Lonely's second studio album Love Lasts Forever. In March 2025, he helped with the production of Playboi Carti's track, "OPM BABI" off of his album, Music. In September 2025, Clayco helped with the music production on Lonely's sixth commercial mixtape ᐸ/3³.

== Production style ==
Rolling Stone stated that Clayco and his collective "strike a balance between the sinister beats of early Three 6 Mafia and the melodic drama of The Cure."
