= Project X (Ken Carson album) =

Studio album by Ken Carson
- Released: July 23, 2021
- Studios: Interscope (Santa Monica); Record Plant (Los Angeles)
- Genres: Rage; pop-trap
- Length: 27:12
- Label: Opium
- Producers: Star Boy; Outtatown; Bart How; BryceUnknwn; DT; Dynox; Fallwood; KP Beatz; Lil 88; Loesoe; Rok; Y2tnb

Ken Carson chronology
Teen X: Relapsed (2021)	Project X (2021)	X (2022)

Project X is the debut studio album by the American rapper Ken Carson, released on July 23, 2021, by Opium. Primarily produced by Star Boy and Outtatown, it is a rage and pop-trap album featuring harmonious synthesizers and melodic, fast-paced flows. Its title and cover artwork pay tribute to the Nima Nourizadeh film Project X (2012). Project X received mixed reviews from critics, who praised the production but criticized its songwriting as repetitive and derivative. It nevertheless proved popular amongst rage music fans and helped solidify Carson's place in the rap music scene.

== Background and release ==
In 2019, Ken Carson signed to Playboi Carti's Opium record label. The following year, Carson released his first two extended plays, Boy Barbie and Teen X; the latter spawned his first major hit, "Yale". He also garnered recognition for his work on "Beno!" from Carti's second album, Whole Lotta Red (2020). In 2021, Carson released three further EPs—Lost Files, Teen X: Relapsed, and Lost Files 2—as well as a music video for "Butterfly" (from Teen X) and the single "Patrick Ewing" featuring Lil Tecca. On July 11, 2021, Carson announced his debut album, Project X, and released it on July 23. Carson recorded the album in one or two weeks at Interscope Studios; "Til I Die" was recorded at the Record Plant in Los Angeles. Its title and cover artwork pay tribute to the Nima Nourizadeh film Project X (2012). Music videos for "Change", "Rock n Roll", and "Run + Ran" were released thereafter.

== Composition ==
Project X is a rage and pop-trap album featuring harmonious synthesizers, percussive Auto-Tuned vocals, and energetic, vocoder-heavy melodies. The album was primarily produced by Star Boy and Outtatown, who both worked with Carson on Teen X. Pitchfork's Mano Sundaresan called Carson's delivery "rapid-fire" yet "chill" when compared with Carti's performances on Whole Lotta Red. Likewise, HipHopDX reviewer Vivian Medithi felt that Carson's distinguished himself with his "fast-paced, words-running-together flow". Although Carson said he did not listen to rap or R&B music and listed the All-American Rejects and Blink-182 as inspirations in interviews, Sundaresan felt the album's songwriting and vocals leaned more towards "online rap scenes" such as plugg.

The opening track "Who's Next" incorporates switched-up flows from Carson and was compared to Carti's 2018 song "Long Time (Intro)" by Medithi. "Rock n Roll" features groovy, psychedelic and percussive synths and sees Carson rap apathetically about being under the influence of drugs. Medithi compared "Party All Day" to "Beno!" and highlighted the lyric "Shawty suckin my dick up like a Juul" as an example of its "memorable lines". "Change" is driven by arpeggiated, harmoinous synths and "muttered" verses from Carson, whilst "Run + Ran" progresses from a piano intro into "gelatinous" 808 drums and sonic melodics reminiscient of Pi'erre Bourne, according to Medithi. "Shake" and "Hella" both revolve around one-word choruses. Medithi compared the former song to Rae Sremmurd and Juicy J's 2018 single "Powerglide". He highlighted the latter and "Clutch" for their combination of heavy, knocking beats and Carson's staccato flows. Yannik Gölz of laut.de compared "Till I Die" to "Rock n Roll" with its "overstimulated and numb" nature and highlighted Carson's use of raspier flows on "Burnin Up". The final track "So What" sees Carson detail the thrill of a one-night stand.

== Critical reception ==
Professional ratings
Review scores
Source	Rating
HipHopDX	3.5/5
laut.de	4/5 stars
Pitchfork	6.0/10

Project X was released to mixed reviews from critics. Pitchfork's Sundaresan said the "lazy" nature of the album's songwriting became more apparent as it went on and accused Carson of "trying to emulate Carti's chaos or Lil Uzi Vert's velocity" on songs like "Shake" and "Hella", which he found repetitive. Despite this, he felt the album partly succeeded in providing a "sweeter, less scorched and serrated" approach to the rage sound of Whole Lotta Red. HipHopDX's Medithi highlighted Carson's sense of melody and the album's production and felt that "when Project X succeeds, Ken's music feels as kinetic and hedonistic as the movie the album is named after." However, he thought Carson appeared "boxed in by expectations" of being signed to Carti's record label and criticized his monotonous delivery. Gölz of laut.de said its sound was "fairly monochromatic", but "honed to just the right level" to highlight Carson's strengths. (Note: Quotes are translated from the original text: "recht monochromatisches [...] perfekt auf den Punkt gestutzt wurde")

Despite its mixed reception, Project X proved popular amongst rage music fans and helped solidify Carson's place in the rap music scene. Anthony Malone of HipHopDX stated that the album "quickly [accumulated] a massive following" and made Carson "a marquee figure in rage culture". David Crone of AllMusic said the album "pushed Carson's template into the rap zeitgeist almost overnight, with his bass-heavy and feverish style finding viral success on online platforms." John Norris of VMan credited it with placing Carson "at the vanguard of new Atlanta rap". "Rock n Roll" and "Run + Ran" have been described as highlights from the album by music critics, with Norris calling both tracks Carson's signature songs. On July 22, 2026, "Rock n Roll" was certified Platinum by the Recording Industry Association of America (RIAA).

== Track listing ==
Credits adapted from Apple Music.

Project X track listing
No.	Title	Writer(s)	Producer(s)	Length
1.	"Who's Next"	Kenyatta Frazier Jr.; Cas van der Heijden	Loesoe	1:45
2.	"Rock n Roll"	Frazier; Anton Mendo; Tobias Dekker; Jalan Lowe	Star Boy; Outtatown; Lil 88	2:31
3.	"Party All Day"	Frazier; Mendo; Dekker	Star Boy; Outtatown	2:16
4.	"Change"	Frazier; Mendo; Dekker; Lowe	Star Boy; Outtatown; Lil 88	2:41
5.	"Run + Ran"	Frazier; Mendo; Dekker	Star Boy; Outtatown	4:04
6.	"Shake"	Frazier; Mendo; Dekker	Star Boy; Outtatown	2:06
7.	"Hella"	Frazier; Mendo; Dekker; Bart van Hoewijk	Star Boy; Outtatown; Bart How	2:41
8.	"Clutch"	Frazier; Rok Curkovic; Jacco Troost	Rok; Fallwood	2:11
9.	"Till I Die"	Frazier; Dekker; Lowe	Outtatown; Lil 88	2:09
10.	"Burnin Up"	Frazier; Bryce Frizell; Travis Nelson Barker; Brodie Fallon; Dorien Theus	BryceUnknwn; Y2tnb; Dynox; DT	2:35
11.	"So What"	Frazier; Curkovic; Kenneth Pannu	Rok; KP Beatz	2:13
Total length:				27:12

== Personnel ==
- Benjamin Lidsky - recording (3–11), mixing
- Colin Leonard - mastering

== Charts ==
=== Weekly charts ===
Chart (2021)	Peak position
US Heatseekers Albums (Billboard)	18

Chart (2026)	Peak position
US Top Album Sales (Billboard)	31
