= Nick Holiday =

Stylist and graphic designer

- Born: Nick Lenzini; June 16, 1995 (age 31); St. Louis, Missouri
- Occupations: Art director; stylist; graphic designer
- Years active: 2015–present
- Member of: Brockhampton

Nick Lenzini (born June 16, 1995), also known as Nick Holiday, is an American art director, stylist and graphic designer. He is best known as the stylist for the music collective Brockhampton, and his eponymous clothing brand Holiday.

== Early life ==
Growing up in St. Louis, Missouri, Lenzini spent time in a fashion boutique in Missouri where his mother worked. Lenzini took to studying streetwear brands at the store SwedLife.

== Career ==
=== Brockhampton ===
Lenzini met Kevin Abstract through Twitter in 2015. He ran the merch booth during the early Kevin Abstract international tour runs.

Lenzini directed wardrobe and costume design for each Brockhampton editorial and tour, with the exception of the Iridescence era. Under lead designer Henock "HK'' Sileshi, Lenzini assisted with overall creative and merchandise designs.

=== Holiday brand ===
In 2017, Lenzini started the clothing brand Holiday. Holiday releases new collections on American holidays.

Holiday brand's most popular item is a royal blue cap that features both the New York Yankees and Los Angeles Dodgers logos. After a cease and desist letter from the MLB, the production of the NY*LA cap was halted in early September 2021.

Previous collaborators include photographer Gunner Stahl and Brockhampton.

=== Video Store Apparel ===
Video Store Apparel is a record label and clothing brand founded by Kevin Abstract and Romil Hemnani. Lenzini assists as art director for the brand, which aims to evoke feelings of 2000's nostalgia.

=== Styling jobs ===
As Kevin Abstract's personal stylist, Lezini has worked on his projects including an editorial for i-D and cover for Kinfolk.

=== Freelance jobs ===
In 2019, Lenzini designed merchandise for Shia LaBeouf’s theater company, Slauson R.C. Theater School.

In 2020, Lenzini contributed to merchandise designs for Omar Apollo’s Apolonio album.

In 2021, Lenzini led the creative direction for Aminé’s TWOPOINTFIVE release, including the album cover design and merchandise.
