= ᐸ/3³ =

2025 mixtape by Destroy Lonely

Mixtape by Destroy Lonely
- Released: September 19, 2025
- Length: 51:45
- Labels: Opium; Interscope
- Producers: Branden Akinyele; BBS; Bhristo; Bobby Raps; Brazy; Bugz Ronin; Cade; Clayco; Crystals; Cxdy; Darkboy; Dim Crux; Flybwoy; Jasper Harris; Hexotag; Icedmn; Kayv; Kwes; Wallis Lane; Leadbluntt; Leiso; Lil 88; Gabe Lucas; Mondelli; Playinwith5; Rafmade; Saintracks; Aaron Shadrow; Texaco Cam; Tre; Wakeupp; Whyeighteen; Whysobored

Destroy Lonely chronology
Love Lasts Forever (2024)	ᐸ/3³ (2025)	Drop Dead Gorgeous (2026)

Singles from Broken Hearts 3
- 1. "Jumanji" Released: September 12, 2025

ᐸ/3³ (pronounced Broken Hearts 3) is the sixth mixtape by the American rapper Destroy Lonely. It was released through Opium and Interscope Records on September 19, 2025. The mixtape serves as a sequel to his third mixtape, ᐸ/3 (2020), and its deluxe edition, ᐸ/3² (2020). It serves as a follow-up to his second studio album, Love Lasts Forever (2024). The mixtape was preceded by the lead single, "Jumanji", on September 12, 2025. Opium labelmate Ken Carson makes the album's sole guest appearance on the track "Open It Up".

== Background and promotion ==
At the 2024 Rolling Loud festival in Miami, Destroy Lonely stated that he was preparing a mixtape rather than an album, describing the project as a return to an earlier style of recording.

On June 5, 2025, he released his ninth extended play (EP), See U Soon </3, on SoundCloud. The EP included five tracks, among them a collaboration with Ken Carson titled "SRTBBL". In an interview with Clash published on April 8, 2025, Lonely said that the forthcoming mixtape was intended to focus on his existing fanbase and to highlight work developed with longtime collaborators. He described the project as more personal and less polished than his studio albums.

On September 11, 2025, Lonely released the lead single "Jumanji". A music video accompanied the release. The following day, he announced that the mixtape would be issued on September 19, 2025.

== Composition ==
Broken Hearts 3 is a mixtape that blends "booming bass, swirling melodies, and oscillating flows".

== Track listing ==
No.	Title	Writer(s)	Producers	Length
1.	"Aint Hard"	Bobby Sandimanie III; Branden Akinyele; Bridger Nelson; Daniel Perez	Akinyele; Bugz Ronin; Kwes; Wakeupp	3:15
2.	"Risk"	Sandimanie; Akinyele; Perez; Jacques Richard	Akinyele; Bugz Ronin; Darkboy	3:00
3.	"See No Evil"	Sandimanie; Akinyele; Cody Rounds; Vergovsky Stanislavovich; Abilov Vadimovich	Akinyele; Cxdy; Hexotag; Whysobored	2:22
4.	"No Pressure"	Sandimanie; Akinyele; Yurii Koshlach; Rounds; Ellantre Williams	Akinyele; Cxdy; Playinwith5; Tre; Icedmn	2:18
5.	"STFU"	Sandimanie; Perez; Robert Richardson	Bobby Raps; Bugz Ronin	3:21
6.	"Show U How"	Sandimanie; Michael Mondelli Jr.; Nelson; Perez; Williams	Bugz Ronin; Mondelli; Playinwith5; Tre; Wakeupp	2:08
7.	"Top Flo"	Sandimanie; Kyle Casabonne; Jude Fidel; Corey Kerr	Clayco; Flybwoy; Leadbluntt	2:38
8.	"Kansas"	Sandimanie; Akinyele; Koshlach; German Morozov; Rounds	BBS; Akinyele; Cxdy; Icedmn	2:34
9.	"Screwed Up"	Sandimanie; Akinyele; Venheruk Kostiantyn; Arsenii Melnyk; Rounds	Akinyele; Cxdy; Kayv; Saintracks	2:33
10.	"Party N Get High (Interlude)"	Sandimanie; Juan Botero; Gabe Lucas; Perez	Bugz Ronin; Dim Crux; Lucas	3:33
11.	"Leash"	Sandimanie; Derek Anderson; Perez	206derek; Bugz Ronin	2:29
12.	"Jumanji"	Sandimanie; Akinyele; Cade Blodgett; Jasper Harris; Jeryn Peters; Aaron Shadrow	Shadrow; Akinyele; Cade; Harris; Nova	2:17
13.	"Not the Mayor"	Sandimanie; Rounds; Melnyk; Vadym Trukhnov	Cxdy; Saintracks; Whyeighteen	2:25
14.	"Blowin Smoke"	Sandimanie; Addison Rineer; Rounds	Cxdy; Rafmade	2:16
15.	"Kool on Ya"	Sandimanie; Corey Kerr; Jalan Lowe; Cameron Stovall Jr.; Mekhi Wilber	Clayco; Crystals; Texaco Cam; Lil 88	3:23
16.	"Soooo High"	Sandimanie; Koshlach; Melnyk; German Morozov; Rounds; Oleksandr Soviak	BBS; Brazy; Cxdy; Icedmn; Saintracks	3:51
17.	"Open It Up" (featuring Ken Carson)	Sandimanie; Kenyatta Frazier; Perez; Arthur Werther; Wilber	Bugz Ronin; Crystals; Leiso	4:22
18.	"Leave U Out 2 Dry"	Sandimanie; Akinyele; Nima Jahanbin; Paimon Jahanbin; Perez; Christopher Quillin	Bhristo; Akinyele; Bugz Ronin; Wallis Lane	3:00
Total length:				51:45

Deluxe edition
No.	Title	Length
8.	"Whats It Gon Take?"	2:39
Total length:		54:24

=== Note ===
- All track titles are stylized in lowercase.

== Charts ==
Chart performance for Broken Hearts 3
Chart (2025)	Peak position
Australian Hip Hop/R&B Albums (ARIA)	25
Portuguese Albums (AFP)	167
Swiss Albums (Schweizer Hitparade)	47
US Billboard 200	64
