= Love Lasts Forever (album) =

Studio album by Destroy Lonely
- Released: August 30, 2024
- Recorded: 2023–2024
- Genre: Hip-hop
- Length: 56:17
- Labels: Opium; Interscope
- Producers: AM; Cade; Carlton; Clayco; Cloud; Crystals; Cxdy; Cxsper; D. Rich; Dylxn; Evertime; FnZ; Henney Major; JahDaGod; Jonah; KP; Lil 88; MaxFlames; Evan Moitoso; Moon; Outtatown; Ratchett; Rewined; Ron; Saintracks; Semsi; Skai; Nick Spiders; T99; Taurus; Texaco Cam; Theo; Toom; Chris Townsend; Velveteen; Wasa; Wheezy; Wooshy; Xz; Yugen

Destroy Lonely chronology
If Looks Could Kill (2023)	Love Lasts Forever (2024)	ᐸ/3³ (2025)

Singles from Love Lasts Forever
- 1. "Luv 4 Ya" Released: June 14, 2024

Professional ratings
Review scores
Source	Rating
AllMusic	3/5 stars
HotNewHipHop	"Meh"
Pitchfork	4.5/10
Slant Magazine	2.5/5 stars

Love Lasts Forever is the second studio album by American rapper and singer Destroy Lonely. It was released through Opium and Interscope Records on August 30, 2024. The album serves as a follow-up to his debut studio album, If Looks Could Kill (2023). Supported by the single "Luv 4 Ya", it features guest appearances from Lil Uzi Vert and Ken Carson; CD versions additionally feature Don Toliver. Production was primarily handled by Lil 88, who produced the entire album, alongside Wheezy, Cxdy, Dylxn, Yugen, and Outtatown, among others.

== Title ==
The album was initially going to be titled Love Last Forever, but was changed when the artwork and producer credits were officially unveiled. The pretitle "Black America Presents" was also briefly considered.

== Commercial performance ==
Love Lasts Forever earned 37,500 album-equivalent units in its first week, debuting at number 1 and number 10 on the US Top R&B/Hip-Hop Albums chart and US Billboard 200, respectively. It became his first album to chart on the US Top R&B/Hip-Hop Albums chart. The song "Love Hurts" peaked at number 50 on the US Hot R&B/Hip-Hop Songs.

== Track listing ==
Love Lasts Forever track listing
No.	Title	Writer(s)	Producers	Length
1.	"Forever"	Bobby Sandimanie III; Dylan Jansen; Jalan Lowe; Karl Gordon; Shaznay Lewis; Thant Tayzar	Lil 88; Dylxn; Yugen	3:44
2.	"Love Hurts" (featuring Lil Uzi Vert)	Sandimanie; Jansen; Lowe; Symere Bysil Woods; Tayzar	Lil 88; Dylxn; Yugen	4:34
3.	"Luv 4 Ya"	Sandimanie; Eeti Erätuli; Lowe; Vladimir Grishin	Lil 88; Evertime; Henney Major	3:32
4.	"Crystal Clear"	Sandimanie; Aaron Raj Tanarasoo; Corey Moon; Lowe; Theo Staykoff	Lil 88; Cloud & Moon; Staykoff	3:38
5.	"Baby Money"	Sandimanie; Lowe; Kenneth Pannu; Max Rafael; Semsi Salvino	Lil 88; KP; Semsi; MaxFlames	2:51
6.	"Say That"	Sandimanie; Corey Kerr; Lowe; Mehki Wilber; Tayzar	Lil 88; Clayco; Yugen; Crystals	1:59
7.	"Pimp Talk"	Sandimanie; Clemens Wardin; Lowe; Maximilian Huschke	Lil 88; Wooshy	2:23
8.	"Cadillac"	Sandimanie; Ademofe Abiodun; Amon Hill; Isaac de Boni; Lowe; Jonah Abraham; Pannu; Michael Mulé	Lil 88; KP; Jonah; FnZ	2:25
9.	"Syrup Sippin"	Sandimanie; Cade Phillip Blodgett; Giuseppe Vasaturo; Lowe; Marian Pfaff; Thomas Herrick	Lil 88; Cade; T99; Wasa; Toom	3:10
10.	"Lock In"	Sandimanie; Kerr; Lowe; John M. Weir; Tayzar; Grishin	Lil 88; Clayco; Henney Major; Yugen; Velveteen	2:27
11.	"Doubt It"	Sandimanie; Kerr; Lowe; Weir; Nick Spiders	Lil 88; Clayco; Spiders; Velveteen	2:41
12.	"Wish You Well"	Sandimanie; Tanarasoo; Lowe; Wesley Tyler Glass	Lil 88; Wheezy; Cloud	2:41
13.	"Ship Her Off"	Sandimanie; Arsenii Melnyk; Cody Rounds; Lowe; Pannu	Lil 88; Saintracks; KP; Cxdy	2:18
14.	"Honestly"	Sandimanie; Christopher Townsend; Dwayne Richardson; Lowe	Lil 88; D. Rich; Xz	3:15
15.	"Take A Trip"	Sandimanie; Lowe; Ronald Henry; Tobias Dekker	Lil 88; Outtatown; Ron	3:39
16.	"Extra High"	Sandimanie; Brian Campi; Blodgett; Jansen; Lowe	Lil 88; Dylxn; Cade; Casper	3:27
17.	"Amerika"	Sandimanie; Evan Moitoso; Lowe	Lil 88; Moitoso	3:11
18.	"Thrill" (featuring Ken Carson)	Sandimanie; Jansen; Lowe; Johnny Peng; Kenyatta Frazier Jr.	Lil 88; Dylxn; Skai	4:12
Total length:				56:17

Standard edition bonus tracks
No.	Title	Writer(s)	Producer(s)	Length
19.	"About Money"	Sandimanie; Kerr; Lowe; Spiders	Lil 88; Clayco; Spiders	2:30
20.	"No Worries"	Sandimanie; Lowe; Jarvis Adams Jr.; Taurus Bucy Currie Jr.	Lil 88; JahDaGod; Taurus	3:08
21.	"Pass Me the Keys"	Arman Andican; Sandimanie; Carlton McDowell; Lowe; Reece Weinberg	Lil 88; AM; Rewinded; Carlton	2:53
Total length:				64:47

CD edition bonus track
No.	Title	Writer(s)	Producers	Length
5.	"Bangaz" (featuring Don Toliver)	Sandimanie; Caleb Toliver; Daniel Perez; Arthur Werther; Derek Anderson	Bugz Ronin; Leiso; 206Derek	3:41
Total length:				64:16

Love Lasts Forever V2 digital deluxe additional track listing
No.	Title	Writer(s)	Producers	Length
22.	"The Bounce"	Sandimanie; Bryce Frizzell; Blodgett; Christian Baello; Gian Baba; Louie Baello	BryceUnknwn; Y2tnb; Cade; XGiannii; Ginseng; Neverdie	2:17
23.	"Make a Sound"	Sandimanie; Blodgett; Koloniec Ivanovich	Cade; Alex Chevz	2:13
24.	"See You Tomorrow"	Sandimanie; Alessio Iacomini; Blodgett; Baba; Thomas Herrick	Cade; XGiannii; Toom; Allen Core	2:12
25.	"Meet the Boss"	Sandimanie; Vladimir Grishin	Henney Major	2:30
26.	"Bling"	Sandimanie; Lowe; Evan Moltoso	Lil 88; Moltoso	2:36
Total length:				76:35

Love Lasts Forever V2.5 digital deluxe additional track listing (Note: The version of V2.5 released on streaming platforms combines both the V2 and V2.5 tracks.)
No.	Title	Writer(s)	Producers	Length
22.	"Smoking"	Sandimanie; Anh Tran; Blodgett; C. Baello; Jude Fidel; Ryan Jacob Holland	Ginseng; Cade; Ryanjacob; Leadbluntt; Anh	2:21
23.	"Healing"	Sandimanie; Blodgett; Baba; Fidel; Matvei Shalnev; Vladislav Estashev	Cade; XGiannii; OMGZanoza; Leadbluntt; Minzo2k	3:23
24.	"Forgot My Name"	Sandimanie; Blodgett; Caleb Lodish; Baba; Fidel	Cade; XGiannii; Leadbluntt; Lodish	2:20
25.	"LSD"	Sandimanie; Amir Mohammad Ghonoodi; Kerr; Eric Seay; Samuel Ritter	Clayco; SJR; 23Slaughter; Y3Rip	2:21
26.	"Money Anthem"	Sandimanie; Kerr; Jaka Aditya; Kole Kaufman	Clayco; Jxker; XDKole	3:02
Total length:				78:14

Love Lasts Forever: Presented by Blakamerika additional track listing
No.	Title	Writer(s)	Producers	Length
4.	"Get Right"	Sandimanie; Lowe; Currie; Tayzar	Lil 88; Taurus; Yugen	2:42
23.	"Prettiest One"	Sandimanie; Lowe; Dekker	Lil 88; Outtatown	2:16
Total length:				69:45

Notes

- All songs are stylized in all caps, for example, "Forever" is written as "FOREVER".
- An alternate version of the album is available on streaming platforms, omitting "Thrill".

Sample credits

- "Forever" contains a sample of the All Saints song "Love Lasts Forever", written by Shaznay Lewis, Melanie Blatt and Karl Gordon, and performed by.
- "Love Hurts" samples an earlier Destroy Lonely song, "Mud".
- "Cadillac" contains a sample of the Mofe song "Prince of Egypt", written by Ademofe Abiodun and Amon Hill.

== Personnel ==
- Destroy Lonely – vocals
- Ellantre "Tre5" Williams – mixing, engineering
- Travis Louis – mastering
- Argenis "Trilla" Peguero – engineering on "Love Hurts"
- Ben Lidsky – engineering on "About Money"
- Bigga Rankin – additional vocals on "Syrup Sippin"
- FBG Goat – additional vocals on "No Worries"

== Charts ==
=== Weekly charts ===
Weekly chart performance for Love Lasts Forever
Chart (2024)	Peak position
Austrian Albums (Ö3 Austria)	51
Swiss Albums (Schweizer Hitparade)	17
US Billboard 200	10
US Top R&B/Hip-Hop Albums (Billboard)	1

=== Year-end charts ===
Year-end chart performance for Love Lasts Forever
Chart (2024)	Position
US Top R&B/Hip-Hop Albums (Billboard)	97
