= If Looks Could Kill (Destroy Lonely song) =

Single by Destroy Lonely

from the album If Looks Could Kill
- Released: March 3, 2023
- Recorded: October 2022
- Genre: Rap rock
- Length: 3:14
- Label: Opium; Interscope
- Songwriters: Bobby Wardell Sandimanie III; Corey Kerr; Thomas Ross; Carter Bryson
- Producers: Clayco; Ssor.t; Carter

Destroy Lonely singles chronology
"20Yrs Old" (2022)	"If Looks Could Kill" (2023)	"Turn Your Phone Off" (2023)

Music video
- "If Looks Could Kill" on YouTube

Audio sample
- Sample of Lonely's verse off the track.: file; help

"If Looks Could Kill" (stylized in all lowercase) is a song by American rapper Destroy Lonely. It was released on March 3, 2023, through Opium and Interscope Records, as the lead single from his debut studio album of the same name. Lonely recorded the song in October 2022 with producers Clayco, Ssor.t and Carter, and credited it with establishing the album's direction. A departure from Lonely's rage sound, "If Looks Could Kill" features rock, emo, and pop-punk-influenced production with moody guitars and hazy vocals. Over a three-chord riff, Lonely proclaims himself a "fashion demon" and juxtaposes lyrics about fashion and violence whilst discussing his expanding wealth, evolving fashion tastes, and personal demons.

Prior to its official release, an early version of "If Looks Could Kill" was leaked and began circulating on TikTok, where it garnered over 75 million views and 200,000 streams. The song peaked at number 2 on Billboard's Bubbling Under Hot 100 Singles chart and number 30 on the Hot R&B/Hip-Hop Songs chart, and also charted in New Zealand and Lithuania. In August 2024, it was certified Gold by the Recording Industry Association of America (RIAA). An accompanying music video, directed by James Pereira, features Lonely leading a group of emotionless villagers toward individuality and creative freedom.

== Background and release ==
On August 12, 2022, Destroy Lonely released his fifth mixtape, No Stylist. Following its release, he traveled to New York City to begin recording material for a new album. He recorded If Looks Could Kill over the course of a month and a half, working primarily with producers Clayco, Ssor.t and Carter, and engineer Ellantre "Trey" Williams. Lonely recorded the album's title track in October 2022, whilst wearing a halloween mask and smoking. Ssor.t cited the song as a highlight from the If Looks Could Kill recording sessions, recalling that Lonely replayed it throughout the night after finishing it. Lonely credited the song with establishing the direction of the album; Ssor.t believes that it was made the title track as it captured its "grungy, distorted, eerie aesthetic".

"If Looks Could Kill" was released as the lead single from If Looks Could Kill on March 3, 2023, with Lonely also performing the song live that same day at Rolling Loud in California. Several months prior, an early version of the song was leaked and began circulating on TikTok, where it garnered over 75 million views and 200,000 streams. The single's cover artwork was created by Stunmic, from a photograph by Maxime Ballesteros. A music video for the song, directed by James Pereira (JMP), was released on May 26, 2023. The video portrays Destroy Lonely leading a group of emotionless villagers toward individuality and creative freedom. The song was also featured in was the soundtrack for the 2023 video game NBA 2K24.

== Composition and lyrics ==
"If Looks Could Kill" runs for three minutes and fourteen seconds. Lonely co-wrote the song with Clayco, Ssor.t, and Carter, who produced it; Williams handled mixing and engineering, whilst Bill Jabr and Travis Louis handled mastering. A departure from Lonely's rage sound, the song's production incorporates rock, emo, and pop-punk influences, and moody, "menacing" guitars. XXL described the production as enmeshing Lonely's vocals "in a hazy cloud". Over a three-chord riff, Lonely proclaims himself a "fashion demon" and juxtaposes lyrics about fashion and violence whilst discussing his expanding wealth and personal demons. He name-drops the luxury brands Chrome Hearts, Balenciaga, and Chanel, and says he no longer shops at Dover Street Market, which Eric Skelton of Complex viewed as referencing his "evolving fashion tastes". Jewel Wicker of Alternative Press called the song's closing lyric, "If looks could kill, that makes every day Halloween", a "blood-soaked statement".

== Reception ==
XXL included "If Looks Could Kill" in its list of the 13 best hip hop songs of the week of its release. Jon Powell of Revolt deemed the song a highlight from If Looks Could Kill, calling it "a perfect entry point for those unfamiliar with Lonely's style". Alexander Cole of HotNewHipHop praised the song's "incredible sound" and catchy lyrics. Complex ranked the song at number 29 on its mid-year list of the best songs of 2023, with Skelton stating that Lonely had "deliver[ed] something that would make his idol Chino Moreno proud." In 2026, the publication listed the song as the second-best in his discography.

Prior to its official release, "If Looks Could Kill" reached number 11 on the SoundCloud U.S. chart for all genres owing to multiple fan uploads. Upon its official release, the song peaked at number 2 on the Billboard Bubbling Under Hot 100 Singles chart, and number 30 on the US Hot R&B/Hip-Hop Songs chart. It also charted at number 78 on the Lithuania singles chart, and number 17 on the New Zealand Hot Singles chart. On August 27, 2024, the song was certified Gold by the Recording Industry Association of America (RIAA).

== Charts ==
Chart performance for "If Looks Could Kill"
Chart (2023)	Peak position
Lithuania (AGATA)	78
New Zealand Hot Singles (RMNZ)	17
US Bubbling Under Hot 100 Singles (Billboard)	2
US Hot R&B/Hip-Hop Songs (Billboard)	30

== Certifications ==
Certifications for "If Looks Could Kill"
Region	Certification	Certified units/sales
Poland (ZPAV)	Gold	25,000^{‡}
United States (RIAA)	Gold	500,000^{‡}
^{‡} Sales+streaming figures based on certification alone.
