= No Stylist (mixtape) =

Mixtape by Destroy Lonely
- Released: August 12, 2022
- Recorded: 2020–2022
- Genres: Hip-hop; trap; rage
- Length: 50:44
- Labels: Opium; Interscope; Ingrooves
- Producers: AM; BryceUnknwn; Cade; Carson Beats; Chef9thegod; Clayco; Cxdy; DJ Moon; Epreme; Farsight; Gunboi; Jonah Abraham; KP Beatz; Lil 88; Lucian; ProllyIan; T8ko; TM88; Xdkole; Y2tnb; Y3rip; Zodiac

Destroy Lonely chronology
XO (2021)	No Stylist (2022)	If Looks Could Kill (2023)

NS+ (Ultra) cover art
- Artwork for the deluxe edition

No Stylist (stylized in all caps) is the fifth mixtape and first commercial release by American rapper Destroy Lonely. It was surprise released through Opium, Ingrooves and Interscope Records on August 12, 2022. The mixtape features a single guest appearance from Opium labelmate Ken Carson. Production was handled by Cxdy, Lil 88, TM88, Y2tnb, among others. It is a follow-up to his third extended play XO (2021). The deluxe version titled NS+ (Ultra) was released three months later, on November 18, 2022.

No Stylist received mixed reviews from music critics. The album entered at number 91 on the Billboard 200.

== Critical reception ==
Professional ratings
Review scores
Source	Rating
AllMusic	1.5/5 stars
SheeshMedia	3.5/5 stars

AllMusic gave the mixtape 1.5 out of 5 stars and criticized that "The resulting project isn't devoid of quality, but it is devoid of feeling. A sharper pen game and some personal tales might give the project some much-needed personality, but for now, it does little to differentiate Lone." He also picked "Turnin Up" ("A camera-flash masterwork of bouncing synths") and the airy "Crystal Castles" the best tracks of the mixtape.

Ian Hassan from SheeshMedia stated: "This entire album is hypnotizing, and I can't wait to hear it at shows. This is one of the more energetic projects to release this year, and I can't wait to see how he continues to innovate his music to new levels."

Anthony Fantano of TheNeedleDrop gave the mixtape a harshly negative review, criticizing Lonely's heavy reliance on Auto-Tune and describing his vocal delivery as "boring" and lacking distinctiveness. Fantano argued that the project fails to offer any "energetic, catchy, or sticky" moments, calling its overall tone "middle of the road" and "rancid." He singled out the track "Bergdorf" as having one of the "worst flows or energies on a mellow trap song," and further criticized the repetitiveness and weak lyricism found on songs such as "NOSTYLIST." Following his criticism, Fantano gave the album a one out of ten, making it one of the worst ratings that he's given out to any project.

== Commercial performance ==
In the United States, No Stylist album entered at number 91 on the Billboard 200. In November 2026, it was certified Gold by the Recording Industry Association of America (RIAA).

== Track listing ==
No Stylist track listing
No.	Title	Writer(s)	Producer(s)	Length
1.	"Jet Lagged"	Bobby Sandimanie III; Matthew Testerman	ProllyIan; Zodiac	1:56
2.	"Bergdorf"	Sandimanie; Kole Samuel	Xdkole	2:25
3.	"<3 My Gang"	Sandimanie; Kenneth Pannu; Jonah Abraham	KP Beatz; Abraham	1:57
4.	"Vetements Coat"	Sandimanie; Bryan Simmons; Corey Moon	TM88; DJ Moon	2:00
5.	"No Stylist"	Sandimanie; Cody Rounds; Gonçalo Brás	Cxdy; Chef9thegod	3:00
6.	"Fake Niggas"	Sandimanie; Ștefan Cișmigiu; Arman Andican	Lucian; AM	3:00
7.	"Soarin"	Sandimanie; Samuel	Xdkole	2:17
8.	"Turnin Up"	Sandimanie; Rounds; Brás	Cxdy; Chef9thegod	3:10
9.	"Lonely"	Sandimanie; Corey Kerr; Tchakalla Romeo	Clayco; Gunboi; Carson Beats	2:15
10.	"Pressure"	Sandimanie; Kerr; Romeo	Clayco; Gunboi; Carson Beats	2:17
11.	"On the Table"	Sandimanie; Kerr	Clayco; ProllyIan	2:34
12.	"Swag Skool"	Sandimanie; Kerr	Clayco	2:54
13.	"Crystal Castles"	Sandimanie; Kerr	Clayco	2:47
14.	"Dangerous"	Sandimanie; Kerr; Samuel	Clayco; Xdkole	3:10
15.	"Make It Stop"	Sandimanie; Kerr; Samuel	Clayco; Xdkole	2:33
16.	"On the Floor"	Sandimanie; Kerr	Clayco; Y3rip	3:10
17.	"Pass Around"	Sandimanie; Kerr	Clayco; T8ko	2:30
18.	"OTW"	Sandimanie; Kerr; Cyrus Spurlock	Clayco; Farsight	3:44
19.	"Veteran" (featuring Ken Carson)	Sandimanie; Kenyatta Frazier Jr.; Jalan Anthony Lowe; Pannu; Erik Cordova	Lil 88; KP Beatz; Epreme	2:56

NS+ (Ultra) [deluxe edition] track listing
No.	Title	Writer(s)	Producer(s)	Length
20.	"Blitz"	Sandimanie; Kerr; Bryce Frizell; Travis Nelson Barker	Clayco; BryceUnknwn; Y2tnb	2:23
21.	"Havin My Way"	Sandimanie; Testerman; Cade Blodgett; Spurlock	Zodiac; Cade; Farsight	2:24
22.	"Allure"	Sandimanie; Kerr; Blodgett; Spurlock	Cade; Clayco; Farsight	2:52
23.	"Louvre"	Sandimanie; Kerr; Frizell; Nelson Barker	Clayco; BryceUnknwn; Y2tnb	2:13
24.	"Never Ever"	Sandimanie; Kerr; Frizell; Nelson Barker	Clayco; BryceUnknwn; Y2tnb	2:24
Total length:				63:03

=== Notes ===
- All tracks are stylized in all caps, depicted as one word and are occasionally disemvoweled. For example, "Vetements Coat" is stylized as "VTMNTSCOAT", "Fake Niggas" is stylized as "FAKENGGAS" and "Crystal Castles" is stylized as "CRYSTLCSTLES".

== Charts ==
Chart performance for No Stylist
Chart (2022)	Peak position
US Billboard 200	91
US Top R&B/Hip-Hop Albums (Billboard)	47

== Certifications ==
Region	Certification	Certified units/sales
United States (RIAA)	Gold	500,000^{‡}
^{‡} Sales+streaming figures based on certification alone.
