= Destroy Lonely =

American rapper (born 2001)

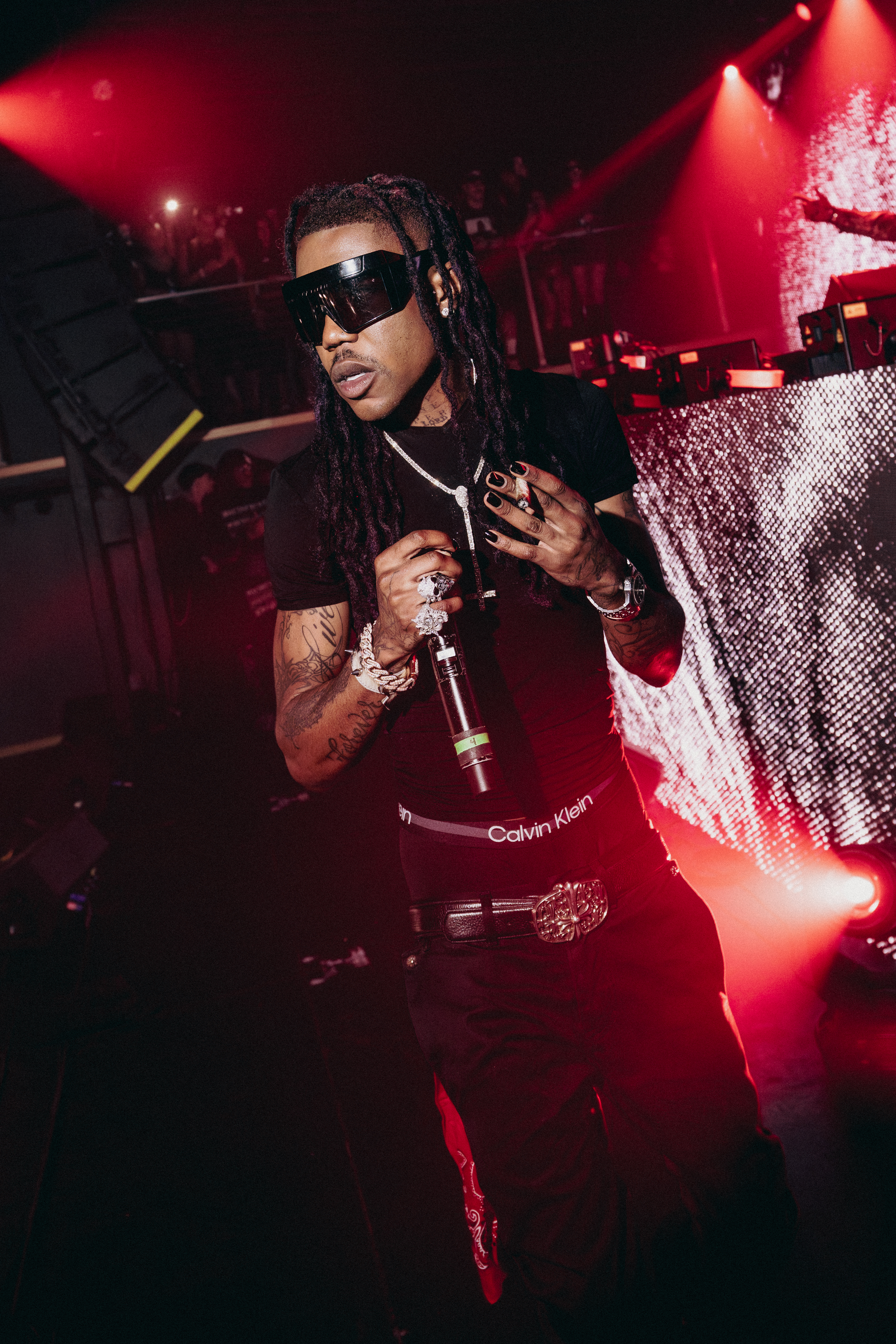
- Performing at The Vanguard in May 2026

Background information
- Also known as: Lone; Top Floor Boss; Look Killa; Fashion Demon; Babymoney; The Dark Lord
- Born: Bobby Wardell Sandimanie III; July 30, 2001 (age 25); Atlanta, Georgia, U.S.
- Genres: Southern hip-hop; trap; rage; emo rap
- Occupations: Rapper; singer; songwriter
- Works: Discography
- Years active: 2015–present
- Labels: Opium; Interscope; Ingrooves
- Partner: Shannade Clermont (2024–present)
- Father: I-20

- Website: destroylonely.com

Bobby Wardell Sandimanie III (born July 30, 2001), known professionally as Destroy Lonely, is an American rapper, singer and songwriter. His debut studio album, If Looks Could Kill (2023), peaked at number 18 on the US Billboard 200. Prior to that, his fifth mixtape, No Stylist (2022), marked his first entry on the chart at number 91.

Destroy Lonely signed with fellow Atlanta-based rapper Playboi Carti's record label Opium, an imprint of Interscope Records, in early 2021; he frequently collaborates with labelmates, rapper Ken Carson and trap duo Homixide Gang. Rolling Stone cites Destroy Lonely as being characterized by his "dynamic yet blaring" instrumentals, and his unique performing aesthetic consisting of dark-colored attire and name-brand clothing.

== Early life ==
Bobby Wardell Sandimanie III was born on July 30, 2001. He has two younger half sisters and an older half brother, and is of Liberian descent through his father and of Black American descent through his mother. He had publicly stated that he grew up primarily with his mother and grandparents. His father is the rapper I-20, who was best friends and frequent collaborator with Ludacris, and was part of his record label Disturbing tha Peace. Sandimanie began homeschooling in the sixth grade, then got enrolled back into public school in 9th and 10th grade, where he recalls abusing the drug alprazolam. He cites his feeling that his substance abuse was destroying him as the origin of the "Destroy" part of his stage name. He spent his adolescent years in solitude which he cites as the origin of the "Lonely" part of his stage name.

== Career ==
=== 2015–2019: Beginnings ===
Destroy Lonely started working on music at the age of 14, making his first songs in a recording studio at his school. He met two of his best friends, Texaco and Nezzus, who would produce many of his early works and continue to work with him on later projects at school. Immediately upon meeting Nezzus, they began recording their first project, NezzusDestroyed. Lonely would later go on to gain traction with his 2019 track "Bane".

=== 2020–2022: </3 and No Stylist ===
On September 25, 2020, Destroy Lonely released his third mixtape, titled </3 (pronounced: Broken Hearts), and a month later, on October 31, 2020, released the deluxe edition, titled </3². Following the release of </3 in 2020 and the attention from "Bane", Destroy Lonely was noticed by Playboi Carti in December 2020 after the music video for his song "Oh Yeah" was released. In early 2021, he signed to Carti's record label, Opium.

In April 2021, he appeared in Playboi Carti's music video for his song "Sky". In April 2022, he was announced as a performer at the Lyrical Lemonade Summer Smash. In July 2022, Destroy Lonely appeared on frequent collaborator Ken Carson's studio album X. Also in July 2022, he appeared on fellow Atlanta rapper Bktherula's single "Forever Pt. 2" and Rochester rapper Slump6s' album Genesis. In August 2022, Destroy Lonely released his fifth mixtape, No Stylist. The mixtape features an appearance from his labelmate Ken Carson. In September 2022, he and fellow Opium rapper Ken Carson gifted Playboi Carti a ring for his 26th birthday. In October 2022, he announced the dates for his "No Stylist" tour.

Also in October, he released a music video for his track "Vtmntscoat" which is described as containing imagery of "elaborate dinner parties and midnight car rides".

=== 2023–2024: If Looks Could Kill & Love Lasts Forever ===
On November 18, 2022, Destroy Lonely followed up his mixtape No Stylist with NS+ (Ultra), his deluxe version of the mixtape, featuring five new songs, and naming it "Ultra" after his pet bombay cat. Following this, on February 20, 2023, Destroy Lonely released a music video for the songs "Neverever" and "Fakenggas" on YouTube.

On February 21, 2023, Lonely announced on Tumblr that his next album would be released in April 2023, stating: "my album comes out in april..". On March 3, 2023, Destroy Lonely released the single "If Looks Could Kill", which was expected to be the lead single for his debut studio album. On May 5, 2023, Destroy Lonely released his debut studio album, If Looks Could Kill, consisting of 25 tracks, with a bonus track, "Money and Sex", with labelmate Ken Carson. Two additional tracks were released with the CD and vinyl editions, and also a short film, "Look Killa". On September 29, 2023, Destroy Lonely released a deluxe version of his debut studio album, titled If Looks Could Kill (Director's Cut), containing 6 new tracks from all editions.

On October 13, 2023, Destroy Lonely had three featured appearances on Ken Carson's third album, A Great Chaos, on the songs "Singapore", "Paranoid", and "Like This", which also featured Lil Uzi Vert. On August 30, 2024, Lonely released his second studio album, Love Lasts Forever, which peaked at number 10 on the Billboard 200 chart and number 1 on the Top R&B/Hip-Hop Albums chart.

=== 2025: ᐸ/3³ ===
On April 11, 2025, Lonely appeared as a feature on Ken Carson's album More Chaos, on the track "Off the Meter" alongside label founder Playboi Carti, marking Carti and Lonely's first collaboration. On June 5, 2025, Lonely surprise released his ninth EP, See U Soon </3, on SoundCloud. On September 19, 2025, Lonely released his fifth mixtape, ᐸ/3³.

== Controversies ==
In early 2024, an ex-girlfriend accused him of domestic abuse via X. Destroy Lonely denied the allegations. In November 2024, a video went viral of Destroy Lonely fighting at a gas station with his new girlfriend, Shannade Clermont, which included him screaming "I hate you!!" towards his partner and concluded with police officers instructing him to surrender. Lonely subsequently characterized the incident as a simple argument between the couple. Clermont later came to Destroy Lonely's defense by making posts over X addressing the controversy; "Stop the fucking lies. [You] never had a disagreement with your partner??? Yall a strict fucking crowd!! ✌🏾"

== Musical style ==
The Rolling Stone magazine mentions Destroy Lonely's unique way of shifting cadence and the usage of humorous lyrics in his music. He cites as influences Crystal Castles, Deftones, and The Cure, and rap predecessors such as Lil Wayne, Drake, Future, Young Thug, and Playboi Carti. His music has been described by Brandon Callender of The Fader in the following manner: "Destroy Lonely has an eclectic ear for beats that skews toward twinkly, atmospheric beats that function like canvases, his voice vivid splashes of paint." Much of Lonely's production makes use of ambient synthesizers, programmed guitar riffs and samples from orchestras as well as from video game OST's such as Genshin Impact.

Destroy Lonely's main lyrical subject matter is usually braggadocio, but his lyrics can also concern relationships, love, guns or committing financial crime, especially in his earlier material.

== Discography ==
Studio albums

- If Looks Could Kill (2023)
- Love Lasts Forever (2024)

== Tours ==
=== Headlining ===
- No Stylist Tour (2022–2023)
- Forever Tour (2024–2025)

=== Supporting ===
- Ken Carson – The X Man Tour (2022)
- Playboi Carti – Antagonist Tour (2025)
- $uicideboy$ - Grey Day Tour (2026)
