= Gunner Stahl =

American photographer

- Born: Jonathan Simmons; March 12, 1992 (age 34); Atlanta, Georgia, U.S.
- Occupations: Photographer; video director; filmographer

Jonathan Simmons (born March 12, 1992), better known as Gunner Stahl, is an American photographer from Atlanta, Georgia.

He is best known for his candid photographs of well known hip-hop musicians the Weeknd, 21 Savage, ASAP Rocky, Drake, Swae Lee, Billie Eilish, Lil Uzi Vert, Playboi Carti, Mac Miller, Nipsey Hussle, Gucci Mane and Young Thug among others.

== Career ==
"I like just being basically like a fly on the wall, just chilling and taking pictures, they just do whatever they do, and I just do whatever I do."

At 18 years old, Stahl started taking pictures. Initially, he focused on everyday life, shooting pictures of friends at school, parties, parks and concerts.

In 2014, he began shooting portraits of, then up-and-coming musicians like Swae Lee.

In 2019, Gunner Stahl published Portraits, a book that includes pictures of well known musicians like ASAP Rocky, Drake, Billie Eilish and 21 Savage. Gunner is one of the most prolific photographers in hip-hop culture. He has been praised for his vision and influence on this photography scene.

In October 18, 2024, Stahl recorded the music video for Ken Carson's single, "Overseas". Shortly after, on Halloween, Stahl also recorded the music video to Carson's single, "delusional".
