= If Looks Could Kill (Destroy Lonely album) =

- Digital version cover

Studio album by Destroy Lonely
- Released: May 5, 2023
- Recorded: October–November 2022
- Length: 78:47
- Labels: Opium; Interscope
- Producers: 2C; AM; BryceUnknwn; Cade; Carter; Clayco; Cristian Jeffries; Cxdy; DJ Moon; DxnnyFxntom; Dylxn; Esko; Farsight; Glasear; Jonah Abraham; Jwade; Kastro; Keatmn; Lil 88; Lucian; Lukrative; Macnificent; Mahxie; Nathan0nline; Okami; Ozi; ReidMD; Slo Meezy; Ssor.t; T8ko; Texaco Cam; TM88; Velveteen; Xdkole; Y2tnb; Y3rip; Yybaker; Zodiac

Destroy Lonely chronology
No Stylist (2022)	If Looks Could Kill (2023)	Love Lasts Forever (2024)

Singles from If Looks Could Kill
- 1. "If Looks Could Kill" Released: March 3, 2023

If Looks Could Kill is the debut studio album by the American rapper Destroy Lonely, released on May 5, 2023, through Opium and Interscope Records. He began recording the album in October 2022, and spent a month and a half working on it in New York with an assortment of producers, including Clayco, Cxdy, DxnnyFxntom, Lil 88 and TM88, among others. Influenced by horror films, video games and alternative rock, it is a hip-hop album featuring dark, atmospheric production that incorporates synthesizers and guitars. Its lyrics explore Lonely's lifestyle, anxiety, drugs, money, women, fashion and life choices. Lonely assumes an alter ego known as the Look Killa throughout the album's songs, artwork, music videos and in a short film released the same day as the album.

The standard version of If Looks Could Kill consists of 25 tracks, with its digital and physical releases featuring different bonus tracks. Opium labelmate Ken Carson makes the album's sole guest appearance on the digital album bonus track "Money & Sex". In March 2023, Lonely released "If Looks Could Kill" as the album's lead single. Following the album's release, he released music videos for "If Looks Could Kill" and "How U Feel?". On September 29, 2023, the Directors Cut edition of the album was released. A pop-up event celebrating its release in Los Angeles on October 1 was cut short following clashes between attendees and security.

Music critics were divided on the production and Lonely's performances on If Looks Could Kill and criticized its lyrics and length. Commercially, the album debuted at number 18 on the US Billboard 200 chart, earning 29,000 album-equivalent units in its first week. "If Looks Could Kill" charted at number 2 on Billboard's Bubbling Under Hot 100 Singles chart and was certified Gold by the Recording Industry Association of America (RIAA) in 2024.

== Background and recording ==
In the late 2010s, Destroy Lonely started releasing a series of mixtapes and extended plays (EPs). After his 2020 track "Oh Yeah" gained attention from the American rapper Playboi Carti, he signed with Carti's record label Opium under Interscope Records. In August 2022, the label released Lonely's debut commercial mixtape, No Stylist, which entered the Billboard 200. In October, Lonely recorded the title track of If Looks Could Kill in New York, where he would spend a month and a half working on the album. He credited the song, which he recorded wearing a halloween mask, with "start[ing]" the album. Lonely recorded more than 120 songs during his time in New York. He worked with an assortment of producers on the album, including longtime collaborator Clayco, who produced many of the album's tracks. In an interview with Hypebeast, he recalled its recording:

I had all my producers in the studio with me, as well as my girlfriend and best friends. It was really fun. I was watching a bunch of horror movies. I was putting my whole life on my sleeve for the moment, just making music from the heart.

== Composition and lyrics ==
If Looks Could Kill is a hip-hop album that features dark, atmospheric production that incorporates synths and guitars. Jon Powell of Revolt described the album's production as "genre-bending", whilst Jade Gomez of Paper viewed it as neither a rock or hip-hop release. According to Paul Thompson of AllMusic, the album "blends trap beats with hazy, atmospheric guitars" reminiscient of bands like Deftones and the Cure. The album overall has a "consistent" sound and average track length of three or four minutes. Its songs are largely distinguished from one another by Lonely's varying cadences and flows. Lonely utilizes Auto-Tune on his vocals, and his delivery and technique drew comparisons to Future, Lil Keed, Yeat, Young Thug, and Carti. HipHopDX's Isaac Fontes said that the album shows his preference for "hypnotic melodies and clever one-liners".

Lyrically, If Looks Could Kill explores Lonely's lifestyle, anxiety, drugs, money, women, fashion, and life choices. In an interview with Alternative Press, Lonely described the album as "nothing but sonic horror movies". He told Hypebeast that the album was meant to represent his experiences and inspirations during a "transitional period", and identified horror films, video games and alternative rock as some of the influences on its direction. He also said he was more inspired by the culture and music of Atlanta than by any particular artists.

Throughout the album's songs, as well as in its artworks and music videos, Lonely assumes the identity of an alter ego known as the Look Killa, whom he described as a care-free version of himself that "just wants to put out music". In an interview with Complex, Lonely also remarked of the alter ego: "Niggas gonna be fashion killers and fashion icons. I'm the Look Killer." He named the alter ego around the same time as his stage name. He planned to carry the Look Killa alter ego over to short and feature-length films, and to wear the mask onstage whilst touring in support of the album. Its cover artwork shows Lonely in a field of grass with his face obscured, wearing a matching black jumpsuit, gloves and hat and wielding an orange axe. Tony Centeno of Power 100.9 compared his attire to the antagonist of the 1997 slasher film I Know What You Did Last Summer.

== Songs ==
"If Looks Could Kill"
Lonely juxtaposes lyrics about fashion with violence on the title track, which revolves around a three-chord electric guitar riff.

"Safety"
On "Safety", Lonely raps about money, fashion and security over distorted acoustic guitars and drums.

If Looks Could Kill opens with "How U Feel?", which Kieran Press-Reynolds from Pitchfork described as featuring an "infernal blaze of gothic guitar". On the title track, which revolves around a three-chord electric guitar riff, Lonely proclaims himself a "fashion demon" and juxtaposes lyrics about fashion with violence, according to Jewel Wicker of Alternative Press. Lonely talks of his "rock star, drug-fueled lifestyle" atop "wailing guitar lines" on "Fly Sht" and "Raver". Press-Reynolds highlighted his unfocused, "punchy bunny-hop flow" on the former. "Came in Wit" combines "serrated" synthwork with reverb and dissonance. After shouting out the eponymous basketball player on "Chris Paul", which Fontes deemed a highlight for his "hungry, energetic performance", Lonely makes predictions about his future on "Superstar". Lonely pridefully raps about his clothes and new home on "New New". "Right Now" features gothic, GarageBand-esque guitars and ambient synths. "Which Way" sees Lonely brag about his jewelry. "Moment of Silence" features a "melancholic" guitar riff and "stuttering" hi-hats, over which Lonely juxtaposes braggadocio with "dread filled" confessions and introspection. Fontes compared the song to Travis Scott's 2018 song "Astrothunder", whose "existential confusion is felt more than expressed." "Brazy Girls" shifts from the album's other songs due to its 1980s-inspired synths. On the six-minute long "Safety", Lonely raps about money, fashion and needing to pay for security over distorted acoustic guitars and drums that lead into a "flashy volume swivel" at the end of the song.

== Release and promotion ==
In December 2022, Lonely released distorted audio snippets of new material through Tumblr. On March 3, 2023, "If Looks Could Kill" was released as the album's lead single. An early, leaked version of the song garnered over 200,000 streams and 75 million views on TikTok prior to its official release. It charted at number 2 on the Billboard Bubbling Under Hot 100 Singles chart, and number 30 on the US Hot R&B/Hip-Hop Songs chart. A music video for the song was released on May 26, 2023. On August 27, 2024, the song was certified Gold by the Recording Industry Association of America (RIAA).

On April 28, 2023, Lonely announced If Looks Could Kill and revealed its release date and track listing, detailing the bonus tracks for its physical releases. The CD version featured the bonus tracks "Too Damn Rich" and "Spillin"; the vinyl version featured both songs plus "Check the Fleet" and "Back Sippin". Opium labelmate Ken Carson makes the album's sole guest feature across all versions on the digital bonus track "Money & Sex". If Looks Could Kill was released through Opium and Interscope Records on May 5, 2023. The album earned 29,398 album-equivalent units in its first week, of which 2,495 came from pure album sales, to debut at number 18 on the US Billboard 200 chart. Lonely released an accompanying short film directed by James "JMP" Pereira, titled Look Killa, on the same day as the album's release. Assuming the role of its titular character, the film depicts Lonely using his music to kill his victims, whom are purportedly targeted for their "proximity to a potential love interest", per Powell. On August 1, 2023, Lonely released a music video for "How U Feel?", which was featured in the 2023 film Insidious: The Red Door.

On September 29, 2023, Lonely released the Directors Cut edition of If Looks Could Kill, featuring "Catch a Kill" and "That's My", alongside the five bonus tracks. To celebrate its release, a pop up event was planned to be held in Fairfax, Los Angeles in the evenings of October 1–2, 2023. The event was cancelled on the first night, following a two-hour delay and clashes between attendees and security, resulting in property damage. Lonely attempted to calm down fans who, upon seeing him, attempted to stop him from leaving the event by surrounding and entering his car.

== Critical reception ==
Professional ratings
Review scores
Source	Rating
AllMusic	2/5 stars
HipHopDX	2.4/5
HotNewHipHop	"Very Hottttt"
Pitchfork	5.7/10

Wicker of Alternative Press stated that If Looks Could Kill showed Lonely "finally hitting his stride as a rapper", establishing him as the "focal point" of his songs and allowing him to escape comparisons to Carti. Armon Sandler of Vibe likewise said that it showed Lonely's ambitions to move out of the shadow of Carti, praising his abilities and range of topics on the album. Thompson of AllMusic found some of the album's production "remarkable" but said its musical impact was nullified by Lonely's "bland" and unoriginal lyrics. He also felt that listeners whom did not identify with the album's mood would view it as an "interminable slog". Though highlighting its "wonderfully-layered" production, HipHopDX's Fontes felt that Lonely's flows and lyrics were not diverse enough for the album to warrant its length, with its "glimpses of greatness [...] get[ting] buried in languid excess". Press-Reynolds from Pitchfork felt the album was "overlong and haphazard", and that Lonely had replaced the "neon joy" of his previous output with "a vacuum of formulaic beats and flexes with the odd flicker of genuine creativity." Anthony Fantano of The Needle Drop ranked it fifth on his "Worst Albums of 2023" list.

== Track listing ==
Credits adapted from Apple Music and the liner notes of If Looks Could Kill.

If Looks Could Kill track listing
No.	Title	Writer(s)	Producer(s)	Length
1.	"How U Feel?"	Bobby Sandimanie III; Carter Bryson; Thomas Ross	Carter; Ssor.t	3:53
2.	"If Looks Could Kill"	Sandimanie; Bryson; Corey Kerr; Ross	Carter; Clayco; Ssor.t	3:14
3.	"Fly Sht"	Sandimanie; Arman Andican; Ross; Bryson; Kerr	AM; Ssor.t; Carter; Clayco	3:30
4.	"Which One"	Sandimanie; Kerr; Ross; Bryson; Cade Blodgett	Clayco; Ssor.t; Carter; Cade	3:28
5.	"Raver"	Sandimanie; Kerr; Kole Samuel; John Weir	Clayco; Xdkole; Velveteen	2:11
6.	"Came in Wit'"	Sandimanie; Kerr; Y3rip	Clayco; Y3rip	1:57
7.	"By the Pound"	Sandimanie; Bryan Simmons; Corey Moon; Slo Meezy; Macnificent; Cristian Jeffries	TM88; DJ Moon; Slo Meezy; Macnificent; Jeffries	3:18
8.	"All the Time"	Sandimanie; Blodgett; Ozi	Cade; Ozi	2:19
9.	"Biggest Problem"	Sandimanie; Cody Rounds; Jwade; Keatmn	Cxdy; Jwade; Keatmn	2:44
10.	"Chris Paul"	Sandimanie; Kerr; T8ko; Samuel	Clayco; T8ko; Xdkole	3:06
11.	"Superstar"	Sandimanie; Ross; 2C	Ssor.t; 2C	3:11
12.	"New New"	Sandimanie; Kerr; Jonah Abraham; Ross; Andican	Clayco; Abraham; Ssor.t; AM	3:23
13.	"Right Now"	Sandimanie; Kerr; T8ko; Ross; Kastro	Clayco; T8ko; Ssor.t; Kastro	2:36
14.	"Which Way"	Sandimanie; Kerr; Daniel Aranson	Clayco; DxnnyFxntom	3:10
15.	"Wagwan"	Sandimanie; Kerr; Ishmael Hurst	Clayco; Okami	2:19
16.	"Moment of Silence"	Sandimanie; Bryson; Kerr; Ross	Carter; Clayco; Ssor.t	4:28
17.	"Brazy Girls"	Sandimanie; Rounds; Yybaker; Blodgett	Cxdy; Yybaker; Cade	2:48
18.	"Goin' Up"	Sandimanie; Kerr; Samuel; Weir	Clayco; Xdkole; Velveteen	2:26
19.	"Passenger"	Sandimanie; Kerr; Weir; Y3rip	Clayco; Velveteen; Y3rip	3:13
20.	"Promo"	Sandimanie; Blodgett; Kerr; Nathan0nline; Ross	Cade; Clayco; Nathan0nline; Ssor.t	4:09
21.	"Worth It"	Sandimanie; Blodgett; Kerr; T8ko; Ross; Cyrus Spurlock	Cade; Clayco; T8ko; Ssor.t; Farsight	3:03
22.	"Redlight"	Sandimanie; Bryce Frizzell; Travis Nelson Barker; Matthew Testerman	BryceUnknwn; Y2tnb; Zodiac	2:57
23.	"Make Sum Work"	Sandimanie; Kerr; Abraham; Ross; Andican; 2C	Clayco; Abraham; Ssor.t; AM; 2C	2:44
24.	"Safety" (Interlude)	Sandimanie; Oliver Brown; Ross; Bryson; Kerr; John Ong	Esko; Ssor.t; Carter; Clayco; Glasear	5:38
25.	"Your Eyes"	Sandimanie; Rounds; Sean Reid	Cxdy; ReidMD	3:02
Total length:				78:47

Bonus track (digital album)
No.	Title	Writer(s)	Producer(s)	Length
26.	"Money & Sex" (featuring Ken Carson)	Sandimanie; Kenyatta Frazier Jr.; Ross; Ștefan Cișmigiu	Ssor.t; Lucian	4:32
Total length:				83:19

Bonus tracks (CD)
No.	Title	Writer(s)	Producer(s)	Length
26.	"Too Damn Rich"	Sandimanie; Dylxn; Jalan Rowe	Dylxn; Lil 88	3:15
27.	"Spillin'"	Sandimanie; Kerr; Weir; Texaco Cam	Clayco; Velveteen; Texaco Cam	2:21
Total length:				84:23

Bonus tracks (vinyl)
No.	Title	Writer(s)	Producer(s)	Length
26.	"Check the Fleet"	Sandimanie; Kerr; Ross; Abraham	Clayco; Ssor.t; Abraham	3:56
27.	"Back Sippin'"	Sandimanie; Kerr; Bryson; Ross	Clayco; Carter; Ssor.t	2:28
Total length:				85:11

If Looks Could Kill (Directors Cut) track listing
No.	Title	Writer(s)	Producer(s)	Length
26.	"Catch a Kill"	Sandimanie; Pierre Thevenot; Ross; Cişmigiu; Brown	Lukrative; Prodbyblezzy; Ssor.t; Lucian; Esko	3:11
27.	"That's My"	Sandimanie; Moon; Rowe	DJ Moon; Lil 88	2:31
28.	"Money & Sex" (featuring Ken Carson)	Sandimanie; Kenyatta Frazier Jr.; Ross; Ștefan Cișmigiu	Ssor.t; Lucian	4:32
29.	"Too Damn Rich"	Sandimanie; Dylxn; Jalan Rowe	Dylxn; Lil 88	3:15
30.	"Spillin'"	Sandimanie; Kerr; Weir; Texaco Cam	Clayco; Velveteen; Texaco Cam	2:21
31.	"Check the Fleet"	Sandimanie; Kerr; Ross; Abraham	Clayco; Ssor.t; Abraham	3:56
32.	"Back Sippin'"	Sandimanie; Kerr; Bryson; Ross	Clayco; Carter; Ssor.t	2:28
Total length:				101:02

Notes
- All song titles are stylized in lower case.
- "If Looks Could Kill" stylized as "if looks could kill..."
Additional credits
- Mixing by Ellantre "Tre5" Williams
- Atmos mixing by Timon "TMA" Adams
- Mastered by Travis Lewis
- Photography by James "JMP" Pereira

== Charts ==
Chart performance for If Looks Could Kill
Chart (2023)	Peak position
Belgian Albums (Ultratop Flanders)	184
Canadian Albums (Billboard)	62
Lithuanian Albums (AGATA)	51
Polish Albums (ZPAV)	97
UK R&B Albums (Official Charts)	34
US Billboard 200	18
US Top R&B/Hip-Hop Albums (Billboard)	4

== Release history ==
Region	Date	Format(s)	Label	Ref.
Various	May 5, 2023	Streaming; digital download	Opium; Interscope	
Various	May 5, 2023	CD	Opium; Interscope	
Various	August 11, 2023	Vinyl	Opium; Interscope	
