= Opium (record label) =

American hip-hop record label

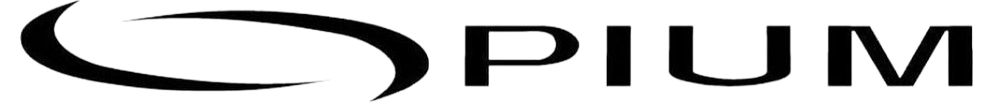
- Parent company: Universal Music Group
- Founded: 2019; 7 years ago
- Founder: Playboi Carti
- Distributors: Interscope Records; Virgin Music Group; Foundation Media
- Genre: Hip-hop; trap; rage
- Country of origin: United States
- Location: Atlanta, Georgia
- Official website: opiumopium.com

Opium (occasionally stylized as 00pium) is an American record label and rap collective founded in 2019 by American rapper Playboi Carti. The label, which is based in Atlanta, Georgia, currently holds five acts: Playboi Carti himself, rappers Ken Carson, Destroy Lonely, and ASAP Nast, and rap duo HXG, all of whom are natives to the city (besides ASAP Nast). The label is also affiliated with a variety of producers including KP Beatz, Lil 88, and F1lthy, who all worked extensively on Playboi Carti's second studio album, Whole Lotta Red.

Opium artists usually feature a dark rap sound and aesthetic that is built upon the Atlanta rage rap scene and is influenced by the 70s and 80s punk rock era. The niche style of its artists strays away from mainstream trap rappers and has garnered its own cultlike fanbase.

== History ==
On July 23, 2021, Ken Carson, who signed to Opium in 2019, released his debut studio album Project X, but did not reach the US Billboard 200 chart. On July 8, 2022, Carson released his second studio album X, which debuted at number 115 on the US Billboard 200 chart, and number 50 on the US Top R&B/Hip-Hop Albums chart. The album was supported by the release of one single: "The End", which released on July 5. On August 12, 2022, Destroy Lonely, who signed to Opium in 2021, released his fifth mixtape No Stylist, which debuted at number 91 on the US Billboard 200 and number 57 on the US Top R&B/Hip-Hop Albums chart. In October 2022, Carson released the deluxe edition of X, titled Xtended, containing 5 additional tracks. In November 2022, Destroy Lonely released the deluxe edition of No Stylist, titled NS+ (Ultra), containing several new tracks.

In May 2023, Destroy Lonely released his debut studio album If Looks Could Kill, which was supported by the lead single of the same name, released on March 3, 2023, after the unreleased snippet became viral on TikTok. The single debuted at number 30 on the US Hot R&B/Hip-Hop Songs chart. If Looks Could Kill received mostly positive reviews from music critics. The album debuted at number 18 on the US Billboard 200, earning 29,000 album-equivalent units in its first week, becoming Destroy Lonely's highest-charting album. In September 2023, Destroy Lonely released the deluxe edition of If Looks Could Kill, subtitled Director's Cut, containing all tracks from every edition (including vinyl, CD and digital versions). In October 2023, Carson released his third studio album A Great Chaos, which debuted at number 11 on the US Billboard 200, earning 49,000 album-equivalent units in its first week, and becoming his first US top 20 album. The album was supported by the release of one single: "I Need U", which released on Valentine's Day. On May 31, 2024, HXG released their third studio album I5u5we5, being the duo's first release under Interscope Records. On July 5, 2024, Carson released the deluxe version of A Great Chaos, containing 7 new additional tracks; one of them being the single, "Overseas". The single became his first entry on the US Billboard Hot 100, debuting at number 79.

Destroy Lonely released his second studio album, Love Lasts Forever, on August 30, 2024. The album debuted at number 1 on the US Top R&B/Hip-Hop Albums, marking his first number one on the chart. The album had also debuted at number 10 on the US Billboard 200, earning 37,500 album-equivalent units in its first week. The album was supported by the release of one single: "Luv 4 Ya", which released on June 14. On September 4, 2024, Destroy Lonely released the deluxe version of Love Lasts Forever, subtitled V2.5, which added 10 new tracks to the project. On November 1, 2024, Carson released the single "Delusional" in promotion for his fourth studio album, More Chaos. The single debuted at number 49 on the US Hot R&B/Hip-Hop Songs. Carson released the album on April 11, 2025, his 25th birthday, and became his first album to reach the number 1 spot and his second album to enter the top 10 on the Billboard 200 and the Top R&B/Hip-Hop Albums respectively, earning 59,500 album-equivalent units in its first week and becoming his highest-charting and fastest-selling album. In August 2025, Carti announced the Antagonist Tour, with support from Carson, Destroy Lonely, HXG, and affiliate ApolloRed1. The tour was originally planned to begin in July 2023 but was postponed and cancelled.

== Current artists ==
Artists	Year signed	Releases under the label	Notes
Playboi Carti	Founder	—N/a	Jointly with Interscope
Ken Carson	2019	5	Jointly with Interscope, formerly with Foundation
Destroy Lonely	2021	4	Jointly with Interscope, formerly with Ingrooves
HXG	2021	5	Jointly with Interscope, formerly with Foundation and Ingrooves
ASAP Nast	2025	—N/a	Jointly with AWGE

== Discography ==
Nine studio albums and three mixtapes have been released through the label.

=== Albums ===
==== Studio albums ====
Artist	Album	Details
Ken Carson	Project X (released with Foundation)	Released: July 11, 2021; Chart position: —; RIAA Certification: —
Ken Carson	X (released with Interscope)	Released: July 8, 2022; Chart position: #115 U.S.; RIAA Certification: —
HXG	Homixide Lifestyle (released with Foundation)	Released: November 22, 2022; Chart position: —; RIAA Certification: —
HXG	Snot or Not (released with Foundation)	Released: April 27, 2023; Chart position: —; RIAA Certification: —
Destroy Lonely	If Looks Could Kill (released with Interscope)	Released: May 5, 2023; Chart position: #18 U.S.; RIAA Certification: —
Ken Carson	A Great Chaos (released with Interscope)	Released: October 13, 2023; Chart position: #11 U.S.; RIAA Certification: Platinum
HXG	I5u5we5 (released with Interscope)	Released: May 31, 2024; Chart position: —; RIAA Certification: —
Destroy Lonely	Love Lasts Forever (released with Interscope)	Released: August 30, 2024; Chart position: #10 U.S.; RIAA Certification: —
Ken Carson	More Chaos (released with Interscope)	Released: April 11, 2025; Chart position: #1 U.S.; RIAA Certification: —
HXG	Homixide Lifestyle 2 (released with Interscope)	Released: August 1, 2025; Chart position: —; RIAA Certification: —
Ken Carson	Xperiment (released with Interscope)	Released: July 3, 2026; Chart position: #7 U.S.; RIAA Certification: —

==== Mixtapes ====
Artist	Album	Details
Destroy Lonely	No Stylist (released with Interscope and Ingrooves)	Released: August 12, 2022; Chart position: #91 U.S.; RIAA Certification: Gold
HXG	5th Amndmnt (released with Ingrooves)	Released: October 27, 2023; Chart position: —; RIAA Certification: —
Destroy Lonely	ᐸ/3³ (released with Interscope)	Released: September 19, 2025; Chart position: #64 U.S.; RIAA Certification: —

== See also ==
- Cactus Jack Records
