= Forest Hills Drive: Live =

Live album by J. Cole
- Released: January 28, 2016
- Recorded: August 30, 2015
- Venues: Crown Coliseum (Fayetteville, North Carolina)
- Genre: Hip hop
- Length: 1:07:12
- Labels: Dreamville; Roc Nation; Columbia
- Producers: CritaCal; Cardiak; Dré Charles; Illmind; J. Cole; Jproof; L&X Music; Nick Paradise; Phonix Beats; Pop Wansel; Ron Gilmore; Vinylz; Willie B

J. Cole chronology
2014 Forest Hills Drive (2014)	Forest Hills Drive: Live (2016)	4 Your Eyez Only (2016)

Forest Hills Drive: Live is the first live album by American hip hop recording artist J. Cole. It was released on January 28, 2016 coinciding with Cole's 31st birthday, and recorded on August 30, 2015 live in Fayetteville, North Carolina.

== Background ==
=== J. Cole: Road to Homecoming ===
On December 15, 2015, Cole announced a mini-documentary series titled, J. Cole: Road to Homecoming and released episode one the same day. Episode two was released on December 23. Episode three was released on December 30, Kendrick Lamar, Wale, ASAP Ferg and Rihanna made appearances. Episode four was released on January 6, 2016. All episodes were available for free on Vimeo until January 9.

=== Forest Hills Drive: Homecoming ===
Forest Hills Drive: Homecoming aired January 9, 2016, on HBO and HBO Now, and includes guest appearances from Jay Z, Drake, and Wale. The film took place during his Forest Hills Drive Tour at his fall 2015 show at the Crown Coliseum in Fayetteville, North Carolina. On January 28, 2016, Cole released the music video for "Love Yourz", which first premiered in the live concert film.

== Commercial performance ==
In his home country of United States, the album debuted at number 71 on the US Billboard 200 and number 11 on the Top R&B/Hip-Hop Albums. On the chart dated May 21, 2016 Forest Hills Drive: Live debuted at number 14 on the US Vinyl Albums chart.

Professional ratings
Review scores
Source	Rating
AllMusic	3/5 stars
HipHopDX	3.9/5 stars

== Track listing ==
1. "Intro (Live)" – 2:06
2. "January 28th (Live)" – 6:55
3. "Wet Dreamz (Live)" – 4:25
4. "03' Adolescence (Live)" – 4:32
5. "A Tale of 2 Citiez (Live)" – 4:44
6. "Fire Squad (Live)" – 3:39
7. "St. Tropez (Live)" – 7:47
8. "Intermission (Live)" (includes "Lights Please", "In the Morning", & "Nobody's Perfect") – 6:50
9. "G.O.M.D. (Live)" – 5:01
10. "No Role Modelz (Live)" – 5:56
11. "Hello (Live)" – 3:01
12. "Apparently (Live)" – 4:46
13. "Love Yourz (Live)" – 7:44

== Personnel ==
Credits adapted from the liner notes of Forest Hills Drive: Live

- Juro "Mez" Davis – mix engineer
- DJ Dummy – DJ, music director
- Ron Gilmore – keyboard
- Irvin Washington – keyboard
- David Linaburg – guitar
- Carlin White – drums
- T. S. Desandies – background vocals
- Brittany Carter – background vocals
- Cedric Brown – stage manager
- Lashard Davis – props manager
- Jonathan Gilmore – lighting director
- Brandon Henderson – monitor engineer
- Raymond Rodgers – production manager, front of house engineer
- Tygrr Dosremedios – assistant production manager
- Chris Athens – master engineer
- Elijah Shaw – head of security
- KC Saney – tour manager
- Adam Rodney for Dreamville – creative manager
- Vlad Sepetov – photography
- Ryan Doubiago – photography
- Ibrahim Hamad for Dreamville – management

== Charts ==
Chart (2016)	Peak position
US Billboard 200	71
US Top R&B/Hip-Hop Albums (Billboard)	11
