= Dreamville Ventures =

American multimedia company

- Company type: Private
- Founded: October 12, 2020; 5 years ago
- Founder: J. Cole; Ibrahim "Ib" Hamad
- Headquarters: United States
- Key people: Damien Scott (president); Candace Rodney (executive vice president)
- Parent: Dreamville
- Divisions: Dreamville Studios; Dreamville Films

Dreamville Ventures is an American multi-disciplinary media company co-founded by J. Cole and Ibrahim "Ib" Hamad in 2020. It is a parent company to Dreamville Studios, which was also launched in 2020.

== History ==
On October 12, 2020, Dreamville announced the formation of Dreamville Ventures with Damien Scott leading the division as president with Candace Rodney as executive vice president, overseeing daily operations including verticals across music, TV and film, publishing, apparel and live events. On April 19, 2021, Dreamville Ventures partnered with the Marcus Graham Project and their iCR8 Bootcamp, a program dedicated to media marketing. The partnership with Apple aims to increase diversity and equity in the music and entertainment industry.

== Divisions ==
=== Dreamville Studios ===
On October 12, 2020, Dreamville Studios was launched, a content studio that will produce original and co-produced content, with Candace Rodney who serves as president of Dreamville Studios. Candace Rodney previously worked as Senior Vice President of Development at Wilmore Films, as well as positions at Sony Pictures Television, Lionsgate Television and Creative Artists Agency.

=== Dreamville Films ===
Dreamville Films, Inc is an American entertainment company founded in 2015 that produces and distributes films. In 2015, they established a distribution deal HBO. They released documentaries J. Cole: Road to Homecoming, Forest Hills Drive: Homecoming, and J. Cole: 4 Your Eyez Only in partnership with HBO.

=== Dreamville Festival ===
On April 27, 2018, J. Cole announced the Dreamville Festival, the festival featuring local music, culture, food and art, and also include a mix of up-and-comers and national acts. It is expected to be an annual festival. However, in the wake of Hurricane Florence, the event was postponed from its original date. The festival was rescheduled and be held at Dorothea Dix Park in Raleigh, North Carolina on April 6, 2019. The Dreamville Festival donated proceeds to the Dorothea Dix Park Conservancy and the Dreamville Foundation.

For the 2020 season, the Dreamville Festival is front-of-jersey sponsor for USL Championship soccer team North Carolina FC. The second annual festival was initially slated for April 4, 2020 however, due to the COVID-19 pandemic it was postponed and eventually cancelled.

On September 27, 2021, Dreamville announced the second annual festival will be taking place on April 2 and April 3, 2022. Following the cancelation due to the global pandemic, Adam Roy said in a press release, "It's exciting to finally be back. Ever since we wrapped our first fest, we've been waiting to get back to the park with our Dreamville family. We had to come back bigger and better than before." The two-day festival will also be at Dorothea Dix Park in Raleigh, North Carolina.

== Filmography ==
=== Films and series ===
Year	Film	Directed by	Notes	Distributor
2015	J. Cole: Road to Homecoming	Scott Lazer	Mini-documentary series	HBO
2016	Forest Hills Drive: Homecoming	Scott Lazer	Concert film	HBO
2016	Eyez	Scott Lazer	Documentary	Tidal
2017	Too High to Riot	Scott Lazer	Documentary	Tidal
2017	FIENDS in Tokyo	Nelson Navarrete	Documentary	Tidal
2017	J.I.D: The Never Story	Scott Lazer	Mini documentary	YouTube
2017	Too High to Riot: Europe	Anthony "Supreme" Thompson	Documentary	Tidal
2017	J. Cole: 4 Your Eyez Only	Scott Lazer	Documentary	HBO
2017	Lute: Still Slummin	Tim Grant	Mini documentary	YouTube
2018	Cozz: Effected	Darius Turbak	Mini documentary	YouTube
2019	Out Of Omaha	Clay Tweel	Documentary	Imperative Entertainment, Firefly Theater & Films
2019	Dreamville Presents: REVENGE	Scott Lazer	Documentary	YouTube
2020	Lute Presents: GoldMouf Chronicles	Alexander Hall	Mini series	YouTube
2021	Applying Pressure: The Off-Season Documentary	Scott Lazer	Documentary	YouTube

=== Podcasts ===
Year	Film	Hosted by	Distributor
2021	The Messenger	Bas	Spotify
2024	Inevitable	J. Cole, Ibrahim Hamad, Scott Lazer	Self-distributed
