= Vinylz =

American music producer

- Also known as: Vinylz
- Born: Anderson Hernandez; September 2, 1989 (age 36); Manhattan, New York City, U.S.
- Genres: Hip hop; trap; R&B
- Occupations: Record producer; songwriter
- Instruments: FL Studio; keyboard; sampler
- Years active: 2007–present
- Label: Sony/ATV

Anderson Hernandez (born September 2, 1989), professionally known as Vinylz, is an American record producer from Washington Heights, New York City. He is known for his work with Jay-Z, Travis Scott, Rick Ross, Drake, J. Cole, Nicki Minaj, Jeremih and Tinashe.

Vinylz secured a publishing deal with Sony ATV through fellow record producer and mentor, Boi-1da, whom he has worked closely with.

== Early life and career ==
Anderson Hernandez was born to immigrated parents from the Dominican Republic on September 2, 1989, in Washington Heights, a neighborhood located in the New York City borough of Manhattan, living across the street from adult contemporary musician Alicia Keys. Hernandez started producing at age 14. He received his stage name, Vinylz, courtesy of a friend who noticed both of his interests for clever sampling and his father's collection of vinyl records. Vinylz began taking music production seriously and it remained his favorite hobby ever since, but he went against his parents' wishes. He got an early professional start working with Swizz Beatz and decided to drop out of college after the first semester of his first year.

Setting up shop in Quad Studios, the well-known recording studio located in New York City's Time Square, Vinylz flourished through his work with up-and-coming or breakout artists like Drag-On and Cassidy. After reaching out to Canadian rapper Drake's in-house producer, Boi-1da, via Myspace to retrieve the instrumental for "Best I Ever Had", Vinylz ended up forming a relationship which would remain long after the request. Impressed by his work, Boi-1da became a mentor to the up-and-comer; the two continued on to collaborate from that point on.

In 2013, Jay Z's "F***WithMeYouKnowIGotIt" featuring Rick Ross and DJ Khaled's "No New Friends" featuring Drake, Rick Ross and Lil Wayne, both of which produced by Vinylz and Boi-1da, were respectively placed on the Top 40 of the Billboard Hot 100 chart; the latter was certified gold by the Recording Industry Association of America (RIAA). A variety of hits, alongside Boi-1da, helped Vinylz reach a publishing deal with Sony ATV.

Throughout 2015, he produced a high number of tracks for such artists, including Jeremih's "Planez", Big Sean's "Blessings", Meek Mill's "RICO", Lil Durk's "Like Me" and Chris Brown's "Back to Sleep".

== Production discography ==
List of songs as producer or co-producer, with performing artists and other credited producers, showing year released and album name.

Title	Year	Performing artist(s)	Other producer(s)	Album
Amnesia	2008	Cassidy		Back to the Problem
Henny, Bacardi and Swag like Rick James	2010	Cassidy		Face 2 Face EP
Gucci Time	2010	Gucci Mane, Swizz Beatz	Swizz Beatz, The Individuals	The Appeal: Georgia's Most Wanted
One Shot	2010	Cassidy, Junior Reid, Notch		C.A.S.H.
Girl Like Her	2010	Cassidy, Mya	Top Notch	C.A.S.H.
She Addicted	2010	Cassidy, Nalia Boss	Cassidy	C.A.S.H.
MMG The World is Ours	2012	Rick Ross, Pharrell, Meek Mill, Stalley	Boi-1da	Rich Forever
Like Diz	2012	Roscoe Dash, 2 Chainz	Boi-1da	2.0
We Can Have a Ball	2012	Sammy Adams		OK Cool
Intro	2012	Alley Boy		The Gift of Discernment
Ice Cream 2K12	2012	Emilio Rojas		No Shame, No Regrets
Dollar and a Dream	2012	Siya		D.Y.K.E. (Damn You Killin Em)
NBA	2013	Joe Budden, Wiz Khalifa, French Montana	Boi-1da	No Love Lost
Castles	2013	Joe Budden	Allen Ritter	No Love Lost
Better Way Pt. 2 (Tribute to Sandy Hook)	2013	Bizzle	Boi-1da	The Good Fight
Brink of Amazing	2013	Daniel de Bourg	Boi-1da	London Bread
Bump That Bass	2013	Jeremih, Twista		—N/a
Nasty Girl	2013	Jim Jones, Jeremih, DJ Spinking		Vampire Life 3
5am in Toronto	2013	Drake	Boi-1da	Care Package
No New Friends	2013	DJ Khaled, Drake, Lil Wayne, Rick Ross	Robert Bullock, Boi-1da, Noah "40" Shebib	Suffering from Success
Wherever We Go We Want	2013	French Montana, Ne-Yo, Raekwon	Allen Ritter, Reefa	Excuse My French
Was it Worth it	2013	Kid Ink, Sterling Simms		Almost Home
You Know	2013	Fabolous, Young Jeezy	Boi-1da	The Soul Tape 3
FuckWithMeYouKnowIGotIt	2013	Jay-Z, Rick Ross	Boi-1da, Timbaland, Jerome "J-Roc" Harmon	Magna Carta Holy Grail
The Language	2013	Drake	Boi-1da	Nothing Was the Same
Body Operator	2013	DJ Spinking, French Montana, Jeremih		data-sort-value="" style="background: var(--background-color-interactive, #ececec); color: var(--color-base, inherit); vertical-align: middle; text-align: center; " class="table-na" | —N/a
Shinin' Like I'm Las Vegas	2013	DJ Whoo Kid, Nipsey Hussle		data-sort-value="" style="background: var(--background-color-interactive, #ececec); color: var(--color-base, inherit); vertical-align: middle; text-align: center; " class="table-na" | —N/a
Vulnerable	2014	Tinashe, Travis Scott	Boi-1da	Black Water
Believe Me	2014	Lil Wayne, Drake	Boi-1da	Back on My Shit
Grindin	2014	Lil Wayne, Drake	Boi-1da	Back on My Shit
Chiraq	2014	Nicki Minaj, Lil Herb	Boi-1da	—N/a
FuckWithMeYouKnowIGotIt (Reprise)	2014	Rick Ross	Boi-1da, Timbaland, Jerome "J-Roc" Harmon	Mastermind
Adult Swim	2014	DJ Spinking, Tyga, A$AP Ferg, Jeremih, Velous		—N/a
Best Kept Secret	2014	Sammy Adams		Wizzy
Don't Play	2014	Travis Scott, Big Sean, The 1975	Allen Ritter, Travis Scott	Days Before Rodeo
0 to 100 / The Catch Up	2014	Drake	Boi-1da, 40, Nineteen85	Non-album single
4 the Freaks	2014	Jeremih		N.O.M.A.
A Tale of 2 Citiez	2014	J. Cole		2014 Forest Hills Drive
Fire Squad	2014	J. Cole	J. Cole	2014 Forest Hills Drive
All Things Go	2014	Nicki Minaj	Boi-1da, Allen Ritter	The Pinkprint
Bish Bounce	2014	Fabolous	Boi-1da	The Young OG Project
Gone for the Winter	2014	Fabolous, Velous	DJ RellyRell	The Young OG Project
Planez	2015	Jeremih, J. Cole		Late Nights
Paradise	2015	Jeremih	Soundz, Mick Schultz	Late Nights
Blessings	2015	Big Sean, Drake, Kanye West	Allen Ritter	Dark Sky Paradise
Star67	2015	Drake		If You're Reading This It's Too Late
Know Yourself	2015	Drake	Boi-1da, Syksense	If You're Reading This It's Too Late
You and the 6	2015	Drake	Boi-1da, Illmind	If You're Reading This It's Too Late
You Changed Me	2015	Jamie Foxx, Chris Brown	Boi-1da, Allen Ritter, Jordan Evans	Hollywood: A Story of a Dozen Roses
On the Dot	2015	Jamie Foxx, Fabolous	Allen Ritter	Hollywood: A Story of a Dozen Roses
Another Dose	2015	Jamie Foxx	Boi-1da, Frank Dukes	Hollywood: A Story of a Dozen Roses
Like Me	2015	Lil Durk, Jeremih	Boi-1da, Allen Ritter	Remember My Name
RICO	2015	Meek Mill, Drake	Allen Ritter, Cubeatz	Dreams Worth More Than Money
Right Hand	2015	Drake		Non-album single
Like Me (Remix)	2015	Lil Durk, Jeremih, Lil Wayne, Fetty Wap	Boi-1da, Allen Ritter	Remember My Name
Cut the Check	2015	Mac Miller, Chief Keef		GO:OD AM
Say So	2015	G-Eazy		—N/a
Immortal	2015	Joe Budden	Boi-1da	All Love Lost
Back to Sleep	2015	Chris Brown		Royalty
Black Friday	2015	Kendrick Lamar		—N/a
Sex With Me	2016	Rihanna	Boi-1da, Frank Dukes	ANTI
U with Me?	2016	Drake	40, Kanye West, OZ, Ricci Riera, Axlfoile, DJ Dahi	Views
4PM In Calabasas	2016	Drake	Frank Dukes, Allen Ritter	Care Package
Party Favors	2016	Tinashe, Young Thug	Boi-1da, Allen Ritter, Illangelo	Nightride
Pick up the Phone	2016	Travis Scott, Young Thug, Quavo	Frank Dukes	Birds in the Trap Sing McKnight
The Hooch	2016	Travis Scott	Allen Ritter, Boi-1da	Birds in the Trap Sing McKnight
The Ends	2016	Travis Scott, André 3000	WondaGurl, Daxz, OZ	Birds in the Trap Sing McKnight
Lose	2016	Travis Scott, Cassie	Frank Dukes, Allen Ritter, Mike Dean	Birds in the Trap Sing McKnight
Planet God Damn	2016	Mac Miller Njomza	Frank Dukes	The Devine Feminine
Different Now	2016	Fetty Wap	Frank Dukes	—N/a
Circles	2016	Pusha T Ty Dolla $ign Desiigner	Boi-1da, Allen Ritter	Def Jam Presents
Deja Vu	2016	Post Malone	Frank Dukes	Stoney
Deja Vu	2016	J. Cole	Boi-1da, Velous, J. Cole, Ron Gilmore	4 Your Eyez Only
Outlet	2017	Desiigner	SoundsByCT, Mike Dean	
Make a Toast	2017	Belly	Boi-1da, Allen Ritter	Mumble Rap
Fake Love	2017	Drake	Frank Dukes	More Life
GO	2017	Travis Scott & Quavo	Cubeatz and Allen Ritter	Huncho Jack, Jack Huncho
Dubai Shit	2017	Travis Scott & Quavo	OZ	Huncho Jack, Jack Huncho
Moon Rock	2017	Travis Scott & Quavo	Cubeatz	Huncho Jack, Jack Huncho
Headlock	2017	Cousin Stizz Offset	Cubeatz	One Night Only
Imitadora	2017	Romeo Santos	Allen Ritter and Frank Dukes	Golden
Sin Filtro	2017	Romeo Santos	Boi-1da, Illangelo and Illmind	Golden
This Is It	2017	Jeezy		Pressure
Ain't Ready	2017	Rich the Kid Jay Critch Famous Dex	Boi-1da and Cubeatz	—N/a
Be Careful	2018	Cardi B	Boi-1da and Frank Dukes	Invasion of Privacy
Win	2018	Jay Rock	Boi-1da and CT	Redemption
Over Me	2018	G-Eazy	Allen Ritter	The Vault
Heard About Us	2018	The Carters	Boi-1da, Jahaan Sweet and Illmind	Everything Is Love
Out for the Night Pt. 2	2018	21 Savage Travis Scott	Boi-1da	I Am I Was
Rodman	2019	Pardison Fontaine		Not There Yet
Nowhere to Run	2019	Ryan Trey, Bryson Tiller	Boi-1da, Jahaan Sweet and Lee Major	TBA
No Guidance	2019	Chris Brown, Drake	J Louis, Noah "40" Shebib and Teddy Walton	Indigo
Gold Roses	2019	Rick Ross Drake	OZ, Syk Sense, The Rascals	Port of Miami 2
Get Me	2020	Justin Bieber Kehlani	Boi-1da Jahaan Sweet	Changes
Outta Time	2020	Bryson Tiller, Drake	Nineteen85	Anniversary
Shimmy	2020	Amine		Limbo
My Reality	2020	Amine		Limbo
Access Denied	2021	Lucky Daye Ari Lennox	Allen Ritter	Table for Two
No Friends in the Industry	2021	Drake	OZ	Certified Loverboy
Tweaking	2021	Meek Mill, Vory	Maneesh	Expensive Pain
Jimmy Cooks	2022	Drake, 21 Savage	Tay Keith, Cubeatz and Tizzle	Honestly, Nevermind
El Sol Va Salir	2022	Eladio Carrion	Velous	—N/a
Boomerang	2022	Romeo Santos,	Allen Ritter	Formula Vol.3
Culpable	2022	Romeo Santos, Lapiz Conciente	Allen Ritter	Formula Vol.3
Rich Flex	2022	Drake, 21 Savage	Tay Keith	Her Loss
Meltdown	2023	Travis Scott, Drake	BYNX, Boi-1da, Tay Keith, Coleman	Utopia
Say My Grace	2023	Offset, Travis Scott,	FNZ	Set It Off
First Person Shooter	2023	Drake, J Cole	Boi-1da, Tay Keith, Oz, Coleman	For All the Dogs
Evil Ways	2023	Drake, J Cole	Boi-1da, FNZ, Fierce	For All the Dogs: Scary Hours
You Broke My Heart	2023	Drake	FNZ	For All the Dogs: Scary Hours
Outside	2024	Bryson Tiller,	Jack Uriah	Bryson Tiller
Peace Interlude	2024	Bryson Tiller,		Bryson Tiller
Rich Boy	2024	Bryson Tiller,	Boi-1da, Frank Dukes, Allen Ritter	Bryson Tiller
Ron en El Piso	2024	Residente		Las Letras Ya No Importan
Bodies	2025	Offset, JID	FNZ, Cashmere Brown & BoogzDaBeast	Non-album single
