= Eyez =

2016 film directed by Scott Lazer

- Directed by: Scott Lazer
- Produced by: Jermaine Cole (exec.); Ibrahim Hamad (exec.); Adam Roy Rodney (exec.)
- Starring: J. Cole; Ibrahim Hamad
- Distributed by: Dreamville Films
- Release date: December 2, 2016
- Running time: 40 minutes
- Language: English

Eyez is a documentary based on the creation and recording of J. Cole's fourth studio album, 4 Your Eyez Only. The film was directed by Scott Lazer, and produced by J. Cole, Ibrahim Hamad and Adam Roy Rodney. It premiered on December 2, 2016 on Tidal.

== Premise ==
The documentary was filmed at Electric Lady Studios in New York City over the summer of 2016, where sessions of the album were recorded. The studio was built by Jimi Hendrix before his death in 1970. Throughout the documentary, J. Cole and his team are captured engaging, brainstorming and recording. Sessions in the studio included musicians playing and recording the Hammond organ, trumpet, bass, and background vocals, while Cole lays down main vocal tracks. Cole explained his goals for the album in a scene saying "You get to this level of platform; the next one might go down. You're never guaranteed to be this high again. So while I'm here, let me use this opportunity to say the realest shit I've ever said." Director Scott Lazer spoke in an interview saying the documentary provides a "fly on the wall" experience saying:

I just pitched to Cole and his manager Ibraham. I said, I’ve been kind of shooting these long shots. Some of the shots I would hold the camera as long as two or three hours you know. [...] The idea was to provide the idea behind the idea. It was coming from me feeling like I was in a very privileged position of getting to watch Cole and these other amazing musicians work, and discuss what they were doing in great detail with a lot of thoughtfulness. It seemed like people would like to have this perspective. And by having those long uninterrupted shots, it created a sort of immersive experience for the viewer.

== Release ==
On December 2, 2016, Cole released the 40-minute documentary, titled Eyez. It was released exclusively on Tidal for three days until December 5, when it was made available on Dreamville's YouTube channel. The documentary also features two music videos for the tracks "False Prophets" and "Everybody Dies". Both videos were directed by Lazer who said, "I remember thinking when I was putting this together and I don't know if people beyond Cole's core fan base are really going to enjoy this. I think what the music videos did was give something for people who may not be really into it."

== Personnel ==
Credits adapted from the documentary film.

- Roperta Spitz — Editor
- David Torcivia — Colorist
- Elad Marish — Audio mix
- Isaiah Donté Lee — Additional photography

== See also ==
- J. Cole: 4 Your Eyez Only
