= Fire Squad =

Song by J. Cole

from the album 2014 Forest Hills Drive
- Released: December 9, 2014
- Recorded: 2014
- Genre: Hardcore hip hop
- Length: 4:48
- Label: Dreamville; Roc Nation; Columbia
- Songwriters: J. Cole; M. Farner
- Producer: J. Cole

"Fire Squad" is a song by American rapper J. Cole, taken from his third album, 2014 Forest Hills Drive. The song samples "Midnight Theme" performed by Manzel and "Long Red" by Mountain and "Heart Breaker" by Aguaturbia, and was produced by J. Cole and Vinylz.

== Controversy ==
Following the release of the album, the song stirred up controversy as it calls out Iggy Azalea, Eminem, Justin Timberlake and Macklemore's names. J. Cole explained what inspired the verse in an interview saying it's rooted in capitalism and clarified that it wasn't a diss, but an observation.

== Critical reception ==
"Fire Squad" received positive reviews from music critics. Justin Charity of Complex said ""Fire Squad" offers timely premonition: "This year I’ll probably go to the awards [show] dappered down/Watch Iggy win a Grammy as I try to crack a smile." Such rebellious tidbits are sprinkled throughout Forest Hills, mostly in the spirit of black pride and unprecedented manhood, such as in the song G.O.M.D: "'Why every rich black nigga gotta be famous?' 'Why every broke black nigga gotta be brainless?'/ . . . That's a stereotype, driven by some people up in Ariel Heights." These are lyrical preoccupations that rap critics disregard as earnest, unfortunately; Cole's black power theses aren't backed by threats of absurd violence, so Cole's music is allegedly boring."

== Certifications ==
Region	Certification	Certified units/sales
United Kingdom (BPI)	Silver	200,000^{‡}
United States (RIAA)	Platinum	1,000,000^{‡}
^{‡} Sales+streaming figures based on certification alone.
