= A Tale of 2 Citiez =

2014 song by J. Cole

Song by J. Cole

from the album 2014 Forest Hills Drive
- Released: December 9, 2014
- Recorded: 2014
- Genre: Hip hop, hardcore hip hop
- Length: 4:29
- Label: Dreamville Records; Roc Nation; Columbia
- Songwriters: J. Cole; Anderson Hernandez
- Producer: Vinylz

"A Tale of 2 Citiez" is a song by American rapper J. Cole from his third studio album, 2014 Forest Hills Drive. The song samples "Blocka" by Pusha T and "Bring Em Out" by T.I. It was produced by Vinylz. The song was certified 2× Platinum by the Recording Industry Association of America (RIAA), selling over 2,000,000 copies in the United States. The title references the novel A Tale of Two Cities by Charles Dickens.

== Remixes ==
On January 28, 2015, Juicy J released a remix to the song in honor of J. Cole's birthday. On November 27, Kendrick Lamar released a remix for Black Friday, as Cole put out a remix to "Alright" the same day.

== Critical reception ==
"A Tale of 2 Citiez" has received mixed reviews from music critics. Marshall Gu of PopMatters was quoted as saying, "Thankfully, the album manage to gain a steady footing after its shaky start". "A Tale of 2 Citiez" could gain from just being a tad faster to match the menace, but the menace is there—both in the twisted soul sample punctuating each line and with J. Cole's own rapping (rhyming "tints" with "rinsed" with "since" with "limits" with "pimps" and finally "glimpse" in the first verse)".

== Certifications ==
Region	Certification	Certified units/sales
United Kingdom (BPI)	Silver	200,000^{‡}
United States (RIAA)	2× Platinum	2,000,000^{‡}
^{‡} Sales+streaming figures based on certification alone.
