= 2014 Forest Hills Drive =

Studio album by J. Cole
- Released: December 9, 2014
- Recorded: 2014
- Studios: Jungle City (New York City); MSR (New York City); Perfect Sound (Hollywood); Windmark (Santa Monica)
- Genres: Hip-hop; conscious rap
- Length: 64:40
- Labels: ByStorm; Columbia; Dreamville; Roc Nation
- Producers: Illmind; J. Cole; Phonix Beats; Vinylz; Willie B

J. Cole chronology
Born Sinner (2013)	2014 Forest Hills Drive (2014)	Forest Hills Drive: Live (2016)

Singles from 2014 Forest Hills Drive
- 1. "Apparently" Released: December 9, 2014; 2. "Wet Dreamz" Released: April 14, 2015; 3. "No Role Modelz" Released: August 4, 2015; 4. "Love Yourz" Released: February 27, 2016

2014 Forest Hills Drive is the third studio album by American rapper J. Cole, released on December 9, 2014, by ByStorm Entertainment, Columbia Records, Dreamville Records and Roc Nation.

Recording sessions took place over the whole year, while the production on the album was primarily handled by Cole himself, along with several others such as Illmind, Vinylz, Phonix Beats and Willie B. It was announced three weeks before its release and had very little marketing, with no singles or promotion taking place prior to its release. The album was supported by four singles: "Apparently", "Wet Dreamz", "No Role Modelz", and "Love Yourz".

2014 Forest Hills Drive received generally positive reviews from critics who admired its ambitious concept, production and lyrics. The album debuted at number one on the US Billboard 200, selling 353,000 copies in its first week. As of September 2015, the album has sold one million copies in the United States. The album was certified six-times platinum by the Recording Industry Association of America (RIAA) in December 2024.

The album won Album of the Year at the 2015 BET Hip Hop Awards, and Top Rap Album at the 2015 Billboard Music Awards. It was nominated for Best Rap Album at the 2016 Grammy Awards. The single "Apparently" was nominated for Best Rap Performance at the 2016 Grammy Awards. The 10-year anniversary edition of the album was released in December 2024.

== Background ==
The album's title is the address of a home in Fayetteville, North Carolina, where Cole lived from his early youth, until 2003. Cole lived at the property with his mother, his brother and his stepfather, and was the location where Cole wrote some of his earliest songs, and decided to pursue a career as a musician.

In 2014, Cole bought the house, and it was the first home he had purchased. The album's title is used to recount Cole's upbringing, and the transition from leaving North Carolina to New York; it battles with the transitions that were taken in order to find his success and fame within the music industry. Cole soon put the home up for an "extremely cheap" renting price, in the hope that any struggling residents could use it to progress their lives, without having to worry about frequent moving, an experience Cole underwent due to frequent financial struggles.

== Recording and production ==
On August 15, 2014, Cole released the song "Be Free", as a response to the shooting of Michael Brown in Ferguson, Missouri. In an interview with NPR's Microphone Check radio show, Cole revealed that the song was recorded the same week he recorded the song "Intro" from 2014 Forest Hills Drive, but was never intended for the album. In September 2014, during an interview with HipHopDX, Bone Thugs-n-Harmony's manager Steve Lobel revealed Krayzie Bone and Bizzy Bone recorded a track with Cole for the album, though the song never made the album's final cut. The production on the album was primarily handled by J. Cole, along with its guest productions, including Dreamville's in-house producer Ron Gilmore, DJ Dahi, Illmind, Willie B, Phonix Beats, Vinylz and Pop Wansel, with additional production provided by Cardiak and CritaCal, among others. During production, Cole had envisioned 2014 Forest Hills Drive to be released as a double album.

== Release and promotion ==
On November 16, 2014, Cole released a video trailer, where he announced he will be releasing his third album, titled 2014 Forest Hills Drive on December 9. The video also featured footage regarding the making-of the album. Additionally, the album's name sake was revealed to be the address of Cole's childhood home in Fayetteville, North Carolina. Cole held a listening session at the home on 2014 Forest Hills Drive where he invited a select group of fans to hear the album. On February 13, 2015, Cole announced he would further promote the album with a tour called Forest Hills Drive. The tour was divided into three different acts. "Act 1: Hometown", "Act 2: The Journey" and "Act 3: Hollywood". Act 1 started on March 2, 2015, in Eugene, Oregon and ended on April 7, 2015, in Providence, Rhode Island, it featured Dreamville artists such as Bas, Cozz and Omen, who were also served as supporting acts on Act 2 and 3. Act 2 started on April 30, 2015, in Zürich, Switzerland and ended on May 18, 2015, in London, England, it featured Jhené Aiko and Pusha T. Act 3 was the longest leg of the tour, it started on July 12, 2015, in Seattle, Washington and ended on August 29, 2015, in Cole's hometown Fayetteville, North Carolina, and featured Big Sean, YG and Jeremih. Cole brought out Drake and Jay-Z to perform at the last show in Fayetteville, North Carolina. The tour sold over 570,000 tickets worldwide and grossed $20.4 million.

On December 15, 2015, Cole announced a mini-documentary series titled, J. Cole: Road to Homecoming ahead of his special Forest Hills Drive: Homecoming, and released episode one the same day. Episode two was released on December 23. Episode three was released on December 30, Kendrick Lamar, Wale, ASAP Ferg and Rihanna made appearances. Episode four was released on January 6, 2016. All episodes were available for free on Vimeo until January 9. Forest Hills Drive: Homecoming aired January 9, 2016, on HBO and HBO Now. On January 28, 2016, in celebration of his 31st birthday, Cole released his first live album titled, Forest Hills Drive: Live and also released the music video for the album's final single "Love Yourz". Both Forest Hills Drive: Homecoming and Forest Hills Drive: Live covered his fall 2015 show at the Crown Coliseum in Fayetteville, North Carolina. On December 20, 2024, the tenth-year anniversary edition of 2014 Forest Hills Drive was released with eight additional then-unreleased songs.

=== Singles ===
"Apparently" was serviced to American mainstream urban radio, as the album's first single on December 9, 2014. Cole would also go on to release the music video for "Apparently" on the same day. The song has since peaked at number 58 on the US Billboard Hot 100. The song was nominated for Best Rap Performance at the 2016 Grammy Awards. The song was also nominated for The Ashford & Simpson Songwriter's Award at the 2015 Soul Train Music Awards and Impact Track at the 2015 BET Hip Hop Awards.

The album's second single, "Wet Dreamz", was released to rhythmic contemporary radio on April 14, 2015. On April 21, the music video was released for "Wet Dreamz". The song has since peaked at number 61 on the US Billboard Hot 100. On June 16, 2016, "Wet Dreamz" was certified platinum by the Recording Industry Association of America (RIAA).

The album's third single, "No Role Modelz", was sent to urban and rhythmic radio stations on August 4, 2015. The song has since peaked at number 36 on the US Billboard Hot 100. On May 2, 2016, in an interview with Larry King Now, actress Nia Long was asked about a line from the song where Cole raps, "My only regret was too young for Lisa Bonet, my only regret was too young for Nia Long, now all I'm left with is hoes from reality shows, hand her a script the bitch probably couldn't read along." She responded by saying, "He's really not too young, he just doesn't know it." The song was certified platinum by the Recording Industry Association of America (RIAA) on May 18, 2016.

Cole released the live music video for "Love Yourz" on January 28, 2016, the music video was filmed during his Forest Hills Drive Tour, and on February 27, 2016, "Love Yourz" was released as the album's fourth and final single. The song was included in Sprite's "Obey Your Verse" campaign in 2016 where 16 lyrics from 2Pac, Missy Eliiot and Cole were emblazoned on Sprite soda cans and bottles. The song won Impact Track at the 2016 BET Hip Hop Awards. "Love Yourz" charted at number 34 on the US Twitter Top Tracks on February 13, 2016. The song has since peaked at number 25 on the US R&B/Hip-Hop Airplay.

=== Other songs ===
On December 5, 2014, Cole released a music video for the song "Intro". On December 13, 2014, rapper Waka Flocka Flame released a freestyle over the song "Fire Squad". On March 23, 2015, a music video was released for "G.O.M.D.". On November 27, 2015, in celebration of Black Friday, Cole and rapper Kendrick Lamar released two separate tracks, both titled "Black Friday". Lamar remixed Cole's "A Tale of 2 Citiez", while Cole remixed Lamar's single "Alright" from his studio album To Pimp a Butterfly. Rappers Styles P and Juicy J also released freestyles over "A Tale of 2 Citiez".

== Critical reception ==
Professional ratings
Aggregate scores
Source	Rating
AnyDecentMusic?	6.5/10
Metacritic	67/100
Review scores
Source	Rating
AllMusic	3.5/5 stars
Complex	4/5 stars
Exclaim!	8/10
Los Angeles Times	3/4 stars
The Observer	3/5 stars
Pitchfork	6.9/10
Rolling Stone	3/5 stars
Spin	6/10
USA Today	2.5/4 stars
XXL	4/5

2014 Forest Hills Drive was met with generally positive reviews. At Metacritic, which assigns a normalized rating out of 100 to reviews from mainstream publications, the album received an average score of 67, based on 17 reviews. Aggregator AnyDecentMusic? gave it 6.5 out of 10, based on their assessment of the critical consensus.

Complex critic Justin Charity praised it as Cole's most mature and well-edited album to date, crediting him for eschewing "much of the whiplash and false bravado" of his previous work. Erin Lowers of Exclaim! said, "He shines without any features, standing strong in his delivery and carrying his story to the forefront of the 13-track project. While it may not be his Late Registration, he has definitely graduated into a class of his own." Andre Grant of HipHopDX stated, "It is less artistic than it means to be, but it is truer than anything he's ever made. Its narrative, the tropes, and the strategies are completely overcome by the album's terrifying integrity." Craig Jenkins of Pitchfork said, "2014 Forest Hills Drive is a decent album selling itself as great. It wraps itself in the garments of a classic, but you can see that the tailoring is off." Kellan Miller of XXL stated, "With every quality drop from the self-proclaimed 'God', his ceiling will continue to grow and so will fan expectations." David Jeffries of AllMusic said, "2014 Forest Hills Drive comes off as a great, experimental, and advancing mixtape, but it's insider to a fault, as slight as that fault might be." Jesal "Jay Soul" Padania of RapReviews said, "He been afforded a rare amount of artistic freedom on 2014 Forest Hills Drive and there aren't even any singles, so it's great that he's more or less delivered. But whilst this definitely misses out on classic territory, that doesn't mean it isn't a bloody good album for the most part."

Marshall Gu of PopMatters said, "On 2014 Forest Hills Drive, we've still got the same ol' Cole, but with diminishing returns and without any friends to help him." David Turner of Rolling Stone said, "He speaks some incisive truths about class, race ('Fire Squad') and relationships ('Wet Dreamz'), but those insights are too often undercut by crass humor. The production falls short, too, with dull beats to match his languid flow." Jason Gubbels of Spin said, "Cole's keen sense of injustice registers throughout 2014 Forest Hills Drive, whether slagging white artists for artistic thievery or seething over national media outlets pigeonholing black genius into sports/pop either / ors.... But the absence of 'Be Free' still detracts. Unless you're the type of moviegoer who sits patiently through the end titles, feel free to duck out of 'Note to Self' a bit early and head over to SoundCloud." Robert Christgau gave the album a one-star honorable mention rating in his review for Cuepoint, naming "Wet Dreamz" and "Love Yourz" as highlights while summing the album up as being "full of the kind of good intentions the road to irrelevance is paved with".

=== Rankings ===
Select rankings of 2014 Forest Hills Drive
Publication	List	Rank	Ref.
Associated Press	Associated Press' top albums of 2014	2	
Billboard	The 10 Best Rap Albums of 2014	3	
The Boombox	10 Best Hip-Hop Albums of 2014	4	
Complex	The 50 Best Albums of 2014	4	
Cuepoint	My Favorite Hip-Hop Albums of 2014	9	
HotNewHipHop	Hottest Albums of 2014	2	
Rolling Stone	The 200 Greatest Hip-Hop Albums of All Time	132	

=== Industry awards ===
Awards and nominations for 2014 Forest Hills Drive
Year	Ceremony	Category	Result	Ref.
2015	American Music Awards	Best Rap/Hip Hop Album	Nominated	
2015	BET Hip Hop Awards	Album of the Year	Won	
2015	Billboard Music Awards	Top Rap Album	Won	
2016	Grammy Awards	Best Rap Album	Nominated	

== Commercial performance ==
2014 Forest Hills Drive debuted at number one on the US Billboard 200, selling a total of 371,000 copies, with 353,000 copies consisting of whole album sales and the remaining 17,000 copies determined based on individual song sales and streaming data. This is a tracking change that was implemented by Nielsen SoundScan and Billboard in December 2014. 2014 Forest Hills Drive became the best first week sales of J. Cole's career at the time, outpacing the first week sales of his second album Born Sinner (2013), by 74,000 copies (297,000 copies). In addition to the album's sales toppling early projections by over 100,000 copies, 2014 Forest Hills Drive also broke One Direction's record for most album streams on Spotify, being streamed over 15.7 million times in its first week, compared to One Direction's 11.5 million streams. Drake later broke this record with 17.3 million streams for his mixtape If You're Reading This It's Too Late. In its second week, the album sold 135,000 more copies. Cole became one of only six rappers to reach number one with their first three full-length studio albums, others being Drake, Rick Ross, Nelly, DMX and Snoop Dogg. As of December 2016, the album has sold 1,240,000 copies in the United States. On December 10, 2024, 2014 Forest Hills Drive was certified six-times platinum by the Recording Industry Association of America (RIAA) for combined sales, streaming and track-sale equivalents of six million units in the United States.

In 2015, 2014 Forest Hills Drive was ranked as the eighth most popular album of the year on the Billboard 200.

== Track listing ==
Credits adapted from Tidal.

2014 Forest Hills Drive track listing
No.	Title	Writer(s)	Producer(s)	Length
1.	"Intro"	Jermaine Cole	J. Cole; Ron Gilmore^{[b]}	2:09
2.	"January 28th"	Cole; Timothy Thomas; Andre Thomas; Yumi Arai; Kunihiko Murai	Cole; Nick Paradise^{[b]}; Dré Charles^{[b]}	4:02
3.	"Wet Dreamz"	Cole; Charles Simmons; Roy Hammond	Cole	3:59
4.	"03' Adolescence"	Cole; William Brown; Johnny Burke; Jimmy Van Heusen	Willie B	4:24
5.	"A Tale of 2 Citiez"	Cole; Anderson Hernandez	Vinylz	4:29
6.	"Fire Squad"	Cole; Mark Farner; Manzel Bush; Brion Unger	Cole; Vinylz^{[b]}	4:48
7.	"St. Tropez"	Cole; Mayfield Small; Andre Fischer; Dave Wolinski; Warren Griffin III; Jamali Carthorn; Danielle Hollis; Deon Williams; Dewayne Williams; Weldon Irvine; Jasmine Easterly; Ned Love; Josh Skils; Margaux Whitney	Cole	4:17
8.	"G.O.M.D."	Cole; Delroy Andrews; Deongelo Holmes; Eric Jackson; Jonathan Smith	Cole	5:01
9.	"No Role Modelz"	Cole; Darius Barnes; Marvin Whitemon; Paul Beauregard; Jordan Houston; Tenina Stevens; Earl Stevens; Dannell Stevens; Brandt Jones	Phonix Beats; Cole^{[b]}	4:53
10.	"Hello"	Cole; Andrew Wansel; Jameel Roberts	Cole; Pop Wansel^{[a]}; J Proof^{[a]}	3:39
11.	"Apparently"	Cole; Filippo Trecca; Damany Coleman; Jeff Gitelman	Cole	4:53
12.	"Love Yourz"	Cole; Ramon Ibanga, Jr.; Carl McCormick; Calvin Price	Illmind	3:31
13.	"Note to Self"	Cole; Ronald Gilmore	Cole^{[a]}; Gilmore^{[a]}	14:35
Total length:				64:40

10 Year Anniversary bonus disc
No.	Title	Writer(s)	Producer(s)	Length
14.	"Home Soon"	Cole; Grover Washington Jr.	Cole	3:09
15.	"Die Together"	Cole; Lee Hatim	Cole	3:44
16.	"Judgement Day"	Cole; Wansel; Boris Karadimchev; Ronald Colson	Pop Wansel; Colson	3:14
17.	"Winter Wonderland"	Cole; Beau Dozier	Cole	3:04
18.	"Keep Heaven Dancing"	Cole; Frank Metis; Walter Nadel	Cole	4:06
19.	"Miles" (featuring Bone Thugs-n-Harmony)	Cole; Byron McCane; Anthony Henderson; Dacoury Natche	DJ Dahi	6:01
20.	"Black Man in Hollywood"	Cole; Jerry Williams, Jr.	Cole	2:58
21.	"Obviously"	Cole	Cole	3:41
Total length:				94:37

Notes

- ^{^[a]} signifies a co-producer
- ^{^[b]} signifies an additional producer
- "January 28th" contains additional vocals by Kaye Fox
- "A Tale of 2 Citiez" contains additional background vocals by Kaye Fox, T.S. Rose Desandies, and Yolanda Renee
- "St. Tropez" contains additional background vocals by T.S. Rose Desandies
- "No Role Modelz" contains additional background vocals by Kaye Fox
- "Hello" contains additional background vocals by Kaye Fox
- "Note to Self" contains additional vocals by T.S. Rose Desandies and Yolanda Renee
- "Home Soon" contains additional vocals by Kaye Fox

Sample credits

- "January 28th" contains a sample of "Sky Restaurant", written by Yumi Arai and Kunihiko Murai, and performed by Hi-Fi Set.
- "Wet Dreamz" contains a sample of "Mariya", written by Charles Simmons and performed by Family Circle; and a sample of "Impeach the President", written by Roy Hammond and performed by The Honey Drippers.
- "03' Adolescence" contains a sample of "Here's That Rainy Day", written by Johnny Burke and Jimmy Van Heuse, and performed by Sonia Rosa and Yuji Ono.
- "Fire Squad" contains a sample of "Heart Breaker", written by Mark Farner and performed by Aguaturbia.
- "St. Tropez" contains a sample of "That's All Right With Me", written by Mayfield Small and performed by Esther Phillips; and a sample of "Sister Sanctified", performed by Stanley Turrentine and Milt Jackson; and contains an interpolation of "Hollywood", written by Andre Fischer and Dave Wolinski, and performed by Rufus and Chaka Khan.
- "G.O.M.D." embodies a portion of "Get Low", written by Deongelo Holmes, Eric Jackson and Jonathan Smith, and performed by Lil Jon & the East Side Boyz featuring Ying Yang Twins; and a sample of "Berta, Berta", written by Delroy Andrews and performed by Branford Marsalis.
- "No Role Modelz" contains a sample of "Don't Save Her", written by Marvin Whitemon, Paul Beauregard, Jordan Houston, Tenina Stevens, Earl Stevens, Dannell Stevens and Brandt Jones, and performed by Project Pat.
- "Apparently" contains a sample of "La Morte Dell'ermina", written and performed by Filippo Trecca; and a sample of "CB#5", written and performed by Carlos Bess.
- "Home Soon" contains a sample from "Moonstreams", written and performed by Grover Washington Jr.
- "Die Together" contains a sample from "It's a Terrible Thing to Waste Your Love", written by Lee Hatim and performed by The Masqueraders.
- "Winter Wonderland" contains a sample from "Intermission", written and performed by Lamont Dozier.

== Personnel ==
Credits for 2014 Forest Hills Drive adapted from AllMusic.

- Jermaine Cole – primary artist, producer
- Mark Pitts – executive producer
- Ramon Ibanga, Jr. – producer
- Anderson Hernandez – producer
- William "Willie B" Brown – producer
- Pop Wansel – producer
- Darius Barnes – producer
- Ronald Gilmore – additional production, bass, keyboards, producer
- J Proof – producer
- Juro "Mez" Davis – engineer, mixing
- Nate Jones – bass
- David Linaburg – guitar
- Nate Alford – engineer
- Travis Antoine – trumpet
- Anthony Blasko – photography
- Felton Brown – art direction, graphic design
- James Casey – saxophone
- Chargaux – strings
- Jeremy Cimino – assistant engineer
- Damone Coleman – sampling
- T.S. Rose Desandies – vocals (background)
- DJ Dahi – beats
- Dreamville Records – executive producer
- Kaye Fox – vocals (background)
- Jeff Gitelman – guitar
- Justin Thomas Kay – art direction, graphic design
- Sean Kellett – assistant engineer
- Raphael Lee – string engineer
- Nuno Malo – strings
- Jack Mason – horn engineer
- Carl McCormick – instrumentation
- Nervous Reck – sampling
- Calvin Price – instrumentation
- Yolanda Renee – vocals (background)
- Roc Nation – executive producer
- James Rodgers – trombone (bass)
- Adam Rodney – creative director
- Team Titans – additional production
- Andre "Dré Charles" Thomas – additional production
- Timothy "Nick Paradise" Thomas – additional production

== Charts ==
=== Weekly charts ===
2014–2016 chart performance for 2014 Forest Hills Drive
Chart (2014–2016)	Peak position
Australian Albums (ARIA)	40
Belgian Albums (Ultratop Flanders)	134
Belgian Albums (Ultratop Wallonia)	198
Canadian Albums (Billboard)	3
New Zealand Albums (RMNZ)	25
Swiss Albums (Schweizer Hitparade)	49
Swedish Albums (Sverigetopplistan)	56
UK Albums (Official Charts)	33
UK R&B Albums (Official Charts)	1
US Billboard 200	1
US Top R&B/Hip-Hop Albums (Billboard)	1

2017–2024 chart performance for 2014 Forest Hills Drive
Chart (2017–2025)	Peak position
Greek Albums (IFPI)	36
Latvian Albums (LaIPA)	32
Lithuanian Albums (AGATA)	28
Nigerian Albums (TurnTable)	85
Norwegian Albums (VG-lista)	34

=== Year-end charts ===
2015 year-end chart performance for 2014 Forest Hills Drive
Chart (2015)	Position
Australian Urban Albums (ARIA)	28
Canadian Albums (Billboard)	36
US Billboard 200	8
US Top R&B/Hip-Hop Albums (Billboard)	2

2016 year-end chart performance for 2014 Forest Hills Drive
Chart (2016)	Position
Danish Albums (Hitlisten)	81
US Billboard 200	30
US Top R&B/Hip-Hop Albums (Billboard)	15

2017 year-end chart performance for 2014 Forest Hills Drive
Chart (2017)	Position
Danish Albums (Hitlisten)	82
Swedish Albums (Sverigetopplistan)	99
US Billboard 200	57
US Top R&B/Hip-Hop Albums (Billboard)	34

2018 year-end chart performance for 2014 Forest Hills Drive
Chart (2018)	Position
US Billboard 200	87
US Top R&B/Hip-Hop Albums (Billboard)	55

2019 year-end chart performance for 2014 Forest Hills Drive
Chart (2019)	Position
Latvian Albums (LAIPA)	44
US Billboard 200	91
US Top R&B/Hip-Hop Albums (Billboard)	89

2020 year-end chart performance for 2014 Forest Hills Drive
Chart (2020)	Position
US Billboard 200	96

2021 year-end chart performance for 2014 Forest Hills Drive
Chart (2021)	Position
Icelandic Albums (Tónlistinn)	80
US Billboard 200	62
US Top R&B/Hip-Hop Albums (Billboard)	33

2022 year-end chart performance for 2014 Forest Hills Drive
Chart (2022)	Position
Icelandic Albums (Tónlistinn)	69
Lithuanian Albums (AGATA)	42
US Billboard 200	70
US Top R&B/Hip-Hop Albums (Billboard)	34

2023 year-end chart performance for 2014 Forest Hills Drive
Chart (2023)	Position
Icelandic Albums (Tónlistinn)	52
US Billboard 200	51
US Top R&B/Hip-Hop Albums (Billboard)	20

2024 year-end chart performance for 2014 Forest Hills Drive
Chart (2024)	Position
US Billboard 200	82
US Top R&B/Hip-Hop Albums (Billboard)	28

2025 year-end chart performance for 2014 Forest Hills Drive
Chart (2025)	Position
US Billboard 200	92
US Top R&B/Hip-Hop Albums (Billboard)	37

=== Decade-end charts ===
Decade-end chart performance for 2014 Forest Hills Drive
Chart (2010–2019)	Position
US Billboard 200	80

== Certifications ==
Certifications for 2014 Forest Hills Drive
Region	Certification	Certified units/sales
Australia (ARIA)	Platinum	70,000^{‡}
Canada (Music Canada)	Gold	40,000^{^}
Denmark (IFPI Danmark)	2× Platinum	40,000^{‡}
United Kingdom (BPI)	Platinum	300,000^{‡}
United States (RIAA)	6× Platinum	6,000,000^{‡}
^{^} Shipments figures based on certification alone.^{‡} Sales+streaming figures based on certification alone.

== Release history ==
Release formats for 2014 Forest Hills Drive
Region	Date	Label(s)	Format(s)	Ref.
Australia	December 9, 2014	Columbia; Roc Nation; Universal	CD; digital download	
Canada	December 9, 2014	Columbia; Roc Nation; Universal	CD; digital download	
Germany	December 9, 2014	Columbia; Roc Nation; Universal	CD; digital download	
Ireland	December 9, 2014	Columbia; Roc Nation; Universal	CD; digital download	
Japan	December 9, 2014	Columbia; Roc Nation; Universal	CD; digital download	
New Zealand	December 9, 2014	Columbia; Roc Nation; Universal	CD; digital download	
United Kingdom	December 9, 2014	Columbia; Roc Nation; Universal	CD; digital download	
United States	December 9, 2014	Columbia; Roc Nation; Universal	CD; digital download	

== See also ==
- J. Cole: Road to Homecoming
- Forest Hills Drive: Live
- 2014 in hip hop music
- List of Billboard 200 number-one albums of 2014
- List of Billboard number-one R&B/hip-hop albums of 2014
