= J. Cole: 4 Your Eyez Only =

2017 documentary directed by J. Cole

- Directed by: J. Cole; Scott Lazer
- Starring: J. Cole
- Original language: English

Production
- Producers: Tim Grant; Jermaine Cole (exec.); Ibrahim Hamad (exec.); Adam Roy Rodney (exec.)
- Cinematography: Isiah Donté Lee
- Running time: 49 minutes

Original release
- Release: April 15, 2017

J. Cole: 4 Your Eyez Only is a documentary directed by J. Cole and Scott Lazer, and produced by Cole, Tim Grant, Ibrahim Hamad and Adam Roy Rodney. It premiered on April 15, 2017 on HBO.

== Premise ==
Incorporating music from the album 4 Your Eyez Only, Cole captured stories of residents in Baton Rouge, Louisiana, Atlanta, Georgia, Ferguson, Missouri, his father's hometown, Jonesboro, Arkansas and his hometown, Fayetteville, North Carolina. Entertainment Weekly reported, "The documentary promises to illustrate how their struggles over viable housing, voting laws for felons, integration, and more mirror the frustrations felt across the nation." The documentary included security camera footage of a SWAT raid that took place on March 18, 2016 at Cole's North Carolina home studio, which served as inspiration for the track "Neighbors". Cole also previewed new music in the documentary. Cole spoke about the documentary with The New York Times saying:

I felt like it would be mad powerful for black people to see black people talking to each other. And you see a rapper who’s considered one of the biggest in the game, just listening. These are people that never get to be heard, by the world or even by each other. That lack of representation can lead to potentially catastrophic misunderstandings.

== Release ==
On March 24, 2017 HBO announced their second documentary with Cole titled, J. Cole: 4 Your Eyez Only, following Forest Hills Drive: Homecoming in 2016. The documentary aired April 15, 2017 on HBO and HBO Now. The documentary was exclusively screened at the Troxy in London on April 19, 2017. On May 1, 2017 the film was uploaded on Dreamville's YouTube channel.

== Reception ==
=== Critical response ===
Writing for Billboard, J'na Jefferson praised the film saying it "brings black perseverance to the forefront".

=== Accolades ===
Award	Category	Result
NAMIC Vision Awards	Original Movie or Special	Nominated

== See also ==
- Eyez
