= Billboard Music Award for Top Rap Album =

Annual American music award

This is a list of winners and nominees of the Billboard Music Award for Top Rap Album. Notable winners include The Marshall Mathers LP 2, Recovery, and Views. Eminem and Drake are the only rappers to have won the award more than once. As of 2022, Nicki Minaj is the only female rapper to win this award, winning for her second studio album, Pink Friday: Roman Reloaded in 2013.

== Winners and Nominees ==
Winners are listed first and highlighted in bold.

=== 2000s ===
Year	Album	Artist	Ref.
2006	**King**	**T.I.**	
2006	Curtain Call: The Hits	Eminem	
2006	Tha Carter II	Lil Wayne	
2007-9	—N/a		

=== 2010s ===
Year	Album	Artist	Ref.
2010	—N/a		
2011	**Recovery**	**Eminem**	
2011	I Am Not a Human Being	Lil Wayne	
2011	My Beautiful Dark Twisted Fantasy	Kanye West	
2011	Pink Friday	Nicki Minaj	
2011	Thank Me Later	Drake	
2012	**Tha Carter IV**	**Lil Wayne**	
2012	Hell: The Sequel	Eminem and Royce Da 5'9	
2012	Sorry for Party Rocking	LMFAO	
2012	Take Care	Drake	
2012	Watch the Throne	Kanye West and Jay Z	
2013	**Pink Friday: Roman Reloaded**	**Nicki Minaj**	
2013	Based on a T.R.U. Story	2 Chainz	
2013	God Forgives, I Don't	Rick Ross	
2013	Good Kid, M.A.A.D City	Kendrick Lamar	
2013	The Heist	Macklemore & Ryan Lewis	
2014	**The Marshall Mathers LP 2**	**Eminem**	
2014	Born Sinner	J. Cole	
2014	Magna Carta Holy Grail	Jay Z	
2014	Nothing Was the Same	Drake	
2014	The Heist	Macklemore & Ryan Lewis	
2015	**2014 Forest Hills Drive**	**J. Cole**	
2015	If You're Reading This It's Too Late	Drake	
2015	The Marshall Mathers LP 2	Eminem	
2015	The New Classic	Iggy Azalea	
2015	The Pinkprint	Nicki Minaj	
2016	**Dreams Worth More Than Money**	**Meek Mill**	
2016	Compton	Dr. Dre	
2016	If You’re Reading This It’s Too Late	Drake	
2016	To Pimp A Butterfly	Kendrick Lamar	
2016	What A Time To Be Alive	Drake & Future	
2017	**Views**	**Drake**	
2017	4 Your Eyez Only	J. Cole	
2017	Islah	Kevin Gates	
2017	Major Key	DJ Khaled	
2017	We Got It from Here... Thank You 4 Your Service	A Tribe Called Quest	
2018	**Damn**	**Kendrick Lamar**	
2018	Culture	Migos	
2018	Luv Is Rage 2	Lil Uzi Vert	
2018	More Life	Drake	
2018	Stoney	Post Malone	
2019	**Scorpion**	**Drake**	
2019	?	XXXTentacion	
2019	Astroworld	Travis Scott	
2019	Beerbongs & Bentleys	Post Malone	
2019	Invasion of Privacy	Cardi B	

=== 2020s ===
Year	Album	Artist	Ref.
2020	**Hollywood's Bleeding**	**Post Malone**	
2020	Death Race for Love	Juice Wrld	
2020	Kirk	DaBaby	
2020	Please Excuse Me for Being Antisocial	Roddy Ricch	
2020	So Much Fun	Young Thug	
2021	**Shoot for the Stars, Aim for the Moon**	**Pop Smoke**	
2021	Blame It on Baby	DaBaby	
2021	Eternal Atake	Lil Uzi Vert	
2021	Legends Never Die	Juice Wrld	
2021	My Turn	Lil Baby	
2022	**Certified Lover Boy**	**Drake**	
2022	A Gangsta's Pain	Moneybagg Yo	
2022	Donda	Kanye West	
2022	F*ck Love	The Kid Laroi	
2022	SoulFly	Rod Wave	
2023	**Her Loss**	**Drake and 21 Savage**	
2023	Heroes & Villains	Metro Boomin	
2023	I Never Liked You	Future	
2023	It's Only Me	Lil Baby	
2023	Utopia	Travis Scott	
2024	**For All the Dogs**	**Drake**	
2024	American Dream	21 Savage	
2024	Nostalgia	Rod Wave	
2024	Pink Friday 2	Nicki Minaj	
2024	We Don't Trust You	Future and Metro Boomin	

== Multiple wins and nominations ==
=== Wins ===
Rank	Artist	Awards won	Years won
1	Drake	5	2017, 2019, 2022, 2023 and 2024
2	Eminem	2	2011 and 2014

=== Nominations ===
Nominations	Artist
11	Drake
5	Eminem
4	Nicki Minaj
3	Lil Wayne
3	Post Malone
2	DaBaby
2	Future
2	Jay Z
2	Juice Wrld
2	J. Cole
2	Kendrick Lamar
2	Macklemore & Ryan Lewis
2	Ryan Lewis
2	Lil Baby
2	Lil Uzi Vert
2	Macklemore
2	Travis Scott
2	Kanye West
