= The Come Up =

Mixtape by J. Cole
- Released: May 4, 2007
- Genre: Hip hop
- Length: 65:25
- Label: By Any Means Management
- Producers: J. Cole; Large Professor; Kanye West; Just Blaze; Salaam Remi; Mathematics; Ski Beatz

J. Cole chronology
The Come Up (2007)	The Warm Up (2009)

Singles from The Come Up
- 1. "Simba" Released: 2007

The Come Up Mixtape Vol. 1 (simply known as The Come Up) is the debut mixtape by rapper J. Cole released on May 4, 2007, hosted by DJ OnPoint. The mixtape was downloaded and streamed over 500,000 times, while being viewed over 1,800,000 times on the mixtape site DatPiff.

On November 19, 2024, the mixtape was re-released onto streaming platforms, accompanying the first episode release of Cole's audio podcast series Inevitable, which focused on this mixtape. The streaming release omits a few tracks including "Mighty Crazy", "Get It", and "I Do My Thing".

== Background ==
J. Cole self-produced 12 out of the 21 tracks on the mixtape, including his debut single, called "Simba", for which Cole shot his first music video. The mixtape also features the samples from American rappers such as Kanye West, Nas, Jay-Z, and Ghostface Killah, among others, while the tape includes guest appearances from Deacon and Nervous Reck.

== Track listing ==
All tracks are written and produced by Jermaine Cole except where noted.

No.	Title	Writer(s)	Producer(s)	Length
1.	"Intro"			0:54
2.	"Simba"			3:23
3.	"I'm the Man"		Large Professor	2:56
4.	"School Daze"		Kanye West	3:52
5.	"Dollar and a Dream"		Just Blaze	4:36
6.	"Throw It Up"			3:38
7.	"Quote Me"		Salaam Remi	2:25
8.	"College Boy"		West	5:04
9.	"Split You Up"			3:12
10.	"Plain" (skit)			1:30
11.	"The Come Up"		West	2:11
12.	"Mighty Crazy"		Mathematics	1:22
13.	"Dead Presidents"		Ski	3:09
14.	"Lil' Ghetto Nigga"			3:10
15.	"Homecoming"		West	1:56
16.	"Carolina On My Mind" (featuring Deacon)			3:41
17.	"Can't Cry"			4:15
18.	"Goin' Off"			2:49
19.	"Rags to Riches (At the Beep)"			4:48
20.	"Get It" (bonus track)			3:37
21.	"I Do My Thing" (performed by Nervous Reck - bonus track)	Nervous Reck		2:42
Total length:				65:25

Sample credits

- "I'm the Man" samples "You're da Man" by Nas.
- "School Daze" samples "Ghetto" by Smitty featuring Scarface, Kanye West, and John Legend.
- "Dollar and a Dream" samples "Mom Praying" by Beanie Sigel featuring Scarface.
- "Quote Me" samples "Where Y'all At" by Nas.
- "College Boy" samples "Came Back for You" by Lil' Kim.
- "The Come Up" samples "Grammy Family" by Consequence featuring DJ Khaled, Kanye West, and John Legend.
- "Mighty Crazy" samples "Mighty Healthy" by Ghostface Killah.
- "Dead Presidents" samples "Dead Presidents" by Jay-Z.
- "Homecoming" samples "My Way Home" by Kanye West featuring Common.
- "Carolina On My Mind" samples "We the People Who Are Darker Than Blue" by Curtis Mayfield.
- "Can't Cry" samples "(If Loving You Is Wrong) I Don't Want to Be Right" by Millie Jackson.
- "Goin' Off" samples "If Tomorrow Never Comes" by The Controllers.
- "Rags to Riches" samples "Everybody Loves the Sunshine" by Roy Ayers.
