= Applying Pressure: The Off-Season Documentary =

2021 film directed by Scott Lazer

- Directed by: Scott Lazer
- Produced by: Tripp Kramer & David Peters
- Starring: J. Cole; 21 Savage; Ibrahim Hamad; Mike Shaw; Morray
- Cinematography: Taylor McIntosh
- Distributed by: Dreamville Films
- Release date: May 10, 2021
- Running time: 13 minutes
- Language: English

Applying Pressure: The Off-Season Documentary is a 2021 documentary short film based on creation of J. Cole's sixth studio album The Off-Season. It was released on May 10, 2021, by Dreamville on YouTube. It was directed by Dreamville Ventures' in-house director Scott Lazer, and produced by Tripp Kramer and David Peters.

== Premise ==
The short film is divided into four chapters: "Comfort is the Enemy", "Father Time", "The Climb Back", and "Applying Pressure". Cole shares a behind the scenes look in the studio as well as private moments during the album's creating process. The film also stars American rapper 21 Savage interviewing Cole. In the first two chapters, Cole speaks about adjusting work schedule and fighting complacency after becoming a father. In the third and fourth chapters, Cole talks about the inspiration of the album, talking about having writer's block and comparing his hip hop career to playing basketball.

== Release ==
On May 9, 2021, Cole released the official trailer for the documentary titled, Applying Pressure: The Off-Season, on social media. The documentary was released on May 10, distributed on Dreamville's YouTube channel. While describing the inspiration of the album, Cole said in the documentary:

This is the moment that a lot of your favorite rappers hit a crossroads. Are you okay with getting comfortable? I had to make a real decision: Are you okay with getting comfortable, chilling, mailing it in, waiting around on inspiration? If this is as high as you ever got—not career success-wise, but from a skill level, like have you wrote your best songs. Did you leave no stone unturned creatively? And when I thought about that feeling, I was like, 'Nah, I'm not cool with that.'

== Reception ==
Writing for Billboard, Jordan Rose wrote about how the birth of Cole's son impacted the way he approached music. Cole reflected on advice he received from Pharrell Williams in 2011, talking about balancing studio recording sessions to a routine that allows him to spend time with his family. Rose also wrote about Cole returning to his roots after Cole returned to his college home in Queens, New York in 2016, where he lived while attending St. John's University. The author wrote about the parallels between music and basketball in his work such as The Warm Up, Friday Night Lights, and Cole World: The Sideline Story, saying "it looks like Cole is finally back in competitive form, and is getting his shot at the pros while simultaneously plotting his return to rap dominance," and "that hunger was palpable in the music, and as he describes in the documentary, he wants to reignite that feeling."

== Release history ==
List of showing region, release dates, format(s), label(s) and reference(s)
Region	Date	Format	Label	Ref.
Various	May 10, 2021	streaming	Dreamville	

== See also ==
- The Off-Season
