= G.O.M.D. =

Song by J. Cole

from the album 2014 Forest Hills Drive
- Released: December 9, 2014
- Recorded: 2014
- Genre: Hip hop
- Length: 5:01
- Label: Columbia
- Songwriters: Jermaine Cole, D. Andrews, D. Holmes, E. Jackson, J. Smith
- Producer: J. Cole

"G.O.M.D." is a song by American rapper J. Cole, from his third studio album, 2014 Forest Hills Drive. The song, an acronym for the statement "Get Off My Dick", interpolates "Get Low" by Lil Jon and samples "Berta, Berta" by Branford Marsalis, and was produced by Cole.

"G.O.M.D." received mixed reviews from critics who argued over its production and lyrical content. The song peaked at number 34 on the Billboard Hot R&B/Hip-Hop Songs chart. It was planned for the song to be released as the lead single from the album in December 2014, but it was replaced by "Apparently". A music video for the song directed by Lawrence Lamont was still released in March 2015 and is a period piece that features Cole as a house slave to a white-owned plantation.

== Critical reception ==
"G.O.M.D." received mixed reviews from music critics. Marshall Gu of PopMatters said that it has "the most inspired beat on the album," but was put off by the lyric that's similar to Jay Z's verse on "Drunk in Love". Craig Jenkins of Pitchfork Media highlighted it alongside "Fire Squad" and "A Tale of 2 Citiez" for displaying Cole's technical delivery. Martín Caballero of USA Today was critical of the track, putting it alongside "St. Tropez" and "No Role Modelz" for their lackluster production techniques and delivery of concept, saying they "become so bloated and desperate to be taken seriously they stop being fun."

== Music video ==
Directed by Lawrence Lamont, the video for "G.O.M.D." is a period piece, where Cole portrays a house slave who causes an uprising against a white-owned plantation. On March 23, 2015, the video was released on Cole's Vevo channel. Cole had the concept in mind for two years, originally wanting it for the Born Sinner track "Chaining Day" and Hype Williams as the video's director. On the video's message, Cole stated that it went beyond racism and that it was about bringing the black community together in their united struggle against oppression.

== Charts ==
Chart (2015)	Peak position
US Bubbling Under Hot 100 (Billboard)	9
US Hot R&B/Hip-Hop Songs (Billboard)	34

== Certifications ==
Region	Certification	Certified units/sales
Denmark (IFPI Danmark)	Gold	45,000^{‡}
United Kingdom (BPI)	Gold	400,000^{‡}
United States (RIAA)	4× Platinum	4,000,000^{‡}
^{‡} Sales+streaming figures based on certification alone.
