= Forest Hills Drive: Homecoming =

- Directed by: Scott Lazer
- Starring: J. Cole
- Country of origin: United States
- Original language: English

Production
- Producers: Richard Clark Jr. Tim Grant; Jon Muedder; Adam Roy Rodney (exec.)
- Cinematography: Ben Premeaux
- Editors: Valeria Gualdi; Oliver Riley-Smith; Alicia Hedley; Maria Simone Williams
- Running time: 84 minutes

Original release
- Network: HBO
- Release: January 9, 2016

Forest Hills Drive: Homecoming is a concert film about American rapper J. Cole covering his 2015 show at the Crown Coliseum in Fayetteville, North Carolina. It aired on January 9, 2016, on HBO and HBO Now, and includes guest appearances from Jay Z, Drake, and Big Sean.

== Premise ==
The film took place during his Forest Hills Drive Tour at his fall 2015. The film serves as the fifth installment of the documentary series J. Cole: Road to Homecoming.

== Reception ==
=== Critical response ===
Billboard called J. Cole a "fitting hometown hero" saying "while Cole places himself at the center of the Scott Lazer-directed production, he's not the star, instead choosing to cede the narrative to his hometown of Fayetteville." Revolt praised the director saying "Lazer masterfully weaved Cole's personal story and the 2014 Forest Hills Drive homecoming concert together throughout the film."

== Music ==
On January 28, 2016, Cole released Forest Hills Drive: Live as well as the music video for "Love Yourz", which were recorded in the live concert film.

== Personnel ==
- Juro Mez Davis – music mixer
- Elad Marish – re-recording mixer
- Joel Raabe – re-recording mixer
- Raymond Rogers – music mixer
- Sam Kim – assistant camera
- Steven C. Pitts – camera operator
- Robert Crosby – colorist
- Alicia Hedley – assistant editor
- Rik Michul – post producer
- Christopher Spindelilus – post production supervisor
- Maria Simone Williams – assistant editor
