= Wet Dreamz =

Single by J. Cole

from the album 2014 Forest Hills Drive
- Released: April 14, 2015
- Recorded: 2014
- Genre: Hip hop; R&B; chipmunk soul
- Length: 3:59
- Label: Dreamville; Roc Nation; Columbia
- Songwriters: Jermaine Cole; Charles Simmons; Roy Charles Hammond
- Producer: J. Cole

J. Cole singles chronology
"Planez" (2015)	"Wet Dreamz" (2015)	"No Sleeep" (2015)

Music video
- "Wet Dreamz" on YouTube

"Wet Dreamz" is a 2015 song by American rapper J. Cole. It was released on 14th of April 2015, as the second single from his third studio album, 2014 Forest Hills Drive. The song samples "Mariya" by Family Circle and the 1973 song "Impeach the President" by The Honey Drippers, and was produced by Cole himself. As of 2024, the single has officially been certified 9-times platinum by the Recording Industry Association of America (RIAA).

== Music video ==
On April 21, 2015, the accompanying video for "Wet Dreamz" was released on Cole's Vevo channel. It uses a pair of dogs to humorously represent the lyrics of the song, with the ending revealing they both belong to presumably J. Cole and the girl he wants to have sex with.

== Charts ==
Chart performance for "Wet Dreamz"
Chart (2015)	Peak position
US Billboard Hot 100	61
US Hot R&B/Hip-Hop Songs (Billboard)	16

== Certifications ==
Certifications for "Wet Dreamz"
Region	Certification	Certified units/sales
Australia (ARIA)	4× Platinum	280,000^{‡}
Denmark (IFPI Danmark)	2× Platinum	180,000^{‡}
New Zealand (RMNZ)	8× Platinum	240,000^{‡}
United Kingdom (BPI)	2× Platinum	1,200,000^{‡}
United States (RIAA)	9× Platinum	9,000,000^{‡}
^{‡} Sales+streaming figures based on certification alone.
