= No Role Modelz =

Single by J. Cole

from the album 2014 Forest Hills Drive
- Released: August 4, 2015
- Recorded: 2014
- Genre: Hip hop
- Length: 4:53: 4:17 (radio edit)
- Label: Dreamville; Roc Nation; Columbia; Vinyl Crown
- Songwriters: Jermaine Cole; Kurtis Figueroa; Darius Barnes; M. Whitemon; Paul Beauregard; Saint Cassius; Jordan Houston; Tenina Stevens; Earl Stevens; D. Stevens; B. Jones
- Producer: Phonix Beats

J. Cole singles chronology
"No Sleeep" (2015)	"No Role Modelz" (2015)	"Love Yourz" (2016)

Audio video
- "No Role Modelz" on YouTube

"No Role Modelz" is a song by American rapper J. Cole. It was released through Dreamville Records, Roc Nation, Columbia Records, and Vinyl Crown as the third single from his third studio album, 2014 Forest Hills Drive, on August 4, 2015. The song was produced by Phonix Beats with additional production from Cole, and interpolates "Don't Save Her" by Project Pat. The song has been referred as one of J. Cole's biggest songs.

The song received generally mixed reviews from critics. During the week of December 22, 2015, the song reached number 36 on the Billboard Hot 100, giving Cole his fourth top 40 hit as a solo artist and the highest-charting single from 2014 Forest Hills Drive. On May 20, 2016, the single was officially certified platinum by the Recording Industry Association of America (RIAA), making it the first song to do so without a music video. On December 10, 2024, the song was certified RIAA Diamond selling over 14 million copies, giving him his second and highest Diamond certification and is one of the best-selling digital singles of all-time.

== Lyrics ==
The song samples a speech from former United States President George W. Bush that was delivered at Pledge Across America in Nashville, Tennessee on September 17, 2002. In the speech, Bush was unable to fully recall the proverb "fool me once, shame on you; fool me twice, shame on me", stating "There's an old saying in Tennessee; I know it's in Texas, probably in Tennessee; that says, "Fool me once, shame on… shame on you." Fool me… you can't get fooled again." The exact quote appears during an interlude in the song, followed by the bridge in which Cole raps "Fool me one time, shame on you / Fool me twice, can't put the blame on you / Fool me three times, fuck the peace signs / Load the chopper, let it rain on you", with the bridge then repeated once more.

== Critical reception ==
"No Role Modelz" received mixed reviews from music critics. Craig Jenkins of Pitchfork wrote that "No Role Modelz" parlays a suspicion about a hook-up being a golddigger into a tirade about reality TV women lacking respectable public figures crudely suggesting that "she's shallow but the pussy deep." Jenkins wrote that 2014 Forest Hills Drive "often plays at a depth it never delivers." Billboard called the song "one of the decade's great rap internet tropes", adding to their list of the 100 songs that defined the 2010s.

== Charts ==
=== Weekly charts ===
2015–2016 weekly chart performance for "No Role Modelz"
Chart (2015–2016)	Peak position
Canada Hot 100 (Billboard)	62
US Billboard Hot 100	36
US Hot R&B/Hip-Hop Songs (Billboard)	27
US Rhythmic Airplay (Billboard)	14

2020–2026 weekly chart performance for "No Role Modelz"
Chart (2020–2026)	Peak position
Australia (ARIA)	40
Global 200 (Billboard)	97
Iceland (Tónlistinn)	32
Latvia (LAIPA)	13
Lithuania (AGATA)	50
Netherlands (Single Tip)	13
New Zealand (Recorded Music NZ)	22
Norway (IFPI Norge)	62
Portugal (AFP)	114
Slovakia (Singles Digitál Top 100)	85
South Africa (RISA)	67
Sweden Heatseeker (Sverigetopplistan)	13
US Hot R&B/Hip-Hop Songs (Billboard)	20
UK Hip Hop/R&B (Official Charts)	23

=== Year-end charts ===
2021 year-end chart performance for "No Role Modelz"
Chart (2021)	Position
Australia (ARIA)	89
Portugal (AFP)	178

2022 year-end chart performance for "No Role Modelz"
Chart (2022)	Position
Australia (ARIA)	41
Global 200 (Billboard)	97
Lithuania (AGATA)	70
New Zealand (Recorded Music NZ)	23

2023 year-end chart performance for "No Role Modelz"
Chart (2023)	Position
Australia (ARIA)	44
Global 200 (Billboard)	91
New Zealand (Recorded Music NZ)	22

2024 year-end chart performance for "No Role Modelz"
Chart (2024)	Position
Australia Hip Hop/R&B (ARIA)	23
Global 200 (Billboard)	199

== Credits and personnel ==
Credits adapted from Tidal.

- J. Cole – vocals, production, songwriting
- Darius "Phonix Beats" Barnes – production, songwriting
- Mark Pitts – production
- Brandt Jones – songwriting
- Danell Stevens – songwriting
- Darius Barnes – songwriting
- Patrick Earl houston – songwriting
- Jordan Houston – songwriting
- Marvin Whitenerom – songwriting
- Paul Beauregard – songwriting
- Tenina Stevens – songwriting
- Kaye Fox – additional vocals, associated performer
- Sean Kellett – assistant recording engineering, studio personnel
- Brian Gardner – mastering
- Juro "Mez" Davis – mixing, recording engineering

== Certifications ==
Certifications for "No Role Modelz"
Region	Certification	Certified units/sales
Australia (ARIA)	6× Platinum	420,000^{‡}
Brazil (Pro-Música Brasil)	Gold	30,000^{‡}
Denmark (IFPI Danmark)	3× Platinum	270,000^{‡}
Germany (BVMI)	Platinum	600,000^{‡}
Italy (FIMI)	Platinum	100,000^{‡}
New Zealand (RMNZ)	12× Platinum	360,000^{‡}
Portugal (AFP)	4× Platinum	40,000^{‡}
Spain (Promusicae)	Gold	30,000^{‡}
United Kingdom (BPI)	4× Platinum	2,400,000^{‡}
United States (RIAA)	14× Platinum	14,000,000^{‡}
Streaming
Greece (IFPI Greece)	3× Platinum	6,000,000^{†}
^{‡} Sales+streaming figures based on certification alone.^{†} Streaming-only figures based on certification alone.

== See also ==
- List of best-selling singles in the United States
