= Apparently =

Single by J. Cole

from the album 2014 Forest Hills Drive
- Released: December 9, 2014
- Recorded: 2014
- Genre: Hip hop
- Length: 4:53
- Label: Columbia
- Songwriters: Jermaine Cole, Filippo Trecca
- Producer: J. Cole

J. Cole singles chronology
"She Knows" (2013)	"Apparently" (2014)	"Planez" (2015)

Audio sample
- file; help

Music video
- "Apparently" on YouTube

"Apparently" is a song by American rapper J. Cole, released on December 9, 2014 as the lead single from his third studio album, 2014 Forest Hills Drive. The song samples "La Morte Dell'ermina" by Filippo Trecca, and was produced by J. Cole. The song has since peaked at number 58 and 17 on the Billboard Hot 100 and Hot R&B/Hip-Hop Songs charts, respectively. The song was nominated for Best Rap Performance for the 2016 Grammys.

== Music video ==
On December 10, 2014, the accompanying video for "Apparently" was released on Cole's Vevo channel. The video features several shots of Cole standing in front of various video projections.

== Charts ==
Chart (2015)	Peak position
US Billboard Hot 100	58
US Hot R&B/Hip-Hop Songs (Billboard)	17
US Rhythmic Airplay (Billboard)	9

== Certifications ==
Region	Certification	Certified units/sales
United Kingdom (BPI)	Silver	200,000^{‡}
United States (RIAA)	3× Platinum	3,000,000^{‡}
^{‡} Sales+streaming figures based on certification alone.
