= Love Yourz =

2016 single by J. Cole

Single by J. Cole

from the album 2014 Forest Hills Drive
- Released: February 27, 2016
- Recorded: 2014
- Genre: Conscious hip hop
- Length: 3:31
- Label: Columbia
- Songwriters: Jermaine Cole; Ramon Ibanga, Jr.; Carl McCormick; Calvin Price
- Producers: Illmind; Cardiak; CritaCal

J. Cole singles chronology
"No Role Modelz" (2015)	"Love Yourz" (2016)	"Everybody Dies" (2016)

Music video
- "Love Yourz" on YouTube

"Love Yourz" is a song by American rapper J. Cole, released on February 27, 2016, as the fourth single from his third studio album, 2014 Forest Hills Drive. The song was written alongside producers Illmind, Cardiak, and CritaCal. The song was certified Platinum by the Recording Industry Association of America (RIAA), selling over 1,000,000 units in the United States.

== Music video ==
On Cole's 30th birthday, an official music video for "Love Yourz" was released onto YouTube on January 28, 2015. On his 31st birthday, Cole released the live music video for "Love Yourz" on January 28, 2016, along with a surprise live album, Forest Hills Drive: Live. The music video was filmed during his Forest Hills Drive Tour, and was also featured in his HBO documentary, Forest Hills Drive: Homecoming on January 9, 2015.

== Charts ==
Chart performance for "Love Yourz"
Chart (2016)	Peak position
US Hot R&B/Hip-Hop Songs (Billboard)	41
US Rhythmic Airplay (Billboard)	35

== Certifications ==
Certifications for "Love Yourz"
Region	Certification	Certified units/sales
Australia (ARIA)	Gold	35,000^{‡}
United Kingdom (BPI)	Gold	400,000^{‡}
United States (RIAA)	3× Platinum	3,000,000^{‡}
^{‡} Sales+streaming figures based on certification alone.
