= J. Cole: Road to Homecoming =

- Directed by: Scott Lazer
- Starring: J. Cole
- Original language: English
- No. of episodes: 5

Production
- Executive producer: Adam Roy Rodney
- Producers: Richard Clark Jr. Tim Grant; Jon Muedder
- Editors: Valeria Gualdi; Oliver Riley-Smith; Alicia Hedley; Maria Simone Williams

Original release
- Release: December 16, 2015 – January 9, 2016

J. Cole: Road to Homecoming is a 2015 mini-documentary series about American rapper J. Cole. The documentary series provides insight into the 2014 Forest Hills Drive album rollout, documents each act of the Forest Hills Drive Tour, and highlights of the 2015 Dollar & A Dream Tour.

== Premise ==
On December 15, 2015, Cole announced the mini-series which gives an intimate look at his creative process and the inner workings of his career. Upon the premiere date, J. Cole wrote:

This hour and a half special is actually the final piece of a 5 part mini-documentary series that we shot and edited at Dreamville Films this year. To keep it real, I'm just as excited about the first four episodes as i am the Homecoming film. These pieces all document some important moments from the last year of my life. [...] Once thing I know about myself is that I don't like to give too much of me outside of the music. I'm grateful of having my dream career of putting words together, flipping samples and making projects that make you feel something. With that said, I try to keep this relationship mostly about the music.

== Release ==
The first four episodes of the mini-series were released weekly, and included behind-the-scenes footage of the album's creation, music videos, and backstage on the tour. Guest appearances included Kendrick Lamar, Wale, ASAP Ferg and Rihanna. The fifth episode aired on January 9, as the concert film, Forest Hills Drive: Homecoming, covering his 2015 show at the Crown Coliseum in Fayetteville, North Carolina. All episodes were available for free on Vimeo until January 9.

== Episodes ==
No.	Title	Directed by	Original release date
1	"Fuck Money, Spread Love"	Scott Lazer	December 16, 2015
The first installment of a chronicle of the making of rapper J. Cole's third studio album, 2014 Forest Hills Drive, includes a surprise visit to Morehouse College and a listening session at his old home in Fayetteville, N.C.
2	"Ain't Nothin' Like That"	Scott Lazer	December 23, 2015
Cole gets his diploma from St. John's University in Queens seven years after he graduated because he never paid a fee for a library book. Also: a look at how a tour is planned.
3	"This Is What You Wanted"	Scott Lazer	December 30, 2015
The steps to booking a venue are chronicled. Also includes appearances by Kendrick Lamar, Rihanna and Wale.
4	"Buses, Vans, and Trains"	Scott Lazer	January 6, 2016
The final phases of the tour are put together, including the stage design and visual effects.
5	"Homecoming"	Scott Lazer	January 9, 2016
J. Cole returns to his hometown of Fayetteville, North Carolina for an endearing performance of his platinum selling album 2014 Forest Hills Drive.
