= J. Cole =

American rapper (born 1985)

- Cole performing in 2023
- Born: Jermaine Lamarr Cole; January 28, 1985 (age 41); Frankfurt, West Germany
- Other names: Therapist; Hollywood Cole; Kill Edward
- Education: St. John's University (BA)
- Occupations: Rapper; record producer; singer; songwriter; basketball player
- Years active: 2007–present
- Organization: Dreamville Ventures
- Works: Discography; filmography; production
- Spouse: Melissa Heholt (m. 2015)
- Children: 2
- Awards: Full list
- Musical career
- Origin: Fayetteville, North Carolina, U.S.
- Genre: Hip-hop
- Labels: Dreamville; Roc Nation; Interscope; Columbia; ByStorm
- Formerly of: All City Chess Club
- Website: www.dreamville.com
- Basketball career

Personal information
- Listed height: 6 ft 3 in (1.91 m)
- Listed weight: 185 lb (84 kg)

Career information
- High school: Terry Sanford (Fayetteville, North Carolina)
- Playing career: 2021–present
- Position: Shooting guard

Career history
- 2021: Patriots BBC
- 2022: Scarborough Shooting Stars
- 2026: Nanjing Monkey Kings

Jermaine Lamarr Cole (born January 28, 1985) is an American rapper and record producer. Born on a military base in Germany and raised in Fayetteville, North Carolina, Cole initially gained attention as a rapper following the release of his debut mixtape, The Come Up, in early 2007. He attended college in New York City with intent in furthering his musical career, and signed with Jay-Z's Roc Nation in 2009; the label released his next two mixtapes: The Warm Up (2009) and Friday Night Lights (2010), both of which earned him wider recognition.

Each of Cole's studio albums has peaked atop the US Billboard 200, beginning with his debut, Cole World: The Sideline Story (2011), and its follow-up, Born Sinner (2013). Both met with critical acclaim, the albums spawned the Billboard Hot 100-top 40 singles "Work Out", "Power Trip" (featuring Miguel), and "Crooked Smile" (featuring TLC). His subsequent albums—beginning with 2014 Forest Hills Drive (2014), 4 Your Eyez Only (2016), and KOD (2018)—have since explored more conscious and introspective subject matter; the latter featured a then-record six simultaneous top 20 hits on the Billboard Hot 100—the first time an album had done so since the Beatles in 1964. His sixth and seventh albums, The Off-Season (2021) and The Fall-Off (2026; marketed as his final album), both had several top-40 entries upon release, with the former's "My Life" (with 21 Savage and Morray) peaking at number two on the Billboard Hot 100. His guest appearances on the 2023 singles "All My Life" by Lil Durk and "First Person Shooter" by Drake, peaked at numbers two and one on the chart, respectively.

Self-taught on piano, Cole also acts as a producer alongside his recording career—having largely handled the production of his own projects—with credits on material for other artists, including Kendrick Lamar, Janet Jackson, Young Thug, Wale, and Mac Miller, among others. Cole's side ventures include his record label Dreamville Records, as well as its namesake media company and non-profit. The label, having signed artists including JID, Ari Lennox, Bas, and EarthGang, has released four compilation albums; their third, Revenge of the Dreamers III (2019), debuted atop the Billboard 200 and was nominated for Best Rap Album at the 62nd Annual Grammy Awards. In January 2015, Cole began housing single mothers rent-free at his childhood home in Fayetteville.

Cole has won two Grammy Awards from seventeen nominations, a Billboard Music Award for Top Rap Album, three Soul Train Music Awards, and eight BET Hip Hop Awards. Each of his albums—including Revenge of the Dreamers III—has received platinum certifications by the Recording Industry Association of America (RIAA). He is a minority owner of the Charlotte Hornets.

== Early life ==
Jermaine Lamarr Cole was born on January 28, 1985, at an American military base in Frankfurt, West Germany. His father, James Cole, is an African American veteran, who served in the US Army, and his mother, Kay, born in Michigan, is a white American who was a postal worker for the United States Postal Service. Cole's father later abandoned the family during his youth. At the age of eight months his mother moved with him and his older brother Zach to the United States, to Fayetteville, North Carolina. Cole grew up in a multi-ethnic environment, and when asked about how closely his ethnicity impacts him, Cole commented, "I can identify with white people, because I know my mother, her side of the family, who I love. But at the end of the day, [I've] never felt white. I can identify [with white people] but never have I felt like I'm one of them. I identify more with what I look like, because that's how I got treated [but] not necessarily in a negative way." During his youth, Cole expressed an affinity for basketball and music, and served as a first-chair violinist for the Terry Sanford Orchestra until 2003.

Cole began rapping at the age of twelve, and saw it as an ideal profession in 2000, when his mother purchased an ASR-X musical sampler as a Christmas gift. During this period, Cole heightened emphasis on improving his production skills, later beginning initial production under the pseudonym Therapist. Cole later collaborated with local group Bomm Sheltuh, rapping and producing as a member of the group. Cole can be seen in the crowd of the 2006 documentary Dave Chappelle's Block Party.

Upon graduating high school with a 4.2 GPA, Cole decided that his chances of securing a recording contract would be better in New York City. He moved there and accepted a scholarship to St. John's University. Initially majoring in computer science, Cole later switched to communications after witnessing the life of a lonely computer science professor. At the college, Cole was the president of Haraya, a pan-African student coalition. He graduated magna cum laude in 2007, with a 3.8 GPA. Despite graduating, Cole would officially receive his degree during a homecoming concert in 2015, revealing that he had owed money for a library book, causing the university to hold back from granting him his degree.

Cole later worked in various part-time jobs in Fayetteville, including a working ad salesman for a newspaper, a bill collector, a file clerk, and a kangaroo mascot at a skate rink.

His mother struggled with addiction after his stepfather left.

== Musical career ==
=== 1999–2008: Beginnings and early work ===
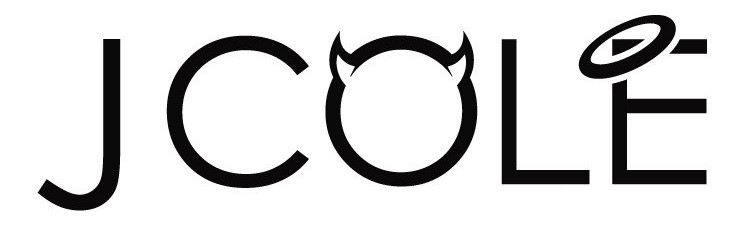
Logo used by J. Cole earlier in his career

After becoming musically inspired by Canibus, Nas, Tupac, and Eminem, Cole and his cousin worked on developing their basic understanding of rhyming and wordplay. As well as this, they began to learn how to interpolate storytelling within their lyrics. By 14, Cole had various notebooks filled with song ideas, however, was unable to produce beats further than sampling. Cole's mother later purchased him the Roland TR-808 drum machine in order to further Cole's understanding of production. Over the next three years, he began posting songs on various internet forums under the moniker Blaza, but later switched to the name Therapist.

Cole later expanded his production to create an entire CD's worth of instrumentals, and traveled to Roc the Mic Studio, hoping to play it for Jay Z while he was in recording sessions for American Gangster. Cole waited for over three hours, before being dismissed by Jay Z. Cole later used the CD as the backdrop for his debut mixtape, The Come Up. Early in his career, rappers 50 Cent, Tony Yayo and Young Buck have confirmed that Cole had been in talks to sign with G-Unit, but was passed on.

=== 2009–2010: Mixtapes and Roc Nation signing ===
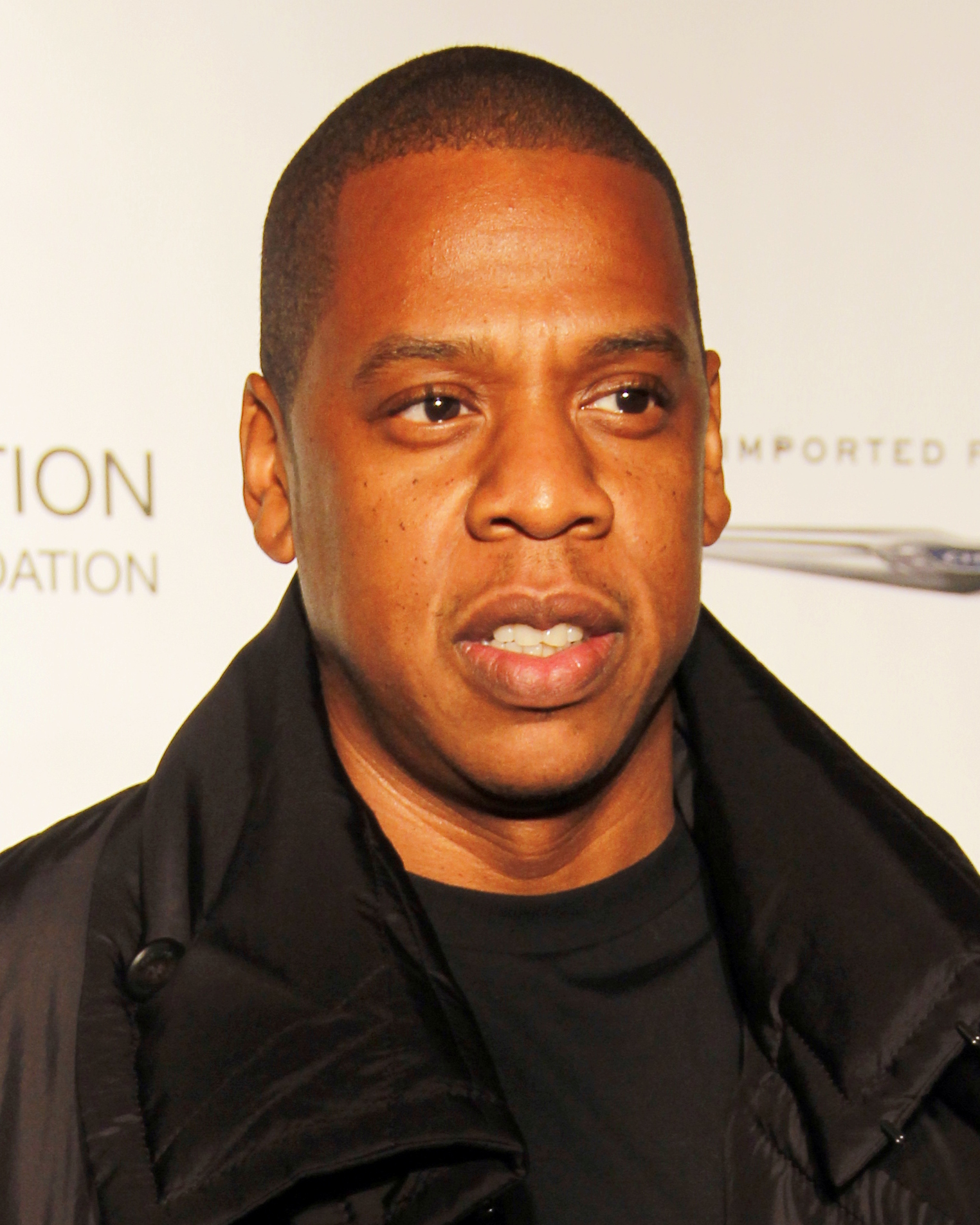
Cole was the first artist signed to Jay-Z's Roc Nation in 2009.

J. Cole released his second mixtape, The Warm Up, on June 15, 2009, to positive reviews. Cole appeared on Jay Z's album The Blueprint 3 (2009), on the track "A Star Is Born". He is featured on both Wale's debut album, Attention Deficit (2009) and mixtape Back to the Feature (2009), respectively. In January 2010, Cole, along with label mate Jay Electronica and Mos Def appeared on Talib Kweli and Hi-Tek's single, "Just Begun" for the follow-up of Reflection Eternal's album Train of Thought (2000), titled Revolutions Per Minute (2010). Cole also appeared on B.o.B's mixtape May 25 (2010), on the song "Gladiators", produced by The Alchemist.

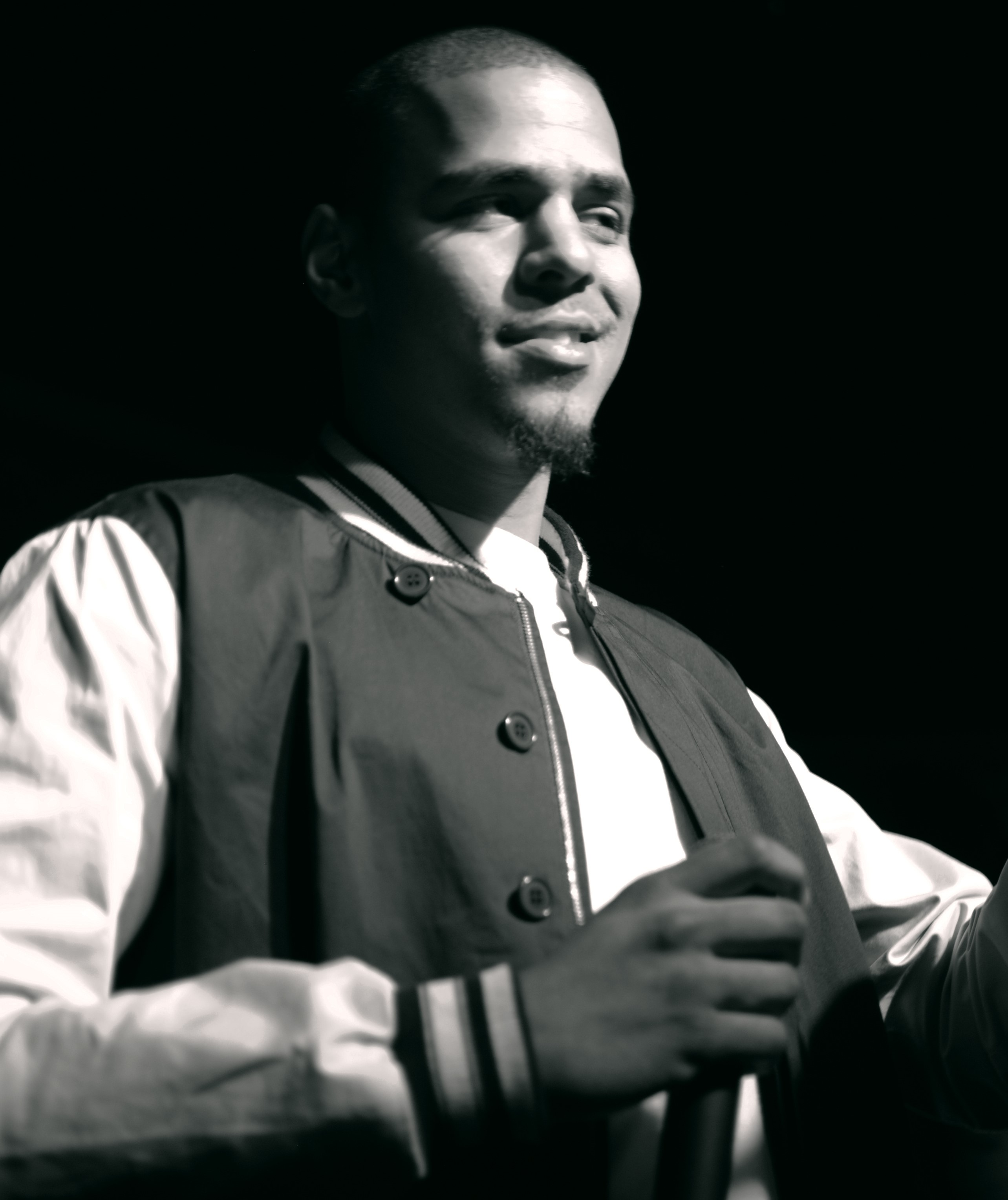
Cole performing at South by Southwest in 2010

In early 2010, Cole was chosen as one of Beyond Race magazine's "50 Great Breakthrough Artists". He ranked 49, resulting in the cover story of the publication's #11 issue, as well as a Q&A for the magazine's site. He was also featured in XXL Magazine's 2010 version of the Top Ten Freshmen, a yearly publication focusing on new rappers. Cole began a college tour from March 19 to April 30, concluding in New Brunswick, NJ at Rutgers University's annual Rutgersfest. The tour also featured a stop at Syracuse University for a show with fellow rapper, Wiz Khalifa. On March 31, he performed a new song titled "Who Dat", and released the song as a single on April 30. Cole was also featured on Young Chris' song "Still The Hottest" as well as Miguel's debut single "All I Want Is You". Additionally, Cole was featured on a track titled "We On", a song that failed to make the final track list for DJ Khaled's Victory LP.

To celebrate the anniversary of the release of The Warm Up mixtape, J. Cole released a freestyle entitled "The Last Stretch" on June 15. Six days later, J. Cole premiered the music video to his first single "Who Dat" on the BET program 106 & Park. In August, Cole was awarded the UMA Male Artist of the Year thanks to his heralded The Warm Up mixtape and a high-profile deal with Jay Z's label Roc Nation at the 2010 Underground Music Awards. In a July interview, J. Cole revealed three songs that would appear on his debut album: "Dreams", "Won't Be Long", and "Never Told", which was produced by No I.D. On October 30, a demo titled "I'm Coming Home" was leaked onto the Internet. Cole recorded the song as a reference track for Diddy, which later became "Coming Home" off Last Train to Paris (2010). On November 12 J. Cole released his third official mixtape titled Friday Night Lights. The tape included features from Drake, Wale, and Omen with most of the production being handled by Cole himself.

=== 2011–2012: Cole World: The Sideline Story ===
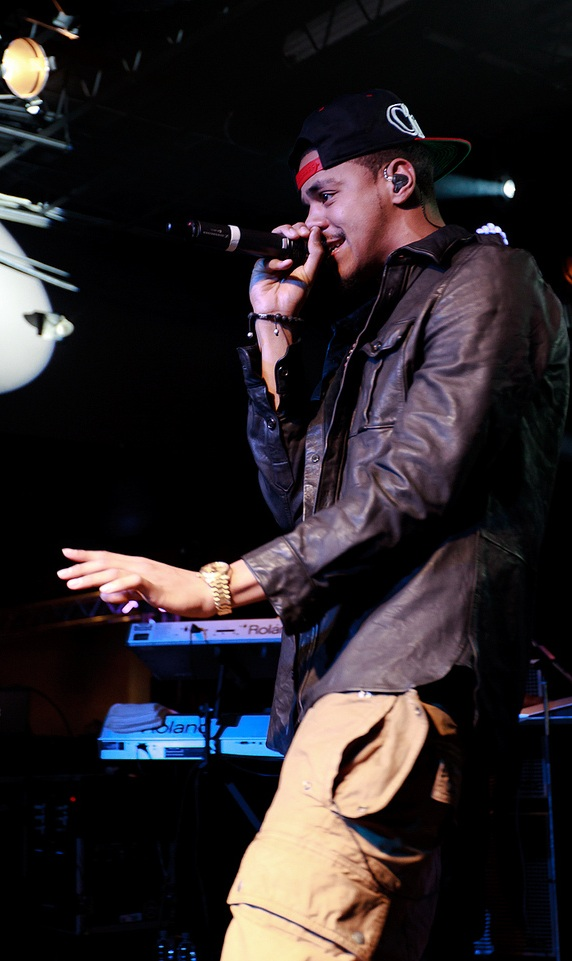
Cole performing in Toronto during Cole World... World Tour in 2011

Cole served as a supporting act for Drake on the Light Dreams and Nightmares UK Tour, from January 5 to 21, 2011. In April, "HiiiPoWeR", a song Cole produced for Kendrick Lamar's Section.80 (2011), was released, being the first of many collaborations to come from the two. On May 22, Cole released a song entitled "Return of Simba", the third in the "Simba" series of songs, following "Simba" and "Grown Simba". Cole purposely avoided releasing his debut album's title for fear of inconsistency, only announcing that Jay-Z would be featured on his debut album. Cole then released his follow-up single to "Who Dat", the album's lead single, "Work Out" on June 15, in honor of the second anniversary of his highly acclaimed mixtape The Warm Up. The song, produced by Cole himself, samples "The New Workout Plan" by Kanye West and interpolates "Straight Up" by Paula Abdul. The song later became a hit single, topping several music charts.

On July 31, Cole took to Twitter to announce Any Given Sunday, reminiscent of Kanye West's GOOD Fridays, a weekly free music giveaway. Cole wrote: "Every Sunday til the album drops I'll be back with something. Maybe just 1 song, maybe a video, depending on how I'm feeling." For the 3rd installment of the series, Cole took to Ustream to update fans about the album and play a select few tracks that didn't make the final track list. On August 15, the music video for "Work Out" premiered on YouTube, Vevo, and 106 & Park. On August 22, Cole released his debut album's cover art, designed by Alex Haldi for Bestest Asbestos, whom Cole recorded a song for, titled "Killers", for Haldi's mixtape The Glorification of Gangster. For the fourth installment on August 29, he released his debut album's track list, once again through Twitter.

On August 30, after an unfinished version had previously leaked, "Can't Get Enough" featuring R&B singer Trey Songz was released as the album's second single. While in Barbados for his last performance as the official opening act for Rihanna's Loud Tour, Cole shot the music video for "Can't Get Enough" with Songz and Rihanna, who provided a cameo appearance. The video, directed by Clifton Bell, was released on September 14. In addition, early on September 25, two days before his album's release, Cole released the music video for the iTunes bonus track "Daddy's Little Girl".

Cole World: The Sideline Story was released on September 27, debuting at number one on the US Billboard 200 chart, with 218,000 copies in its first week of sales. As of December 2, 2011, the album was certified gold by the Recording Industry Association of America (RIAA) for shipments and sales of 500,000 copies. On February 7, 2012, the third and final single from Cole's debut album was released. The song, titled "Nobody's Perfect", features renowned female rapper Missy Elliott, marking her return to music. As of December 2016, the album had sold 855,000 copies in the United States.

On October 24, 2011, during an interview with Hot 106's Rise & Grind morning show, Cole revealed he had begun working on his second studio album, with hopes of releasing it in June 2012. He also stated that the album would consist of songs that failed to make his debut, saying "I don't know how many, but I got songs that didn't make the last album that are automatically going to make this one," he said, revealing the release date: "June. End of June, maybe June." From November 6 to 8, Cole served as the supporting act for Tinie Tempah, appearing at Bournemouth International Centre; Liverpool Echo Arena, Motorpoint Arena Cardiff, Cardiff, Wales; LG Arena, Birmingham, England; SECC Arena, Glasgow, Scotland; and MEN Arena, Manchester.

=== 2012–2013: Born Sinner and Truly Yours series ===
Cole was nominated for Best New Artist at the 2012 Grammy Awards. Cole played for the Eastern Team in the 2012 NBA All-Star Weekend Celebrity Game. On February 24, 2012, Cole reached two million followers on Twitter, and celebrated by releasing the song "Grew Up Fast". On March 1, Cole returned to his home town, Fayetteville, North Carolina. To celebrate his return, he released the song "Visionz of Home", and launched an event titled "Dreamville Weekend" to inspire the youth of his hometown to achieve great things. Cole performed for the first time in Africa during the Big Brother Africa 7 opening ceremony on May 6, alongside Camp Mulla, P-Square, Naeto C, Flavour N'abania, Davido, and Aemo E'Face.

On May 14, Cole announced that he was working on a collaborative album with Kendrick Lamar, saying in an interview with Bootleg Kev that "I just started working with Kendrick the other day. We got it in, finally, again. We got maybe four or five [songs] together", also saying that the project would be more focused on and eventually released once Born Sinner had been released. On July 26, he returned to Twitter after a 100-day absence and went on to reveal and release his new song, "The Cure", in which he hinted at a new album. On October 20, he announced at a live show that his second album was complete and that he was waiting until after Lamar released Good Kid, M.A.A.D City to reveal it.

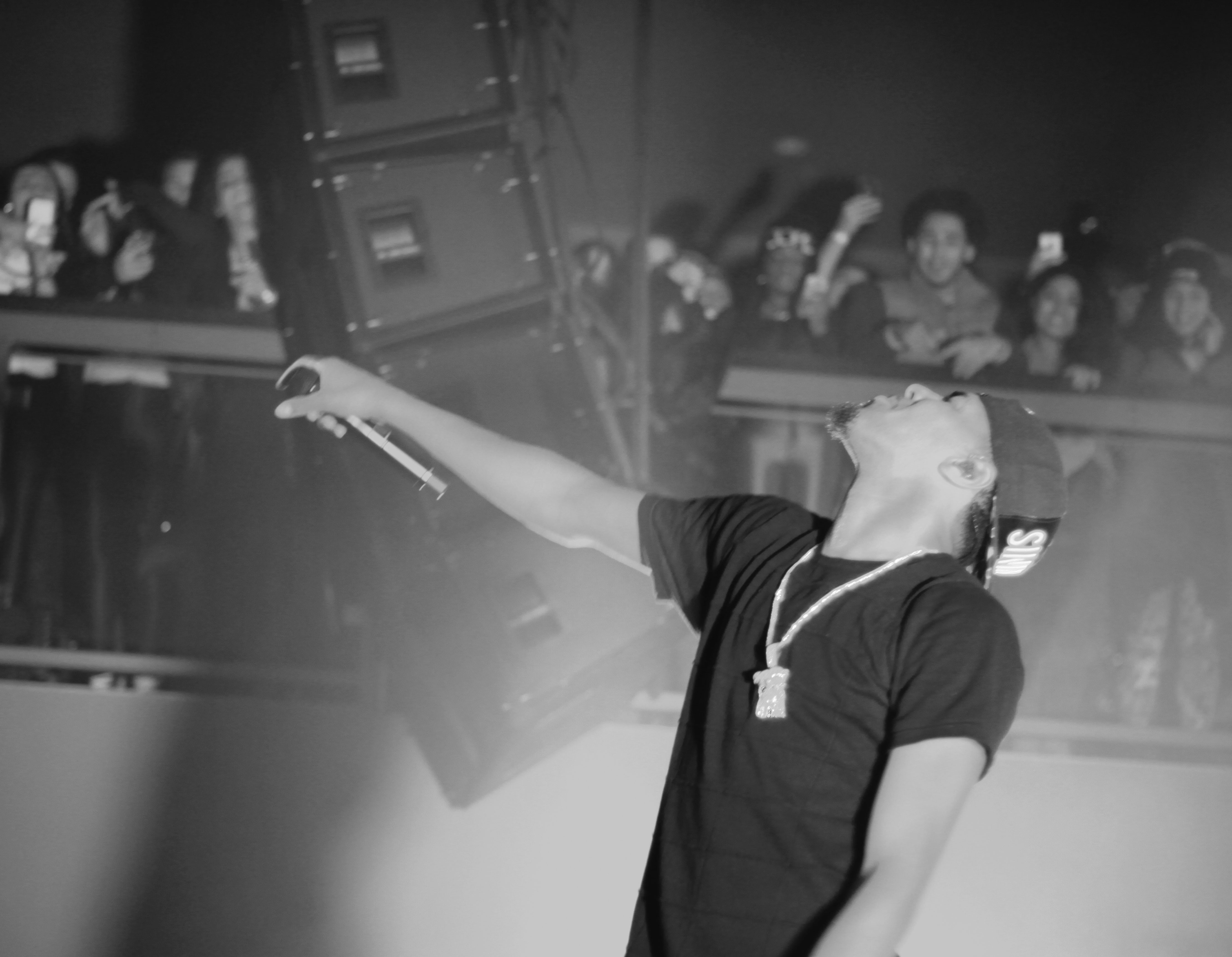
Cole performing during the What Dreams May Come Tour

On November 5, Cole revealed the title of his second album, Born Sinner, as well as a scheduled release date of January 28, 2013, via Ustream. On November 13, Cole released a promotional single for the album, titled "Miss America". Cole stated that he hoped "Miss America" would shift music in a different direction, adding that he knew it wouldn't be a big radio hit. He elaborated further, saying: "To me, 'Miss America' shifts things a little bit, it changes the conversation, it takes it in a more aggressive direction, more raw, more social commentary... Any type of commentary is good compared to what a normal single is these days. That's my aim, is to shift culture slightly, change the conversation. Nobody expects that for your first single."

On December 31, Cole revealed that Born Sinner would not be released on January 28, 2013, as previously expected. Cole said that he "needed a little more time than that to get things done". In promotion of Born Sinner, Cole released an EP titled Truly Yours on February 12. The project consisted of five tracks Cole knew would not appear on Born Sinner. On February 14, he released the artwork for the first single via Instagram. "Power Trip" was released the same day, marking Cole's second collaboration with R&B recording artist Miguel.

Cole had announced a release date of June 25, for Born Sinner. However, when it was announced that Kanye West's Yeezus would be released just one week earlier on June 18, Cole moved the release date of Born Sinner up a week in order to compete with West. He later commented, "This is art, and I can't compete against the Kanye West celebrity and the status that he's earned just from being a genius... But I can put my name in the hat and tell you that I think my album is great and you be the judge and you decide." Cole released the second installment in the Truly Yours series on April 30, the EP featured guest appearances from Bas, Young Jeezy, and 2 Chainz. Born Sinner sold 297,000 copies in the United States in its first week of release, debuting at number two on the Billboard 200 chart, finishing approximately 30,000 copies short of Kanye West's Yeezus. He released three more singles in support of the album, "Crooked Smile" featuring TLC, "Forbidden Fruit" featuring Kendrick Lamar, and "She Knows". As of December 2016, the album had sold 796,000 copies in the US.

=== 2014–2016: 2014 Forest Hills Drive ===
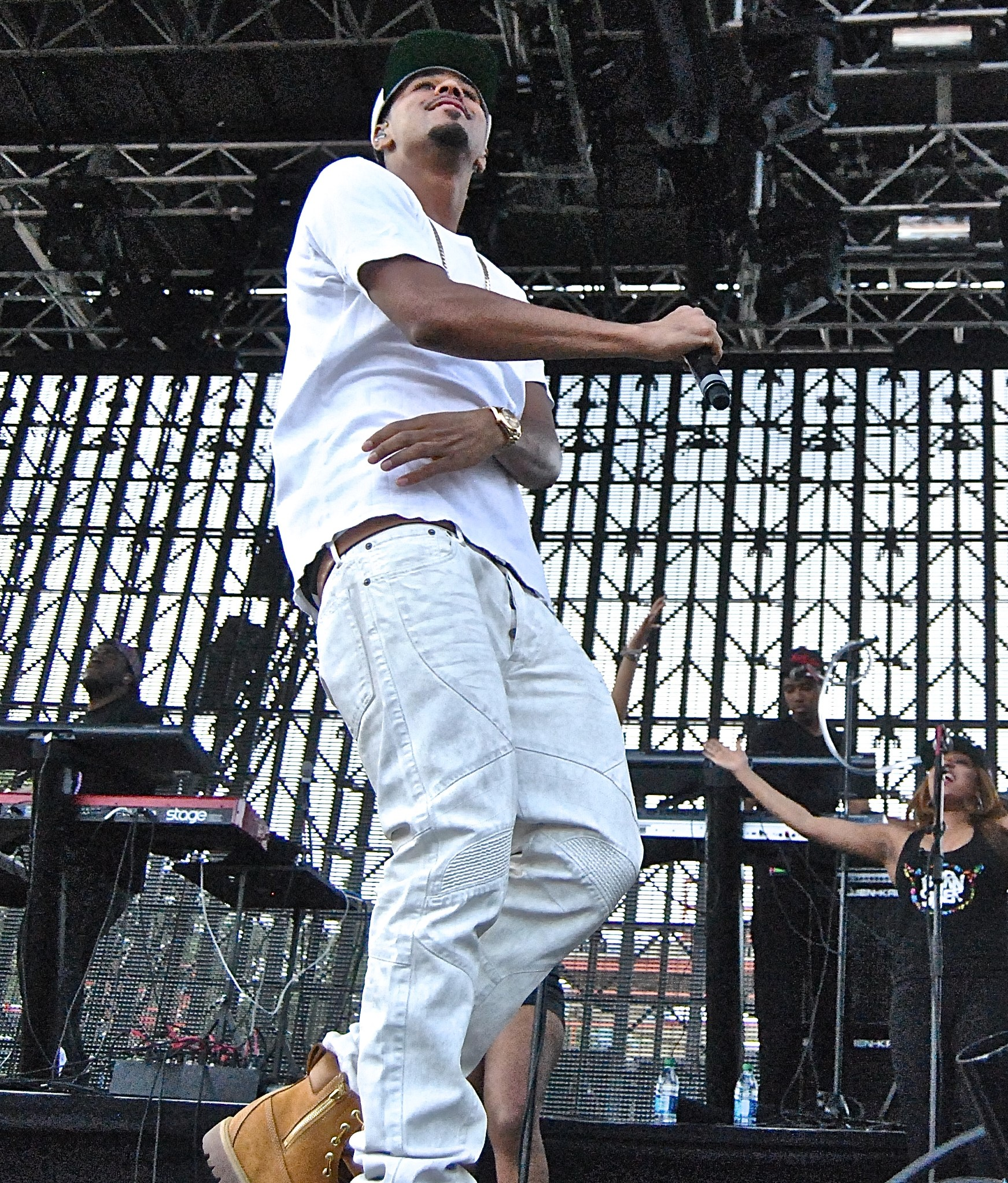
Cole performing at Governor's Ball 2014, in New York City

On August 15, 2014, Cole released "Be Free" in response to the shooting of Michael Brown in Ferguson, Missouri. Three days later, he visited the city in order to meet with protesters and activists who were gathered at the site of his shooting, discussing the civil unrest that was taking place within the city. He performed the track with an additional verse at the Late Show with David Letterman on December 10. On November 16, Cole released a video announcing that his third studio album, 2014 Forest Hills Drive, would be released on December 9. The video featured footage regarding the album's composition, as well as revealed that the album's name was derived from the address of Cole's childhood home. He announced that the album would include no lead singles and have little promotion, but was supported by four promotional singles; "Apparently", "Wet Dreamz", "No Role Modelz", and "Love Yourz". The album debuted at number one on the Billboard 200 upon release, selling 353,000 copies in its first week.

Cole announced the Forest Hills Drive Tour on February 13, 2015. The tour served as the backdrop for his first live album, Forest Hills Drive: Live. The album was recorded during the Fayetteville shows of the tour, and was released on Cole's 31st birthday. On March 31, Forest Hills Drive was certified platinum. As of December 2016, the album had sold 1.24 million copies in the US. 2014 Forest Hills Drive won Top Rap Album at the 2015 Billboard Music Awards and Album of the Year at the 2015 BET Hip Hop Awards. The album was nominated at the 58th Annual Grammy Awards for Best Rap Album. The single "Apparently'" was also nominated for Best Rap Performance.

On December 15, Cole announced a documentary series titled J. Cole: Road to Homecoming, ahead of his HBO special Forest Hills Drive: Homecoming. The series included five episodes as well as featuring guest appearances from Kendrick Lamar, Wale, Rihanna, Pusha T, Big Sean, Jay Z, and Drake. All episodes were released weekly and were available for free on Vimeo until January 9, 2016. The concert film Forest Hills Drive: Homecoming aired on January 9, which was filmed during the final show of his Forest Hills Drive Tour at the Crown Coliseum in Fayetteville, North Carolina. On January 28, Cole released Forest Hills Drive: Live as well as the music video for "Love Yourz", from the concert film.

=== 2016–2017: 4 Your Eyez Only ===
On July 29, 2016, DJ Khaled released his ninth studio album, Major Key. Cole is featured on the track "Jermaine's Interlude". "Said all I could say, now I play with thoughts of retirement" is a direct quote from the track that caused some of Cole's fans to worry about him and his music career. In an interview with Genius, Doctur Dot of the Atlanta duo EarthGang explained that the song was originally a nine-minute posse cut, he said, "We were just trying to get Bas to fuck with the song, but Cole was like, 'I can't resist this beat,' so he hit the weed for the first time in a long time." He overthinks on weed but we were in the garage smoking a blunt, the beat was running in the background. We stacked the hook up, we all had verses on it, it was a posse record and was like, nine verses long." On November 4, Cole performed at Jay Z and Beyoncé's Hillary Clinton Rally in Cleveland, Ohio, along with Big Sean and Chance the Rapper. On November 8 Spillage Village released the official version of "Jermaine's Interlude", called "Can't Call It". The song features Cole, EarthGang, Bas, and JID.

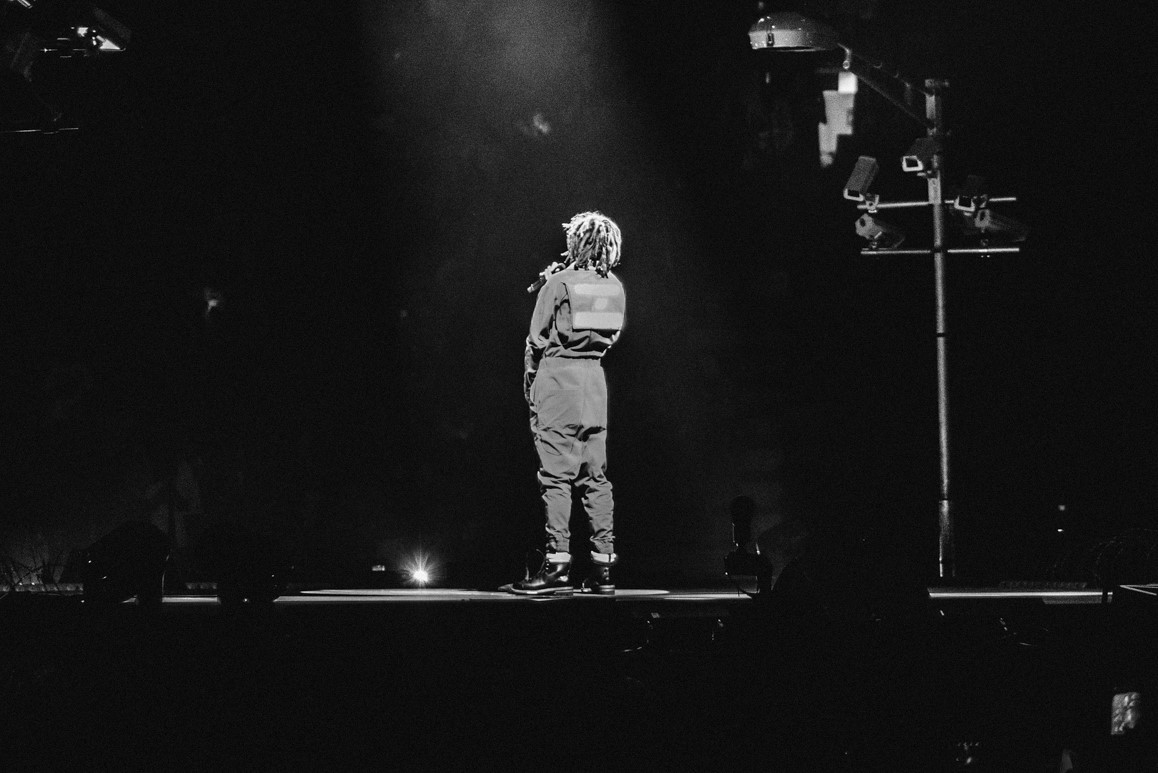
Cole performing in Toronto during 4 Your Eyez Only Tour in 2017

On December 1, the artwork and a track list for Cole's fourth album, titled 4 Your Eyez Only, were shown on iTunes available for pre-order, with a release date for December 9. On December 2, Cole released a 40-minute documentary titled Eyez, on Tidal. It features behind-the-scenes footage of Cole and collaborators working on the album, including two music videos for the tracks "Everybody Dies" and "False Prophets"; neither song was included on the album. On December 5, "False Prophets" and "Everybody Dies" were released as singles to iTunes store and other streaming services. 4 Your Eyez Only debuted at number one on the Billboard 200 with 492,000 album-equivalent units, of which 363,000 were pure album sales, becoming Cole's fourth number one album. The track "Deja Vu" entered the US Billboard Hot 100 at number 7 without being released as a single, becoming J. Cole's highest-charting song. All 10 songs from 4 Your Eyez Only debuted in the top 40 of the Hot 100, after only having four top 40 hits as a solo artist. "False Prophets" and "Everybody Dies" both charted also. Cole achieved twelve simultaneous Hot 100 entries in a single week. "Deja Vu" was released as the album's first single on January 10, 2017. On January 12, 4 Your Eyez Only was certified gold by the Recording Industry Association of America (RIAA). On April 7, the album was certified platinum by the Recording Industry Association of America (RIAA).

On January 16, Cole surprisingly released a track titled "High for Hours" via his SoundCloud. The song was produced by Elite and Cam O'Bi. The song was released on the iTunes store as a single on January 18. Cole announced the 4 Your Eyez Only World Tour on February 21, with the tour including 62 dates across North America, Europe, and Australia. On March 24, HBO announced a documentary titled, J. Cole: 4 Your Eyez Only, the film aired April 15. The film was directed by Cole and Scott Lazer, and is available on YouTube.

=== 2018-2019: KOD and Revenge of the Dreamers III ===
On April 16, 2018, J. Cole announced a surprise free event for fans at the Gramercy Theatre in New York City. The event turned out to be a listening session for his forthcoming album, titled KOD, which was released on April 20. Cole held a second listening session in London the next day. The album's cover and tracklist show twelve tracks and two features, both by Cole's alter ego, Kill Edward. Cole had mentioned that KOD has 3 meanings, Kids on Drugs, King Overdosed, and Kill Our Demons. The cover art for KOD was done by a Detroit artist named Kamau Haroon who goes by the name Sixmau. The album touches on many topics including drug abuse, addiction, depression, and greed.

In the US, on the day of its release, KOD broke the previous record for Views by Drake in 2016 by receiving 64.5 million streams on Apple Music. It accumulated 36.7 million streams on Spotify in its first 24 hours as well. Additionally, the titled track also surpassed Taylor Swift's "Look What You Made Me Do" by 0.4 million streams on its first day. The album debuted at number one on the US Billboard 200, earning 397,000 album-equivalent units, including 174,000 in pure sales, making it Cole's fifth number one album. J. Cole also became the first act to simultaneously debut three songs in the top 10 of the Billboard Hot 100, with "ATM" (at 6), "Kevin's Heart" (8), and "KOD" (10). The remainder of the album also debuted in the Hot 100, totaling to twelve songs on the chart. "KOD" was released as the album's first single, on May 8, 2018. Cole released music videos for the songs "ATM" and "Kevin's Heart", both of which were directed by Cole and Scott Lazer. "ATM" impacted US rhythmic contemporary radio on July 31, as the album's second single. Songs from the album were featured in the official 2018 NBA Playoffs and the NBA Finals promotion for ESPN. On April 27, it was announced that Cole was working on another project titled The Fall Off, Cole said that he planned to release The Fall Off before he recorded KOD. Cole also confirmed that he is working on a Kill Edward album. On May 14, KOD was certified Gold by the Recording Industry Association of America (RIAA) for sales of over 500,000 album-equivalent units in the US. The album has since been certified Platinum by the Recording Industry Association of America (RIAA) with one million album-equivalent units in the US.

Cole announced the KOD Tour on May 8, Young Thug, Jaden Smith, EarthGang, and Kill Edward served as the supporting acts. The tour will include 34 North American dates, starting in Miami, on August 9 and concluding in Boston, on October 10. Cole performed "Intro" and "Friends" at the 2018 BET Awards on June 24. Singer Daniel Caesar performed part of "Intro" and the chorus to "Friends", rapper Wale was also part of the set.

On August 7, Cole released a single titled, "Album of the Year (Freestyle)". The single was accompanied by a music video, which premiered on WorldStarHipHop. Cole also announced a new project titled, The Off Season, which he plans to release ahead of his next studio album, The Fall Off. In the description to the video, it reads: "The Off Season coming soon... All roads lead to The Fall Off - Cole". In an interview for Billboard in September, Cole said he plans to take off 2019 from touring to finish work on The Off Season, The Fall Off, and the Kill Edward project.

On January 6, 2019, Cole took to Twitter to announce Dreamville's compilation album Revenge of the Dreamers III by uploading a gold poster-like invitation. Recording sessions took place in Atlanta beginning January 6 through January 16. Throughout the 10-days of recording, invitations were shared by the entire Dreamville roster, among other artists and producers outside of Dreamville. A total of 343 artists and producers were invited to the sessions including, Big K.R.I.T., Mike Will Made It, DJ Khaled, Swizz Beatz, Tay Keith, T.I, Rick Ross, 9th Wonder and Wale, among others. On January 23, Cole released his first lead single since 2013 titled, "Middle Child". With only one day of tracking, "Middle Child" debuted at number 26 on the US Billboard Hot 100. The following week, the song peaked at number 4, making it Cole's highest-charting song. Cole performed at the 2019 NBA All-Star Game for its halftime show on February 17, in Charlotte. He performed "Middle Child", "A Lot", "ATM", "Love Yourz" and "No Role Modelz". On May 23, Cole was featured alongside American rapper and singer Travis Scott on American rapper Young Thug's single "The London", which would become the lead single from Thug's debut studio album, So Much Fun. "The London" would later reach number twelve on the Billboard Hot 100 chart.

On June 12, the first of two sets of dual singles from Revenge of the Dreamers III were released: "Down Bad" featuring Cole, JID, Bas, EarthGang, and Young Nudy and "Got Me" featuring Ari Lennox, Omen, Ty Dolla Sign, and Dreezy. On July 1, the second set of dual singles from the album were released: "LamboTruck" featuring Cozz, Reason, and Childish Major and "Costa Rica" featuring Bas, JID, Guapdad 4000, Reese Laflare, Jace, Mez, Smokepurpp, Buddy, and Ski Mask the Slump God. Dreamville announced the album's release date on the same day and was selling limited merchandise on July 1, related to the album. On July 2, Dreamville Presents: REVENGE was released on the label's official YouTube account, a film documenting the album's recording sessions in Atlanta.

Revenge of the Dreamers III debuted at number one on the US Billboard 200 with 115,000 album-equivalent units, of which 24,000 were pure album sales, earning Cole his sixth consecutive number-one album in the country. The album was certified Platinum by the Recording Industry Association of America (RIAA). The album was nominated for Best Rap Album at the 62nd Annual Grammy Awards, while "Middle Child" and "Down Bad" were nominated for Best Rap Performance. Cole's collaboration with 21 Savage "A Lot" received a Grammy Award for Best Rap Song, making this his first Grammy Award win.

=== 2020–2025: The Off-Season and Might Delete Later ===
On June 16, 2020, J. Cole released his first song of the year, "Snow on tha Bluff", a politically charged track released soon after the murder of George Floyd that led to disagreements with and criticism from Noname and other rappers. On July 23, Cole released a promotional EP titled Lewis Street featuring two new songs, "The Climb Back" and "Lion King on Ice". The former later appeared on The Off-Season. On December 29, Cole took to Instagram to post a photo where he documented a list titled, "The Fall Off Era". On the list crossed out, was features and Revenge of the Dreamers III. Also listed, but not crossed out was two projects, The Off-Season and It's a Boy, which he announced would be released ahead of The Fall-Off. The caption of the post read: "I still got some goals I gotta check off for' I scram..."

On May 4, 2021, J. Cole officially revealed the release date and album artwork of The Off-Season, his sixth studio album. The album's lead single, "Interlude", was released on May 7. The Off-Season was released on May 14. The album was co-executively produced by T-Minus and featured guest appearances from Morray, 21 Savage, Lil Baby, Bas, and 6LACK. It received positive reviews from critics and topped the US Billboard 200, selling 282,000 album-equivalent units in its first week, earning Cole his sixth consecutive number-one album in the country. Four songs from The Off-Season debuted in the top ten on the US Billboard Hot 100, with "My Life" (at 2), "Amari" (at 5), "Pride Is the Devil" (at 7), and "95 South" (at 8). "Interlude" debuted at number eight the previous week giving the album five top ten singles.

On September 21, J. Cole released a freestyle titled "Heaven's EP", remixing the beat of "Pipe Down" from Drake's Certified Lover Boy. On March 31, 2022, the song later appeared on the Dreamville compilation D-Day: A Gangsta Grillz Mixtape, with Cole also appearing on the songs "Stick" and "Freedom of Speech". On October 6, 2023, Drake's album For All The Dogs was released; on it, J. Cole was featured on the eventual single "First Person Shooter", which would debut at number one on the Billboard Hot 100, becoming his first song to top the chart.

On April 5, 2024, Cole released the mixtape Might Delete Later after teasing the project through a series of vlogs posted on a YouTube channel with the same name. On the song "7 Minute Drill", J. Cole retaliated against Kendrick Lamar in response to his song "Like That" with Future & Metro Boomin in which Lamar raps "motherfuck the big three, nigga, it's just big me", which in itself was a response to "First Person Shooter" in which Cole raps "Love when they argue the hardest MC / Is it K-Dot (Lamar) is it Aubrey (Drake) or me / We the big three like we started a league", amidst the Drake-Kendrick Lamar feud. Two days after the album's release, Cole apologized for the diss track at Dreamville Festival, and the track was subsequently removed from streaming platforms.

On November 17, Cole announced the limited podcast series Inevitable, hosted by Cole himself, alongside his longtime manager Ibrahim Hamad and frequent collaborator Scott Lazer. The first season of the podcast consisted of 10 episodes, with the debut episode premiering the following day, and subsequent episodes released every two days on the Inevitable website. The podcast's release was accompanied by the release of Cole's mixtapes, The Come Up, The Warm Up, and Friday Night Lights on streaming platforms, along with some unreleased material being played in episodes of the podcast.

=== 2026–present: The Fall-Off ===
On January 14, 2026, Cole surprise-released an announcement for the release date and unveiled the cover art of his long-awaited seventh and final studio album, The Fall-Off, scheduling it for release on February 6. He also released a song named "Disc 2 Track 2" via his socials, accompanied by a music video, hinting that the album is a double album. On January 27, Cole released an EP, Birthday Blizzard '26, on his website, to celebrate his birthday. The EP, hosted by DJ Clue, contained Cole freestyling on instrumentals like "Victory", "Who Shot Ya?" among others. On February 6, Cole officially released The Fall-Off, featuring guest appearances from Burna Boy, Erykah Badu, Future, Morray, Petey Pablo, PJ, and Tems. During an AMA on his website, Cole revealed that he doesn't have any plans to make an album anytime soon, and would like to return to producing music. He also confirmed the release of the mixtape It's a Boy, which was originally supposed to be released before The Fall-Off.

== Basketball career ==
Cole played basketball at Terry Sanford High School in North Carolina. With an academic scholarship, he tried out as a walk-on at St. John's University and was one of 10 call-back players during his sophomore year. In 2012, Cole played for the Eastern Team during the NBA All-Star Weekend Celebrity Game. In 2013, Cole told Sports Illustrated, "Sports is where it started for me. It parallels my life. Rap is such a competitive thing. That's why I have to watch sports. I got to keep up. It's my life in just another form."

On July 20, 2020, Cole released an article for The Players' Tribune, writing about his goals after graduating college to eventually playing professional basketball, saying "if I can blow up in the next three years, that means I'll only be 27. That still might give me enough time to train and pursue a professional basketball career. I'll work hard enough to go play overseas and then try to work my way to the NBA." On July 31, 2020, Cole released his debut signature shoe in collaboration with Puma called the PUMA RS-Dreamer. In August 2020, it was also reported by Master P that Cole was training to try out for the NBA.

In September 2022, J. Cole was named as the cover athlete for NBA 2K23 on the Dreamer Edition, and was featured in the game, as well as a character in the game's "MyCareer" mode. Cole said in a press release, "NBA 2K has long been a place to discover new musical talent through their game and continues to be a gold standard for showcasing all things basketball culture. It's been an amazing journey to not only appear on a cover of this year's game, but to be part of the MyCareer storyline, soundtrack and bring the Dreamer brand into NBA 2K."

=== Patriots Basketball Club (2021) ===
On May 10, 2021, Cole signed a contract with the Rwanda-based Patriots Basketball Club in the Basketball Africa League. Cole was also featured on the cover of the American basketball magazine SLAM, for their May 2021 issue. Cole made his professional debut on May 16 against the Rivers Hoopers, finishing with three points, three rebounds and two assists in 17 minutes. In three games with the team, he scored five points, had three assists and five rebounds in 45 minutes of gameplay. He was only under contract for a minimum of three games. He left the team after playing the three games.

=== Scarborough Shooting Stars (2022) ===
On May 19, 2022, Cole signed with the Scarborough Shooting Stars of the Canadian Elite Basketball League. On June 8, 2022, in a social media interview released by the Shooting Stars, it was announced that Cole would take an indefinite leave from the team to fulfill his concert tour commitments. In 4 games with the Shooting Stars, Cole averaged 2.4 points, 0.6 rebounds, and 0.4 assists, while shooting 50% from 3-point range.

=== Nanjing Monkey Kings (2026) ===
On April 1, 2026, Cole signed with the Nanjing Monkey Kings of the Chinese Basketball Association (CBA). While scheduled to play three games for the Monkey Kings, due to work visa delays, he was only able to play one game. In his CBA debut on April 11, Cole finished with one rebound and one assist in an 81–95 loss against the Guangzhou Loong Lions.

=== Career statistics ===
==== BAL ====
Year	Team	GP	GS	MPG	FG%	3P%	FT%	RPG	APG	SPG	BPG	PPG
2021	Patriots BBC	3	0	15.2	.286	.000	1.000	1.7	1.0	.3	.3	1.7

== Artistic influences ==
Cole has cited several hip-hop artists as influencing his rapping style, including Tupac, Jay-Z, Eminem, Nas, and Andre 3000. He described in an interview with Steve Lobel, "Jay [Z] was a mentor before I ever signed to him." "I studied his moves that much. ... I got to go on tour with him and steal a lot of gems. That's how you supposed to do it. You're supposed to learn and take pieces from the greatest. So, Jay was my mentor before I ever signed to him. And now that I signed to him it's just a blessing to be able to hit him for advice and get that real 20 years of experience or however long he been in the game. It's priceless." "My favorite rapper was Pac," he said. "He was my favorite rapper before I even started rapping. Before I even thought of—It went from Michael Jackson, Bobby Brown as a kid and artists like that. Even Kool Moe Dee. Just the cool dude that I looked up to. And then one day my stepfather came home from—I don't know if he was back from Desert Storm. ... I remember him coming home with that first Pac album. With 'Brenda's Got a Baby'. It was 2Pacalypse Now. And since then—When I was too young to know what he was talking about, but it connected. Cause that's the thing about art. It's just truth. It's straight–Whatever you feel. So, even as a seven-year-old kid, eight-year-old kid I could hear Pac's early albums and feel the truth." Cole drew comparisons to Nas following the release of Friday Night Lights, stating that Nas served as the primary inspiration behind the creation of the mixtape. Cole later addressed their musical similarities on "Let Nas Down", a song written and composed due to his disparaging comments towards "Work Out". As a response to this record, Nas came out with the song "Made Nas Proud" shortly after.

In 2014, in an interview with Angie Martinez, Cole listed Tupac, The Notorious B.I.G., Nas, and Jay-Z as his top four rappers of all time, with André 3000 and Eminem being a toss-up for fifth.

== Controversies ==
=== Puff Daddy ===
In August 2013, Cole and Puff Daddy were reportedly involved in an altercation at a 2013 MTV Video Music Awards after party in New York City. Reports said the incident started when Puff tried to confront rapper Kendrick Lamar over the "King of New York" claim in his "Control" verse. Puff allegedly attempted to pour a drink on Lamar, and Cole intervened. The two started arguing and Cole and Puff allegedly got into an altercation, which then led to problems between their respective crews. After a brief scuffle, both crews separated. Ibrahim Hamad, a close friend of Cole's and president of Dreamville Records took to Twitter to address the rumors saying: "The Internet is a crazy place you niggaz reporting shit with no facts, Cole ain't get thrown out no party and he damn sure aint get beat up", he continued saying, "Ain't gon go into details about last night but get the facts right first before you rush to report some shit for some extra blog clicks". A few months after the incident, Cole and Puff were seen in a video promoting Revolt, joking about the incident.

In 2021, Cole seemed to recall the incident on the song "Let Go My Hand", from his 2021 album, The Off-Season, rapping: "My last scrap was with Puff Daddy, who would've thought it?/I bought that nigga album in seventh grade and played it so much/You would've thought my favorite rapper was Puff/Back then I ain't know shit, now I know too much."

=== Reactions to "False Prophets" ===
Upon the release of Eyez documentary in 2016, the songs "Everybody Dies" and "False Prophets" caused controversy within the hip-hop community, as many assumed that "Everybody Dies" contained shots aimed at fellow rappers Lil Uzi Vert and Lil Yachty. During an interview with Los Angeles' radio station Power 106, Lil Yachty responded, saying: "I don't listen to J. Cole [but] I definitely listened to it [and] people said he was talking about me. He said 'Lil.' I'm not little. My name has 'Lil' in it but there's a lot of 'Lil' rappers. [It's] either me or Uzi. Honestly, I don't give a fuck." Lil Uzi Vert acknowledged the track, responding via Twitter on December 2, 2016, by simply tweeting, "Heard some beautiful shit today @JColeNC". People also argued that the first verse on "False Prophets" consisted of direct shots at rapper Kanye West, due to Cole's referencing to West's altering public perception by the media and fans; as well as Kanye's recent hospitalization. Many also presumed that the second verse was directed at rapper Wale, with Cole saying that despite Wale's fourth album receiving fairly positive critical and commercial success, Wale remains misunderstood and slighted by some of his peers. On December 3, Wale released a track, called "Groundhog Day" as a response to "False Prophets", and the pair were spotted together in Raleigh, North Carolina at a North Carolina State University basketball game later that day. West also seemingly responded to the song on an unheard demo version of rapper Pusha T's "What Would Meek Do?" from the latter's 2018 album Daytona, which was different from the released version. Cole spoke on "False Prophets" in an interview with The New York Times, he said:

Rappers rap about other rappers all the time—subliminal insult, direct attack—but rarely from a place of love. "That speaks to the state of us as a people," he said. "For so long my mind state was, I have to show how much better than the next man I am through these bars. Who's the best? Let me prove it. And it's just like, damn, I'm really feeding into a cycle of keeping black people down, I'm really feeding into that.

=== Lil Pump ===
In April 2018, rapper Lil Pump teased a song titled "Fuck J. Cole" produced by fellow rapper Smokepurpp. Media outlets and rappers speculated that the song "1985" from KOD was a response to the two, while Cole said in a Vulture interview that "It's really a 'shoe fits' situation—several people can wear that shoe." Lil Pump reacted to the song hours after the album's release via Instagram saying, "Wow, you get so much props. You dissed a 17 year old, lame ass jit." Later that day during a concert in Atlanta, Smokepurpp, along with his fans erupted in a chant of "fuck J. Cole". According to Cole, the target of the song is more general. He said it takes aim at what he sees as the cartoon version of hip-hop, he explained: "If you exclude the top three rappers in the game, the most popping rappers all are exaggerated versions of black stereotypes; extremely tatted up, colorful hair, flamboyant, brand names. It's caricatures, and still the dominant representation of black people on the most popular entertainment format for black people, period." On May 4, 2018, as Cole was performing at JMBLYA festival in Dallas, he performed "1985", cutting off the backing track so he could rap his verse a cappella. The crowd erupted in chants of "fuck Lil Pump" and "fuck 6ix9ine". Cole immediately shut down the chants telling the crowd, "Don't do that." Cole performed "1985" during his Rolling Loud Festival performance on May 11, 2018, in Miami. During the performance Lil Pump was seen dancing to the song near the stage. On May 25, after Rolling Loud, J. Cole and Lil Pump sat down for an hour-long interview indicating that a supposed beef between the two is over. Cole asked Pump about his "fuck J. Cole" comments in his music and social media. Pump responds by claiming he had seen his fans commenting it on social media and didn't know why. "But now I kinda get it", he says. "We make different types of music, so people, like... People just like doing that shit." He continues, "It wasn't even serious... I fuck with your shit. It's hard."

In January 2026, Lil Pump, amidst a livestream hosted by DJ Akademiks, reiterated his stance on Cole, after the latter apologized for his song "7 Minute Drill" in 2024, and said, "I'ma keep it real, that's some soft-ass shit". He then went on to reference their 2018 interview, which was held in Cole's house, further adding, "He's a fucking pussy, bro. Dork. The first thing I did when I walked in his fucking house was go to his refrigerator and start eating hella snacks... Ready for the interview. Got no type of respect for that man's house." Two months later, he criticized Cole on Instagram for allegedly leaving a nightclub's premises in Miami, due to the song "Gucci Gang" playing at the club. He ridiculed Cole's relationship with his father and also directed insults aimed at Cole's spouse, Melissa Heholt.

=== Noname ===
In May 2020, in the midst of the George Floyd protests, rapper Noname made a tweet panning rappers who discussed the struggles of black people in their music but had yet to publicly speak out on social media regarding the protests or Black Lives Matter. The tweet read:

"Poor black folks all over the country are putting their bodies on the line in protest for our collective safety and y'all favorite top selling rappers not even willing to put a tweet up. niggas whole discographies be about black plight and they no where to be found".

Many assumed her tweet was aimed at Cole and Kendrick Lamar, both of whom had yet to post on social media about the protests at the time of her tweet. On June 16, 2020, Cole released a song titled, "Snow on tha Bluff" addressing an unnamed woman, assumed to be Noname, while also touching on police brutality and race relations during the George Floyd protests. Shortly after the song's release, Noname tweeted "QUEEN TONE!!!!!!", referencing a lyric from the song. She later deleted the tweet. Many other artists defended Noname, including Ari Lennox, who is signed to Cole's Dreamville label. Lennox thanked Noname "for giving [a fuck] about us constantly and endlessly", saying she appreciates "everything you [Noname] put out to the world". Rapper Chance the Rapper, criticized Cole, calling the song "not constructive" and saying it "undermines all the work Noname has done". Cole eventually addressed backlash in a series of tweets, defending his statements in the song and encouraging listeners to follow Noname on social media. Two days after the release of "Snow on tha Bluff", Noname released "Song 33", in which she alluded to Cole writing about her in the wake of the protests, rapping: "I guess the ego hurt now / It's time to go to work, wow, look at him go / He really 'bout to write about me when the world is in smokes? When there's people in trees? When George was beggin' for his mother sayin' he couldn't breathe? He thought to write about me?". Cole acknowledged the track shortly after its release, sharing a link to the song on Twitter. Cole and Noname previously collaborated in 2015, on the song "Warm Enough" from Donnie Trumpet and The Social Experiment's Surf album.

=== Cam'ron ===
Cam'ron first collaborated with Cole on "95 South" (2021) and then again on "Ready '24" (2024). Cam'ron filed a lawsuit against Cole in October 2025. In his claim, he alleged that these collaborations came with the agreement that Cole would return the favor, either by featuring on a song or by appearing on Cam'ron's podcast. The filing, which claimed Cam'ron's "Ready '24" verse was recorded in June 2022, said that Cole was repeatedly asked over the next two years to fulfill his promise but did not, that "Ready '24" was released without authorization, and that Cam'ron had not received royalties for the song. Cole and his team filed a motion to dismiss in February 2026, denying all allegations. The two reconciled when Cole appeared on Cam'ron's Talk with Flee podcast in March 2026. Cam'ron explained that he did not expect the lawsuit to go to trial but felt it was necessary to get Cole's attention; Cole sympathized with Cam'ron's perspective. Both parties' attorneys wrote in a May 2026 court filing that the lawsuit had been settled out of court.

== Business ventures ==
=== Dreamville Records ===
During the composition of The Come Up, Cole started his own record label in early 2007 with current label president Ibrahim Hamad. Cole sought for an avenue to release his own music, while Hamad yearned to start a record label, prompting the two to team up to form Dreamville Records. The label is currently distributed by Interscope Records.

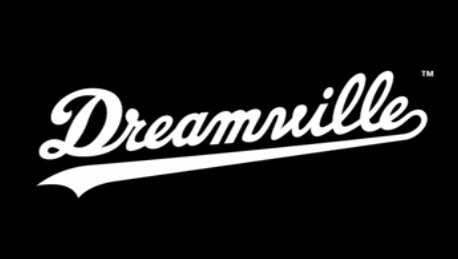
The logo of Cole's Dreamville Records imprint

Cole, Omen, and Bas were the label's inaugural artists. The label houses artists including Cole, Omen, Bas, Cozz, Lute, Ari Lennox, JID, and duo EarthGang. In-house producers include Elite, Ron Gilmore, Cedric Brown, and Meez.

=== The Dreamville Foundation ===
In October 2011, Cole established The Dreamville Foundation, a 501(c)(3) non-profit organization. The Foundation says that it was "created to 'bridge the gap' between the worlds of opportunity and the urban youth" of Cole's hometown of Fayetteville, North Carolina. With volunteers, the Foundation conducts philanthropic activities, such as an annual "Back To School Supply Giveaway" to provide supplies to schoolchildren. The Foundation also launched a book club for young men and sponsored "The Nobody's Perfect Writing Contest and Mother's Day Brunch" for students. It sponsors an annual weekend of Fayetteville community events called the "Dreamville Weekend" that features a discussion with the Young Men's Book Club and Appreciation Dinner and a Career Day panel of African-American professionals in a variety of fields.

In 2014, Cole purchased his childhood home in Fayetteville, North Carolina, for $120,000 through the Dreamville Foundation. The home had been repossessed from his mother years earlier, while Jermaine was attending college in New York. His plan is to turn the house into a homestead for single mothers and their children to live rent-free.

=== Tidal ===
In March 2015, Project Panther, the business of Cole's mentor Jay-Z, acquired Aspiro, the owner of the music streaming service Tidal, for a reported $56 million. J. Cole is a minor shareholder of the service, along with 15 other artist stakeholders, including Kanye West, Usher, Alicia Keys, Beyoncé, Rihanna, Madonna, Daft Punk, deadmau5, and Nicki Minaj.

=== Dreamville Festival ===
On April 27, 2018, J. Cole announced the Dreamville Festival, the festival featuring local music, culture, food and art, and also includes a mix of up-and-comers and national acts. It is expected to be an annual festival. However, in the wake of Hurricane Florence, the event was postponed from its original date. The festival was rescheduled and held at the historic Dorothea Dix Park in Raleigh, North Carolina on April 6, 2019. The lineup included all of Dreamville's artists as well as SZA, Big Sean, Nelly, 21 Savage, 6LACK, Davido, Teyana Taylor, Saba, Rapsody, and Mez. The Dreamville Festival plans to donate proceeds to the Dorothea Dix Park Conservancy and the Dreamville Foundation.

=== Fashion ===
In February 2020, J. Cole announced a multi-year footwear and apparel partnership with Puma as an ambassador for the brand. According to the global director of Puma, Cole is involved in product creation, marketing campaigns and cultural guidance. With the announcement, Puma and Cole released a short film for the reimagined "Sky Dreamer" shoes, which debuted during the 2020 NBA All-Star Game.

On July 31, 2020, PUMA and J. Cole released their debut collaboration shoe, the PUMA RS-Dreamer. Cole commented on the signature shoe saying: "Over the years, basketball shoes have progressed greatly in their level of technology and comfort but have strayed too far away from designs stylish enough for cultural relevancy. The Dreamer hopes to change that reality. The highest level of on-court performance meets the highest level of aesthetic design for daily wear. Once again, you can hoop in the same shoes you wore outside." The launch of the shoe coincided with the restart of the 2019–20 NBA season.

== Personal life ==
In a January 2016 interview with director Ryan Coogler, Cole revealed that he was married. His wife, Melissa Heholt, who met Cole while they were students at St. John's University, is the executive director of the Dreamville Foundation. Also in a May 2018 interview with radio host Angie Martinez, Cole stated that he and his wife have a son together. In 2019, he publicly spoke about his son. On July 20, 2020, Cole revealed he has two children.

== Discography ==
Studio albums

- Cole World: The Sideline Story (2011)
- Born Sinner (2013)
- 2014 Forest Hills Drive (2014)
- 4 Your Eyez Only (2016)
- KOD (2018)
- The Off-Season (2021)
- The Fall-Off (2026)

== Concert tours ==
Headlining

- Cole World... World Tour (2011)
- What Dreams May Come Tour (2013–14)
- Dollar & A Dream Tour (2013)
- Dollar & A Dream Tour 2014: The Warm Up (2014)
- Forest Hills Drive Tour (2015)
- Dollar & A Dream Tour III: Friday Night Lights (2015)
- 4 Your Eyez Only World Tour (2017)
- KOD Tour (2018)
- The Fall-Off World Tour (2026)

Co-headlining

- The Campus Consciousness Tour (with Big K.R.I.T.) (2012)
- Revenge of the Dreamers NYC Crawl (with Dreamville) (2015)
- The Off-Season Tour (with 21 Savage) (2021)
- It's All A Blur Tour - Big As the What? (with Drake) (2024)

Supporting act

- Jay-Z Fall Tour (Jay Z) (2009)
- Attention Deficit Tour (Wale) (2009)
- Loud Tour (Rihanna) (2011)
- Club Paradise Tour (Drake) (2012)
- Rapture Tour (Eminem) (2014)

== Filmography ==
Film and television
Year	Title	Role
2015	J. Cole: Road to Homecoming	Himself
2015	Forest Hills Drive: Homecoming	Himself
2016	Eyez	Himself
2017	J. Cole: 4 Your Eyez Only	Himself
2017	Raising Bertie	Executive producer
2018	Out of Omaha	Executive producer
2019	Dreamville Presents: REVENGE	Himself, executive producer
2021	Applying Pressure: The Off-Season Documentary	Himself, executive producer
