= J. Cole discography =

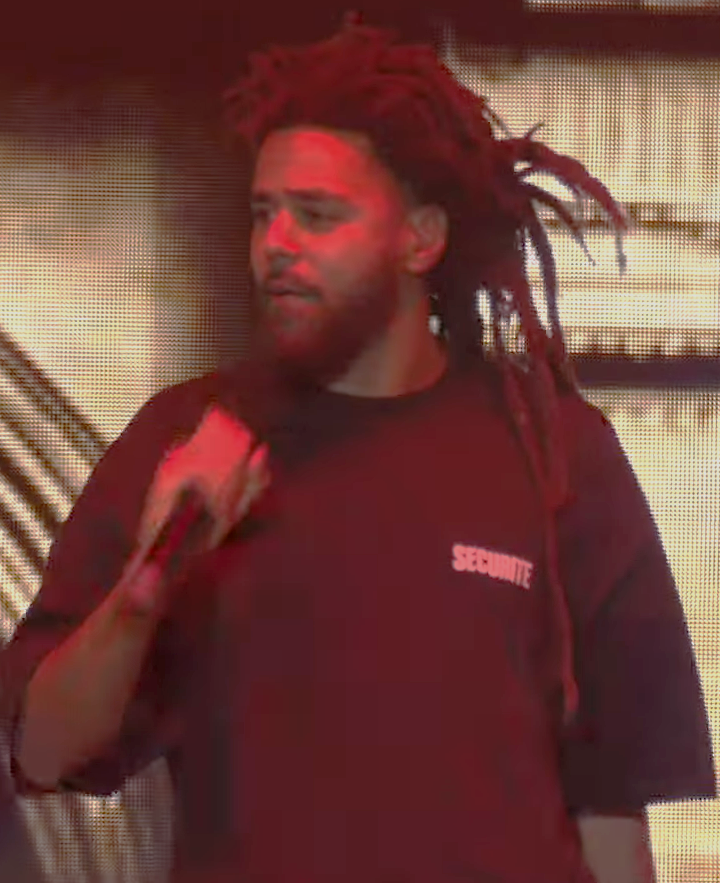
- Cole performing in 2023
- Studio albums: 7
- Extended plays: 4
- Live albums: 1
- Compilation albums: 4
- Singles: 76
- Music videos: 34
- Mixtapes: 4
- Promotional singles: 1

American rapper J. Cole has released seven studio albums, one live album, four compilation albums, four extended plays, four mixtapes, 76 singles (including 37 as a featured artist), two promotional singles, and 33 music videos.

J. Cole first started rapping in his teens, collaborating with the local Fayetteville hip hop duo Bomm Sheltuh. The Come Up, his debut mixtape, was released on May 4, 2007. Following the release of The Come Up, J. Cole was contacted by American rapper Jay-Z and subsequently signed to his record label Roc Nation. Cole released his second mixtape The Warm Up on June 15, 2009. "Lights Please", the first single from The Warm Up, peaked at number nine on the United States Billboard Bubbling Under R&B/Hip-Hop Singles chart and became Cole's first entry on a national record chart. He was later featured on "All I Want Is You", a 2010 single by American R&B singer Miguel – it peaked at number 58 on the US Billboard Hot 100. J. Cole's third mixtape Friday Night Lights was released on November 12, 2010.

J. Cole released his debut studio album Cole World: The Sideline Story on September 27, 2011. It debuted at number one on the US Billboard 200, with first-week sales of 218,000 copies. The album's lead single "Work Out" peaked at number thirteen on the Billboard Hot 100 and became a top-ten hit on the Billboard Hot R&B/Hip-Hop Songs and Hot Rap Songs charts. The album was later certified platinum by the Recording Industry Association of America (RIAA), while "Work Out" was certified a two-time platinum single. Two more singles were released from the album: "Can't Get Enough" and "Nobody's Perfect", which peaked at numbers 52 and 61 respectively on the Hot 100.

J. Cole's second studio album, Born Sinner, was released on June 18, 2013. Its lead single, "Power Trip" (featuring Miguel), peaked at number 19 on the Hot 100 and received a platinum certification from the RIAA.

On December 9, 2014, he released his third studio album 2014 Forest Hills Drive. The album was supported by four singles: "Apparently", "Wet Dreamz", "No Role Modelz", and "Love Yourz". The album sold 353,358 copies in its first week, and became the first rap album in 25 years to be certified platinum in the US with no guest appearances. The songs "No Role Modelz" and "Wet Dreamz" later received a 14× platinum and a 9× platinum certification respectively from the RIAA in December 2024.

In addition to his fourth album, Cole released three singles in 2016: "Love Yourz", "Everybody Dies", and "False Prophets". His album, 4 Your Eyez Only, was released on the second anniversary of 2014 Forest Hills Drive. 4 Your Eyez Only was certified gold before it debuted at number one on the Billboard 200, despite having no singles upon release. "Deja Vu" was later given a single release after peaking at number 7 on the Hot 100. J. Cole's fifth album, KOD, was also a commercial success, as both the album and its individual tracks broke numerous streaming and chart placement records. J. Cole became the first musician ever to debut three new songs in the top 10 on the Billboard Hot 100. As a result of sales and streaming figures, he was the first recording artist to have a trio of tracks open inside the uppermost tier at the same time, with "ATM", "Kevin's Heart", and "KOD". Cole also managed to tie with the Beatles in simultaneously having six positions in the top 20 on the Hot 100 chart, a record that the rock band had previously held for 54 years.

== Albums ==
=== Studio albums ===
List of studio albums, with selected chart positions, sales figures and certifications
Title	Album details	Peak chart positions										Sales	Certifications
Title	Album details	US	AUS	BEL	CAN	DEN	FRA	IRE	NZ	SWI	UK	Sales	Certifications
Cole World: The Sideline Story	Released: September 27, 2011; Label: Roc Nation, Columbia; Formats: CD, LP, digital download	1	52	—	4	—	—	—	36	62	25	US: 855,000	RIAA: Platinum; BPI: Gold; RMNZ: 2× Platinum
Born Sinner	Released: June 18, 2013; Label: Dreamville, Roc Nation, Columbia; Formats: CD, LP, digital download	1	14	—	2	24	—	—	11	27	7	US: 796,000	RIAA: 3× Platinum; BPI: Gold; MC: Gold; RMNZ: 2× Platinum
2014 Forest Hills Drive	Released: December 9, 2014; Label: Dreamville, Roc Nation, Columbia; Formats: CD, LP, digital download	1	40	134	3	—	—	—	25	49	27	US: 1,240,000	RIAA: 6× Platinum; ARIA: Platinum; BPI: Platinum; IFPI DEN: Platinum; MC: Gold; RMNZ: 6× Platinum
4 Your Eyez Only	Released: December 9, 2016; Label: Dreamville, Roc Nation, Interscope; Formats: CD, LP, cassette, digital download	1	6	34	1	16	127	19	10	16	21	US: 523,000 (Note: In 2016, upon the album's release, it sold 363,000 pure copies, and in 2017 it sold 160,000 copies)	RIAA: 2× Platinum; BPI: Gold; RMNZ: Platinum
KOD	Released: April 20, 2018; Label: Dreamville, Roc Nation, Interscope; Formats: CD, LP, digital download	1	1	2	1	4	—	1	1	6	2	US: 273,000 (Note: In 2018, the album sold 273,000 pure copies)	RIAA: 2× Platinum; ARIA: Platinum; BPI: Gold; MC: Gold; RMNZ: Platinum
The Off-Season	Released: May 14, 2021; Label: Dreamville, Roc Nation, Interscope; Formats: CD, LP, digital download	1	3	1	1	1	33	1	1	5	2	US: 102,000 (Note: In 2021 the album sold 102,000 pure copies)	RIAA: Platinum; BPI: Gold; IFPI DEN: Gold; RMNZ: Platinum
The Fall-Off	Released: February 6, 2026; Label: Dreamville, Interscope; Formats: CD, LP, digital download	1	7	16	2	7	70	8	2	2	3	US: 113,000	
"—" denotes a recording that did not chart or was not released in that territory.

=== Live albums ===
List of live albums
Title	Album details	Peak chart positions
Title	Album details	US
Forest Hills Drive: Live From Fayetteville, NC	Released: January 28, 2016; Label: Dreamville, Roc Nation, Columbia; Formats: CD, LP, digital download	71

=== Compilations ===
List of albums, with selected chart positions
Title	Album details	Peak chart positions										Certifications
Title	Album details	US	US R&B/HH	US Rap	AUS	BEL	CAN	FRA	NZ	SWI	UK	Certifications
Revenge of the Dreamers (with Dreamville)	Released: January 28, 2014; Label: Dreamville; Format: Digital download	—	—	—	—	—	—	—	—	—	—	
Revenge of the Dreamers II (with Dreamville)	Released: December 8, 2015; Label: Dreamville, Interscope; Format: CD, digital download	29	4	3	—	—	—	—	—	—	—	
Revenge of the Dreamers III (with Dreamville)	Released: July 5, 2019; Label: Dreamville, Interscope; Format: CD, LP, digital download	1	1	1	2	42	1	126	2	28	—	RIAA: Platinum
D-Day: A Gangsta Grillz Mixtape (with Dreamville)	Released: March 31, 2022; Label: Dreamville, Interscope; Format: Digital download	11	6	4	—	182	27	—	36	—	94	
"—" denotes a recording that did not chart or was not released in that territory.

=== Mixtapes ===
List of mixtapes
Title	Album details	Peak chart positions								
Title	Album details	US	AUS	BEL	CAN	DEN	IRE	NZ	SWI	UK
The Come Up	Released: May 4, 2007; Label: By Any Means; Formats: Digital download, streaming	—	—	—	—	—	—	—	—	—
The Warm Up	Released: June 15, 2009; Label: Roc Nation; Formats: Digital download, streaming	159	—	—	—	—	—	—	—	—
Friday Night Lights	Released: November 12, 2010; Label: Roc Nation; Formats: Digital download, streaming	147	—	—	—	—	—	—	—	—
Might Delete Later	Released: April 5, 2024; Label: Cole World, Inc., Interscope; Formats: Digital download, streaming	2	2	11	3	11	6	1	5	7
"—" denotes a recording that did not chart or was not released in that territory.

== EPs ==
List of extended plays, with selected details
Title	Album details
Truly Yours	Released: February 12, 2013; Label: Dreamville; Format: Digital download
Truly Yours 2	Released: April 30, 2013; Label: Dreamville; Format: Digital download
Lewis Street	Released: July 22, 2020; Label: Dreamville, Roc Nation; Format: Digital download
Birthday Blizzard '26	Released: January 27, 2026; Label: Self-released; Format: Digital download

== Singles ==
=== As lead artist ===
List of singles as lead artist, with selected chart positions and certifications, showing year released and album name
Title	Year	Peak chart positions										Certifications	Album
Title	Year	US	US R&B /HH	US Rap	AUS	CAN	IRE	NZ	SWI	UK	WW	Certifications	Album
"Lights Please"	2009	—	— (Note: "Lights Please" did not enter the Hot R&B/Hip-Hop Songs chart, but peaked at number nine on the Bubbling Under R&B/Hip-Hop Singles chart.)	—	—	—	—	—	—	—	—		The Warm Up and Cole World: The Sideline Story
"Who Dat" (Note: "Who Dat" serves as a bonus track in the iTunes deluxe edition of Cole World: The Sideline Story.)	2010	93	32	19	—	—	—	—	—	—	—		Cole World: The Sideline Story
"Work Out"	2011	13	10	3	—	32	—	—	—	158	—	RIAA: 2× Platinum; ARIA: 3× Platinum; BPI: Platinum; MC: Gold; RMNZ: 7× Platinum	Cole World: The Sideline Story
"Can't Get Enough" (featuring Trey Songz)	2011	52	7	5	—	—	—	—	—	169	—	RIAA: Platinum; BPI: Silver; RMNZ: 2× Platinum	Cole World: The Sideline Story
"Mr. Nice Watch" (featuring Jay-Z)	2011	— (Note: "Mr. Nice Watch" did not enter the Billboard Hot 100, but peaked at number 19 on the Bubbling Under Hot 100 Singles chart.)	87	—	—	—	—	—	—	—	—		Cole World: The Sideline Story
"Nobody's Perfect" (featuring Missy Elliott)	2012	61	3	4	—	—	—	—	—	—	—	RIAA: Gold	Cole World: The Sideline Story
"Miss America"	2012	— (Note: "Miss America" did not enter the Billboard Hot 100, but peaked at number 20 on the Bubbling Under Hot 100 Singles chart.)	34	—	—	—	—	—	—	—	—		Born Sinner
"Power Trip" (featuring Miguel)	2013	19	5	3	—	—	—	—	—	46	—	RIAA: Platinum; ARIA: Gold; BPI: Gold	Born Sinner
"Crooked Smile" (featuring TLC)	2013	27	7	4	—	—	—	—	—	114	—	RIAA: Platinum; BPI: Silver	Born Sinner
"Forbidden Fruit" (featuring Kendrick Lamar)	2013	—	46	—	—	—	—	—	—	—	—		Born Sinner
"She Knows" (featuring Amber Coffman and Cults)	2013	90	24	11	—	—	—	—	—	68	—	ARIA: Platinum; BPI: Platinum	Born Sinner
"Apparently"	2014	58	17	10	—	—	—	—	—	—	—	RIAA: 3× Platinum; BPI: Silver	2014 Forest Hills Drive
"Wet Dreamz"	2015	61	16	12	—	—	—	—	—	—	—	RIAA: 9× Platinum; ARIA: 4× Platinum; BPI: Platinum; IFPI DEN: Gold; RMNZ: 5× Platinum	2014 Forest Hills Drive
"No Role Modelz"	2015	36	20	9	40	62	91	22	—	—	—	RIAA: 1.4× Diamond (14× Platinum); ARIA: 6× Platinum; BPI: 3× Platinum; IFPI DEN: Platinum; RMNZ: 12× Platinum	2014 Forest Hills Drive
"Love Yourz"	2016	—	41	24	—	—	—	—	—	—	—	RIAA: 3× Platinum; ARIA: Gold; BPI: Gold	2014 Forest Hills Drive
"Everybody Dies"	2016	57	29	23	—	93	—	—	—	—	—	RIAA: Gold	Non-album singles
"False Prophets"	2016	54	27	21	—	81	—	—	—	—	—	RIAA: Gold	Non-album singles
"Deja Vu"	2017	7	4	2	45	7	56	— (Note: "Deja Vu" did not enter the NZ Top 40 Singles Chart, but peaked at number two on the NZ Heatseeker Singles Chart.)	46	30	—	RIAA: 3× Platinum; ARIA: 2× Platinum; BPI: Gold	4 Your Eyez Only
"High for Hours"	2017	— (Note: "High for Hours" did not enter the Billboard Hot 100, but peaked at number 22 on the Bubbling Under Hot 100 Singles chart.)	— (Note: "High for Hours" did not enter the Hot R&B/Hip-Hop Songs chart, but peaked at number four on the Bubbling Under R&B/Hip-Hop Singles chart.)	—	—	—	—	— (Note: "High for Hours" did not enter the NZ Top 40 Singles Chart, but peaked at number five on the NZ Heatseeker Singles Chart.)	—	—	—		Non-album single
"Neighbors"	2017	13	8	6	—	17	80	—	96	54	—	RIAA: 4× Platinum; ARIA: 2× Platinum; BPI: Silver	4 Your Eyez Only
"KOD"	2018	10	7	7	20	12	14	10	42	17	—	RIAA: 3× Platinum; BPI: Gold; MC: Platinum	KOD
"ATM"	2018	6	4	4	32	5	32	20	87	28	—	RIAA: 2× Platinum; ARIA: Gold; MC: Gold	KOD
"Album of the Year (Freestyle)"	2018	87	44	—	—	84	—	—	—	—	—		Non-album single
"Shea Butter Baby" (with Ari Lennox)	2019	—	—	—	—	—	—	—	—	—	—	RIAA: Platinum	Creed II: The Album and Shea Butter Baby
"Middle Child"	2019	4	2	2	15	4	3	6	28	9	—	RIAA: Diamond (10× Platinum); ARIA: 5× Platinum; BPI: Platinum; IFPI DEN: Gold; RMNZ: 5× Platinum	Revenge of the Dreamers III
"Down Bad" (with JID, Bas, and EarthGang featuring Young Nudy)	2019	64	26	22	—	69	—	—	—	—	—	RIAA: Gold	Revenge of the Dreamers III
"Snow on tha Bluff"	2020	54	26	23	—	74	—	— (Note: "Snow on tha Bluff" did not enter the NZ Top 40 Singles Chart, but peaked at number 17 on the NZ Hot Singles Chart.)	—	—	—	RIAA: Gold	Non-album single
"The Climb Back"	2020	25	15	13	39	32	50	— (Note: "The Climb Back" did not enter the NZ Top 40 Singles Chart, but peaked at number eight on the NZ Hot Singles Chart.)	—	77	26	RIAA: Platinum; ARIA: Gold; RMNZ: Gold	Lewis Street and The Off-Season
"Lion King on Ice"	2020	51	15	13	87	59	45	— (Note: "Lion King on Ice" did not enter the NZ Top 40 Singles Chart, but peaked at number five on the NZ Hot Singles Chart.)	—	65	—	RIAA: Gold	Lewis Street
"My Life" (with 21 Savage and Morray)	2021	2	1	1	11	8	12	5	34	13	4	RIAA: 2× Platinum; ARIA: Platinum; BPI: Silver	The Off-Season
"The Jackie" (with Bas featuring Lil Tjay)	2021	78	26	—	—	60	—	7	—	100	—		[BUMP] Pick Me Up
"Your Heart" (with Joyner Lucas)	2021	32	10	8	72	34	56	— (Note: "Your Heart" did not enter the NZ Top 40 Singles Chart, but peaked at number three on the NZ Hot Singles Chart.)	—	78	42	RIAA: Platinum	Non-album singles
"Procrastination (Broke)"	2023	—	—	—	—	—	—	—	—	—	—		Non-album singles
"On the Street" (with J-Hope)	2023	60	14	6	83	58	—	— (Note: "On the Street" did not enter the NZ Top 40 Singles Chart, but peaked at number four on the NZ Hot Singles Chart.)	—	37	16		Non-album singles
"The Secret Recipe" (with Lil Yachty)	2023	92	31	—	—	—	—	— (Note: "The Secret Recipe" did not enter the NZ Top 40 Singles Chart, but peaked at number 18 on the NZ Hot Singles Chart.)	—	—	—		The Secret Recipe
"H.Y.B." (with Bas and Central Cee)	2024	35	17	15	73	34	45	36	—	29	47		Might Delete Later
"Grippy" (with Cash Cobain)	2024	—	—	—	—	—	—	— (Note: "Grippy" did not enter the NZ Top 40 Singles Chart, but peaked at number 16 on the NZ Hot Singles Chart.)	—	—	—		Non-album singles
"Port Antonio"	2024	—	—	—	—	—	—	—	—	—	—		Non-album singles
"Clouds"	2025	69	21	13	—	94	—	— (Note: "Clouds" did not enter the NZ Top 40 Singles Chart, but peaked at number 7 on the NZ Hot Singles Chart.)	—	—	175		Non-album singles
"Who TF Iz U"	2026	32	11	7	—	59	—	—	—	—	88		The Fall-Off
"Legacy" (with PJ)	2026	36	14	10	—	65	—	—	—	—	101		The Fall-Off
"—" denotes a recording that did not chart or was not released in that territory.

=== As featured artist ===
List of singles as featured artist, with selected chart positions, showing year released and album name
Title	Year	Peak chart positions										Certifications	Album
Title	Year	US	US R&B /HH	US Rap	AUS	CAN	IRE	NZ	SWI	UK	WW	Certifications	Album
"Just Begun" (Reflection Eternal featuring J. Cole, Mos Def and Jay Electronica)	2010	—	—	—	—	—	—	—	—	—	—		Revolutions per Minute
"All I Want Is You" (Miguel featuring J. Cole)	2010	58	7	—	—	—	—	—	—	—	—	RIAA: Platinum; BPI: Silver	All I Want Is You
"A Star Is Born" (Jay Z featuring J. Cole)	2010	—	91	—	—	—	—	—	—	—	—		The Blueprint 3
"Feel Love" (Sean Garrett featuring J. Cole)	2011	—	49	—	—	—	—	—	—	—	—		Non-album singles
"Bad Girls Club" (Wale featuring J. Cole)	2011	—	—	—	—	—	—	—	—	—	—		Non-album singles
"Trouble" (Bei Maejor featuring J. Cole)	2011	— (Note: "Trouble" did not enter the Billboard Hot 100, but peaked at number 13 on the Bubbling Under Hot 100 Singles chart, which acts as an extension to the Hot 100.)	34	—	—	—	—	—	—	—	—		Non-album singles
"Only Wanna Give It to You" (Elle Varner featuring J. Cole)	2011	—	20	—	—	—	—	—	—	—	—		Perfectly Imperfect
"Party" (Remix) (Beyoncé featuring J. Cole)	2011	—	—	—	—	—	—	—	—	—	—		Non-album single
"This Time" (Melanie Fiona featuring J. Cole)	2012	—	89	—	—	—	—	—	—	—	—		The MF Life
"Acid Rain" (Remix) (Alexis Jordan featuring J. Cole)	2013	—	—	—	—	—	—	—	—	—	—		Non-album single
"Cold Blood" (Yo Gotti featuring J. Cole and Canei Finch)	2013	—	50	—	—	—	—	—	—	—	—		I Am
"Planez" (Jeremih featuring J. Cole)	2015	44	15	—	—	—	—	—	—	—	—	RIAA: 5× Platinum; BPI: Gold	Late Nights
"No Sleeep" (Janet Jackson featuring J. Cole)	2015	63	18	—	—	—	—	—	—	—	—		Unbreakable
"Night Job" (Bas featuring J. Cole)	2016	—	—	—	—	—	—	—	—	—	—	RIAA: Gold	Too High to Riot
"Can't Call It" (Spillage Village featuring EarthGang, JID, J. Cole and Bas)	2016	—	—	—	—	—	—	—	—	—	—		Bears Like This Too Much
"Tribe" (Bas featuring J Cole)	2018	—	—	—	—	—	—	—	—	—	—	RIAA: Platinum; BPI: Silver	Milky Way
"Off Deez" (JID featuring J. Cole)	2018	—	—	—	—	—	—	—	—	—	—	RIAA: Platinum; ARIA: Gold	DiCaprio 2
"Boblo Boat" (Royce da 5'9 featuring J. Cole)	2018	—	—	—	—	—	—	—	—	—	—		Book of Ryan
"Sojourner" (Rapsody featuring J. Cole)	2018	—	—	—	—	—	—	—	—	—	—		9th Wonder Presents: Jamla Is the Squad II
"Come Through and Chill" (Miguel featuring J. Cole & Salaam Remi)	2018	— (Note: "Come Through and Chill" did not enter the Billboard Hot 100, but peaked at number one on the Bubbling Under Hot 100 Singles chart, which acts as an extension to the Hot 100.)	44	—	—	—	—	—	—	—	—	RIAA: Platinum; RMNZ: 2× Platinum	War & Leisure
"A Lot" (21 Savage featuring J. Cole)	2019	12	5	5	61	21	25	26	79	29	—	RIAA: 5× Platinum; BPI: Platinum; MC: Platinum	I Am > I Was
"How Did I Get Here" (Offset featuring J. Cole)	2019	65	30	—	—	72	—	—	—	—	—		Father of 4
"Purple Emoji" (Ty Dolla $ign featuring J. Cole)	2019	— (Note: "Purple Emoji" did not enter the Billboard Hot 100, but peaked at number 11 on the Bubbling Under Hot 100 chart.)	—	—	—	—	—	—	—	—	—	RIAA: Gold	Non-album single
"The London" (Young Thug featuring J. Cole and Travis Scott)	2019	12	6	5	17	6	18	8	20	18	—	RIAA: 3× Platinum; ARIA: Platinum; BPI: Platinum; MC: 2× Platinum; RMNZ: Gold	So Much Fun
"Family and Loyalty" (Gang Starr featuring J. Cole)	2019	—	—	—	—	—	—	—	—	—	—		One of the Best Yet
"Poke It Out" (Wale featuring J. Cole)	2021	79	28	12	—	—	—	—	—	—	—		Folarin II
"Johnny P's Caddy" (Benny the Butcher featuring J Cole)	2022	72	22	14	—	84	—	—	—	—	139		Tana Talk 4
"Scared Money" (YG featuring J. Cole and Moneybagg Yo)	2022	73	25	17	—	75	—	— (Note: "Scared Money" did not enter the NZ Top 40 Singles Chart, but peaked at number 8 on the NZ Hot Singles Chart.)	—	—	176	RIAA: Gold	I Got Issues
"London" (Bia featuring J. Cole)	2022	62	20	16	—	55	—	—	—	—	130		Really Her
"90 Proof" (Smino featuring J. Cole)	2022	—	—	—	—	—	—	—	—	—	—		Luv 4 Rent
"All My Life" (Lil Durk featuring J. Cole)	2023	2	1	1	9	8	22	10	69	14	7	RIAA: 2× Platinum; ARIA: Platinum; MC: Platinum; BPI: Gold	Almost Healed
"There I Go" (Gucci Mane featuring J. Cole and Mike Will Made It)	2023	94	27	22	—	—	—	—	—	—	—		Breath of Fresh Air
"Passport Bros" (Bas featuring J. Cole)	2023	—	—	—	—	—	—	—	—	—	—		We Only Talk About Real Shit When We're Fucked Up
"First Person Shooter" (Drake featuring J. Cole)	2023	1	1	1	4	2	7	5	10	4	2	ARIA: Gold; BPI: Silver	For All the Dogs
"Ruby Rosary" (A$AP Rocky featuring J. Cole)	2024	85	22	21	—	92	—	—	—	—	—		Non-album single
"A Plate of Collard Greens" (Daylyt featuring J. Cole)	2024	—	—	—	—	—	—	—	—	—	—		TBA
"Blow for Blow" (Tee Grizzley featuring J. Cole)	2024	88	23	20	—	—	—	— (Note: "Blow for Blow" did not enter the NZ Top 40 Singles Chart, but peaked at number three on the NZ Hot Singles Chart.)	—	—	—		Post Traumatic
"—" denotes a recording that did not chart or was not released in that territory.

=== Promotional singles ===
List of promotional singles, with selected chart positions and certifications, showing year released and album name
Title	Year	Peak chart positions										Certifications	Album
Title	Year	US	US R&B /HH	US Rap	AUS	CAN	IRE	NZ	SWI	UK	WW	Certifications	Album
"Interlude"	2021	8	5	3	20	16	18	7	56	25	8	RIAA: Platinum; ARIA: Gold	The Off-Season

== Other charted and certified songs ==
List of songs, with selected chart positions and certifications, showing year released and album name
Title	Year	Peak chart positions										Certifications	Album
Title	Year	US	US R&B /HH	US Rap	AUS	CAN	IRE	NZ	SWE	UK	WW	Certifications	Album
"Too Deep for the Intro"	2010	—	—	—	—	—	—	— (Note: "Too Deep for the Intro" did not enter the NZ Top 40 Singles Chart, but peaked at number 33 on the NZ Hot Singles Chart.)	—	—	—		Friday Night Lights
"Blow Up"	2010	—	— (Note: "Blow Up" did not enter the Hot R&B/Hip-Hop Songs chart, but peaked at number 17 on the Bubbling Under R&B/Hip-Hop Singles chart, which acts as an extension to the R&B/Hip-Hop Songs chart.)	—	—	—	—	—	—	—	—		Friday Night Lights
"In the Morning" (featuring Drake)	2010	— (Note: "In the Morning" did not enter the Billboard Hot 100, but peaked at number 17 on the Bubbling Under Hot 100 Singles chart, which acts as an extension to the Hot 100.)	57	—	—	—	—	—	—	—	—	RIAA: Gold; BPI: Silver	Friday Night Lights and Cole World: The Sideline Story
"Undercover" (DJ Drama featuring Chris Brown and J. Cole)	2011	—	— (Note: "Undercover" did not enter the Hot R&B/Hip-Hop Songs chart, but peaked at number 15 on the Bubbling Under R&B/Hip-Hop Singles chart, which acts as an extension to the R&B/Hip-Hop Songs chart.)	—	—	—	—	—	—	—	—		Third Power
"Love and War" (Rita Ora featuring J. Cole)	2012	—	—	—	—	—	—	—	—	193	—		Ora
"Villuminati"	2013	—	— (Note: "Villuminati" did not enter the Hot R&B/Hip-Hop Songs chart, but peaked at number one on the Bubbling Under R&B/Hip-Hop Singles chart, which acts as an extension to the R&B/Hip-Hop Songs chart.)	—	—	—	—	—	—	—	—		Born Sinner
"Rich Niggaz"	2013	—	— (Note: "Rich Niggaz" did not enter the Hot R&B/Hip-Hop Songs chart, but peaked at number ten on the Bubbling Under R&B/Hip-Hop Singles chart, which acts as an extension to the R&B/Hip-Hop Songs chart.)	—	—	—	—	—	—	—	—		Born Sinner
"Let Nas Down"	2013	—	— (Note: "Let Nas Down" did not enter the Hot R&B/Hip-Hop Songs chart, but peaked at number five on the Bubbling Under R&B/Hip-Hop Singles chart, which acts as an extension to the R&B/Hip-Hop Songs chart.)	—	—	—	—	—	—	—	—		Born Sinner
"Born Sinner" (featuring James Fauntleroy II)	2013	—	— (Note: "Born Sinner" did not enter the Hot R&B/Hip-Hop Songs chart, but peaked at number three on the Bubbling Under R&B/Hip-Hop Singles chart, which acts as an extension to the R&B/Hip-Hop Songs chart.)	—	—	—	—	—	—	—	—		Born Sinner
"January 28th"	2014	— (Note: "January 28th" did not enter the Billboard Hot 100, but peaked at number 24 on the Bubbling Under Hot 100 Singles chart, which acts as an extension to the Hot 100.)	46	—	—	—	—	—	—	—	—	RIAA: Platinum	2014 Forest Hills Drive
"03' Adolescence"	2014	— (Note: "03' Adolescence" did not enter the Billboard Hot 100, but peaked at number 23 on the Bubbling Under Hot 100 Singles chart, which acts as an extension to the Hot 100.)	45	—	—	—	—	—	—	—	—	RIAA: Platinum; RMNZ: Gold	2014 Forest Hills Drive
"A Tale of 2 Citiez"	2014	— (Note: "A Tale of 2 Citiez" did not enter the Billboard Hot 100, but peaked at number seven on the Bubbling Under Hot 100 Singles chart, which acts as an extension to the Hot 100.)	33	25	—	—	—	—	—	—	—	RIAA: 2× Platinum; BPI: Silver	2014 Forest Hills Drive
"Fire Squad"	2014	— (Note: "Fire Squad" did not enter the Billboard Hot 100, but peaked at number five on the Bubbling Under Hot 100 Singles chart, which acts as an extension to the Hot 100.)	31	24	—	—	—	—	—	—	—	RIAA: Platinum; BPI: Silver	2014 Forest Hills Drive
"St. Tropez"	2014	—	50	—	—	—	—	—	—	—	—	RIAA: Gold	2014 Forest Hills Drive
"G.O.M.D."	2014	— (Note: "G.O.M.D." did not enter the Billboard Hot 100, but peaked at number nine on the Bubbling Under Hot 100 Singles chart, which acts as an extension to the Hot 100.)	34	—	—	—	—	—	—	—	—	RIAA: 4× Platinum; BPI: Gold	2014 Forest Hills Drive
"Note to Self"	2014	—	—	—	—	—	—	—	—	—	—	RIAA: Gold	2014 Forest Hills Drive
"Jermaine's Interlude" (DJ Khaled featuring J. Cole)	2016	—	— (Note: "Jermaine's Interlude" did not enter the Hot R&B/Hip-Hop Songs chart, but peaked at number one on the Bubbling Under R&B/Hip-Hop Singles chart, which acts as an extension to the R&B/Hip-Hop Songs chart.)	—	—	—	—	—	—	—	—		Major Key
"For Whom the Bell Tolls"	2016	23	13	11	—	31	—	—	—	82	—	RIAA: Gold	4 Your Eyez Only
"Immortal"	2016	11	6	4	57	12	71	— (Note: "Immortal" did not enter the NZ Top 40 Singles Chart, but peaked at number four on the NZ Heatseeker Singles Chart.)	98	49	—	RIAA: Platinum; ARIA: Platinum; BPI: Silver	4 Your Eyez Only
"Ville Mentality"	2016	24	14	12	—	32	—	—	—	78	—	RIAA: Platinum	4 Your Eyez Only
"She's Mine, Pt. 1"	2016	22	12	10	—	34	—	—	—	81	—	RIAA: Platinum	4 Your Eyez Only
"Change"	2016	21	11	9	—	23	—	—	—	63	—	RIAA: Platinum; ARIA: Gold	4 Your Eyez Only
"Foldin Clothes"	2016	30	18	15	—	37	—	—	—	89	—	RIAA: Gold	4 Your Eyez Only
"She's Mine, Pt. 2"	2016	34	21	17	—	53	—	—	—	—	—	RIAA: Gold	4 Your Eyez Only
"4 Your Eyez Only"	2016	29	17	14	—	43	—	—	—	99	—	RIAA: Platinum	4 Your Eyez Only
"Intro"	2018	53	32	—	—	73	90	—	—	—	—		KOD
"Photograph"	2018	14	9	8	41	19	36	26	— (Note: "Photograph" did not enter the Swedish Singellista Chart, but peaked at number six on the Swedish Heatseeker Chart.)	30	—	RIAA: Platinum; ARIA: Gold	KOD
"The Cut Off" (featuring Kill Edward)	2018	28	19	15	—	38	51	—	—	—	—	RIAA: Gold	KOD
"Motiv8"	2018	15	10	9	47	23	37	—	— (Note: "Motiv8" did not enter the Swedish Singellista Chart, but peaked at number five on the Swedish Heatseeker Chart.)	—	—	RIAA: Platinum; ARIA: Gold	KOD
"Kevin's Heart"	2018	8	5	5	46	16	38	28	— (Note: "Kevin's Heart" did not enter the Swedish Singellista Chart, but peaked at number eight on the Swedish Heatseeker Chart.)	56	—	RIAA: 3× Platinum; ARIA: Platinum; BPI: Silver	KOD
"Brackets"	2018	30	20	16	—	46	56	—	—	—	—	RIAA: Platinum	KOD
"Once an Addict"	2018	47	29	24	—	75	76	—	—	—	—	RIAA: Gold	KOD
"Friends" (featuring Kill Edward)	2018	46	28	23	—	57	72	—	—	—	—	RIAA: Gold	KOD
"Window Pain"	2018	41	26	22	—	63	75	—	—	—	—	RIAA: Gold	KOD
"1985"	2018	20	14	12	—	32	41	—	— (Note: "1985" did not enter the Swedish Singellista Chart, but peaked at number 12 on the Swedish Heatseeker Chart.)	—	—	RIAA: Platinum; ARIA: Gold	KOD
"Trippy" (Anderson .Paak featuring J. Cole)	2018	—	—	—	—	—	—	23	—	—	—		Oxnard
"Pretty Little Fears" (6lack featuring J. Cole)	2018	76	35	—	—	65	76	— (Note: "Pretty Little Fears" did not enter the NZ Top 40 Singles Chart, but peaked at number 13 on the NZ Hot Singles Chart.)	— (Note: "Pretty Little Fears" did not enter the Swedish Singellista Chart, but peaked at number 11 on the Swedish Heatseeker Chart.)	86	—	RIAA: 2× Platinum; MC: Platinum; BPI: Silver	East Atlanta Love Letter
"Say Na" (Moneybagg Yo featuring J. Cole)	2018	—	—	—	—	—	—	—	—	—	—	RIAA: Platinum; ARIA: Gold	Reset
"Under the Sun" (with Dreamville and Lute featuring DaBaby)	2019	44	18	16	—	72	—	—	—	—	—	RIAA: 2x Platinum	Revenge of the Dreamers III
"Jodeci Freestyle" (Drake featuring J. Cole)	2019	— (Note: "Jodeci Freestyle" did not enter the Billboard Hot 100, but peaked at number 18 on the Bubbling Under Hot 100 chart.)	—	—	—	—	—	—	—	—	—		Care Package
"95 South"	2021	8	6	4	22	13	—	— (Note: "95 South" did not enter the NZ Top 40 Singles Chart, but peaked at number five on the NZ Hot Singles Chart.)	94	—	11	RIAA: Platinum	The Off-Season
"Amari"	2021	5	3	2	14	7	15	12	58	16	8	RIAA: Platinum; ARIA: Gold; BPI: Silver	The Off-Season
"Applying Pressure"	2021	13	9	7	28	21	—	—	— (Note: "Applying Pressure" did not enter the Swedish Singellista Chart, but peaked at number five on the Swedish Heatseeker Chart.)	—	14	RIAA: Gold	The Off-Season
"Punchin' the Clock"	2021	20	14	12	33	25	—	—	— (Note: "Punchin' the Clock" did not enter the Swedish Singellista Chart, but peaked at number 12 on the Swedish Heatseeker Chart.)	—	20	RIAA: Gold	The Off-Season
"100 Mil'" (with Bas)	2021	14	10	8	30	24	—	—	— (Note: "100 Mil'" did not enter the Swedish Singellista Chart, but peaked at number nine on the Swedish Heatseeker Chart.)	—	16	RIAA: Gold	The Off-Season
"Pride Is the Devil" (with Lil Baby)	2021	7	5	3	15	10	13	8	59	15	9	RIAA: 2× Platinum; ARIA: Platinum; BPI: Silver	The Off-Season
"Let Go My Hand" (with Bas and 6lack)	2021	19	13	11	27	23	—	—	— (Note: "Let Go My Hand" did not enter the Swedish Singellista Chart, but peaked at number two on the Swedish Heatseeker Chart.)	—	—	RIAA: Gold	The Off-Season
"Close"	2021	33	22	19	49	37	—	—	—	—	34		The Off-Season
"Hunger on Hillside" (with Bas)	2021	28	17	15	46	33	—	—	—	—	29	RIAA: Gold	The Off-Season
"Stressed" (with Young Thug and T-Shyne)	2021	69	25	17	—	84	—	— (Note: "Stressed" did not enter the NZ Top 40 Singles Chart, but peaked at number 16 on the NZ Hot Singles Chart.)	—	—	114		Punk
"Stick" (with Dreamville and JID featuring Kenny Mason and Sheck Wes)	2022	71	20	16	—	82	—	— (Note: "Stick" did not enter the NZ Top 40 Singles Chart, but peaked at number 22 on the NZ Hot Singles Chart.)	—	—	160		D-Day: A Gangsta Grillz Mixtape
"Freedom of Speech" (with Dreamville)	2022	— (Note: "Freedom of Speech" did not enter the Billboard Hot 100, but peaked at number 24 on the Bubbling Under Hot 100 Singles chart, which acts as an extension to the Hot 100.)	—	—	—	—	—	— (Note: "Freedom of Speech" did not enter the NZ Top 40 Singles Chart, but peaked at number 34 on the NZ Hot Singles Chart.)	—	—	—		D-Day: A Gangsta Grillz Mixtape
"Heaven's EP" (with Dreamville)	2022	—	—	—	—	—	—	— (Note: "Heaven's EP" did not enter the NZ Top 40 Singles Chart, but peaked at number 36 on the NZ Hot Singles Chart.)	—	—	—		D-Day: A Gangsta Grillz Mixtape
"Evil Ways" (Drake featuring J. Cole)	2023	26	10	9	—	31	—	— (Note: "Evil Ways" did not enter the NZ Top 40 Singles Chart, but peaked at number five on the NZ Hot Singles Chart.)	—	—	50		For All the Dogs Scary Hours Edition
"Let Me Calm Down" (Nicki Minaj featuring J. Cole)	2023	63	14	11	—	68	—	—	—	—	121		Pink Friday 2
"Pricey" (with Ari Lennox featuring Young Dro and Gucci Mane)	2024	29	13	12	—	49	—	— (Note: "Pricey" did not enter the NZ Top 40 Singles Chart, but peaked at number five on the NZ Hot Singles Chart.)	—	—	—		Might Delete Later
"Crocodile Tearz"	2024	19	9	8	71	29	64	— (Note: "Crocodile Tearz" did not enter the NZ Top 40 Singles Chart, but peaked at number four on the NZ Hot Singles Chart.)	—	53	56		Might Delete Later
"Ready '24" (featuring Cam'ron)	2024	38	20	17	—	57	—	—	—	—	31		Might Delete Later
"Huntin' Wabbitz"	2024	28	12	11	—	45	—	—	—	—	55		Might Delete Later
"Fever"	2024	59	27	—	—	68	—	—	—	—	139		Might Delete Later
"Stickz n Stonez"	2024	53	23	20	—	67	—	—	—	—	126		Might Delete Later
"Pi" (featuring Daylyt and Ab-Soul)	2024	62	29	25	—	96	—	—	—	—	170		Might Delete Later
"Stealth Mode" (with Bas)	2024	65	30	—	—	92	—	—	—	—	187		Might Delete Later
"3001"	2024	72	34	—	—	—	—	—	—	—	—		Might Delete Later
"Trae the Truth in Ibiza"	2024	66	31	—	—	95	—	—	—	—	198		Might Delete Later
"7 Minute Drill"	2024	6	2	2	42	17	44	26	—	38	14		Might Delete Later
"Red Leather" (with Future and Metro Boomin)	2024	39	16	13	—	58	—	— (Note: "Red Leather" did not enter the NZ Top 40 Singles Chart, but peaked at number nine on the NZ Hot Singles Chart.)	—	—	97		We Still Don't Trust You
"29 Intro"	2026	53	—	—	—	92	—	—	—	—	178		The Fall-Off
"Two Six"	2026	16	3	1	73	26	57	— (Note: "Two Six" did not enter the NZ Top 40 Singles Chart, but peaked at number 3 on the NZ Hot Singles Chart.)	—	45	33		The Fall-Off
"Safety"	2026	29	9	5	—	43	66	— (Note: "Safety" did not enter the NZ Top 40 Singles Chart, but peaked at number 4 on the NZ Hot Singles Chart.)	—	51	59		The Fall-Off
"Run a Train" (with Future)	2026	33	12	8	—	58	—	— (Note: "Run a Train" did not enter the NZ Top 40 Singles Chart, but peaked at number 6 on the NZ Hot Singles Chart.)	—	—	76		The Fall-Off
"Poor Thang"	2026	30	10	6	—	47	81	— (Note: "Poor Thang" did not enter the NZ Top 40 Singles Chart, but peaked at number 5 on the NZ Hot Singles Chart.)	—	—	61		The Fall-Off
"Bunce Road Blues" (with Future and Tems)	2026	34	13	9	—	55	—	—	—	59	75		The Fall-Off
"Drum n Bass"	2026	46	17	12	—	77	—	—	—	—	149		The Fall-Off
"The Let Out"	2026	43	15	11	—	69	—	—	—	—	126		The Fall-Off
"Bombs in the Ville/Hit the Gas"	2026	52	19	14	—	89	—	—	—	—	176		The Fall-Off
"Lonely at the Top"	2026	75	26	23	—	—	—	—	—	—	—		The Fall-Off
"39 Intro"	2026	59	—	18	—	84	—	—	—	—	192		The Fall-Off
"The Fall-Off Is Inevitable"	2026	68	23	20	—	96	—	—	—	—	—		The Fall-Off
"The Villest" (with Erykah Badu)	2026	72	24	21	—	—	—	—	—	—	—		The Fall-Off
"Old Dog" (with Petey Pablo)	2026	64	22	19	—	94	—	—	—	—	—		The Fall-Off
"Life Sentence"	2026	73	25	22	—	—	—	—	—	—	—		The Fall-Off
"Only You" (with Burna Boy)	2026	78	28	25	—	—	—	—	—	—	—		The Fall-Off
"Man Up Above"	2026	99	37	—	—	—	—	—	—	—	—		The Fall-Off
"I Love Her Again"	2026	83	31	—	—	97	—	—	—	—	—		The Fall-Off
"What If" (with Morray)	2026	— (Note: "What If" did not enter the Billboard Hot 100, but peaked at number 1 on the Bubbling Under Hot 100 chart.)	42	—	—	—	—	—	—	—	—		The Fall-Off
"Quik Stop"	2026	100	38	—	—	—	—	—	—	—	—		The Fall-Off
"And the Whole World Is the Ville"	2026	— (Note: "And the Whole World Is the Ville" did not enter the Billboard Hot 100, but peaked at number 2 on the Bubbling Under Hot 100 chart.)	45	—	—	—	—	—	—	—	—		The Fall-Off
"Ocean Way"	2026	— (Note: "Ocean Way" did not enter the Billboard Hot 100, but peaked at number 7 on the Bubbling Under Hot 100 chart.)	—	—	—	—	—	—	—	—	—		The Fall-Off
"—" denotes a recording that did not chart or was not released in that territory.

== Guest appearances ==
List of guest appearances on other artists' songs, with year of release and album name shown
Title	Year	Other artist(s)	Album
"Rather Be with You (Vagina Is for Lovers)"	2009	Wale, Currensy	Back to the Feature
"Beautiful Bliss"	2009	Wale, Melanie Fiona	Attention Deficit
"Gladiators"	2010	B.o.B	May 25th
"Still the Hottest"	2010	Young Chris	The Network 2
"Look in the Mirror" (Remix)	2010	Yo Gotti, Wale, Wiz Khalifa	none
"Looking for Trouble"	2010	Kanye West, Pusha T, Big Sean, Cyhi the Prynce	none
"Buyou"	2010	Keri Hilson	No Boys Allowed
"Leave Me Alone"	2011	Kevin Cossom	By Any Means
"S&M" (Remix)	2011	Rihanna	none
"Champion" (Remix)	2011	Chipmunk, Chris Brown	none
"Relaxation"	2011	Fashawn, Omen	Higher Learning Vol. 2
"Nothing for the Radio"	2011	Fashawn	Higher Learning Vol. 2
"Never Holdin' Me Back"	2011	Travis Barker	Let the Drummer Get Wicked
"Killers"	2011	Alex Haldi	The Glorification of Gangster
"Let It Go"	2011	StartYourOwnRebellion	LP3020
"Fitted Cap"	2011	Wale, Rick Ross, Meek Mill	Self Made Vol. 1
"Pity"	2011	Voli, Omen	In the Meanwhile
"Undercover"	2011	DJ Drama, Chris Brown	Third Power
"Mama Told Me"	2011	Omen	Afraid of Heights
"World Premiere"	2011	Elite	Awaken
"Like It or Love It"	2011	Tinie Tempah, Wretch 32	Happy Birthday
"Fly Together" (Remix)	2012	Red Café, Trey Songz, Wale	Hell's Kitchen
"I'm On 2.0"	2012	Trae tha Truth, Mark Morrison, Big K.R.I.T., Jadakiss, Kendrick Lamar, B.o.B, Tyga, Gudda Gudda, Bun B	Tha Blackprint
"Let It Show"	2012	Tyga	Careless World: Rise of the Last King
"Drank in My Cup" (Remix)	2012	Kirko Bangz	Progression 2: A Young Texas Playa
"Roll Call"	2012	Trae tha Truth	Welcome 2 the Streets
"Sound of Love"	2012	Voli	The Wall
"They Ready"	2012	DJ Khaled, Big K.R.I.T., Kendrick Lamar	Kiss the Ring
"Love and War"	2012	Rita Ora	Ora
"Green Ranger"	2012	Lil Wayne	Dedication 4
"24 Karats of Gold"	2012	Big Sean	Detroit
"Riggamuffin (Remix)"	2012	Selah Sue	Rarities
"Diamonds"	2012	French Montana, Rick Ross	Mac & Cheese 3
"Louis Vuitton"	2012	Fabolous	The S.O.U.L. Tape 2
"Pray"	2012	The Game, JMSN	Jesus Piece
"Maine on Fire"	2013	Funkmaster Flex	Who You Mad At? Me or Yourself?
"Lit"	2013	Bas, KQuick	Quarter Water Raised Me Vol. II
"Jodeci Freestyle"	2013	Drake	Care Package
"Black Grammys"	2013	Wale, Rockie Fresh, Meek Mill	Self Made Vol. 3
"Hells Kitchen"	2013	DJ Khaled, Bas	Suffering from Success
"T.K.O. (Black Friday Remix)"	2013	Justin Timberlake, A$AP Rocky, Pusha T	—N/a
"Knock tha Hustle" (Remix)	2014	Cozz	Cozz & Effect
"My Nigga Just Made Bail"	2014	Bas	Last Winter
"Animals" (Remix)	2014	Maroon 5	none
"Vendetta"	2014	Elijah Blake	none
"The Pessimist"	2015	Wale	The Album About Nothing
"Black Heaven"	2015	Boosie Badazz, Keyshia Cole	Touchdown 2 Cause Hell
"Warm Enough"	2015	Chance the Rapper, Noname Gypsy	Surf
"Children of Men"	2015	Trae tha Truth	Tha Truth
"Jermaine's Interlude"	2016	DJ Khaled	Major Key
"Legendary"	2017	Joey Bada$$	All-Amerikkkan Badass
"AfricAryan"	2017	Logic, Neil deGrasse Tyson	Everybody
"American Dream"	2017	Jeezy, Kendrick Lamar	Pressure
"Zendaya"	2018	Cozz	Effected
"OSOM"	2018	Jay Rock	Redemption
"Pretty Little Fears"	2018	6lack	East Atlanta Love Letter
"My Boy (Freestyle)"	2018	Wale	Free Lunch – EP
"Say Na"	2018	Moneybagg Yo	RESET
"Trippy"	2018	Anderson .Paak	Oxnard
"Under the Sun"	2019	Lute, DaBaby	Revenge of the Dreamers III
"Oh Wow...Swerve"	2019	Zoink Gang, Key!, Maxo Kream	Revenge of the Dreamers III
"1993"	2019	Buddy, Smino, Cozz, EarthGang, JID	Revenge of the Dreamers III
"Rembrandt...Run It Back"	2019	JID, Vince Staples	Revenge of the Dreamers III
"Sunset"	2019	Young Nudy	Revenge of the Dreamers III
"Sacrifices"	2019	EarthGang, Smino & Saba	Revenge of the Dreamers III
"Prove It"	2019	Big K.R.I.T.	K.R.I.T. Iz Here
"Stressed"	2021	Young Thug, T-Shyne	Punk
"Waterboyz"	2022	EarthGang, JID	Ghetto Gods
"Stick"	2022	JID, Kenny Mason, Sheck Wes	D-Day: A Gangsta Grillz Mixtape
"Freedom of Speech"	2022	—N/a	D-Day: A Gangsta Grillz Mixtape
"Heaven's EP"	2022	—N/a	D-Day: A Gangsta Grillz Mixtape
"Adonis Interlude (The Montage)"	2023	—N/a	Creed III (soundtrack)
"To Summer, from Cole- Audio Hug"	2023	Summer Walker	Clear 2: Soft Life EP
"Thanks"	2023	Burna Boy	I Told Them...
"Evil Ways"	2023	Drake	For All the Dogs Scary Hours Edition
"Let Me Calm Down"	2023	Nicki Minaj	Pink Friday 2
"Home Alone"	2023	Bas	We Only Talk About Real Shit When We're Fucked Up
"Paper Cuts"	2023	Bas	We Only Talk About Real Shit When We're Fucked Up
"Red Leather"	2024	Future, Metro Boomin	We Still Don't Trust You
"Free Fall"	2024	Tems	Born in the Wild
"OFG!"	2026	Mike Will Made It	R3set
"Mighty Mouse"	2026	PFG	Never Say Die
"Whole House"	2026	PFG	Never Say Die
"Twins Forever" (remix)	2026	PFG	Never Say Die

== Music videos ==
=== As lead artist ===
List of music videos as lead artist, showing year released and director(s)
Title	Year	Director(s)
"Simba"	2008	BB Gun; Adam Roy
"Lights Please"	2009	BB Gun; Adam Roy
"Who Dat"	2010	BB Gun; Adam Roy
"In the Morning" (featuring Drake)	2011	
"Work Out"	2011	Clifton Bell
"Can't Get Enough" (featuring Trey Songz)	2011	Clifton Bell
"Daddy's Little Girl"	2011	Axel Laramée
"Lost Ones"	2011	BB Gun
"Nobody's Perfect" (featuring Missy Elliott)	2012	Colin Tilley
"Sideline Story"	2012	Adam Roy; Axel Laramée
"Power Trip" (featuring Miguel)	2013	Nabil; Mike Piscitelli
"Crooked Smile" (featuring TLC)	2013	Sheldon Candis
"She Knows" (featuring Amber Coffman and Cults)	2014	Sam Pilling
"Lights Please"	2014	BB Gun
"Intro (2014 Forest Hills Drive)"	2014	Scott Lazes
"Apparently"	2014	Scott Lazes
"G.O.M.D"	2015	Lawrence Lamont
"Wet Dreamz"	2015	Ryan Staake
"Love Yourz (Live)"	2016	Steve Carr
"Everybody Dies"	2016	Scott Lazer
"False Prophets"	2016	Scott Lazer
"4 Your Eyez Only"	2017	Scott Lazer; J. Cole
"ATM"	2018	Scott Lazer; J. Cole
"Kevin's Heart"	2018	Scott Lazer; J. Cole
"Album of the Year (Freestyle)"	2018	Simone David
"Middle Child"	2019	Mez
"Fire Squad"	2020	Maxim Bohichik
"Amari"	2021	Mez
"Applying Pressure"	2021	Ryan Marie Helfant
"Punchin' the Clock"	2021	Ryan Marie Helfant
"Heaven's EP"	2021	Simon Chasalow
"Stick"	2022	
"The Fall-Off Is Inevitable"	2026	Ryan Doubiago
"Two Six"	2026	Simon Chasalow

=== As featured artist ===
List of music videos as featured artist, showing year released and director(s)
Title	Year	Director(s)
"All I Want Is You" (Miguel featuring J. Cole)	2010	Alex Moore
"Feel Love" (Sean Garrett featuring J. Cole)	2011	Taj
"Trouble" (Bei Maejor featuring J. Cole)	2011	Declan Whitebloom
"Only Wanna Give It to You" (Elle Varner featuring J. Cole)	2011	Orson Whales
"Party" (Remix) (Beyoncé featuring J. Cole)	2011	Alan Ferguson, Beyoncé Knowles
"Bad Girls Club" (Wale featuring J. Cole)	2011	Rock Jacobs
"I'm On 2.0" (Trae Tha Truth featuring J. Cole, Kendrick Lamar, B.o.B, Jadakiss, Tyga, Mark Morrison, Gudda Gudda and Bun B)	2012	Phillyflyboy
"This Time" (Melanie Fiona featuring J. Cole)	2012	Colin Tilley
"Diamonds" (French Montana featuring J. Cole and Rick Ross)	2013	Edgar Esteves
"Lit" (Bas featuring J. Cole and KQuick)	2013	Justin Benoliel
"Black Grammys" (MMG featuring J. Cole)	2014	Unknown
"Cold Blood" (Yo Gotti featuring J. Cole & Canei Finch)	2014	Unknown
"My Nigga Just Made Bail" (Bas featuring J. Cole)	2014	Ramble West
"Knock tha Hustle (Remix)" (Cozz featuring J. Cole)	2014	Unknown
"No Sleeep" (Janet Jackson featuring J. Cole)	2015	Dave Meyers
"Night Job" (Bas featuring J. Cole)	2016	Andrew Nisinson for The Super Mookin Fiends
"Children of Men" (Trae the Truth featuring J. Cole)	2016	Unknown
"Boblo Boat" (Royce da 5'9 featuring J. Cole)	2018	J. Cole
"OSOM" (Jay Rock featuring J. Cole)	2018	Dave Free
"Tribe" (Bas featuring J. Cole)	2018	Andrew Nisinson
"Pretty Little Fears" (6lack featuring J. Cole)	2018	Matthew Dillon Cohen
"Say Na" (Moneybagg Yo featuring J. Cole)	2018	N/A
"Off Deez" (JID with J. Cole)	2018	Cole Bennett
"A Lot" (21 Savage featuring J. Cole)	2019	Aisultan Seitov
"Shea Butter Baby" (Ari Lennox featuring J. Cole)	2019	Bennett Johnson
"Purple Emoji" (Ty Dolla Sign featuring J. Cole)	2019	Olivia Rose
"Sacrifices" (Dreamville featuring EarthGang, J. Cole, Smino & Saba)	2019	Scott Lazer, David Peters, Chad Tennies
"Under the Sun" (Dreamville featuring J. Cole, Lute & DaBaby)	2019	Aisultan Seitov, David Peters, Scott Lazer, Chad Tennies
"Family and Loyalty" (Gang Starr featuring J. Cole)	2019	Fab 5 Freddy
"Down Bad" (Dreamville featuring J. Cole, JID, Young Nudy, Bas and Earthgang)	2019	Chad Tennies, Mac Grant, Caleb Seales, Mike Dan
"The London" (Young Thug featuring Travis Scott and J. Cole)	2019	
"Poke It Out" (Wale featuring J. Cole)	2021	
"The Jackie" (Bas featuring J. Cole & Lil Jay)	2021	
"Your Heart' (Joyner Lucas featuring J. Cole)	2022	
"Johnny P's Caddy" (Benny the Butcher featuring J. Cole)	2022	
"London" (Bia featuring J. Cole)	2022	
"Scared Money' (YG featuring J. Cole and Moneybagg Yo)	2022	
"90 Proof" (Smino featuring J. Cole)	2022	Phillip Youmans
"All My Life" (Lil Durk featuring J. Cole)	2023	
"There I Go" (Gucci Mane featuring Mike Will Made-It & J. Cole)	2023	
"On the Street" (J-Hope featuring J. Cole)	2023	
"The Secret Recipe" (Lil Yachty featuring J. Cole)	2023	
"Passport Bros" (Bas featuring J. Cole)	2023	
"First Person Shooter" (Drake featuring J. Cole)	2023	Gibson Hazard
"Blow for Blow" (Tee Grizzley featuring J. Cole)	2024	@JerryPHD
