= KOD =

KOD, K.O.D., KoD, Kod or Köd may refer to

== Music ==
- Kitchens of Distinction, an English alternative rock band
- K.O.D. (Tech N9ne album)
- KOD (album), a 2018 album by J. Cole
  - "KOD" (song), from the album
- "K.O.D.", a song by Slaughter to Prevail

== Other uses ==
- Knockout (KO'd)
- Committee for the Defence of Democracy (Polish: Komitet Obrony Demokracji)
- King of Donair, a Canadian restaurant chain
- Kiss-o'-Death (KoD) packets, a technical solution to NTP server misuse and abuse
- Köd, a village in Năpradea, Romania
