= Angles (song) =

2021 single by Wale featuring Chris Brown

Single by Wale featuring Chris Brown

from the album Folarin II
- Released: June 18, 2021
- Genre: Hip hop; R&B
- Length: 2:54
- Label: Maybach; Warner
- Songwriters: Olubowale Akintimehin; Chris Brown; Prince Chrishan
- Producers: $K; Hitmaka; LouXtwo; OG Parker

Wale singles chronology
"Options" (2021)	"Angles" (2021)	"Down South" (2021)

Chris Brown singles chronology
"Baddest" (2021)	"Angles" (2021)	"Woo Baby" (2021)

Music video
- "Angles" on YouTube

"Angles" is a song by American rapper Wale featuring American singer Chris Brown, released on June 18, 2021 through Warner Records as the lead single from Wale's seventh studio album Folarin II.

== Background and content ==
Wale posted on his social media platforms, announcing that the song would've been released at night. OG Parker, one of the main producers for the song, said that the inspiration came from the hip hop track "I Need a Girl": "Wale creates brilliant poems about his feelings for his leading lady, some of which are light-hearted and others which are sadder."

== Composition ==
The song is written in the key of F Minor, with a tempo of 95 beats per minute. The song was produced by $K, Hitmaka, LouXtwo and OG Parker, it was also samples from "I Need a Girl" (2002) by Puff Daddy, Usher and Loon. Wale on the track showcases some of his wordplay: "You saying the universe ain't grateful / I'll put Infinity Stones on all your fingers", displaying his feelings: "Maybe, I got your heart / Maybe I can't love you, 'cause I don't know where to start", while Chris Brown's hook was deemed "reflective" and "sensual": "You know the way to pose, you know, you know your angles / I can't tame you, I can't change you".

== Critical reception ==
Rachel George of ABC Audio commented that the song "is the perfect anthem for any summer song playlist". The Source's reviewer Shawn Grant stated that Brown on the track "once again proves to be the hook king". Ayana Rashed of Revolt praised Wale's "memorable wordplay and quippy pickups" on the track, affirming that Brown's chorus is "sensual" and "essential to the song".

== Music video ==
An accompanying music video was released on June 22, 2021, and directed by Daniel CZ. The characteristic of video is Wale "showering his woman with blue and white flowers, before taking her out for a romantic dinner." Subsequently nearby a pool, Brown and Wale "performing the feel-good tune" in between scenes.

== Track listing ==
- Digital download and streaming (Explicit)
1. "Angles" (featuring Chris Brown) – 2:54
- Digital download and streaming (Clean)
1. "Angles" [Clean] (featuring Chris Brown) – 2:54
- Digital download and streaming (Club Mix)
1. "Angles" [Club Mix] (featuring Chris Brown) – 2:55
- Digital download and streaming (Instrumental)
1. "Angles" [Instrumental] (featuring Chris Brown) – 2:55

== Credits and personnel ==
Credits adapted from AllMusic.

- $K – producer
- Wale – composer, primary artist, vocals
- Chris Brown – composer, featured artist, vocals
- Chrishan – composer
- Hitmaka – producer
- LouXtwo – producer
- OG Parker – producer
- Kevin Spencer – mastering engineer, mixing

== Charts ==
=== Weekly charts ===
Weekly chart performance for "Angles"
Chart (2021)	Peak position
New Zealand Hot Singles (RMNZ)	10
US Bubbling Under Hot 100 (Billboard)	6
US Hot R&B/Hip-Hop Songs (Billboard)	44
US R&B/Hip-Hop Airplay (Billboard)	15
US Radio Songs (Billboard)	45
US Rhythmic Airplay (Billboard)	4

=== Year-end charts ===
Year-end chart performance for "Angles"
Chart (2021)	Position
US Rhythmic (Billboard)	39

== Release history ==
Release history for "Angles"
Region	Date	Format	Label	Ref.
Various	June 18, 2021	Digital download; streaming	Warner	
United States	June 22, 2021	Rhythmic contemporary	MMG; Warner	
