= List of number-one albums of 2018 (Canada) =

These are the Canadian number-one albums of 2018. The chart is compiled by Nielsen SoundScan and published in Billboard magazine as Top Canadian Albums.

== Number-one albums ==
Key
†	Indicates best-performing album of 2018

Issue date	Album	Artist(s)	Ref.
January 3	Revival	Eminem	
January 6	Revival	Eminem	
January 13	÷	Ed Sheeran	
January 20	÷	Ed Sheeran	
January 27	Camila	Camila Cabello	
February 3	÷	Ed Sheeran	
February 10	Culture II	Migos	
February 17	Man of the Woods	Justin Timberlake	
February 24	Black Panther: The Album	Soundtrack	
March 3	Black Panther: The Album	Soundtrack	
March 10	Black Panther: The Album	Soundtrack	
March 17	Memories Don't Die	Tory Lanez	
March 24	Bobby Tarantino II	Logic	
March 31	?	XXXTentacion	
April 7	Boarding House Reach	Jack White	
April 14	My Dear Melancholy,	The Weeknd	
April 21	Invasion of Privacy	Cardi B	
April 28	Invasion of Privacy	Cardi B	
May 5	KOD	J. Cole	
May 12	Graffiti U	Keith Urban	
May 19	Beerbongs & Bentleys	Post Malone	
May 26	Beerbongs & Bentleys	Post Malone	
June 2	Beautiful Trauma	Pink	
June 9	Shawn Mendes	Shawn Mendes	
June 16	Ye	Kanye West	
June 23	Beerbongs & Bentleys	Post Malone	
June 30	?	XXXTentacion	
July 7	Pray for the Wicked	Panic! at the Disco	
July 14	Scorpion †	Drake	
July 21	Scorpion †	Drake	
July 28	Scorpion †	Drake	
August 4	Scorpion †	Drake	
August 11	Scorpion †	Drake	
August 18	Astroworld	Travis Scott	
August 25	Astroworld	Travis Scott	
September 1	Sweetener	Ariana Grande	
September 8	Love Yourself: Answer	BTS	
September 15	Kamikaze	Eminem	
September 22	Kamikaze	Eminem	
September 29	Cry Pretty	Carrie Underwood	
October 6	Kamikaze	Eminem	
October 13	Tha Carter V	Lil Wayne	
October 20	A Star Is Born	Lady Gaga and Bradley Cooper	
October 27	A Star Is Born	Lady Gaga and Bradley Cooper	
November 3	A Star Is Born	Lady Gaga and Bradley Cooper	
November 10	A Star Is Born	Lady Gaga and Bradley Cooper	
November 17	A Star Is Born	Lady Gaga and Bradley Cooper	
November 24	Origins	Imagine Dragons	
December 1	Delta	Mumford & Sons	
December 8	Love	Michael Bublé	
December 15	Championships	Meek Mill	
December 22	Love	Michael Bublé	
December 29	A Star Is Born	Lady Gaga and Bradley Cooper	

== See also ==
- List of Canadian Hot 100 number-one singles of 2018
