= Snow on tha Bluff (song) =

2020 single by J.Cole

Single by J. Cole
- Released: June 16, 2020
- Genre: Political hip hop
- Length: 3:55
- Label: Dreamville; Roc Nation; Interscope
- Songwriters: Jermaine Cole; Kelvin Wooten
- Producers: Wu10; Cole

J. Cole singles chronology
"Family and Loyalty" (2019)	"Snow on tha Bluff" (2020)	"The Climb Back" / "Lion King on Ice" (2020)

"Snow on tha Bluff" is a song by American rapper J. Cole. Named after the 2012 drama film of the same name, the track addresses an unnamed woman, assumed to be fellow rapper and activist Noname, while touching on police brutality and race relations. The track's critical reception was mixed, and albeit with some praise for Cole's lyricism, with most criticizing him for taking aim at Noname.

It was released on June 16, 2020, marking J. Cole's first release of 2020.

== Background ==
"Snow on Tha Bluff" was released in the midst of the George Floyd protests, which J. Cole participated in, in his hometown of Fayetteville, North Carolina. In late May 2020, prior to the song's release and five days after the murder of George Floyd, rapper Noname made a tweet widely panning wealthy rappers who discussed the struggles of black people in their music but had yet to publicly speak out via social media regarding the protests or Black Lives Matter in general. The tweet read:

Poor black folks all over the country are putting their bodies on the line in protest for our collective safety and y'all favorite top selling rappers not even willing to put a tweet up. niggas whole discographies be about black plight and they no where to be found.

Many assumed her tweet was aimed mainly at Cole and Kendrick Lamar, both of whom had yet to post on social media about the protests at the time of her tweeting. Throughout the song, Cole makes reference to an unnamed "young woman", who many listeners assumed to be Noname, which was mostly confirmed by Cole himself via Twitter. J. Cole and Noname previously collaborated in 2015, on the song "Warm Enough" from Donnie Trumpet and The Social Experiment's Surf album. The song's title was derived from the 2012 drama film of the same name about real-life Atlanta-based drug dealer Curtis Snow. According to Ben Kaye of Consequence of Sound, "The film was shot documentary-style, leaving some — including the Atlanta Police Department — convinced it was real. On the track, J. Cole turns that concept of perceived reality on himself, questioning if he 'ain't doing enough' in the Black Lives Matter movement". Produced with Wu10, it is J. Cole's first release of 2020.

== Composition and lyrics ==
"Snow on tha Bluff" is a "pensive" conscious hip hop song with a guitar-based instrumental. A "poem-esque" cut, the song contains a nonstop verse about the political and racial unrest in America, notably the Black Lives Matter protests surrounding the murder of George Floyd, Ahmaud Arbery and Breonna Taylor. J. Cole addresses racism, activism, organizing, social media, police brutality, as well as his celebrity status. In the first verse, he makes claims directed at a "young lady", (Noname) who, according to Cole, is alienating her people due to her "tone". Cole further references raising two children, and gives advice to activists such as Noname: "I would say it's more effective to treat people like children. Understanding the time and love and patience that's needed to grow".

== Critical reception ==
Critics took issue with the song for a number of reasons, including what they believed to be Cole making excuses for himself. Rolling Stone's Charles Holmes suggested that the backlash Cole received was warranted, writing, "Cole makes a litany of excuses. Despite going to college, he suggests, he's not as deep or intellectual as everyone thinks he is. Being rich is actually hard, because he feels guilty that he's not doing enough with his wealth. Then the kicker arrives at the song's climax: 'If I could make one more suggestion respectfully / I would say it's more effective to treat people like children'. At 35 years old, J. Cole is upset that a woman didn't expend enough energy and sympathy to teach and critique him as if he were a child". Zoe Haylock of Vulture echoed a similar sentiment, writing, "J. Cole's idea of being 'gentle' with Noname is spending the majority of 'Snow on Tha Bluff' making assumptions about her and excuses for himself. [...] Instead of just being up front about those insecurities, he spends over half of the song dragging an unnamed woman many assumed to be Noname." In a review for Pitchfork, Alphonse Pierre sarcastically remarked, "Jermaine is only 35 years old. A boy. How could she have expected him to be as informed as she is? But he did it! He showed that meanie! After lashing out in the booth, I imagine Jermaine stuck his tongue out at her, before placing a Band-Aid—with cartoons—on his bruised ego."

Many critics also took issue with the timing of the release of the song, with GQ's Julian Kimble writing that "[Cole] weaponizes male insecurity when there are literal lives at stake". Kimble added that, Cole's "big bro act" does not hold up on the song, noting how, in 2018, Cole took the "big bro" route before: "He had a sit-down with rapper Lil Pump in 2018 after the up-and-comer took offense to what he perceived to be criticism from his more traditional peer. 'Snow on Tha Bluff', however, is a case of that conservatism turning misogynistic." Lawrence Burney of The Fader called the track "poorly-timed" and said, "Cole isn't a monster for admitting that he knows he can do more and that he actually isn't qualified [...], but releasing a song that takes passive-aggressive jabs at a woman in the middle of a racial struggle and during a week in which Black women's abuse and forced silence has been a pressing topic, he has shown at the very least that his ego has been prioritized over a fight that is much bigger than him."

In a negative review, Miakel Wood of the Los Angeles Times found the song to be "paternalistic and tin-eared" and said it falls short of the moment. Insider included the song on a list of the ten worst songs of 2020.

Conversely, some critics praised the song's lyrics and production. Lars Brandle of Billboard called the song a "lyrical dynamite", and further noted how Cole "flows on social injustice, hardship and life in the ghettos, his words pouring over a dreamy production." Rap-Up called the song "powerful."

== Other responses ==
Shortly after the song's release, Noname tweeted "QUEEN TONE!!!!!!", referencing a lyric in the song, but later deleted the tweet. Many other artists defended Noname or spoke out against Cole, including Ari Lennox, who is signed to Cole's Dreamville label. Lennox thanked Noname "for giving af about us constantly and endlessly", saying she appreciates "everything you [Noname] put out to the world." Chance the Rapper, whom Noname collaborated with on Acid Rap, also criticized Cole, calling the song "not constructive", and said it "undermines all the work Noname has done." Cole eventually addressed backlash he received for the song in a series of tweets, defending his statements in the song and encouraging listeners to follow Noname on social media.

=== Song 33 ===
"Song 33"

Single by Noname
- Released: June 18, 2020
- Genre: Political hip hop
- Length: 1:09
- Producer: Madlib

Noname singles chronology
"Häagen Dazs" (2019)	"Song 33" (2020)	"Rainforest" (2021)

Two days after the release of "Snow on tha Bluff", Noname released the "brief but vehement" Madlib-produced "Song 33", in which she alluded to Cole writing about her in the wake of the protests, rapping: "I guess the ego hurt now / It's time to go to work, wow, look at him go / He really 'bout to write about me when the world is in smokes? When there's people in trees? When George was beggin' for his mother sayin' he couldn't breathe? He thought to write about me?" The song also reflects on violence against Black women, mainly the death of 19-year-old Black Lives Matter activist Oluwatoyin Salau.

Neither artist ever mentioned the other's name explicitly in their work. Cole did however acknowledge Noname's track shortly after its release, sharing a link to the song on Twitter, as well as confirming in that he was referring to Noname in interviews.

== Cover art ==
The cover art and audio video features some of the song's lyrics, which appears were written on June 4, 2020, the date on the cover.

== Charts ==
Chart performance for "Snow on tha Bluff"
Chart (2020)	Peak position
Canada Hot 100 (Billboard)	74
New Zealand Hot Singles (RMNZ)	17
US Billboard Hot 100	54
US Hot R&B/Hip-Hop Songs (Billboard)	26

== Certifications ==
Region	Certification	Certified units/sales
United States (RIAA)	Gold	500,000^{‡}
^{‡} Sales+streaming figures based on certification alone.
