= Kevin's Heart =

Song by American rapper J. Cole

Song by J. Cole

from the album KOD
- Released: April 20, 2018
- Recorded: 2017
- Genre: Hip hop, trap
- Length: 3:20
- Label: Dreamville; Roc Nation; Interscope
- Songwriters: Cole; Tyler Williams; Mark Pellizzer
- Producers: T-Minus; Mark Pelli

Music video
- "Kevin's Heart" on YouTube

Audio sample
- "Kevin's Heart": file; help

"Kevin's Heart" is a song by American rapper J. Cole, released on April 20, 2018 from his fifth studio album, KOD. It was written alongside producers T-Minus and Mark Pelli, making it the only track on the album not to be produced by Cole. The song’s title is a reference to American comedian Kevin Hart, who appears in the music video as well.

== Lyrical interpretation ==
Vice said the song "considers the thinking behind a man's unfaithfulness. The fact that the song goes its entirety without the offender once blaming his spouse for his actions is a serious "whew" moment. Here, Cole frames temptation as a habit that needs kicking." Billboard mentioned that "the song tells the tale of fighting off the urge to cheat."

== Music video ==
On April 24, 2018, Cole released the music video for the song, "Kevin's Heart". The video features the song's namesake, American comedian Kevin Hart, and was directed by Cole and Scott Lazer.

== Critical reception ==
Pitchfork called the song a standout saying "Cole uses the pint-sized comedian's very public infidelities to reflect on the challenge of monogamy: "My phone be blowing up/Temptations on my line/I stare at the screen a while before I press decline." Cole is most effective when he keeps things personal rather than turning up his nose at the choices of others."

== Commercial performance ==
Upon its first week of release, "Kevin's Heart" debuted at number eight on the US Billboard Hot 100. On July 29, 2020, "Kevin's Heart" was certified platinum by the Recording Industry Association of America (RIAA) for combined sales of one million units in the United States.

== Charts ==
Chart (2018)	Peak position
Australia (ARIA)	46
Canada Hot 100 (Billboard)	16
Ireland (IRMA)	38
New Zealand (Recorded Music NZ)	28
Portugal (AFP)	33
Sweden Heatseeker (Sverigetopplistan)	8
US Billboard Hot 100	8
US Hot R&B/Hip-Hop Songs (Billboard)	5

== Certifications ==
Region	Certification	Certified units/sales
Australia (ARIA)	Platinum	70,000^{‡}
Portugal (AFP)	Gold	5,000^{‡}
United Kingdom (BPI)	Silver	200,000^{‡}
United States (RIAA)	3× Platinum	3,000,000^{‡}
^{‡} Sales+streaming figures based on certification alone.
