= ATM (J. Cole song) =

Single by J. Cole

from the album KOD
- Released: July 31, 2018
- Recorded: 2018
- Genre: Hip hop
- Length: 3:36
- Label: Dreamville; Roc Nation; Interscope
- Songwriter: Jermaine Cole
- Producer: J. Cole

J. Cole singles chronology
"KOD" (2018)	"ATM" (2018)	"Album of the Year (Freestyle)" (2018)

Music video
- "ATM" on YouTube

Audio sample
- file; help

"ATM" (an acronym for "Addicted to Money") is a single by American rapper J. Cole, released on April 20, 2018, from his fifth studio album, KOD, and was produced solely by himself. "ATM" was sent to US rhythmic contemporary radio on July 31, 2018, as the album's second single. The track debuted at number six on the US Billboard Hot 100.

== Composition and samples ==
The song contains excerpts and samples of "I'll Never Stop Loving You", as written by Nicholas Brodszky and Sammy Cahn, and performed by Ahmad Jamal.

== Lyrical interpretation ==
On Twitter, J. Cole revealed the title can be interpreted as an abbreviation for "Addicted to Money" and MTV said "[one] of the addicitons that J. Cole confronts on KOD is humanity's addiction to money, and he tackles it on the song 'ATM', the title of which is pretty self-explanatory."

== Music video ==
Screenshot from ATM music video.

A music video for "ATM" was released on April 20, 2018, the same day as the release of the album. The video was directed by Cole and Scott Lazer and produced by Jefferis Gray. Cole plays multiple roles in the video, such as wrapped in a black leather straitjacket locked in a room padded with $100 bills. He also loses all his chips at a blackjack table and literally pays an arm and a leg for a used car. He also thanked Busta Rhymes for his 1998 music video "Gimme Some More" saying "Flipmode is the greatest. Thank you for the inspiration big bro."

== Critical reception ==
Spin said "Like spiking the candy bowl with medicine, he adapts the stylistic tics—triplets and trap drums, mostly—of so-called mumble and Soundcloud rappers, many of whom revel in the vices he's denouncing. "ATM" and its Hype Williams-styled video is perhaps the best example. Complete with a hyper-repetitive chorus, he satirizes capitalistic greed with the bluster of a club banger." Vice said "ATM" at times feels like a parody of contemporary rappers when his elected flow and content are considered along with each.

=== Accolades ===
Its official music video received two nominations for Best Hip-Hop Video and Best Art Direction at the 2018 MTV Video Music Awards.

== Usage in media ==
The song was featured in the official 2018 NBA Playoffs commercial for ESPN.

== Chart performance ==
Upon its first week of release, "ATM" debuted at number six on the US Billboard Hot 100. The song is J. Cole's fourth highest-charting song after "Amari", "Middle Child", and "My Life", respectively. On July 29, 2020, "ATM" was certified platinum by the Recording Industry Association of America (RIAA) for combined sales of one million units in the United States.

== Charts ==
Chart (2018)	Peak position
Australia (ARIA)	32
Canada Hot 100 (Billboard)	5
Ireland (IRMA)	32
Netherlands (Single Top 100)	8
New Zealand (Recorded Music NZ)	1
Portugal (AFP)	5
Sweden (Sverigetopplistan)	7
Switzerland (Schweizer Hitparade)	6
UK Singles (Official Charts)	28
US Billboard Hot 100	6
US Hot R&B/Hip-Hop Songs (Billboard)	1
US Rhythmic Airplay (Billboard)	6

== Certifications ==
Region	Certification	Certified units/sales
Australia (ARIA)	Gold	35,000^{‡}
Canada (Music Canada)	Gold	40,000^{‡}
United States (RIAA)	2× Platinum	2,000,000^{‡}
^{‡} Sales+streaming figures based on certification alone.
