= Folarin II =

2021 studio album by Wale

Studio album by Wale
- Released: October 22, 2021
- Genre: Hip-hop
- Length: 47:14
- Labels: Every Blue Moon; Maybach; Warner
- Producers: 8 Bars; Cool & Dre; Coop The Truth; D.Woo; Dammo Farmer; DJ Khalil; DJ Money; Dylan Graham; DZL; Endless Torch; Freaky Rob; Good Intent; Harry Fraud; Hitmaka; Illmaestro; J.U.S.T.I.C.E. League; JuJu The Producer; Lee Major; LouXtwo; Maneesh; Marcè Reazon; No Credit; OG Parker; Quintin Gulledge; Rance 1500; Rogét Chahayed; $K; Some Randoms; Steven Felix; Super Miles; Tone Jonez; Trizzy; VA; Wale

Wale chronology
Wow... That's Crazy (2019)	Folarin II (2021)	Everything Is a Lot (2025)

Singles from Folarin II
- 1. "Angles" Released: June 18, 2021; 2. "Down South" Released: August 12, 2021; 3. "Poke It Out" Released: September 30, 2021

Folarin II is the seventh studio album by American rapper Wale released on October 22, 2021, by Every Blue Moon, Maybach Music Group and Warner Records. The production on the album was handled by several producers, including Cool & Dre, DJ Khalil, Harry Fraud, Hitmaka, J.U.S.T.I.C.E. League, Lee Major, OG Parker and Rogét Chahayed among others. The album features guest appearances by Rick Ross, Chris Brown, J. Cole, Jamie Foxx, Ant Clemons, Yella Beezy, Maxo Kream, Chase Young, and Shawn Stockman. The album was executive produced by Ross and Wale. It is the sequel to Wale's 2012 mixtape Folarin.

Folarin II was supported by three singles: "Angles" featuring Chris Brown, "Down South" featuring Yella Beezy and Maxo Kream and "Poke It Out" featuring J. Cole.

== Promotion ==
The lead single from the album, "Angles" featuring American singer Chris Brown, released on June 18, 2021. The music video for the song was released on June 22, 2021, three days after the single came out. The song was produced by OG Parker, Hitmaka, John $K McGee, and LouXtwo. The song samples "I Need a Girl" by Puff Daddy, Usher and Loon. The song did not enter the Billboard Hot 100 but peaked at number 6 on the Bubbling Under Hot 100 chart. And the song also peaked at number 44 on the Hot R&B/Hip-Hop Songs chart.

The second single from the album, "Down South" featuring American rappers Yella Beezy and Maxo Kream, was released on August 12, 2021. The song's music video was released on October 15, 2021. The song was produced by Harry Fraud. The song sampled "Stay Tippin" by Mike Jones, Paul Wall and Slim Thug.

The third and final single from the album, "Poke It Out" featuring American rapper J. Cole, was released on September 30, 2021. The music video for the song was premiered on October 4, 2021, three days after the single was released. The song was produced by Cool & Dre. The song samples "Vivrant Thing" by Q-Tip. The song debuted at number 73 on the Billboard Hot 100. Also, the song debuted at number 21 on the Hot R&B/Hip-Hop Songs and at number 12 on the Hot Rap Songs charts.

The music video for the song, "Tiffany Nikes", premiered on March 1, 2022.

== Critical reception ==
Professional ratings
Review scores
Source	Rating
AllMusic	2.5/5 stars

== Commercial performance ==
Folarin II debuted at number 22 on the US Billboard 200, earning 20,000 album-equivalent units (including 2,900 pure album sales) in its first week. The album also peaked at number twelve on the US Top R&B/Hip-Hop Albums and at number eleven on the US Top Rap Albums charts, which marks both Wale's seventh entry on the charts.

== Track listing ==
Credits were adapted from Genius, Spotify and Tidal.

Folarin II track listing
No.	Title	Writer(s)	Producer(s)	Length
1.	"New Balances"	Olubowale Akintimehin; Miles Franklin; Cooper McGill	Super Miles; Coop The Truth	3:06
2.	"Name Ring Bell"	Akintimehin; Travon Howard; Rexton Gordan; Wycliffe Johnson; Cleveland Browne; Melissa Elliott; Tim Mosley; A. Richards	Trizzy	3:08
3.	"Poke It Out" (featuring J. Cole)	Akintimehin; Jermaine Cole; Marcello Valenzano; Andre Lyon; Jonathan Davis; James Yancey; Barry Carter	Cool & Dre	3:03
4.	"Tiffany Nikes"	Akintimehin; Marty Valentine; Derrell Able; Dammo Farmer; Larrance Dopson; Quintin Gulledge; Norva Denton; Steve Felix; George Michael; Johnny Douglas	Good Intent; Endless Torch; Farmer^{[a]}; Rance 1500^{[a]}; Gulledge^{[a]}; VA^{[b]}; Felix^{[b]}	2:12
5.	"Caramel"	Akintimehin; Leigh Elliott; Stevano Maestro; Faith Evans; Sean Combs; Chucky Thompson; Michael Keith; Quinness Parker	Lee Major; Illmaestro	3:21
6.	"Fluctuate"	Akintimehin; Khalil Abdul-Rahman	DJ Khalil	3:53
7.	"Light Years" (featuring Rick Ross)	Akintimehin; William Roberts; Eric Ortiz; Kevin Crowe; Kenneth Bartolomei; Jason Carr	J.U.S.T.I.C.E. League; 8 Bars	3:53
8.	"Angles" (featuring Chris Brown)	Akintimehin; Christopher Brown; Christian Ward; Joshua Isaih Parker; John McGee; Lasse Qvist; Combs; Usher Raymond IV; Chauncey Hawkins; Christopher Dotson	Hitmaka; OG Parker; $K; LouXtwo	3:28
9.	"Dearly Beloved" (featuring Jamie Foxx)	Akintimehin; Eric Bishop; Marcè Ayala; Maneesh Bidaye	Marcè Reazon; Wale; Maneesh^{[c]}	1:49
10.	"More Love" (featuring Shawn Stockman of Boyz II Men and Hot Sauce of Backyard Band)	Akintimehin; Shawn Stockman; Keith Robinson; Franklin; Zachary Young; Antonio Jonez; Dylan Graham	Super Miles; DJ Money; Tone Jonez^{[a]}; Graham^{[a]}	3:13
11.	"Jump In" (featuring Lil' Chris of T.O.B.)	Akintimehin; Christopher Proctor; Julian Nixon; Kevin Spencer	JuJu The Producer; No Credit^{[a]}	3:31
12.	"Down South" (featuring Yella Beezy and Maxo Kream)	Akintimehin; Emekwanem Biosah Jr.; Markies Conway; Rory Quigley; Michael Jones; Paul Slayton; Stayve Thomas; Salih Williams; Richard Jones; Chad Butler; Bernard Freeman; Percy Miller Sr.	Harry Fraud	3:59
13.	"Extra Special" (featuring Ant Clemons)	Akintimehin; Anthony Clemons Jr.; Rogét Chahayed; Matt Campfield; Daniel Klein; Bryant Cephus	Chahayed; Some Randoms	2:45
14.	"Fire & Ice"	Akintimehin; Darius Wooten; Stokley Williams; Homer O'Dell; Larry Waddell; Jeff Allen; Keri Lewis; Rich Kinchen	D.Woo	2:36
15.	"Beverly Blvd"	Akintimehin; Michael Holmes; Bidaye; Rob Gueringer	DZL; Maneesh; Freaky Rob	3:50
Total length:				47:14

=== Notes ===
- ^{^[a]} signifies a co-producer
- ^{^[b]} signifies an additional producer
- ^{^[c]} signifies an uncredited producer

=== Sample credits ===
- "Name Ring Bell" contains samples from "Ting-A-Ling", written by Rexton Gordan, Wycliffe Johnson and Cleveland Browne, and performed by Shabba Ranks; and an interpolation from "Make It Hot", written by Melissa Elliott, Tim Mosley and A. Richards, and performed by Nicole Wray.
- "Poke It Out" contains samples from "Vivrant Thing", written by Jonathan Davis, James Yancey and Barry Carter, and performed by Q-Tip.
- "Tiffany Nikes" contains samples from "Amazing", written by George Michael and Johnny Douglas, and performed by George Michael.
- "Caramel" contains samples from "Caramel Kisses", written by Faith Evans, Sean Combs, Chucky Thompson, Michael Keith and Quinnes Parker, and performed by Faith Evans featuring 112.
- "Angles" contains samples from "I Need a Girl (Part One)", written by Sean Combs, Usher Raymond and Chauncey Hawkins, and performed by P. Diddy featuring Usher and Loon.
- "Dearly Beloved" contains an excerpt and a sample from the episode, "Always Follow Your Heart", from The Jamie Foxx Show.
- "Down South" contains samples from "Still Tippin'", written by Michael Jones, Paul Slayton, Stayve Thomas and Salih Williams, performed by Mike Jones featuring Paul Wall and Slim Thug; and an interpolation from "Slangin'", written by Richard Jones, Chad Butler, Bernard Freeman and Percy Miller Sr., performed by Fiend featuring UGK and Master P.
- "Fire & Ice" contains samples from "This Day, This Minute, Right Now", written and performed by Mint Condition.

== Charts ==
Chart performance for Folarin II
Chart (2021)	Peak position
US Billboard 200	22
US Top R&B/Hip-Hop Albums (Billboard)	12
US Top Rap Albums (Billboard)	11
