= Motiv8 (song) =

Song by J. Cole

from the album KOD
- Released: April 20, 2018
- Recorded: 2017
- Genre: Hip hop; trap
- Length: 2:13
- Label: Dreamville; Roc Nation; Interscope
- Songwriters: Jermaine Cole; Roy Ayers; James Bedford; Lamont Porter; Sylvia Striplin; Christopher Wallace
- Producer: J. Cole T-Minus

"Motiv8" (pronounced "motivate") is a song by American rapper J. Cole, released on April 20, 2018 from his fifth studio album, KOD.

== Composition and samples ==
The song contains an uncredited sample from "Knuck If You Buck", performed by Crime Mob; and excerpts from "Get Money", as written by Roy Ayers, James Bedford, Lamont Porter, Sylvia Striplin and Chris Wallace, and performed by Junior M.A.F.I.A.

== Lyrical interpretation ==
HotNewHipHop said "another track that’s been getting a lot of attention lately is this song called “Motiv8.” [...] Cole hops on this self-produced beat and raps about being motivated to get the money, something he repeats throughout the song & chorus."

== Critical reception ==
Alexis Petridis of The Guardian said "Motiv8 revolves around little more than an eerie keyboard figure and a disembodied cry of “get money” from Lil Kim's guest appearance on the 1995 Junior MAFIA hit of the same title – ripped out of context, it sounds bleak and despairing." KentWired said “Another song I feel like will be played on the radio a lot. Also, another favorite song of mine. This kind of reminds me of Kendrick Lamar’s “Levitate.” However, I love the beginning of this song where it has pretty much a video game sound effect to it.”

== Usage in media ==
The song was featured in the official 2018 NBA Playoffs (Eastern Conference Finals) and the NBA Finals promotion for ESPN.

== Commercial performance ==
Upon its first week of release, "Motiv8" debuted at number 15 on the US Billboard Hot 100.

== Charts ==
Chart (2018)	Peak position
Australia (ARIA)	47
Canada Hot 100 (Billboard)	23
Ireland (IRMA)	37
New Zealand (Recorded Music NZ)	26
Portugal (AFP)	47
Sweden Heatseeker (Sverigetopplistan)	5
US Billboard Hot 100	15
US Hot R&B/Hip-Hop Songs (Billboard)	10

== Certifications ==
Region	Certification	Certified units/sales
Australia (ARIA)	Gold	35,000^{‡}
United States (RIAA)	Platinum	1,000,000^{‡}
^{‡} Sales+streaming figures based on certification alone.
