= Lewis Street =

EP by J. Cole
- Released: July 22, 2020
- Genre: Hip hop
- Length: 8:34
- Label: Dreamville; Roc Nation; Interscope
- Producer: J. Cole; T-Minus; JetsonMade

J. Cole chronology
KOD (2018)	Lewis Street (2020)	The Off-Season (2021)

Singles from Lewis Street
- 1. "The Climb Back" / "Lion King on Ice" Released: July 22, 2020

Lewis Street is the third extended play by American rapper J. Cole. It was released on July 22, 2020, by Dreamville Records and Roc Nation. It contains the dual singles "The Climb Back" and "Lion King on Ice". The two singles were to serve as the first two tracks from Cole's upcoming seventh album The Fall-Off. However, "The Climb Back" was later included on Cole's sixth album, The Off-Season.

== Background ==
On July 20, 2020, J. Cole released an article he wrote for The Players' Tribune, writing about goals for his forthcoming album The Fall-Off:

The fire that was once dying out has returned, and for that I'm grateful. On my career bucket list, there remain a few more items to check off before I give myself permission to enter whatever the next chapter of my life may be. However, as I approach the summit of this mountain, I still find myself staring at that other one in the distance, wondering if I can climb.

On July 21, Cole announced the release of two singles in a social media post, writing "First 2 songs from The Fall Off. Dropping tomorrow night 10pm. No date for the album yet, taking my time, still finishing."

== Track listing ==
Lewis Street track listing
No.	Title	Writer(s)	Producer(s)	Length
1.	"The Climb Back"	Jermaine Cole	J. Cole	5:04
2.	"Lion King on Ice"	Cole	J. Cole; T-Minus; JetsonMade	3:30
Total length:				8:34
