= Lion King on Ice =

2020 single by J. Cole

Single by J. Cole

from the EP Lewis Street
- Released: July 22, 2020
- Genre: Hip hop; trap
- Length: 3:30
- Label: Dreamville; Roc Nation
- Songwriter: Jermaine Cole
- Producers: J. Cole; T-Minus; JetsonMade

J. Cole singles chronology
"Snow on tha Bluff" (2020)	"Lion King on Ice" / "The Climb Back" (2020)	"Interlude" (2021)

"Lion King on Ice" is a song by American rapper J. Cole. It was released on July 22, 2020, together with another song, "The Climb Back", under the title Lewis Street. Produced by J. Cole, T-Minus and JetsonMade, the song is the 4th in the "Simba" series, following "Return of Simba" in 2011. The song finds Cole evolving from "Simba" into the "Lion King" while rapping about himself growing up and difficulties he faced to achieve fame, much like the previous installments, but in a darker tone, as well as his position in the rap game.

== Background ==
J. Cole announced the release of the songs via social media on July 21, 2020, along with its cover art, stating that they are the first two songs from The Fall Off. He also revealed that he was still "finishing" the album. In November 2019, Cole hinted that the album would be released in 2020. He also previously teased a project called The Off-Season.

== Composition ==
The song is rapped from the perspective of a younger J. Cole, who uses his alter ego "Young Simba", over a stripped back trap beat with high pitched vocal sampling. Cole discusses his come-up and the uncertainty he felt while trying to be successful, as well as the struggles and sacrifices he made along the way. He also talks about his childhood. In the first verse he raps about how hard-working and dedicated he needed to be to make it, and the obstacles he endured along the way. Towards the end of the song, Cole continues to reflect how those struggles led him to where he is today, and how far he has come.

In 2018, J. Cole settled his feud with Lil Pump through an interview, in which he warned Pump about what to do to keep up with his success as a rapper and not lose popularity. Fans noticed that in the song, Cole addressed Pump in particular with the lyrics, "Nigga dissed me / It was nonsense / I sat 'em down like his father / My nigga asked, 'Why you bother?' / We should've caught him and mobbed him / I said, 'We gotta move smarter' / Don't wanna be the reason for one more sad song / I tried to warn niggas they wouldn't last long / I hope that you see how they came and they want / They shots never hit but they made their attempts / May have a good year like their name on a blimp / But you know what it takes to be poppin' this long".

== Charts ==
Chart performance for "Lion King on Ice"
Chart (2020)	Peak position
Australia (ARIA)	87
Canada Hot 100 (Billboard)	59
Ireland (IRMA)	45
New Zealand Hot Singles (RMNZ)	5
UK Singles (Official Charts)	65
US Billboard Hot 100	51
US Hot R&B/Hip-Hop Songs (Billboard)	15
US Rhythmic Airplay (Billboard)	26
US Rolling Stone Top 100	31

== Certifications ==
Region	Certification	Certified units/sales
United States (RIAA)	Gold	500,000^{‡}
^{‡} Sales+streaming figures based on certification alone.
