= Album of the Year (Freestyle) =

Single by J. Cole
- Released: August 7, 2018
- Recorded: 2018
- Genre: Hardcore hip hop
- Length: 2:18
- Label: Dreamville; Roc Nation; Interscope
- Songwriters: Jermaine Cole; Nasir Jones; Michael Epps; Lamont Porter
- Producers: J. Cole; Ez Elpee

J. Cole singles chronology
"ATM" (2018)	"Album of the Year (Freestyle)" (2018)	"Tribe" (2018)

Music video
- "Album of the Year (Freestyle)" on YouTube

"Album of the Year (Freestyle)" is a song by American rapper J. Cole. It was released on August 7, 2018, through Dreamville Records, Roc Nation, and Interscope Records.

== Background ==
On August 7, 2018, Cole released "Album of the Year (Freestyle)" over the instrumental to Nas' and the Bravehearts' 2001 single, "Oochie Wally". The single was accompanied by a music video, which premiered on WorldStarHipHop. Cole also announced a new project titled, The Off Season, which Cole planned to release ahead of his next studio album, The Fall Off. The video's description reads: The Off Season coming soon... All roads lead to The Fall Off - Cole".

== Music video ==
The song's accompanying music video was released on August 7, 2018 as a WorldStarHipHop exclusive. The video was directed by Simon David, and was filmed in Raleigh, North Carolina.

== Charts ==
Chart (2018)	Peak position
Canada Hot 100 (Billboard)	84
US Billboard Hot 100	87
US Hot R&B/Hip-Hop Songs (Billboard)	44
