= The Climb Back =

2020 single by J. Cole

Single by J. Cole

from the album The Off-Season and the EP Lewis Street
- Released: July 22, 2020
- Length: 5:04
- Label: Dreamville; Roc Nation
- Songwriter: Jermaine Cole
- Producer: J. Cole

J. Cole singles chronology
| "Snow on tha Bluff" (2020) | "The Climb Back" / "Lion King on Ice" (2020) | "My Life" (2021) |

Audio video
- "The Climb Back" on YouTube

"The Climb Back" (stylized as "t h e . c l i m b . b a c k") is a song by American rapper J. Cole. It was released on July 22, 2020, together with another song, "Lion King on Ice", under the title Lewis Street. "The Climb Back", which was written and produced solely by J. Cole, sees him rapping about various topics, including life-changing moments, the effects of those moments, and his rediscovered love of rap music. The song received universal acclaim from critics.

The songs follow J. Cole's previous, political single, "Snow on tha Bluff", which was his first release of 2020. "The Climb Back" was later included on Cole's sixth studio album The Off-Season (2021).

== Background ==
J. Cole announced the release of the songs via social media on July 21, 2020, along with its cover art, stating that they are the first two songs from The Fall-Off. Cole also revealed that he was still "finishing" the album. In November 2019, Cole hinted that the album would be released in 2020. He also previously teased a project called The Off-Season.

== Composition ==
The song begins with a skit about how people are more focused on achieving fame than growth. It then sees J. Cole further introspecting on a variety of topics, over a soulful, dreamy, "bass knocking" instrumental, and a "sparkly" piano melody. Cole reflects on past incidents and disputes, with "violent thoughts", and addresses "the cyclical nature of working to get ahead, both in the rap game and in life", as noted by Rolling Stone's Althea Legaspi. Cole labels himself "The Chosen One", while rhyming about his newfound love for rap, and touches on traumatic moments in his life, including how gun violence ended the lives of his friends, coping with these deaths and, as a result, how he struggles to sleep because of it. He also takes aim at his competitors, issuing a warning to any "trash rappers, ass backwards, tryna go toe-to-toe". The chorus finds Cole talking about karma and how "everything comes full circle".

== Critical reception ==
Deeming it the better of the pair of the songs, The New York Times' Jon Caramanica praised J. Cole's lyricism: "'The Climb Back' is thick with clever metaphors not heard since the 1990s over a self-produced beat that's both agitated and exasperated. Cole is a charmingly patient rapper, imagistic, nimble — and very keen to display all of those skills. His metrics are internal, his references are outmoded, his approach is deliberate [...]" Erika Marie of HotNewHipHop said Cole asserts "lyrical dominance" on "The Climb Back", which Marie found to be a "smoother approach" than "Lion King on Ice". Billboard's Jason Lipshutz named the songs as one of the most essential releases of the week, opining that Cole "demonstrates the technical skill and unyielding personality that have made him a star" with the dual releases. Complex's Jessica McKinney noted how J. Cole "taps back into his mixtape days", and said the track suggests that Cole has a lot more to say when the album comes around. Brian Polson of Meaww called "The Climb Back", along with its counterpart "Lion King on Ice", "spectacular". Zac Geddies, writing for NYS Music said Cole delivers "bar after bar", switching his flow multiple times. Geddies concluded that although the song is missing a strong chorus, "the understated vocals Cole croons out serve towards the emotional potency of the track". Okayplayer's Torry Threadcraft simply stated Cole is "rapping, rapping".

== Charts ==
Chart performance for "The Climb Back"
| Chart (2020–2021) | Peak position |
|---|---|
| Australia (ARIA) | 39 |
| Canada Hot 100 (Billboard) | 32 |
| Global 200 (Billboard) | 26 |
| Ireland (IRMA) | 50 |
| New Zealand Hot Singles (RMNZ) | 8 |
| Portugal (AFP) | 46 |
| Sweden Heatseeker (Sverigetopplistan) | 17 |
| UK Singles (Official Charts) | 77 |
| UK Hip Hop/R&B (Official Charts) | 15 |
| US Billboard Hot 100 | 25 |
| US Hot R&B/Hip-Hop Songs (Billboard) | 15 |
| US Rolling Stone Top 100 | 26 |

== Certifications ==
| Region | Certification | Certified units/sales |
|---|---|---|
| Australia (ARIA) | Gold | 35,000^{‡} |
| New Zealand (RMNZ) | Gold | 15,000^{‡} |
| United States (RIAA) | Platinum | 1,000,000^{‡} |
^{‡} Sales+streaming figures based on certification alone.
