= Johnny P's Caddy =

2022 single by Benny the Butcher and J. Cole

Single by Benny the Butcher and J. Cole

from the album Tana Talk 4
- Released: January 28, 2022
- Genre: Hip hop: Boom bap
- Length: 3:45
- Label: Griselda; Empire
- Songwriters: Jeremie Pennick; Jermaine Cole; Alan Maman
- Producer: The Alchemist

Benny the Butcher singles chronology
"Mr. Pyrex Man" (2021)	"Johnny P's Caddy" (2022)	"John Woo Flick" (2022)

J. Cole singles chronology
"Poke It Out" (2021)	"Johnny P's Caddy" (2022)	"Scared Money" (2022)

Music video
- "Johnny P's Caddy" on YouTube

"Johnny P's Caddy" is a song by American rappers Benny the Butcher and J. Cole. It was released on January 28, 2022 as the lead single from the former's third studio album Tana Talk 4. The song was produced by The Alchemist, and is Benny the Butcher's first song to chart on the Billboard Hot 100. On April 13, 2023, the single was certified GOLD marking the first RIAA certification for both Benny & the Griselda Records label. The song is known as one of the most acknowledged features by J. Cole and is widely considered to be his best feature.

== Background ==
The title of the song refers to an old school Cadillac that Benny the Butcher's father owned when the rapper was an adolescent. According to Benny, his father would drive him and fellow rapper Westside Gunn around while playing music for them, which significantly developed his passion for music.

== Lyrics ==
Lyrically, the song finds the rappers reflecting on their rise to fame, encountering obstacles along the way, and their success and impact on the hip hop industry and their fans. Benny the Butcher begins his verse rapping about his past life of drug dealing and becoming a rapper (This ain't my story 'bout rags to riches, more 'bout how I mastered physics / In the game, I used to train like Rocky, catchin' chickens / I was nice, but they was right when they told me that rap a business / I had ten bands in my stash when I passed over half a million"). J. Cole criticizes rappers who lie about being involved in street life and dealing drugs, and ends his verse proclaiming he is the "best rapper alive".

== Music video ==
The music video sees Benny the Butcher and J. Cole in a house "bathed in natural light". Benny raps outside as he watches a man getting arrested, while Cole performs inside the house.

== Charts ==
Chart performance for "Johnny P's Caddy"
Chart (2022)	Peak position
Canada Hot 100 (Billboard)	84
Global 200 (Billboard)	139
South Africa Streaming (TOSAC)	42
US Billboard Hot 100	72
US Hot R&B/Hip-Hop Songs (Billboard)	22

== Certifications ==
Certifications for "Johnny P's Caddy"
Region	Certification	Certified units/sales
United States (RIAA)	Gold	500,000^{‡}
^{‡} Sales+streaming figures based on certification alone.
