= Photograph (J. Cole song) =

Song by J. Cole

from the album KOD
- Released: April 20, 2018
- Recorded: 2017
- Length: 3:38
- Label: Dreamville; Roc Nation; Interscope
- Songwriter(s): Jermaine Cole
- Producer(s): J. Cole

"Photograph" is a song by American rapper J. Cole, released on April 20, 2018 from his fifth studio album, KOD.

== Lyrical interpretation ==
Pitchfork said "Cole simplifies lust on "Photograph," where he again reminds us that his ideal woman is a holy Madonna who is sexy but never shows too much skin." Spin said it "renders lust as it plays out on social media when the object of affection is a complete stranger."

== Critical reception ==
Alexis Petridis of The Guardian said "there's something really haunting about Photograph, with its delicate two-note guitar sample and a chorus whose vocal appears to be slightly out of step with the beat."

== Charts ==
Chart (2018)	Peak position
Australia (ARIA)	41
Canada (Canadian Hot 100)	19
Ireland (IRMA)	36
New Zealand (Recorded Music NZ)	26
Portugal (AFP)	32
Sweden Heatseeker (Sverigetopplistan)	6
UK Singles (OCC)	30
US Billboard Hot 100	14
US Hot R&B/Hip-Hop Songs (Billboard)	9

== Certifications ==
Region	Certification	Certified units/sales
Australia (ARIA)	Gold	35,000^{‡}
United States (RIAA)	Platinum	1,000,000^{‡}
^{‡} Sales+streaming figures based on certification alone.
