= Poke It Out =

2021 single by Wale featuring J. Cole

Single by Wale featuring J. Cole

from the album Folarin II
- Released: September 30, 2021
- Genre: Hip hop
- Length: 3:03
- Label: Maybach; Warner
- Songwriters: Olubowale Akintimehin; Jermaine Cole
- Producer: Cool & Dre

Wale singles chronology
"Single & Happy" (2021)	"Poke It Out" (2021)	"Hopeless Romantic (Remix)" (2021)

J. Cole singles chronology
"Your Heart" (2021)	"Poke It Out" (2021)	"Johnny P's Caddy" (2022)

Music video
- "Poke It Out" on YouTube

"Poke It Out" is a song written and performed by American rapper Wale featuring fellow American rapper J. Cole. It was released on September 30, 2021, as the third single from Wale's seventh studio album Folarin II (2021). The song was produced by Cool & Dre and samples "Vivrant Thing" by Q-Tip.

== Composition and lyrics ==
Over the electric bass sample, Wale raps the chorus and first verse, about his relationship with women ("I just wanna see if you gon' lie or you gon' love me / I was gettin' broads way before I got the money, honey"). In the second verse, J. Cole celebrates his reunion with Wale ("Cole World and Folarin co-starrin' / We both flexin', Bo Jacksons, bogartin'"), also rapping about the attention he receives from women and being the "franchise player".

== Music video ==
The official music video was released alongside the song. In it, Wale drives a red Jeep with a group of women. A beach run scene from the video for "Vivrant Thing" is recreated, when Wale and the female models end up at a lakeside campsite, where the women play football and dance and Wale hosts a bonfire. J. Cole later appears, rapping in a pink lit room.

== Charts ==
=== Weekly charts ===
Weekly chart performance for "Poke It Out"
Chart (2021–2022)	Peak position
US Billboard Hot 100	73
US Hot R&B/Hip-Hop Songs (Billboard)	21
US Rhythmic Airplay (Billboard)	7

=== Year-end charts ===
2022 year-end chart performance for "Poke It Out"
Chart (2022)	Position
US Hot R&B/Hip-Hop Songs (Billboard)	88
US Rhythmic (Billboard)	34
