= 1985 (J. Cole song) =

Song by J. Cole

from the album KOD
- Released: April 20, 2018
- Recorded: 2018
- Genre: Hip hop
- Length: 3:10
- Label: Dreamville; Roc Nation; Interscope
- Songwriter: Jermaine Cole
- Producer: J. Cole

"1985", also referred to as "1985 (Intro to The Fall Off)", is a song by American rapper J. Cole, released on April 20, 2018, from his studio album KOD.

== Critical reception ==
Alexis Petridis of The Guardian said "KOD's best track may be its closer, 1985, which is billed as the intro of his seventh studio album The Fall Off. It delivers hip-hop's new generations of artists (by whom Cole is "unimpressed") a wise, warm but firm talking-to that switches from practical advice, warnings about the fleeting nature of fame and the inadvisability of jumping on trends to a stark and impressively incisive suggestion they should think hard about the nature of their appeal: "These white kids love that you don't give a fuck, 'cause that's exactly what's expected when your skin black... They wanna be black and think your song is how it feels"."

=== Reactions ===
In April 2017 Lil Pump teased a song titled "Fuck J. Cole" produced by Florida rapper Smokepurpp. Media outlets and rappers speculated that "1985" is a response to the rapper, while J. Cole said in a Vulture.com interview that "It's really a 'shoe fits' situation—several people can wear that shoe." The verse concludes as follows:

Lil Pump reacted to the song hours after the album's release via Instagram saying, "Wow, you get so much props. You dissed a 17 year old, lame ass jit." Later that day during a concert in Atlanta, Smokepurpp, along with his fans erupted in a chant of "Fuck J. Cole." According to Cole, the target of the song is more general. He said it takes aim at what he sees as the cartoon version of hip-hop, he explained: "If you exclude the top three rappers in the game, the most popping rappers all are exaggerated versions of black stereotypes. Extremely tatted up. Colorful hair. Flamboyant. Brand names. It's caricatures, and still the dominant representation of black people, on the most popular entertainment format for black people, period". On May 4, 2018, as Cole was performing at JMBLYA festival in Dallas, he performed "1985", cutting off the backing track so he could rap his verse a cappella. The crowd erupted in chants of "Fuck Lil Pump" and "Fuck 6ix9ine." Cole immediately shut down the chants telling the crowd, "Don't do that." Cole performed "1985" during his Rolling Loud Festival performance on May 11, 2018, in Miami. During the performance Lil Pump was seen dancing to the song near the stage.

On May 25, after Rolling Loud, J. Cole and Lil Pump sat down for an hour-long interview indicating that a supposed beef between the two is over. Cole asked Pump about his "Fuck J. Cole" comments in his music and social media. Pump responded by claiming he had seen his fans commenting it on social media and didn't know why. "But now I kinda get it", he said. "We make different types of music, so people, like... People just like doing that shit." He continued, "It wasn't even serious it was just a song and u dissing me... I fuck with your shit. It's hard".

Rapper Cordae released a response song in May 2018 titled "Old N*ggas", where he advocates unity among more traditional rappers and newer rappers.

== Chart performance ==
Upon its first week of release, "1985" debuted at number 20 on the US Billboard Hot 100.

== Charts ==
Chart (2018)	Peak position
Canada Hot 100 (Billboard)	32
Ireland (IRMA)	41
New Zealand Heatseekers (RMNZ)	2
Portugal (AFP)	50
Sweden Heatseeker (Sverigetopplistan)	12
US Billboard Hot 100	20
US Hot R&B/Hip-Hop Songs (Billboard)	14

== Certifications ==
Region	Certification	Certified units/sales
Australia (ARIA)	Gold	35,000^{‡}
United States (RIAA)	Platinum	1,000,000^{‡}
^{‡} Sales+streaming figures based on certification alone.
