= KOD (album) =

- Standard album cover. The text on the album cover reads, "This album is in no way intended to glorify addiction".

Studio album by J. Cole
- Released: April 20, 2018
- Recorded: 2017–2018
- Genre: Conscious hip-hop
- Length: 42:27
- Label: Dreamville; Roc Nation; Interscope
- Producer: J. Cole; BLVK; Mark Pelli; Ron Gilmore; T-Minus

J. Cole chronology
4 Your Eyez Only (2016)	KOD (2018)	Lewis Street (2020)

Singles from KOD
- 1. "KOD" Released: May 8, 2018; 2. "ATM" Released: July 31, 2018

KOD (an initialism for Kids on Drugs, King Overdosed and Kill Our Demons) is the fifth studio album by American rapper J. Cole. It was released on April 20, 2018, through Dreamville Records, Roc Nation and Interscope Records.

The majority of the album's production was handled by Cole himself, along with others such as T-Minus, Mark Pelli, BLVK and Ron Gilmore. The album incorporates elements of jazz rap and trap. Cole has stated that the production and rhyme schemes used throughout the album were inspired by SoundCloud rap. The album explores a variety of topics including drug abuse, addiction, depression, greed, African-American culture, and taxation in the United States.

The album was supported by two singles: "KOD" and "ATM", both of which debuted in the top 10 on the US Billboard Hot 100. In August 2018, Cole embarked on the KOD Tour to promote the album.

KOD received positive reviews from critics and debuted atop the US Billboard 200, selling 397,000 album-equivalent units in its first week (174,000 coming from pure sales), earning Cole his fifth consecutive number-one album in the country. It also broke several streaming records. The album has since been certified Platinum by the Recording Industry Association of America (RIAA). The album also debuted at number one in Australia, Canada, Ireland, and New Zealand. KOD appeared on several music publications' mid-year and year-end lists. HipHopDX, HotNewHipHop and Uproxx named it the best hip-hop album of 2018.

== Background and recording ==
In an interview with Vulture, Cole said that the seed for KOD was planted at rapper Kendrick Lamar's concert in Detroit for his Damn Tour in 2017. He said watching Lamar's performance reminded him of 2014 Forest Hills Drive. Cole further explained saying: "Kendrick's show gave me chills because I got to see what it was like to have a hit album performed, and it set off a desire, it was a recognition — like, oh, I’ll take that again. Like looking at a menu, I’ll have that again." The majority of the album was initially recorded over a span of two weeks while Cole was on the 4 Your Eyez Only Tour and while on vacation in Italy and Tanzania, Cole recorded three songs while on tour, and another six while on vacation. According to Cole, he went back to the drawing board to perfect the final three songs. The final version of the album took an additional 6 months. Before recording KOD, Cole was working on his seventh studio album, The Fall Off. He released The Off-Season in 2021, and The Fall Off in 2026.

== Artwork and title ==
Artwork as seen on back cover of KOD.

Cole revealed the album's cover art on April 18, 2018. The cover art was done by Detroit artist Kamau Haroon, known artistically as Sixmau. Cole discovered Sixmau through singer and producer Childish Major, for whom he was doing art. Sixmau told Vibe magazine: "I can't talk much about his vision. You're going to have to listen to the album. It all ties in together. It was definitely a collaboration. It was a marriage of art and music. He told me what direction he was going in and then he gave me freedom to portray it how I wanted."

The album's title carries three different meanings: Kids on Drugs, King OverDosed, and Kill Our Demons. On April 19, 2018, Cole released the album's trailer. In the trailer, Cole broke down the meaning of the album title, he explained:

If I turn on the TV right now, it's not going to be long before an advertisement pops up that says 'are you feeling down? Have you been having lonely thoughts?' And then they shove a pill in your face" the voice says of the Kids on Drugs title. The second meaning, King Overdose is representing me… the times that I was — and am — afflicted by the same methods of escape, whether it be alcohol, phone addiction, women… Lastly, Kill Our Demons represents breaking free of past trauma. That's the end goal, to face our shit, realize we have some shit going on inside—everybody, I realized everybody family is fucked up because nobody is fucking perfect. Whether you want to or not, you're going to fuck up your kids in some type of way, because you got fucked up in some type of way.. the plan is to fuck your kids up the least amount possible. The first response to any problem is to medicate. Kill Our Demons is like, finding that shit, whether it be from traumatic childhood experiences, whether it be from a lack of attention, confidence issues, insecurities—whatever it is, we gotta be honest with ourselves. Look in the mirror or look inside and ask ourselves questions, like what's causing me to run to this thing as an escape? And once I find the root of that, let me look it in its face and see what it really is.

== Composition ==
"Once an Addict"
A heartbreaking song where J. Cole revisits growing up experiencing his mother's alcoholism. He illustrates the helplessness of a child watching his mother succumb to drinking. The song touches on child abandonment due to parents suffering from addiction and conveys how it can alter loved ones.

KOD has been characterized as conscious hip-hop with elements of jazz rap and trap. Cole has stated that the production and rhyme schemes used throughout the album was inspired by SoundCloud rappers. He said: "If you listen to the flows and the patterns and the production, it's like... these dudes inspired that form, that's the form I took to get this message off on this album."

== Release and promotion ==
On April 16, 2018, Cole sparked speculation of a new album after he cleared his Instagram account and changed his social media profile pictures to a plain purple background. Later that day, Cole took to Twitter to announce a surprise event for fans at the Gramercy Theatre in New York City. The event was free of charge, on a first-come, first-served basis. The event turned out to be a surprise listening session for the album. Later that night, he took to Twitter again to announce the album. Cole held a second listening session in London the next day. On April 18, 2018, Cole revealed the track listing for KOD.

In order to promote the album, Cole announced the KOD Tour on May 8, 2018. The tour included 34 North American dates, starting in Miami on August 9 and concluded in Boston on October 10, 2018. Young Thug, Jaden Smith, EarthGang and Cole's alter ego kiLL edward served as supporting acts on the tour.

On May 16, 2018, Cole released a 94-minute interview with radio personality Angie Martinez. During the interview, Cole discussed a variety of topics including the album. The interview was conducted in Miami at producer Salaam Remi's house before Cole headlined the 2018 Rolling Loud Festival. The interview was Cole's first on camera interview since 2015. On May 25, 2018, Cole released another hour long interview with rapper Lil Pump where they asked each other questions. It was recorded at Cole's recording studio, the Sheltuh, in North Carolina. The song "1985" was allegedly aimed at Lil Pump.

Cole performed "Intro" and "Friends" at the 2018 BET Awards on June 24, 2018. Singer Daniel Caesar performed part of "Intro" and the chorus to "Friends". Rapper Wale was also part of the set. Writing for Billboard, Nerisha Penrose declared it the best performance of the night, writing: "Instead of opting for the bouncy standout cuts like “Motiv8” or “ATM” from his newest album KOD, Cole reached for the heartfelt song “Friends” for his captivating performance." The performance was Cole's first at the award show since 2013.

=== Singles ===
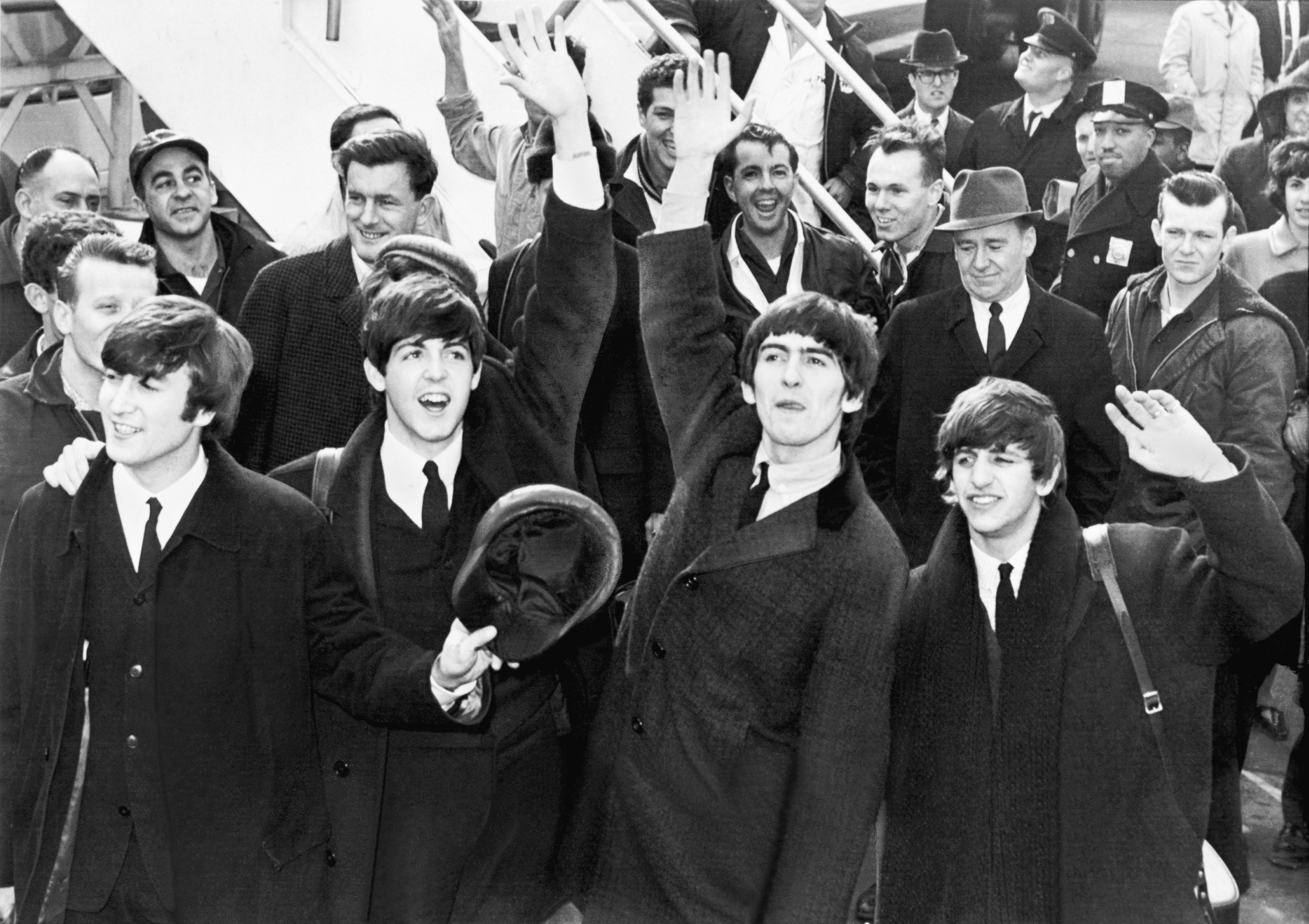
With the album's release, J. Cole tied with The Beatles for achieving six songs in the Top 20 on the U.S. Billboard Hot 100 chart.

"KOD" was serviced to American mainstream urban radio as the album's first single on May 8, 2018. The song broke Spotify opening day record. It was streamed 4.2 million times, a record Taylor Swift previously held for "Look What You Made Me Do" (2017). The song debuted at number 10 on the US Billboard Hot 100. "ATM" impacted US rhythmic contemporary radio on July 31, 2018, as the album's second single. The music video was released on April 20, 2018, upon release of the album. "ATM" debuted at number six on the US Billboard Hot 100. With the release of "ATM", Cole became the first musician to simultaneously debut three new songs inside the top 10 of the US Billboard Hot 100, with "ATM" (at 6), "Kevin's Heart" (8), and "KOD" (10). Cole managed pass the record high of nine simultaneous Top 40 hit songs in North America held by Cardi B, Drake, and Kendrick Lamar. He ties with The Beatles for having six positions in the top 20 on the Hot 100 chart, a record that the rock band had previously held for fifty-four years.

=== Other songs ===
The music video for the song, "Kevin's Heart", was released on April 24, 2018. The video features actor and comedian Kevin Hart. The song debuted at number eight on the US Billboard Hot 100. Producer DJ Premier released a remix of "1985", titled "DJ Premier 1966 Remix" on May 29, 2018.

== Critical reception ==
Professional ratings
Aggregate scores
Source	Rating
AnyDecentMusic?	6.3/10
Metacritic	73/100
Review scores
Source	Rating
AllMusic	3.5/5 stars
Consequence of Sound	B
Exclaim!	8/10
The Guardian	4/5 stars
NME	4/5 stars
Now	4/5
Pitchfork	6.3/10
PopMatters	6/10
Rolling Stone	3.5/5 stars
XXL	4/5

KOD received positive reviews from critics. On Metacritic, which assigns a normalized rating out of 100 to reviews from mainstream publications, the album received an average score of 73, based on 14 reviews, indicating "generally favorable reviews".

Alexis Petridis of The Guardian praised the album, calling Cole "the conscience of mainstream hip-hop". He continued saying: "The goofy, self-deprecating humour of his 2014 single "Wet Dreamz" and the warm contentment of "Foldin Clothes" are both conspicuous by their absence. Instead, we find Cole repeatedly raising a concerned eyebrow at drug use in the world of Xanax-fuelled rap and probing hip-hop's obsession with money. It's the kind of thing that could come off a little preachy but it doesn't here, largely because Cole is always quick to implicate himself." Writing for The Ringer, Justin Charity called the album "a rebuke to the druggy concerns of a younger generation of rappers." He commented further saying, "KOD is a curious treatise on how hip-hop might revise its principles in light of the genre's growing discomfort with the personal darkness that some very recent rap stars, proud addicts and abusers, have wrought." Trent Clark of HipHopDX praised the album, calling it "one of the most important rap albums ever". He wrote: "J. Cole has a gift in turning tears into teaching tools and KOD is a concise, leather-bound audiobook of invaluable life direction goals."

In a positive review, Lawrence Burney of Vice deemed the album Cole's "best effort yet", saying "yes, there are times when he seems a bit out of touch on KOD, but what translates most successfully here is compassion and concern, not contempt." Briana Younger, writing for Spin stated: "KOD is a stark reminder that some of life's most destructive elements don't always come with a warning label." Sam Moore of NME called the album "powerful". He said: "Cole has emerged this decade as one of the US' finest rappers. He's a confident lyricist with an ear for a hip-pop hook, a willingness to address difficult subjects and an ability to weave compelling stories through his music." Scott Glaysher of Now said "Cole doesn't sacrifice any inch of rhythm or melody while detailing his cautionary tales. It's clear he's mastered the art of hiding medicine in candy." Mitch Findlay of HotNewHipHop gave the album a 90% rating saying, "KOD is a trip worth taking". The album got an 85% audience rating based on over 400 user votes. In a mixed review, Jon Caramanica of The New York Times said the album "has the feel of a casual placeholder between bigger ideas--it has neither the grim purpose or intense emotional acuity of his 2016 LP 4 Your Eyez Only, nor the cohesion of the prior one, 2014 Forest Hills Drive [...] Mr. Cole is an empathetic rapper, but he can be a mean moralist, too." Former HipHopDX writer Justin Hunte called KOD 2018's most important album. He deemed it "a time-piece album for the year" saying, "KOD is my album of the year because it targets a generational crisis, and it's not afraid to take an audience to therapy precisely when it needs it most. Is there anyone else in hip-hop willing to sacrifice their cool points to play therapist? If not J. Cole, then who?"

=== Accolades ===
The music video for "ATM" received nominations in two categories at the 2018 MTV Video Music Awards, including Best Hip Hop Video and Best Art Direction. KOD was nominated for Album of the Year at the 2018 BET Hip Hop Awards. The album was nominated for Favorite Album at the 44th People's Choice Awards.

KOD has appeared on multiple mid-year and year-end lists in 2018.

Publication	List	Rank	Ref.
AllHipHop	AllHipHop's 15 Best Hip-Hop Albums Of 2018	4	
Ambrosia For Heads	Ambrosia For Heads' Top 15 Hip-Hop Albums Of 2018	—N/a	
Associated Press	AP's top 2018 albums	3	
Billboard	The 50 Best Albums of 2018 (So Far): Critics' Picks	—N/a	
Billboard	50 Best Albums of 2018: Critics' Picks	43	
Billboard	The 20 Best Hip-Hop Albums of 2018: Critics' Picks	11	
The Boston Globe	Julian Benbow's best albums of 2018	—N/a	
Capital XTRA	Capital XTRA's 20 Best Albums of 2018	15	
Complex	The Best Albums of 2018 (So Far)	2	
Complex	The Best Albums of 2018	3	
HipHopDX	The Top 10 Rap Albums Of 2018 (So Far)	2	
HipHopDX	The Best Rap Albums Of 2018	1	
HotNewHipHop	Top 25 Hip-Hop & R&B Albums of 2018 So Far	1	
HotNewHipHop	Top 30 Hottest Hip-Hop Albums of 2018	1	
Marie Claire	10 Best Albums of 2018 So Far	—N/a	
Marie Claire	The Best Albums of 2018	—N/a	
Medium	Top 15 Hip Hop Albums	1	
NME	The best albums of 2018 so far	17	
NME	NME's Albums Of The Year 2018	32	
NPR	The Best Rap Albums Of 2018	6	
Pan African Music	The 15 best rap albums of 2018	14	
Revolt TV	11 best rap albums of 2018	5	
Uproxx	20 Best Rap Albums of 2018 So Far	5	
Uproxx	20 Must-Hear Rap Albums From 2018	1	
Vibe	The 30 Best Albums Of 2018	10	
Vulture	The Best Albums of 2018 (So Far)	—N/a	
XXL	47 of the Best Hip-Hop Projects of 2018 (So Far)	—N/a	
XXL	50 of the Best Hip-Hop Projects of 2018	—N/a	
Yahoo! Entertainment	The best albums of 2018: Billy Johnson Jr.'s list	1	
Yardbarker	The 10 best hip-hop releases of 2018	—N/a	

== Commercial performance ==
In the United States, on the day of its release, KOD broke streaming records on both Spotify and Apple Music. The album achieved a total of 64.5 million streams on Apple Music, breaking the previous record for Views by Drake in 2016. The album achieved 36.7 million streams on Spotify. Following the release, the album was promoted on social media by numerous other artists including Snoop Dogg, Fabolous, Nas, The Game, and Diddy.

KOD subsequently debuted at number one on the US Billboard 200, earning 397,000 album-equivalent units, including 174,000 in pure sales, making it Cole's fifth number one album. At the time of its release, the album achieved the largest streaming week of 2018 (and third-largest ever), accumulating over 322.7 million streams, only behind Kendrick Lamar's Damn (340.6 million) and Drake's More Life (384.8 million). It registered the biggest week in 2018 for an album, surpassing Justin Timberlake's Man of the Woods (293,000 units), and the second largest sales week, behind Timberlake's. Cole also became the first musician to simultaneously debut three new songs inside the top 10 of the US Billboard Hot 100, with "ATM" (at 6), "Kevin's Heart" (8), and "KOD" (10). As a result of sales and streaming figures, he was the first artist to have a trio of tracks open inside the uppermost tier at the same time. The remainder of the album also debuted in the Hot 100. Cole managed to tie with the Beatles for having six positions in the top 20 on the Hot 100 chart, a record that the rock band had previously held for fifty-four years.

In its second week, the album fell to number three on the US Billboard 200, moving 105,000 album-equivalent units. In its third week, the album climbed to number two, moving 68,000 album-equivalent units. On May 14, 2018, KOD was certified Gold by the Recording Industry Association of America (RIAA) for sales of over 500,000 album-equivalent units in the US. On December 5, 2018, KOD was certified Platinum by the Recording Industry Association of America (RIAA) with one million album-equivalent units in the United States.

KOD was a commercial success internationally as well, debuting at number one in Australia, Canada, Ireland, and New Zealand. It peaked within the top ten on charts in Belgium, Denmark, Netherlands, Finland, Norway, Sweden, Switzerland, and the United Kingdom.

As of December 2018, KOD has sold over 273,000 recognized copies and over 1,131,000 album-equivalent units in the United States. KOD was ranked as the 14th most popular album of 2018 on the Billboard 200.

== Usage in media ==
Songs from the album were featured in the official 2018 NBA Playoffs and the NBA Finals promotion for ESPN. "ATM" appeared on the soundtrack to 2018 video game NBA Live 19.

== Track listing ==
Credits adapted from album's liner notes as cited on the official Dreamville website. All tracks are produced by J. Cole except where listed.

No.	Title	Writer(s)	Producer(s)	Length
1.	"Intro"	Jermaine Cole; Richard Clay; Carl Clay; Wayne Garfield		1:47
2.	"KOD"	Cole		3:11
3.	"Photograph"	Cole; Raymond Evans; Jay Livingston; Francis Hime		3:38
4.	"The Cut Off" (featuring Kill Edward)	Cole; Bill Withers; Takehiro Honda	Cole; BLVK	3:57
5.	"ATM"	Cole; Nicholas Brodszky; Sammy Cahn		3:36
6.	"Motiv8"	Cole; Roy Ayers; James Bedford; Lamont Porter; Sylvia Striplin; Christopher Wallace		2:13
7.	"Kevin's Heart"	Cole; Tyler Williams; Mark Pellizzer	T-Minus; Mark Pelli^{[a]}	3:20
8.	"Brackets"	Cole; Richard Pryor; Marilyn Bergman; Alan Bergman; Quincy Jones		5:15
9.	"Once an Addict (Interlude)"	Cole; Ron Gilmore; Michał Urbaniak	Cole; Gilmore^{[b]}	3:17
10.	"Friends" (featuring Kill Edward)	Cole; John Dankworth		4:17
11.	"Window Pain (Outro)"	Cole; Jorge Barreiro		4:46
12.	"1985 (Intro to The Fall Off)"	Cole		3:10
Total length:				42:27

Notes

- ^{^[a]} signifies an additional producer
- ^{^[b]} signifies an additional bassline producer
- Kill Edward, credited as a featured artist on "The Cut Off" and "Friends", is an alias of J. Cole, stylized as kiLL edward
- "ATM" is an abbreviation for "Addicted to Money"
- "Brackets" and "Friends" are stylized in all caps
- "Intro", "KOD", "ATM", "Once an Addict" and "Window Pain" feature background vocals by Jasmin "Charly" Charles
- "The Cut Off" features vocals by Kaye Foxx
- "Brackets" features vocals by Kill Edward and Kaye Foxx
- "Friends" and "Window Pain" feature background vocals by Kaye Foxx

Sample credits

- "Intro" contains excerpts from "Love from the Sun", as written by Richard Clay, Carl Clay and Wayne Garfield, and performed by Norman Connors.
- "Photograph" contains excerpts from "All Mine (Minha)" as written by Raymond Evans, Jay Livingston and Francis Hime and performed by Kenny Burrell, from the album Lotus Blossom.
- "The Cut Off" contains excerpts from "Kissing My Love", as written and performed by Bill Withers; and "Dark & Mellow", as written and performed by Takehiro Honda.
- "ATM" contains excerpts from "I'll Never Stop Loving You", as written by Nicholas Brodszky and Sammy Cahn, and performed by Ahmad Jamal.
- "Motiv8" contains excerpts from "Get Money", as written by Roy Ayers, James Bedford, Lamont Porter, Sylvia Striplin and Christopher Wallace, and performed by Junior M.A.F.I.A.
- "Brackets" contains excerpts from "Fame (Part Two)" as written by and performed by Richard Pryor; and elements from "Maybe Tomorrow" performed by Grant Green.
- "Once an Addict" contains excerpts from "A Day in the Park", as written and performed by Michał Urbaniak.
- "Friends" samples a portion of "Modesty Blaise Theme", as written by John Dankworth, and performed by John Dankworth and His Orchestra.
- "Window Pain (Outro)" contains samples from "Only Faith and Hope" performed by J.O.B. Orchestra.

== Personnel ==
Credits adapted from official liner notes.

Instrumentation

- Ron Gilmore – keyboard (track 3)
- Yang Tan – strings (track 5)
- Jasmin "Charly" Charles – strings (tracks 6, 7, 9, 10, 11)
- Margaux Whitney – strings (tracks 6, 7, 9, 10, 11)
- Elite – string arrangement (tracks 6, 7, 10, 11)
- Nate Jones – bass (track 9)

Technical

- Juro "Mez" Davis − recording, mixing (all tracks)
- Andrew Grossman – engineering assistance (tracks 3–12)
- Chris Athens – mastering (all tracks)
- Glenn Schick − mastering (all tracks)
- Sean Klein – engineering assistance (all tracks)
- Todd Hurt – engineering assistance (tracks 3–12), vocal recording (tracks 1, 2, 5, 12), string recording (track 7, 9, 10, 12)
- Yang Tan – engineering assistance (tracks 3–12), string recording (track 7, 9)

Additional personnel

- Jermaine Cole – executive producer, creative direction
- Ibrahim Hamad – executive producer, A&R, management
- Adam Roy Rodney – creative direction
- Kamau Haroon − illustrations
- Felton Brown – art direction (Dreamville)
- Scott Lazer – visual direction (Dreamville)
- Joe Nino-Hernes – lacquer cutting (Sterling Sound)

== Charts ==
=== Weekly charts ===
Chart (2018)	Peak position
Australian Albums (ARIA)	1
Austrian Albums (Ö3 Austria)	4
Belgian Albums (Ultratop Flanders)	2
Belgian Albums (Ultratop Wallonia)	30
Canadian Albums (Billboard)	1
Czech Albums (ČNS IFPI)	66
Danish Albums (Hitlisten)	4
Dutch Albums (Album Top 100)	2
Finnish Albums (Suomen virallinen lista)	9
German Albums (Offizielle Top 100)	16
Irish Albums (IRMA)	1
Italian Albums (FIMI)	37
New Zealand Albums (RMNZ)	1
Norwegian Albums (VG-lista)	2
Portuguese Albums (AFP)	24
Scottish Albums (Official Charts)	31
Slovak Albums (ČNS IFPI)	38
Swedish Albums (Sverigetopplistan)	5
Swiss Albums (Schweizer Hitparade)	6
UK Albums (Official Charts)	2
UK R&B Albums (Official Charts)	1
US Billboard 200	1
US Top R&B/Hip-Hop Albums (Billboard)	1

=== Year-end charts ===
Chart (2018)	Position
Australian Albums (ARIA)	63
Belgian Albums (Ultratop Flanders)	128
Canadian Albums (Billboard)	34
New Zealand Albums (RMNZ)	29
UK Albums (OCC)	93
US Billboard 200	14
US Top R&B/Hip-Hop Albums (Billboard)	10

Chart (2019)	Position
US Billboard 200	137
US Top R&B/Hip-Hop Albums (Billboard)	80

=== Decade-end charts ===
Chart (2010–2019)	Position
US Billboard 200	186

== Certifications ==
Region	Certification	Certified units/sales
Australia (ARIA)	Gold	35,000^{‡}
Canada (Music Canada)	Gold	40,000^{‡}
Denmark (IFPI Danmark)	Gold	10,000^{‡}
United Kingdom (BPI)	Gold	100,000^{‡}
United States (RIAA)	2× Platinum	2,000,000^{‡}
^{‡} Sales+streaming figures based on certification alone.

== Release history ==
List of release dates, showing region, format(s), label(s) and reference(s)
Region	Date	Format	Label	Ref.
Various	April 20, 2018	CD; digital download; streaming	Dreamville; Roc Nation; Interscope	
Various	April 23, 2018	Vinyl LP	Dreamville; Roc Nation; Interscope	

== See also ==
- 2018 in hip-hop
- List of number-one albums of 2018 (Australia)
- List of number-one albums of 2018 (Canada)
- List of number-one albums from the 2010s (New Zealand)
- List of UK R&B Albums Chart number ones of 2018
- List of Billboard 200 number-one albums of 2018
- List of Billboard R&B/hip-hop number-one albums of 2018
