= KOD (song) =

Single by J. Cole

from the album KOD
- Released: May 8, 2018
- Recorded: 2017
- Genre: Hip hop, trap
- Length: 3:11
- Label: Dreamville; Roc Nation; Interscope
- Songwriter: Jermaine Cole
- Producer: J. Cole

J. Cole singles chronology
"Neighbors" (2017)	"KOD" (2018)	"ATM" (2018)

"KOD" is a single by American rapper J. Cole, released on April 20, 2018, from his fifth studio album of the same name (2018), and was produced solely by himself. "KOD" was serviced to American mainstream urban radio, as the album's first single, on May 8, 2018.

== Background ==
Each of J. Cole's last two albums contained no features, and in the first verse of "KOD", he addresses the fans and media. "How come you won't get a few features?" he raps on KOD. "I think you should, how 'bout I don't? How 'bout you just get the fuck off my dick? How 'bout you listen and never forget? Only gon' say this one time, then I'll dip, niggas ain't worthy to be on my shit."

== Chart performance ==
Upon its first week of release, "KOD" debuted at number 10 on the US Billboard Hot 100. The song broke Spotify opening day record in the US, it was streamed 4.2 million times, Taylor Swift previously held the record for "Look What You Made Me Do" (2017).

In December 2018, Billboard ranked "KOD" as the 64th best song of the year.

== Charts ==
=== Weekly charts ===
Chart (2018)	Peak position
Australia (ARIA)	20
Austria (Ö3 Austria Top 40)	70
Belgium (Ultratip Bubbling Under Flanders)	24
Canada Hot 100 (Billboard)	12
Ireland (IRMA)	41
New Zealand (Recorded Music NZ)	10
Netherlands (Single Top 100)	69
Portugal (AFP)	10
Switzerland (Schweizer Hitparade)	42
UK Singles (OCC)	17
US Billboard Hot 100	10
US Hot R&B/Hip-Hop Songs (Billboard)	7
US Rhythmic Airplay (Billboard)	13

=== Year-end charts ===
Chart (2018)	Position
US Hot R&B/Hip-Hop Songs (Billboard)	68

== Certifications ==
Region	Certification	Certified units/sales
Australia (ARIA)	Platinum	70,000^{‡}
Brazil (Pro-Música Brasil)	Gold	20,000^{‡}
Canada (Music Canada)	Platinum	80,000^{‡}
Portugal (AFP)	Gold	5,000^{‡}
United Kingdom (BPI)	Gold	400,000^{‡}
United States (RIAA)	3× Platinum	3,000,000^{‡}
^{‡} Sales+streaming figures based on certification alone.
