= 4 Your Eyez Only World Tour =

2017 concert tour by J. Cole

- Tour by J. Cole
- Promotional poster for the tour
- Associated album: 4 Your Eyez Only
- Start date: June 1, 2017
- End date: December 9, 2017
- Legs: 3
- No. of shows: 40 in North America; 17 in Europe; 5 in Oceania; 62 in total
- Box office: $35,600,000

J. Cole concert chronology
- Dollar & A Dream Tour III: Friday Night Lights (2015); 4 Your Eyez Only World Tour (2017); KOD Tour (2018)

4 Your Eyez Only World Tour was a concert tour by American recording artist J. Cole, to support his fourth studio album 4 Your Eyez Only (2016). Dreamville artists J.I.D, Ari Lennox and Lute served as opening acts on the first leg of the tour. Rappers Anderson .Paak and Bas served as opening acts on the second leg of the tour, along with J.I.D and Ari Lennox. Dreamville artists J.I.D., Ari Lennox and EarthGang served as opening acts on the European leg of the tour.

== Background ==
To further promote his fourth studio album, 4 Your Eyez Only, Cole announced 4 Your Eyez Only World Tour on February 21, 2017. The tour was to include 62 dates across North America, Europe and Australia. The first 13 dates took place in smaller, intimate venues, while the remaining set of dates will take place in arenas. The tour began on June 1, 2017 in Columbia, South Carolina and concluded on December 9, 2017 in Perth, Australia.

A limited-edition 4 Your Eyez Only collectors' set was made available for pre-order on February 22, 2017 via Dreamville's website, with a shipping and release date of April 28, 2017. The bundle included 4 Your Eyez Only on vinyl, cassette and CD, or each could be purchased individually. The set also included limited artwork and 4 Your Eyez Only tour pre-sale access.

== Opening acts ==
- J.I.D (Leg 1, leg 2, European leg)
- Ari Lennox (Leg 1, leg 2, European leg)
- Lute (Leg 1)
- Anderson .Paak (Leg 2, selected dates)
- Bas (Leg 2)
- Cozz (performed with Bas during the opening act for majority of Leg 2)
- EarthGang (European leg)

== Set list ==
1. "For Whom the Bell Tolls"
2. "Immortal"
3. "Deja Vu"
4. "Ville Mentality"
5. "Change" (with Ari Lennox)
6. "Lights Please"
7. "Nobody's Perfect"
8. "Can't Get Enough"
9. "Forbidden Fruit"
10. "Neighbors"
11. "Foldin Clothes"
12. "She's Mine, Pt. 2"
13. "Love Yourz"
14. "Wet Dreamz"
15. "A Tale of 2 Citiez"
16. "G.O.M.D."
17. "Power Trip"
18. "No Role Modelz"
19. "4 Your Eyez Only"
Notes
- During the Las Vegas show, Cozz joined Ari Lennox during the opening act to perform "Backseat". Dennis Smith Jr., Statik Selektah, Joey Badass and DJ Mustard also attended the show.
- During the first Inglewood show, EarthGang joined J.I.D during the opening act, Russ also attended the show.
- During the second Toronto show, Cozz joined Bas during the opening act, WondaGurl and Michael B. Jordan also attended the show.

== Tour dates ==
List of concerts, showing date, city, venue, attendance, revenue
Date	City	Country	Venue	Attendance	Revenue
North American warm-up shows
June 1, 2017	Columbia	United States	The Senate	1,140 / 1,200	$40,215
June 2, 2017	Jacksonville	United States	Maverick's	1,060 / 1,060	$37,100
June 3, 2017	Tallahassee	United States	The Moon	1,961 / 2,000	$68,635
June 5, 2017	Jackson	United States	Hal and Mal's	890 / 900	$35,600
June 6, 2017	Birmingham	United States	Avondale	2,050 / 2,100	$71,750
June 7, 2017	Baton Rouge	United States	Varsity Theater	800 / 800	$32,000
June 9, 2017	Little Rock	United States	Metroplex	2,521 / 2,521	$88,235
June 11, 2017	Kansas City	United States	Arvest Bank Theatre at The Midland	2,787 / 2,787	$99,485
June 13, 2017	St. Louis	United States	The Pageant	2,000 / 2,000	$74,335
June 14, 2017	Memphis	United States	The New Daisy Theatre	1,033 / 1,100	$36,155
June 15, 2017	Louisville	United States	Mercury Ballroom	925 / 950	$32,625
June 17, 2017	Norfolk	United States	Norva Theatre	1,450 / 1,450	$50,750
June 18, 2017	Greensboro	United States	Cone Denim Entertainment Center	915 / 949	$33,985
North America
July 6, 2017	Phoenix	North America	Talking Stick Resort Arena	12,043 / 13,853	$862,208
July 8, 2017	Las Vegas	North America	MGM Grand Garden Arena	11,055 / 11,429	$917,931
July 9, 2017	Anaheim	North America	Honda Center	11,974 / 12,320	$972,488
July 11, 2017	Inglewood	North America	The Forum	26,220 / 28,134	$2,087,961
July 12, 2017	Inglewood	North America	The Forum	26,220 / 28,134	$2,087,961
July 14, 2017	Oakland	North America	Oracle Arena	26,137 / 27,032	$2,129,932
July 15, 2017	Oakland	North America	Oracle Arena	26,137 / 27,032	$2,129,932
July 17, 2017	Seattle	North America	KeyArena	—	—
July 19, 2017	Vancouver	Canada	Rogers Arena	13,196 / 13,196	$776,114
July 22, 2017	Saint Paul	United States	Xcel Energy Center	8,477 / 16,872	$578,814
July 24, 2017	Chicago	United States	United Center	12,143 / 14,439	$1,139,097
July 25, 2017	Auburn Hills	United States	The Palace of Auburn Hills	8,581 / 14,015	$678,450
July 28, 2017	Toronto	Canada	Air Canada Centre	26,071 / 26,071	$2,717,007
July 29, 2017	Toronto	Canada	Air Canada Centre	26,071 / 26,071	$2,717,007
August 1, 2017	Brooklyn	United States	Barclays Center	25,791 / 26,984	$2,163,542
August 2, 2017	Brooklyn	United States	Barclays Center	25,791 / 26,984	$2,163,542
August 4, 2017	Boston	United States	TD Garden	11,975 / 12,338	$1,166,353
August 5, 2017	Uniondale	United States	Nassau Veterans Memorial Coliseum	10,103 / 10,544	$787,157
August 6, 2017	Baltimore	United States	Royal Farms Arena	7,773 / 13,157	$564,774
August 8, 2017	Washington, D.C.	United States	Capital One Arena	11,572 / 15,211	$956,912
August 9, 2017	Charlotte	United States	Spectrum Center	11,686 / 15,297	$734,562
August 11, 2017	Duluth	United States	Infinite Energy Arena	10,058 / 10,533	$765,227
August 14, 2017	Miami	United States	American Airlines Arena	11,990 / 12,330	$991,465
August 16, 2017	Orlando	United States	Amway Center	9,363 / 10,498	$750,411
August 18, 2017	Houston	United States	Toyota Center	10,585 / 11,050	$909,708
August 19, 2017	Austin	United States	Frank Erwin Center	11,436 / 13,511	$1,056,319
August 20, 2017	Dallas	United States	American Airlines Center	12,880 / 13,579	$983,628
Europe
September 29, 2017	Copenhagen	Denmark	Tap1	—	—
September 30, 2017	Oslo	Norway	Oslo Spektrum	—	—
October 1, 2017	Stockholm	Sweden	Annexet	—	—
October 3, 2017	Cologne	Germany	Palladium	—	—
October 5, 2017	Amsterdam	Netherlands	Ziggo Dome	—	—
October 6, 2017	Berlin	Germany	Columbiahalle	—	—
October 7, 2017	Offenbach	Germany	Stadthalle Offenbach	—	—
October 9, 2017	Zürich	Switzerland	Samsung Hall	—	—
October 10, 2017	Paris	France	Le Zénith Paris - La Villette	—	—
October 12, 2017	Nottingham	England	Motorpoint Arena Nottingham	—	—
October 14, 2017	Birmingham	England	Barclaycard Arena	13,249 / 15,305	$884,823
October 15, 2017	London	England	The O_{2} Arena	—	—
October 16, 2017	London	England	The O_{2} Arena	—	—
October 18, 2017	Dublin	Ireland	3Arena	—	—
October 20, 2017	Cardiff	Wales	Motorpoint Arena Cardiff	—	—
October 21, 2017	Manchester	England	Manchester Arena	10,228 / 11,379	$675,651
October 22, 2017	Leeds	England	First Direct Arena	5,952 / 7,093	$370,301
Oceania
December 1, 2017	Auckland	New Zealand	Spark Arena	—	—
December 2, 2017	Brisbane	Australia	Riverstage	—	—
December 4, 2017	Sydney	Australia	Hordern Pavilion	10,935 / 10,935	$829,765
December 5, 2017	Sydney	Australia	Hordern Pavilion	10,935 / 10,935	$829,765
December 6, 2017	Melbourne	Australia	Margaret Court Arena	6,350 / 6,350	$521,250
December 9, 2017	Perth	Australia	HBF Stadium	4,796 / 5,037	$294,892
Total				372,151 / 418,309 (88.97%)	$28,967,612

Cancellations and rescheduled shows

July 18, 2017	Vancouver, Canada	Rogers Arena	Rescheduled to July 19, 2017
July 21, 2017	Saint Paul, Minnesota	Xcel Energy Center	Rescheduled to July 22, 2017
July 23, 2017	Auburn Hills, Michigan	The Palace of Auburn Hills	Rescheduled to July 25, 2017
July 25, 2017	Chicago, Illinois	United Center	Cancelled
