= For Whom the Bell Tolls (disambiguation) =

For Whom the Bell Tolls is a 1940 novel by Ernest Hemingway.

For Whom the Bell Tolls may also refer to:

- "for whom the bell tolls", a line by John Donne from his 1624 work Devotions upon Emergent Occasions; the source for Hemingway's title and later uses

== Music ==
- "For Whom the Bell Tolls" (Bee Gees song)
- "For Whom the Bell Tolls" (J. Cole song)
- "For Whom the Bell Tolls" (Metallica song)
- "For Whom the Bells Toll", a song by Fad Gadget
- "For Whom the Bell Tolls", a song by London from Don't Cry Wolf
- "For Whom the Bell Tolls", a song by Sabaton from Heroes
- "For Whom the Bell Tolls", a song by Saxon from Destiny
- "For Whom the Bell Tolls", a song by W.A.S.P.

== Television ==
- For Whom the Bell Tolls (TV series), a BBC television adaptation of Hemingway's novel
- For Whom the Bell Tolls (Playhouse 90), a 1959 adaptation of the Hemingway novel on Playhouse 90
- "For Whom the Bell Tolls" (Pretty Little Liars), an episode of Pretty Little Liars
- "For Whom the Bell Tolls" (The Vampire Diaries), an episode of The Vampire Diaries
- "For Whom the Bell Tolls", an episode of Andromeda
- "For Whom the Bell Tolls", an episode of Married... with Children
- "For Whom the Bells Toll", an episode of The Wedding Bells

== Other uses ==
- For Whom the Bell Tolls (film), a 1943 film based on Hemingway's novel
- For Whom the Bell Tolls (painting), a 1942 painting by Jean Bellette
- For Whom the Bell Tolls, a volume of the manga One Piece
- Kaeru no Tame ni Kane wa Naru (known in English as The Frog For Whom the Bell Tolls), a 1992 video game for the Game Boy

== See also ==
- "For Whom the Pig Oinks", an episode of Disenchantment
- Dog Man: For Whom the Ball Rolls, a book in the Dog Man graphic novel series
