= High for Hours =

Single by J. Cole
- Released: January 18, 2017
- Recorded: 2015
- Genre: Political hip hop; jazz rap
- Length: 4:11
- Label: Dreamville; Roc Nation; Interscope
- Songwriter(s): Jermaine Cole
- Producer(s): Elite; Cam O'bi

J. Cole singles chronology
"Deja Vu" (2017)	"High for Hours" (2017)	"Neighbors" (2017)

"High for Hours" is a song by American rapper J. Cole. The song was released as a single on January 18, 2017. It was produced by Elite, with co-production from Cam O'bi. The song was considered for Cole's fourth studio album, 4 Your Eyez Only, but was not included. It was uploaded to Cole's SoundCloud page on Martin Luther King Day, January 16, 2017, and has over 11 million plays on SoundCloud as of October 2018. It treats themes including oppression, revolution, and a meeting with Barack Obama.

== Background ==
Producer Elite spoke about the song in an interview with DJBooth saying:

That one, we were on the Forest Hills Drive tour. Me and Cam [O'bi]—he's amazing, he's done a lot of stuff for Chance The Rapper and Noname—were on the tour bus making beats. Cole was in his hotel room, he texted me like, 'I need a beat.' He was writing to some instrumental, I forgot what it was but it was a song that was already out. He was like, 'I need a beat in this tempo.'

So me and Cam started coming up with stuff, working on drums and basslines, just trying to achieve a similar feel to what he was describing to us. We hadn't heard the verses, though. Maybe like an hour later, he came on the bus and heard what we were doing, gave us a little guidance as far as what to change. He actually had five verses to that song—he was talking about similar stuff—but we all decided like, 'alright, maybe you don't need these two, I think people get the point' [laughs]. Once he gets in the zone, he keeps going, that's the thing.

That was a song that had been sitting around for a while. It was considered for the album but it didn't fit the narrative, so we held off on it and decided to throw it out there before Obama left office, so it still kinda had some relevancy.

== Chart performance ==
Chart (2017)	Peak position
New Zealand Heatseekers (RMNZ)	5
US Bubbling Under Hot 100 Singles (Billboard)	22
