= Neighbors (J. Cole song) =

2017 single by J.Cole

Single by J. Cole

from the album 4 Your Eyez Only
- Released: April 25, 2017
- Recorded: 2016
- Genre: Conscious hip hop
- Length: 3:36
- Label: Dreamville; Roc Nation; Interscope
- Songwriter: Jermaine Cole
- Producer: J. Cole

J. Cole singles chronology
"High for Hours" (2017)	"Neighbors" (2017)	"KOD" (2018)

"Neighbors" is a song by American rapper J. Cole, released on December 9, 2016, recorded for his fourth studio album, 4 Your Eyez Only. It was released on April 25, 2017, as the second single off the album.

== Background ==
The song was recorded at the Sheltuh in North Carolina and Electric Lady Studios, and was produced and written by J. Cole himself. During an interview with Complex on December 9, 2016, Dreamville in-house producer, Elite explained the incident which occurred a few months prior that inspired the story in the track, "Neighbors", saying,

Basically Cole rented out a house in North Carolina. It’s not for him; it’s like a safe haven/creative workspace for all the Dreamville artists and producers. We call it the Sheltuh, and a lot of the album was recorded there. It’s basically a studio in a basement, in the woods. It’s also in the suburbs of a pretty wealthy neighborhood in North Carolina. So you have, predominantly, African-Americans coming in and out of this house. Ubers coming, and every once in awhile you’ll see a group of us outside on the porch smoking weed. So the neighbors started getting real paranoid. Apparently what happened was, we were all in Austin, Texas, for SXSW; thankfully no one was in the house when this went down. One of the neighbors told the police we were growing weed or selling drugs out of this house. And there was a huge investigation, like a million-dollar investigation. They flew helicopters over, sent an entire SWAT team armed with weapons, broke down the door and searched the whole house. Thankfully nobody was in the house. Our engineer Juro “Mez” Davis had just stepped out for lunch and he came back and saw the SWAT team busting down the door. They go downstairs and all they see is a studio, and obviously they felt stupid. It’s just crazy ironic because out of anybody, they picked the wrong person. J. Cole is the last person to do anything like that. He’s out here doing extremely positive things for the community and for young artists. Because of obvious racism from the neighbors, the police were called and a raid took place.

The song's instrumental was derived from a slowed-down, reversed sample of Cole's 2013 single, "Forbidden Fruit" which features Kendrick Lamar. "Forbidden Fruit" contains a sample of the song "Mystic Brew" by American Jazz musician Ronnie Foster. Cole revealed this during shows on his 4 Your Eyez Only World Tour, performing "Forbidden Fruit", then having the instrumental played in reverse as he transitioned into a performance of "Neighbors".

== Chart performance ==
Upon its first week of release, "Neighbors" debuted at number 13 on the US Billboard Hot 100 and at number 8 on the US Hot R&B/Hip-Hop Songs chart.

== Music video ==
The music video of the song was released on May 1, 2017. Cole used the footage of the incident from the closed-circuit television of his house as the video. The video only plays the first verse of the song.

== Charts ==
=== Weekly charts ===
Chart (2016–2017)	Peak position
Canada Hot 100 (Billboard)	17
Switzerland (Schweizer Hitparade)	96
UK Singles (OCC)	54
US Billboard Hot 100	13
US Hot R&B/Hip-Hop Songs (Billboard)	8
US Rhythmic Airplay (Billboard)	33

=== Year-end charts ===
Chart (2017)	Position
US Hot R&B/Hip-Hop Songs (Billboard)	90

== Certifications ==
Region	Certification	Certified units/sales
Australia (ARIA)	2× Platinum	140,000^{‡}
Denmark (IFPI Danmark)	Gold	45,000^{‡}
Portugal (AFP)	Gold	5,000^{‡}
United Kingdom (BPI)	Gold	400,000^{‡}
United States (RIAA)	4× Platinum	4,000,000^{‡}
^{‡} Sales+streaming figures based on certification alone.
