= False Prophets (song) =

2016 single by J. Cole

Single by J. Cole
- Released: December 5, 2016
- Genre: Conscious hip hop
- Length: 3:57
- Label: Dreamville; Roc Nation
- Songwriter: Jermaine Cole
- Producer: Freddie Joachim

J. Cole singles chronology
"Everybody Dies" (2016)	"False Prophets" (2016)	"Deja Vu" (2016)

Music video
- "False Prophets" on YouTube

"False Prophets" is a single by American rapper J. Cole, released on December 5, 2016 along with his single "Everybody Dies". The two songs were previewed in the documentary Eyez.

== Background ==
Originally, "False Prophets" was included on Cole's fourth studio album 4 Your Eyez Only. According to J. Cole's manager and producer Ibrahim "Ib" Hamad, the song did not "fit the storyline" of the album and was not a "real representation" of it. In 2018, Cole revealed that "False Prophets" was supposed to appear on his upcoming sixth studio album, The Fall Off, which was scheduled for release in 2020.

The instrumental of "False Prophets" was previously used by Joey Badass on his song "Waves". According to Badass, he gave J. Cole "his blessing" after Cole reached out and played the song for him. The instrumental was later used again by Mad Squablz for his song "Find My Way".

== Controversy ==
After the release of the 4 Your Eyez Only documentary, which played a snippet of "False Prophets", the disses in the song were quickly noticed. Though J. Cole did not mention any names on the track, there was guessing that the first verse contained direct shots towards Kanye West, because of lyrics about one altering public perception by the media and fans; as well as his recent hospitalization. Other lyrics had references to rappers who use ghostwriters and those who "hear some new style bubblin' up, then they bite the shit". People assumed that this particularly alluded to Drake. In the second verse, J. Cole raps about a "bitter" rapper who is concerned too much about fame and acclaim to enjoy his own blessings. It was postulated that Cole was aiming at Wale, who went on a Twitter rant earlier that year rallying against critics for his inclusion on President Barack Obama's summer playlist. The lyrical content in the song sparked a large debate on Twitter, with some believing that Cole was dissing West, Drake and Wale, while others suggested that he had been addressing the rap game in general.

=== Responses ===
Roughly 24 hours after the release of Eyez, Wale released a song called "Groundhog Day". He directly addressed "False Prophets" and referenced J. Cole's song "Crooked Smile" as well. Furthermore, he made mention of him and Cole touring together as opening acts during Jay-Z's Blueprint 3 Tour in 2009. Later that day, the two rappers were spotted hanging out together at a North Carolina State University basketball game.

In May 2019, a snippet of an alternate version of "What Would Meek Do?" by Pusha T featuring Kanye West was leaked. West appeared to have responded to Cole with the verse, "I'm too complex for ComplexCon / You heard Cole on that song, he was tryna hate". In the final version of the song, the lines were replaced as: "Am I too complex for ComplexCon? / Everything Ye say cause a new debate".

== Charts ==
Chart (2016)	Peak position
Canada Hot 100 (Billboard)	81
US Billboard Hot 100	54
US Hot R&B/Hip-Hop Songs (Billboard)	27
US Hot Rap Songs (Billboard)	21

== Certifications ==
Region	Certification	Certified units/sales
United States (RIAA)	Gold	500,000^{‡}
^{‡} Sales+streaming figures based on certification alone.
