= Everybody Dies (song) =

2016 single by J. Cole

Single by J. Cole
- Released: December 5, 2016
- Genre: Hip hop
- Length: 2:41
- Label: Dreamville; Roc Nation
- Songwriter: Jermaine Cole
- Producer: Cole

J. Cole singles chronology
"Love Yourz" (2016)	"Everybody Dies" (2016)	"False Prophets" (2016)

Music video
- "Everybody Dies" on YouTube

"Everybody Dies" is a single by American rapper J. Cole, released on December 5, 2016, along with his single "False Prophets". The two songs were previously previewed on the documentary Eyez.

== Background ==
"Everybody Dies" was originally included on J. Cole's fourth studio album 4 Your Eyez Only. It was later omitted due to the song not fitting the album's concept. In 2018, Cole revealed that the song was supposed to be on the tracklist of his upcoming sixth studio album The Fall Off.

The song samples "Me Against the World" by 2Pac featuring Dramacydal, "Inside My Love" by Minnie Riperton, and "Theme From the Planets" by Dexter Wansel.

== Controversy ==
J. Cole took aim at rappers using "Lil" in their stage names on the track, specifically with the following lines: "Especially the amateur eight-week rappers, Lil' whatever / Just another short bus rapper." Most assumed that this was directed at Lil Yachty and Lil Uzi Vert.

=== Responses ===
During an interview with Los Angeles' radio station Power 106, Lil Yachty responded by saying: "I don't listen to J. Cole [but] I definitely listened to it [and] people said he was talking about me. He said 'Lil.' I'm not little. My name has 'Lil' in it but there's a lot of 'Lil' rappers. [It's] either me or Uzi. Honestly, I don't give a fuck." He also said that Cole's dissing may have been triggered by Yachty's early messages on Twitter trolling J. Cole, most notably "Fuck J. Cole".

Lil Uzi Vert acknowledged the track on Twitter, responding: "Heard some beautiful shit today @JColeNC 🔥💯. 😈®️".

== Charts ==
Chart (2016)	Peak position
Canada Hot 100 (Billboard)	93
US Billboard Hot 100	57
US Hot R&B/Hip-Hop Songs (Billboard)	29
US Hot Rap Songs (Billboard)	23

== Certifications ==
Region	Certification	Certified units/sales
United States (RIAA)	Gold	500,000^{‡}
^{‡} Sales+streaming figures based on certification alone.
