= 4 Your Eyez Only =

Studio album by J. Cole
- Released: December 9, 2016
- Recorded: 2014 ("Deja Vu"); 2015–2016
- Studios: Electric Lady, New York City; The Sheltuh, Raleigh, North Carolina
- Genres: Conscious hip hop; jazz rap
- Length: 44:32
- Labels: Dreamville; Roc Nation; Interscope
- Producers: J. Cole; Elite; BLVK; Boi-1da; Cardiak; Chargaux; Childish Major; Deputy; Elijah Scarlett; Frank Dukes; Ron Gilmore; Steve Lacy; Velous; Vinylz

J. Cole chronology
| Forest Hills Drive: Live (2016) | 4 Your Eyez Only (2016) | KOD (2018) |

Singles from 4 Your Eyez Only
- 1. "Deja Vu" Released: January 10, 2017; 2. "Neighbors" Released: April 25, 2017

Vinyl cover

4 Your Eyez Only is the fourth studio album by American rapper J. Cole. It was released on December 9, 2016, by Dreamville Records, Roc Nation and Interscope Records. The album was Cole's first release with Interscope—his previous albums were released by Columbia Records. 4 Your Eyez Only was released exactly two years after Cole's previous studio album, 2014 Forest Hills Drive.

Most of these recordings took place from 2015 to 2016, while the production on the album was primarily handled by Cole himself, alongside several other record producers such as Vinylz, Boi-1da, Cardiak, Ron Gilmore, Frank Dukes, Chargaux and Elite, among others. The album explores a variety of topics concerning the African American community including mass incarceration, racial discrimination, gang violence and depression. The two-part suite “She’s Mine” dives deeper into Cole's emotions and provides the album with another perspective: hope. The album also touches on other topics such as love and fatherhood.

The album was supported by two singles: "Deja Vu," and "Neighbors". All 10 songs from 4 Your Eyez Only debuted in the top 40 of the US Billboard Hot 100. Cole achieved twelve simultaneous Hot 100 entries in a single week. Promoting the release, Cole released a one-hour documentary (by the same name) on April 15, 2017, on HBO, featuring music from the album. In June 2017, Cole embarked on the 4 Your Eyez Only World Tour, to promote the album.

4 Your Eyez Only debuted at number one on the US Billboard 200, selling 363,000 copies in its first week (492,000 with additional album-equivalent units), earning Cole his fourth consecutive number-one album in the country. It had the third-largest weekly sales for an album in 2016. The album also debuted at number one on Billboard's Canadian Albums Chart. The reception for 4 Your Eyez Only was generally positive, with most critics praising the songwriting, and some calling it Cole's most mature album to date. It appeared on several music publications' year-end lists. On January 12, 2017, 4 Your Eyez Only was certified Gold by the Recording Industry Association of America, and was certified Platinum on April 7, 2017.

== Background ==
On July 29, 2016, DJ Khaled released his ninth album, Major Key, the fifth track of which, titled "Jermaine's Interlude", features Cole. During his feature on that track, Cole declares, "Said all I could say, now I play with thoughts of retirement"—a line that had fans of Cole's wondering about the future of his music career. In October 2016, while performing at a live concert, Cole said that it would be his "last show for a very long time." However, on December 1, with no announcement from Cole himself, a pre-order for his fourth studio album, titled 4 Your Eyez Only was made available on iTunes Store, with a release date for December 9, 2016. Dreamville Records revealed 4 Your Eyez Only official track listing on December 6 through their Twitter account. According to a Twitter rep, there were 2.7 million tweets mentioning J. Cole or 4 Your Eyez Only between December 7 to 19, 2016. In January 2017, in an interview with The Huffington Post, Cole's manager and Dreamville president, Ibrahim Hamad revealed not even the label knew they would be releasing 4 Your Eyez Only until very late. By the time it actually came out only seven people had heard the album in its entirety.

== Album artwork ==
The photo that forms the basis of the cover art was shot by Anthony "Supreme" Thompson, who is a photographer and a fan of Cole's. The photo was shot in an Atlanta neighborhood in September 2016. Thompson explained on Instagram:

This Atlanta neighborhood was just going crazy! People were running out of their house to take a photo of Cole and ask him questions but, there was something to me about this boy and how he kept looking at Cole as he walked around his neighborhood. I can see in his eyes how much this experience is slowly changing his life forever! The young boy's face just stood out to me to capture. I saw in his eyes he knew nothing about J. Cole, but was somewhat amazed how everyone was reacting to him. The boy even asked Cole several times who he was. But, he couldn't understand what was going on in his world. Cole and I spent hours one night looking for photos for his album cover but nothing seemed to stand out. Then a few days passed and I finally found this photo that I felt represented the cover the most to me to pitch to him.

The cover art was revealed when the album was made available for pre-order on iTunes. XXL named it one of the best cover arts of 2016.

== Recording and production ==
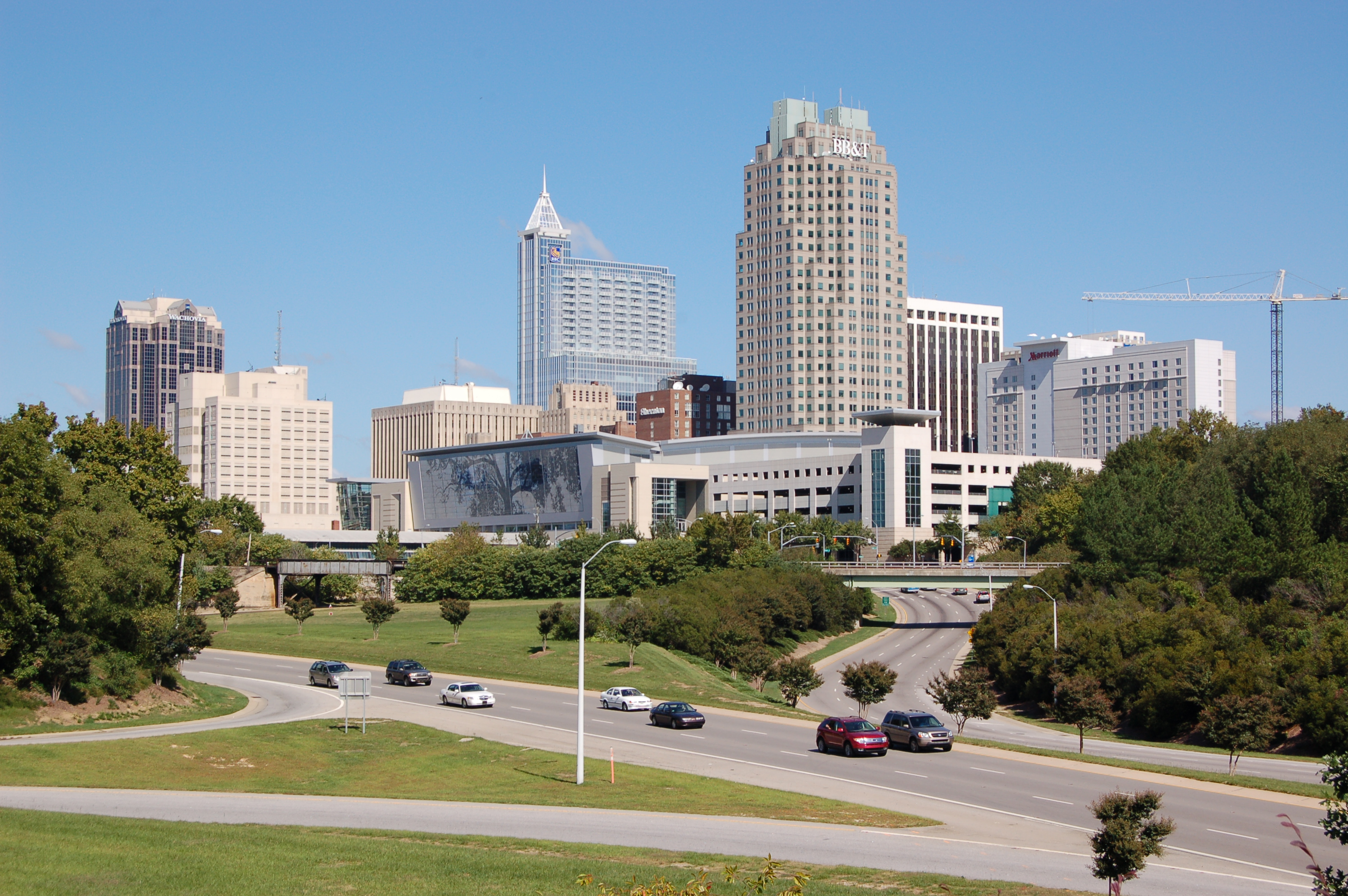
The majority of the album was recorded in Raleigh, North Carolina (pictured).

The majority of the album was recorded at a home and recording studio in North Carolina that Cole nicknamed the Sheltuh. Some sessions also took place at Electric Lady Studios in New York City, over the summer of 2016. On March 18, 2016, an incident occurred at the Sheltuh that inspired the making of the track, "Neighbors", Dreamville in-house producer, Elite explained the situation in an interview with Complex, saying:

Basically Cole rented out a house in North Carolina. It's not for him; it's like a safe haven/creative workspace for all the Dreamville artists and producers. We call it the Sheltuh, and a lot of the album was recorded there.. It's basically a studio in a basement, in the woods. It's also in the suburbs of a pretty wealthy neighborhood in North Carolina. So you have, predominately, African-Americans coming in and out of this house. Ubers coming, and every once in awhile you'll see a group of us outside on the porch smoking weed. So the neighbors started getting real paranoid. Apparently what happened was, we were all in Austin, Texas, for SXSW; thankfully no one was in the house when this went down. One of the neighbors told the police we were growing weed or selling drugs out of this house. And there was a huge investigation, like a million-dollar investigation. They flew helicopters over, sent an entire SWAT team armed with weapons, broke down the door and searched the whole house. Thankfully nobody was in the house. Our engineer Juro "Mez" Davis had just stepped out for lunch and he came back and saw the SWAT team busting down the door. They go downstairs and all they see is a studio, and obviously they felt stupid. It's just crazy ironic because out of anybody, they picked the wrong person. J. Cole is the last person to do anything like that. He's out here doing extremely positive things for the community and for young artists. Because of obvious racism from the neighbors, the police were called and a raid took place.

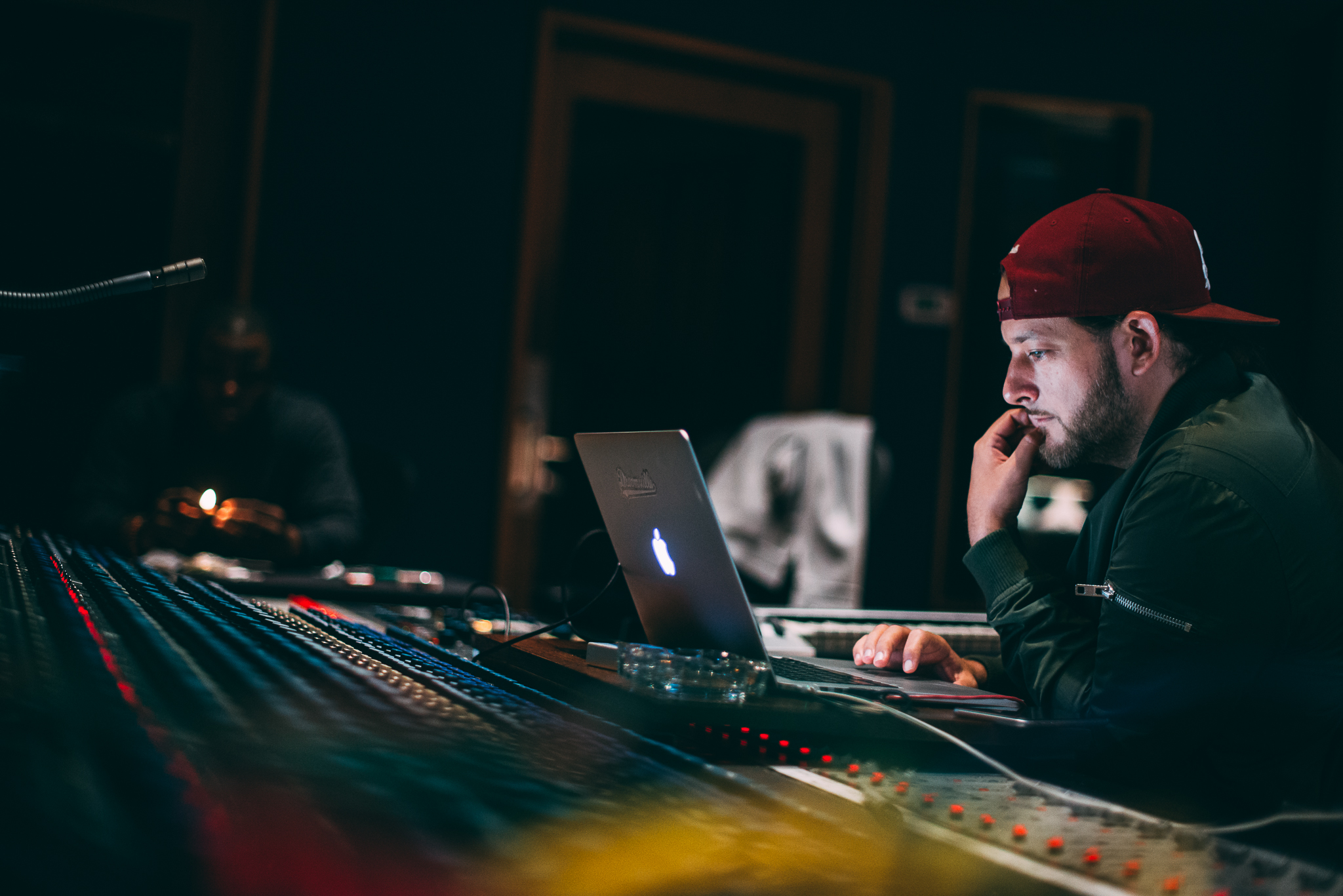
Producer Elite provided production on the album, and also served as co-executive producer of the album.

We've worked on albums before and a lot of times we would get a song and everything was sown up, and basically they're just like, "Can you just sprinkle a little extra whatever on it?" For this particular album, to be given the opportunity to work with people who were so kind and so open and so willing to let us do our thing and let us contribute vocals on the track and have this creative freedom is kind of unprecedented for us, and it gave us the opportunity to get our first production credit and really be fully integrated into the sound of the project.

— In an interview with XXL in December 2016, Margaux of duo Chargaux spoke on the most surprising part about working on 4 Your Eyez Only.

According to Elite the title track "4 Your Eyez Only" started the entire concept of the album, he said:

That was a beat he found on SoundCloud by a producer who was pretty unknown [BLVK] and just blacked out for like 24 hours. He wrote and wrote and wrote to that loop. That was one song he expressed to me like, 'we got to make this worthy of an album.' You can't just have an eight-minute song.

The track "Ville Mentality" features a spoken interlude performed by a young girl. The girl was recorded by Cole while visiting and speaking with kids at an elementary school in his hometown, Fayetteville, North Carolina. The foundation for the track "For Whom the Bell Tolls" was produced by New York University student Elijah Scarlett, Dreamville president Ibrahim Hamad discovered the beat on SoundCloud in January 2016 and reached out to Scarlett. Cole provided co-production, Nico Segal, Anthony Ware, and Theo Croker added horns, while duo Chargaux added strings. 4 Your Eyez Only is Scarlett's first major production credit, having previously only collaborated with friends. Producer Cardiak with help from Frank Dukes created the beat for the track "Immortal" with Cole in mind shortly after the release of Cole's previous album, 2014 Forest Hills Drive. In an interview with XXL magazine Cardiak said, "You know I was just always working on stuff for J. Cole. I had a idea of like the type of tracks he wanted, the sound and all that. I was just crafting a couple tracks. Shortly after 2014 Forest Hills Drive came out, I sent that beat over and he liked it and he told me to put it to the side and here we are today." Classical string duo Chargaux are credited on seven of the album's ten tracks, and were on many of the songs that got cut. They previously collaborated with Cole on the track "St. Tropez" from 2014 Forest Hills Drive. They provided string arrangements, background vocals and additional production on 4 Your Eyez Only.

Similar to his previous album, 4 Your Eyez Only contains no features, other than Dreamville signee Ari Lennox who provided additional vocals on the track "Change". Ibrahim Hamad (Cole's manager) spoke on it saying: "Cole's never gonna force anything. He's not the guy that's out, hanging out with rappers or in the studio with rappers all day. He's really in the studio with his team and making music with his producers and his artists. He's done songs with other people involved but it might not make the album. [His artist] Ari [Lennox's] voice made the album on "Change" because she came in, added something to it and it worked. If it doesn't work, Cole's not gonna put it on there because it's a name. He's never gonna put it on there just to say he got a feature." He continued saying, "He also didn't go into it like, "I'm gonna have no features on this album." He didn't go into Forest Hills Drive initially saying he was gonna have no features. That's just how it ended up. At the end of the day, the most important thing to him and to all of us is how do we get this point that we're trying to get through and how do we make the best version of a song?".

== Lyrics and themes ==
Lyrically, the album follows the story of a young man as he goes from selling crack to falling in love and starting a family. In the sixth track, "Change", it is revealed that he has died, and in the tenth and final track, we learn that almost the entire album is a tape he created for his daughter to listen to after he's gone. Upon release of 4 Your Eyez Only, many fans came up with theories about the meaning behind the album. Genius reached out to a source close to Dreamville, who confirmed that the storyline is about a real friend of Cole's, and that he changed the name to James for the sake of privacy. Casey Miller from the Daily Emerald described the album as "a track-by-track journey of a black man's experience of growing up in our nation, from encountering ghetto violence at a young age, suffering inescapable racial prejudices in real life and in the media and dealing with death and mortality. He also discusses falling in love and having a child, which provides a source of levity for the album because after all, not everything in life is tragic."

In an interview with Jon Caramanica for The New York Times in April 2017, Cole revealed that the album is told mostly through a character that's a composite of two men he grew up with in Fayetteville, Cole said:

He's a tough guy, a criminal stereotype, except inverted. The people that I know that live that life and come from that life, or even used to live that life, there's so much more than that. They have multiple sides, and the side that is the strongest is love — of mothers, of friends, of girlfriends, of children. The album's goal was to humanize the people that have been villainized in the media.

== Release and promotion ==
On December 2, 2016, Cole released a 40-minute documentary, titled Eyez via Tidal. The film features behind-the-scenes footage of Cole working with collaborators on the album, and was directed by Scott Lazer. The documentary also includes two music videos for the tracks "False Prophets" and "Everybody Dies". Both tracks were initially included on the album, however, both songs were omitted due to them not fitting the album's concept. The documentary was uploaded on Dreamville's YouTube channel on December 5, 2016.

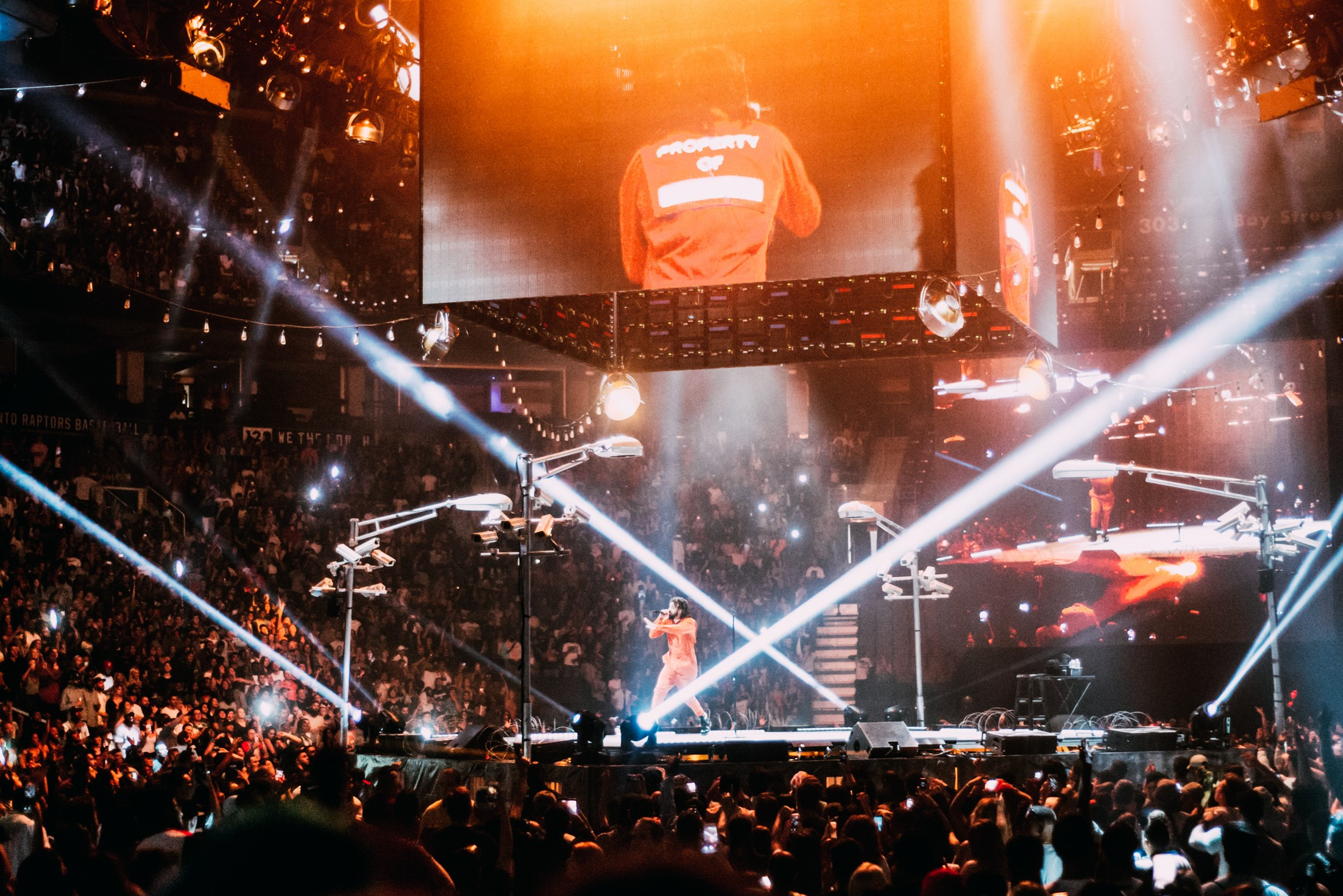
Cole performing at Air Canada Centre in Toronto as part of the 4 Your Eyez Only World Tour.

To further promote the album, Cole announced 4 Your Eyez Only World Tour on February 21, 2017. The tour included 62 dates across North America, Europe and Australia. The first 13 dates took place in smaller, intimate venues, while the next set of dates took place in arenas. The tour began June 1, 2017, in Columbia, South Carolina and concluded December 9, in Perth, Australia. A limited edition 4 Your Eyez Only collectors set was made available for pre-order on February 22, 2017, via Dreamville's website, with a shipping and release date of April 28, 2017. The bundle included 4 Your Eyez Only on vinyl, cassette and CD, or you could purchase each individually, the set also included limited artwork and 4 Your Eyez Only tour pre-sale access. Dreamville artists J.I.D, Ari Lennox and Lute served as opening acts on the first leg of the tour. Singer Anderson Paak and rapper Bas served as opening acts on the second leg of the tour, along with J.I.D and Ari Lennox. EarthGang joined J.I.D and Ari Lennox as opening acts on the European leg. The tour grossed $40 million. On September 2, 2017, Cole performed his entire 4 Your Eyez Only Tour setlist at the Budweiser Made in America Festival in Philadelphia.

On March 24, 2017 HBO announced a second documentary with Cole tiled, J. Cole: 4 Your Eyez Only, the first being Forest Hills Drive: Homecoming in 2016, the documentary aired April 15, 2017, on HBO and HBO Now. Incorporating music from 4 Your Eyez Only, Cole captured stories of residents in Baton Rouge, Louisiana, Atlanta, Georgia, Ferguson, Missouri, his father's hometown, Jonesboro, Arkansas and his hometown, Fayetteville, North Carolina. Entertainment Weekly reported, "The documentary promises to illustrate how their struggles over viable housing, voting laws for felons, integration, and more mirror the frustrations felt across the nation." The documentary included security camera footage of a SWAT raid that took place on March 18, 2016, at Cole's North Carolina home studio, which served as inspiration for the track "Neighbors". Cole also previewed new music in the documentary. The film was directed by Cole and Scott Lazer. The documentary was exclusively screened at the Troxy in London on April 19, 2017. On May 1, 2017, the film was uploaded on Dreamville's YouTube channel. Writing for Billboard, J'na Jefferson praised the film saying it "brings black perseverance to the forefront". Cole spoke about the documentary with The New York Times saying:

I felt like it would be mad powerful for black people to see black people talking to each other. And you see a rapper who's considered one of the biggest in the game, just listening. These are people that never get to be heard, by the world or even by each other. That lack of representation can lead to potentially catastrophic misunderstandings.

4 Your Eyez Only cassette cover art.

=== Singles ===
On January 10, 2017, "Deja Vu" was serviced to American mainstream urban radio, as the album's first single. The single debuted at number 7 on the US Billboard Hot 100, becoming Cole's first top 10 song. The single also debuted at number 4 on the US Hot R&B/Hip-Hop Songs. The track was produced by Vinylz and Boi-1da, with additional production from Cole, Ron Gilmore and Velous and samples "Swing My Way" by K. P. & Envyi.

"Neighbors" was serviced to rhythmic radio on April 25, 2017, as the album's second single. "Neighbors" debuted at number 13 on the US Billboard Hot 100 and number 8 on the US Hot R&B/Hip-Hop Songs chart. The song was produced by Cole, and during his 4 Your Eyez Only World Tour, Cole revealed the beat for "Neighbors" is the instrumental from his 2013 single, "Forbidden Fruit" played in reverse, with a tempo switch and snare removal. On May 1, 2017, the music video for "Neighbors" was uploaded on Cole's Vevo channel.

=== Other songs ===
On December 5, "False Prophets" and "Everybody Dies" were released as singles to iTunes and all streaming services. Both tracks charted on the US Billboard Hot 100, "False Prophets" peaked at number 54, while "Everybody Dies" peaked at number 57. The beat for "False Prophets" was composed by producer Freddie Joachim. The instrumental, titled "Waves" was used by multiple artists, most notably, fellow rapper Joey Badass, who used it for his track, "Waves", off his debut mixtape, 1999 (2012). Joey Badass said that Cole played him the track months before its release. XXL and Capital XTRA named "False Prophets" one of the best hip hop songs of 2016. XXL also named "Everybody Dies" one of the best diss tracks of 2016, while also naming it one of the best verses of 2016. 2DOPEBOYZ listed "Everybody Dies" among the best verses of 2016. On January 16, 2017, Cole released a track titled, "High for Hours", the song was produced by Elite and Cam O'bi. It was recorded in summer 2015 while on the Forest Hills Drive Tour, and was considered for 4 Your Eyez Only but was omitted due to it not fitting the narrative.

Music videos for the tracks "For Whom the Bell Tolls", "Immortal", "Ville Mentality", "Change", "She's Mine Pt. 2" and "4 Your Eyez Only" were included in the J. Cole: 4 Your Eyez Only HBO documentary. Cole never officially released the videos separately from the documentary, but all were eventually uploaded to YouTube by accounts not associated with Cole.

== Critical reception ==
Professional ratings
Aggregate scores
| Source | Rating |
|---|---|
| AnyDecentMusic? | 6.7/10 |
| Metacritic | 75/100 |
Review scores
| Source | Rating |
| AllMusic | 4/5 stars |
| Consequence of Sound | B |
| Exclaim! | 9/10 |
| The Guardian | 3/5 stars |
| The Independent | 3/5 stars |
| Now | 3/5 Ns |
| Pitchfork | 6.7/10 |
| PopMatters | 8/10 |
| Slant Magazine | 3/5 stars |
| XXL | 4/5 (XL) |

Upon its release, 4 Your Eyez Only received positive reviews from music critics. At Metacritic, which assigns a normalized rating out of 100 to reviews from mainstream publications, the album received an average score of 75, based on 14 reviews. Rob Boffard of Exclaim! praised J. Cole's songwriting stating, "Cole has always been one of the most slept-on songwriters in hip-hop, and on this record, he's better than he's ever been." Writing for The Guardian, Sheldon Pearce said, "there is still significant room for growth, but he has finally found his voice. It's only when he questioned his motivations that he discovered what was truly valuable: peace of mind." Jon Caramanica of The New York Times praised 4 Your Eyez Only, describing it as "spartan but sumptuous, emotionally acute but plain-spoken." He said, "there's an extraordinary sense of calm pervading this album, one of the year's most finely drawn." Jesse Fairfax from HipHopDX wrote that, "Cole deserves consideration for tugging at the heartstrings of listeners with raw human emotion but still leaves open the door to reach a musical zenith. Chris Robbins wrote a positive review for XXL saying, 4 Your Eyez Only "is a solid, short listen that relies on J. Cole's strength and comfort zone, perhaps a little too much at times, but the underlying concepts continue to add a layer of depth to his artistry."

Pitchfork writer Paul A. Thompson gave the album a 6.7 out of 10 stating, "on J. Cole's fourth album, he wrestles with the fragility of life and the importance of family ties, he also sands down some of his worst impulses." Kahron Spearman from The Daily Dot wrote that "though love and hope are sufficient motifs, Cole still suffers from lack of specificity (even when he channels one very specific character). No particular track punches through. Per Cole's usual, no new ground has been discovered—but in the right space, 4 Your Eyez Only pierces hearts. J. Cole made another wildly popular, OK rap album—and for now, that's fine." Writing for New York (Vulture), Craig Jenkins declared it Cole's "best and most mature album." In a positive review from The Advocate, Josh Jackson stated, "it may not have the force of 2014 Forest Hills Drive, but this is a highly personal set, confirming Cole's status as one of the best young rappers out there. Writing for The Hoya, Pranav Marupudi called the album Cole's "most mature yet, demonstrating, once again, that he may be one of the most talented rappers in the game."

4 Your Eyez Only received an editor rating of 83% on HotNewHipHop, they praised the album saying, it "overcomes an ambitious concept and a couple of awkward moments to stand as J. Cole's best album." Dominic Griffin writing for Spectrum Culture, gave the album 3 out of 5 stars, he stated: "J. Cole isn't as restlessly inventive or innovative as Kendrick Lamar. He's also not as charismatic or solipsistic as Drake. Here he smartly splits the difference between his closest competitors." William Sutton of PopMatters wrote a positive review, deeming the album Cole's "most mature and cohesive record to date", he commented saying: "Whilst 4 Your Eyez Only may not be full of the political rage and rhetoric of Run the Jewels or the figurehead positioning of To Pimp a Butterfly, it presents another perspective, a simpler, more grounded viewpoint. The record is written from the point of view of the very people who the media frequently discuss but rarely talk directly to. In its own way, it makes 4 Your Eyez Only as powerful as any of these other releases that have been held up by critics and fans alike." In an interview with Sporting News in December 2016, NBA player Karl-Anthony Towns praised the album, calling it "dopest album of the year".

=== Year-end lists ===
At the end of 2016, 4 Your Eyez Only appeared on a number of critics' lists ranking the year's top albums. HipHopDX listed the album at number 20 on their list of the 20 best rap albums of 2016, they commented saying, "Brandishing polished storytelling abilities (with the real-life account of "Neighbors" and the moving title track), the Villematic undoubtedly forgot a lot of the energy at home at Forest Hills Drive. Nonetheless, the succinct project was ripe for catalog building for one of the game's current elites." The Boombox listed the album at number 14, writer David Winter commented saying, "Cole inhabits different personas throughout 4 Your Eyez Only but it all feels like his voice. When he raps about doing laundry or being harassed by racist neighbors and the police, you know that it's coming from a very real place. It makes for one of the year's most somber—but rewarding—releases. This guy just keeps getting better." Sam Bennett of Contactmusic.com listed 4 Your Eyez Only among his top ten albums of 2016, he praised the album saying: "Cole is one of the most important voices in modern music, and with this latest LP he's crafted another body of work that points to rappers like Cole and Kendrick Lamar, who are making provocative, artistic albums that impact the music scene and spark conversation between people, being real contenders for those revered "Top Five Dead Or Alive" conversations."

XXL named the album one of the best hip hop projects of 2016, they said, "4 Your Eyez Only is a wonderfully well-produced concept album that tells two sides of a coming-of-age story from a young man who lives his life on the streets. Cole follows the same script as his previous album, 2014 Forest Hills Drive, delivering heartfelt, honest lyrics that brings fans closer into his mind." Rolling Stone listed the album at number 35 on their list of the 40 best rap albums of 2016, Timmhotep Aku commented saying: "this album is more than a 10-track eulogy: It's a well-executed meditation on love, loss, fatherhood and being black in America. Good reason to root for the underdog." Rap-Up listed the album at number 18 on their editors' list of the 20 best rap albums of 2016, while it was listed at number 5 by fans on their readers' choice list. The Birmingham News named the album one of their favorites from a Southern musician in 2016, writer Jared Boyd said: "Much sharper and less fluffy than his commercial output to date, 4 Your Eyez Only isn't a landmark record, by any means, but another step in the right direction after Cole's fan favorite 2014 Forest Hill Drive".

== Awards ==
4 Your Eyez Only received nominations for Top Rap Album at the 2017 Billboard Music Awards, and Album of the Year at the 2017 BET Awards. The album was also nominated for Album of the Year at the 2017 BET Hip Hop Awards. 4 Your Eyez Only World Tour was nominated for Top Rap Tour at the 2018 Billboard Music Awards.

== Commercial performance ==
In the United States, 4 Your Eyez Only was the final album of 2016 to hit number one on the Billboard 200, debuting at the top on the issue dating December 31, 2016, with 492,000 album-equivalent units, of which 363,000 were pure album sales, becoming Cole's fourth number one album. It had the third-largest weekly sales for an album in 2016, behind Views by Drake and Lemonade by Beyoncé. It was also the second-largest weekly streaming figure for an album in 2016, tallying 118,000 in SEA units (equaling 51.7 million streams of the album's songs) behind only Views. 4 Your Eyez Only, Views and The Weeknd's Starboy were the first albums ever to move over 100,000 albums in a week with streaming alone. Cole joined DMX and Drake as one of only three rappers to have their first four studio albums reach number one on the Billboard 200. The album remained in the chart's top five for the next several weeks. On January 12, 2017, 4 Your Eyez Only was certified Gold by the Recording Industry Association of America (RIAA), and only three months later was certified Platinum on April 7, 2017. In Canada, the album debuted at number one, selling 31,000 copies.

"Deja Vu" entered the US Billboard Hot 100 at number 7 without being released as a single at the time, becoming Cole's highest-charting song. All 10 songs from 4 Your Eyez Only debuted in the top 40 of the Hot 100, after only having four top 40 entries as a solo artist. Cole achieved twelve simultaneous Hot 100 entries in a single week.

4 Your Eyez Only was ranked as the tenth most popular album of 2017 on the Billboard 200.

== Controversy ==
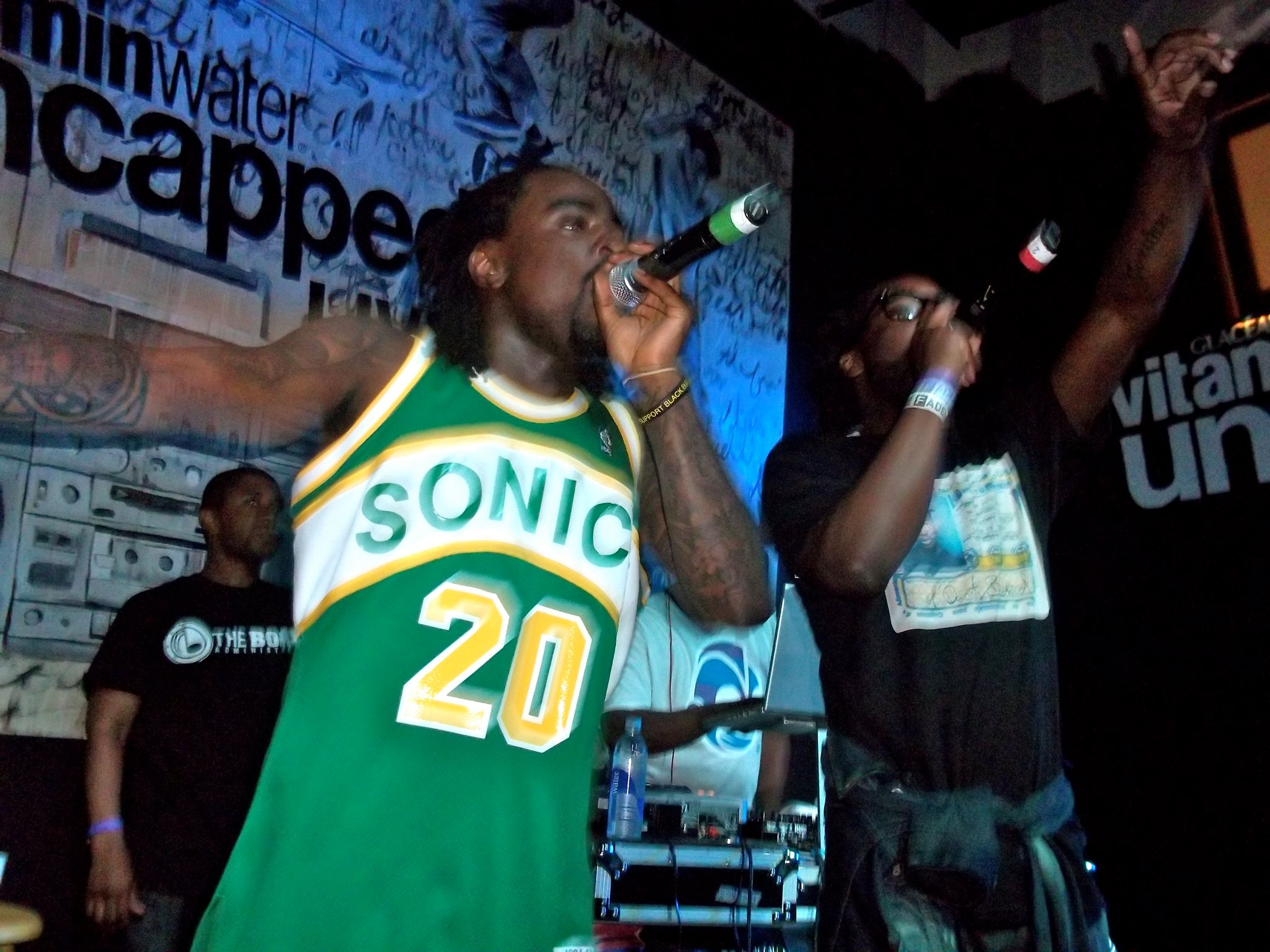
Rapper Wale responded to "False Prophets" with a track called "Groundhog Day"

Upon the release of Eyez documentary, "Everybody Dies" and "False Prophets" caused controversy within the hip hop community, as many assumed that "Everybody Dies" contained shots aimed at fellow rappers Lil Uzi Vert and Lil Yachty. During an interview with Los Angeles' radio station Power 106, Lil Yachty responded, saying: "I don't listen to J. Cole [but] I definitely listened to it [and] people said he was talking about me. He said 'Lil.' I'm not little. My name has 'Lil' in it but there's a lot of 'Lil' rappers. [It's] either me or Uzi. Honestly, I don't give a fuck." Lil Uzi Vert acknowledged the track, he responded via Twitter on December 2, 2016, by simply tweeting, "Heard some beautiful shit today @JColeNC" People also argued that the first verse on "False Prophets" consisted of direct shots at rapper Kanye West, due to Cole's referencing to West's altering public perception by the media and fans; as well as Kanye's recent hospitalization. Many also presumed that the second verse was directed at rapper Wale, with Cole saying that despite Wale's fourth album receiving fairly well critical and commercial success, Wale remains misunderstood and slighted by his peers. On December 3, Wale released a track, called "Groundhog Day" as a response to "False Prophets", and the pair were spotted together in Raleigh, North Carolina at a North Carolina State University basketball game later that day. Cole spoke about "False Prophets" in an interview with The New York Times, saying:

Rappers rap about other rappers all the time — subliminal insult, direct attack — but rarely from a place of love. "That speaks to the state of us as a people," he said. "For so long my mind state was, I have to show how much better than the next man I am through these bars. Who's the best? Let me prove it. And it's just like, damn, I'm really feeding into a cycle of keeping black people down, I'm really feeding into that.

Upon release of 4 Your Eyez Only, producers Vinylz and Boi-1da accused producer Foreign Teck of stealing their beat, to Cole's track "Deja Vu" and giving it to singer Bryson Tiller for his hit record "Exchange", explaining why the tracks share similarities. Vinylz said Cole's track was recorded before Tiller's, and that he sent Foreign Teck a video of him making the beat to "Deja Vu", and a week later Teck posted a beat on Instagram with the same drums. Vinylz also alleged that Foreign Teck offered him publishing, a tacit admission that he had reverse engineered the beat. Another producer by the name of Gmoney Baby also claimed that he made the beat. In an interview with Billboard, Ibrahim Hamad revealed that "Deja Vu" was originally intended for Cole's previous album, 2014 Forest Hills Drive (2014). He commented on the issue saying:

Cole had already made the song, so when Bryson's album came out and we heard it, it was a feeling like, "Damn, he used the same sample." But to Cole, it don't matter. He's not competing with Bryson. What Bryson's song did was incredible, and to Cole, it was like, "It's a part of the story I want to tell, so I'm gonna use [the beat]." We didn't really know the backstory at the time of what happened with Vinylz and Boi-1da and [ForeignTeck] who made the beat. That was none of our concern. We just knew that Bryson had a really dope song that was out that used the same sample, basically the same beat, and that we had a totally different song.

== Track listing ==
Credits adapted from the album's liner notes on Dreamville's official website and BMI's Repertoire.

| No. | Title | Writer(s) | Producer(s) | Length |
|---|---|---|---|---|
| 1. | "For Whom the Bell Tolls" | Jermaine Cole; Elijah Scarlett; Jasmine Easterly; Mtendere Mandowa; Nico Segal; Margaux Whitney | Scarlett; Cole^{[a]} | 2:07 |
| 2. | "Immortal" | Cole; Easterly; Carl McCormick; Whitney | Cardiak; Frank Dukes; Cole^{[b]} | 3:21 |
| 3. | "Deja Vu" | Cole; Anderson Hernandez; Matthew Samuels; Tyler Bryant; Javalyn Hall; Michael Johnson | Vinylz; Boi-1da; Velous; Cole^{[b]}; Ron Gilmore^{[b]} | 4:24 |
| 4. | "Ville Mentality" | Cole; Anthony Parrino; Ronald Gilmore; Easterly; Theodore Croker; Whitney | Gilmore; Elite; Cole^{[b]} | 3:14 |
| 5. | "She's Mine Pt. 1" | Cole; Jamil Pierre; Parrino; Gilmore; Easterly; Whitney; Bill Withers | Cole; Deputy; Gilmore^{[b]}; Elite^{[b]}; Chargaux^{[b]} | 3:29 |
| 6. | "Change" | Cole; Parrino; Gilmore; Whitney; James Yancey; James Branch Jr. | Cole; Elite^{[b]}; Gilmore^{[b]} | 5:31 |
| 7. | "Neighbors" | Cole; Parrino; Ronnie Foster | Cole; Elite^{[b]} | 3:36 |
| 8. | "Foldin Clothes" | Cole; Parrino; Steve Lacy | Cole; Lacy; Elite^{[b]}; Gilmore^{[b]} | 5:16 |
| 9. | "She's Mine Pt. 2" | Cole; Pierre; Parrino; Gilmore; Easterly; Whitney | Cole; Deputy; Gilmore^{[b]}; Elite^{[b]}; Chargaux^{[b]} | 4:38 |
| 10. | "4 Your Eyez Only" | Cole; Joshua Black; Parrino; Easterly; Whitney; Yuji Ohno | Blvk; Cole^{[a]}; Elite^{[a]}; Childish Major^{[b]} | 8:50 |
| Total length: | | | | 44:32 |

Notes

- ^{^[a]} signifies a co-producer.
- ^{^[b]} signifies an additional producer.
- "For Whom the Bell Tolls", "Immortal", "Deja Vu", and "Ville Mentality" feature background vocals by Kaye Foxx.
- "Change" features additional vocals by Ari Lennox.
- "Foldin Clothes" features talk-box by Irvin Washington, background vocals by Steve Lacy, and additional background vocals by T.S. Desandies and Brittany Carter.
- "4 Your Eyez Only" features additional vocals by Chargaux.

Sample credits

- "Immortal" contains samples of "Pianoparts", performed by Frank Dukes.
- "Deja Vu" contains samples of "Swing My Way", written by Javalyn Hill and Michael Johnson and performed by K. P. & Envyi.
- "Neighbors" is built off of the instrumental to an earlier Cole song, "Forbidden Fruit" featuring Kendrick Lamar.
- "Change" contains samples of "African Rhythms" written by James Yancey and James Branch Jr. and performed by J Dilla.
- "4 Your Eyez Only" contains samples of "To the Oasis" written and performed by Yuji Ohno.

== Personnel ==
Credits adapted from official liner notes.

Vocalists

- J. Cole – primary artist
- Kay Foxx – background vocals (tracks 1, 2, 3, 4)
- Ari Lennox – additional vocals (track 6)
- Brittany Carter – additional vocals (track 8)
- Irvin Washington – talk-box (track 8)
- Steve Lacy – background vocals (track 8)
- T.S. Desandies – additional vocals (track 8)
- Chargaux – additional vocals (track 10)

Musicians

- Nate Fox – musical arrangement (track 1)
- Peter Cottontale – musical arrangement (track 1)
- Nico Segal – horn arrangement (track 1)
- Anthony Ware – horns (track 1)
- Theo Croker – horns (track 1), trumpet arrangement (tracks 4, 10)
- Chargaux – string arrangement (tracks 1, 2, 4, 5, 6, 10)
- Matt McNeal – provided beat (track 2)
- Nate Jones – bass (tracks 3, 10)
- Deputy – wurlitzer (tracks 5, 9)
- J. Cole – guitar, bass (tracks 5, 6, 9)
- Ron Gilmore – piano, rhodes (tracks 7, 8)
- Steve Lacy – guitar, bass (track 8)
- Kyla Moscovich – trumpet (track 10)
- David Linaburg – guitar (track 10)
- Carlin White – drums (track 10)
- Nuno Malo – strings (track 10)
- Masayuki "BIGYUKI" Hirano – piano, rhodes, organ (track 10)

Technical

- Juro "Mez" Davis – mixing (tracks 1–10)
- Felton Brown – art direction
- Anthony "Supreme" Thompson – photography
- Delphine Diallo – cover design
- Scott Lazer – visual direction
- Chris Athens – mastering
- Beatriz Artola – assistant engineer (tracks 1, 2, 4, 5, 6, 7, 8, 9, 10)
- Gosha Usov – assistant engineer (tracks 1, 2, 4, 5, 6, 7, 8, 9, 10)

Managerial

- Jermaine Cole – executive producer
- Ibrahim Hamad – executive producer, A&R, management
- Anthony "Elite" Parrino – co-executive producer
- Adam Roy Rodney – creative direction, management
- Dreamville – marketing
- Roc Nation – marketing
- Chaka Pilgrim – Roc Nation executive
- Jay Brown – Roc Nation executive
- Shawn "Jay-Z" Carter – Roc Nation executive
- Joie Manda – Interscope executive
- John Janick – Interscope executive
- Steve Bermen – Interscope executive
- Nelly Ortiz – Roc Nation product manager
- Laura Carter – Interscope product manager
- Nicole Bilzerian – Interscope marketing
- Tim Glover for Interscope – A&R coordinator
- Gary Kelly for Interscope – sales
- Gretchen Anderson for Interscope – production
- Damien Granderson (for Davis Sharpiro Lewit Grabel Leven Granderson & Blake, LLP) – legal

Production

- Elijah Scarlett – production (track 1)
- Cardiak – production (track 2)
- Frank Dukes – production (track 2)
- Boi-1da – production (track 3)
- Velous – production (track 3)
- Vinylz – production (track 3)
- Ron Gilmore – production (track 4), additional production (tracks 3, 5, 6, 7, 8)
- Elite – production (tracks 4), additional production (tracks 5–9), co–production (track 10)
- J. Cole – production (tracks 5–9), co–production (tracks 1, 10), additional production (tracks 2–4)
- Chargaux – additional production (tracks 5, 9)
- Deputy – production (tracks 5, 9)
- Steve Lacy – production (track 8)
- BLVK – production (track 10)
- Childish Major – additional production (track 10)

== Charts ==
=== Weekly charts ===
| Chart (2016–2017) | Peak position |
|---|---|
| Australian Albums (ARIA) | 6 |
| Belgian Albums (Ultratop Flanders) | 34 |
| Belgian Albums (Ultratop Wallonia) | 121 |
| Canadian Albums (Billboard) | 1 |
| Danish Albums (Hitlisten) | 16 |
| Dutch Albums (Album Top 100) | 8 |
| Finnish Albums (Suomen virallinen lista) | 31 |
| French Albums (SNEP) | 127 |
| German Albums (Offizielle Top 100) | 79 |
| Irish Albums (IRMA) | 19 |
| Latvian Albums (LaIPA) | 47 |
| New Zealand Albums (RMNZ) | 10 |
| Norwegian Albums (VG-lista) | 6 |
| Portuguese Albums (AFP) | 31 |
| Scottish Albums (Official Charts) | 53 |
| Swedish Albums (Sverigetopplistan) | 3 |
| Swiss Albums (Schweizer Hitparade) | 16 |
| UK Albums (Official Charts) | 21 |
| UK Album Downloads (Official Charts) | 2 |
| UK R&B Albums (Official Charts) | 2 |
| US Billboard 200 | 1 |
| US Top R&B/Hip-Hop Albums (Billboard) | 1 |

=== Year-end charts ===
| Chart (2017) | Position |
|---|---|
| Canadian Albums (Billboard) | 24 |
| Swedish Albums (Sverigetopplistan) | 98 |
| US Billboard 200 | 10 |
| US Top R&B/Hip-Hop Albums (Billboard) | 9 |

== Certifications ==
| Region | Certification | Certified units/sales |
|---|---|---|
| Australia (ARIA) | Gold | 35,000^{‡} |
| Denmark (IFPI Danmark) | Gold | 10,000^{‡} |
| United Kingdom (BPI) | Gold | 100,000^{‡} |
| United States (RIAA) | 2× Platinum | 2,000,000^{‡} |
^{‡} Sales+streaming figures based on certification alone.

== Release history ==
| Region | Date | Format | Label |
|---|---|---|---|
| Australia | December 9, 2016 | CD; digital download | Dreamville; Roc Nation; Interscope; Polydor; Universal |
| Belgium | December 9, 2016 | CD; digital download | Dreamville; Roc Nation; Interscope; Polydor; Universal |
| Canada | December 9, 2016 | CD; digital download | Dreamville; Roc Nation; Interscope; Polydor; Universal |
| Denmark | December 9, 2016 | CD; digital download | Dreamville; Roc Nation; Interscope; Polydor; Universal |
| France | December 9, 2016 | CD; digital download | Dreamville; Roc Nation; Interscope; Polydor; Universal |
| Ireland | December 9, 2016 | CD; digital download | Dreamville; Roc Nation; Interscope; Polydor; Universal |
| Japan | December 9, 2016 | CD; digital download | Dreamville; Roc Nation; Interscope; Polydor; Universal |
| New Zealand | December 9, 2016 | CD; digital download | Dreamville; Roc Nation; Interscope; Polydor; Universal |
| United Kingdom | December 9, 2016 | CD; digital download | Dreamville; Roc Nation; Interscope; Polydor; Universal |
| United States | December 9, 2016 | CD; digital download | Dreamville; Roc Nation; Interscope; Polydor; Universal |
| Germany | December 12, 2016 | CD; digital download | Dreamville; Roc Nation; Interscope; Polydor; Universal |
| Italy | December 12, 2016 | CD; digital download | Dreamville; Roc Nation; Interscope; Polydor; Universal |
| Spain | December 12, 2016 | CD; digital download | Dreamville; Roc Nation; Interscope; Polydor; Universal |

== See also ==
- 2016 in hip hop music
- List of number-one albums of 2016 (Canada)
- List of Billboard 200 number-one albums of 2016
- List of Billboard number-one R&B/hip-hop albums of 2016
- 4 Your Eyez Only World Tour
- J. Cole: 4 Your Eyez Only
