= Anthony Supreme =

American photographer and creative director

- Born: Anthony Thompson; 1988 or 1989 (age 37–38); Monroe, North Carolina, U.S.
- Occupations: Photographer; Creative director
- Known for: 4 Your Eyez Only album artwork

Anthony "Supreme" Thompson (born 1988 or 1989) is an American photographer, creative director, and filmmaker. He is best known for shooting the album cover and packaging for J. Cole's 2016 album, 4 Your Eyez Only. He is also the founder of the independent arts and culture publication, Preme Magazine.

== Early life ==
Anthony "Supreme" Thompson was raised in Monroe, North Carolina. He attended USC Charlotte, where he studied social work. Before becoming a full-time creative, Supreme served in the U.S. military for six years.

In 2015, Supreme's mother died following a long battle with sarcoidosis. Following her death, he decided to leave North Carolina to pursue a career in film and photography in Los Angeles. He sold his car and purchased a campervan, which he lived in while establishing his career on the West Coast.

== Career ==
Supreme began his career directing music videos in the Charlotte and Monroe areas of North Carolina. In 2013, Noisey recognized his work on the music video "The Woods" by artist OxyXMoron. After moving to Los Angeles, he transitioned from directing to photography. During this period, he connected with director Scott Lazer, whom he had known from North Carolina. Lazer introduced Supreme's work to the rapper J. Cole.

In 2016, Supreme was hired to photograph the artwork for J. Cole's fourth studio album, 4 Your Eyez Only. Supreme received the offer to work on the project via a text message from Scott while visiting a record store in Sydney. He traveled with J. Cole and Scott Lazer for two weeks across North Carolina, Atlanta, and Baton Rouge. Supreme took over 5,000 photographs during the trip. He pitched the final image selected for the cover to J. Cole on a tour bus in September.

The final cover image selected for the album features a black-and-white photograph of J. Cole sitting in a neighborhood in Atlanta. The image captures a young boy looking at the rapper, while J. Cole looks away from the camera. Supreme stated that the shoot was spontaneous and the child in the photo did not know who J. Cole was at the time. In addition to album artwork, Supreme served as the tour photographer for J. Cole's 4 Your Eyez Only Tour and KOD Tour.

Supreme has worked with various musical artists, including GoldLink, Denzel Curry, JID, Cozz, and Young Thug. In 2019, he launched Preme Magazine, an independent, Black-owned publication. The magazine features interviews and photography of musicians and visual artists.

== Artistry ==
Supreme's photography style often utilizes black-and-white imagery and 35mm film. He prefers to capture candid, "in-the-moment" shots rather than staged compositions. He has cited album covers by bands such as Linkin Park and Slayer as inspirations for his visual approach.
