= Pretty Little Liars season 1 =

Pretty Little Liars
- Season 1
- Season 1 DVD cover
- Starring: Troian Bellisario; Ashley Benson; Holly Marie Combs; Lucy Hale; Ian Harding; Bianca Lawson; Laura Leighton; Chad Lowe; Shay Mitchell; Nia Peeples; Sasha Pieterse
- No. of episodes: 22

Release
- Original network: ABC Family
- Original release: June 8, 2010 – March 21, 2011

Season chronology
- Next → Season 2

The first season of Pretty Little Liars, based on the books of the same name by Sara Shepard, premiered on June 8, 2010, and concluded on March 21, 2011, on ABC Family.

The show premiered to 2.47 million viewers and retained a regular audience of 2.5 million viewers during its summer run. The summer finale scored 3.07 million viewers, achieving a series high. The show went on hiatus and returned with its winter premiere on January 3, 2011, with 4.20 million viewers, becoming one of ABC Family's top telecasts to date.

== Overview ==
Set in the fictional town of Rosewood, Pennsylvania, Spencer Hastings, Aria Montgomery, Hanna Marin, Emily Fields, and Alison DiLaurentis' lives are irrevocably changed after their clique leader Alison "Ali" goes missing during a sleepover. The four remaining girls forever believe their secrets are safe for all time, but the absence of one of their leaders makes them drift apart. One year later, the former group of friends are forced to reunite after their once-missing friend is discovered dead, and they begin receiving threatening texts from someone named "A," who utilizes secrets that only their dead friend would know to terrorize them. Knowing that if their secrets are out, it will jeopardize them and their futures, the girls decide to team up and figure out who is behind the mask.

== Cast ==
=== Main ===
- Troian Bellisario as Spencer Hastings
- Ashley Benson as Hanna Marin
- Holly Marie Combs as Ella Montgomery
- Lucy Hale as Aria Montgomery
- Ian Harding as Ezra Fitz
- Bianca Lawson as Maya St. Germain (Note: From episode 14 onwards, Lawson is no longer credited in the main cast.)
- Laura Leighton as Ashley Marin
- Chad Lowe as Byron Montgomery
- Shay Mitchell as Emily Fields
- Nia Peeples as Pam Fields (Note: Specifically in the pilot episode, Peeples is credited in the main cast, while Pieterse is credited as a guest star. From the second episode onwards, Peeples is credited as a guest and Pieterse joins the starring credits.)
- Sasha Pieterse as Alison DiLaurentis

=== Recurring ===
- Keegan Allen as Toby Cavanaugh (Note: In the pilot episode, Cavanaugh, Thomas, and DiLaurentis are respectively portrayed by James Neate, Carlo Marks, and Anne Marie DeLuise.)
- Tammin Sursok as Jenna Marshall
- Janel Parrish as Mona Vanderwaal
- Torrey DeVitto as Melissa Hastings
- Ryan Merriman as Ian Thomas
- Chuck Hittinger as Sean Ackard
- Tyler Blackburn as Caleb Rivers
- Brendan Robinson as Lucas Gottesman
- Brant Daugherty as Noel Kahn
- Lesley Fera as Veronica Hastings
- Cody Allen Christian as Mike Montgomery
- Lindsey Shaw as Paige McCullers
- Bryce Johnson as Darren Wilden
- Diego Boneta as Alex Santiago

=== Guest ===
- Julian Morris as Wren Kingston
- Nolan North as Peter Hastings
- Jim Titus as Officer Barry Maple
- Yani Gellman as Garrett Reynolds
- Eric Steinberg as Wayne Fields
- Jill Holden as Mrs. Welch
- Amanda Schull as Meredith Sorenson
- Carlson Young as Amber Victorino
- Parker Bagley as Jason DiLaurentis
- Andrea Parker as Jessica DiLaurentis
- Roark Critchlow as Tom Marin
- Tilky Jones as Logan Reed
- Patrick J. Adams as Hardy
- Sara Shepard as Ms. Shepard
- 2AM Club as themselves

== Episodes ==
No. overall	No. in season	Title	Directed by	Written by	Original release date	U.S. viewers (millions)
1	1	"Pilot"	Lesli Linka Glatter	I. Marlene King	June 8, 2010	2.47
Aria Montgomery, Emily Fields, Hanna Marin, and Spencer Hastings grow distant after the disappearance of their clique leader, Alison DiLaurentis. A year later, they begin receiving anonymous messages from a figure known as "A", who threatens to expose their secrets. Aria returns from a year in Iceland and knows about her father Byron's affair, which her mother does not yet know about. She also learns that her English teacher, Ezra Fitz, is the man she met and kissed at a bar the previous day. Hanna has become the school's "it" girl but indulges in shoplifting; when she is caught, her mother Ashley sleeps with Detective Wilden to secure her release. Spencer develops feelings for her sister Melissa's fiancé, Wren Kingston, and Emily befriends Maya St. Germain, who has moved into Alison's former home. The friends initially suspect Alison of being "A", but her body is later discovered. At the funeral, they see Jenna Marshall, a classmate blinded in an incident involving the girls and Alison, and soon receive another message: "I'm still here bitches. And I know everything. –A."
2	2	"The Jenna Thing"	Liz Friedlander	I. Marlene King	June 15, 2010	2.48
With Jenna's return to Rosewood and A's messages, the girls are forced to confront the past incident in which they and Alison played a prank on Jenna's stepbrother, Toby, by setting their garage on fire; the plan went wrong, leaving Jenna blind. Aria attempts to transfer out of Ezra's class, but her request is denied; the two later resume their relationship after kissing in his car. Melissa ends her engagement to Wren after discovering him kissing Spencer. Ashley remains reluctantly involved with Wilden, who doubts the girls' account of the night Alison disappeared. Emily hosts Maya temporarily and begins developing feelings for her despite being in a relationship with her boyfriend Ben. Meanwhile, Byron attempts to repair his marriage, leading to progress within the family.
3	3	"To Kill a Mocking Girl"	Elodie Keene	Oliver Goldstick	June 22, 2010	2.74
The girls try to pay tribute to Alison's memory, but are still faced with unresolved issues. Toby returns to school. Aria has an unpleasant encounter with Byron's former mistress. Spencer faces a vengeful Melissa after her kiss with Wren. Hanna tries to get her boyfriend Sean to forget the "old Hanna". Toby and Ben have a fight and Emily breaks up with Ben. Emily and Maya get closer, since Ben is no longer in the picture, and Spencer copies Melissa's essay and claims it as her own. 'A' ending: 'A' listens to jazz music as they print copies of the pictures of Emily and Maya in the photo booth.
4	4	"Can You Hear Me Now?"	Norman Buckley	Joseph Dougherty	June 29, 2010	2.09
The girls block e-mails and text messages from all unknown users in an attempt to stop "A", but their problems are far from over. One of the girls receives a surprise visit, while another receives a surprise gift in class. Hanna meets with her father after a while and learns that he has a fiancée. Aria tries to tell Ella about Byron cheating on her before they went to Iceland, but it looks like "A" beats her to it. Emily is still confused about Toby and her kiss with Maya. Spencer's Russian article that she copied from Melissa gets entered in a contest and she is still confused about Wren. Spencer arrives home with Hanna to find that somebody has been in her house and left a grave on her table and a message on her mirror written in lipstick.
5	5	"Reality Bites Me"	Wendey Stanzler	Bryan M. Holdman	July 6, 2010	2.62
Aria forgets her cell phone in Ezra's apartment, and after he reads a message from "A", he decides to break up with her (thinking that she told someone) rather than risk being fired. Hanna has to work in a dentist office to pay for the damage she did to Sean's car and gets some new information from "A" about one of her friends. She sees Jenna at the office building wearing the same lipstick used for the writing on Spencer's mirror. Emily hides her budding friendship with Toby due to the girls' suspicion about him, hurting his feelings. Spencer's father tells her to throw a tennis match against a possible client and his daughter. Ella deals with Byron's cheating, which makes things worse for Aria and Mike.
6	6	"There's No Place Like Homecoming"	Norman Buckley	Maya Goldsmith	July 13, 2010	2.69
Emily accepts an offer to attend the homecoming dance with Toby, despite Hanna presuming she wanted to go with Maya. Spencer gets ready for homecoming with Alex as her date, but will things go as she planned them to? Hanna meets Lucas when she joins the "Real Love Waits" celibacy club with Sean. Aria is still reeling over her breakup with Ezra and the tension between her parents. Spencer asks Hanna to collect Jenna's psychotherapy file, while she does her community service. At homecoming, Toby takes Emily to an isolated lab and later the other three find it empty with blood on the ground. 2AM Club guest stars in this episode. 'A' ending: 'A' sprays over the town sign and changes the population census to one less number.
7	7	"The Homecoming Hangover"	Chris Grismer	Tamar Laddy	July 20, 2010	2.55
Toby drops Emily at hospital and vanishes. The police don't believe Emily when she says she tripped and neither does her mother. Jenna visits Emily asking for the stolen file. Aria's brother, Mike, is upset their parents are separating, which leads to him to involve himself in a fight at school. Emily decides to try dating Maya after support from Hanna. Hanna and Sean reconcile, but she is more interested in Lucas. Spencer persuades Alex to agree to another date, but this time, he will plan it. "A" leaves a creepy message for the girls, which makes them assume that Toby might be dead. Sara Shepard, writer of the Pretty Little Liars novel series, makes a special appearance in the episode as a substitute teacher at Rosewood High School. 'A' ending: 'A' fishes up the documents the girls threw in the river, containing files of Toby Cavanaugh.
8	8	"Please, Do Talk About Me When I'm Gone"	Arlene Sanford	Joseph Dougherty	July 27, 2010	2.52
As new evidences about the day that Alison died comes to the surface, Spencer gets some damaging information from Alison's brother, Jason. Aria agrees to go out on a double date with Sean's friend, Noel. Emily and Maya's relationship blossoms when Emily asks Maya on a date. Hanna's credit card gets declined and when she asks her Mom why her Mom says they can't live a two income lifestyle on one income, so Hanna decides to put some of her old designer clothes and handbags up for auction online with the help of Lucas. Meanwhile, the girls begin to prepare themselves for Alison's memorial day, but once they discover that Jenna will be the one to deliver a speech about Alison, they get scared - but Jenna does not say anything revealing. Later that night, a mystery person comes out and destroys Alison's memorial. 'A' ending: 'A' destroys Alison's memorial.
9	9	"The Perfect Storm"	Jamie Babbit	Oliver Goldstick	August 3, 2010	2.55
During a storm that traps the students inside the school, Emily follows a clue to the library and finds an old letter she once sent Alison hidden in a book, reminding her of their past kiss and Alison's subsequent rejection. Her purse then goes missing. In the music room, Aria is about to kiss Noel, but is interrupted by Ezra. Spencer learns that the police discovered Emily's purse and letter and suspect her of vandalizing Alison's memorial. She denies involvement, and her mother intervenes. 'A' ending: 'A' sends a file containing video footage of Alison the day she disappeared, to Rosewood Police Department.
10	10	"Keep Your Friends Close"	Ron Lagomarsino	I. Marlene King	August 10, 2010	3.07
The FBI are now involved and believe that Toby killed Alison. They show a video to the girls of Alison flirting to camera. The girls identify the top she wears as her own, but not the cardigan. They also recognise the place. Spencer tries to mend fences with Melissa, just as her ex-boyfriend Ian returns. Mona receives a message from "A" saying that Hanna lost weight via liposuction. She publicly ends her friendship with Hanna. Emily's father returns from his deployment and her mother is sent a picture of Emily and Maya kissing. Aria has feelings for Noel, but Ezra admits his feelings for her and they kiss. Hanna sees this. Ashley's financial problems are bringing her to the brink of theft. Meanwhile, the Aria, Spencer and Emily go "glamping" in the woods for Mona's birthday. Hanna plans to spy on them in case "A" is there. Toby finds Emily and says he was with Alison that day and he lent her his cardigan but she got in a car with another man and also that Jenna was obsessed with him. "A"'s identity is revealed to Hanna but "A" runs her over with a car before she has a chance to tell the others. Toby is arrested. 'A' ending: 'A' looks at the video of Alison at the Kissing Rock and it is revealed that Ian Thomas was with her.
11	11	"Moments Later"	Norman Buckley	Joseph Dougherty	January 3, 2011	4.20
Hanna is now in the hospital and remembers who A is. She tells the girls it was Noel Kahn because she saw him write 'I see you' on the back on Ezra's car while Aria and Ezra were kissing. But the girls are starting to question if the person who killed Alison, and "A" are two different people. Meanwhile, Melissa and Ian elope. Lucas admits his feelings for Hanna, but is both angry and heartbroken when she tells him she only likes him as a friend, as a result he tells her that she deserves a better boyfriend than Sean. The girls find out that "A" wrote a message on Hanna's leg cast reading: "Sorry for losing my temper, my bad," which the girls suspect was written by someone who entered Hanna's room while she was asleep. Emily finally plucks up enough courage to come out to her parents; her father accepts it lovingly, however her mother has a much harder time accepting it. 'A' ending: 'A' burns the part of the tree which had the carving of Alison and Ian's name on it.
12	12	"Salt Meets Wound"	Norman Buckley	Oliver Goldstick	January 10, 2011	3.21
Hanna mends in a wheelchair upon her release from the hospital, and Mona throws a surprise party for her. At the end of the party, Ashley and Hanna realize someone has stolen the bank loan kept in a lasagna box. Meanwhile, Aria is struggling to tell Ezra that Noel knows about their relationship; Spencer's romance with Alex hits a snag and Emily invites Maya to dinner with her family. Surprises haunt the Liars as "A" continues the game. It is also revealed that Lucas destroyed Alison's memorial and Jenna was the one who told the police where Toby was. 'A' ending: 'A' puts the hundred dollar bills into a clown piggy bank.
13	13	"Know Your Frenemies"	Ron Lagomarsino	I. Marlene King	January 17, 2011	2.99
"A" makes Hanna eat cupcakes, making her think about being bulimic again. "A" saves Aria's and Ezra's relationship. Emily's Mom finds drugs in Maya's bag, and brings the bag to Maya's parents, thus sending her to juvie. Spencer unravels the Ali murder, thinking Ian is the killer. She also finds out that Melissa is trying to get pregnant. In the end, a video of Ali and Ian is shown, the camera falls, leaving the watchers hearing someone choking someone. A body is thrown to the ground, Ali's hand appearing in front of the screen. Her name bracelet brings the girls to think Ian killed Ali. 'A' ending: 'A' runs away after spying on the girls and sending them the video.
14	14	"Careful What U Wish 4"	Norman Buckley	Tamar Laddy	January 24, 2011	3.17
As the school gets ready for the dance-a-thon, Aria, Emily, Hanna and Spencer have more on their minds than raising money for the school trip to Washington, D.C. Hanna and her mother are having a financial crisis, but when 'A' leaves her an offer that would potentially break Lucas's heart but get her out of money troubles, will she be able to refuse? Emily can only think of Maya and is desperate to speak to her -- so much so that she enlists the help of Caleb, the new bad boy in the school. And as an important piece of property goes missing, Spencer finds being in close quarters with her new brother-in-law, Ian, more difficult than ever. Meanwhile, Aria's former babysitter, Simone (Alona Tal), comes back to town for a surprise visit. But what should be a happy reunion quickly becomes a nightmare for Aria when Simone sets her sights on Ezra. 'A' ending: 'A' receives their black jacket and gloves from Ella Montgomery at the dance-a-thon.
15	15	"If at First You Don't Succeed, Lie, Lie Again"	Ron Lagomarsino	Maya Goldsmith	January 31, 2011	3.19
The girls try to resume a sense of normalcy in their lives. Emily must deal with a jealous teammate, Paige, (Lindsey Shaw) who is threatened by Emily's return to the pool. Aria and Ezra plan their first date out in the open in another town at an art exhibit. Hanna is offered money By 'A' provided she slips Aria's mother Ella a ticket to the same art exhibit. Hanna wrestles with her conscience but does it. In return - or is it? - Hanna's Mom receives news that Mrs Potter, whose money she 'borrowed' has had a heart attack and died. Ella's car fails and she calls Byron who can't fix it but drives her to the exhibition. They end up kissing and don't go inside. Paige is homophobic and threatens Emily as she sees her as a rival for swim captain. Meanwhile, Spencer turns to Ali's brother, Jason, for information about the night they believe Alison died, only to have to face part of her unpleasant past with Ali. 'A' ending: 'A' visits the bead lady and receives a cup of tea as the lady tells her she has done what 'A' told her to do.
16	16	"Je Suis Une Amie"	Chris Grismer	Bryan M. Holdman	February 7, 2011	3.14
Emily and Paige are to compete for the position of anchor leg of a big race. Paige visits Emily in the night to apologise and next day their coach says there won't be a swim-off because Paige hurt herself. Caleb removed the kill switch from Aria's Mom's car to help Hanna and he now calls in his favor as he needs to meet more the rich kids to gain new customers. Hanna worries when Aria finds her Mom's ticket to the exhibition in her father's jacket. Spencer offers to tutor Toby in French to get to talk him. She thinks the person who put down her name for the beadwork bracelets also framed him. The girls discover Caleb is avoiding foster care by staying in the school to use hot water and steal food. Hanna offers him a sofa in her basement. 'A' ending: 'A' listens to a French tutorial while arranging different objects.
17	17	"The New Normal"	Michael Grossman	Joseph Dougherty	February 14, 2011	2.35
Aria's dad has a parent-teacher interview with Ezra and is rude because he believes Ezra intends to date Aria's Mom. Meanwhile Toby and Spencer start to get closer when the DA drops charges and she drives him to have his tag removed. Spencer and the girls translate a note Toby gave them. It says 'bad' or '214'. Mrs. Potter's alleged nephew tries to access Mrs. Potter's safety deposit box but Caleb has noticed inconsistencies in the man and by warning Hanna her Mom is able to protect the box. Paige's father shows up at the school and makes a scene in the school cafeteria implying Emily is getting chosen over Paige because she is gay. Later, when Emily is in her car, Paige shows up and kisses her. She quickly leaves saying, "Don't tell." Melissa says she is pregnant to Ian. 'A' ending: 'A' places flowers on top of Mrs. Esther Marie Potter's grave.
18	18	"The Badass Seed"	Paul Lazarus	Oliver Goldstick & Francesca Rollins	February 21, 2011	2.90
Aria's dad apologises to Ezra when he realises several members of staff are going on the trip he thought was a date with Aria's Mom. The girls are cast in the school play together; when they finish rehearsing they find a blood-stained trophy engraved with Ian's name and hand it to the police.. but it turns out to be rat's blood. In school, Ian is seen handing a bag to Jenna. Spencer is concerned because Ian is a coach and Jenna is not an athlete. Everyone revisits memories about when they crashed a frat party. Aria uses the play to get closer to Mr. Fitz/ Ezra by becoming stage manager but the two start arguing over the play and their future - Aria is looking at college in California but wants Ezra to go with her. Aria resigns from the play. Hanna and Caleb kiss. The police come after the girls with questions. 'A' ending: Four cages are shown in 'A's' house with a rat in each of them with the name of the Liars. The rat is missing from the cage with Spencer's name.
19	19	"A Person of Interest"	Ron Lagomarsino	I. Marlene King & Jonell Lennon	February 28, 2011	2.69
the police wonder if the girls faked the trophy. The police take a special interest in Spencer, who accuses Ian of murder and says he might be interested in underage girls. Spencer's family want her to see a shrink. Toby stays in a motel till his parents get home to avoid Jenna, and Spencer hears a flute playing in room 214. They suspect it is Jenna - with Ian? But they get a note saying 'you're getting colder'. Paige invites Emily for a secret date out of town but when Paige says they can only see each other in secret, Emily bows out. The truth surrounding what happened in Hilton Head is revealed. Hanna's mom throws Caleb out the house. Hanna pitches a tent for him in the woods and later loses her virginity to Caleb. Hanna's Mom agrees to let Caleb stay. Toby and Spencer kiss. When Spencer gets home the cops are there and it is revealed that her and Ian were hooking up a few years ago. 'A' ending: 'A' watches a footage of the girls receiving 'A's' texts while eating popcorn, and replays the video.
20	20	"Someone to Watch Over Me"	Arlene Sanford	Joseph Dougherty	March 7, 2011	2.95
Emily and Aria overhear Caleb arguing with someone on the phone about Hanna. They tell Hanna they believe it was a girl, and soon they see Jenna with a pendant Hanna thought Caleb intended for her -- and which turns out to be a flash drive. Hanna confronts Caleb, who says he's been spying for Jenna and she kicks him out of the house for good. Later, Hanna runs into Jenna in the school restroom and slaps her then leaves. Aria texts Ezra but sends the text to her Mom by mistake. There is no name on it, so Aria's mom assumes it was for a boy. Aria refuses to say who it is. Aria's dad expresses concern and the two argue in Aria's bedroom. Rather than stay for dinner Aria's Mom leaves saying Aria has learnt 'privacy' from her cheating Dad. Ian encourages Spencer to run away, and Toby asks her not to. Spencer's mother tells Spencer that the police have new evidence against her, but that she thinks Spencer is innocent. Emily and Paige reconcile after Paige says she wants to come out but is scared. 'A' ending: 'A' smashes a glass heart with Hanna's name on it, and puts it in a box with a letter to Hanna.
21	21	"Monsters in the End"	Chris Grismer	Oliver Goldstick	March 14, 2011	2.94
Aria discovers that Ezra was once engaged to a girl in college called Jackie Molina. Paige fails to show for a meeting with a girl from a Pride group and Emily. The girl invites Emily to the Founders Festival as she has a jewelry stall there. Paige turns up and things are awkward. Later, Emily finds the storage locker key in a snow globe Ali gave her. Caleb comes to the Marins' home to drop off a letter for Hanna and lets Ashley know that he is leaving Rosewood but Ashley suggests he deliver the letter to Hanna at the fair. Hanna hides and Mona receives and tears up the letter. Spencer finds out that Melissa and Ian might not have stayed in the same room at the Hilton Head when Alison was there. Spencer is supposed to meet up with Toby but someone traps Her in the funhouse. Ian rescues her, and Spencer unites with Toby and they share a kiss. The girls visit the storage room, where they find Ali's old lunchbox containing a flash drive. While watching it, they discover that someone had been spying on them for a long time. 'A' ending: 'A' swipes the key from underneath Ezra's doormat.
22	22	"For Whom the Bell Tolls"	Lesli Linka Glatter	I. Marlene King	March 21, 2011	3.64
The flash drive footage, mostly in bedrooms, includes Alison so she didn't take them. But the fact she had possession of them suggests she was killed for knowing their contents. The girls confront Jenna over footage showing her saying she can cry rape on Toby. She says Alison came to hospital and blackmailed her into leaving town (Alison said the guy she liked had made the films). Spencer buys a prepaid phone, and uses it to tell Ian that they found the video and to come to the park with $10,000. Aria's mother has a get together with all of the teachers, but Aria is shocked to see Ezra's past love show up. Melissa cannot find her phone, so Spencer offers to drive her to the church to find it but the car crashes. We see Garrett kissing Jenna in her house. Emily, Hanna and Aria go to the park to meet Ian. Garrett arrives. Spencer returns to the church to look for Ian and he chases her to the top of the tower, then reveals that he knocked Alison unconscious and attacks her. Her phone is connected to the girls' and they hear what the two say. A hooded figure pushes Ian off the tower, seemingly killing him. When the police show up, they think the girls are lying because Ian is nowhere to be found.

== Development and production ==
Originally developed as a television series by book packaging company Alloy Entertainment, the idea was described as "Desperate Housewives for teens." Alloy met with author Shepard, and gave her the property to develop into a book series. With Alloy and Warner Horizon interested in producing a Pretty Little Liars television series for years, it was first planned for The WB in 2005 with a different writer. The first novel was published by HarperTeen in October 2006. In June 2008, Alloy noted that it was developing a Pretty Little Liars television pilot for ABC Family. The novels are being adapted for television by I. Marlene King. The series' pilot was filmed in Vancouver in December 2009. Filming for the series moved to Los Angeles from the second episode onward.

== Casting ==
ABC Family began casting for a Pretty Little Liars television pilot in October 2009. Lucy Hale was cast as Aria Montgomery in the project, followed by Troian Bellisario and Ian Harding (as Spencer Hastings and Ezra Fitz, respectively) in November 2009. In December 2009 The Futon Critic confirmed the casting of Ashley Benson as Hanna Marin and Shay Mitchell as Emily Fields, as well as the addition of Laura Leighton as Ashley Marin, Alexis Denisof as Byron Montgomery, Bianca Lawson as Maya, as well as Jean Louisa Kelly and Nia Peeples. The Hollywood Reporter also noted that Torrey DeVitto and Sasha Pieterse landed recurring roles in the pilot.

The Alloy website later confirmed that Pieterse would be playing Alison DiLaurentis and DeVitto would be Melissa Hastings, also noting Janel Parrish as Mona Vanderwaal and Cody Allen Christian, as Mike Montgomery. In April 2010, Chad Lowe replaced Alexis Denisof as Aria's father, Byron Montgomery. Also in April, Holly Marie Combs was cast as Ella Montgomery.

== Ratings ==
=== Live + SD ratings ===
No. in series	No. in season	Episode	Air date	Time slot (EST)	Rating/Share (18–49)	Viewers (m)
1	1	"Pilot"	June 8, 2010	Tuesdays; 8:00 p.m.	0.9	2.47
2	2	"The Jenna Thing"	June 15, 2010	Tuesdays; 8:00 p.m.	1.0	2.48
3	3	"To Kill a Mocking Girl"	June 22, 2010	Tuesdays; 8:00 p.m.	1.0	2.74
4	4	"Can You Hear Me Now?"	June 29, 2010	Tuesdays; 8:00 p.m.	0.7	2.08
5	5	"Reality Bites Me"	July 6, 2010	Tuesdays; 8:00 p.m.	1.0	2.62
6	6	"There's No Place Like Homecoming"	July 13, 2010	Tuesdays; 8:00 p.m.	0.9	2.69
7	7	"The Homecoming Hangover"	July 20, 2010	Tuesdays; 8:00 p.m.	0.9	2.55
8	8	"Please, Do Talk About Me When I'm Gone"	July 27, 2010	Tuesdays; 8:00 p.m.	0.9	2.52
9	9	"The Perfect Storm"	August 3, 2010	Tuesdays; 8:00 p.m.	0.9	2.55
10	10	"Keep Your Friends Close"	August 10, 2010	Tuesdays; 8:00 p.m.	1.1	3.07
11	11	"Moments Later"	January 3, 2011	Mondays; 8:00 p.m.	1.5	4.20
12	12	"Salt Meets Wound"	January 10, 2011	Mondays; 8:00 p.m.	1.1	3.21
13	13	"Know Your Frenemies"	January 17, 2011	Mondays; 8:00 p.m.	1.2	2.99
14	14	"Careful What You Wish For"	January 24, 2011	Mondays; 8:00 p.m.	1.2	3.17
15	15	"If at First You Don't Succeed, Lie, Lie Again"	January 31, 2011	Mondays; 8:00 p.m.	1.2	3.19
16	16	"Je Suis Une Amie"	February 7, 2011	Mondays; 8:00 p.m.	1.1	3.14
17	17	"The New Normal"	February 14, 2011	Mondays; 8:00 p.m.	0.9	2.35
18	18	"The Bad Seed"	February 21, 2011	Mondays; 8:00 p.m.	1.0	2.90
19	19	"A Person of Interest"	February 28, 2011	Mondays; 8:00 p.m.	1.0	2.69
20	20	"Someone to Watch Over Me"	March 7, 2011	Mondays; 8:00 p.m.	1.1	2.95
21	21	"Monsters in the End"	March 14, 2011	Mondays; 8:00 p.m.	1.1	2.94
22	22	"For Whom the Bell Tolls"	March 21, 2011	Mondays; 8:00 p.m.	1.3	3.64

== DVD release ==
The Complete First Season
Set details			Special features
22 episodes; 963 minutes (Region 1); 940 minutes (Region 2); 925 minutes (Region 4); 6-disc set; 1.85:1 aspect ratio; Languages: English (Dolby Digital 2.0 Surround); Subtitles: English, and French (Region 1); English, Spanish, Danish, French, Arabic, Dutch, Norwegian, Swedish, English for the Hearing Impaired (Regions 2 and 4)			Deleted scenes: Episodes: 2, 3, 5, 8, 12, 13, 14, 16, 19; Pretty Little Liars: Two Truths and a Lie - The girls take turns revealing three things about themselves, not all of the true.; It All Started with a Little Lie: Making Pretty Little Liars - The making of Pretty Little Liars; Little Secrets from the Set - The cast and crew reveal some juicy behind-the-scenes secrets from the Pretty Little Liars set
Release dates			Deleted scenes: Episodes: 2, 3, 5, 8, 12, 13, 14, 16, 19; Pretty Little Liars: Two Truths and a Lie - The girls take turns revealing three things about themselves, not all of the true.; It All Started with a Little Lie: Making Pretty Little Liars - The making of Pretty Little Liars; Little Secrets from the Set - The cast and crew reveal some juicy behind-the-scenes secrets from the Pretty Little Liars set
United States	United Kingdom	Australia	Deleted scenes: Episodes: 2, 3, 5, 8, 12, 13, 14, 16, 19; Pretty Little Liars: Two Truths and a Lie - The girls take turns revealing three things about themselves, not all of the true.; It All Started with a Little Lie: Making Pretty Little Liars - The making of Pretty Little Liars; Little Secrets from the Set - The cast and crew reveal some juicy behind-the-scenes secrets from the Pretty Little Liars set
June 7, 2011	September 24, 2012	November 2, 2011	Deleted scenes: Episodes: 2, 3, 5, 8, 12, 13, 14, 16, 19; Pretty Little Liars: Two Truths and a Lie - The girls take turns revealing three things about themselves, not all of the true.; It All Started with a Little Lie: Making Pretty Little Liars - The making of Pretty Little Liars; Little Secrets from the Set - The cast and crew reveal some juicy behind-the-scenes secrets from the Pretty Little Liars set
