= Immortal (J. Cole song) =

Song by J. Cole

from the album 4 Your Eyez Only
- Released: December 9, 2016
- Recorded: 2016
- Genre: Hip hop
- Length: 3:20
- Label: Dreamville; Roc Nation; Interscope
- Songwriter(s): Jermaine Cole
- Producer(s): Cardiak; Frank Dukes

"Immortal" is a song by American rapper J. Cole, released on December 9, 2016 from his fourth studio album, 4 Your Eyez Only.

== Background ==
The song was recorded at the Sheltuh in North Carolina and Electric Lady Studios in New York City. The song was produced by Cardiak, Frank Dukes with additional production from J. Cole. "Immortal" also features background vocals from Kay Foxx.

== Critical reception ==
The track was generally well-received from critics. Paul A. Thompson of Pitchfork compared the song to 2Pac saying Cole "comes to life on “Immortal,” which sounds as if someone played Cole an unheard 2Pac song from the Makaveli sessions and then dared him to recreate it from memory. The song’s narrator feeds baggies through a burglar bar, watches Bic lighters wave under spoons, wakes up early to hit the Bowflex. It’s details like that last one that set “Immortal” apart from so much of Cole’s early work: you can see the speaker bathed in the artificial light of 3 a.m. infomercials, figuring he needs to put some weight on."

== Commercial performance ==
Upon its first week of release, "Immortal" debuted at number 11 on the US Billboard Hot 100, which marks as one of his highest charting positions to date, and at number 6 on the US Hot R&B/Hip-Hop Songs chart.

== Charts ==
Chart (2016)	Peak position
Australia (ARIA)	57
Canada (Canadian Hot 100)	12
New Zealand Heatseekers (RMNZ)	4
Sweden (Sverigetopplistan)	98
Switzerland (Schweizer Hitparade)	75
UK Singles (OCC)	49
US Billboard Hot 100	11
US Hot R&B/Hip-Hop Songs (Billboard)	6

== Certifications ==
Region	Certification	Certified units/sales
Australia (ARIA)	Platinum	70,000^{‡}
United Kingdom (BPI)	Silver	200,000^{‡}
United States (RIAA)	Platinum	1,000,000^{‡}
^{‡} Sales+streaming figures based on certification alone.
