= Deja Vu (J. Cole song) =

Single by J. Cole

from the album 4 Your Eyez Only
- Released: January 10, 2017
- Recorded: 2014–2016
- Genre: Hip hop
- Length: 4:26
- Label: Dreamville; Roc Nation; Interscope
- Songwriter: Jermaine Cole
- Producers: Vinylz; Boi-1da; Velous; J. Cole; Ron Gilmore

J. Cole singles chronology
"False Prophets" (2016)	"Deja Vu" (2017)	"High for Hours" (2017)

"Deja Vu" is a song by American rapper J. Cole, released on December 9, 2016 from his fourth studio album, 4 Your Eyez Only. It was released on January 10, 2017, as the first single off the album.

== Background ==
The song was written by Jermaine Cole and produced by Vinylz, Boi-1da, and Velous with additional production from Cole, Ron Gilmore. "Deja Vu" contains samples of "Swing My Way" performed by K. P. & Envyi.

== Controversy ==
On December 9, 2016, producers Vinylz and Boi-1da accused producer Foreign Teck of stealing their beat, to Cole's track "Deja Vu" and giving it to singer Bryson Tiller for his hit record "Exchange", explaining why the tracks share similarities. Vinylz said Cole's track was recorded before Tiller's, and that he sent Foreign Teck a video of him making the beat to "Deja Vu", and a week later Teck posted a beat on Instagram with the same drums. Vinylz also alleged that Foreign Teck offered him publishing, a tacit admission that he had reverse engineered the beat. In an interview with Billboard, Cole's manager and Dreamville President Ibrahim Hamad revealed that "Deja Vu" was originally intended for Cole's previous album, 2014 Forest Hills Drive.

== Commercial performance ==
"Deja Vu" became one of J. Cole's highest-debuting and highest-charting songs. The song debuted and peaked at number seven on the US Billboard Hot 100.

== Charts ==
=== Weekly charts ===
Chart (2016–2017)	Peak position
Australia (ARIA)	45
Belgium (Ultratip Bubbling Under Flanders)	39
Canada Hot 100 (Billboard)	7
Netherlands (Single Top 100)	69
New Zealand Heatseekers (RMNZ)	2
Sweden (Sverigetopplistan)	50
Switzerland (Schweizer Hitparade)	46
UK Singles (OCC)	30
US Billboard Hot 100	7
US Hot R&B/Hip-Hop Songs (Billboard)	4
US R&B/Hip-Hop Airplay (Billboard)	4
US Rhythmic Airplay (Billboard)	9

=== Year-end charts ===
Chart (2017)	Position
US Hot R&B/Hip-Hop Songs (Billboard)	51

== Certifications ==
Region	Certification	Certified units/sales
Australia (ARIA)	2× Platinum	140,000^{‡}
Portugal (AFP)	Gold	5,000^{‡}
United Kingdom (BPI)	Gold	400,000^{‡}
United States (RIAA)	3× Platinum	3,000,000^{‡}
^{‡} Sales+streaming figures based on certification alone.
