= Change (J. Cole song) =

Song by J. Cole

from the album 4 Your Eyez Only
- Released: December 9, 2016
- Recorded: 2016
- Genre: Conscious hip hop; jazz rap
- Length: 5:31
- Label: Dreamville; Roc Nation; Interscope
- Songwriter: Jermaine Cole
- Producers: J. Cole; Ron Gilmore

"Change" is a song by American rapper J. Cole, released on December 9, 2016 from his fourth studio album, 4 Your Eyez Only.

== Background ==
"Change" was recorded at the Sheltuh in North Carolina and Electric Lady Studios in New York City. The song was produced by Cole himself, with additional production from Ron Gilmore, and additional arrangement by Elite. The song also features background vocals from Dreamville signee, Ari Lennox. It also features samples from J Dilla's song, "African Rhythms". The narrative follows the story of Cole's friend who was killed at the age of 22. In the track, Cole identifies the man as James McMillan Jr., however the Dreamville team has confirmed that the storyline is about a real friend of Cole’s, but says the Fayetteville artist changed the name for the sake of privacy.

== Critical reception ==
The song was generally well-received from critics. Jon Caramanica from The New York Times said "“Change” is the only ill-fitting inclusion — which is marked by a carefully calibrated arrangement of quiet but tense drums, muted horns, searching strings and piano that strikes quick and deep." The National commented on the track saying "he narrates the final moments in the life of James McMillan Jr, killed at the age of 22. The fragility of life – particularly that of young black men too often felled by violence – shapes the frustration and desperation that permeates the album."

== Commercial performance ==
Upon its first week of release, "Change" debuted at number 21 on the US Billboard Hot 100, and at number 11 on the US Hot R&B/Hip-Hop Songs chart.

== Charts ==
Chart (2016)	Peak position
US Billboard Hot 100	21
US Hot R&B/Hip-Hop Songs (Billboard)	11

== Certifications ==
Region	Certification	Certified units/sales
Australia (ARIA)	Gold	35,000^{‡}
United States (RIAA)	Platinum	1,000,000^{‡}
^{‡} Sales+streaming figures based on certification alone.
