= For Whom the Bell Tolls (J. Cole song) =

Song by J. Cole

from the album 4 Your Eyez Only
- Released: December 9, 2016
- Recorded: 2016
- Genre: Hip hop
- Length: 2:08
- Label: Dreamville; Roc Nation; Interscope
- Songwriter(s): Jermaine Cole
- Producer(s): Elijah Scarlett; J. Cole

"For Whom the Bell Tolls" is a song by American rapper J. Cole from his fourth studio album 4 Your Eyez Only (2016). It was written by Cole with production by Cole and Elijah Scarlett. It contains an interpolation from "Divine", written by Aknostra and Tiad Hilm, as performed by Tiad Hilm.

The song was recorded at the Sheltuh in North Carolina and Electric Lady Studios in New York City. Commercially, the song peaked at number 23 on the Billboard Hot 100 in the United States, peaked just outside the top ten on the Hot R&B/Hip-Hop Songs chart, and reached the top 30 in 20 other countries.

== Background ==
The title of the song references the 1940 novel For Whom the Bell Tolls by Ernest Hemingway. The novel tells the story of Robert Jordan, a young American engaged in guerrilla warfare during the Spanish Civil War. The novel focuses on themes of death and suicide. "For Whom the Bell Tolls" also features background vocals from Kay Foxx.

== Commercial performance ==
Upon its first week of release, "For Whom the Bell Tolls" debuted at number 23 on the US Billboard Hot 100, and number 13 on the US Hot R&B/Hip-Hop Songs chart. Outside the United States, "For Whom the Bell Tolls" reached the top 30 in Canada and the top 20 in the United Kingdom.

== Charts ==
Chart (2016)	Peak position
Canada (Canadian Hot 100)	30
UK Singles (OCC)	82
US Billboard Hot 100	23
US Hot R&B/Hip-Hop Songs (Billboard)	13

== Personnel ==
- J. Cole – lead vocals, additional production
- Elijah Scarlett – Production
- Juro “Mez” Davis – Recording Engineer
- Kay Foxx – Background Vocals
- Gosha Usov – Assistant Engineers
- Beatriz Artola – Assistant Engineers
- CharGaux – String Arrangement
- Nico Segal – Horn Arrangement
- Anthony Ware – Additional Horns
- Theo Croker – Additional Horns
- Nate Fox – Additional Musical Arrangement
- Peter Cottontale – Additional Musical Arrangement
