= Chaka Pilgrim =

American music executive

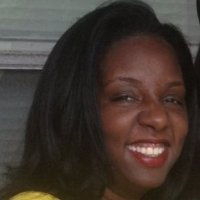
Chaka Pilgrim

Chaka Pilgrim is a music industry executive who is most well known as the former president of Roc Nation Records. Roc Nation consists of both management and label clients, many of whom Pilgrim has helped from the beginning of their careers. Some of the notable artists she has worked with include Big Sean, Rihanna, Kanye West, J. Cole, Jay Electronica, Meek Mill, and Jay-Z. Besides being a veteran music executive, Pilgrim has also been a key player in TV and film. Early in her career, she served as a producer for many well-known classic African-American movies, such as Streets is Watching, State Property and Paid in Full.

In the past, Pilgrim has held positions at Roc-A-Fella Records, Island Def Jam, Atlantic Records, and Virgin Records. She also serves as an independent marketing consultant at her company, Chakaworks. As of 2018, Pilgrim is the head of film and television for Shawn Carter Enterprises.

== 4:44 Album ==
Pilgrim, who has been involved with Jay Z's career since the 1990s, is credited as a creator, producer, and executive producer for Jay-Z's 4:44 album visuals, including "BAM," "4:44," and "Moonlight." "BAM," released on July 14, 2017, featured Damian Marley and was directed by Rohan Blair-Mangat and filmed in Jamaica. "Moonlight," released on August 4, 2017, was directed by Alan Yang and featured an all-star cast including Lil Rey Howery, Lakeith Stanfield, Jerrod Carmichael, Issa Rae, Tiffany Haddish, Tessa Thompson, and Hannibal Buress. "MaNyfaCedGod," released on August 11, 2017, featured Lupita Nyong'o and was directed by Francesco Carrozzini. Pilgrim was nominated for a Grammy Award for her work as a video producer for "The Story of O.J." at the 60th Grammys.

== Speaker ==
Pilgrim has been a featured speaker and interviewee at a number of events including panels and podcasts. On September 21, 2017, Pilgrim was a panelist at the Will and Jada Smith Family Foundation annual Careers in Entertainment Tour (CIE) alongside Leona Lewis, Regina Hall, and Jussie Smollett. The event hosted approximately 600 youth from NYC Public Schools and colleges who gained an insightful perspective of alternative careers within the entertainment industry through professionals including talent, authors, activists, executives, producers, and educators. In April 2017, Pilgrim was interviewed by TT Torez on Hot 97 for the #GoGetHers series. On July 26, 2017, Pilgrim was the only woman to be featured on ItsTheReal's live edition of their "A Waste of Time" podcast celebrating Roc-a-fella alongside Kareem "Biggs" Burke, Kyambo "Hip-Hop" Joshua, Lenny S, Young Guru, Just Blaze, Freeway, Young Chris, Neef Buck, and Jim Jones. Pilgrim was a featured speaker at the ATT-sponsored Black Enterprise Women of Power Summit 2018.

== Other activities and personal life ==
Pilgrim has also been involved with a number of philanthropic causes. She is a board member of the Shawn Carter Scholarship Foundation, and served as a founding board member of both the Summit Academy Charter School and the Museum of Contemporary African Diasporan Art.

Pilgrim currently resides in Brooklyn, New York.
