= For Whom the Bell Tolls (Pretty Little Liars) =

- Pretty Little Liars episode
- Episode no.: Season 1 Episode 22
- Directed by: Lesli Linka Glatter
- Written by: I. Marlene King
- Cinematography by: Dana Gonzales
- Editing by: Michael S. Murphy
- Original air date: March 21, 2011
- Running time: 43 minutes

Guest appearances
- Keegan Allen as Toby Cavanaugh; Tyler Blackburn as Caleb Rivers; Brant Daugherty as Noel Kahn; Torrey DeVitto as Melissa Hastings; Lesley Fera as Veronica Hastings; Yani Gellman as Officer Garrett Reynolds; Paloma Guzmán as Jackie Molina; Tilky Jones as Logan Reed; Ryan Merriman as Ian Thomas; Janel Parrish as Mona Vanderwaal; Andres Perez-Molina as Policeman; Brendan Robinson as Lucas Gottesman; Tammin Sursok as Jenna Marshall; Jim Titus as Officer Barry Maple

Episode chronology
← Previous "Monsters in the End"	Next → "It's Alive"
- Pretty Little Liars season 1

"For Whom the Bell Tolls" is the season finale of the first season of the American mystery-drama series Pretty Little Liars, based on the novels written by Sara Shepard, and the twenty-second episode of the series overall. It originally aired on ABC Family in the United States on March 21, 2011. The episode was directed by Lesli Linka Glatter and written by I. Marlene King.

In the episode, the girls plan to expose Ian as Alison's murderer after finding video files of them changing in their rooms. Meanwhile, each of the girls deals with setbacks in her personal life. The episode drew 3.64 million viewers, garnering a 1.3 rating in the 18–49 demographic. It ranks as the season's second-highest-rated episode. The episode has also garnered positive reviews from critics, many who offered praise to Brendan Robinson's character, Lucas Gottesman.

== Plot ==
Spencer (Troian Bellisario), Hanna (Ashley Benson), Aria (Lucy Hale), and Emily (Shay Mitchell) watch Ian's (Ryan Merriman) videos on the flash drive they recovered from the storage unit, which feature them, Alison (Sasha Pieterse), Jenna (Tammin Sursok) and Toby (Keegan Allen) being unknowingly filmed. The girls confront Jenna about the video of her and Toby. She tells them of the day Alison came to visit her in the hospital and how she threatened her with the video. The girls promise to keep the videos safe in exchange for the information. They later conclude that Jenna felt safe to return to Rosewood after Alison disappeared. The girls then plot to expose Ian, using a burner phone to send text messages demanding money in exchange for the videos.

In the girls daily lives, Hanna is still reeling from her breakup with Caleb, while Mona (Janel Parrish) covers her tracks after destroying Caleb's letter. Lucas (Brendan Robinson) catches on and brings Caleb (Tyler Blackburn) back to Rosewood. Spencer has issues with Melissa and Ian's pregnancy. Aria and Ezra celebrate as Ezra finalizes his transfer to Hollis, but his ex-fiancé (Paloma Guzman) appears at the Montgomery house, furthering Aria's suspicions about their previous relationship. Emily learns that she and her mother are moving to Texas to be with her father.

Hanna, Aria, and Emily meet at Willow Park with Officer Garret Reynolds (Yani Gellman) to corner Ian. They instead encounter a messenger (Tilky Jones) sent to deliver the demanded money. Meanwhile, Spencer drives her sister from the church but they get into a crash. She leaves the hospital, going back to the church to retrieve Melissa's (Torrey DeVitto) phone where she is cornered by Ian. He chases her up to the bell tower and tries to throw her off, saying that he planned out her suicide. However, a mysterious figure in a black hoodie appears and knocks Ian off the bell tower into the ropes, strangling him and saving Spencer. The police arrive at the scene to inspect the tower, but do not find Ian's body. The girls receive a text from “A” saying, “It's not over until I say it is. Sleep tight while you still can, bitches. –A”

== Production ==
“For Whom the Bell Tolls" was directed by Lesli Linka Glatter and written by I. Marlene King. The episode is the fifth writing credit for King. The episode also serves as the second directing credit for Glatter, after the pilot episode.

== Reception ==
=== Ratings ===
“For Whom the Bell Tolls” premiered on ABC Family on March 21, 2011, and was viewed by 3.64 million people. It garnered a 1.3 rating in the 18-49 age demographic, translating to 1.7 million viewers and a 0.2 ratings increase compared to the previous episode. The episode stands as the fourth highest viewed episode behind the season two episodes “It’s Alive” and “unmAsked” and the season one episode “Moments Later”.

=== Reviews ===
Carrie Raisler of The A.V. Club gave the episode a B−, praising it as “much stronger than the season as a whole”, while also calling it the “most confusing episode of television.” Tierney Bricker of Zap2it highlighted Spencer's intellectual prowess in the episode as one of the best moments and commented “You know you've just watched a good season finale when you have said the phrase "Oh my god!" over five times. We said it about 10 times during "Pretty Little Liars" Season 1 finale.” Teresa Lopez of TV Fanatic praised Brendan Robinson’s character for bringing Caleb back to Rosewood and called the episode ‘‘entertaining, although somewhat unsatisfying.”
