= Roc Nation singles discography =

Singles released under the Roc Nation record label

- Jay-Z Singles, collaborative singles & charted songs: 18
- J. Cole Singles & charted songs: 35
- Alexis Jordan Singles: 3
- Willow Smith Singles: 4
- Rita Ora Singles: 3
- Rihanna Singles: 3

The discography of Roc Nation, an American company and record label, consists of five singles, four collaborative singles and eight charted songs by Jay-Z, four by J. Cole, three by Alexis Jordan, ten (four official) by Willow Smith and three by Rita Ora.

== Jay-Z ==
=== Singles ===
List of singles, with selected chart positions, sales figures and certifications, showing year released and album name
| Single | Year | Peak chart positions (Note: Although the US Billboard Hot 100 and Hot R&B/Hip-Hop Songs charts both comprise up to a hundred songs, the Bubbling Under Hot 100 Singles and Bubbling Under R&B/Hip-Hop Singles act as 25-song extensions to each chart. Thus, songs that have peaked up to these extension charts are listed in this discography under the Hot 100 and Hot R&B/Hip-Hop Songs with values over a hundred. To search for songs that charted on the Bubbling Under charts, use this search page and look up exact chart positions on this address: http://api.billboard.com/apisvc/chart/v1/list?artist=Jay-Z&song=[title]&sdate=[start date yyyy-mm-dd]&edate=[end date yyyy-mm-dd]&api_key=bvk4re5h37dzvx87h7rf5dqz) | | | | | | | | | | Certification | Sales | Album |
| Single | Year | US | US R&B | US Rap | AUS | CAN | FRA | GER | IRE | NZ | UK | Certification | Sales | Album |
|---|---|---|---|---|---|---|---|---|---|---|---|---|---|---|
| "D.O.A. (Death of Auto-Tune)" | 2009 | 24 | 43 | 15 | — | — | — | — | — | — | 79 | — | — | The Blueprint 3 |
| "Run This Town" (featuring Kanye West and Rihanna) | 2009 | 2 | 3 | 1 | 9 | 6 | — | 17 | 3 | 9 | 1 | US: 2× Platinum; AUS: Platinum; NZ: Gold | | The Blueprint 3 |
| "Empire State of Mind" (featuring Alicia Keys) | 2009 | 1 | 1 | 1 | 4 | 3 | 8 | 11 | 2 | 6 | 2 | US: 3× Platinum; AUS: 3× Platinum; NZ: Platinum | | The Blueprint 3 |
| "On to the Next One" (featuring Swizz Beatz) | 2009 | 37 | 9 | 5 | — | 58 | — | — | — | — | 38 | — | — | The Blueprint 3 |
| "Young Forever" (featuring Mr. Hudson) | 2010 | 10 | 86 | 16 | 28 | 21 | — | — | 11 | 32 | 10 | — | — | The Blueprint 3 |
"—" denotes releases that did not chart, was not released in that territory or receive certification, and sales figures are unknown.

=== Collaborative singles ===
List of singles, with selected chart positions, showing year released and album name
| Single | Year | Peak chart positions | | | | | | Album |
| Single | Year | US | US R&B | US Rap | UK | AUS | CAN | Album |
|---|---|---|---|---|---|---|---|---|
| "H•A•M" (featuring Kanye West) | 2011 | 23 | 24 | 15 | 30 | 78 | 47 | Watch the Throne |
| "Otis" (with Kanye West, featuring Otis Redding) | 2011 | 12 | 2 | 2 | 28 | 42 | 37 | Watch the Throne |
| "Lift Off" (with Kanye West, featuring Beyoncé) | 2011 | 121 | — | — | 48 | 89 | — | Watch the Throne |
| "Niggas in Paris" (with Kanye West) | 2011 | 5 | 1 | 1 | — | — | — | Watch the Throne |
| "Holy Grail" (featuring Justin Timberlake) | 2013 | 4 | 2 | 1 | 7 | 19 | 13 | Magna Carta Holy Grail |
"—" denotes releases that did not chart.

=== Other charted songs ===
List of other charted songs, with selected chart positions, showing year released and album name
| Single | Year | Peak chart positions | | Album |
| Single | Year | US | US R&B | Album |
|---|---|---|---|---|
| "What We Talkin' About" (featuring Luke Steele) | 2009 | 106 | — | The Blueprint 3 |
| "Real as It Gets" (featuring Young Jeezy) | 2009 | — | 82 | The Blueprint 3 |
| "Off That" (featuring Drake) | 2009 | — | 112 | The Blueprint 3 |
| "A Star Is Born" (featuring J. Cole) | 2009 | — | 91 | The Blueprint 3 |
| "Venus vs. Mars" | 2009 | — | 90 | The Blueprint 3 |
| "Who Gon Stop Me" (with Kanye West) | 2011 | 44 | — | Watch the Throne |
| "Illest Motherfucker Alive" (with Kanye West) | 2011 | 104 | — | Watch the Throne |
| "No Church in the Wild" (with Kanye West featuring Frank Ocean) | 2011 | 120 | 104 | Watch the Throne |
| "Glory" (featuring B.I.C.) | 2012 | — | 63 | Non-album single |
| "Tom Ford" | 2013 | 39 | 11 | Magna Carta Holy Grail |
| "FuckWithMeYouKnowIGotIt" (featuring Rick Ross) | 2013 | 64 | 24 | Magna Carta Holy Grail |
| "Part II (On the Run)" (featuring Beyoncé) | 2013 | 81 | 29 | Magna Carta Holy Grail |
| "Oceans" (featuring Frank Ocean) | 2013 | 83 | 30 | Magna Carta Holy Grail |
| "Picasso Baby" | 2013 | 91 | 34 | Magna Carta Holy Grail |
| "Crown" | 2013 | 100 | 38 | Magna Carta Holy Grail |
| "Somewhere in America" | 2013 | 102 | 43 | Magna Carta Holy Grail |
| "F.U.T.W." | 2013 | 109 | 45 | Magna Carta Holy Grail |
| "Heaven" | 2013 | 110 | 46 | Magna Carta Holy Grail |
"—" denotes releases that did not chart.

== J. Cole ==
=== Singles ===
List of singles, with selected chart positions, sales figures and certifications, showing year released and album name
| Single | Year | Peak chart positions | | | Certification | Sales | Album |
| Single | Year | US | US R&B | US Rap | Certification | Sales | Album |
|---|---|---|---|---|---|---|---|
| "Who Dat" | 2010 | 93 | 32 | 19 | — | — | Cole World: The Sideline Story |
| "Work Out" | 2011 | 13 | 10 | 3 | * US: Platinum | | Cole World: The Sideline Story |
| "Can't Get Enough" (featuring Trey Songz) | 2011 | 52 | 7 | 7 | * US: Gold | — | Cole World: The Sideline Story |
| "Nobody's Perfect" (featuring Missy Elliott) | 2012 | 71 | 3 | 4 | — | — | Cole World: The Sideline Story |
| "Power Trip" (featuring Miguel) | 2013 | 20 | 5 | 3 | * US: Gold | 500,000 | Born Sinner |
| "Crooked Smile" (featuring TLC) | 2013 | 66 | 21 | 16 | — | — | Born Sinner |
"—" denotes releases that did not chart, was not released in that territory or receive certification, and sales figures are unknown.

=== Other charted songs ===
List of songs, with selected chart positions, showing year released and album name
| Single | Year | Peak chart positions | | Album |
| Single | Year | US | US R&B | Album |
|---|---|---|---|---|
| "Lights Please" | 2009 | — | — | The Warm Up |
| "A Star Is Born" (Jay-Z featuring J. Cole) | 2009 | — | 91 | The Blueprint 3 |
| "In the Morning" (featuring Drake) | 2011 | 117 | 57 | Friday Night Lights / Cole World: The Sideline Story |
| "Mr. Nice Watch" (featuring Jay-Z) | 2011 | 119 | 87 | Cole World: The Sideline Story |
| "Miss America" | 2012 | 120 | 34 | Born Sinner (Truly Yours 3 deluxe edition) |
| "Forbidden Fruit" (featuring Kendrick Lamar) | 2013 | — | 46 | Born Sinner |
| "Villuminati" | 2013 | — | 51 | Born Sinner |
| "Born Sinner" (featuring James Fauntleroy) | 2013 | — | 53 | Born Sinner |
| "Let Nas Down" | 2013 | — | 55 | Born Sinner |
| "Rich Niggaz" | 2013 | — | 60 | Born Sinner |
| "She Knows" (featuring Amber Coffman) | 2013 | — | 56 | Born Sinner |
"—" denotes releases that did not chart.

== Alexis Jordan ==
=== Singles ===
List of singles, with selected chart positions, sales figures and certifications, showing year released and album name
| Single | Year | Peak chart positions | | | | | | | | | | Certification | Sales | Album |
| Single | Year | AUS | BEL (FLA) | IRE | NL | NOR | NZ | POL | SWI | UK | US Dance | Certification | Sales | Album |
|---|---|---|---|---|---|---|---|---|---|---|---|---|---|---|
| "Happiness" | 2010 | 3 | 3 | 31 | 1 | 1 | 8 | 2 | 44 | 3 | 1 | AUS: 3× Platinum; BEL: Gold; NZ: Gold | | Alexis Jordan |
| "Good Girl" | 2011 | 40 | 9 | 15 | 25 | — | — | 42 | — | 6 | 1 | — | — | Alexis Jordan |
| "Hush Hush" | 2011 | — | — | 36 | 12 | — | — | 50 | — | 66 | — | — | — | Alexis Jordan |
"—" denotes releases that did not chart, was not released in that territory or receive certification, and sales figures are unknown.

== Willow Smith ==
=== Singles ===
List of singles, with selected chart positions and certifications, showing year released and album name
| Title | Year | Peak chart positions | | | | | | | | | | Certifications | Album |
| Title | Year | US | US R&B | AUS | AUT | CAN | DEN | GER | IRE | NZ | UK | Certifications | Album |
|---|---|---|---|---|---|---|---|---|---|---|---|---|---|
| "Whip My Hair" | 2010 | 11 | 5 | 18 | 2 | 18 | 9 | 44 | 11 | 16 | 2 | RIAA: Platinum; ARIA: Platinum; BPI: Silver; MC: Gold | Knees and Elbows (never released) |
| "21st Century Girl" | 2011 | 99 | — | — | — | — | — | — | 16 | — | 11 | | Knees and Elbows (never released) |
| "Fireball" (featuring Nicki Minaj) | 2011 | | 124 | — | — | — | — | — | — | — | — | | Knees and Elbows (never released) |
| "I Am Me" | 2012 | — | — | — | — | — | — | — | — | — | — | | Knees and Elbows (never released) |
| "Sugar and Spice" | 2013 | — | — | — | — | — | — | — | — | — | — | | Knees and Elbows (never released) |
| "Drowning" | 2013 | — | — | — | — | — | — | — | — | — | — | | Non-album single |
| "5" (featuring Jaden Smith) | 2014 | — | — | — | — | — | — | — | — | — | — | | 3 |
| "8" | 2014 | — | — | — | — | — | — | — | — | — | — | | "Love The Free Vol II" |
| "Easy Easy (King Krule cover)" | 2014 | — | — | — | — | — | — | — | — | — | — | | Non-album singles |
| "Your Love V2" | 2014 | — | — | — | — | — | — | — | — | — | — | | Non-album singles |
"—" denotes a title that did not chart, or was not released in that territory.

== Rita Ora ==
=== Singles ===
| Title | Year | Peak chart positions | | | | | | | | | | | Certifications | Album |
| Title | Year | UK | AUS | AUT | BEL (FL) | CAN | DEN | GER | IRL | NZ | SWI | US | Certifications | Album |
|---|---|---|---|---|---|---|---|---|---|---|---|---|---|---|
| "How We Do (Party)" | 2012 | 1 | 9 | 35 | 18 | 68 | 40 | 40 | 1 | 5 | 41 | 62 | BPI: Gold; ARIA: 2× Platinum; RMNZ: Gold | Ora |
| "R.I.P." (featuring Tinie Tempah) | 2012 | 1 | 10 | 51 | 44 | — | 26 | 36 | 11 | 28 | 46 | — (Note: "R.I.P." did not enter the Billboard Hot 100, but peaked at number three on the Bubbling Under Hot 100 Singles chart.) | BPI: Gold; ARIA: Platinum; IFPI DEN: Gold | Ora |
| "Shine Ya Light" | 2012 | 10 | — | — | — | — | — | — | 25 | — | — | — | | Ora |
| "Radioactive" | 2013 | 18 | 23 | — | 20 | — | — | — | 30 | — | — | — | ARIA: Gold | Ora |
| "I Will Never Let You Down" | 2014 | 1 | 5 | 15 | 12 | 62 | — | 23 | 9 | 9 | 12 | 77 | BPI: Gold; ARIA: Platinum; IFPI DEN: Gold; RMNZ: Gold | Non-album singles |
| "Poison" | 2015 | 3 | 30 | — | 45 | — | — | — | 18 | — | — | — | ARIA: Gold; BPI: Silver | Non-album singles |
| "Body on Me" (featuring Chris Brown) | 2015 | 22 | 66 | — | 55 | 91 | — | — | 54 | — (Note: "Body on Me" did not enter the NZ Top 40 Singles Chart, but peaked at number six on the NZ Heatseekers chart.) | — | — (Note: "Body on Me" did not enter the Billboard Hot 100, but peaked at number two on the Bubbling Under Hot 100 Singles chart.) | BPI: Silver | Non-album singles |
"—" denotes a recording that did not chart or was not released in that territory.

== Rihanna ==
=== Singles ===
List of singles as main artist, with selected chart positions and certifications
| Title | Year | Peak chart positions | | | | | | | | | | Certifications | Album |
| Title | Year | AUS | BEL (FL) | CAN | FRA | GER | IRL | NZ | SWI | UK | US | Certifications | Album |
|---|---|---|---|---|---|---|---|---|---|---|---|---|---|
| "FourFiveSeconds" (with Kanye West and Paul McCartney) | 2015 | 1 | 5 | 3 | 2 | 3 | 1 | 1 | 3 | 3 | 4 | ARIA: 2× Platinum; BPI: Gold; IFPI SWI: Gold; RMNZ: Platinum | Non-album single |
| "Towards the Sun" | 2015 | — | — (Note: "Towards the Sun" did not enter the Ultratop 50, but peaked at No. 56 on the Flemish Ultratip chart.) | — | 22 | — | — | — | — | 76 | — | | Home |
| "Bitch Better Have My Money" | 2015 | 14 | 27 | 11 | 3 | 17 | 32 | 10 | 7 | 27 | 15 | | Non-album singles |
| "American Oxygen" | 2015 | 65 | — (Note: "American Oxygen" did not enter the Ultratop 50, but peaked at No. 4 on the Flemish Ultratip chart.) | 59 | 25 | 39 | 33 | — | 30 | 71 | 78 | | Non-album singles |
| "Work" (featuring Drake) | 2016 | 10 | 12 | 1 | 1 | 6 | 5 | 3 | 9 | 2 | 1 | UK: Silver; Canada: Gold | Anti |
"—" denotes a recording that did not chart or was not released in that territory.

== See also ==
- Roc Nation albums discography
