= Bembeya Jazz National =

Guinean music group

Bembeya Jazz National (originally known as Orchestre de Beyla) is a Guinean music group formed in 1961 that gained fame in the 1960s for their Afropop rhythms. They are considered one of the most significant bands in Guinean music. Many of their recordings are based on traditional folk music from the country and have been fused with Cuban, jazz and Afropop styles. Featuring guitarist Sekou "Diamond Fingers" Diabaté, who grew up in a traditional griot musical family, the band won over fans in Conakry, Guinea's capital city, during the heady days of that country's newfound independence. Bembeya Jazz fell onto harder times in the 1980s and disbanded for a number of years, but reformed in the late 1990s and toured Europe and North America in the early 2000s.

== 1960s ==
In the aftermath of the Guinean Independence in 1958 and through the cultural policy of "authenticité", which encouraged cultural pride, numerous bands were created throughout the regions of Guinea. Guinea's President, Ahmed Sékou Touré, disbanded all private dance orchestras and replaced them with state-supported groups, such as Keletigui Et Ses Tambourinis and Balla et ses Balladins. The most popular was Bembeya Jazz National, formed in 1961.

Bembeya Jazz, also referred to as the Orchestre de Beyla in the early days, started as the regional orchestra from the town of Beyla in southern Guinea. They were formed with the help of the local governor, Emile Condé, to act as the region’s "orchestre moderne". The initial line up included Sékou Camara and Achken Kaba in the brass section on trumpets, Sékou Diabaté on guitar who was the youngest member at the time, Hamidou Diaouné on bass and Mory "Mangala" Condé on drums. Leo Sarkisian (who went on to join the Africa Service of the Voice of America in 1963) recorded Orchestre de Beyla in 1961 for the Hollywood based Tempo International label (Tempo 7015). The band were just being formed in Beyla and according to Sarkisian, called themselves Orchestra Bembeya, after a local river. The session also featured the female singer Jenne Camara as part of the band. The recording, one of ten Tempo LPs featuring a variety of Guinean music recorded by Sarkisian, was not released commercially. All 10 LPs were pressed in limited editions of 2,500 and released in 1962, but the majority of them were sent to the Guinean government. Bembeya's album was titled Sons nouveaux d'une nation nouvelle. République de Guinée. 2 Octobre 1962. 4ème anniversaire de l'independance nationale. Orchestre de Beyla and included the songs "Présentation", "Yarabi", "Lele", "Din ye kassila", "Wonkaha douba", "Seneiro", "Wassoulou" and "Maniamba".

They became better known as Bembeya Jazz after the release of their first album, and added singers Aboubacar Demba Camara and Salifou Kaba to the band.

Specializing in modern arrangements of Manding classic tunes, Bembeya Jazz National won first prize at two national arts festival's in 1964 and 1965 and were crowned "National Orchestra" in 1966.

Initially an acoustic group, featuring a Latin-flavored horn section of saxophone, trumpet, and clarinet, Bembeya Jazz National reached its apex with the addition of lead singer Aboubacar Demba Camara. The group toured widely, and became one of the most well-known groups in Africa. Among their biggest hits were the songs "Mami Wata" and "Armee Guineenne".

Bembeya Jazz National’s most ambitious album, Regard Sur Le Passe, released in 1968, was a musical tribute to the memory of Samory Touré, who founded a Mande state in much of what is now northern Guinea in 1870, and who became a nationalist emblem following 1958.

They released music exclusively on the Guinean Syliphone label until 1974.

== 1970s and 1980s ==
A live album, 10 Ans De Succes, was recorded during a 1971 concert, but a major set-back for the band came on April 5, 1973, when Demba Camara was killed in an auto accident on his way to a concert in Dakar. Although they remained together, Bembeya Jazz National was unable to duplicate the success of their earliest years. The group disbanded in 1991 with Sekou Diabaté and Sekouba Bambino Diabaté going on to successful solo careers.

== Reformation ==
The band reformed in the late 1990s. Bembeya Jazz came together again in 2002 to perform at the Musiques Metisses d’Angoulême world music festival in France. They remained there to record their first new album in 14 years for the director of the festival, Christian Mousset's Marabi label. The album, Bembeya, is a reworking of orchestra's greatest hits. They went on to tour Europe and North America.

In 2007 they were featured in the documentary film Sur les traces du Bembeya Jazz.

== Discography ==
Graeme Counsel, an Honorary Fellow in the Faculty of Music at the University of Melbourne, Australia has published a complete discography for Bembeya Jazz.

=== Tracks on Syliphone compilations ===
- The Syliphone Years (2009), Sterns Music

=== Various artist compilations ===
- Authenticite - The Syliphone Years (2008), Sterns Music
- Golden Afrique (2005), Network Germany

== Notes ==
- Roderic Knight. The Mande Sound: African Popular Music on Records. Ethnomusicology, Vol. 33, No. 2 (Spring–Summer 1989), pp. 371–376.
- Thomas O'Toole and Janice E. Baker. Historical dictionary of Guinea. 4th edition. Scarecrow Press (2005), ISBN 0-8108-4634-9 pp. 28–29.
- Interview: Eric Charry (on Bembeya Jazz). Afropop Worldwide. 2003. Accessed 2009-04-11.
- Sekouba "Bambino" and Guinée Conakry. Feature and photos by Martin Sinnock. Africasounds.com.
