= Syliphone =

Guinean record label

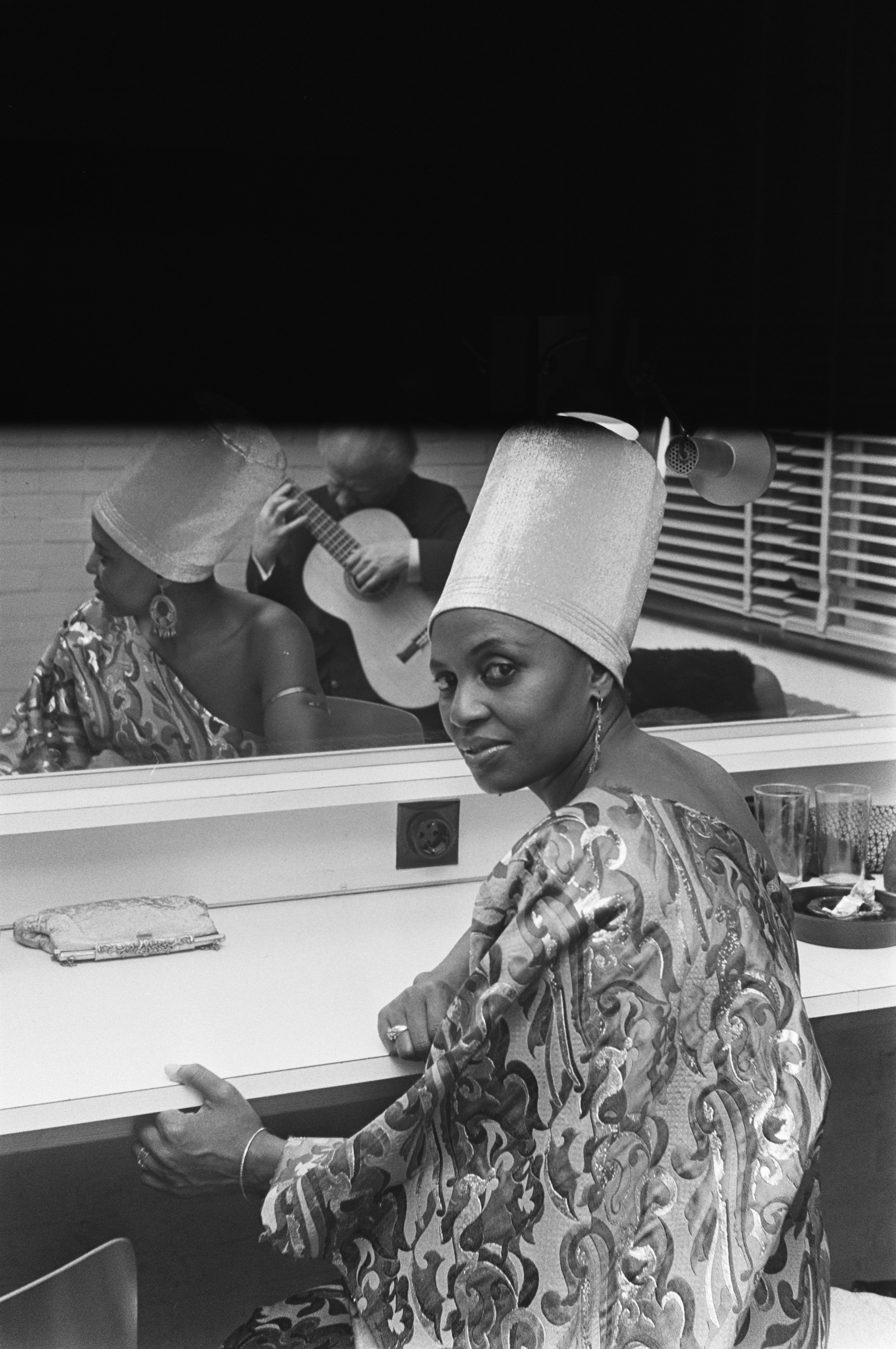
Grammy Award-winning Miriam Makeba released Appel A L'Afrique on Syliphone in 1971.

Syliphone was a Guinean record label that ran from 1967 until 1984. The label was based in Conakry, Guinea. Created and funded by the Guinean government, Syliphone was the first African record label to attain funding from the state within the post-colonial era. The music on the label has been described as representing "some of the most sublime and influential that any West African nation has ever produced." The dissolution of Syliphone came with the death of the first president of Guinea, Ahmed Sékou Touré, in 1984.

== Context and origins ==
On 28 September 1958, Guineans voted in a constitutional referendum on whether to adopt Charles de Gaulle's French Constitution of 1958, which proposed the formation of a new French Community. More than 95% of the votes were against the constitution. On 2 October 1958, Guinea became an independent nation, making it the first of the French colonies to attain independence.

With the new-found independence, the elected Guinean government headed by president Ahmed Sékou Touré to instil a sense of national identity by reigniting the arts and cultural practices of Guinea. Central to fulfilling these aims was the government's cultural policy of authenticité, which saw the creation of a network of arts troupes across the nation. These troupes, choirs, ensembles and orchestras—more than 250 in number—provided a comprehensive representation of Guinean musical styles and approaches. Guinean musicians were encouraged to create modern versions of the traditional songs of their respective regions and the authenticité policy produced many outstanding recordings. It influenced musical development and originality outside of Guinea, too, with Mali and Burkina Faso adopting similar programmes in the creation of their regional and national arts troupes and orchestras.

Formed in 1967, the Syliphone label became the central distributor of Guinean music, making it accessible to the general public across West Africa, and thus shaping the sound of African popular music from the 1960s to the 1980s and beyond.

== Musical style ==
In the early period of the label, modern orchestras were at the forefront of Syliphone and subsequently the authenticité cultural policy. Traditional songs were given a modern twist with the use of electric guitars and saxophones in replacement of the kora (instrument) and balafon. In the 1970s, the experimentation and creative approaches within the Syliphone sound developed and came of age. Musicians on the label began to tour Africa, Europe and USA, which gave Syliphone and the authenticité cultural policy international recognition and an international audience. Into the 1980s, Syliphone had released recordings of choirs, ensembles and solo artists on the label.

Graeme Counsel describes what made Syliphone stand out from other post-colonial African record labels: "A lot of care had gone into their production: the cover art was high quality glossy colour; the lyrics of the songs were often provided; the musicians were named; and lengthy annotations providing a musicological analysis were featured on many of the back covers. Another remarkable feature was the excellent quality of the audio. The sound engineer’s positioning of the microphones, the subtle use of echo effects, and the fidelity of the production were of the most exceptional standard when compared with recordings of a similar type. Such high quality audio captured Guinea’s musicians at their best, and they clearly rivalled, if not surpassed, the great singers and groups from neighbouring Mali and Senegal."

== The Syliphone Archive ==
In 2016, the entire Syliphone Archive was made available through The British Library. The Endangered Archives Programme facilitated the project and it was the first online sound initiative of the programme. The archive contains every release on the Syliphone label but also more tan 7,000 songs recorded in Guinea in the same studios and with the same engineers as Syliphone. From 2008 to 2013, the project holder Graeme Counsel oversaw the preservation and digitisation of Syliphone vinyl recordings and reel-to-reel tapes for the archive. The degradation threats and previous neglect of these two formats meant that the digitisation process was essential to preserve the recordings. Other threats to the archive were more overt, with Graeme Counsel noting that “the government's own archive of this collection was partially destroyed in the counter-coup of 1985, when artillery bombed the national broadcaster and home of the offices of the RTG."

Recordings in the collection can be listened to by all.

== Notable artists ==
- Balla et ses Balladins
- Bembeya Jazz National
- Bongi Makeba
- Franklin Boukaka
- Keletigui et ses Tambourinis
- Sory Kandia Kouyaté
- Les Ballets Africains
- Miriam Makeba
- Kébendo Jazz
- Les Amazones de Guinée
- Super Boiro Band
