= Can't Get Enough (J. Cole song) =

2011 single by J. Cole featuring Trey Songz

Single by J. Cole featuring Trey Songz

from the album Cole World: The Sideline Story
- Released: September 1, 2011
- Recorded: 2010
- Genre: Dirty rap; R&B
- Length: 3:45
- Label: Roc Nation; Columbia
- Songwriters: Jermaine Cole; Tremaine Neverson
- Producer: Brian Kidd

J. Cole singles chronology
"Only Wanna Give It to You" (2011)	"Can't Get Enough" (2011)	"Party" (2012)

Trey Songz singles chronology
"Take Off" (2011)	"Can't Get Enough" (2011)	"The Way You Move" (2011)

Music video
- "Can't Get Enough" on YouTube

"Can't Get Enough" is a song by American hip hop recording artist J. Cole, released as the fourth single off his debut studio album Cole World: The Sideline Story. It was released on September 2, 2011, through Roc Nation and Columbia. The song, featuring R&B singer Trey Songz, was produced by Brian Kidd and samples "Paulette" as performed by Balla et ses Balladins.

== Music video ==
The song's music video, filmed in Barbados, was directed by Clifton Bell. While in Barbados for his last performance as the official opening act for Rihanna's Loud Tour, Cole shot the video with Songz and Rihanna, who provided a cameo while in her hometown.

== Chart performance ==
The song first charted on the week of October 29, 2011 on the US Hot R&B/Hip-Hop Songs at number eighty-six. It peaked at number seven. On August 30, 2016, the single was certified platinum by the Recording Industry Association of America (RIAA) for sales of over a million digital copies in the United States.

== Charts ==
=== Weekly charts ===
Chart (2011–2012)	Peak position
UK Hip Hop/R&B (OCC)	40
US Billboard Hot 100	52
US Hot R&B/Hip-Hop Songs (Billboard)	7
US Hot Rap Songs (Billboard)	5
US Rhythmic Airplay (Billboard)	6

=== Year-end charts ===
Chart (2012)	position
US Hot R&B/Hip-Hop Songs (Billboard)	25
US Rhythmic (Billboard)	33

== Certifications ==
Region	Certification	Certified units/sales
New Zealand (RMNZ)	2× Platinum	60,000^{‡}
United States (RIAA)	Platinum	1,000,000^{*}
^{*} Sales figures based on certification alone.^{‡} Sales+streaming figures based on certification alone.

== Release history ==
Country	Date	Format	Label	Ref
United States	September 1, 2011	Digital download	Roc Nation	
United States	November 8, 2011	Urban airplay	Roc Nation	
United States	November 29, 2011	Rhythmic airplay	Roc Nation	
United States	March 27, 2012	Top 40/Mainstream airplay	Roc Nation	
