= Roc Nation albums discography =

- Jay-Z Studio albums, collaboration albums, compilation albums & mixtapes: 7
- J. Cole Studio albums & mixtapes: 8
- Willow Smith Studio albums, collaboration albums & extended plays: 6
- Jaden Smith Studio albums & mixtapes: 4
- Rihanna Studio albums & soundtrack albums: 3
- Jay Electronica Studio albums: 2
- Rita Ora Studio albums: 1

The albums discography of Roc Nation, an American company and record label, consists of three studio albums, one collaboration album, one compilation album and two mixtapes by Jay-Z, six studio albums and two mixtapes by J. Cole, five albums and one collaboration album by Willow Smith, three albums and one mixtape by Jaden Smith, one studio album and two soundtrack albums by Rihanna, two studio albums by Jay Electronica, one studio album by Rita Ora, one studio album by Alexis Jordan, one studio album by Hugo, and one studio album by Nicole Bus. Upcoming studio albums are also included.

== Jay-Z ==
=== Studio albums ===
List of studio albums, with selected chart positions, sales figures and certifications
Title	Album details	Peak chart positions										Certifications	Sales
Title	Album details	US	US R&B	CAN	FRA	GER	NLD	NOR	SWE	SWI	UK	Certifications	Sales
The Blueprint 3	Release: September 8, 2009; Label: Roc Nation; Formats: CD, LP, digital download	1	1	1	20	22	12	15	44	12	4	US: 2× Platinum; CAN: Platinum; FRA: Gold; IRE: Gold; UK: Platinum	US: 1,909,000
Magna Carta Holy Grail	Release: July 4, 2013 (Samsung exclusive) July 9, 2013 (Official release); Label: Roc Nation, Roc-A-Fella, Universal; Formats: CD, LP, cassette, digital download	1	1	1	12	9	7	2	8	1	1	CAN: Platinum; UK: Gold; US: 3× Platinum	US: 1,100,000
4:44	Release: June 20, 2017; Label: Roc Nation; Formats: CD, streaming, digital download	1	1	1	43	15	11	11	16	5	3	US: 2× Platinum	

=== Collaboration albums ===
List of collaboration albums, with selected chart positions and certifications
Title	Album details	Peak chart positions										Certifications
Title	Album details	US	US R&B	CAN	FRA	GER	NLD	NOR	SWE	SWI	UK	Certifications
Watch the Throne (with Kanye West)	Released: August 8, 2011; Label: Roc-A-Fella, Roc Nation, Def Jam; Formats: CD, LP, digital download	1	1	1	10	2	3	1	27	1	3	US: 5× Platinum; CAN: Platinum; UK: Platinum; ARIA: Gold

=== Compilation albums ===
List of compilation albums, with selected chart positions and certifications
Title	Album details	Peak chart positions						Certifications
Title	Album details	US	US R&B	GER	NOR	SWI	UK	Certifications
The Hits Collection, Volume One	Released: November 22, 2010; Label: Roc Nation, Def Jam, Roc-A-Fella; Formats: CD, LP, digital download	43	11	89	16	98	20	UK: Silver

== J. Cole ==
=== Studio albums ===
List of studio albums, with selected chart positions, sales figures and certifications
Title	Album details	Peak chart positions						Certifications
Title	Album details	US	US R&B	US Rap	CAN	AUS	UK	Certifications
Cole World: The Sideline Story	Released: September 27, 2011; Label: Roc Nation; Columbia; Format: CD; digital download	1	1	1	4	52	25	US: Platinum; UK: Gold
Born Sinner	Released: June 18, 2013; Label: Dreamville; Roc Nation; Columbia; Format: CD; digital download	1	1	1	2	14	7	US: 3× Platinum; UK: 2x Gold
2014 Forest Hills Drive	Released: December 9, 2014; Label: Dreamville; Roc Nation; Columbia; Formats: CD; digital download	1	1	1	3	40	33	US: 5× Platinum; UK: 3x Gold
4 Your Eyez Only	Released: December 9, 2016; Label: Dreamville; Roc Nation; Interscope; Formats: CD; streaming; digital download	1	1	1	1	6	21	US: 2× Platinum; UK: 2x Gold
KOD	Released: April 20, 2018; Label: Dreamville; Roc Nation; Interscope; Formats: CD; streaming; digital download	1	1	1	1	1	2	US: 2× Platinum; UK: 2x Gold
The Off-Season	Released: May 14, 2021; Label: Dreamville; Roc Nation; Interscope; Formats: CD; streaming; digital download	1	1	1	1	3	2	US: Platinum; UK: 2x Gold

=== Mixtapes ===
List of mixtapes, with selected chart positions
Title	Album details	Peak chart positions								
Title	Album details	US	US R&B/HH	US Rap	AUS	BEL	CAN	NZ	SWI	UK
The Warm Up	Released: June 15, 2009; Label: Roc Nation; Formats: Digital download, streaming	159	—	—	—	—	—	—	—	—
Friday Night Lights	Released: November 12, 2010; Label: Roc Nation; Formats: Digital download, streaming	147	—	—	—	—	—	—	—	—

== Willow Smith ==
=== Studio albums ===
List of studio albums, with selected chart positions
Title	Album details	Peak chart positions				
Title	Album details	US	US Alt	US Indie	US Rock	SCO
Ardipithecus	Released: December 11, 2015; Label: Roc Nation, Interscope; Formats: Digital download, streaming	— (Note: Ardipithecus did not enter the US Billboard 200, but charted at number 15 on the US Heatseekers Albums chart.)	—	—	—	—
The 1st	Released: October 31, 2017; Label: Roc Nation; Formats: Digital download, streaming	—	—	—	—	—
Willow	Released: July 19, 2019; Label: Roc Nation, MSFTSMusic; Format: CD, LP, digital download, streaming	— (Note: Willow did not enter the US Billboard 200, but charted at number 22 on the US Heatseekers Albums chart.)	19	—	—	—
Lately I Feel Everything	Released: July 16, 2021; Label: Roc Nation, MSFTSMusic, Polydor; Format: CD, LP, cassette, digital download, streaming	46	5	6	10	84
Coping Mechanism	Released: October 7, 2022; Label: Roc Nation, MSFTSMusic; Format: Digital download, streaming	—	—	—	—	—

=== Collaborative albums ===
List of collaborative studio albums, with selected chart positions
Title	Album details	Peak chart positions				
Title	Album details	US	US Alt	US Indie	US Rock	CAN
The Anxiety (as The Anxiety with Tyler Cole)	Released: March 13, 2020; Label: Roc Nation, MSFTSMusic; Format: LP, digital download, streaming	103	11	13	17	77

== Jaden Smith ==
=== Studio albums ===
List of studio albums, with selected chart positions
Title	Album details	Peak chart positions										Certifications
Title	Album details	US	US R&B /HH	US Rap	AUS	BEL (FL)	CAN	FRA	NLD	NZ	UK	Certifications
Syre	Released: November 17, 2017; Label: MSFTSMusic, Roc Nation; Format: Vinyl, digital download, streaming	24	10	8	—	80	32	142	63	33	85	RIAA: Gold
Erys	Released: July 5, 2019; Label: MSFTSMusic, Roc Nation; Format: Vinyl, digital download, streaming	12	8	6	34	129	18	134	38	25	62	
CTV3: Cool Tape Vol. 3	Released: August 28, 2020; Label: MSFTSMusic, Roc Nation; Format: Digital download, streaming	44	—	25	—	153	55	141	—	—	—	
"—" denotes an album that did not chart or was not released in that territory.

=== Mixtapes ===
List of mixtapes, with selected chart positions
Title	Album details	Peak chart positions
Title	Album details	US
The Sunset Tapes: A Cool Tape Story	Released: November 17, 2018; Label: MSFTSMusic, Roc Nation; Format: Digital download	117

== Rihanna ==
=== Studio albums ===
List of studio albums, with selected chart positions, sales figures and certifications
Title	Album details	Peak chart positions				Certifications	Sales
Title	Album details	US	US R&B	CAN	UK	Certifications	Sales
Anti	Released: January 28, 2016; Label: Westbury Road, Roc Nation; Formats: CD, digital download	1	1	1	7	US: 6× Platinum	US: 700,000

=== Soundtrack albums ===
List of soundtrack albums, with selected chart positions
Title	Album details	Peak chart positions									
Title	Album details	AUS	BEL (FL)	CAN	FRA	GER	IRL	NZ	SWI	UK	US
Home (soundtrack) (with various artists)	Released: March 13, 2015 (US); Label: Westbury Road, Roc Nation; Formats: CD, LP, digital download, streaming	40	-	-	171	-	-	-	-	-	40
Black Panther: Wakanda Forever – Music from and Inspired By (with Tems and various artists)	Released: November 4, 2022 (US); Label: Roc Nation, Def Jam, Hollywood; Formats: CD, LP, digital download, streaming	79	50	7	47	73	2	17	31	3	12

== Jay Electronica ==
=== Studio albums ===
List of studio albums, with selected information
Title	Album details	Peak chart positions						
Title	Album details	US	US R&B	AUS	BEL (FL)	CAN	SWI	UK
A Written Testimony	Released: March 13, 2020; Label: Roc Nation; Formats: CD, LP, cassette, streaming, digital download	12	8	94	156	43	65	53
Act II: The Patents of Nobility (The Turn)	Released: October 5, 2020; Label: Roc Nation; Formats: LP, streaming, digital download	—	—	—	—	—	—	—

== Alexis Jordan ==
=== Studio albums ===
List of studio albums, with selected chart positions
Title	Album details	Peak chart positions					
Title	Album details	AUS	BEL (FLA)	IRE	NL	SWI	UK
Alexis Jordan	Released: February 25, 2011; Label: StarRoc, Roc Nation, Columbia; Formats: CD, digital download	11	87	28	21	96	9

== Rita Ora ==
=== Studio albums ===
List of studio albums, with selected chart positions
Title	Album details	Peak chart positions							
Title	Album details	UK	AUS	AUT	BEL (FL)	GER	IRL	NZ	SWI
Ora	Released: 27 August 2012; Label: Roc Nation, Columbia; Formats: CD, digital download	1	24	51	101	63	2	24	15

== Hugo ==
=== Studio albums ===
List of albums, with selected chart positions
Title	Album details	Peak chart positions				
Title	Album details	US	US R&B	CAN	AUS	UK
Old Tyme Religion	Released: May 10, 2011; Label: Roc Nation; Formats: CD, digital download	—	—	—	—	—
"—" denotes a release that did not chart or was not released in that territory.

== Nicole Bus ==
=== Studio albums ===
List of studio albums, with selected chart positions
Title	Album details	Peak chart positions				
Title	Album details	US	US R&B	CAN	AUS	UK
Kairos	Released: October 18, 2019; Label: Roc Nation; Formats: CD, digital download	—	—	—	—	—
"—" denotes a release that did not chart or was not released in that territory.

== See also ==
- Roc Nation singles discography
