= Djembé d'or =

Guinean music award

- Description: Annual award for outstanding Musicians in Guinea
- Country: Guinea
- Presented by: Jean-Baptiste Williams
- First award: 2000

The Djembé d’Or is a music award created in 2000, given formerly only to musicians from Guinea, later expanding to include artists from other African countries.

== History ==
The Djembé d'or has been held annually since 2000, and lasts three days.

=== Edition 2000 ===
The first edition awarded the best albums from 1990 to 2000, then the two next editions celebrated popular artists. Since 2004, the contest has begun to award Africans from other countries than Guinea.

=== Edition 2003 ===
For three days, Les Ballets Africains, griots, djembéfolas (renowned djembé players) and the stars of showbiz take turns se sont relayés sur la scène devant un parterre de 2 500 spectators, in the presence of the artists Alpha Wess, Sékouba Bambino for Guinea, Barbara Canam, Joëlle C for the Côte d'Ivoire, Alioune N'Der for Senegal and Solo Dja Kabako for Burkina Faso.

The discount of prices for the Palais du peuple de Conakry, took place in the presence of ambassador and ministers.

N°	Portrait	Laureate	Category
1	Artist	Sékouba Bambino Diabaté	Best Album 2002
2	Artist	Matavieux	Best Album 2003
3	Musical group	Espoirs de Coronthie	Best Album Traditional 2002
4	Artist	Doudou Benni	Best Album Traditional 2003
5	Artist	Kamaldine	Best Album Féminin 2002
6	Artist	Yarie Touré	Best Album Féminin 2003
7	Artist	Alpha Wess	Best rap or reggae Album 2002
8	Artist	Daddy Cool	Best rap or reggae Album 2003
9	Groupe de musique	Madada de Kamaldine	Best Vidéo-clip 2002
10	Artist	Batafon	Best Vidéo-clip 2003

Volet international

N°	Portrait	Lauréat	Category	Nationality
1	Artist	Youssou N'Dour	Best star of Senegal 2002 – 2003	Senegal
2	Artist	Salif Keita	Best star of Mali 2002 – 2003	Mali
3	Artist	Meiway	Best star of Côte d'Ivoire 2002 -2003	Côte d'Ivoire
4	Artist	Alan Cavé	Best Star of the Antilles 2002 – 2003	United States
5	Artist	Nelly	Best Rap Star USA 2002 – 2003	United States
