= The Rough Guide to Psychedelic Africa =

The Rough Guide To Psychedelic Africa

Compilation album by Various artists
- Released: 12 March 2012
- Genre: World, African pop, Psychedelic
- Length: 108:23
- Label: World Music Network

Full series chronology
The Rough Guide to African Roots Revival (2012)	The Rough Guide To Psychedelic Africa (2012)	The Rough Guide to Celtic Women (2012)

The Rough Guide To Psychedelic Africa is a world music compilation album originally released in 2012 featuring 1960s and 1970s African popular music. Part of the World Music Network Rough Guides series, the album contains two discs: an overview of the genre on Disc One, and a "bonus" Disc Two highlighting Victor Uwaifo. Disc One features three Nigerian tracks, two Guinean, and one each from Benin, Ethiopia, Tanzania, Senegal, Ghana, and Mali. The compilation was compiled by Dominic Raymond-Barker and Phil Stanton, co-founder of the World Music Network.

== Critical reception ==
Professional ratings
Review scores
Source	Rating
AllMusic	3/5 stars
Spin	6/10 stars

The album was met with mixed to positive reviews, with criticism focusing on the title. Chris Nickson of AllMusic called the use of the term "psychedelia" "elastic". Robin Denselow of The Guardian wrote in the same vein, saying it was "more good-time dance music than freak-out," while Richard Gehr of Spin said it was "less Hendrix than 'Mystic Moods'".

== Track listing ==
=== Disc One ===
No.	Title	Artist (Country)	Length
1.	"Let Yourself Go"	Victor Olaiya's All Stars Soul International (Nigeria)	2:09
2.	"Obialu Be Onye Abiagbunia Okwukwe"	Celestine Ukwu (Nigeria)	6:17
3.	"Pardon"	Orchestre Poly-Rythmo (Benin)	3:43
4.	"Kadia Blues"	Orchestre de la Paillote (Guinea)	5:00
5.	"Eruq Yalèshew"	Alèmayèhu Eshètè (Ethiopia)	3:34
6.	"Fadakudu"	Balla et ses Balladins (Guinea)	5:44
7.	"Taxi Driver"	Mlimani Park Orchestra (Tanzania)	6:24
8.	"Nijaay"	Orchestra Baobab (Senegal)	7:14
9.	"Nga Nga"	Ebo Taylor (Ghana)	5:25
10.	"Guitar Boy"	Victor Uwaifo (Nigeria)	5:43
11.	"Wale Numa Lombaliya"	Rail Band (Mali)	13:26

=== Disc Two ===
All tracks on Disc Two are performed by Victor Uwaifo.

No.	Title	Length
1.	"Ekassa 28"	5:21
2.	"Ekassa 34"	6:43
3.	"Ekassa 31"	3:59
4.	"Ekassa 32"	3:23
5.	"Ekassa 25"	2:31
6.	"Ekassa 38"	5:08
7.	"Ekassa 24"	4:01
8.	"Ekassa 26"	5:45
9.	"Ekassa 35"	3:47
10.	"Ekassa 29"	3:06
