= Cole World: The Sideline Story =

Studio album by J. Cole
- Released: September 27, 2011
- Recorded: 2007; 2009–2011
- Genre: Hip-hop
- Length: 57:43
- Labels: Roc Nation; ByStorm; Columbia; Sony
- Producers: Shawn "Jay-Z" Carter; Mark Pitts; J. Cole; Brian Kidd; Canei Finch; Capsvl; Cubic Z; Elite; L&X Music; No I.D.; Ron Gilmore

J. Cole chronology
| Friday Night Lights (2010) | Cole World: The Sideline Story (2011) | Truly Yours (2013) |

Singles from Cole World: The Sideline Story
- 1. "Work Out" Released: June 15, 2011; 2. "Can't Get Enough" Released: September 1, 2011; 3. "Mr. Nice Watch" Released: October 4, 2011; 4. "Nobody's Perfect" Released: February 7, 2012

Cole World: The Sideline Story (commonly shortened to Cole World or The Sideline Story; stylized as Cole World - The Sideline Story) is the debut studio album by American rapper J. Cole. It was released on September 27, 2011, by Roc Nation, ByStorm Entertainment and Columbia Records, with distribution from Sony Music. The album is his first studio release, following three successful mixtapes. In 2007, the album was first recorded and ended, and then began to take place from 2009 to early 2011, featuring the production that was handled mainly by Cole himself, with some production from high-profile producer No I.D. It includes four guest appearances from Trey Songz, Drake, Jay-Z and Missy Elliott.

The album debuted at number one on the US Billboard 200, with 218,000 copies sold in the first week following its release. The album has since been certified platinum by the Recording Industry Association of America (RIAA). As of December 2016, it sold 855,000 copies in the United States. The album was supported by three official singles: Work Out, Can't Get Enough and Nobody's Perfect.

The album was one of the most anticipated releases of 2011 due to the sharp rise in Cole's popularity and mainstream fan base. Cole's lyrics perhaps most strikingly deal with issues such as abortion and the consequences of growing up in a fatherless household. However, these themes are incorporated alongside more introspective issues such as relationships, family problems, fame and attempting to be successful – an area which very much links in with the subtitle of the album 'The Sideline Story'. Upon its release, the album was generally well received by critics, who praised the wholesomeness of the album.

== Background ==
On April 25, 2011, Vibe listed him at number five on their Vibe's list of Greatest Rappers Alive 30 Under 30. J. Cole was nominated for Best New Artist at the 2011 BET Awards. On May 3, 2011, Cole stated on Twitter, "All singles done. Album ridiculous. Title Perfect. Music incredible. Thank you for your patience. Let's change the game." On June 21, 2011, Cole tweeted, "Cole World: The Sideline Story," the album's title. He then tweeted "9/27," the release date. In June 2011, he announced that the recording of the album was finished, and that the release date is set for September later that year.

Cole said several of the tracks are songs that he held onto before he was signed. He said they were too good to give away on mixtapes. Cole stated that he had 16 tracks on the album, 12 of which he has produced himself. He also revealed that he would not release a pre-album mixtape like he previously stated. Instead, between July 31st and September 4th of 2011 he released songs that did not make the album alongside other material on the day Sunday. The campaign was titled Any Given Sunday.. There were five editions of Any Given Sunday released, although the third and fourth did not feature any music. Rather, the third was a livestream on the video platform Ustream where Cole played unreleased music and the fourth had him reveal the cover art to the album.. Cole said that the reason for the subtitle "The Sideline Story" is because he feels since being signed to Jay-Z it has been like someone being on the sidelines for their favorite basketball team, and they are just waiting until the coach puts them in.

== Recording and production ==
"Cole World" includes production from the rapper himself, alongside Brian Kidd, No I.D. and L&X Music. Prior to the album's publication, Cole expressed his desire for his fans to expect a different sound, while lyrically he said he tried to explore topics that are not frequent in mainstream hip hop music. The Source magazine said that Cole's "evolution as a producer solely enhances the product" and that "Outside of co-production from No I.D., this album is all Cole at his rawest. The album also features live Orchestra and Musical Sections arranged and produced by Larrance Dopson of 1500 or Nothin', with violin recorded by Ginny Luke on them songs, such as "Rise and Shine", "Lost Ones" and "Breakdown". During the final moments of working on his album, when Cole had lost hope for his dream collaboration with Jay-Z, he explained to Vibe how the collaboration came to fruition, "He was in L.A. and I got [there] that day around the VMAs or whatever. He actually pushed back the mastering, we went to mastering with no Jay-Z verse. I was like 'oh okay cool, I guess he can't do it.' They were mastering the last song, and this is such a Jay-Z move, he called in and stopped the mastering and pushed it back like a week. Only he can do that."

== Singles and other songs ==
The album's first intended single, called "Who Dat" was released on June 8, 2010. The song was produced by Cole and Elite. The song failed to garner J. Cole the attention needed to drop a major label debut, the song was thought not to have made the final cut due to the song being released sixteen months prior to the album's release and its lackluster performance on the charts: however, the song appears as a bonus track on the iTunes edition as well as Daddy's Little Girl. J. Cole explained he kept the song on the album and included it as a bonus track, because "[it] connects the past two years to everything." The song has since peaked at number 94 on the US Billboard Hot 100.

In honor of the second anniversary of his highly acclaimed mixtape The Warm Up, Cole released "Work Out" on June 15, 2011. "Work Out" has since been certified 2× platinum by the Recording Industry Association of America. The second single, "Can't Get Enough" originally leaked on the internet on July 26, 2011. Produced by Brian Kidd and featuring Trey Songz, the song was officially released on August 30, 2011. The song samples "Paulette" as performed by Balla et ses Balladins, the original music being "Boma l'heure" from the Congolese artists TP OK Jazz. "Mr. Nice Watch", which features Jay-Z, was solicited to urban radio as the album's third single on October 4, 2011. On October 24, 2011, J. Cole confirmed that the album's fourth single would be "Nobody's Perfect", which features Missy Elliott. It officially impacted Urban radio on February 7, 2012.

At a listening session in New York City, J. Cole previewed the album to a select few, including Insanul Ahmed of Complex. At the listening session it was revealed the song "In the Morning" featuring Drake off his Friday Night Lights mixtape would appear on the album. Cole defended this decision saying, he felt the song never got the push it deserved, and he wanted it to reach more people. Another song that was previously released on another project The Warm Up, was "Lights Please". Cole explained this song was the track that won over his manager Mark Pitt and Jay-Z. The interlude, was revealed to be a quick skit where Cole talks about the day he found out Jay-Z wanted to sign him. As soon as Cole got the good news he was pulled over and ended up spending the night in jail for parking violations. Even so, he explains that it was "the easiest time ever" because he knew success was coming around the corner. The track "Rise and Shine" opens with a sample from the documentary, Backstage where Jay-Z is talking about finding that one great artist that he will sign. "Dollar and a Dream III" was revealed, produced by Capsvl of 'The University' production team, the third in the "Dollar and a Dream series" following the two from his first two mixtapes. In an interview with VIBE Cole admitted that he originally wanted Jay-Z to appear on the song "God's Gift" rather than "Mr. Nice Watch". He continued saying, "Everything worked out, I'm a true believer that everything happens for a reason. Like, when he did that, it made way more sense than my song. It's a bigger record, a more universal record. Being the hip-hop nerd that I am, I would have loved to hear Jay-Z on that ["God's Gift"] beat. But really, I'm fine on that song alone." J. Cole released "Mr. Nice Watch" himself through the internet, for promotional purposes, on September 14, 2011. The song contains elements of Dubstep and Electronica. Two days before the album's release, J. Cole released a music video for the bonus track, "Daddy's Little Girl". On October 25, J. Cole released a three-year-old never-before seen music video for the track, "Lost Ones".

== Critical reception ==
Professional ratings
Aggregate scores
| Source | Rating |
|---|---|
| Metacritic | 75/100 |
Review scores
| Source | Rating |
| AllMusic | 4.5/5 stars |
| Entertainment Weekly | B+ |
| Los Angeles Times | 2.5/4 stars |
| MSN Music (Expert Witness) | B+ |
| Now | 4/5 |
| Pitchfork | 6.1/10 |
| Rolling Stone | 3.5/5 stars |
| Slant Magazine | 3/5 stars |
| Spin | 8/10 |
| XXL | 4/5 |

Cole World: The Sideline Story received generally positive reviews from music critics. At Metacritic, which assigns a weighted mean rating out of 100 to reviews from mainstream critics, the album received an average score of 75, based on 20 reviews, which indicates "generally favorable reviews". Brad Wete of Entertainment Weekly praised the album and wrote that it "is a well-rounded effort, and deeper than most..." Mikael Wood of Los Angeles Times gave the album a mixed review, commenting that "J. Cole's early-onset veteran status also saps some of the energy you'd hope to hear on a debut.," but also commended J. Cole on the "satisfying confidence with which J. Cole delivers his rhymes." David Jeffries of AllMusic stated, "Take a couple listens, let it sink in, and then discover that Cole World is one hell of a debut." Rolling Stone's Jody Rosen commented that the album "Cole is brainier than most mainstream MCs but too flashy for the underground" adding that "the melodrama feels rote; the rhymes hit the mark but the stories leave you cold." Matthew Cole of Slant Magazine complimented the album, saying that "the only thing Cole World really wants for is the kind of out-of-the-park highlight that would pull the whole album together." Adam Fleishcer of XXL mentioned Cole's high expectations, stating that "But it's these same factors that have positioned J. Cole's major label debut, Cole World: The Sideline Story, in an uphill battle against expectations.," and praising J. Cole, stating "Cole's DIY methods—producing the bulk of the album, enlisting limited guests—are admirable if, at times, restrictive." Kazeem Famuyide of The Source gave the album a positive review, stating that "All in all, Cole World: The Sideline Story has more bright spots than lowlights and serves as a solid debut."

=== Accolades ===
At the end of 2011, Cole World: The Sideline Story appeared on a number of critics' lists ranking the year's top albums. The Boombox ranked it number six, Complex number 10, Genius number 13, and Spin number 28. AllMusic and HipHopDX also included the album in their best of 2011 lists'.

== Commercial performance ==
Cole World: The Sideline Story debuted at number one on the US Billboard 200 chart, with 218,000 copies in its first-week of sales. As of December 2016, the album has sold 855,000 copies according to Nielsen SoundScan. On February 9, 2016, the album was certified platinum by the Recording Industry Association of America (RIAA) for combined sales and album-equivalent units of over a million units in the United States.

== In other media ==
The track "Rise and Shine" appeared on the 2015 video game NBA 2K16.

== Track listing ==
Credits adapted from BMI's Repertoire.

| No. | Title | Writer(s) | Producer(s) | Length |
|---|---|---|---|---|
| 1. | "Intro" | Jermaine Cole | J. Cole | 1:22 |
| 2. | "Dollar and a Dream III" | Cole; Canei Finch; Ronald Gilmore; Hustle Just; Jovan Woods | Capsvl (The University); Cole^{[a]}; Canei Finch^{[b]}; Ron Gilmore^{[b]} | 4:43 |
| 3. | "Can't Get Enough" (featuring Trey Songz) | Cole; Tremaine Neverson; Brian Kidd; Ibrahima Kouyate; Emile Soumah | Brian Kidd | 3:45 |
| 4. | "Lights Please" | Cole | Cole | 3:28 |
| 5. | "Interlude" | Cole | Cole | 1:39 |
| 6. | "Sideline Story" | Cole | Cole | 3:57 |
| 7. | "Mr. Nice Watch" (featuring Jay-Z) | Cole; Shawn Carter | Cole | 3:59 |
| 8. | "Cole World" | Cole | Cole | 3:04 |
| 9. | "In the Morning" (featuring Drake) | Cole; Aubrey Graham; Leslie Merceron; Xavier Smith | L&X Music | 3:54 |
| 10. | "Lost Ones" | Cole | Cole | 4:23 |
| 11. | "Nobody's Perfect" (featuring Missy Elliott) | Cole; Curtis Mayfield | Cole | 3:10 |
| 12. | "Never Told" | Cole; Ernest Wilson; Kevin Randolph; Steve Wyreman | No I.D. | 3:31 |
| 13. | "Rise and Shine" | Cole | Cole; Cubic Z | 4:34 |
| 14. | "God's Gift" | Cole; Milton Nascimento | Cole | 3:32 |
| 15. | "Breakdown" | Cole; Eero Koivistoinen | Cole | 4:50 |
| 16. | "Work Out" | Cole; Kanye West; Bosco Kante; Elliot Wolff; John Stephens; Miri Ben-Ari; Sukmeke Rainey | Cole | 3:54 |
| Total length: | | | | 57:43 |

iTunes Store bonus tracks
| No. | Title | Writer(s) | Producer(s) | Length |
|---|---|---|---|---|
| 17. | "Who Dat" | Cole; Anthony Parrino; André Benjamin; Antwan Patton; Patrick Brown; Clifford Robertson | Cole; Elite^{[a]} | 3:58 |
| 18. | "Daddy's Little Girl" | Cole | Cole | 3:03 |

Notes

- ^{^[a]} signifies a co-producer.
- ^{^[b]} signifies an additional producer.

Sample credits

- "Dollar and a Dream III" contains a sample of "Darkness of the Unknown" (from the Kingdom Hearts II OST), as composed by Yoko Shimomura.
- "Can't Get Enough" contains a sample of "Paulette", as performed by Balla et ses Balladins.
- "Lights Please" contains a sample of "Theme from the Planets", as composed by Dexter Wansel.
- "Sideline Story" contains an interpolation of "The World Is a Place", as performed by Rhythm.
- "Mr. Nice Watch" contains an interpolation of "A Million and One Questions / Rhyme No More", as performed by Jay-Z.
- "In the Morning" interpolates "Can I Get A", as performed by Jay-Z, and "Hold Ya Head", as performed by 2Pac.
- "Nobody's Perfect" contains an interpolation of "Think", as performed by Curtis Mayfield.
- "Rise and Shine" contains a sample of "Arise, Shine", as performed by Greg Dykes and the Synanon Choir.
- "God's Gift" contains a sample of "Francisco", as performed by Milton Nascimento, and "1st of Tha Month", as performed by Bone Thugs-n-Harmony.
- "Breakdown" contains a sample of "Bells", as performed by Eero Koivistoinen, and contains an interpolation of "Breakdown", as performed by Mariah Carey and Bone Thugs-n-Harmony.
- "Work Out" contains a sample of "The New Workout Plan", as performed by Kanye West, and "Straight Up", as performed by Paula Abdul.
- "Who Dat" contains a sample of "Godofallofus", as performed by New Hope, and "SpottieOttieDopalicious", as performed by OutKast.

== Personnel ==
Credits for Cole World: The Sideline Story adapted from AllMusic.

- J. Cole – executive producer, primary artist, producer
- Juro "Mez" Davis – engineer, mixing
- 1500 or Nothin Orchestra – instrumentation, strings
- Damien Alexander – A&R
- Chris Bautista – trumpet
- Carter Administration – executive producer
- Tom Coyne – mastering
- Anthony Cruz – assistant engineer
- Natalya Davis – marketing
- Larrance Davis – music direction
- Drake – featured artist
- Missy Elliott – featured artist
- Canei Finch – additional production, keyboards
- Jana Fleishman – publicity
- Kim Fox – vocals
- Julius Garcia – A&R
- Ron Gilmore – additional production, keyboards
- Alex Haldi – art direction, graphic design
- Ibriham Hammad – A&R
- Liz Hausle – marketing
- Jasmisha – vocals
- Jay-Z – featured artist
- Nate Jones – bass
- Brian Kidd – producer
- Rob Kinelski – engineer
- David Linaburg – guitar
- Andrew Lippman – trombone
- Leann Mueller – photography
- No I.D. — additional production, vocals
- Reginald Paul – tenor saxophone
- Chaka Pilgrim – marketing
- Mark Pitts – executive producer
- Kevin Randolph – keyboards, vocals
- Yolanda Renee – vocals
- Sharde Simpson – A&R
- Dante Thomas – alto saxophone
- Trey Songz – featured artist
- Jovan Woods – producer
- Steve Wyreman – guitar

== Charts ==
=== Weekly charts ===
| Chart (2011) | Peak position |
|---|---|
| Australian Albums (ARIA) | 52 |
| Canadian Albums (Billboard) | 4 |
| New Zealand Albums(Recorded Music NZ) | 36 |
| UK Albums (Official Charts) | 25 |
| US Billboard 200 | 1 |
| US Top R&B/Hip-Hop Albums (Billboard) | 1 |
| US Top Rap Albums (Billboard) | 1 |

=== Year-end charts ===
| Chart (2011) | Position |
|---|---|
| US Billboard 200 | 75 |
| US Top R&B/Hip-Hop Albums (Billboard) | 20 |

| Chart (2012) | Position |
|---|---|
| US Billboard 200 | 115 |
| US Top R&B/Hip-Hop Albums (Billboard) | 21 |

== Certifications ==
| Region | Certification | Certified units/sales |
|---|---|---|
| Denmark (IFPI Danmark) | Gold | 10,000^{‡} |
| United Kingdom (BPI) | Gold | 100,000^{‡} |
| United States (RIAA) | Platinum | 1,000,000^{‡} |
^{‡} Sales+streaming figures based on certification alone.
