= Music of Guinea =

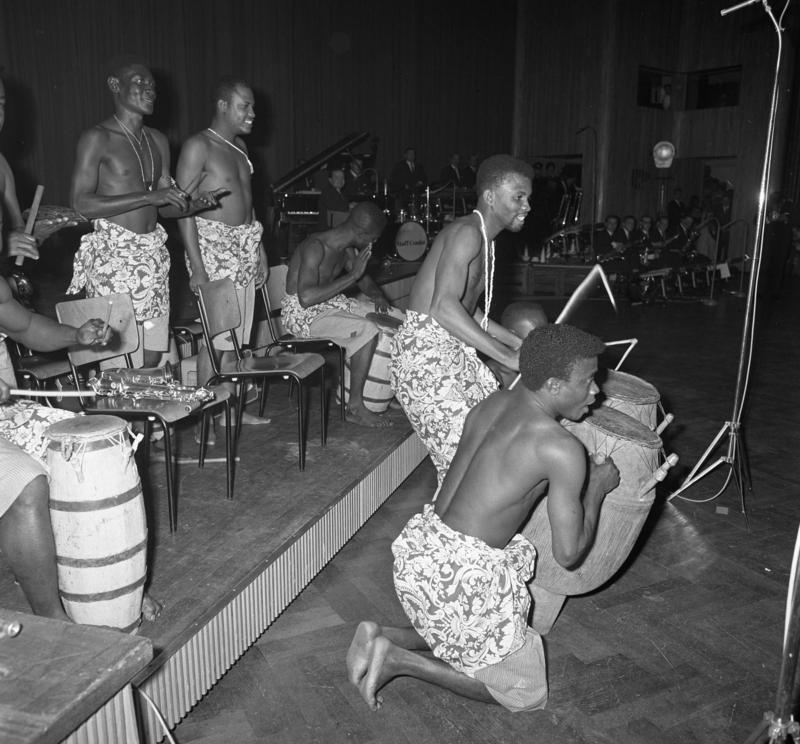
drummers of Guinea's national dance company

Guinea is a West African nation, composed of several ethnic groups. Among its most widely known musicians is Mory Kanté – 10 Cola Nuts saw major mainstream success in both Guinea and Mali while "Yé ké yé ké", a single from Akwaba Beach, was a European success in 1988.

== National music ==
French is the official language of Guinea and is the main language of communication in schools, government administration, the media, and the country's security forces. Independence for Guinea came in 1958. Guinea's President, Sekou Toure, disbanded all private dance orchestras and created a network of state-sponsored groups. The government soon formed the Syli Orchestre National, a dance orchestra that featured some of the best musicians in the land.

"Liberté" (Liberty) has been the national anthem of Guinea since independence in 1958. It was arranged by Fodéba Keïta, based on the melody "Alfa yaya".

== Traditional music ==
Guinea's 15 million people belong to at least twenty-four ethnic groups. The most prominent are the Fula (40%), the Mandinka (30%) and the Susu (20%). Fula is widely used in the central Fouta Djallon, Maninka in the east and Susu in the northwestern coastal region. It is a predominantly Islamic country, with Muslims representing about 85 percent of the population. Christians, mostly Roman Catholic, about 10 percent of the population, are mainly found in the southern region of Guinée forestière.

Mandé music is dominated by the djelis, travelling singer-historians who sing praises to noble patrons. Traditionally, popular instruments include the ngoni, a distant relative of the banjo, and the balafon. Famous balafon players include El Hadj Djeli Sory Kouyaté and, early in his career, superstar Mory Kanté. The kora, a cross between a harp and a lute, is also widespread. Other popular folk music utilizes the cylindrical dunun paired with the goblet shaped djembe.

As in Mali, a roots revival occurred in the 1960s and 1970s with state support from Sekou Touré. He introduced a radical cultural policy called authenticite, whereby musicians and artists were instructed to "look at the past" for inspiration and to incorporate traditional practices in their arts. Authenticite ended with the death of Sekou Toure in 1984.

== Popular music ==
After World War 2, the guitar was imported to Guinea and players like Kanté Facelli and his cousin Kanté Manfila developed their own style of playing. In modern times, the guitar plays a very important role.

Some of the early dance bands included popular groups like Keletigui Et Ses Tambourinis, Balla et ses Balladins, and Kebendo Jazz (also known as Orchestre de Danse de Guéckédou). Many of these bands recorded on Syliphone records. Bembeya Jazz National further enriched Guinea's musical melting pot after visiting Cuba in 1965.

== See also ==
- Guinean hip hop
- Master Drummer
- Kora
- Balafon
- Djembe
- Mory Kanté
