= In the Morning (J. Cole song) =

Song by J. Cole featuring Drake

from the album Friday Night Lights and Cole World: The Sideline Story
- Released: November 12, 2010
- Recorded: 2007–2010
- Genre: Hip hop
- Length: 3:54
- Label: Roc Nation; Columbia
- Songwriters: Jermaine Cole; Aubrey Graham; Leslie Merceron; Xavier Smith
- Producers: L&X Music

Music video
- "In the Morning" on YouTube

"In the Morning" is a song by American rapper J. Cole, originally released on his third mixtape Friday Night Lights (2010) and included on his debut studio album Cole World: The Sideline Story (2011). The song, produced by L&X Music, features Canadian hip hop recording artist Drake.

== Background ==
J. Cole initially recorded the song in 2007, before his record deal. He released it on his mixtape sampler, "The Warm Up to the Warm Up", released prior to "The Warm Up". Cole met Drake in Los Angeles, through record producer Chase N. Cashe. During what he called "the No I.D. sessions, my first time working on the album, like two years ago." He recalled: "Two years later I got a message from Drake like, ‘Yo, man. I just heard ‘In the Morning.’ That shit is retarded.’ I told him I was thinking about redoing it and he said, ‘If you ever redo it, save me a spot.’ Fast forward to Friday Night Lights, I saved him a spot, and he did it."

At a listening session in New York City, J. Cole previewed his debut album to a select few, including Insanul Ahmed of Complex. At the listening session it was revealed the song "In the Morning" featuring Drake off his Friday Night Lights mixtape would appear on the album. Cole defended his decision saying, he felt the song never got the push it deserved, and he wanted it to reach more people.

== Music video ==
A music video for the song was released on February 15, 2011. The video shows J. Cole and Drake in Paris, France. As of January 2024 the video had over 30 million views.

== Chart performance ==
The song first charted on the Hot R&B/Hip-Hop Songs chart the week of March 12, 2011 at No. 97. It peaked at No. 57.

== Charts ==
Chart (2011)	Peak position
US Bubbling Under Hot 100 Singles (Billboard)	17
US Billboard Hot R&B/Hip-Hop Songs	57

== Certifications ==
Region	Certification	Certified units/sales
United States (RIAA)	Gold	500,000^{‡}
^{‡} Sales+streaming figures based on certification alone.
