= Lights Please =

Single by J. Cole

Single by J. Cole

from the album The Warm Up and Cole World: The Sideline Story
- Released: November 24, 2009
- Recorded: 2008
- Genre: Hip hop
- Length: 3:28 (Album version); 4:27 (Mixtape version)
- Label: Roc Nation; Columbia; ByStorm; Sony
- Songwriter: Jermaine Cole
- Producer: J. Cole

"Lights Please" is the debut single by American rapper J. Cole, released on June 15, 2009 from his second mixtape, The Warm Up. The song was later released as a single on November 24, 2009 and appeared on his debut studio album, Cole World: The Sideline Story (2011).

== Background ==
"Lights Please" was the first song that was heard by his manager Mark Pitts, who later played it for Jay-Z. Pitts said in a 2011 interview, "I went to Jay's house and said, 'I'm going to play you one thing,' and I played him "Lights Please." Prior to Jay-Z reaction to the song, he called Cole and set up a meeting the next morning. The meeting led to Cole signing with Roc Nation, an achievement Cole had been striving for since attending college.

Although the song appeared on The Warm Up, Cole initially planned for it to be on his debut album. "I was performing the song in front of most of these people [who] didn't really know me they might have heard [of me]. I was like, 'I'm about to do this song. I wanna do something for y'all it's called "Lights Please." Even if I drop my album in 2012 this gonna be on the album." I said that not really knowing that my album would really almost drop in 2012. I said it just as a joke, but I was serious." Cole also said in interview, "when history is told 10, 15 years from now, 20, 30, 40 years from now, it's important that they know that song was a big part of my career. I wanted to do that song justice, it deserved more than [a mixtape track]."

== Recording and composition ==
The song is produced by J. Cole and samples Dexter Wansel's "Theme From the Planets". It was recorded in 2008 and Cole has expressed how he wanted it to appear on his debut album saying, "I had a show over 2 years ago [...] and I told the crowd, 'this is still gonna be on my album.' I always felt like that because it really represents my style." Cole considers the song as a personal classic of his, saying, "'Lights Please' is a J. Cole classic. Meaning that all my fans or true fans that's really been there for a minute are gonna recognize that song because it was on a mixtape I got called The Warm Up." The song is a story about a hook-up, in which Cole interrupts a conversation with a woman to discuss the state of the world: "I told her all about how we been livin' a lie / And that they love to see us all go to prison or die."

== Music video ==
On June 16, 2014, J. Cole premiered the music video for the song on MTV for the five year anniversary of The Warm Up. The video was shot in August of 2008, the same day he shot the music videos for "Simba" and "Lost Ones". However, Cole ended up not being completely satisfied with the way the final product turned out.

== Chart performance ==
Chart (2009)	Peak position
US Hot R&B/Hip-Hop Songs (Billboard)	9
