= Aboubacar Demba Camara =

Aboubacar Demba Camara (1944 – 5 April 1973) was a Guinean singer and songwriter. He led the band Bembeya Jazz National from 1963 until his death.

== Biography ==
Aboubacar Demba Camara was born in 1944 in Conakry, French Guinea to a family from Saraya, a station of Kouroussa. He attended the Coléa primary school until 1952, when he transferred to a school in Kankan. In 1957 he returned to Conakry to finish his primary studies before going back to Kankan where he enrolled in a vocational school and earned his certification as a cabinetmaker. In 1963 he moved to the town of Beyla in southern Guinea to work.

Demba Camara joined the band Bembeya Jazz National in 1963. He became its leader, lead vocalist, and primary songwriter. At the height of his popularity, Demba Camara was declared the top African singer by the British Broadcasting Corporation.

=== Death and burial ===
In March 1973 Bembeya Jazz National was sent to Senegal by the Guinean government for a performance tour. The band was warmly received at Dakar-Yoff Airport on 31 March, where they departed in a caravan for Dakar proper. At an intersection in front of the Deux Mamelles, the Peugeot 504 car carrying Demba Camara, guitarist Sékou Diabaté, and secondary vocalist Salifou Kaba was involved in a collision. Demba Camara was crushed under a door and was taken along with the other two to Dentec Hospital, where doctors determined that he had suffered a fractured skull, compressed rib cage, and several lacerations. In spite of the doctors' efforts, he died from internal bleeding at 01:00 on 5 April.

Upon the announcement of Demba Camara's death, a delegation of the Guinean government and central committee of the Parti Démocratique de Guinée assembled under Minister of Education Mamadi Keïta to retrieve his body. It landed at Dakar-Yoff Airport at 16:20, where it was met with a large crowd of mourners and a Senegalese Government delegation led by President of the National Assembly Amadou Cissé Dia. Cissé Dia declared that the Senegalese Government had spared no expense in its attempts to save Demba Camara. At 19:00 the Guineans landed in Conakry and Demba Camara's body was brought to the Palais du Peuple via truck where it was received by thousands of mourners. President Ahmed Sékou Touré and his wife bowed before the coffin. Demba Camara was given a state funeral which was attended by members of the Guinean and Senegalese governments. One hundred thousand people dressed in white followed his body to the Camayenne cemetery in procession, led by the Camp Boiro military band as it performed Boloba, a Manding song traditionally played in honor of warriors.
