= Nobody's Perfect (J. Cole song) =

Single by J. Cole featuring Missy Elliott

from the album Cole World: The Sideline Story
- Released: February 7, 2012
- Recorded: 2011
- Genre: Hip hop; R&B
- Length: 3:10
- Label: Roc Nation; Columbia
- Songwriters: Jermaine Lamarr Cole; Curtis Mayfield
- Producer: J. Cole

J. Cole singles chronology
"Party" (2011)	"Nobody's Perfect" (2012)	"This Time" (2012)

Missy Elliott singles chronology
"Last Friday Night (T.G.I.F.)" (remix) (2011)	"Nobody's Perfect" (2012)	"How Ya Doin'?" (2013)

Music video
- "Nobody's Perfect" on YouTube

"Nobody's Perfect" is a song by American rapper J. Cole, released as the fifth and final single from his debut studio album Cole World: The Sideline Story. The song, featuring fellow rapper Missy Elliott, was produced by Cole himself and interpolates "Think" as performed by Curtis Mayfield. The song was serviced to urban radio on February 7, 2012, through Roc Nation and Columbia.

== Background ==
On October 24, 2011, J. Cole confirmed his next single would be "Nobody's Perfect" featuring Missy Elliott. Prior to its official radio and digital release, the song debuted on the Billboard Hot R&B/Hip-Hop Songs chart at number eighty-seven. The song officially impacted urban radio on February 7, 2012.

== Music video ==
The music video was filmed in February 2012 by director Colin Tilley. It premiered on 106 & Park on March 14, 2012.

== Chart performance ==
The song first charted on the week of February 6, 2012, on the Hot R&B/Hip-Hop Songs chart at number eighty-seven. It has since peaked at number three. The song debuted on the Billboard Hot 100 on the week of May 28, 2012, entering the chart at number ninety.

== Charts ==
=== Weekly charts ===
Chart (2012)	Peak position
US Billboard Hot 100	61
US Hot R&B/Hip-Hop Songs (Billboard)	3
US Rap Songs (Billboard)	4

=== Year-end charts ===
Chart (2012)	Position
US Hot R&B/Hip-Hop Songs (Billboard)	12
US Rap Songs (Billboard)	16

== Certifications ==
Region	Certification	Certified units/sales
New Zealand (RMNZ)	Platinum	30,000^{‡}
United States (RIAA)	Gold	500,000^{‡}
^{‡} Sales+streaming figures based on certification alone.

== Radio add dates and release history ==
Region	Date	Format	Label
United States	February 7, 2012	Urban radio airplay	Roc Nation, Columbia Records
United States	April 30, 2012	Rhythmic radio airplay	Roc Nation, Columbia Records
