= Sur les traces du Bembeya Jazz =

- Directed by: Abdoulaye Diallo
- Produced by: Association SEMFILMS
- Cinematography: Gidéon Vink
- Edited by: Gidéon Vink
- Music by: Bembeya Jazz, Ségou Bembeya Diabaté, Ali Farka Touré
- Release date: 2007
- Running time: 72 minutes
- Country: Burkina Faso

Sur les traces du Bembeya Jazz (In the Steps of Bembeya Jazz) is a 2007 documentary about the Guinean band Bembeya Jazz.

== Synopsis ==
In 1961, in a small village in the middle of the Guinean tropical forest, a music band is born. This band will become one of the biggest orchestras of modern Africa. It is Bembeya Jazz. This orchestra, symbolizing the Guinean revolution of Ahmed Sékou Touré, managed to rock the whole African continent with their music. Forty years later, we go back to its roots.

== Awards ==
- FESPACO 2007
