= Sekouba Bambino =

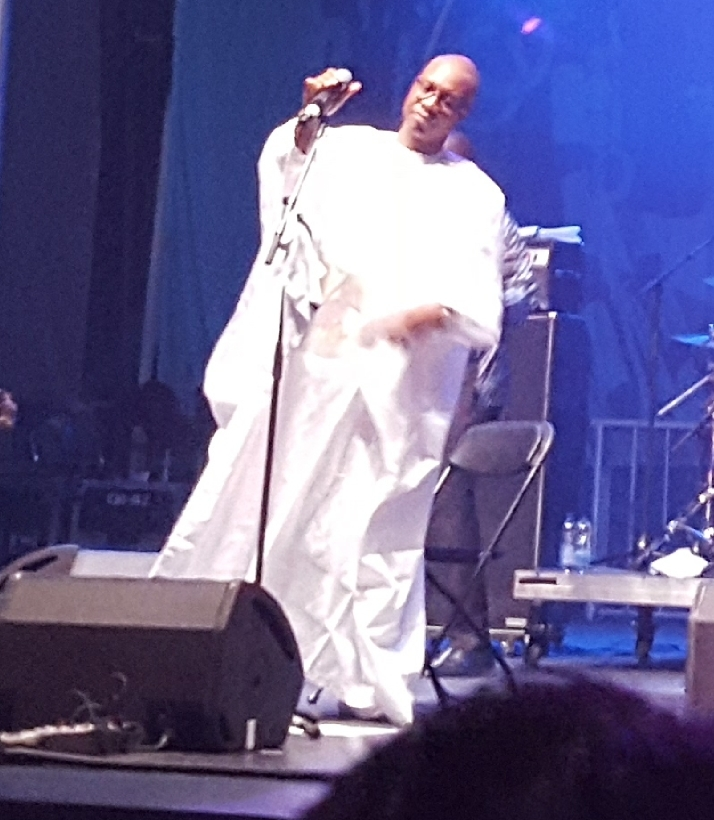

Background information
- Also known as: Bambino
- Born: Sekou Diabaté; 1964 (age 61–62); Kintinya, Guinea
- Origin: Mandingue
- Genres: Mandé Pop
- Occupations: Musician; songwriter; record producer
- Instruments: Vocalist; guitar
- Website: www.sekoubabambino.fr

Sekouba "Bambino" is the stage name of Sekouba Diabaté, a singer and musician born in Guinea, West Africa, in 1964.

Bambino was born and raised in the village of Kintinya, close to the border with Mali. He was born into a musical family, and is descended from a long line of griots, known in some Mande languages as jeli. His mother died when he was three years old, but left behind a legacy in the songs she had recorded which her son later heard on the radio. Her music became one of his main influences. Her death left Bambino with his father, who did not encourage his musical aspirations, hoping he would follow him working in his transport company, but from age eight, Bambino Diabaté sang with local bands and began to achieve musical renown. When he was 16, then-President Sékou Touré, (a music lover) who had heard him sing with local bands, insisted that he join Bembeya Jazz, Mali's best-known musical group.

Thus, in 1983, at the age of 19, Diabaté was asked to join Bembeya Jazz, Guinea's best-known musical group. He was given the nickname "Bambino" to distinguish him from one of the group's guitarists also named Sekou Diabaté (a.k.a. Sekou "Bembeya" a.k.a. "Diamond Fingers"). With Bembeya Jazz, the young vocalist undertook his first tour of Africa in 1985 and toured Europe the following year.

Sekouba Bambino released his first solo recording in 1991, and throughout the 1990s continued to record solo material as well as to sing with the African salsa group Africando. His 1994 album Syli nationale ("National Elephant"), was a homage to the Guinea national football team.

In November 2015 Bambino was caught up in an attack by suspected Ansar al-Din operatives on the Radisson Blu hotel in Mali's capital, Bamako, but was able to escape. The BBC quoted him telling journalists:

I woke up with the sounds of gunshots and for me, it was just small bandits who came in the hotel to claim something. After 20 or 30 minutes, I realized these are not just petty criminals.

== Discography ==
Album	Year
Sama	1990
Destin	1992
Syli National	1994
Kassa	1997
Sinikan	2002
Ambiance Ballon	2004
Ma Guinée	2011
Innovation	2012
