= The Way You Move (Ne-Yo song) =

Promotional single by Ne-Yo featuring Trey Songz and T-Pain
- Released: November 15, 2011
- Recorded: 2011
- Genre: R&B
- Length: 5:08
- Label: Def Jam
- Songwriter(s): Derek Clark; Michael Cole, Jr.; Emmanuel Frayer; Chris Fuller; Shaffer Smith; Tremaine Neverson; Faheem Najm
- Producer(s): 2fifty3

"The Way You Move" is a song by American recording artist Ne-Yo. The song features American singers Trey Songz and T-Pain. The official video for the song premiered on October 27, 2011, on Ne-Yo's official VEVO channel. The song was released to iTunes as a promotional single on November 15, it was originally recorded to be part of the track list of the album R.E.D. (Realizing Every Dream), but later the song was removed from the final track list in 2011.

== Chart performance ==
For the week ending November 19, 2011, "The Way You Move" debuted at number one on the South Korean International Singles Chart, selling over 119,000 digital downloads.

== Charts ==
Chart (2011)	Peak position
South Korea Gaon International Chart	1
US Bubbling Under Hot 100 Singles (Billboard)	10

== Certifications ==
Region	Certification	Certified units/sales
South Korea	—	172,382
