= The Warm Up =

Mixtape by J. Cole
- Released: June 15, 2009
- Recorded: 2007–2009
- Genres: Conscious hip hop; jazz rap
- Length: 69:46
- Labels: Roc Nation; Dreamville
- Producers: A-Plus; Elite; J. Cole; Kanye West; Ski Beatz; Syience; Butch

J. Cole chronology
The Come Up (2007)	The Warm Up (2009)	Friday Night Lights (2010)

Singles from The Warm Up
- 1. "Lights Please" Released: November 24, 2009

Professional ratings
Review scores
Source	Rating
Robert Christgau	(2-star Honorable Mention)
Complex	(favorable)
Rap Reviews	(8/10)
XXL	(favorable)

The Warm Up is the second official mixtape from American rapper J. Cole. It was released on June 15, 2009. J. Cole produced the majority of the mixtape with help from Elite and Syience. The mixtape has been viewed over 3,100,000 times, streamed over 451,000 times, and downloaded over 700,000 times on DatPiff. The mixtape went Double Platinum on DatPiff.

On November 22, 2024, the mixtape was re-released onto streaming platforms, accompanying the third episode release of Cole's audio podcast series Inevitable, which focused on this mixtape.

== Background ==
In November, the single "Lights Please" was released. It was met with great critical acclaim and caught the attention of rap mogul Jay-Z. In December 2008, J. Cole dropped the mixtape The Warm Up to The Warm Up, which included many songs that would make the final cut of The Warm Up such as “Grown Simba”, “Dollar and a Dream II”, "'Til Infinity" and the original version of “In The Morning” - a song that would later be remixed and included on Friday Night Lights. In January 2009, Cole released the promotional single "I Got It".

== Reception ==
J. Cole was famously signed to Roc Nation after Jay-Z heard the track "Lights Please" prior to the release of the mixtape. In August 2010, J. Cole was awarded the UMA Male Artist of the Year thanks to his heralded The Warm Up mixtape. He was awarded the first ever Sucker Free Summit Who's Got Next in 2010 because of the mixtape. On June 26, 2013, J. Cole announced that he would be re-releasing The Warm Up and Friday Night Lights for retail sale, in order to give them the push they deserved.

In his review for MSN Music, music critic Robert Christgau gave the mixtape a two-star honorable mention, indicating a "likable effort consumers attuned to its overriding aesthetic or individual vision may well enjoy." He cited "World Is Empty" and "Get Away" as highlights and quipped, "He's so talented you can hear how much he wants it, so talented you wince every time he shoots himself in the foot, e.g. 'Put some chains on my niggaz like I own slaves'".

== Track listing ==
All tracks are written by J. Cole.

No.	Title	Producer(s)	Length
1.	"Intro (The Warm Up)"	J. Cole	1:47
2.	"Welcome"	Cole	2:20
3.	"Can I Live"	Syience	3:21
4.	"Grown Simba"	Cole	3:52
5.	"Just To Get By"	Kanye West	1:37
6.	"Lights Please"	Cole	4:27
7.	"Dead Presidents II"	Ski Beatz	3:34
8.	"I Get Up"	Cole	4:54
9.	"World Is Empty"	Cole	2:55
10.	"Dreams" (featuring Brandon Hines)	Cole	4:25
11.	"Royal Flush"	Cole	1:27
12.	"Dollar and a Dream II"	Cole	4:21
13.	"Water Break (Interlude)"	Cole	2:19
14.	"Heartache"	Elite	3:01
15.	"Get Away"	Cole	3:17
16.	"Knock Knock"	West	1:54
17.	"Ladies" (featuring Lee Fields & The Expressions)	Cole	3:22
18.	"Til' Infinity"	A-Plus	2:11
19.	"The Badness" (featuring Omen)	Cole	2:37
20.	"Hold It Down"	Cole	4:17
21.	"Last Call"	West	7:32
22.	"Losing My Balance" (Bonus Track)	Cole	4:16
Total length:			1:09:46

Sample credits

- "Grown Simba" samples "Overture: A Partial History of Black Music" by Mervyn Warren
- "Just To Get By" samples "Get By" by Talib Kweli
- "Dead Presidents II" samples "Dead Presidents" by Jay-Z
- "World Is Empty" samples "My World Is Empty Without You" by Lee Fields & The Expressions
- "Dreams" samples "Wildflower" by Hank Crawford
- "Royal Flush" samples "Royal Flush" by Big Boi (which samples "Voyage to Atlantis" by The Isley Brothers)
- "Water Break" samples "I Shot Ya" by LL Cool J and "Warning" by The Notorious B.I.G.
- "Heartache" samples *"Born to Live with Heartache" by Mary Love
- "Get Away" samples "Cross My Heart" by Billy Stewart
- "Knock Knock" samples "Knock Knock" by Monica.
- "Ladies" samples "Ladies" by Lee Fields & The Expressions
- "Til' Infinity" samples "'93 'Til Infinity" by Souls of Mischief
- "The Badness" samples "Sunset Drive" by Husky Rescue
- "Last Call" samples "Last Call" by Kanye West
- "Losing My Balance" samples "Balance" by Sara Tavares

== Charts ==
Chart performance for The Warm Up
Chart (2024)	Peak position
US Billboard 200	159
