= Keletigui et ses Tambourinis =

Guinean dance music orchestra

- Orchestra
- Founded: 1959 onwards
- Location: Guinea Conakry

Keletigui et ses Tambourinis was a dance music orchestra founded in Conakry by the government of the newly independent state of Guinea. They were one of the most prominent national orchestras of the new country.

== Background ==
The newly independent state of Guinea, led by president Sekou Toure, established a number of music groups, competitions and festivals throughout the country to play the traditional music of Guinea rather than the European styles that were popular in the colonial period. The first orchestra to be founded was the Syli Orchestre National, its musicians drawn from the finest talents of the new nation. Later the government decided to split the orchestra into smaller units and Keletigui et ses Tambourinis, led by saxophone and keyboard player Keletigui Traoré, was one of these.

== Career ==
Like their rivals, Balla et ses Balladins, who were also descended from the Syli Orchestre National, Keletigui and his group were based in a nightclub in Conakry ("La Paillote") and made a number of recordings for the state-owned Syliphone record label.

The group was an organ of the state of Guinea and as such its working schedule, line-up and repertoire were strongly influenced by the officials of the state, as can be seen by the songs they recorded in praise of President Toure.

After the demise of Syliphone in 1984 the group continued to play. Keletigui Traore died in 2008 and was buried in a state ceremony. His orchestra are now led by Linke Conde and continue to play regularly at La Paillote.

== Discography ==
See http://www.radioafrica.com.au/Discographies/Keletigui.html for the group's complete discography, and http://www.radioafrica.com.au/Discographies/Syliphone.html and http://www.radioafrica.com.au/Discographies/Guinean.html for further information.

=== Compact discs ===
- Keletigui et ses Tambourinis. The Syliphone Years (2009) Sterns Music
- Authenticite - The Syliphone Years (2008) Sterns Music
