= Balla et ses Balladins =

Guinean dance-music orchesra

- Origin: Guinea Conakry
- Years active: 1959 onwards

Balla et ses Balladins (also known as Orchestre du Jardin de Guinée) was a dance-music orchestra formed in Conakry, Guinea, in 1962 following the break-up of the Syli Orchestre National, Guinea's first state-sponsored group. Also called the Orchestre du Jardin de Guinée, after the "bar dancing" music venue in Conakry that still exists today, the group made a number of recordings for the state-owned Syliphone label and become one of the first modern dance musical groups in Guinea to use traditional musical instruments and fuse together traditional Guinean folk music with more modern influences.

== Background ==
The newly independent state of Guinea established a number of music groups, competitions and festivals throughout the country to play the traditional musics of Guinea rather than the European styles that were popular in the colonial period. The government also set up the Syliphone label to record the ensuing music and thus preserve and enhance the culture of the new nation. Balla et ses Balladins were one of the most popular groups arising from these initiatives.

== Career ==
The group was named after their leader trumpet player Balla Onivogui, who was born in 1938 in Macenta, a small town in south-east Guinea, and was a student at a conservatory in Senegal before being recruited to play in the Guinea independence celebrations in 1959. He quickly became a member of the state's leading orchestra, the Syli Orchestre National, who were tasked with working with music groups throughout Guinea to train them to play the traditional musics of the country. In order to expand this programme the government split the orchestra into smaller units, one of which under the leadership of Balla became Balla et ses Balladins and held a residency at the Conakry nightspot Jardin de Guinée. (The other group emerging from the split was the equally renowned Keletigui Et Ses Tambourinis.)

Les Balladins made a number of recordings for the state-owned Syliphone label, which was founded in 1968. The group also toured abroad representing Guinea and some members worked as backing musicians for Miriam Makeba when she lived in Guinea in the 1970s. In 1970 Balla had a falling-out with some government officials and was briefly replaced as leader by his friend and trombone player Pivi Moriba, to be restored following the intervention of president Sékou Touré himself.

Guinea suffered a series of economic crises in the 1970s and in 1983 the national orchestras were all established as private concerns. In 1984, President Sékou Touré died, and the Syliphone label ended. Balla et ses Balladins continued to play during the Lansana Conte era, and when Balla Onivogui retired, in the late 1990s, his group recruited new musicians and still performs in Conakry.

Balla Onivogui died from a heart attack on 15 March 2011 in Conakry at the age of 75.

== Discography ==
=== Studio albums ===
- Objectif Perfection (1980)

=== Tracks on Syliphone compilations ===
- The Syliphone Years (2008), Stern's Music

=== Various artist compilations ===
- Authenticite - The Syliphone Years (2008), Stern's Music on http://www.sternsmusic.com
- The Rough Guide To Psychedelic Africa (2012), World Music Network
