= Roc Nation =

American entertainment company

Roc Nation LLC
- Type: Subsidiary
- Industry: Entertainment
- Founded: April 1, 2008; 18 years ago
- Founder: Jay-Z
- Headquarters: 540 West 26th Street; New York, NY 10001; U.S.
- Area served: Worldwide
- Key people: Jay-Z (chairman); Desiree Perez (CEO); Michael Yormark (president and CEO, Roc Nation Sports International); Jay Brown (vice chairman); Lenny Santiago (executive vice president, A&R)
- Owner: Jay-Z; Live Nation
- Divisions: Team Roc; Equity Latin; Roc Nation Unified; Roc Nation United; Roc Nation TV&Films; Roc Nation Sports; Roc Nation Sports International; Roc Nation Management; Roc Nation Records; Roc Nation Publishing; Paper Planes; Roc Lit 101; Three Six Zero Entertainment; S10 Entertainment & Media; Roc Nation Distribution; Arrive; ESM Productions; Édition; Roc Nation School of Music, Sports & Entertainment; Monogram; Roc Nation Rock; StarRoc; Made In America Festival
- Website: www.rocnation.com

Roc Nation LLC is an American entertainment company founded by Jay-Z in 2008. Headquartered in New York City, the company is a successor to his previous Roc-A-Fella Records label, with additional offices in Los Angeles and London. It serves as a record label, talent agency, media production firm, and clothing line, as well as educational and philanthropic programs.

It is co-owned by Jay-Z & Live Nation Entertainment.

== History ==
Roc Nation was founded in 2008 by Jay-Z with the intent of signing pop and hip-hop artists, succeeding his previous label, Roc-A-Fella Records. Unlike Roc-A-Fella, Jay-Z served as the company's sole proprietor. Roc Nation's first signed artist was rapper J. Cole.

In 2009, Roc Nation signed a distribution deal with Sony Music. After the Sony Music deal expired, in April 2013, Roc Nation signed a multi-year partnership with Universal Music Group.

=== Made in America festival ===
In September 2012, Roc Nation held the first Made in America festival in Philadelphia. Inaugural performances included artists across different genres, such as Jay-Z, Pearl Jam, Miike Snow, The Hives, Odd Future, and Passion Pit. Over the following years, artists such as Beyoncé, Kendrick Lamar, Imagine Dragons, Nine Inch Nails, The Weeknd, Rihanna, Coldplay, J. Cole, and Bad Bunny have also performed at the festival.

=== Roc Nation Sports ===
In 2013, A.G. Fahrenheit, an ally of Roc Nation and close relative of founder Jay-Z, helped launch Roc Nation Sports, a subsidiary dedicated to representing professional athletes. Shortly thereafter, Roc Nation Sports also launched a boxing promotion division.

In 2019, Roc Nation Sports launched its international division, Roc Nation International, with the opening of an office in London. The sports division later launched Roc Nation Sports Brazil in 2023. Other sports ventures have included collaborations with South African rugby club, The Sharks, AC Milan, United Rugby Championships, a marketing effort with Italian soccer agency, Serie A, Chelsea FC and active collaborations with SAILGP and the Mamelodi Sundowns.

=== Roc Nation Management ===
The company's management division, Roc Nation Management, and Three Six Zero Group announced the formation of Three Six Zero Entertainment, a management subsidiary that represents clients in film, television, and the literary arts in February 2015.

=== Roc Nation Latin ===
The company's previous Latin venture, Roc Nation Latin, was launched in 2016, with Romeo Santos named as chief executive officer. Santos signed Mozart La Para as the first artist to the label, along with other artists such as Victoria "La Mala," Yandel, and American Idol alum, Karen Rodriguez.

=== Paper Planes ===
In 2018, the company trademarked its streetwear clothing brand, Paper Planes.

=== Partnerships ===
Roc Nation and management company Philymack partnered in 2015. Philymack brought its current clients, such as the Jonas Brothers (as a group), Nick Jonas, Joe Jonas (and his group, DNCE), Kevin Jonas, and Demi Lovato, to Roc Nation.

Roc Nation partnered with event production companies ESM Productions and DPS (Diversified Production Services) in 2016. The partnership focused on large-scale productions such as concerts and live-streamed festivals. The same year, the company launched the Roc Nation Publishing Nashville division and partnered with Rhythm House, a Nashville multi-genre publishing company.

In July 2017, Roc Nation collaborated with MSFTSrep, an art collective featuring siblings Willow and Jaden Smith, and Harry Hudson. Within this partnership, all three artists were scheduled to release new music.

The following year, Roc Nation entered a partnership with S10 Entertainment, which included management and a record label. In 2023, the venture signed Puerto Rican rapper Myke Towers.

Roc Nation announced a long-term partnership with the National Football League in August 2019. The company became the live-music entertainment strategist for the league, producing all Super Bowl Halftime Shows since 2019. The collaboration augmented social justice efforts through the Inspire Change initiative. That December, Desiree Perez was named CEO of the company, succeeding Jay Brown, who was named vice-chairman. Perez formerly served as chief operating officer since 2009. As CEO, Perez assumed responsibility for the oversight of all 14 Roc Nation verticals.

In December 2020, it was announced that Roc Nation and Random House had teamed up to launch a new educational publishing imprint, Roc Lit 101. The partnership aimed to publish literature within the entertainment genre, focusing on topics such as music, sports, pop culture, activism, and art.

In 2021, Roc Nation teamed up with American Greetings to create custom greeting cards. Roc Nation also announced plans to launch a new brand and multimedia platform named EDITION in partnership with Modern Luxury Media. The brand would highlight pop culture influencers.

In 2022, the company announced a partnership with realty company SL Green and Caesars Entertainment to propose building a casino hotel in Times Square. The proposed development was rejected in September 2025.

In 2023, Roc Nation began a venture into the cannabis industry through a partnership with The Parent Company. The collaboration included the Monogram cannabis brand, allowing Roc Nation and The Parent Company to sell and distribute Monogram products.

In 2024, Roc Nation partnered with Versace in 2024 to produce "cause-focused initiatives" in an effort to support young emerging talent. The partnership included scholarships from Roc Nation School of Music, Sport and Entertainment for music and sports management students attending Long Island University.

In June 2025, it was announced that Roc Nation Sports International (RNSI) would be partnering with E1, the "electrified raceboat equivalent of F1," focusing on content creation to help E1 acquire new fans.

In September 2025, it was announced that RNSI would be partnering with Matchroom Boxing to help with promoting events to the U.S. market. This following the Matchroom: The Greatest Showmen documentary that premiered on Netflix.

== Notable artists ==
- Ambré
- Babyxsosa
- Belly
- Buju Banton
- Casanova
- Clipse
- Claye
- Dixson
- Dorothy
- Farina
- Flau'Jae
- Harloe
- Harry Hudson
- Infinity Song
- J. Cole
- J.P.
- Jay Electronica
- Jay-Z
- Jess Glynne
- Klein
- Kirby Lauryen
- Marvin Sapp
- Major Myjah
- Memphis Bleek
- Mozart La Para
- Nicole Bus
- Pusha T
- Rapsody
- Rihanna
- Snoh Aalegra
- Shmoney Juelz
- The Anxiety
- The Lox
- Westside Gunn

=== Management ===
- Alicia Keys
- Ayra Starr
- Benny The Butcher
- Bella Poarch
- Big Sean
- Bohnes
- Chon
- Christina Aguilera
- Clarissa Molina
- Claudia Leitte
- DJ Khaled
- Fabolous
- Fat Joe
- Fred Ball
- Hit-Boy
- Jackson Wang
- Jadakiss
- Jess Glynne
- Jozzy
- Kaash Paige
- Kamaiyah
- Kelly Rowland
- Key Wane
- Lil Uzi Vert
- Lola Ponce
- Maxo Kream
- Miguel
- Mustard
- Megan Thee Stallion
- Rapman
- Rihanna
- Rival Sons
- Robin Thicke
- Spiritbox
- Stargate
- The Lox
- The-Dream
- Touché Amoré
- We Came as Romans
- Westside Gunn
- Yo Gotti

=== Former artists ===
- Alexa Goddard
- Alexis Jordan
- Bridget Kelly
- Ceraadi
- Demi Lovato
- Freeway
- Gabi DeMartino
- Grimes
- Haim
- Inna
- Jaden
- Jarren Benton
- Jay Park
- Jim Jones
- K Koke
- Kalan.FrFr
- Kanye West
- Kyle Watson
- Kylie Minogue
- Mack Wilds
- M.I.A.
- Meek Mill
- Mariah Carey
- Mayaeni
- Nasty C
- Nick Jonas
- Q Da Fool
- Rita Ora
- ROMANS
- Romeo Santos
- Shakira
- Statik Selektah
- Sugababes
- Tainy
- T.I.
- Tinashe
- Tiwa Savage
- Vic Mensa
- Wale
- Willow
- Yellow Claw

== Publishing ==
- Jahlil Beats
- Lab Ox
- Lil Uzi Vert
- Ludwig Göransson
- Stress
- Symbolyc One
- Tiwa Savage

== Arrive ==
Roc Nation also operates an in-house venture capital arm called Arrive. By 2024, the company had reportedly made 44 investments in fintech, insurtech, edtech, health and wellness, social media, and gaming.

== Roc Nation Distribution ==
In 2018, Roc Nation launched an independent label named Equity Distribution. In 2019, Equity also acquired the rights to Jay-Z's 1996 debut Reasonable Doubt for release on digital and streaming platforms. In 2024, Equity Distribution and Roc Nation Records were merged to form Roc Nation Distribution. In 2025, Clipse released their first full-length album in 16 years, Let God Sort 'Em Out, under Roc Nation Distribution.

== Team Roc ==
In 2018, Roc Nation launched its philanthropic branch, Team Roc. The division focused on criminal justice reform.

== Roc Nation School ==
In August 2020, Roc Nation partnered with Long Island University in Brooklyn to begin a program called the Roc Nation School for Music, Sports, and Entertainment.".

== See also ==
- Roc Nation albums discography
- Roc Nation singles discography
